= Apostolic Nunciature to Florence =

Former diplomatic post of the Holy See

The Apostolic Nunciature to Florence was an ecclesiastical office of the Catholic Church to the Republic of Florence, Italy and later the Grand Duchy of Tuscany. It was a diplomatic post of the Holy See, whose representative was called the Apostolic Nuncio and had the rank of ambassador. In 1533, the Grand Duchy of Tuscany replaced the Republic of Florence. The office ceased to exist in 1860 after the United Provinces of Central Italy, a client state of the Kingdom of Sardinia-Piedmont, annexed Tuscany in 1859, and then Tuscany was formally annexed to Sardinia in 1860, following a landslide referendum, in which 95% of voters approved.

== Apostolic Nuncios ==
=== 16th century ===
- Giovanni Campeggi (2 August 1560 - January 1561)
- Giorgio Corner (13 January 1561 - 1565)
- Bernardino Brisegna (8 February 1565 - June 1573)
- Carlo Cicala (15 June 1573 - 25 February 1576)
- Alberto Bolognetti (25 February 1576 - September 1578)
- Fabio della Corgna (10 September 1578 - October 1579)
- Paolo Capranica (28 October 1579 - February 1581)
- Valerio della Corbara (13 February 1581 - April 1586)
- Giuseppe Donzelli (13 April 1586 - April 1587)
- Giovanni Mazza de' Canobbi (August 1587 - April 1589 deceased)
- Michele Priuli (10 April 1589 - 15 July 1591)
- Carlo Montigli (15 July 1591 - February 1592)
- Marino Zorzi (27 February 1592 - 15 October 1596 was appointed bishop of Brescia)
- Offredo de Offredi (26 October 1596 - 18 June 1598 appointed apostolic nuncio to Venice)
- Domenico Ginnasi (11 August 1598 - 1600)

=== 17th century ===
- Ascanio Giacovazzi (Giacobacci or Jacobacci or Jacovacci ) (5 May 1600 - 1605)
- Antonio Grimani (11 July 1605 - 27 June 1616)
- Pietro Valier (27 June 1616 - 1621)
- Innocenzo Massimo (12 March 1621 - 28 June 1622)
- Alfonso Giglioli (2 August 1622 - 24 March 1630 deceased)
- Giacinto Ferri (1630 - 1631) (Chargé d'Affaires)
- Giorgio Bolognetti (8 November 1631 - 26 March 1634)
- Giovanni Francesco Passionei (8 July 1634 -20 February 1641)
- Camillo Melzi (20 February 1641 - 12 July 1643)
- Breakdown of diplomatic relations
- Annibale Bentivoglio (20 April 1645 - 1652 dismissed)
- Antonio Pignatelli di Spinazzola (29 October 1652 - 21 May 1660) was appointed Apostolic Nuncio to Poland
- Stefano Brancaccio (9 June 1660 - 17 July 1666) was appointed Apostolic Nuncio to the Republic of Venice
- Lorenzo Trotti (5 November 1666 - 25 April 1668)
- Opisto Pallavicini (1 June 1668 - 29 November 1672) was appointed Apostolic Nuncio to Cologne
- Carlo Francesco Airoldi (5 November 1673 - 3 October 1675) was appointed Apostolic Nuncio to Venice
- Giuseppe Gaetani d'Aragona (4 April 1676 - 15 June 1678 dismissed)
- Ercole Visconti (15 November 1678 - 13 October 1680 dismissed)
- ...
- Giuseppe Archinto (22 April 1686 - 15 December 1689) was appointed Apostolic Nuncio to Venice
- Tommaso Bonaventura della Gherardesca (December 1697 - 19 April 1698 resigned) (internuncio)
- Tommaso Ruffo (19 April 1698 - 23 March 1700)

=== 18th century ===
- Niccolò Caracciolo (25 June 1700 - 23 April 1703) was appointed archbishop of Capua
- Antonio Francesco Sanvitale (17 August 1703 - 1 June 1706) was appointed assessor of the Congregation of the Roman and Universal Inquisition
- Nicola Gaetano Spinola (30 October 1706 - 6 September 1707) was appointed apostolic nuncio to Poland
- Girolamo Mattei Orsini (21 April 1708 - 11 October 1710 resigned)
- Girolamo Archinto (28 March 1711 - 1 December 1712, was appointed apostolic nuncio to Cologne
- Pier Luigi Carafa (20 July 1713 - 12 April 1717) was appointed secretary of the Congregation for the Propagation of the Faith
- Carlo Gaetano Stampa (29 April 1718 - 12 October 1720) was appointed apostolic nuncio to Venice)
- Lazzaro Pallavicini (5 March 1721 - 1 June 1731 resigned
- Fabrizio Serbelloni (1 September 1731 - 5 February 1734) was appointed apostolic nuncio to Cologne
- Giovanni Francesco Stoppani (13 April 1735 - 10 March 1739) was appointed apostolic nuncio to Venice
- Alberico Archinto (17 November 1739 - 1 March 1746) was appointed apostolic nuncio to Poland
- Antonio Biglia (22 July 1754 - 29 November 1755, deceased)
- Vitaliano Borromeo (16 March 1756 - 10 December 1759) was appointed Apostolic Nuncio to Austria
- Bernardino Honorati (24 April 1760 - 20 November 1766) was appointed Apostolic Nuncio to Venice
- Giovanni Archinto (20 December 1766 - 20 June 1769) was appointed Secretary of the Memorials
- Marcantonio Marcolini (23 August 1769 - 16 February 1771) was appointed Secretary of the Sacred Consulta
- Giovanni Ottavio Manciforte Sperelli (27 June 1771 - 1 December 1775) was appointed Prefect of the Apostolic Palace
- Carlo Crivelli (23 February 1775 - 14 February 1785) was appointed Prefect of the Vatican Secret Archives
- Luigi Ruffo-Scilla (26 April 1785 - 23 August 1793) was appointed Apostolic Nuncio to Austria
- Giovanni Filippo Gallarati Scotti (23 August 1793 - 18 August 1795) was appointed Apostolic Nuncio to Venice
- Antonio Maria Odescalchi (16 June 1795 - 1801) was appointed Master of the Chamber of His Holiness

=== 19th century ===
- Giuseppe Morozzo Della Rocca (11 May 1802 - 1806)
- Pietro Valentini (1 November 1806 - 6 May 1830 dismissed) (auditor)
- Costantino Patrizi Naro (December 1828 - 19 June 1829 dismissed)
- Giacomo Luigi Brignole (2 February 1830 - 10 February 1833) was appointed Treasurer of the Reverend Apostolic Chamber
- Girolamo Feliciangelo (21 March 1833 - 30 July 1836 dismissed) (appointed d'affaires)
- Loreto Santucci (August 1836 - May 1842 dismissed) (Chargé d'Affaires)
- Bernardo Tirabassi (May 1842 - 20 January 1845 appointed Bishop of Ferentino) (Chargé d'Affaires)
- Carlo Sacconi (January 1845 - 13 November 1847) was appointed Apostolic Internuncio in Bavaria (Chargé d'Affaires)
- Vincenzo Massoni (13 November 1847 - 16 June 1856) was appointed Apostolic Internuncio in Brazil (Chargé d'Affaires)
- Alessandro Franchi (16 June 1856 - 5 May 1859 dismissed)
- End of the Apostolic Nunciature
