= Apostolic Nunciature to Venice =

The Apostolic Nunciature to Venice was an ecclesiastical office of the Catholic Church to the Republic of Venice, Italy. It was a diplomatic post of the Holy See, whose representative is called the Apostolic Nuncio with the rank of an ambassador. The office ceased to exist when the Republic lost its independence after it was conquered by Napoleon Bonaparte on 12 May 1797 during the First Coalition.

== Apostolic Nuncios ==
=== 16th century ===
- Angelo Leonini (May 1500 - March 1505)
- Sede vacante
- Angelo Leonini (September 1509 - 1510)
- Michele Claudio (September 1510 - January 1512)
- Massimo Bruno (January 1512 - March 1513)
- Pietro Bibiena (March 1513 - February 1514)
- Bernardo Clesio (1514 - 1515)
- Sebastiano Maradini (1515 - April 1517)
- Latino Juvenale (April 1517 - September 1517)
- Altobello Averoldi (September 1517 - 1523)
- Tommaso Campeggi (1523 - 1525)
- Altobello Averoldi (1526 - 1528)
- Sede vacante
- Roberto Maggio (1532 - March 1533)
- Girolamo Aleandro (April 1533 - November 1534)
- Gian Matteo Giberti (November 1534 - ?)
- Girolamo Verallo (1537 - February 1540)
- Giorgio Andreassi (February 1540 - April 1542)
- Fabio Mignanelli (April 1542 - August 1544)
- Giovanni della Casa (August 1544 - 1550)
- Luigi Beccatelli (March 1550 - 1554)
- Filippo Archinto (1554 - 1556)
- Antonio Trivulzio (1556 - 1557)
- Carlo Carafa (1557)
- Sede vacante
- Pier Francesco Ferrero (1560 - May 1561)
- Ippolito Capilupi (May 1561 - June 1564)
- Guido Luca Ferrero (June 1564 - October 1565)
- Pietro Antonio Di Capua (October 15, 1565 - March 1566)
- Giovanni Antonio Facchinetti (May 6, 1566 - June 15, 1573)
- Giovanni Battista Castagna (June 15, 1573 - June 1577)
- Annibale di Capua (July 1, 1577 - September 1578)
- Alberto Bolognetti (September 10, 1578 - April 12, 1581)
- Lorenzo Campeggi (May 6, 1581 - June 1585)
- Cesare Costa (June 22, 1585 - December 1587)
- Girolamo Matteucci (December 1587 - January 1590)
- Marcello Acquaviva (January 8, 1590 - December 22, 1591)
- Alessandro Musotti (December 22, 1591 - 1593)
- Ludovico Taverna (February 26, 1593 - February 23, 1596)
- Antonio Maria Graziani (February 23, 1596 - October 8, 1598)

=== 17th century ===
- Offredo Offredi (October 8, 1598 - June 1, 1605 died)
- Orazio Mattei (July 21, 1605 - May 3, 1606 resigned)
- Berlinghiero Gessi (June 4, 1607 - November 14, 1618 resigned)
- Sigismondo Donati (November 14, 1618 - May 12, 1621 resigned)
- Laudivio Zacchia (May 12, 1621 - December 16, 1623 resigned)
- Giovanni Battista Agucchi (December 16, 1623 - January 1, 1632 died)
- Francesco Vitelli (July 25, 1632 - March 2, 1644 resigned)
- Angelo Cesi (March 2, 1645 - September 20, 1646 resigned)
- Scipione Pannocchieschi d'Elci (December 6, 1646 - October 3, 1652 resigned)
- Francesco Boccapaduli (August 24, 1652 - October 24, 1654 resigned)
- Carlo Carafa della Spina, C.R. (October 31, 1654 - August 13, 1658 appointed Apostolic Nuncio to Austria)
- Giacomo Altoviti (September 21, 1658 - April 22, 1666 dismissed)
- Stefano Brancaccio (July 8, 1666 - April 10, 1668 dismissed)
- Lorenzo Trotti (April 10, 1668 - April 1, 1671 dismissed)
- Pompeo Varese (February 13, 1671 - October 1, 1675 dismissed)
- Carlo Francesco Airoldi (November 29, 1675 - April 5, 1683 deceased)
- Giacomo Cantelmo (September 27, 1683 - April 18, 1685 appointed Apostolic Nuncio to Switzerland)
- Giuseppe Archinto (December 15, 1689 - January 13, 1696 appointed Apostolic Nuncio to Spain)

=== 18th century ===
- Agostino Cusani (April 26, 1696 - May 22, 1706 appointed Apostolic Nuncio to Spain)
  - Ottavio Gasparini (August 1 - December 1, 1706 dismissed) (internuncio)
- Giovanni Battista Anguisciola (November 10, 1706 - August 18, 1707 deceased)
  - Ottavio Gasparini (September 1, 1707 - November 1, 1710 dismissed) (internuncio) (for the second time)
- Girolamo Mattei Orsini (October 2, 1710 - September 22, 1713)
- Alessandro Aldobrandini (September 23, 1713 - July 1, 1720 appointed Apostolic Nuncio to Austria)
- Carlo Gaetano Stampa (September 23, 1720 - May 7, 1735 resigned)
- Giacomo Oddi (February 7, 1735 - February 25, 1739 appointed Apostolic Nuncio to Portugal)
- Giovanni Francesco Stoppani (February 27, 1739 - November 1, 1743 resigned)
- Martino Ignazio Caracciolo (December 30, 1743 - December 20, 1753 appointed Apostolic Nuncio to Spain)
- Antonio Branciforte Colonna (April 2, 1754 - January 29, 1760 resigned)
- Francesco Carafa della Spina di Traetto (January 29, 1760 - November 20, 1766 appointed Secretary of the Congregation of Bishops and Regulars)
- Bernardino Honorati (November 20, 1766 - September 30, 1775 appointed Secretary of the Congregation of Bishops and Regulars)
- Vincenzo Ranuzzi (September 18, 1775 - February 26 1782 appointed Apostolic Nuncio to Portugal)
- Giuseppe Firrao the Younger (April 8, 1782 - August 18, 1795 appointed Secretary of the Congregation of Bishops and Regulars)
- Giovanni Filippo Gallarati Scotti (August 18, 1795 - 1797 dismissed)
