= Cardinals created by Pius VI =

Catholic appointments from 1775 to 1795

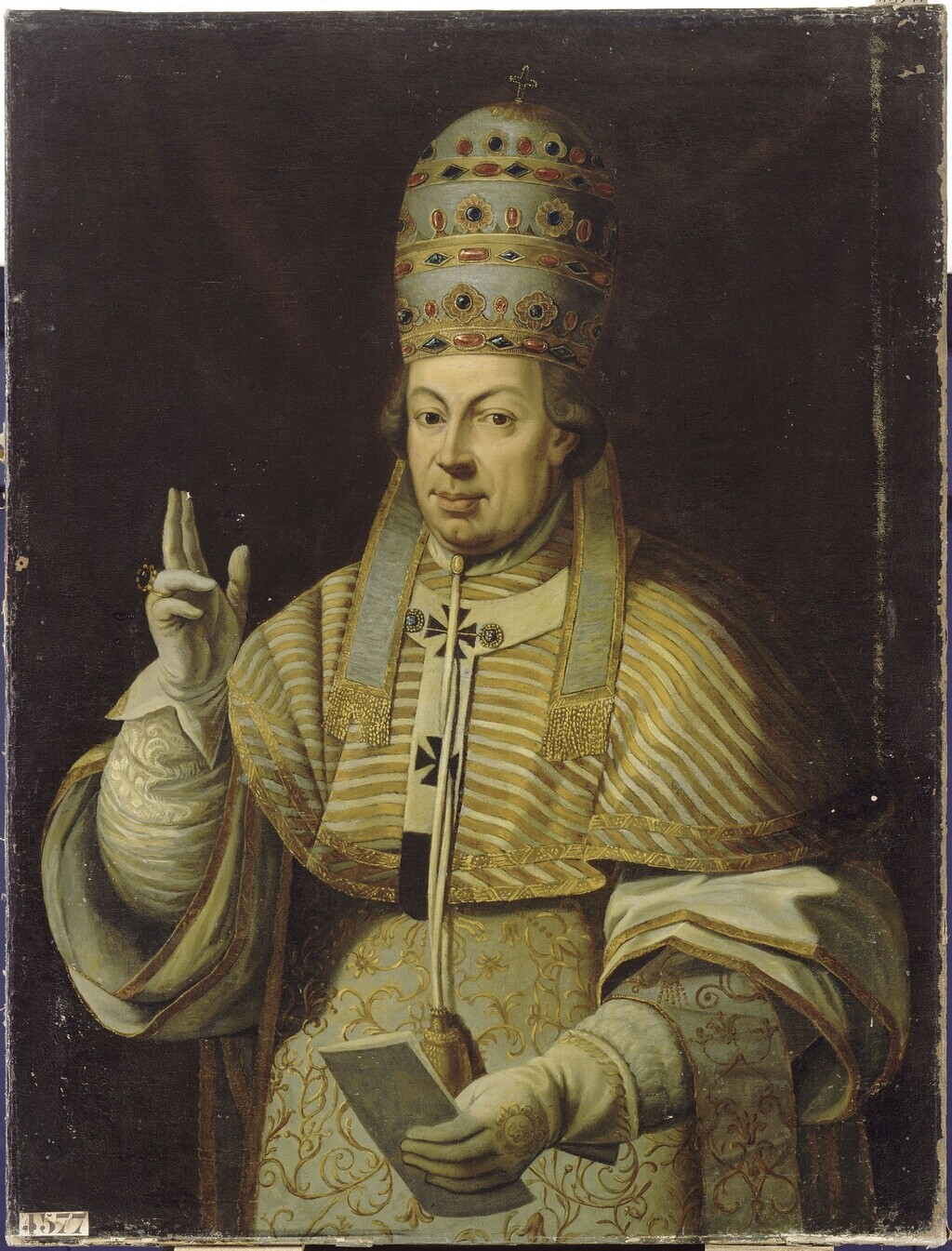
Pope Pius VI (1717-99).

Pope Pius VI (r. 1775–1799) created 73 cardinals in 23 consistories.

== 24 April 1775 ==
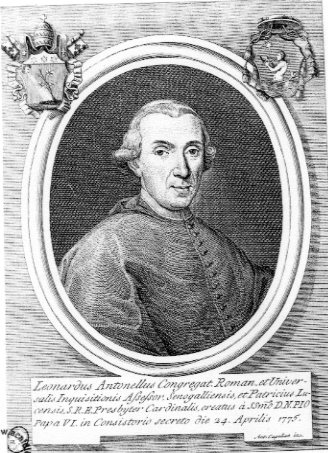
Leonardo Antonelli (1730-1811), made a cardinal on April 24, 1775.

1. Leonardo Antonelli
2. Bernardino de' Vecchi

== 29 May 1775 ==
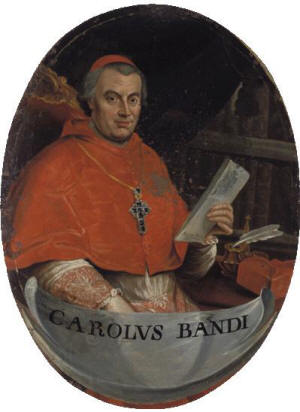
Giovanni Carlo Bandi (1709-84), made a cardinal on May 29, 1775.

1. Giovanni Carlo Bandi

== 17 July 1775 ==
1. Francesco Maria Banditi
2. Ignazio Boncompagni-Ludovisi

== 13 November 1775 ==
1. Juan Tomás de Boxadors

== 15 April 1776 ==
1. Luigi Valenti Gonzaga, in pectore
2. Giovanni Archinto

== 20 May 1776 ==
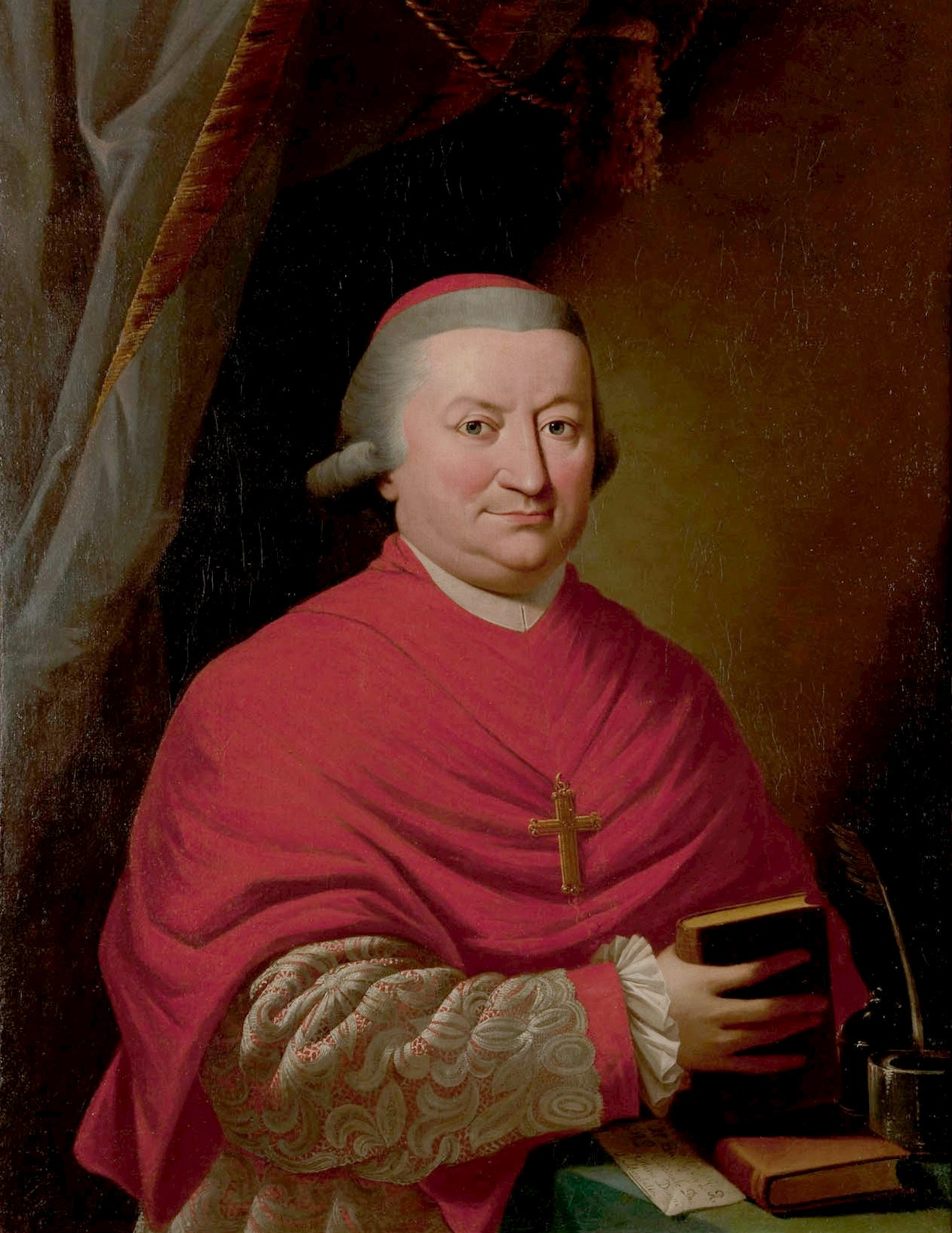
Angelo Maria Durini (1725-96), made a cardinal on May 20, 1776.

1. Guido Calcagnini
2. Angelo Maria Durini

== 23 June 1777 ==
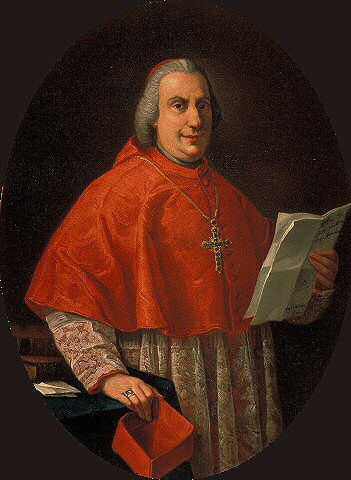
Marcantonio Marcolini (1721-82), made a cardinal on June 23, 1777.

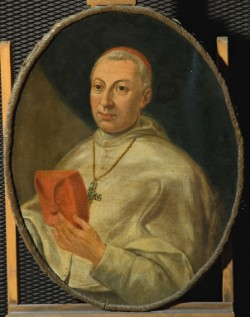
Andrea Gioannetti (1722-1800), made a cardinal on June 23, 1777.

Name	Title when named cardinal
1. Bernardino Honorati (b. 1724)	
2. Marcantonio Marcolini (b. 1721)	
3. Guglielmo Pallotta (b. 1727)	
4. Gregorio Salviati (b. 1722)	
5. Andrea Gioannetti (b. 1722)	
6. Hyacinthe Sigismond Gerdil (b. 1718)	
7. Giovanni Ottavio Manciforte Sperelli (b. 1730)	
8. Vincenzo Maria Altieri (b. 1724)	

== 1 June 1778 ==
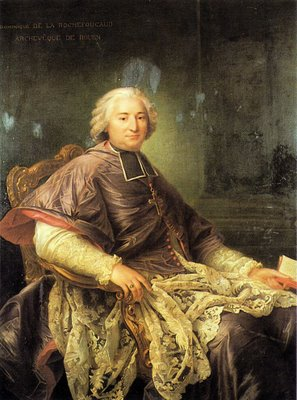
Dominique de La Rochefoucauld (1712-1800), made a cardinal on June 1, 1778.

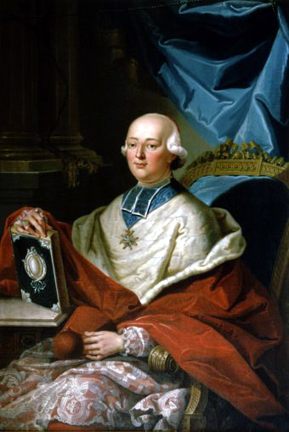
Louis René Édouard de Rohan (1734-1803), made a cardinal on June 1, 1778.

Name	Title when named cardinal
1. Francisco Javier Delgado y Venegas (b. 1714)	Archbishop of Seville, Spain
2. Dominique de La Rochefoucauld (b. 1712)	Archbishop of Rouen, France
3. Joannes-Henricus de Franckenberg (b. 1726)	Archbishop of Mechelen, Austrian Netherlands
4. József Batthyány (b. 1727)	Archbishop of Esztergom, Hungary
5. Tommaso Maria Ghilini (b. 1718)	Titular Archbishop of Rhodes, Greece
6. Carlo Giuseppe Filippa della Martiniana (b. 1724)	Bishop of Maurienne, France
7. Louis-René-Édouard de Rohan-Guéménée (b. 1734)	
8. Fernando de Sousa e Silva (b. 1712)	
9. Giovanni Cornaro (b. 1720)	
10. Romoaldo Guidi (b. 1722)	

== 12 July 1779 ==
1. Franziskus Herzan von Harras
2. Alessandro Mattei

== 11 December 1780 ==
1. Paolo Francesco Antamori

== 16 December 1782 ==
1. Giuseppe Maria Capece Zurlo
2. Raniero Finocchietti

== 20 September 1784 ==
1. Giovanni Andrea Archetti

== 14 February 1785 ==
1. Giuseppe Garampi
2. Giuseppe Doria Pamphili
3. Vincenzo Ranuzzi
4. Carlo Bellisomi
5. Nicola Colonna di Stigliano
6. Gregorio Barnaba Chiaramonti
7. Muzio Gallo
8. Giovanni de Gregorio
9. Giovanni Maria Riminaldi
10. Paolo Massei
11. Francesco Carrara
12. Ferdinando Spinelli
13. Antonio Maria Doria Pamphilj
14. Carlo Livizzani Forni

== 18 December 1786 ==
1. Romualdo Braschi-Onesti

== 27 January 1787 ==
1. Filippo Carandini

== 7 Apri 1788 ==
1. José Francisco Miguel António de Mendoça

== 15 December 1788 ==
1. Étienne Charles de Loménie de Brienne

== 30 March 1789 ==
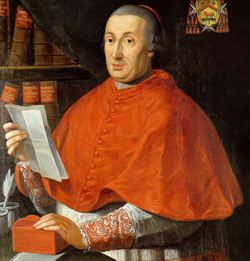
Stefano Borgia (1731-1804), made a cardinal on March 30, 1789.

1. Antonino de Sentmenat y Cartellá
2. Francisco Antonio de Lorenzana
3. Ignazio Busca
4. Vittorio Gaetano Costa d'Arignano
5. Louis-Joseph de Montmorency-Laval
6. Joseph Franz Auersperg
7. Stefano Borgia
8. Tommaso Antici
9. Filippo Campanelli

== 3 August 1789 ==
1. Ludovico Flangini Giovanelli

== 26 September 1791 ==
1. Fabrizio Ruffo

== 18 June 1792 ==
1. Giovanni Battista Caprara

== 21 February 1794 ==
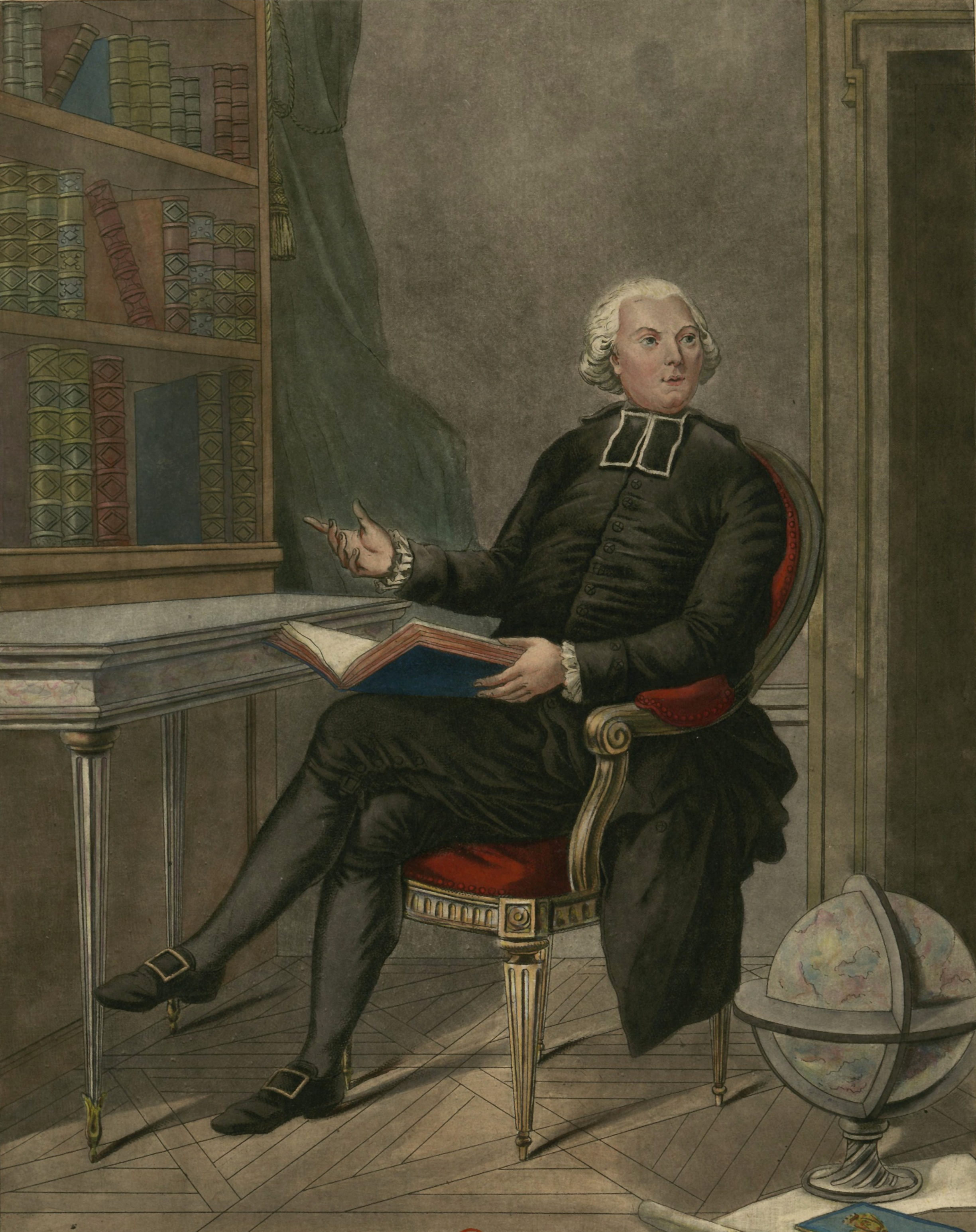
Jean-Sifrein Maury (1746-1817), made a cardinal on February 21, 1794.

1. Antonio Dugnani
2. Ippolito Antonio Vincenti Mareri
3. Jean-Sifrein Maury
4. Giovanni Battista Bussi de Pretis
5. Francesco Maria Pignatelli
6. Aurelio Roverella
7. Giovanni Rinuccini
8. Filippo Lancellotti

== 1 June 1795 ==
1. Giulio Maria della Somaglia
