= Franciscus Liberati =

Most Reverend Franciscus Liberati
- Titular archbishop of Ephesus
- Church: Catholic Church
- In office: 1688–1703
- Predecessor: Opizio Pallavicini
- Successor: Antonio Francesco Sanvitale

Orders
- Consecration: 25 April 1688 by Gasparo Carpegna

Personal details
- Born: 1615
- Died: 18 April 1703 (aged 87–88)

Franciscus Liberati (1615 – 18 April 1703) was a Roman Catholic prelate who served as titular archbishop of Ephesus (1688–1703).

== Biography ==
Franciscus Liberati was born in 1615. On 24 February 1688, he was appointed during the papacy of Pope Innocent XI as titular archbishop of Ephesus. On 25 April 1688, he was consecrated bishop by Gasparo Carpegna, cardinal-priest of San Silvestro in Capite, with Odoardo Cibo, Titular Archbishop of Seleucia in Isauria, and Ercole Visconti, titular archbishop of Ephesus, serving as co-consecrators. He remained as titular archbishop of Tamiathis until his death on 18 April 1703.

While bishop, he was the principal co-consecrator of Petrus Draghi Bartoli, titular patriarch of Alexandria (1690).

Catholic Church titles
Preceded by Opizio Pallavicini	Titular Archbishop of Ephesus; 1688–1703	Succeeded by Antonio Francesco Sanvitale
