= Theodosiopolis in Arcadia =

Ancient city and diocese in Arcadia Aegypti/Lower Egypt

Coordinates: 28.19°N 30.7°E

Theodosiopolis (in Arcadia) was an Ancient city and diocese in Lower Egypt,

The town was the seat of an ancient bishopric and is now a Latin Catholic titular see.

Its modern site is Taha Al-Amidah, (Governorate of Minya) in northern Egypt.

== History ==
Theodosiopolis was important enough in the Late Roman province of Arcadia Aegypti to be a suffragan of its capital Oxyrhynchus's Metropolitan Archbishopric, but the bishopric was to fade with the city.

== Titular see ==
The diocese was nominally restored as a Latin Catholic titular bishopric around 1600 under the name Theodosia, but was renamed Theodosiopolis in 1925, and finally to Theodosiopolis in Arcadia (avoiding confusion with namesakes) in 1933.

It is vacant since decades, having had the following incumbents, first of the lowest (episcopal) rank, but since 1669 of the archiepiscopal (intermediary) rank :

- Titular Bishop Andrzej Wilczyński (1608.10.13 – 1625?)
- Titular Bishop Andrzej Gembicki (1628.01.10 – 1638.04.19)
- Titular Bishop Jan Madaliński, Cistercians (O. Cist.) (1640.04.16 – ?)
- Titular Bishop Adrian Grodecki (1644.12.12 – ?)
- Titular Archbishop Archbishop-elect Domenico de’ Marini (1669.12.02 – ?)
- Titular Archbishop Francesco Marini (1686.04.27 – ?)
- Titular Archbishop Ulisse Giuseppe Gozzadini (1700.09.08 – 1709.04.15) (later Cardinal)
- Titular Archbishop Domenico Zauli (1709.05.06 – 1722.03.01)
- Titular Archbishop Prospero Lambertini (1724.06.12 – 1727.01.20) (later Pope Benedict XIV)
- Titular Archbishop Antonio Francesco Valenti (1727.01.20 – 1731.05.15)
- Titular Archbishop Joseph-Dominique d’Inguimbert, O. Cist. (1731.12.17 – 1735.05.11)
- Titular Archbishop Filippo Carlo Spada (1738.12.19 – 1742.01.22), previously Bishop of Pesaro (Italy) (1702.11.20 – 1738.12.19), later Titular Latin Patriarch of Alexandria (1742.01.22 – death 1742.12.08)
- Titular Archbishop Michele Maria Vincentini (1742.05.25 – 1754.07.06)
- Titular Archbishop Georgio Maria Lascaris (1754.06.22 – 1762.12.20), previously Titular Bishop of Zenopolis (1741.04.17 – 1754.06.22), later Titular Latin Patriarch of Jerusalem (1762.12.20 – 1795.12.11)
- Titular Archbishop Scipione Borghese (1765.07.05 – 1770.09.10) (later Cardinal)
- Titular Archbishop Giovanni Ottavio Manciforte Sperelli (1771.06.17 – 1780.12.11) (later Cardinal)
- Titular Archbishop Ferdinando Maria Saluzzo (1784.06.25 – 1784.07.13) (later Cardinal)
- Titular Archbishop Simon Aichner (1904.06.28 – 1910.11.01)
- Titular Archbishop Celso Benigno Luigi Costantini (剛恆毅) (1922.09.09 – 1953.01.12) (later Cardinal)
- Titular Archbishop Arrigo Pintonello (1953.11.04 – 1967.09.12)

== Source and external links ==
- GCatholic, with titular incumbent biography links

Specific
