= Ercole Visconti =

Catholic archbishop and Papal Nuncio

Most Reverend Ercole Visconti
- Titular Archbishop of Tamiathis
- Church: Catholic Church
- In office: 1678–1712
- Predecessor: Angelo Maria Ranuzzi
- Successor: Marco Antonio Ansidei
- Previous posts: Apostolic Nuncio to Florence (1678–1680); Apostolic Nuncio to Germany (1680–1687)

Orders
- Consecration: 31 July 1678 by Carlo Pio di Savoia

Personal details
- Born: 1646 Milan, Italy
- Died: 1712 (age 66)

Ercole Visconti (1646–1712) was a Roman Catholic prelate who served as Titular Archbishop of Tamiathis (1678–1712), Apostolic Nuncio to Germany (1680–1687), and Apostolic Nuncio to Florence (1678–1680).

== Biography ==
Ercole Visconti was born in Milan, Italy in 1646 and ordained a priest in the . On 18 July 1678, he was appointed during the papacy of Pope Innocent XI as Titular Archbishop of Tamiathis. On 31 July 1678, he was consecrated bishop by Carlo Pio di Savoia, Cardinal-Priest of San Crisogono, and Egidio Colonna, Titular Patriarch of Jerusalem, and Francesco Casati, Titular Archbishop of Trapezus, serving as co-consecrators. On 15 November 1678, he was appointed during the papacy of Pope Innocent XI as Apostolic Nuncio to Florence; he resigned on 13 October 1680. On 12 October 1680, he was appointed during the papacy of Pope Innocent XI as Apostolic Nuncio to Germany; he resigned in July 1687. He remained as Titular Archbishop of Tamiathis until his death in 1712.

== Episcopal succession ==
While bishop, he was the principal co-consecrator of:

- Wilhelm Egon von Fürstenberg, Bishop of Strasbourg (1683);

and the principal co-consecrator of:

- Franciscus Liberati, Titular Archbishop of Ephesus (1688);
- Petrus Draghi Bartoli, Titular Patriarch of Alexandria (1690); and
- Baldassare Cenci (seniore), Titular Archbishop of Larissa in Thessalia (1691).

== External links and additional sources ==
- Cheney, David M. "Nunciature to Florence (Tuscany)". Catholic-Hierarchy.org. (for Chronology of Bishops) ^{[self-published]}

Catholic Church titles
| Preceded by Gregorio Giuseppe Gaetani de Aragonia | Apostolic Nuncio to Florence; 1678–1680 | Succeeded by Giuseppe Archinto |
| Preceded by Opizio Pallavicini | Apostolic Nuncio to Germany; 1680–1687 | Succeeded by Sebastiano Antonio Tanara |
| Preceded by Angelo Maria Ranuzzi | Titular Archbishop of Tamiathis; 1678–1712 | Succeeded by Marco Antonio Ansidei |
