= Carlo Francesco Airoldi =

Italian Roman Catholic prelate

Most Reverend Carlo Francesco Airoldi
- Titular Archbishop of Edessa in Osrhoëne; Apostolic Nuncio to Venice
- Church: Catholic Church
- Predecessor: Johann Eberhard Nidhard
- Successor: Tommaso Vidoni
- Previous posts: Apostolic Internuncio to Belgium (1668–1673); Apostolic Nuncio to Florence (1673–1675)

Orders
- Consecration: 30 July 1673 by Gasparo Carpegna

Personal details
- Born: 1637 Milan, Italy
- Died: 5 April 1683 (age 46) Milan, Italy
- Coat of arms

Carlo Francesco Airoldi (1637–1683) was a Roman Catholic prelate who served as Titular Archbishop of Edessa in Osrhoëne (1673–1683), Apostolic Nuncio to Venice (1675–1683), Apostolic Nuncio to Florence (1673–1675), and Apostolic Internuncio to Belgium (1668–1673).

== Biography ==
Carlo Francesco Airoldi was born in Milan, Italy in 1637. On 16 November 1668, he was appointed during the papacy of Pope Clement IX as Apostolic Internuncio to Belgium; he resigned on 8 April 1673. On 26 June 1673, he was appointed during the papacy of Pope Clement X as Titular Archbishop of Edessa in Osrhoëne. On 30 July 1673, he was consecrated bishop by Gasparo Carpegna, Cardinal-Priest of San Silvestro in Capite, with Stefano Brancaccio, Bishop of Viterbo e Tuscania, and Giannotto Gualterio, Archbishop of Fermo, serving as co-consecrators at the church of San Bernardo alle Terme in Rome. On 5 November 1673, he was appointed during the papacy of Pope Clement X as Apostolic Nuncio to Florence; he resigned on 3 October 1675. On 29 November 1675, he was appointed during the papacy of Pope Clement X as Apostolic Nuncio to Venice. He served as Apostolic Nuncio to Venice and Titular Archbishop of Edessa in Osrhoëne until his death on 5 April 1683. He is buried in the cathedral in Milan.

== External links and additional sources ==
- Cheney, David M. "Nunciature to Florence (Tuscany)". Catholic-Hierarchy.org. (for Chronology of Bishops) ^{[self-published]}
- Cheney, David M. "Nunciature to Venice". Catholic-Hierarchy.org. (for Chronology of Bishops) ^{[self-published]}

Catholic Church titles
Preceded by Giacomo Rospigliosi	Apostolic Internuncio to Belgium; 1668–1673	Succeeded by Sebastiano Antonio Tanara
Preceded by Opizio Pallavicini	Apostolic Nuncio to Florence; 1673–1675	Succeeded by Gregorio Giuseppe Gaetani de Aragonia
Preceded by Pompeo Varese	Apostolic Nuncio to Venice; 1675–1683	Succeeded by Giuseppe Archinto
Preceded by Johann Eberhard Nidhard	Titular Archbishop of Edessa in Osrhoëne; 1673–1683	Succeeded by Tommaso Vidoni
