= Andrea Riggio =

18th-century Roman Catholic bishop

Most Reverend Andrea Riggio
- Titular Patriarch of Constantinople; Bishop of Catania
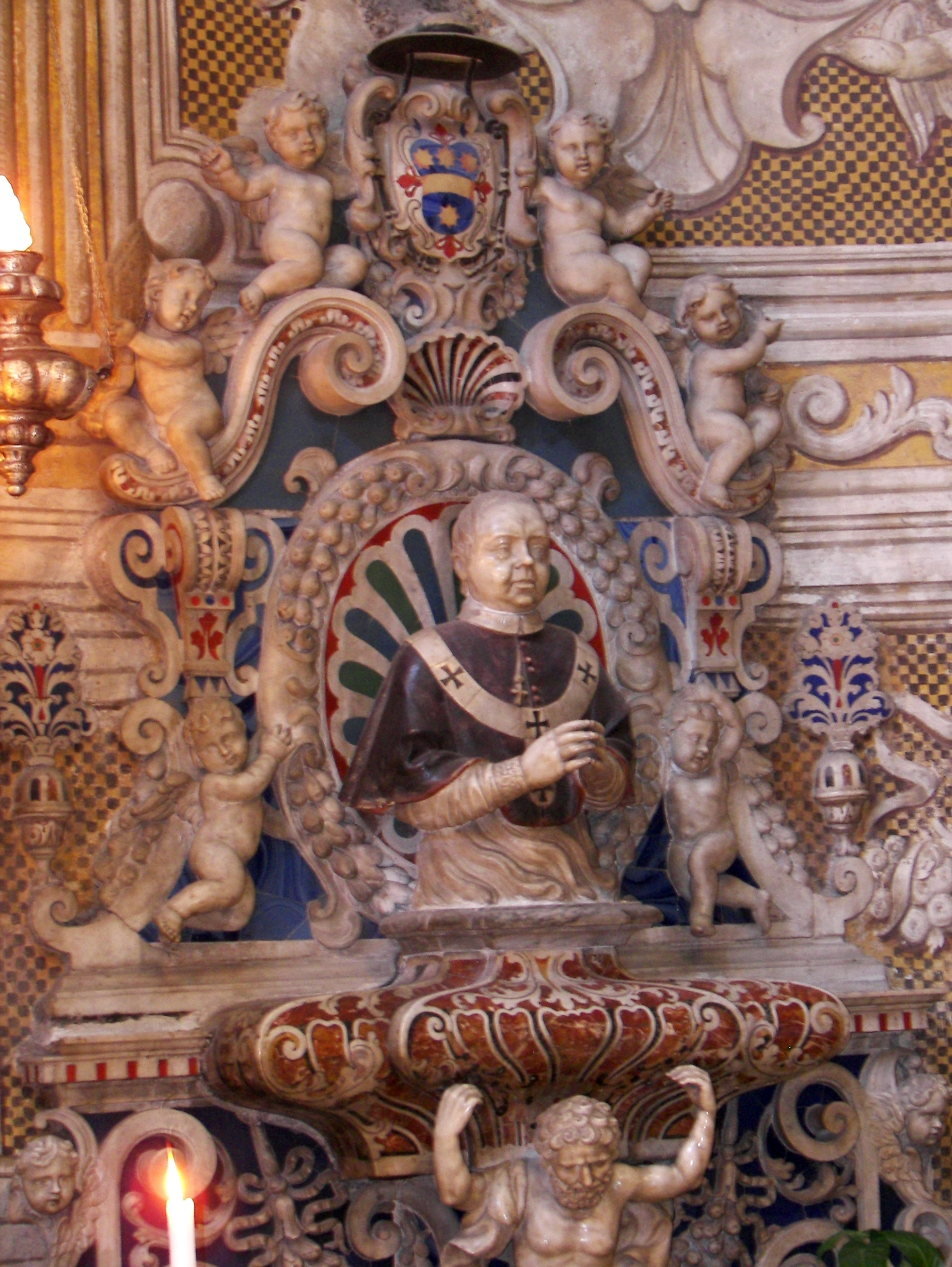
- Church: Catholic Church

Orders
- Ordination: 15 Jan 1685
- Consecration: 15 Mar 1693 by Gasparo Carpegna

Personal details
- Born: 10 Mar 1660 Palermo, Italy
- Died: 15 Dec 1717 (age 57)

Andrea Riggio or Reggio (1660–1717) was a Roman Catholic prelate who served as Titular Patriarch of Constantinople (1716–1717) and Bishop of Catania (1693–1717).

== Biography ==
Andrea Riggio was born on 10 Mar 1660 in Palermo and ordained a priest on 15 Jan 1685. On 9 Mar 1693, he was appointed during the papacy of Pope Innocent XII as Bishop of Catania. On 15 Mar 1693, he was consecrated bishop by Gasparo Carpegna, Cardinal-Priest of Santa Maria in Trastevere, with Petrus Draghi Bartoli, Titular Patriarch of Alexandria, and Michelangelo Mattei, Titular Archbishop of Hadrianopolis in Haemimonto with serving as co-consecrators. On 13 Jan 1716, he was appointed during the papacy of Pope Clement XI as Titular Patriarch of Constantinople. He served as Bishop of Catania until his death on 15 Dec 1717.

== External links and additional sources ==
- Cheney, David M. "Archdiocese of Catania". Catholic-Hierarchy.org. (for Chronology of Bishops) ^{[self-published]}
- Chow, Gabriel. "Metropolitan Archdiocese of Catania". GCatholic.org. (for Chronology of Bishops) ^{[self-published]}
- Cheney, David M. "Constantinople (Titular See)". Catholic-Hierarchy.org. (for Chronology of Bishops) ^{[self-published]}
- Chow, Gabriel. "Titular Patriarchal See of Constantinople (Turkey)". GCatholic.org. (for Chronology of Bishops) ^{[self-published]}

Catholic Church titles
Preceded by Francesco Antonio Carafa	Bishop of Catania; 1693–1717	Succeeded by Juan Álvaro Cienfuegos Villazón
Preceded by Lodovico Pico Della Mirandola	Titular Patriarch of Constantinople; 1716–1717	Succeeded by Camillo Cibo
