= Lorenzo Campeggi (bishop of Cervia) =

16th-century Catholic bishop

- Bishop of Cervia
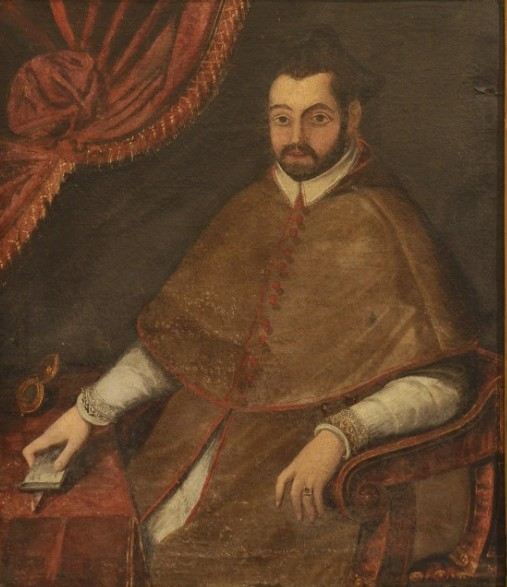
- Church: Catholic Church
- Diocese: Diocese of Cervia
- In office: 1582–1585
- Predecessor: Ottavio Santacroce
- Successor: Decio Azzolini (seniore)
- Previous posts: Apostolic Nuncio to Naples (1577–1580); Apostolic Nuncio to Venice (1581–1585)

Orders
- Consecration: 5 June 1582 (Bishop) by Giovanni Trevisan Patriarch of Venice

Personal details
- Born: 13 April 1547 Bologna, State of the Church
- Died: 6 November 1585 (aged 38) Ferrara, Duchy of Ferrara

Lorenzo Campeggi (1547–1585) was a Roman Catholic prelate who served as Bishop of Cervia (1582–1585), Apostolic Nuncio to Venice (1581–1585), and Apostolic Nuncio to Naples (1577–1580).

== Early life ==
Lorenzo Campeggi was born in Bologna on 13 April 1547, the son of Count Vincenzo. His family held considerable influence in the city, and his godfather at baptism was Cardinal Giovanni Maria Del Monte, the future Pope Julius III. Lorenzo pursued humanistic studies and, by the age of fifteen, had already mastered the art of Latin prose, as evidenced by a letter he composed for Paolo Manuzio. In 1563, he was appointed archdeacon of Bologna Cathedral. On May 14, 1571, he earned his doctorate in law, and in 1572, he began his teaching career.

The Bolognese Pope Gregory XIII summoned Lorenzo to Rome in 1573, where he embarked on his legal career. He was admitted to the College of Consistorial Advocates, and on 15 June 1574, he was appointed defensor pauperum (advocate for the poor). Additionally, Lorenzo Campeggi was named referendarius utriusque signaturae, granting him a prestigious role in the papal legal system.

== Nuncio and bishop ==
In May 1577, he was appointed during the papacy of Pope Gregory XIII as Apostolic Nuncio to Naples. The nunciature in Naples proved arduous. Upon his appointment, Lorenzo Campeggi immediately clashed with the government of King Philip II over the Nuncio’s prerogative to adjudicate, through his own tribunals, cases involving laypersons who failed to comply with the Holy See’s right of Jus spolii over the goods of deceased bishops. This dispute delayed the sovereign’s exequatur of his nomination until September of the same year. The remainder of Campeggi’s tenure as Nuncio in Naples was likewise marked by his determined efforts to safeguard and enhance papal revenues. In particular, he insisted that tithes be assessed based on actual income rather than established customary values, thereby increasing their yield by approximately thirty percent. The conflict with the Viceroy of Naples escalated, and on 5 January 1580, Lorenzo Campeggi resigned from his post, having achieved only minimal success in implementing his tithe reform.

In 1580, the Pope ordered an apostolic visitation to Venice to investigate reports of clerical abuses and, above all, to reaffirm the hierarchical structure of the Church. The task was entrusted to Bishop Alberto Bolognetti, who, despite being accompanied by two Venetian bishops, was ultimately unable to complete his visitation due to strong opposition from the government of the Republic of Venice. Therefore, on 6 May 1581, Pope Gregory XIII appointed Lorenzo Campeggi as Apostolic Nuncio to Venice with the order to complete the apostolic visitation. Campeggi successfully concluded the visitation in a short time, thanks primarily to an agreement reached with the Patriarch. Under this arrangement, the Nuncio would limit his inspections to male monasteries and a single parish, while the Patriarch himself would oversee the visitation of female monasteries, which were the primary area of concern.

On 8 January 1582, Lorenzo Campeggi was appointed Bishop of Cervia. He received episcopal consecration in Venice at the hands of the Patriarch, Giovanni Trevisan, on 5 June 1582. On 22 June 1585, he resigned as Nuncio to Venice and relocated to Massa Fiscaglia, the customary residence of the Bishops of Cervia. That September, he convened a diocesan synod to implement the decrees of the Council of Trent. However, his tenure was cut short: on 6 November 1585, during a visit to nearby Ferrara, he died. His remains were interred in the Church of Saints Bernardino and Martha in Bologna.

Catholic Church titles
Preceded by Antonmaria Sauli	Apostolic Nuncio to Naples; 1577–1580	Succeeded by Fantino Petrignani
Preceded by Alberto Bolognetti	Apostolic Nuncio to Venice; 1581–1585	Succeeded by Cesare Costa
Preceded by Ottavio Santacroce	Bishop of Cervia; 1582–1585	Succeeded by Decio Azzolini (seniore)
