= Lorenzo Trotti =

Roman Catholic prelate

Most Reverend Lorenzo Trotti
- Archbishop (Personal Title) of Pavia
- Church: Catholic Church
- In office: 1672–170
- Predecessor: Girolamo Melzi
- Successor: Giacomo Antonio Morigia
- Previous posts: Titular Archbishop of Cartagine (1666–1672); Apostolic Nuncio to Florence (1666–1668); Apostolic Nuncio to Venice (1668–1671)

Orders
- Consecration: 24 October 1666 by Benedetto Odescalchi

Personal details
- Born: 1633 Alessandria, Italy
- Died: 30 September 1700 (aged 66–67) Pavia, Italy

Lorenzo Trotti (1633 – 30 September 1700) was a Roman Catholic prelate who served as Archbishop (Personal Title) of Pavia (1672–1700), Apostolic Nuncio to Venice (1668–1671), Apostolic Nuncio to Florence (1666–1668), and Titular Archbishop of Carthage (1666–1672).

== Biography ==
Lorenzo Trotti was born in Alessandria, Italy in 1633. On 11 October 1666, he was appointed during the papacy of Pope Alexander VII as Titular Archbishop of Cartagine. On 24 October 1666, he was consecrated bishop by Benedetto Odescalchi, Cardinal-Priest of Sant'Onofrio. On 20 November 1666, he was appointed during the papacy of Pope Alexander VII as Apostolic Nuncio to Florence; he resigned on 25 April 1668. On 10 April 1668, he was appointed during the papacy of Pope Clement IX as Apostolic Nuncio to Venice; he resigned in April 1671. On 12 December 1672, he was appointed during the papacy of Pope Clement X as Archbishop (Personal Title) of Pavia. He served as Bishop of Pavia until his death on 30 September 1700.

== Episcopal succession ==
While bishop, he was the principal co-consecrator of:

- Victor Augustinus Ripa, Bishop of Vercelli (1679);
- Giuseppe Sallustio Fadulfi, Bishop of Amelia (1679);
- Giovan Donato Giannoni Alitto, Bishop of Ruvo (1680);
- Girolamo Prignano, Bishop of Satriano e Campagna (1680);
- Giovan Giorgio Mainardi, Bishop of Ripatransone (1680); and
- Giorgio Cornaro (cardinal), Titular Archbishop of Rhodus (1692).

== External links and additional sources ==
- Cheney, David M. "Diocese of Pavia". Catholic-Hierarchy.org. (for Chronology of Bishops) ^{[self-published]}
- Chow, Gabriel. "Diocese of Pavia (Italy)". GCatholic.org. (for Chronology of Bishops) ^{[self-published]}
- Cheney, David M. "Nunciature to Florence (Tuscany)". Catholic-Hierarchy.org. (for Chronology of Bishops) ^{[self-published]}
- Cheney, David M. "Nunciature to Venice". Catholic-Hierarchy.org. (for Chronology of Bishops) ^{[self-published]}

Catholic Church titles
Preceded by Scipione Costaguti	Titular Archbishop of Cartagine; 1666–1672	Succeeded by Jacques-Nicolas de Colbert
Preceded by Stefano Brancaccio	Apostolic Nuncio to Florence; 1666–1668	Succeeded by Opizio Pallavicini
Preceded by Stefano Brancaccio	Apostolic Nuncio to Venice; 1668–1671	Succeeded by Pompeo Varese
Preceded by Girolamo Melzi	Archbishop (Personal Title) of Pavia; 1672–1700	Succeeded by Giacomo Antonio Morigia
