= Raimondo del Pozzo =

Roman Catholic prelate

Most Reverend Raimondo del Pozzo
- Bishop of Vieste
- Church: Catholic Church
- Diocese: Diocese of Vieste
- In office: 1668–1694
- Predecessor: Giovanni Mastelloni
- Successor: Andrea Tontoli

Orders
- Ordination: 20 March 1649
- Consecration: 16 December 1668 by Pietro Vito Ottoboni

Personal details
- Born: 17 January 1622 Messina, Italy
- Died: 30 October 1694 (age 72) Vieste, Italy

Raimondo del Pozzo (17 January 1622 – 30 October 1694) was a Roman Catholic prelate who served as Bishop of Vieste (1668–1694).

== Biography ==
Raimondo del Pozzo was born in Messina, Italy on 17 January 1622 and ordained a priest on 20 March 1649. On 10 December 1668, he was appointed during the papacy of Pope Clement IX as Bishop of Vieste. On 16 December 1668, he was consecrated bishop by Pietro Vito Ottoboni, Cardinal-Priest of San Marco, with Giacomo Altoviti, Titular Patriarch of Antiochia and Stefano Brancaccio, Titular Archbishop of Hadrianopolis in Haemimonto, serving as co-consecrators. He served as Bishop of Vieste until his death on 30 October 1694.

== External links and additional sources ==
- Cheney, David M. "Diocese of Vieste". Catholic-Hierarchy.org. (for Chronology of Bishops) ^{[self-published]}
- Chow, Gabriel. "Diocese of Vieste (Italy)". GCatholic.org. (for Chronology of Bishops) ^{[self-published]}

Catholic Church titles
Preceded by Giovanni Mastelloni	Bishop of Vieste; 1668–1694	Succeeded by Andrea Tontoli
