= Stefano Brancaccio =

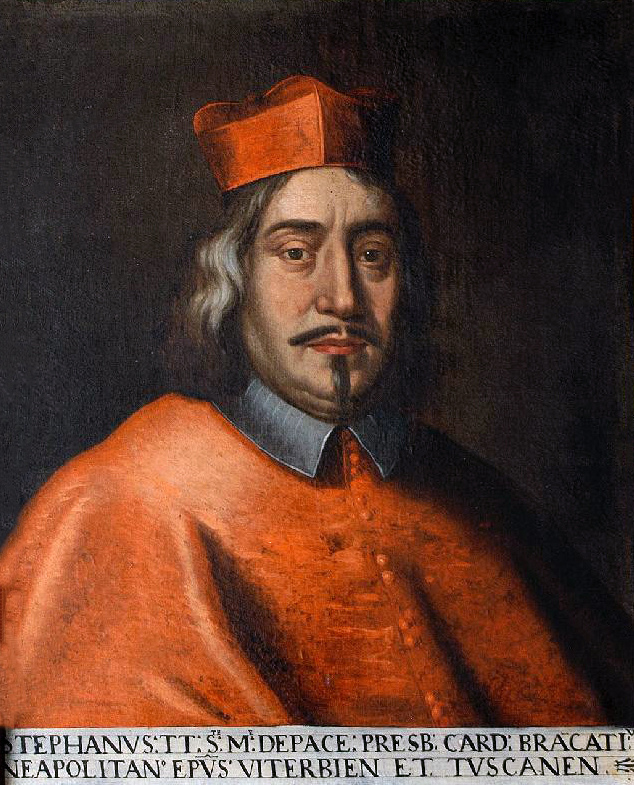
Stefano Brancaccio

Stefano Brancaccio (1618–1682) was a Roman Catholic cardinal.

On 1 January 1645, he was consecrated bishop by Francesco Barberini (seniore), Cardinal-Bishop of Porto e Santa Rufina. He served as titular Archbishop and nuncio, then became Archbishop (personal title) of Viterbo and Tuscany. In 1681, he concurrently became Cardinal.

== Episcopal succession ==
Episcopal succession of Stefano Brancaccio

While bishop, he was the principal consecrator of:

- Vincenzo Lanfranchi, Bishop of Trivento (1660);
- Tommaso Acquaviva d'Aragona, Bishop of Bitonto (1668);
- Giuseppe Spinucci, Bishop of Penne e Atri (1668);
- Angelo Maria Ranuzzi, Titular Archbishop of Tamiathis and Apostolic Nuncio to Savoy (1668);
- Leonardo Balsarini, Titular Bishop of Philadelphia in Arabia and Coadjutor Bishop of Chios (1668);
- Sebastiano Pisani (iuniore), Bishop of Verona (1668);
- Raimondo del Pozzo, Bishop of Vieste (1668);
- Bonaventura Cavalli, Bishop of Caserta (1668);
- Fulgenzio Arminio Monforte, Bishop of Nusco (1669);
- Marcantonio Vincentini, Bishop of Foligno (1669);
- Filippo Alferio Ossorio, Bishop of Fondi (1669);
- Giovanni Antonio Geloso, Bishop of Patti (1669);
- Vincenzo Maria da Silva, Bishop of Policastro (1671);
- John Brenan (archbishop), Bishop of Waterford and Lismore (1671);
- Giacinto Libelli, Archbishop of Avignon (1673);
- Carlo Francesco Airoldi, Titular Archbishop of Edessa in Osrhoëne (1673);
- Giuseppe Pianetti, Bishop of Todi (1673);
- Pietro Francesco Orsini de Gravina, Archbishop of Manfredonia (1675);
- Gregorio Giuseppe Gaetani de Aragonia, Titular Archbishop of Neocaesarea in Ponto (1676);
- Marziale Pellegrino, Titular Archbishop of Nazareth (1677);
- Manuel de la Torre (archbishop), Archbishop of Brindisi (1677);
- Jaime de Palafox y Cardona, Archbishop of Palermo (1677);
- Giovan Donato Giannoni Alitto, Bishop of Ruvo (1680);
- Girolamo Prignano, Bishop of Satriano e Campagna (1680);
- Giovan Giorgio Mainardi, Bishop of Ripatransone (1680);
- Tiberio Muscettola, Archbishop of Manfredonia (1680); and
- Giacinto Maria Passati, Bishop of Stagno (1680).

Catholic Church titles
Preceded by Giovanni de Torres	Titular Archbishop of Hadrianopolis in Haemimonto; 1660–1670	Succeeded by Francesco Nerli (iuniore)
Preceded by Antonio Pignatelli del Rastrello	Apostolic Nuncio to Florence; 1660–1666	Succeeded by Lorenzo Trotti
Preceded by Giacomo Altoviti	Apostolic Nuncio to Venice; 1666–1668	Succeeded by Lorenzo Trotti
Preceded by Francesco Maria Brancaccio	Archbishop (Personal Title) of Viterbo e Tuscania; 1670–1682	Succeeded by Urbano Sacchetti
Preceded by Giacomo Filippo Nini	Cardinal-Priest of Santa Maria della Pace; 1681–1682	Succeeded by Carlo Barberini
