= Petrus Draghi Bartoli =

17th-century Roman Catholic cleric

Most Reverend Petrus Draghi Bartoli
- Titular Patriarch of Alexandria
- Church: Catholic Church
- In office: 1690–1695
- Predecessor: Aloysius Bevilacqua
- Successor: Gregorio Giuseppe Gaetani de Aragonia

Orders
- Ordination: 28 December 1670
- Consecration: 19 November 1690 by Giambattista Rubini

Personal details
- Born: 23 July 1646 Venice, Italy
- Died: 13 April 1695 (aged 48)

Petrus Draghi Bartoli (23 July 1646 – 13 April 1695) was a Roman Catholic prelate who served as Titular Patriarch of Alexandria (1690–1695).

== Biography ==
Petrus Draghi Bartoli was born in Venice, Italy on 23 July 1646 and ordained a priest on 28 December 1670. On 13 November 1690, he was appointed during the papacy of Pope Alexander VIII as Titular Patriarch of Alexandria. On 19 November 1690, he was consecrated bishop by Giambattista Rubini, Bishop of Vicenza, with Ercole Visconti, Titular Archbishop of Tamiathis, and Franciscus Liberati, Titular Archbishop of Ephesus, serving as co-consecrators. He served as Titular Patriarch of Alexandria until his death on 13 April 1695.

== Episcopal succession ==
While bishop, he was the principal co-consecrator of:

- Marcantonio Agazzi, Bishop of Ceneda (1692);
- Paolo Vallaresso, Bishop of Concordia (1693);
- Andreas Riggio, Bishop of Catania (1693);
- Michelangelo Veraldi, Bishop of Martirano (1693);
- Gianfrancesco Bembo, Bishop of Belluno (1694);
- Pietro Alessandro Procaccini, Bishop of Ripatransone (1695);
- Joseph Simeon Cavagnini, Bishop of Trogir (1695);
- Vincentius degl'Atti, Bishop of Bagnoregio (1695); and
- Giovanni Giuseppe Camuzzi, Bishop of Orvieto (1695).

== External links and additional sources ==
- Cheney, David M. "Alexandria {Alessandria} (Titular See)". Catholic-Hierarchy.org. (for Chronology of Bishops)
- Chow, Gabriel. "Titular Patriarchal See of Alexandria (Egypt)". GCatholic.org. (for Chronology of Bishops)

Catholic Church titles
Preceded by Aloysius Bevilacqua	Titular Patriarch of Alexandria; 1690–1695	Succeeded by Gregorio Giuseppe Gaetani de Aragonia
