= Gregorio Giuseppe Gaetani de Aragonia =

Italian Roman Catholic prelate (1643–1710)

Most Reverend Gregorio Giuseppe Gaetani de Aragonia
- Titular Patriarch of Alexandria
- Church: Catholic Church
- In office: 1695–1710
- Predecessor: Petrus Draghi Bartoli
- Successor: Carlo Ambrogio Mezzabarba
- Previous posts: Titular Archbishop of Neocaesarea in Ponto (1676–1695); Apostolic Nuncio to Florence (1676–1678)

Orders
- Consecration: 15 March 1676 by Francesco Nerli (iuniore)

Personal details
- Born: 1643 Piedimonte Matese, Italy
- Died: 12 August 1710 (aged 66–67)

Gregorio Giuseppe Gaetani de Aragonia (1643–1710) was a Roman Catholic prelate who served as Titular Patriarch of Alexandria (1695–1710), Apostolic Nuncio to Florence (1676–1678), and Titular Archbishop of Neocaesarea in Ponto (1676–1695).

== Biography ==
Gregorio Giuseppe Gaetani de Aragonia was born in Piedimonte Matese, Italy in 1643. On 24 February 1676, he was appointed during the papacy of Pope Clement X as Titular Archbishop of Neocaesarea in Ponto. On 15 March 1676, he was consecrated bishop by Francesco Nerli (iuniore), Archbishop of Florence, with Antonio Pignatelli del Rastrello, Bishop of Lecce, and Stefano Brancaccio, Bishop of Viterbo e Tuscania, serving as co-consecrators. On 4 April 1676, he was appointed during the papacy of Pope Clement X as Apostolic Nuncio to Florence where he served until his resignation on 15 June 1678. On 2 May 1695, he was appointed during the papacy of Pope Innocent XII as Titular Patriarch of Alexandria. He served as Titular Patriarch of Alexandria until his death on 12 August 1710.

== Episcopal succession ==
While bishop, he was the principal co-consecrator of:

- Antonio Pérez de la Lastra, Bishop of Gallipoli (1679);
- Francesco Pignatelli, Archbishop of Taranto (1683);
- Giacomo Cantelmo, Titular Archbishop of Caesarea in Cappadocia (1683);
- Pietro Vecchia (bishop), Bishop of Andria (1690);
- Domenico de Zaoli (Zaulis), Bishop of Veroli (1690);
- Michele de Bologna, Bishop of Veroli (1690);
- Giorgio Cornaro (cardinal), Titular Archbishop of Rhodus (1692);
- Francesco Acquaviva d'Aragona, Titular Archbishop of Larissa in Thessalia (1697);
- Giulio Piazza, Titular Archbishop of Rhodus (1697); and
- Denis Delfino, Titular Bishop of Lorea and Coadjutor Patriarch of Aquileia (1698).

== External links and additional sources ==
- Cheney, David M. "Alexandria {Alessandria} (Titular See)". Catholic-Hierarchy.org. (for Chronology of Bishops)
- Chow, Gabriel. "Titular Patriarchal See of Alexandria (Egypt)". GCatholic.org. (for Chronology of Bishops)

Catholic Church titles
Preceded by Mario Alberizzi	Titular Archbishop of Neocaesarea in Ponto; 1676–1695	Succeeded by Alessandro Sforza
Preceded by Carlo Francesco Airoldi	Apostolic Nuncio to Florence; 1676–1678	Succeeded by Ercole Visconti
Preceded by Petrus Draghi Bartoli	Titular Patriarch of Alexandria; 1695–1710	Succeeded by Carlo Ambrogio Mezzabarba
