= Giacomo Altoviti =

Italian religious and Catholic prelate

Most Reverend Giacomo Altoviti
- Titular Patriarch of Antiochia
- Church: Catholic Church
- In office: 1667–1693
- Predecessor: Fabio Lagonissa
- Successor: Michelangelo Mattei
- Previous posts: Titular Archbishop of Athenae (1658–1667); Apostolic Nuncio to Venice (1658–1666)

Orders
- Consecration: 11 August 1658 by Giulio Cesare Sacchetti

Personal details
- Born: 1604 Florence, Italy
- Died: 18 May 1693 (aged 88–89)

Giacomo Altoviti (1604 – 18 May 1693) was a Roman Catholic prelate who served as Titular Patriarch of Antiochia (1667–1693), Apostolic Nuncio to Venice (1658–1666), and Titular Archbishop of Athenae (1658–1667).

== Biography ==
Giacomo Altoviti was born in 1604 in Florence. His father was Lorenzo Altoviti, a rich papal banker, Florentine senator and preferred nephew of his uncle cardinal Giovanni Bonsi. His father was also the brother of Francesca Sacchetti Altoviti, mother of the late cardinal Giulio Cesare Sacchetti and Marcelo Sacchetti, papal treasurer of Urban VIII.

Giacomo Altoviti attended the Roman seminary and became a close friend to Fabio Chigi. Giacomo Altoviti followed his friend when Fabio Chigi was appointed by Urban VIII papal legate to Ferrara and in Mata, when his friend and protector was sent there in 1635 as inquisitor and apostolic visitor. He also took part in Fabio Chigi appointment to the cardinalate, using his influence with his cousin cardinal Giulio Cesare Sacchetti, who had already had the opportunity to appreciate Chigi's talents and to conceive a profound esteem for him. Later the Altoviti and Sacchetti supported Fabio Chigi in the negotiations and conclave of that led to his election as Pope Alexander VII.

Giacomo Altoviti career flourished. On 29 July 1658, he was appointed during the papacy of Pope Alexander VII as Titular Archbishop of Athenae. On 11 August 1658, he was consecrated by his cousin Giulio Cesare Sacchetti, Cardinal-Bishop of Sabina. On 21 September 1658, he was appointed during the papacy of Pope Alexander VII as Apostolic Nuncio to Venice. He resigned as Apostolic Nuncio to Venice on 22 April 1666. On 18 April 1667, he was appointed during the papacy of Pope Alexander VII as Titular Patriarch of Antiochia.

He served as Titular Patriarch of Antiochia until his death on 18 May 1693.

== Episcopal succession ==
Episcopal succession of Giacomo Altoviti

While bishop, he was the principal co-consecrator of:

- Giuseppe Maria Maraviglia, Bishop of Novara (1667);
- Angelo Maria Ranuzzi, Titular Archbishop of Tamiathis (1668);
- Leonardo Balsarini, Titular Archbishop of Philadelphia in Arabia (1668);
- Sebastiano Pisani (iuniore), Bishop of Verona (1668);
- Raimondo del Pozzo, Bishop of Vieste (1668);
- Filippo Soldani, Bishop of Fiesole (1670);
- Ludovicus Giustiniani, Bishop of Assisi (1670);
- Mario Alberizzi, Titular Archbishop of Neocaesarea in Ponto (1671);
- Giovanni Rasino, Bishop of Vigevano (1671);
- Tommaso de Franchi, Bishop of Melfi e Rapolla (1671);
- Johann Eberhard Nidhard, Titular Archbishop of Edessa in Osrhoëne (1672);
- Diego de Castrillo, Bishop of Cádiz (1673);
- Louis d'Anglure de Bourlemont, Bishop of Fréjus (1679);
- Victor Augustinus Ripa, Bishop of Vercelli (1679);
- Giuseppe Sallustio Fadulfi, Bishop of Amelia (1679);
- Lorenzo Raggi, Cardinal-Bishop of Palestrina (1680);
- Francesco Berardino Corradini, Bishop of Marsi (1680);
- Pier Matteo Petrucci, Bishop of Jesi (1681);
- Urbano Sacchetti, Bishop of Viterbo e Tuscania (1683);
- Horatius Ondedei, Bishop of Urbania e Sant'Angelo in Vado (1684).

Catholic Church titles
Preceded by Nicolò Guidi di Bagno	Titular Archbishop of Athenae; 1658–1667	Succeeded by Carlo de' Vecchi
Preceded by Carlo Carafa della Spina	Apostolic Nuncio to Venice; 1658–1666	Succeeded by Stefano Brancaccio
Preceded by Fabio Lagonissa	Titular Patriarch of Antiochia; 1667–1716	Succeeded by Michelangelo Mattei
