= Aloysius Bevilacqua =

17th-century Roman Catholic bishop

Most Reverend Aloysius Bevilacqua
- Titular Patriarch of Alexandria
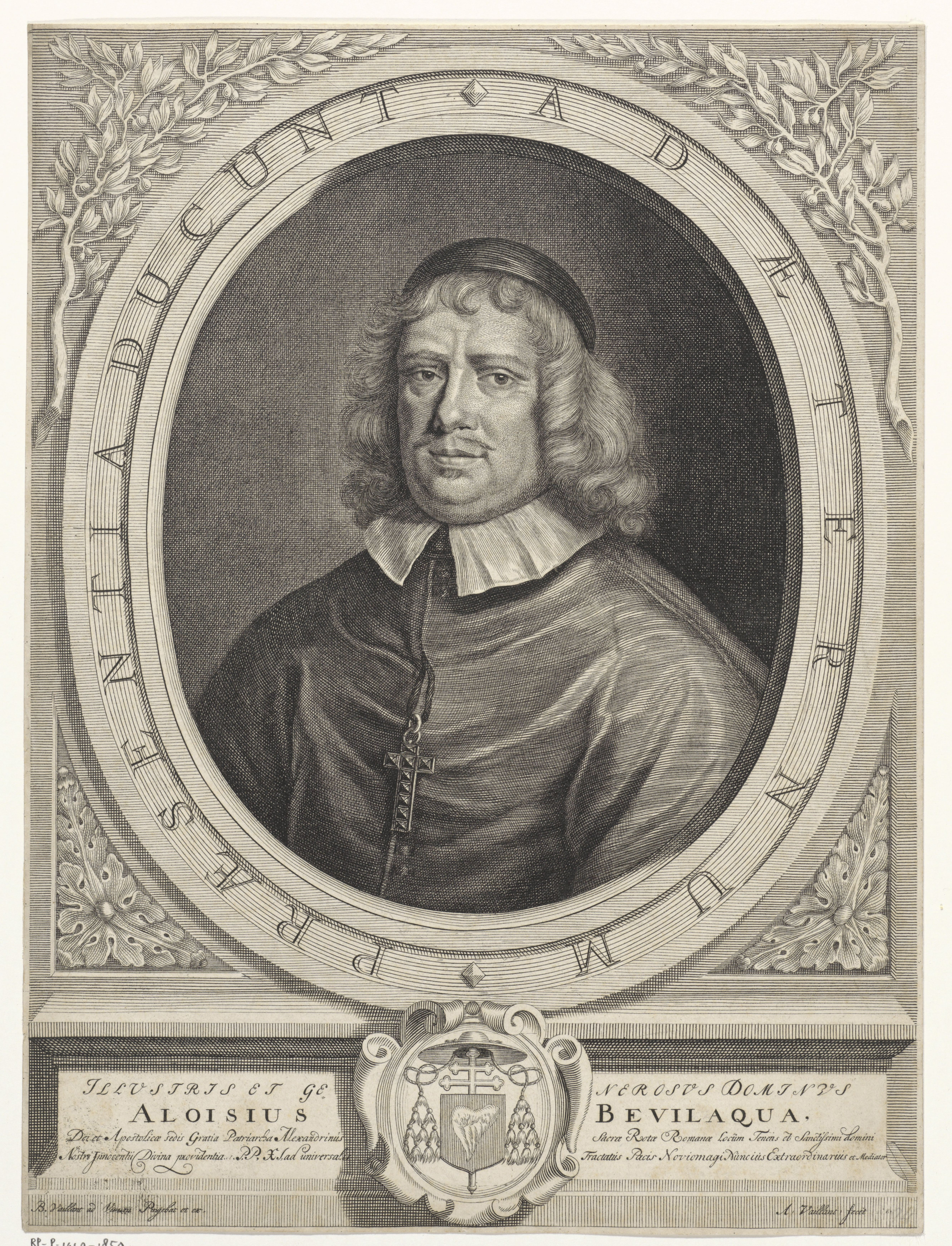
- Portret van Aloysius Bevilacqua
- Church: Catholic Church
- Archdiocese: Latin Patriarchate of Alexandria
- In office: 1675–1679
- Predecessor: Alessandro Crescenzi
- Successor: Petrus Draghi Bartoli

Orders
- Consecration: 25 Feb 1676 by Mario Alberizzi

Personal details
- Born: 1618 Ferrara, Italy
- Died: 21 April 1679 (aged 60–61) Rome

Aloysius Bevilacqua (1618–1679) was a Roman Catholic prelate who served as Titular Patriarch of Alexandria (1675–1680).

== Biography ==
Aloysius Bevilacqua was born in 1618 in Ferrara, Italy. On 30 Sep 1675, he was appointed during the papacy of Pope Clement X as Titular Patriarch of Alexandria. On 25 Feb 1676, he was consecrated bishop by Mario Alberizzi, Cardinal-Priest, with Domenico Gianuzzi, Titular Bishop of Dioclea in Phrygia, and Giacomo Buoni, Bishop of Montefeltro, serving as co-consecrators. He served as Titular Patriarch of Alexandria until his death on 21 Apr 1679.

As the diplomatic representative of Innocent XI Bevilacqua, assisted by future cardinal Lorenzo Casoni was papal nuncio at the peace Congress of Nijmegen 1678–79, intermediating between the Austrian, Spanish and other Catholic delegations there.

== External links and additional sources ==
- Cheney, David M. "Alexandria {Alessandria} (Titular See)". Catholic-Hierarchy.org. (for Chronology of Bishops) ^{[self-published]}
- Chow, Gabriel. "Titular Patriarchal See of Alexandria (Egypt)". GCatholic.org. (for Chronology of Bishops) ^{[self-published]}

Catholic Church titles
Preceded by Alessandro Crescenzi	Titular Patriarch of Alexandria; 1675–1680	Succeeded by Petrus Draghi Bartoli
