= Leonardo Balsarini =

Roman Catholic archbishop

Most Reverend Leonardo Balsarini
- Latin Archbishop of Corinth
- Church: Catholic Church
- In office: 1698–1699
- Predecessor: Francesco Martelli
- Successor: Angelo Maria Carlini

Orders
- Consecration: 24 June 1668 by Cesare Facchinetti

Personal details
- Born: 1636 Chios, Greece
- Died: December 1699 (aged 63)

Leonardo Balsarini (1636 – December 1699) was a Roman Catholic prelate who served as Latin Archbishop of Corinth (1698–1699), Roman Catholic Bishop of Chios (1686–1698), and Titular Bishop of Philadelphia in Arabia (1668–1686).

== Biography ==
Leonardo Balsarini was born in Chios, Greece in 1636. On 14 May 1668, he was appointed during the papacy of Pope Clement IX as Coadjutor Roman Catholic Bishop of Chios and Titular Bishop of Philadelphia in Arabia. On 24 June 1668, he was consecrated bishop by Cesare Facchinetti, Bishop of Spoleto, with Giacomo Altoviti, Titular Patriarch of Antiochia, and Stefano Brancaccio, Titular Archbishop of Hadrianopolis in Haemimonto, serving as co-consecrators.

In March 1686, he succeeded to the bishopric of Chios. On 19 December 1698, he resigned as Bishop of Chios and was appointed during the papacy of Pope Innocent XI as Latin Archbishop of Corinth. He died in December 1699.

While bishop, he was the principal co-consecrator of Nikola Bijanković, Bishop of Makarska (1699).

Catholic Church titles
Preceded by Dominique de Ligni	Titular Bishop of Philadelphia in Arabia; 1668–1686	Succeeded by François-Joseph de Grammont
Preceded by Andrea Soffiani	Roman Catholic Bishop of Chios; 1686–1698	Succeeded by Tomaso Giustiniani
Preceded by Francesco Martelli	Latin Archbishop of Corinth; 1698–1699	Succeeded by Angelo Maria Carlini
