= Antonio Francesco Sanvitale =

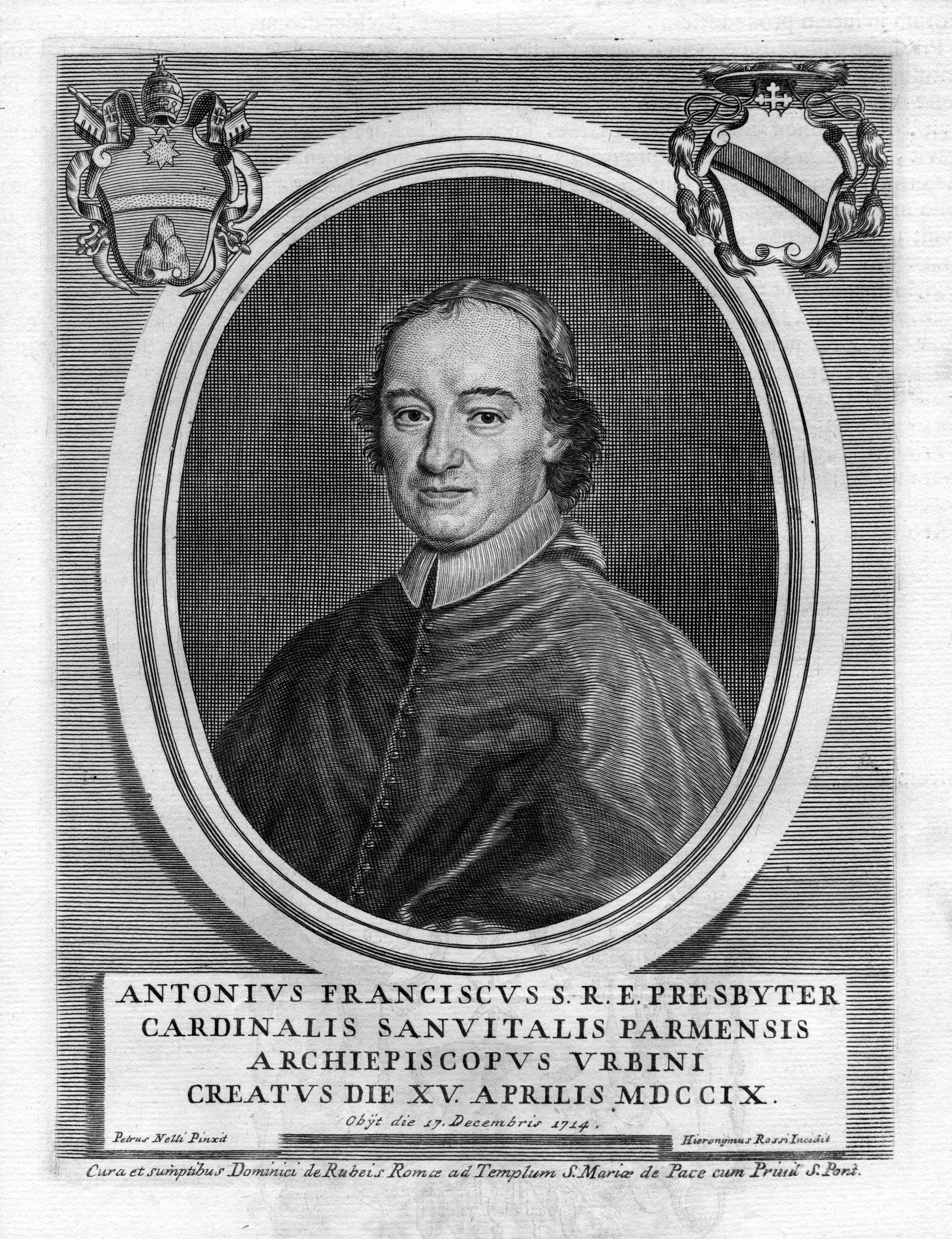
Antonio Francesco Sanvitale.jpg

Antonio Francesco Sanvitale (10 February 1660 – 17 December 1714) was a cardinal of the Roman Catholic Church from 1709.

== Life ==
Antonio Francesco was born in Parma. Descended from a prominent family, including Galeazzo Sanvitale, in the duchy. He was an archbishop of Urbino. He served as nuncio to Tuscany, and vice-legate to Avignon.

He was born in Parma on 10 February 1660, in the noble Sanvitale family and had the title of Count of Fontanellato.

He graduated in utroque iure at the University of Parma. He was named mayor of the Vatican Basilica under the pontificate of Innocent XI.

On 27 December 1699, he was ordained a priest. On 15 March 1700, he was appointed vice-tied to Avignon.

He was elected, on 16 July 1703, Archbishop of Ephesus, On the 22nd of the same month he was consecrated by Fabrizio Paolucci and was then transferred to the metropolitan headquarters in Urbino on 6 May 1709.

On 17 July 1703, a nuncio was created in Florence for him. For many years during his stay in Austria, his secretary was Gaetano Bedini who would later be a Cardinal himself.

Pope Clement XI created him cardinal in pectore in the consistory of 15 April 1709 and published the nomination on 22 July the same year. On 9 September that year, he received the title of St. Peter in Montorio.

He died in Urbino on 17 December 1714, at the age of 54 and was buried in the cathedral of the city.

== Episcopal succession ==
Episcopal succession of Antonio Francesco Sanvitale

While bishop, he was the principal co-consecrator of:

- Nicola Gaetano Spinola, Titular Archbishop of Thebae and Apostolic Nuncio to Florence (1706);
- Pier Marcellino Corradini, Titular Archbishop of Athenae (1707); and
- Alessandro Aldobrandini, Titular Archbishop of Rhodus (1707).
