= Marcantonio Marcolini =

Italian Catholic bishop and cardinal

His Eminence Marcantonio Marcolini
- Cardinal-Priest of Sant'Onofrio
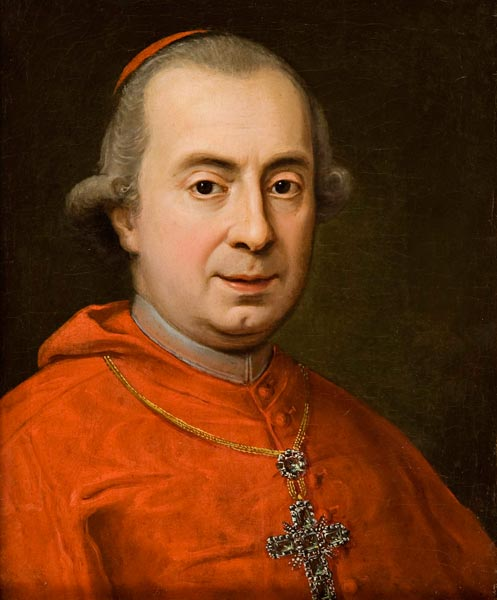
- Church: Catholic Church
- Appointed: 28 July 1777
- Term ended: 18 June 1782
- Predecessor: Giovanni Angelo Braschi
- Successor: Giovanni Battista Caprara
- Previous posts: Apostolic Nuncio to Florence (1769–1771)

Orders
- Ordination: 27 February 1768
- Consecration: 25 June 1769 by Henry Benedict Stuart
- Created cardinal: 23 June 1777 by Pope Pius VI
- Rank: Cardinal-Priest

Personal details
- Born: 22 November 1721 Fano, Italy
- Died: 1 May 1782 (aged 60) Fano, Italy

Marcantonio Marcolini (1721–1782) was an Italian Catholic bishop and cardinal.

== Biography ==
Marcantonio Marcolini was born in Fano on 22 November 1721, the son of Count Pietro Paolo Marcolini and Ana Maria Francesca Ferretti, of the counts of Castel Ferretto.

He graduated from the Collegio di San Carlo in Modena on 22 October 1732; from the Pontifical Ecclesiastical Academy in 1740; and then received a doctorate of both laws from the Sapienza University of Rome on 3 July 1742.

After graduating, he became a privy chamberlain supernumerary of Pope Benedict XIV. In 1743, he was sent to Paris as papal legate to take the red hat to Cardinal Marcello Crescenzi, Apostolic Nuncio to France. In 1744, he became a canon of the Basilica di Santa Maria Maggiore. On 28 August 1747, he became Referendary of the Apostolic Signatura. He was made Relator of the Sacred Congregation of Good Government in July 1748. In 1751, he traveled through Germany and Saxony. He became a judge of the Reverend Fabric of Saint Peter's basilica in November 1752, becoming its secretary in December 1756. He became a canon of St. Peter's Basilica in April 1754. In December 1755, he became Voter of the Tribunal of the Apostolic Signatura.

He was ordained as a priest on 27 February 1768.

He was elected titular archbishop of Thessalonica on 12 June 1769, and was consecrated as a bishop by Cardinal Henry Benedict Stuart on 25 June 1769. Shortly thereafter, Pope Clement XIV made him an Assistant at the Pontifical Throne. On 23 August 1769, he became Apostolic Nuncio to Florence. He later returned to Rome, becoming secretary of the Sacred Consulta on 16 February 1771. On 18 May 1773, he became auditor of the Apostolic Camera. He was made president of Urbino on 2 May 1775.

In the consistory of 23 June 1777, Pope Pius VI made him a cardinal. He received the red hat on 26 June 1777, and on 28 July 1777 received the titular church of Sant'Onofrio. He remained pro-president of Urbino until June 1778.

While visiting Fano, he suffered from apoplexy on 1 May 1782. He died in Fano on 18 June 1782.
