= Bernardino Honorati =

Italian Catholic bishop and cardinal

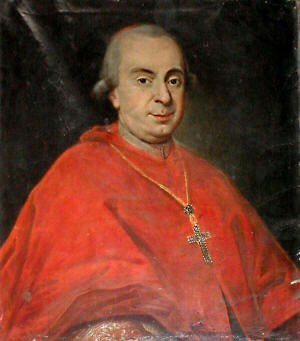
- Born: July 17, 1724; Iesi, Papal States
- Died: August 12, 1807 (aged 83); Senigallia, Papal States
- Occupation: Cardinal

Bernardino Honorati (1724–1807) was an Italian Catholic bishop and cardinal.

== Biography ==
Bernardino Honorati was born in Iesi on July 17, 1724, the son of Marquis Giuseppe Honorati, a patrician from Iesi, and Marianna Cima, a noblewoman from Rimini.

He was educated at Rome. In February 1744, he delivered an oration before Pope Benedict XIV and the College of Cardinals upon the occasion of the Feast of the Chair of Saint Peter; this oration was later published. During this period, he served as a consistorial advocate, and then spent four years as secretary of the Dean of the Roman Rota. He entered the papal household on December 23, 1746, becoming a chamberlain of honor. In 1747, he served as a papal legate to take the red hat to the new Cardinal de Soubise. He received a doctorate of both laws from the Sapienza University of Rome on February 10, 1749.

On July 10, 1749, he was appointed Referendary of the Apostolic Signatura. He became relator of the Sacred Congregation of Good Government on November 26, 1750. He served as vice-legate of Romagna from January 13, 1755, to October 1756. In September 1756, he was named relator of the Sacred Consulta, taking possession of the office upon his return to Rome. He then served as governor of Loreto from January 28, 1758, until December 19, 1759.

He was ordained as a priest on December 31, 1759. On January 28, 1760, he was elected titular archbishop of Side; he was consecrated as a bishop by Giovanni Antonio Bacchettoni, Bishop of Recanati and Loreto.

On April 24, 1760, Pope Clement XIII made Honorati Apostolic Nuncio to Florence. On November 20, 1766, he became nuncio in Venice. He returned to Rome after he was appointed secretary of the Secretary of the Sacred Congregation of Bishops and Regulars on September 1, 1775.

In the consistory of June 23, 1777, Pope Pius VI named him a cardinal, and he received the red hat on June 26, 1777, and the titular church of Santi Marcellino e Pietro al Laterano on July 28, 1777.

He was translated to the See of Senigallia on July 28, 1777, but was allowed to retain the title of archbishop. He celebrated a diocesan synod in May 1791.

He participated in the papal conclave of 1799–1800 that elected Pope Pius VII.

He died in Senigallia on August 12, 1807.
