= Filippo Archinto =

Italian theologian (1495–1559)

His Excellency Filippo Archinto
- Archbishop of Milan
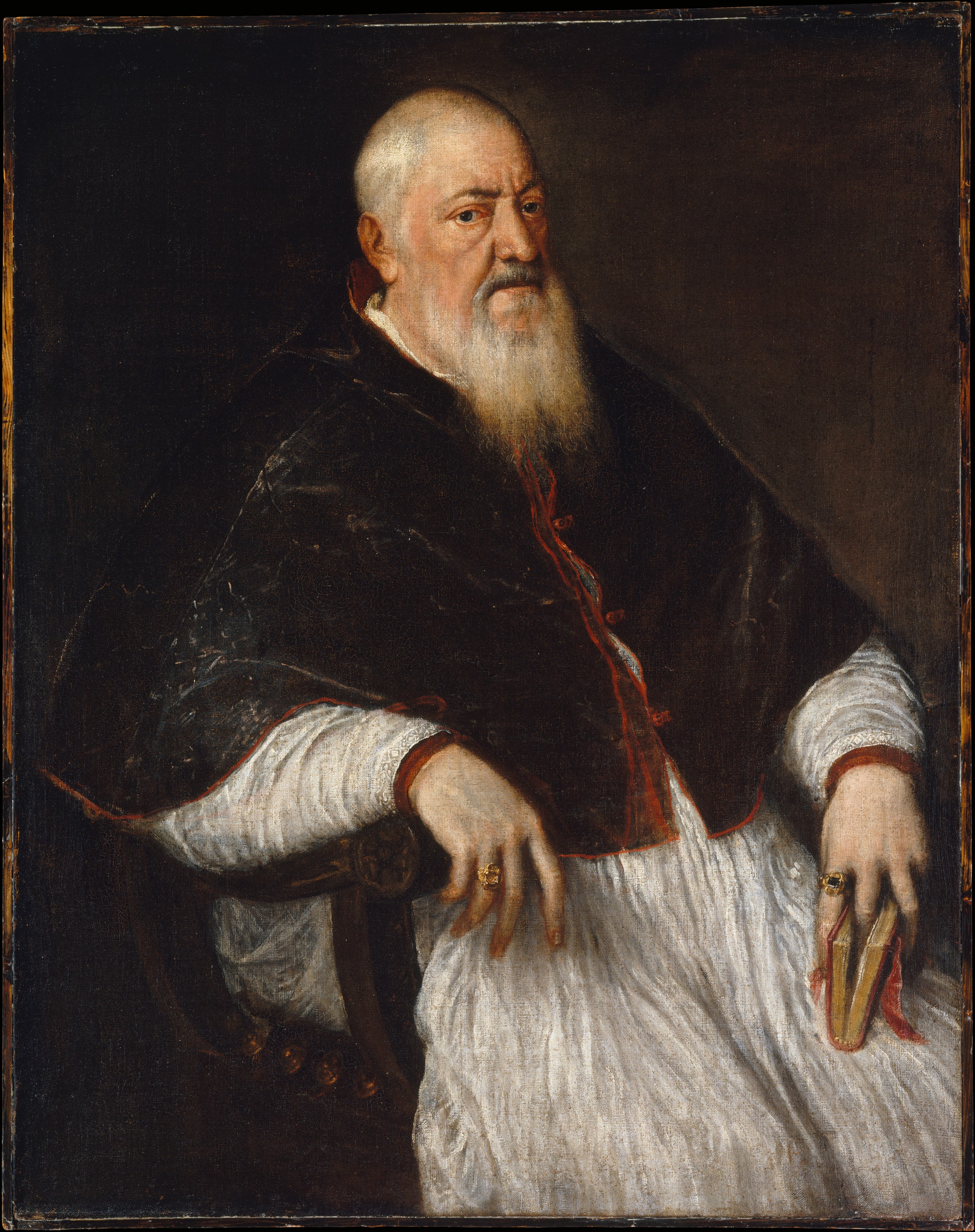
- Titian, Portrait of Archbishop Filippo Archinto (mid-1550s), Metropolitan Museum of Art, New York
- Archdiocese: Milan
- In office: 1556–58
- Predecessor: Giovan Angelo Arcimboldi
- Successor: Carlo Borromeo

Personal details
- Born: July 5, 1495 Milan, Italy
- Died: 1558 (aged 62–63)
- Occupation: Lawyer, papal bureaucrat, bishop, and diplomat

Filippo Archinto (1495–1558), born in Milan, was an Italian lawyer, papal bureaucrat, bishop, and diplomat. He served as Governor of Rome and then papal Vicar of Rome. He was personally esteemed both by the Emperor Charles V and by Pope Paul III. He was Bishop of Borgo San Sepolcro (1539–1546), Bishop of Saluzzo (1546–1556), and Archbishop of Milan (1556–1558).

== Biography ==
Archinto was born on 5 July 1495. He was the second son of Cristoforo Archinto, whose ancestor Manfredo had helped found the monastery of Chiaravalle near Milan in 1135, and Maddalena Torriani. His brothers were Giovanni Battista, who was a soldier and an ambassador of the Emperor Charles V, and Alessandro, who became a regional quaestor in the city of Milan.

Filippo was sent by his father to study at Pavia, but at the age of 20 he was summoned back to Milan to be at his father's deathbed. He returned to Pavia, and then spent some time studying at Bologna, though he returned to Pavia to take his degree. He obtained a doctorate in law. He returned to Milan and was admitted to the College of Legists.

=== Diplomat ===
In 1529, he was a member of an embassy sent by the city of Milan to the Emperor Charles V at Barcelona, to advise the Emperor of the loyalty of the Milanese and to inform him of their needs. He then attended the Coronation of the Emperor in Bologna as a representative of Milan.

In 1535, on the death of Francesco II, the last of the Sforza dukes of Milan, Archinto was chosen by the city for an embassy to inform the Emperor Charles V, and to negotiate the future of Milan as part of the Emperor's domains. The Milanese embassy met the Emperor in Naples, where Charles was celebrating the marriage of his daughter Marguerite to Alessandro de'Medici. Charles V was sufficiently impressed with Filippo that he named him an imperial councillor. He also appointed Archinto to an embassy to Pope Paul III, to negotiate the succession to the Marquisate of Monferrato.

=== Papal official ===
Archinto revealed such talents for diplomacy that Pope Paul III named him a Protonotary Apostolic partecipante. On 6 May 1538, Archinto was appointed Vice-Chamberlain of the Holy Roman Church and Governor of the city of Rome. Among others, he was granted, as abbot commendatory, the benefices of the abbey of S. Giovanni Battista di Vertemate (diocese of Como) and the abbey of S. Bartolomeo in Pavia.

When Paul III set off for Nice to meet Charles V and Francis I of France in an effort to arrange a peace, he took Archinto with him, with the title of Governor of the Court. The journey began on 23 March 1538. A truce was signed on 18 June. When the last legitimate duke of Camerino died, Pope Paul, intending to reclaim the duchy for the church, sent Archinto as Governor of the city of Camerino to negotiate with the pretender, Mattia de Varano. He spent six months reforming the city, but he was back in Rome in 1539, and preached the funeral oration for the Empress Isabella, wife of Charles V, who had died on 1 May 1539.

On 26 February 1539, he was appointed to the Congregation for the Fabric of S. Peter's.

=== Bishop ===
On 19 March 1539, Pope Paul named Archinto Bishop of Borgo San Sepolcro (1539–1546). This did not mean that Bishop Archinto would be spending his time in a small diocese in southeastern Tuscany. On 3 November 1542, by the bull "Licet ecclesiarum omnium", the Pope named him his Vicar for the city of Rome.

Pope Paul III also sent the Bishop of Borgo San Sepolcro to the Council of Trent, whose meetings had been transferred to Bologna. He was appointed to a "Commission of vigilance," whose purpose was to collect public and private information about the doings of the council and of its members. When the council was suspended, Archinto returned to Rome.

On 19 October 1546, by the bull "Cum sicut accepimus", he was transferred to the diocese of Saluzzo, though he was still serving as papal Vicar of the city of Rome. Savio provides evidence to indicate that the bishop visited the diocese, and held a diocesan synod in 1546 and a pastoral visitation in the next year. He had a Vicar General, however, Silvestro Tapparelli, who was a protonotary apostolic, who administered the diocese when Archinto was in Rome. As the new bishop, Archinto sought to acquire for the episcopal income the properties which had been designated by Pope Julius II when he created the diocese of Saluzzo. This particularly involved the Cistercian monastery of S. Antonio, which had long resisted complying with Pope Julius' bull. The bishop used his influence as the second ranking official in the Apostolic Camera to obtain a decree on 3 November 1546, which ordered the monks to vacate the monastery and turn the properties over to the bishop; the monks appealed to Pope Julius III, but lost their suit. They continued to resist, and remained in occupation, despite being excommunicated, throughout Archinto's episcopacy. In 1551, he instituted proceedings before the Auditor of the Apostolic Camera against the collegiate church of Carmagnola, which, when the church belonged to the diocese of Turin, owed the bishop of Turin an annual pension of 20 ducats. Naturally the Chapter appealed, and the suit dragged on long after Archinto's term. In 1548, the marquessate of Saluzzo, under French occupation, surrendered to Henry II and was annexed by France.

St. Ignatius Loyola found in him a powerful protector in the early years of the Society of Jesus. In 1548, as Vicar of the city, he was a member of the commission that reviewed Ignatius' book, Spiritual Exercises.

From 1554 to 1556, Archinto served as papal Nuncio with the authority of a Legatus a latere to the Serene Republic of Venice.

Archinto was appointed Archbishop of Milan, on the recommendation of King Philip II, by Pope Paul IV on 16 December 1556. Pope Paul and the Spanish were on bad terms, however, and the Spanish governor of Milan, Juan de Fonseca, refused to admit the new archbishop to the city, alleging that he had no instructions from the King on the subject of Archinto, and needed to send to Spain for new orders. Archinto therefore withdrew to Bergamo, whose bishop, Victor Superantius, had been deposed for heresy. As the Metropolitan, he assumed administratorship of that church. The Pope granted him the use of the pallium (a symbolic decorative scarf) on 20 September 1577. The King finally replied to Fonseca with definitive orders on 15 January 1558, and on 8 February Fonseca wrote to Archinto, promising him a splendid possessio ceremony, in which he himself would take part. His death at Bergamo of a lenta febre on 21 June 1558 prevented his installation in the archiepiscopal chair of Milan.

His published works include De fide et sacramentis edictum (Rome 1545; Cracow, 1545; Ingolstadt 1546; Turin, 1549), issued in his capacity as Vicar of the city of Rome; and Oratio de nova christiani orbis pace habita (Rome, 1544), a speech given in the presence of Pope Paul III, lauding his efforts to bring peace between Francis I of France and the Emperor Charles V.

== Bibliography ==
- Archinto, Filippo (1544). De noua christiani orbis pace oratio (in Latin). Rome: apud Antonium Bladum.
- Archinto, Filippo (1546). Christianum de fide et sacramentis edictum (in Latin). Ingolstadt: Alexander Weissenborn.
- Giussano, Giovanni Pietro (1611). Vita dell'illustrissimo et reuerendissimo monsignor Filippo Archinto Arciuescouo di Milano (in Italian). Como: appresso Ieronimo Froua.
- Picinelli, Filippo (1670). Ateneo dei letterati milanesi. Milan: Francesco Vigone. p. 189.
- Santarelli, Daniele, ed. (2010). La nunziatura di Venezia sotto il papato di Paolo IV: la corrispondenza di Filippo Archinto e Antonio Trivulzio (1555–1557) (in Italian). Roma: Aracne. ISBN 978-88-548-3082-0.
- Savio, Carlo Fedele (1911). Saluzzo e i suoi vescovi, 1475-1601. Saluzzo: Fratelli Lobeto Bodoni. (in Italian) [pp. 206–219]
- Saxius [Sasso], Josephus Antonius (1755). Archiepiscoporum mediolanensium series historico-chronologica (in Latin). Vol. Tomus tertius. Milan: in Regia Curia ex Aedibus Palatinis. pp. 1009–1016.

=== External links ===
- Alberigo, Giuseppe (1961). "Archinto, Filippo". Dizionario Biografico degli Italiani Volume 3 (1961) (in Italian)
