= Giuseppe Archinto =

Italian diplomat, Cardinal and Archbishop

His Eminence Giuseppe Archinto
- Cardinal, Archbishop of Milan
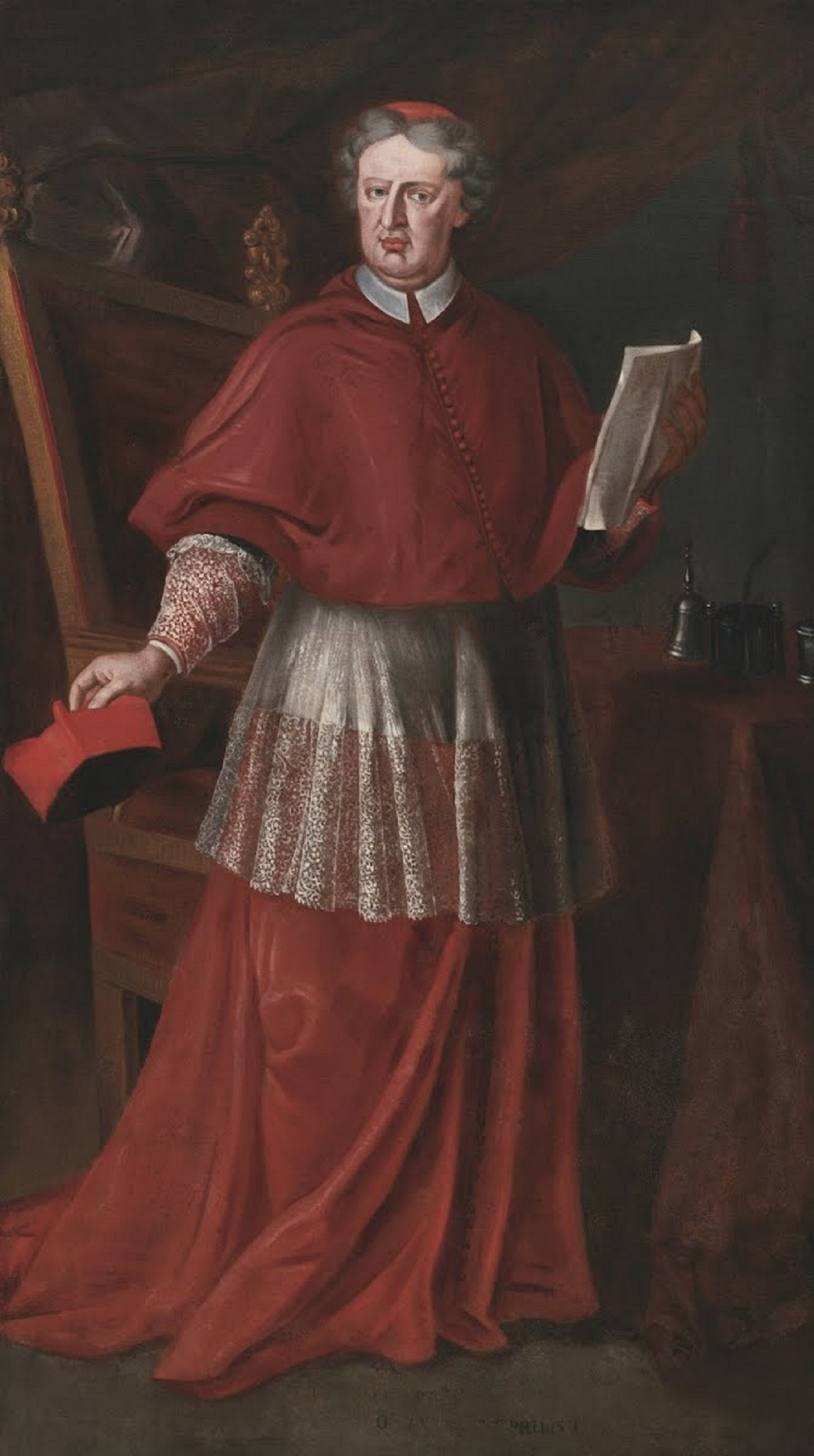
- Church: Catholic Church
- See: Milan
- Appointed: 18 May 1699
- Term ended: 9 April 1712
- Predecessor: Federico Caccia
- Successor: Benedetto Erba Odescalchi
- Other post: Cardinal Priest of Santa Prisca

Orders
- Consecration: 31 March 1686 (Bishop) by Flavio Chigi
- Created cardinal: 14 November 1699

Personal details
- Born: 17 April 1651 Milan
- Died: 9 April 1712 (aged 60) Milan
- Buried: Cathedral of Milan
- Coat of arms

Giuseppe Archinto (or Archinti; 1651–1712) was an Italian diplomat, Cardinal and Archbishop of Milan from 1699 to 1712.

== Early life ==
Giuseppe Archinto was born in Milan on 9 April 1651 (or on 7 May according to other sources). He studied under the Jesuits in the College of Brera in Milan. In 1665 he entered in the Pontifical Roman Seminary in Rome. Later he studied for two years in University of Ingolstadt in Germany. He lived also one year in Vienna and took the opportunity to visit also Hungary, Denmark, France, England and Spain.

Returned in Italy, he earned a doctorate in utroque iure at the University of Pavia on 14 September 1675 and became a lawyer. In this period he moved to Rome where he entered in the administration of the Papal States: in 1679 he became protonotary apostolic, and in 1683 he became referendary of the Tribunals of the Apostolic Signature. From 1679 to 1683 he served as Vice-legate of Bologna. During this service in one occasion he escaped from Bologna alarmed by the heavy expenses he had to bear: however Pope Innocent XI not only forgave him, but appointed him titular archbishop of Thessalonica on 18 March 1686. His episcopal consecration was conferred in Rome on 31 March 1686 by Cardinal Flavio Chigi.

Following his appointment as titular bishop, in April 1686 he was appointed Apostolic Nuncio to the Grand Duchy of Tuscany where he served up December 1689. Then he was moved to the nunciature to the Republic of Venice where he remained up to January 1696. From Venice he was sent as Nuncio to the Kingdom of Spain where he remained until August 1700. In Spain he suggested to Charles II of Spain to appoint as successor Philip, Duke of Anjou of the French House of Bourbon.

== Archbishop of Milan ==
On 18 May 1699, Giuseppe Archinto was appointed Archbishop of Milan, however he entered in Milan only on 24 July 1700 due to his ongoing diplomatic services. On 14 November 1699, he was appointed Cardinal Priest of Santa Prisca. He participated to the 1700 papal conclave.

His episcopate overlapped with the War of the Spanish Succession, and even if Archinto was himself a supporter of the Spanish rule over the Duchy of Milan, he had in 1706 to welcome Prince Eugene of Savoy who conquered the North-East Italy for the Holy Roman Empire coalition, thus starting the transition from the Spanish to the Habsburg government of Milan. Archinto in 1708 and again in 1711 imposed an extraordinary taxation on the diocese in order to financially support the Holy Roman Empire coalition.

As archbishop, he focused on the instruction of the clergy. He required (1703) a further examination in front of himself to all candidates to the holy orders. He ordered a census of the wills in favor of the clergy and imposed to the parish priests the teaching of the catechism every Sunday.

He died in Milan on 9 April 1712. His remains were buried in the Archinto Chapel in the North transept of the Cathedral of Milan, near the sepulcher of his predecessor Filippo Archinto.
