= Latin Patriarchate of Alexandria =

Ecclesiastical jurisdiction of the Roman Catholic Church

Patriarchate of Alexandria
- Bishopric

catholic

Information
- Established: 1310
- Dissolved: 1964
- Cathedral: Basilica of Saint Paul Outside the Walls

The Latin Patriarchate of Alexandria was a nominal patriarchate of the Latin Church on the see of Alexandria in Egypt.

== History ==
=== Origins ===
Alexandria, a major Egyptian city during Classical antiquity, was an influential early Christian diocese. It was founded, according to Church tradition, by Saint Mark the Evangelist. From the First Council of Nicaea onward, Alexandria enjoyed honors roughly equal with Rome and Antioch, as one of three Petrine sees. Following Emperor Justinian I's establishment of the Pentarchy, Alexandria was considered third in honor, after Rome and Constantinople.

Despite the rupture of communion between Rome and Constantinople in 1054, the remaining patriarchates initially remained in communion with Rome. Antioch and Jerusalem broke communion in 1098 and 1099, respectively, when crusaders forcibly deposed the sitting bishops, and Latin bishops took their place, creating the Latin Patriarchates of Antioch and Jerusalem.

There is little direct evidence concerning Alexandria's relationship with Rome. However, by inference, historians may conclude that the Alexandrine patriarch communed Latins for a time after 1054, and kept the pope's name on the communion diptychs. This is confirmed by Patriarch Nicholas I sending representatives to the Fourth Lateran Council. There is no direct evidence that either Alexandria or Rome repudiated the other; however, Rome's appointing of a Latin patriarch in 1310 implies communion between the two must have ceased by that date.

=== Patriarch in Rome ===
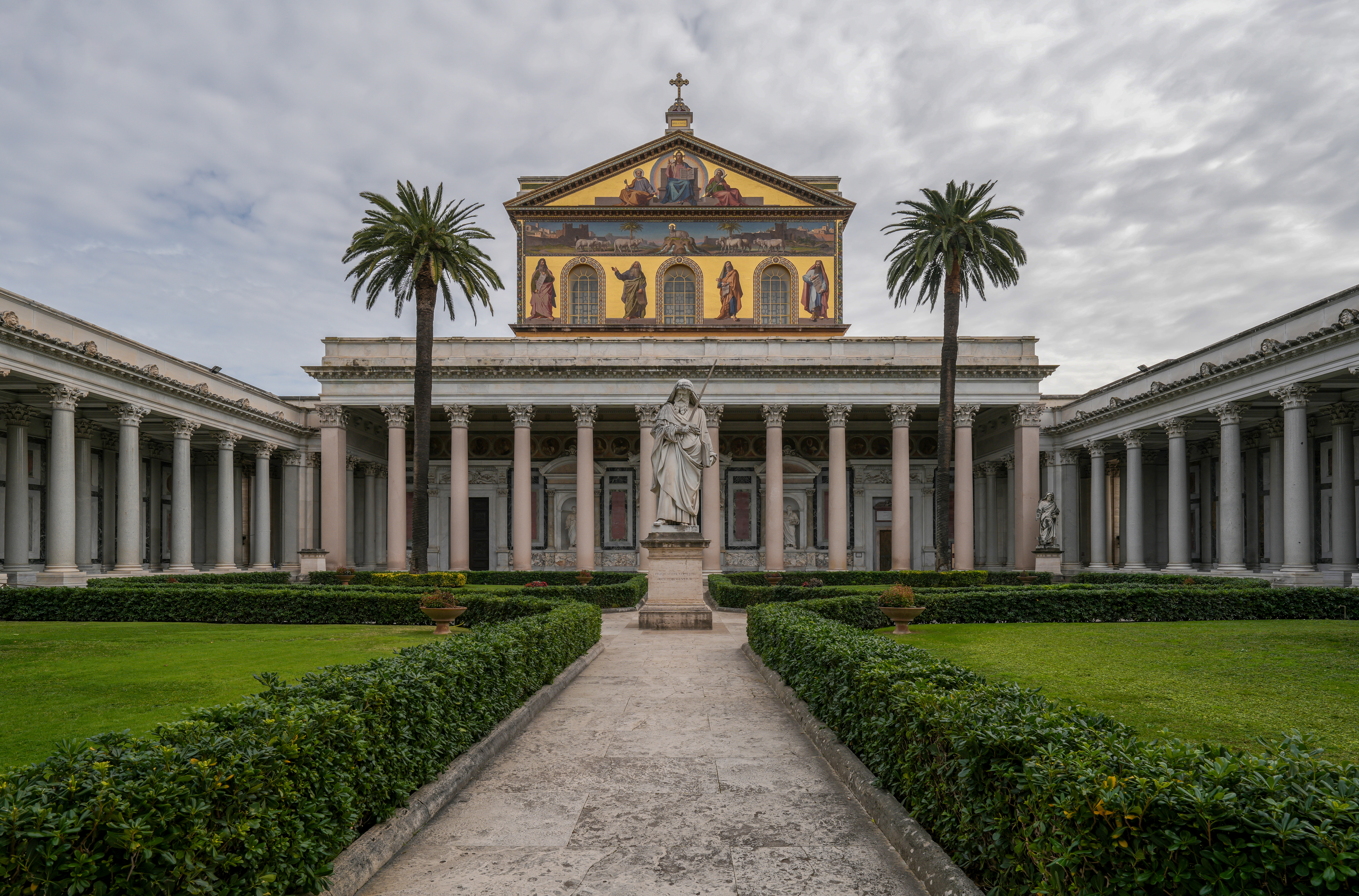
The Basilica of Saint Paul Outside the Walls, which was the Roman seat of the Latin Patriarch of Alexandria

Records of a Latin patriarch of Alexandria begin only in the 14th century. The position was merely titular since the bishop never occupied the See. His patriarchal cathedral in Rome was the papal Basilica of Saint Paul Outside the Walls. Many incumbents would hold residential (arch)episcopal posts of various ranks in Catholic countries, and even (earlier and/or later) other Titular Latin patriarchates (Jerusalem, Constantinople). The titular see would have its share of disputed nominations during the papal schism in Avignon.

Since 1724, the Melkite Catholic Patriarchate of Antioch and All the East holds the title of patriarch of Alexandria. In 1895, the Coptic Catholic Patriarchate of Alexandria was established out of the Catholic Apostolic Vicariate of Alexandria. Thus, there remains a patriarch of Alexandria for the Catholic Church.

=== Suppression ===
The titular Latin Patriarchate of Alexandria was left vacant in 1954 and suppressed in January 1964 along with those of Antioch and Constantinople. It was no longer mentioned in the Vatican yearbook (rather than being announced as being abolished). This was after Pope Paul VI met with Ecumenical Patriarch Athenagoras I of Constantinople, showing the Latin Church by this point was more interested in reconciliation with the Eastern Church, abolishing the titular title.

== Latin patriarchs of Alexandria ==
- Egidio da Ferrara (Giles), Dominican Order (O.P.) (1311.10.15 – 1323), previously Patriarch of Grado (northern Italy, 1296.05.11 – 1311.10.15)
- Oddone Sala (Otho), O.P. (1323.06.26 – death 1325.05.03), also Apostolic Administrator of Territorial Abbacy of Montecassino (Benedictine, central Italy) (1323.06.06 – 1325.05.03); previously Bishop of Terralba (Italy) (1300 – 1302), Bishop of Pula (Croatia) (1302 – 1308), Metropolitan Archbishop of Oristano (Italy) (1308 – 1312.05.10), Metropolitan Archbishop of Pisa (Italy) (1312.05.10 – 1323.06.26)
- Juan (John), Infante (royal prince) of the Crown of Aragon (1328.08.27 – death 1334.08.19); also Apostolic Administrator of Tarragona (Catalonia, Spain) (1328.08.17 – 1334.08.19); previously Metropolitan Archbishop of Toledo (Spain) (1319.11.14 – 1328.08.17)
- Guillaume de Chanac (1342.09.27 – death 1348), previously Bishop of Paris (France) (1332.08.13 – 1342.09.27)
- Humbert II, Dauphin of Vienne, O.P. (1351 – death 1355.05.22), also Apostolic Administrator of Reims (Champagne, northern France) (1352.04.30 – 1355.05.22)
- Arnaud Bernard du Pouget (Arnaldo Bernardi) (1361.06.16 – death 1368.09.22), also Apostolic Administrator of Montauban (France) (1361 – 1368.09.30?); previously Metropolitan Archbishop of Aix (southern France) (1348.08.14 – 1361.06.16); created Cardinal-Priest with no Title assigned (like a modern Cardinal-Patriarch would rank as Cardinal-bishop without titular church on account of his patriarchal see) (1368.09.22 – 1368.09.30?), and nominated Chamberlain of the Holy Roman Church of Reverend Apostolic Camera (1368.09.22 – 1368.09.30?)
- uncanonical Jean de Cardaillac (1371.07.18 – 1390); also canonical Bishop of Rodez (France) (1371.07.18 – 1378), uncanonical Metropolitan Archbishop of Auch (France) (1379.01.24 – 1379.05.20), canonical Auxiliary Bishop of Tournai (Belgium) (1389 – 1390); previously canonical Metropolitan Archbishop of Braga (Portugal) (1361.06.18 – 1371.07.18);
- Pietro Amely di Brunac (1386 – 1400 see below), Augustinian Order O.E.S.A., previously Bishop of Senigallia (Italy) (1375.07.05 – 1382), Metropolitan Archbishop of Taranto (southern Italy) (1386 – 1387.11.12), Patriarch of Grado (northern Italy) (1387.11.12 – 1400)
- ? Johannes Walteri von Sinten (1392–1397), Roman obedience
- uncanonical Simon of Cramaud (1391.03.17 – death 1422.12.15?), previously canonical Bishop of Agen (France) (1382.05.30 – 1383.08.07), Bishop of Béziers (France) (1383.09.02 – 1385.11.24), Bishop of Poitiers (France) (1385.11.24 – 1391.09.19); also canonical Apostolic Administrator of Carcassonne (France) (1391.09.19 – 1409.07.02), Apostolic Administrator of Avignon (France) (1412 – 1415) and Apostolic Administrator of Poitiers (France) (1413.04.14 – 1422.12.15), but also uncanonical Metropolitan Archbishop of Reims (France) (1409.07.02 [1409.12.15] – 1413.04.14) and created Pseudocardinal-Priest of S. Lorenzo in Lucina (1413.05.12 – 1422.12.15)
- Pietro Amely di Brunac, O.E.S.A., again (see above 1400 – 1402?)
- Leonardo Dolfin (1401.07.27 – 1402), previously Bishop of (H)Eraclea (northern Italy; 1382 – 1387.05.07), Metropolitan Archbishop of Crete (island, Greece) (1387.05.07 – 1392.08.31), Bishop of Castello (1392.10.21 – 1401.07.27)
- Ugo Roberti (1402 – 1409), previously Bishop of Adria (Italy) (1386.09.01 – 1392.05.07), Bishop of Padova (Italy) (1392.05.07 – 1396.04.12), Titular Latin Patriarch of Jerusalem (1396.04.12 – 1409)
- Pietro Amaury di Lordat (1409.07.24 – death 1412), also remained Apostolic Administrator of Carcassonne (France) (1409.07.24 – 1412); previously Metropolitan Archbishop of Bourges (France) (1390.10.17 – 1409.07.02), Bishop of Carcassonne (1409.07.02 – 1409.07.24)
- Lancelot of Navarre (1418.09.02 – 1422?)
- Giovanni Contarini (1422.07.17 – 1424.07.14), previously Titular Latin Patriarch of Constantinople (1409.10.23 – 1422.07.17) and Apostolic Administrator of (H)Eraclea (1418.04.18 – 1427); later again Titular Latin Patriarch of Constantinople (1424.07.14 – death 1451)
- Pietro (1424.07.14 – death 1428?)
- Vitalis di Mauléon (1428.11.29 – death 1435), previously Bishop of Rodez (France) (1417.12.31 – 1428.11.29)
- Giovanni Vitelleschi (1435.02.21 – death 1440.04.02), previously Bishop of Macerata (Italy) (1431.04.16 – 1435.10.12), Bishop of Recanati (Italy) (1431.04.16 – 1435.10.12); also Metropolitan Archbishop of Firenze (Florence) (Italy) (1435.10.12 – 1437.08.09), Archbishop-Bishop of Traù (1437.08.09 – death 1440.04.02); created Cardinal-Priest of S. Lorenzo in Lucina (1437.08.09 – 1440.04.02), Archpriest of Papal Basilica of St. Mary Major (1439 – 1440.04.02)
- Marco Condulmer (1444 – death 1451?), previously Bishop of Avignon (France) (1432.01.09 – 1437), Metropolitan Archbishop of Tarentaise (France) (1433.03.17 – 1438.02.28), Patriarch of Grado (Italy) (1438.02.28 – 1444)
- Jean d’Harcourt (1451.12.10 – 1453?), previously Bishop of Amiens (Picardy, France) (1424.05.10 – 1433.04.22), Bishop of Tournai (Belgium) (1433.04.22 – 1436.11.05), Metropolitan Archbishop of Narbonne (France) (1436.11.05 – 1451.12.10)
- Arnaldo Rogerii de Palas (1453.08.24 – death 1461.08.16), previously Prince-Bishop of Urgell (northern Spain; Co-prince of Andorra) (1437.07.19 – 1461.08.16)
- Pedro de Urrea (1462 – ?), while Metropolitan Archbishop of Tarragona (Spain) (1445 – death 1489.09.09)
- Pedro González de Mendoza (1482.11.13 – death 1495.01.11), also Metropolitan Archbishop of Toledo (Spain) (1482.11.13 – 1495.01.11); previously Bishop of Calahorra y La Calzada (Spain) (1453.11.28 – 1467.10.30), Bishop of Sigüenza (Spain) (1467.10.30 – 1474.05.09), created Cardinal-Priest of S. Maria in Domnica pro hac vice Title (1473.05.17 – 1478.07.06), Apostolic Administrator of Sevilla (Spain) (1474.05.09 – 1482.11.13), Apostolic Administrator of Sigüenza (Spain) (1474.05.09 – 1495.01.11), transferred Cardinal-Priest of S. Croce in Gerusalemme (1478.07.06 – 1495.01.11), Apostolic Administrator of Osma (Spain) (1482.07.08 – 1482.11)
- Diego Hurtado de Mendoza (1500.10.05 – death 1502.10.14), also remained Metropolitan Archbishop of Sevilla (Spain) (1485.08.26 – 1502.10.14), created Cardinal-Priest of S. Sabina (1500.10.05 – 1502.10.14); previously Bishop of Palencia (Spain) (1470.02.13 – 1485.08.26)
- Alonso de Fonseca y Acevedo (1502? – retired? 1506?), remaining Metropolitan Archbishop of Santiago de Compostela (Spain) (1464 – retired 1507.08.04; died 1512); previously Apostolic Administrator of Sevilla (Spain) (1460 – 1464)
- Bernardino Carafa (1503 – death 1505.07.30), remaining Bishop of Chieti (Italy) (1501.12.20 – 1505.07.30)
- Cesare Riario (1506.10.06 – death 1540.12.18); also first remaining Apostolic Administrator of Pisa (Italy) (1499.06.03 – 1518.09.03), later Bishop of Málaga (southern Spain) (1518.09.03 – 1540.12.18)
- Guido Ascanio Sforza di Santa Fiora (1541.04.06 – retired 1541.05.20), also Apostolic Administrator of Montefiascone (1534 – 1548.06.04), Apostolic Administrator of Corneto (Italy) (1534 – 1548.06.04), Chamberlain of the Holy Roman Church of Reverend Apostolic Camera (1537.10.22 – death 1564.10.06), Apostolic Administrator of Narni (Italy) (1537.12.05 – 1538.01.11), Apostolic Administrator of Chiusi (Italy) (1538.01.11 – 1538.03.20), Cardinal-Deacon of S. Maria in Cosmedin (1540.05.31 – 1540.12.10), Cardinal-Deacon of S. Eustachio (1540.12.10 – 1552.03.09); previously Cardinal-Deacon of Ss. Vito e Modesto in Macello Martyrum (1534.12.18 – 1540.05.31), Apostolic Administrator of Parma (Italy) (1535.08.13 – 1560.04.26); later Apostolic Administrator of Anglona (1542.11.24 – 1542.12.20), Apostolic Administrator of Lescar (France) (1546 – 1547), Apostolic Administrator of above Montefiascone (1550 – 1551 and 1553 – 1555), Apostolic Administrator of above Corneto (Italy) (1550 – 1551 and 1553 – 1555), Cardinal-Deacon of S. Maria in Via Lata (1552.03.09 – 1564.10.06), becoming Protodeacon of Sacred College of Cardinals (1552.03.09 – death 1564.10.06)
- Ottaviano Maria Sforza (1541.05.20 – death 1545), also Bishop of Terracina, Priverno e Sezze (Italy) (1540.11.24 – death 1545); previously Bishop of Lodi (Italy) (1497.10.27 – 1499, 1512 – 1519 and 1527 – 1533), Bishop of Arezzo (Italy) (1522 – 1527)
- Julius Gonzaga (1550.05.23 – death 1550.09)
- Cristoforo Guidalotti Ciocchi del Monte (1550.10.20 – 1551.11.20), also Bishop of Marseille (France) (1550.06.27 – 1556.03.09); previously Titular Bishop of Bethlehem (1517.08.21 – 1525.02.10), Bishop of Cagli (Italy) (1525.02.10 – 1550.06.27); later created Cardinal-Priest of S. Prassede (1551.12.04 – 1564.10.27), again Bishop of Cagli (1556.03.09 – 1564.10.27)
- Jacques Cortès (1552.01.08 – death 1568), remaining Bishop of Vaison (1536.05.15 – 1568)
- Tommaso (1568 – death 1570)
- Alessandro Riario (1570.11.08 – death 1585.07.18), also created Cardinal-Priest of S. Maria in Ara Coeli (1578.03.03 – 1585.07.18)
- Enrico Caetani (1585.07.29 – retired 1585.12.18), also created Cardinal-Priest of S. Pudenziana (1586.01.15 – death 1599.12.13), Chamberlain of the Holy Roman Church of Reverend Apostolic Camera (1587.10.26 – death 1599.12.13)
- Giovanni Battista Albani (Albano) (1586.03.24 – death 1588?)
- Camillo Caetani (1588.08.22 –retired 1599.12.13), also Apostolic Nuncio (papal ambassador) to Austria-Hungary (1591 – 1592)
- Séraphin Olivier-Razali (1602.08.26 – retired 1604.06.09), also created Cardinal-Priest of S. Salvatore in Lauro (1604.06.25 – 1609.02.10)
- Alessandro di Sangro (1604.08.02 – death 1633.02.18), also Metropolitan Archbishop of Benevento (Italy) (1616.05.02 – 1633.02.18)
- Honoratus Caetani (1633.04.11 – death 1647.08)
- Federico Borromeo (iuniore) (1654.10.19 – retired 1670.12.22), also Apostolic Nuncio to Switzerland (1654.11.28 – 1665.08.20), Apostolic Nuncio to Spain (1668.02.25 – 1670.07), Papal Secretary of State of Apostolic Secretariat (1670 – 1673), created Cardinal-Priest of Sant'Agostino (1671.02.23 – 1672.08.08), Cardinal-Priest of S. Agnese fuori le mura (1672.08.08 – death 1673.02.18)
- Allesandro Crescenzi, Somascans (C.S.R.) (1671.01.19 – retired 1675.05.27), remaining Bishop of Bitonto (Italy) (1652.08.26 – 1668.05.14); previously Bishop of Termoli (Italy) (1643.07.13 – 1644.06.13), Bishop of Ortona (Italy) (1644.06.13 – 1652.08.26); later Cardinal-Priest of S. Prisca (1675.07.15 – 1688.05.08), Archbishop-Bishop of Loreto (Italy) (1676.02.24 – retired 1682.01.09), Archbishop-Bishop of Recanati (Italy) (1676.02.24 – 1682.01.09), Patriarch ad personam (1676.02.24 – 1682.01.09), Camerlengo of Sacred College of Cardinals (1685.04.09 – retired 1687.03.03), died 1688
- Aloysius Bevilacqua (1675.09.30 – death 1680.04.21)
- Pietro Draghi Bartoli (1690.11.13 – death 1710.08.12)
- Gregorio Giuseppe Gaetani de Aragonia (1695.05.02 – death 1710.08.12), previously Titular Archbishop of Neocæsarea (1676.02.24 – 1695.05.02)
- Carlo Ambrosio Mezzabarba (1719.09.18 – 1741.12.07), also Bishop of Lodi (Italy) (1725.07.18 – 1741.12.07)
- Filippo Carlo Spada (1742.01.22 – death 1742.12.08), previously Bishop of Pesaro (Romagna, Italy) (1702.11.20 – 1738.12.19), Titular Archbishop of Theodosia (1738.12.19 – 1742.01.22)
- Girolamo Crispi (1742.12.17 – death 1746.07.24), also Archbishop of Ferrara (Italy) (1745.12.16 – 1746.07.24); previously Metropolitan Archbishop of Ravenna (Italy) (1720.12.16 – 1727.03.13)
- Giuseppe Antonio Davanzati (1746.08.06 – death 1755.02.16), remaining Metropolitan Archbishop of Trani (southern Italy) (1717.11.22 – 1755.02.16)
- Lodovico Agnello Anastasi (1755.05.12 – death 1758.02.19), remaining Metropolitan Archbishop of Sorrento (Italy) (1724.12.20 – 1758.02.19)
- Francisco Mattei (1758.03.13 – death 1794.08.15), previously Titular Archbishop of Corinthus (1757.03.28 – 1758.03.13)
- ?vacancy
- Augustus Foscolo (1847.10.04 – death 1860.06.07); previously Bishop of Corfù (Greek island) (1816.03.08 – 1830.03.15), Latin Titular Patriarch of Jerusalem (1830.03.15 – 1847.10.04).
- ?vacancy
- Paolo Angelo Ballerini (1867.03.27 – death 1897.03.27), remaining Metropolitan Archbishop of Milan (1859.06.20 – 1867.03.27)
- Domenico Marinangeli (1898.01.08 – 1921.03.06), previously Bishop of Foggia (Italy) (1882.03.27 – 1893.01.16), Metropolitan Archbishop of Trani e Barletta (Italy) and Titular Archbishop of Nazareth (1893.01.16 – 1898.01.08)
- Paolo de Huyn (1921.06.13 – death 1946.10.01), previously Bishop of Brno (1904.05.14 – 1916.10.04), Metropolitan Archbishop of Praha (Prague) (1916.10.04 – 1919.09.06), Titular Archbishop of Sardica (1919.09.06 – 1921.06.13)
- vacancy (1946–1950)
- Luca Ermenegildo Pasetto, Capuchin Franciscans (O.F.M. Cap.) (1950.11.11 – death 1954.01.22), previously Titular Bishop of Geras (1921.11.21 – 1937.09.22), Secretary of Sacred Congregation of Religious (1935 – 1950.11.11), Titular Archbishop of Iconium (1937.09.22 – 1950.11.11)
- Vacancy from 1954 until the Latin titular patriarchate was officially suppressed in 1964.

== Sources and external links ==
- GCatholic.org List of Latin Patriarchs of Alexandria
