= Alberto Bolognetti =

Italian academic, bishop, and diplomat (1538–1585)

Alberto Bolognetti (1538–1585) was an Italian law professor, bishop, diplomat, and cardinal. He was appointed by Pope Gregory XIII as a papal nuncio to Florence, Venice, and the Polish–Lithuanian Commonwealth. In that last appointment, he persuaded King Stephen Báthory to adopt the Gregorian calendar. He was promoted to cardinal priest, but died before he could return to Rome for the ceremonies.

== Origins and legal career ==
Alberto Bolognetti was born in Bologna on 8 July 1538, the son of Francesco Bolognetti, Senator of Bologna and a noted poet, and Lucrezia Fantuzzi. He had brothers named Francesco, Alessandro, and Marcantonio (who became a Jesuit). He was educated at the University of Bologna, a student of Gabriele Paleotto, receiving a doctorate in law on 23 May 1562. His father, who was then Gonfaloniere di Giustizia, was present at his inception.

After completing his education, he became a cleric in Bologna. He was a professor of civil law at the studium of Bologna from 27 June 1562 to 1564, with s salary of 200 lire; and then for nine years at Salerno from 1565 to 1574, where his salary was 500 scudi.

== Nuncio in Florence ==
In 1574, Pope Gregory XIII, a fellow citizen of Bologna, called him to Rome and named him a protonotary apostolic and Referendary of the Two Signatures. He was then sent as nuncio to the Grand Duke Francesco (1574–1587) in Florence from 25 February 1576 to 10 September 1578. The Grand Duke's brother Ferdinando was a cardinal himself, created by Pius IV in 1563. In 1577, Bolognetti presided at the baptism of Ferdinand's son Filippo Cosimo.

== Nuncio in Venice ==
Then he served as Nuncio in the Republic of Venice from 10 September 1578 to 12 April 1581. While on duty in Venice, on 27 April 1579 Msgr. Bolognetti was appointed Bishop of Massa Marittima by Pope Gregory XIII. This gave him additional stature for a task that Gregory XIII wanted carried out in Venice. Bolognetti had been ordered by the pope to carry out systematic visitations of various religious houses in his jurisdiction. As he attempted to begin to do so in 1580, he was met by strong reactions from Doge Nicolò da Ponte and from the Venetian Senate, who complained to the pope, who was forced to relent. In his report to the Pope at the conclusion of his Nunciature, Bolognetti gave particular attention to the Inquisition in Venice, which, in his view, was concentrating mostly on people using incantations and Jews who were only nominally converting to Catholicism—in other words, policing undesirables rather than combatting heresy. He further noted, "The Venetians make extensive use of discretion, for they are bound by no laws but their own, which are very general, and, compared with others, few in number." A doctor in law from Bologna would find such an attitude intolerable.

Bolognetti's departure from Venice, at the end of March 1581, was apparently quite sudden. In a report from Cobham to the Secretaries of Queen Elizabeth of England, dated 20 April 1581, it is noted:

Monsr. Bolognetto, who was lately nuncio at Venice, has arrived at Rome suddenly; whereon many comments are made, but nothing is certainly known.

The Pope has lately sent to the Signiory of Venice to have certain of his ministers visit the schools and other places, for enquiry and reformation in matters of religion. The Signiory have granted that the same may extend to monasteries and no otherwise; whereon it is suspected there will grow some little unkindness that way. The Bishop of Verona is constituted by the Signiory visitor of those monasteries, being a Venetian gentlemen.

...The matter between the Venetians and the Pope, about the Inquisition, is appeased, and the Pope sends Monsr Campejo to reside as Nuncio at Venice.

== Nuncio in Poland ==
Bolognetti was immediately appointed Papal Nuncio for Gregory XIII to King Stephen Báthory in the Polish–Lithuanian Commonwealth. He served from 12 April 1581 to April 1585, under the most frustrating circumstances. The decrees of the Council of Trent were not yet being applied systematically in his assigned territory; they had only been accepted officially in 1577. Indeed, the Hierarchy was in disarray, to say nothing of the lower clergy. Presentation to church positions at all levels, were under the control of the local magnates or the King. Selection had more to do with loyalty than with orthodox religious views or with a religious vocation. Numbers of both high and low clergy had gone over to Protestantism, some even to atheism, and unworthy persons had been appointed to church offices at all levels. During his entire stay in Poland, Bolognetti emphasized to the King the necessity of appointing only Catholics to office—but with limited success. Only Stanislas Hosius (Hozjusz) was already fighting enthusiastically and doggedly for the Catholic faith and the teachings of the Council of Trent. King Stefan I Bathory and Grand Duke Michael of Moscow, however, had reached an agreement to subject the church in Lithuania to obedience to the Roman Church, and Bolognetti was sent to put the agreement into practice. This was an opportunity and a great challenge. A report of his four years of activities was prepared after his death by his secretary, Orazio Spannocchi, for the use of Cardinal Rusticucci, the Secretary of State of Sixtus V. The greatest problems for religion in Poland apparently were the advance of Protestantism and the spread of Indifferentism. Bolognetti prevailed upon King Stephen Bathory to found the first house of the Jesuits at Cracow. He was following the lead of his most energetic supporter and friend, Cardinal Stanislaus Hosius, who had brought some Jesuits to his diocese of Warmia on his return from Italy in 1563, and had persuaded the Bishop of Wilno to give the Jesuits a church in his diocese. The Jesuits were the leading proponents of the decrees of the Council of Trent. They opened a college in Wilno (Vilnius), which was granted the same privileges and rights as the University of Cracow by King Stephen and by Pope Gregory XIII (29 October 1579). In 1582, Bolognetti also persuaded King Stephen to apply the Bull of Gregory XIII which instituted the Gregorian Calendar in October 1582. This act had repercussions between the Churches which were in union with Rome (now called Eastern Catholic Churches) and those which followed the Eastern Orthodox Church tradition, such as the Russian Orthodox Church; the calendar difference persists, one of many.

In 1583, Rome had been made aware that Spanish agents were active in Poland, buying grain and other commodities apparently, for provisioning their armies in the Netherlands and in Spain. Cardinal Tolomei Galli, the Secretary of State, wrote to Nuncio Bolognetti, with a series of twelve questions for Bolognetti to gather information about. Bolognetti, already well-informed on the matters, replied quickly, on 11 June, with detailed information about the navigability of the Vistula, what lands it gave access to and what was the fertility of the land and its products, the circulation and value of money, Polish naval capacities and trade with Flanders, the port of Danzig (where the English heretics had considerable influence), etc.

Pope Gregory XIII made Bolognetti a cardinal priest in the consistory of 12 December 1583. However, he never received the red hat or a titular church since he died before he could come to Rome for the ceremonies. But his title in Poland was changed to Apostolic Legate from Nuncio. In its pride at Cardinal Alberto's elevation, the Senate of Bologna granted him an annual pension of 500 gold scudi.

== Death ==
Cardinal Bolognetti died of a fever in Villach in Carinthia on 9 May 1585 (according to Gaspare di Caro and Biaudet), or 17 May 1585 (according to Eubel and Cristofori), or 23 May 1585 (according to Ludwig von Pastor), having caught a fever while returning from Poland to participate in the papal conclave of 1585. He was only forty-seven years old. His remains were returned to Bologna and buried in Santa Maria dei Servi.

He was the author of two books: (1) De lege, iure, et aequitate Disputationes (Roma 1570) [97 folia]; and (2) Ad rub. Dig. de verborum obligationibus commentaria (Rome 1570) [130 folia]. A considerable number of his letters survive in various archives. His report on his Venice nunciature is published by Stella.

== Bibliography ==
- Orazio Spannocchi, Horatii Spannocchii Relazione delle cose di Polonia intorno alla religione 1586 (ed. Joseph Korzeniowski) (Cracoviae: sumptibus Academiae Litterarum 1894).
- Giovanni Fantuzzi, "Bolognetti, Alberto", Notizie degli scrittori bolognesi Tomo secondo (Bologna 1782), pp. 236–241. "Bolognetti Alessandro", 241.
- Lorenzo Cardella, Memorie storiche de' cardinali della Santa Romana Chiesa Tomo quinto (Roma: Pagliarini 1793), pp. 211–213.
- Augustinus Theiner, Annales Ecclesiastici Tomus Tertius (Roma 1856). [years 1579–1585] (especially documents on pp. 757–781, 784-787, and 819–826, including reports of Bolognetti).
- F. Calori Cesis, Il cardinale Alberto Bolognetto. La sua nunziatura di Polonia (Modena 1861).
- Joseph Korzeniowski, Analecta Romana quae historiam Poloniae saec.XVI illustrant (Cracow 1894).
- Ludwig Pastor, The History of the Popes: From the Close of the Middle Ages Vol. 20 (1930) [Reprint. London: Forgotten Books, 2013], pp. 406–411.
- Gaspare di Caro, "Bolognetti, Alberto," Dizionario biografico degli Italiani. Volume 11 (1969)
- Aldo Stella, Chiesa e Stato nelle relazioni dei nunzi pontifici a Venezia: ricerche sul giurisdizionalismo veneziano dal XVI al XVIII secolo (Vatican: Biblioteca apostolica vaticana 1964), pp. 105–318.
