= Giovanni Ottavio Manciforte Sperelli =

Italian Roman Catholic bishop and cardinal

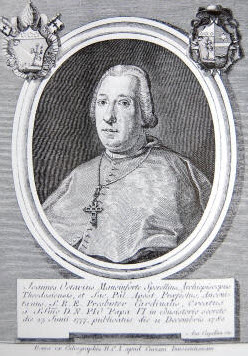
Giovanni Ottavio Manciforte Sperelli

Giovanni Ottavio Manciforte Sperelli (1730–1781) was an Italian Roman Catholic bishop and cardinal.

== Biography ==
Giovanni Ottavio Manciforte Sperelli was born in Assisi on 23 February 1730, the son of Marquis Marcantonio Manciforte, governor of the army of the March of Ancona, and Flavia Sperelli.

He was educated at the Collegio Campana at Osimo and then at the Sapienza University of Rome, from which he received a doctorate of both laws on 26 November 1754. Pope Benedict XIV, who had known Manciforte Sperelli's family since the time he was Bishop of Ancona, appointed him a canon of St. Peter's Basilica on 25 March 1751, a post he held until 1766.

After graduating from university, he was made a Referendary of the Apostolic Signatura on 19 December 1754. On 7 September 1755, he was ordained as a priest. He was Relator of the Sacred Congregation of Good Government from 1755 to 1766. From 1766 to 1771, he was inquisitor and apostolic visitor to Malta, where he attempted unsuccessfully to defend the Jesuits, who had been suppressed by Manuel Pinto da Fonseca, Grand Master of the Order of Malta.

On 17 June 1771, he was elected titular archbishop of Teodosia. He was consecrated as a bishop by Cardinal Henry Benedict Stuart on 23 June 1777. He served as nuncio at Florence from 27 June 1771 until December 1775. He was appointed to the Apostolic Camera in September 1775 and he took possession of this office on 4 January 1776. On 24 May 1776, he became papal majordomo and prefect of the Apostolic Palace. In January 1777, he became commendatory abbot of the monastery of S. Croce di Montesanto in Fermo.

At the consistory of 23 June 1777, Pope Pius VI made Manciforte Sperelli a cardinal in pectore. His elevation was published in the consistory of 11 December 1780. He received the red hat on 14 December 1780, and was awarded the titular church of Santa Maria in Trastevere on 2 April 1781. He served on the Sacred Congregations of f Bishops and Regulars, Council, Fabric of Saint Peter, Avignon and Loreto.

He died in Rome on 5 June 1781. He is buried in Santa Maria in Trastevere.
