= Opisto Pallavicini =

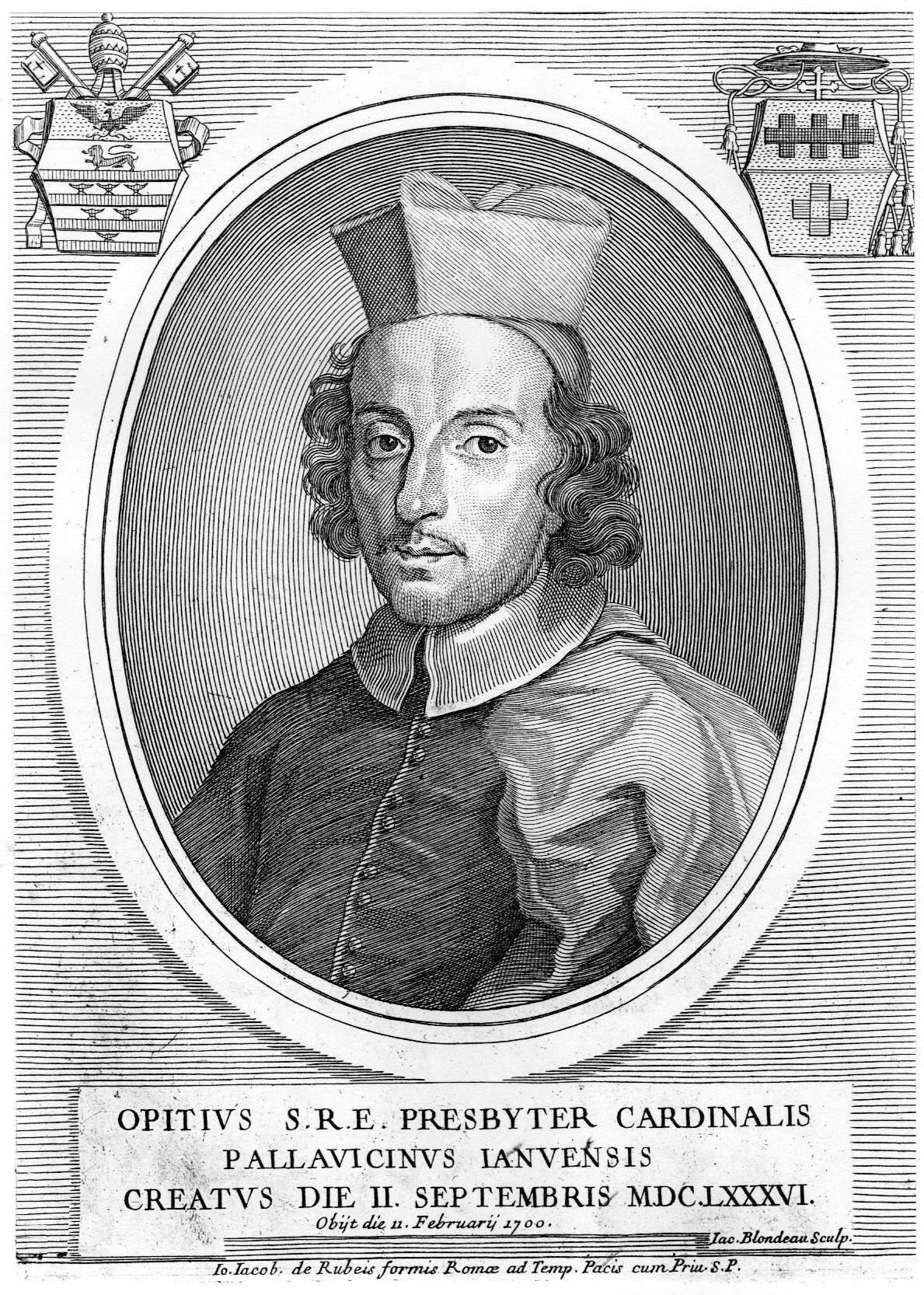
Opizio Pallavicini.

Opisto Pallavicini, sometimes also known as Opio Pallavicino, was born on 15 October 1632 in Genoa by noble family. He was a bishop of the Roman Catholic Church.

Having obtained the PhD in utroque iure and received the priestly ordination, during the pontificate of Pope Innocent X (1644-1655), he moved to Rome where he held the post of referendary of the Supreme Court of the Apostolic Signature of Grace and Justice.

Elected archbishop of Ephesus on 27 February 1668, apostolic nuncio in Tuscany since 1 June 1668; Nuncio to Cologne since 29 November 1672; as Nuncio in Poland, from 30 September 1680 he spoke in favor of the fight against the Turks.

Elevated to Cardinal Priest in the Consistory of 2 September 1686 by Pope Innocent XI; Pontifical Legate in Urbino from 12 July 1688 until 1690, then on 14 November 1689 he received the title of Saints Silvestro and Martino at the Monti. He participated in the conclave of 1689 and subsequently, on 28 November 1689, he was transferred to the headquarters of Spoleto as archbishop in personal capacity. From 8 August 1691, he was in Osimo, always as Archbishop of his own, in the same year he also participated in the conclave that saw the election of Pope Innocent XII.

He died in Rome on 11 September 1700 at the Buratti palace, where he resided.

It is buried in the vestibule of the undergrounds of the church of San Martino ai Monti.
