= Lorenzo Priuli (cardinal) =

Venetian aristocrat, cardinal and ambassador

His Eminence Lorenzo Priuli
- Cardinal, Patriarch of Venice
- Church: Catholic Church
- See: Patriarch of Venice
- Appointed: 7 January 1591
- Term ended: 26 January 1600
- Predecessor: Giovanni Trevisan
- Successor: Matteo Zane
- Other post: Cardinal-Priest of Santa Maria in Traspontina (1596–1600)

Orders
- Ordination: 1590 (Priest)
- Consecration: 27 January 1591 (Bishop) by Marcello Acquaviva
- Created cardinal: 5 June 1596 by Pope Clement VIII
- Rank: Cardinal-Priest

Personal details
- Born: 9 August 1538 Venice, Republic of Venice
- Died: 26 January 1600 (aged 61) Venice, Republic of Venice
- Buried: San Pietro di Castello, Venice

Lorenzo Priuli (9 August 1538 – 26 January 1600) was Venetian aristocrat and ambassador in France and at Rome. He was Patriarch of Venice from 1591 to his death, and a Cardinal from 1596.

In the last centuries of the Republic of Venice (to 1797), exceptionally among Catholic bishops, the patriarch was elected by the Venetian Senate, who always chose a member of one of the hereditary patrician families of the city, and usually a layman who was only ordained to take up the patriarchate. The papacy obliged them to pass an examination in theology, though many evaded this. Usually the new patriarch was a Venetian diplomat or administrator, as with Lorenzo Priuli in 1591 or Francesco Vendramin in 1608, though some were career clerics, who had usually been previously in positions in Rome, like Federico Cornaro in 1631.

== Biography ==
Lorenzo Priuli was born on 9 August 1538 in Venice, eldest son of Giovanni di Zaccaria Priuli (of the di San Polo al magazen branch) and Laura di Alvise Donà. His brothers were Alvise (1539-1609, procurator of San Marco), Zaccaria (1543-1607) and Chiara (wife of Alberto Badoer).

He had a classical education and at the same time oriented towards a political career, so that already in 1562 he was elected among the Elders of the Orders of the Republic of Venice (a deliberative but powerless body, responsible for instructing the young nobility in government), subsequently entering the College of the Wise Men on the Orders (the body charged with supervision of maritime matters and the Republic's oversees colonies). He was special ambassador to Venice for the marriage of Francesco, son of Grand Duke Cosimo I de' Medici, to Giovanna, daughter of Emperor Ferdinand I in 1566. Ambassador to Spain from 27 November 1572, he was ambassador to France from 1579 to 1582 and then moved to the embassy to the Holy See from 11 June 1583 to 1586. Councilor for the Santa Croce district in 1586, he became Superintendent of the Mint in 1587. In 1588 he resolved the dispute for the construction of the Rialto Bridge and in 1590 he was elected mayor of Brescia.

On 4 August 1590 he was elected by the Senate of Venice to the role of Patriarch of Venice with 122 in favor and 79 against. To became Patriarch, he first had to obtain a permit for not having yet received holy orders and then a second permit for not having yet obtained any doctorate. On the morning of 27 January 1591, he was consecrated bishop in the venetian church of Sant'Elena by the Nuncio, Marcello Acquaviva, Archbishop of Otranto, and on the same day he was formally installed as Patriarch.

In 1591 he laid the first stone for the foundation of the church of San Nicola da Tolentino with a solemn ceremony. During the years of his regency of the patriarchate, he reformed the clergy and prepared the preparation of the clergy themselves. With a brief dated 25 April 1592, Pope Clement VIII urged Patriarch Priuli to visit all the churches of the regulars present in his diocese. From 9 to 11 September 1592 he celebrated a metropolitan synod for the reform of the clergy, issuing decrees regarding the use of images in churches, according to the directives of the Council of Trent. He celebrated another synod from 15 to 17 November 1594 for the establishment of new seminaries, having the cathedral of San Pietro di Castello restored in that same year. At the same time he assigned the architect Francesco Smeraldi the construction of its facade of that basilica.

Created cardinal priest in the consistory of 5 June 1596, on 30 June of that same year he obtained the cardinal's hat at the hands of Ascanio Colonna, at the time private chaplain of His Holiness. Pietro Colombo gave a congratulatory oration on that occasion and Arcangelo Rizzi composed several poems on the theme. On 2 December 1596 it obtained the title of Santa Maria in Traspontina.

He died on 26 January 1600 in Venice. His funeral was celebrated with great pomp and the participation of all the citizens. He was buried in the cathedral of San Pietro di Castello, next to the altar of San Giovanni Evangelista. By his will, his nephew, Marco Priuli, erected a funeral eulogy dedicated to him next to the altar of the chapel. His body was exhumed in 1624 and found incorrupt.
