= Giovanni Tiepolo =

Italian bishop and Patriarch of Venice (1570–1631)

- Patriarch of Venice
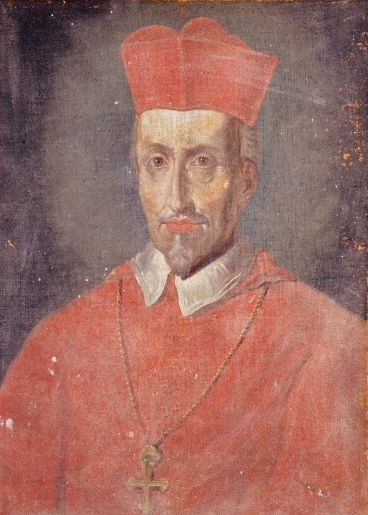
- Church: Catholic Church
- Appointed: 20 November 1619
- Term ended: 7 May 1631
- Predecessor: Francesco Vendramin
- Successor: Federico Baldissera Cornaro

Orders
- Consecration: 8 December 1619 (Bishop) by Sigismondo Donati

Personal details
- Born: 12 April 1570 Venice, Republic of Venice
- Died: 7 May 1631 (aged 61) Venice, Republic of Venice
- Buried: San Pietro di Castello, Venice

Giovanni Tiepolo (Latin: Ioannes Thiepolus; 12 April 1570 – 7 May 1631) was Patriarch of Venice from 1619 to his death.

== Life ==
He was born in Venice on 12 April 1570 to the patrician Agostino di Nicolò e da Laura Bragadin di Giovanni.

As soon as he was of age, he attempted to pursue a political career as was usual in noble Venetian families, but without success. Instead, he followed his religious calling joining the clergy. Probably with the support of Doge Leonardo Donà, on 27 December 1603 he was appointed primicerius of St Mark's Basilica (i.e. the main chaplain of the Doge's Palace). During the Venetian Interdict of 1606 and 1607, a hard crisis between the Papacy and the Republic of Venice, Tiepolo strongly supported the Republic.

On 10 October 1619, after the patriarch of Venice Francesco Vendramin died, the Venetian Senate elected Tiepolo as his successor. The choice was validated by Pope Paul V on 20 November. Giovanni Tiepolo was consecrated bishop in Venice on 8 November by the Nuncio in Venice, Sigismondo Donati. One of the first act of Tiepolo as Patriarch was the condemnation of the forced monastic vows of young girls. He also compiled as critic catalogue of Venetian saints and blessed and made their images to be painted in the church of the Madonna dell'Orto. In April 1622 he visited Rome.

During the 1629–1631 Italian plague he organized devotional events, such as penitential processions and Eucharistic adoration. However for Holy Week of 1631, he forbade public events and he forced the regular clergy to assist the plague-ridden. On 1 April 1631, he blessed the first stone of the new church named Santa Maria della Salute which was to be built to ask God to end the plague, notwithstanding that this church was to be built on the ground where the patriarchal seminary was located.

He died of plague in Venice on 7 May 1631 after 13 days of illness, and he was buried in the cathedral of San Pietro di Castello in Venice.

== Works ==
Giovanni Tiepolo was an author of many religious books, such as:

- Vita del b. Giacomo Salomone nobile venetiano religioso dell'Ordine di S. Domenico e protettore della città di Forlì, Venezia 1691
- Considerationi sopra la Passione di N.S. Giesu Christo, nelle quali si mostra il modo cosi di meditarla, come di imitarla, Venezia 1610
- Il riabbellimento dell'anima dalle nuoue macchie contratte doppo il battesimo, Venezia 1612
- Trattato della tribulatione, Venezia 1612
- Trattato dell'inuocatione, et veneratione de santi, Venezia 1613
- Breue compendio dell'arti christiane, nel quale si contengono li piu importanti essercitij spirituali, Venice 1615
- Trattato delle santissime reliquie, vltimamente ritrouate nel santuario della chiesa di San Marco, Venezia 1617
- Discorsi, et considerationi sopra il santissimo sacramento dell'altare, Venezia 1618
- Trattato dell'imagine della gloriosa Vergine dipinta da San Luca. Conseruata già molti secoli nella ducal Chiesa di San Marco della città di Venetia, Venezia 1618
- Breue trascorso sopra il misterio dell'aspettatione del parto di Maria Vergine, Roma 1622
- Dell'ira di Dio, e de' flagelli e calamita' che per essa vengono al mondo, Venezia 1632

Giovanni Tiepolo is also known as amanuensis of ancient manuscripts, and among them a Chronicle of Venice covering the years from 421 to 1538.
