= Cardinal of Venice =

The Cardinal of Venice may refer to:

- Francesco Condulmer (1390–1453), Catholic cardinal and nephew of Pope Eugene IV
- Pietro Foscari (died 1485), Catholic cardinal
- Maffeo Gherardi (1406–1492), Patriarch of Venice and Catholic cardinal

== See also ==
- Patriarch of Venice
