= Domenico Agostini =

Italian Roman Catholic cardinal (1825–1891)

His Eminence Domenico Agostini
- Cardinal, Patriarch of Venice
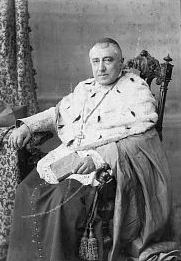
- See: Venice
- Installed: 22 June 1877
- Term ended: 31 December 1891
- Predecessor: Giuseppe Luigi Trevisanato
- Successor: Giuseppe Melchiorre Sarto
- Other post: Cardinal-Priest of Santa Maria della Pace
- Previous posts: Bishop of Chioggia (1871-1877); Cardinal-Priest of Sant'Eusebio (1882-1886)

Orders
- Ordination: 26 January 1851 by Giacomo Monico
- Consecration: 17 December 1871 by Giuseppe Luigi Trevisanato
- Created cardinal: 27 March 1882 by Leo XII
- Rank: Cardinal-Priest

Personal details
- Born: 31 May 1825 near Treviso, Kingdom of Lombardy-Venetia
- Died: 31 December 1891 (aged 66) Venice, Kingdom of Italy
- Buried: San Michele Cemetery
- Denomination: Roman Catholic Church

Domenico Agostini (31 May 1825 — 31 December 1891) was an Italian cardinal and Patriarch of Venice.

== Biography ==
Born near Treviso, he studied in the local seminary, then in the University of Padua. He took a doctorate of philosophy and law, but he left the clerical state to join the citizen militia during the war with Austria in the period 1848–1850. He received the minor orders in 1850, after rejoining the clerical state.

He was ordained priest on 26 January 1851 in Venice and incardinated in the diocese of Treviso. Elected bishop of Chioggia on 27 October 1871. Then, he was promoted to the patriarchal see of Venice on 22 June 1877.

Agostini was created cardinal priest in the consistory of 27 March 1882 by Pope Leo XIII with the title of Sant'Eusebio. He opted for title of Santa Maria della Pace on 7 June 1886.

Cardinal Agostini died on New Year's Eve, 1891 and was interred at the San Michele cemetery on the Isola di San Michele in Venice.
