= Fabio Biondi da Montalto =

Most Reverend Fabio Blondus de Montealto
- Patriarch of Jerusalem
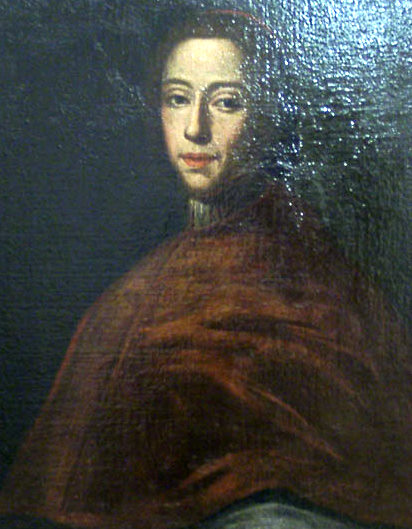
- Church: Catholic Church
- Archdiocese: Latin Patriarchate of Jerusalem
- In office: 1588–1618
- Predecessor: Scipione Gonzaga
- Successor: Francesco Cennini de' Salamandri

Orders
- Consecration: 17 January 1588 by Scipione Gonzaga

Personal details
- Died: 6 December 1618

Fabio Biondi da Montalto or Fabius Blondus de Montealto (died 6 December 1618) was a Roman Catholic prelate who served as Patriarch of Jerusalem (1588–1618).

== Biography ==
On 8 January 1588, Montealto was appointed by Pope Sixtus V as Patriarch of Jerusalem. On 17 January 1588, he was consecrated bishop by Scipione Gonzaga, Cardinal-Priest of Santa Maria del Popolo with Giovanni Battista Albani, Patriarch of Alexandria, and Girolamo Bevilacqua, Archbishop of Nazareth, serving as co-consecrators. He served as Patriarch of Jerusalem until his death on 6 December 1618.

== Episcopal succession ==
Episcopal succession of Fabio Blondus de Montealto

While bishop, he was the principal consecrator of:

- Alexeu de Jesu de Meneses, Archbishop of Goa (1595);
- Miguel Rangel, Bishop of Angola e Congo (1596);
- Maffeo Barberini, Archbishop of Nazareth (1604);
- Giacomo Candido (bishop), Bishop of Lacedonia (1606);
- Michelangelo Tonti, Archbishop of Nazareth (1608);
- Giovanni Francesco Leoni, Bishop of Telese o Cerreto Sannita (1608);

and the principal co-consecrator of:

- Owen Lewis (bishop), Bishop of Cassano all’Jonio (1588);
- Vincenzo Serafino, Bishop of Teano (1588);
- Antonio Maria Graziani, Bishop of Amelia (1592);
- Bonaventura Secusio, Latin Patriarch of Constantinople (1599);
- Juan Esteban Ferrero, Bishop of Vercelli (1599);
- Matteo Zane, Patriarch of Venice (1601);
- Alessandro di Sangro, Latin Patriarch of Alexandria (1604);
- Alfonso Manrique, Archbishop of Burgos (1604);
- Leone Fedeli, Bishop of Lavello (1605);
- Angelo Rocca, Titular bishop of Thagaste (1605);
- Cornelio Sozomeno, Bishop of Pula (1605);
- Denis Delfino, Bishop of Vicenza (1606);
- Ottavio Saraceni, Bishop of Sovana (1606);
- Francesco Vendramin, Patriarch of Venice (1608);
- Tiberio Muti, Bishop of Viterbo e Tuscania (1612);
- Alessandro Ludovisi, Archbishop of Bologna (1612);
- Porfirio Feliciani, Bishop of Foligno (1612);
- Pier Paolo Crescenzi, Bishop of Rieti (1612); and
- Francesco Sacrati, Archbishop of Damascus (1612).

== External links and additional sources ==
- Cheney, David M. "Patriarchate of Jerusalem {Gerusalemme}". Catholic-Hierarchy.org. (for Chronology of Bishops) ^{[self-published]}
- Chow, Gabriel. "Patriarchal See of Jerusalem (Israel)". GCatholic.org. (for Chronology of Bishops) ^{[self-published]}

Catholic Church titles
Preceded by Scipione Gonzaga	Patriarch of Jerusalem; 1588–1618	Succeeded by Francesco Cennini de' Salamandri
