= Alvise Sagredo =

Italian bishop and Patriarch of Venice (1678–1688)

His Beatitude Alvise Sagredo
- Patriarch of Venice
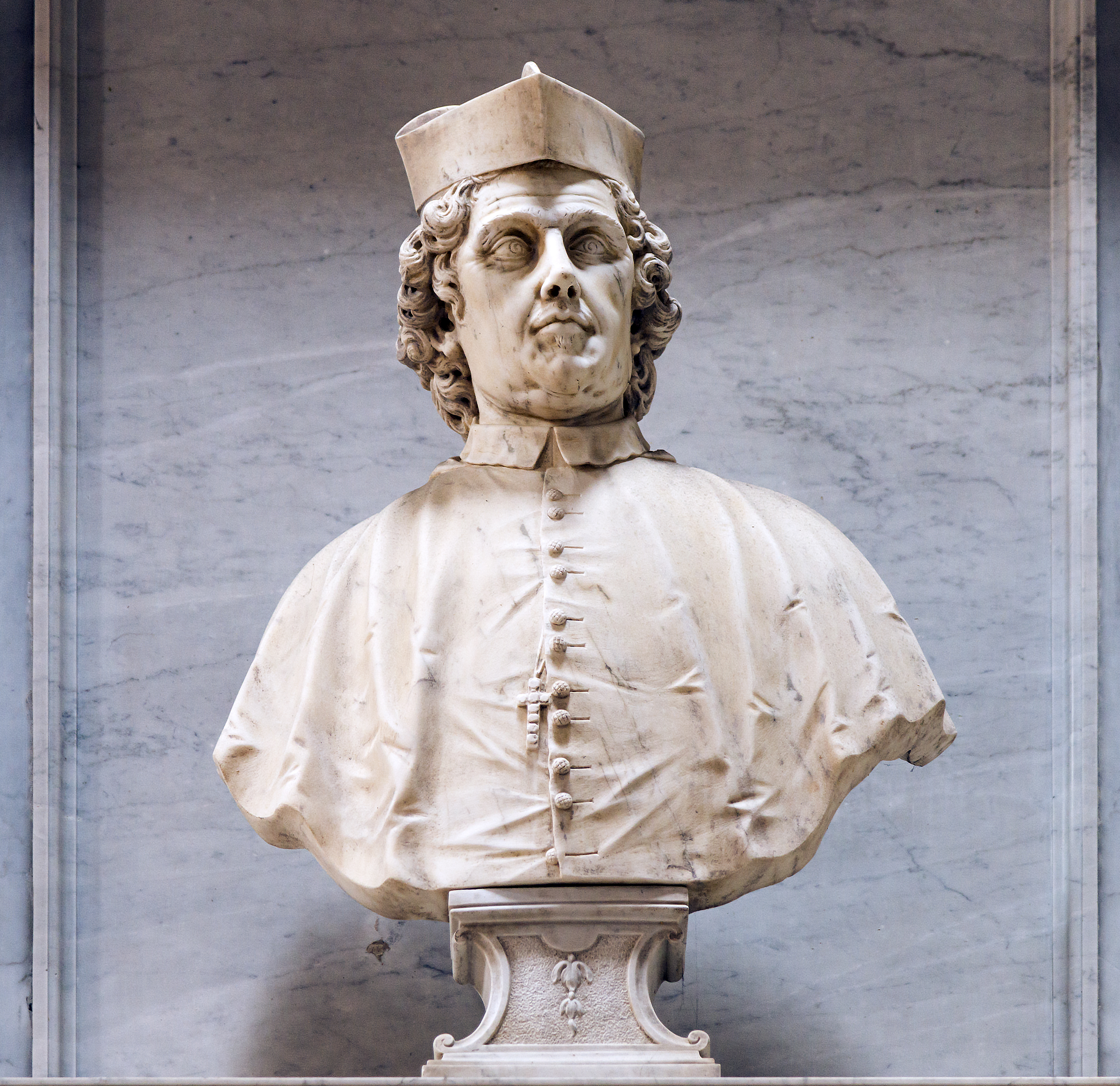
- Church: Roman Catholic
- Appointed: 3 October 1678
- Term ended: 13 Sept 1688
- Predecessor: Giovan Francesco Morosini
- Successor: Giovanni Alberto Badoer

Orders
- Ordination: 25 September 1678 (Priest) by Giacomo Vianoli
- Consecration: 30 October 1678 (Bishop) by Giovanni Delfino

Personal details
- Born: 17 November 1616 Venice, Republic of Venice
- Died: 13 September 1688 (aged 71) Venice, Republic of Venice
- Buried: San Pietro di Castello, Venice

Alvise Sagredo (Latin: Aloysius Sagredo; 17 November 1616 – 13 September 1688) was Venetian aristocrat, ambassador to Turin and Paris, politic and, from 1678 to his death, Patriarch of Venice.

== Life ==
He was born in Venice on 17 November 1616 to a noble family and baptized on 2 January 1617. After the studies, he began to follow his family's mercantile activities, and in particular the timber trade. In October 1651 he began a long journey to France, Spain, Holland and England which lasted more than a year.

On 1 March 1654 he entered in the Venetian Senate. On 2 May 1662 he was appointed by the Senate extraordinary ambassador to Charles Emmanuel II, Duke of Savoy and the next 14 November he became ambassador of Venice to Louis XIV, King of France, to who he asked to support Venice in the Cretan War against the Ottoman Empire.

He returned to Venice at the end of 1665, where he served the Republic of Venice in various roles, including member of the Council of Ten (6 August 1669) and mayor of Padua (1672–1674). Due to the rigid rules, he had to abandon politics with the election of his older brother Nicolò as Doge on 6 February 1675. When his brother died in August 1676, he began political life again, and was even elected in the Council of Ten on 1 August 1677.

On 10 August 1678, after the death of the Patriarch of Venice Giovan Francesco Morosini, the Venetian Senate elected Sagredo as his successor. He received the minor orders in on 21 August thus becoming part of the clergy, and he was ordained deacon and priest on 21 and 25 September respectively. In the meantime he obtained a degree in utroque iure from the university of Padua on 31 August. His appointment as Patriarch was validated by the Pope Innocent XI on 3 October 1678. Alvise Sagredo was consecrated bishop on 30 October 1678 by the Cardinal Giovanni Delfino in the church of Santa Lucia in Venice. He took possession of the Patriarchate on next 8 November.

As Patriarch he performed thirteen pastoral visits, consecrated two churches and conveyed a synod in 1686. He died in Venice on 13 September 1688 after twelve days of illness, and he was buried in the cathedral of San Pietro di Castello in Venice.
