= Giovanni Trevisan =

Patriarch of Venice (1503–1590)

- Patriarch of Venice
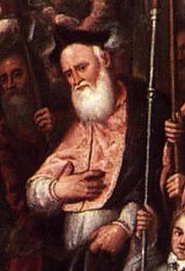
- Church: Catholic Church
- See: Patriarch of Venice
- Appointed: 14 February 1560
- Term ended: 3 August 1590
- Predecessor: Vincenzo Diedo
- Successor: Lorenzo Priuli

Orders
- Consecration: 8 September 1560 (Bishop) by Pier Francesco Ferrero bishop of Vercelli

Personal details
- Born: 13 July 1503 Venezia
- Died: 3 August 1590 (aged 87) Venezia
- Buried: San Pietro di Castello in Venice

Giovanni Trevisan (Latin: Joannes Trivisanus; 1503 – 1590) was Patriarch of Venice from 1560 to his death.

== Life ==
He was born in Venice on 13 July 1503 to the patrician Paolo di Andrea Trevisan and Anna di Giovanni Emo.

He entered the Benedictine Order and, after graduating in utroque iure at the University of Padua, in 1530 he became abbot of the monastery of San Cipriano in Murano, succeeding his paternal uncle of the same name who had renounced the title. During this office he paid for the restoration of the ciborium and the construction of a large side chapel.

On 10 December 1559, after the patriarch of Venice Vincenzo Diedo died, the Venetian Senate elected Trevisan as his successor. The choice was validated by Pope Pius IV on 14 February 1560, who at the same time confirmed his ad personam possession of San Cipriano. Giovanni Trevisan was consecrated bishop in San Pietro di Castello, on 8 September 1560 by the Nuncio in Venice, Pier Francesco Ferrero.

The election of Trevisan, the first religious after a series of lay prelates chosen from among patricians, was a compromise to obtain from the pope the formalization of a tradition, namely the choice of the patriarch by the government of the Republic of Venice. This agreement, unger the form of patronage, took place through a bull dated 15 September 1561. After years of disagreements, the Republic of Venice and the Papacy found a moment of harmony. Venice was thus able to participate directly in the final phase of the Council of Trent, through the appointment of its cardinal Bernardo Navagero as president of the assembly. Trevisan himself was involved in the counciliar work: he proposed to include the episcopate among the holy orders, participated in the debate on clandestine marriages and signed the reform of the Index of prohibited books.

Returned to Venice, Trevisan put into practice the reforms of the council and convened diocesan synods (1564, 1571 and 1578) in which he dealt with disciplining the clergy: priests were forbidden to rent properties to dishonest people, to gamble, to frequent taverns, to dance and to wear colored clothes; moreover, they had to wear a clearly visible tonsure and keep perpetuals of unquestionable morality. In reality, these were norms that were not new compared to previous synods and which in any case found little application.

The only event of some importance that marked his episcopate was the establishment of the seminary. Since 1563 Pius IV had requested its foundation to the patriarch, but due to the necessary means and the opposition of the Senate and clergy the appeal was not received. The question was revived later by Pope Gregory XIII, who was concerned about the ignorance and laxity of the Venetian priests, as well as the tolerance towards German merchants of the Protestant confession. He then sent to Venice Cardinal Federico Borromeo, who blamed the situation on Trevisan. Borromeo invited the pope to send an apostolic visitor and Alberto Bolognetti was chosen, with the support of the Venetian bishops Federico Cornaro and Agostino Valier, in order not to create tensions with the government.

Finally, on 23 January 1581, the patriarchal seminary was opened, initially at the church of San Geremia, and shortly after in the monastery of San Cipriano of which Trevisan continued to be the abbot. It was preceded by a similar initiative by the Senate which, on 23 April 1579, had established the ducal seminary for the training of the clergy destined for the basilica of San Marco, which was under direct control of the Doge's Palace.

In the same period, an apostolic visit to the Patriarchate of Venice was carried out by the bishops Lorenzo Campeggi, Bolognetti's successor, and Valier. Relations between Venice and the Papacy had worsened again due to the sharpening of the anti-curial positions carried forward by the young members of the Senate; Trevisan embraced this policy and when the two visitors showed up at the cathedral of San Pietro on 29 May 1581, he didn't show up. In the subsequent interrogation he gave vague answers and he was not collaborative: he shared the fear of the Senate that Rome would make an end to the old tradition that the parish priests were elected by the pocal population. Naturally, the two bishops were not satisfied with his conduct and on 11 August 1581 they issued provisions in which they reaffirmed the need to apply the Tridentine decrees, in particular with regard to pastoral visits, Sunday preaching and control over the life of the clergy. The Senate allowed this apostolic visit to assess just one parish in the whole Venice.

In 1587 he tried to pass on the title of abbot of San Cipriano to his nephew Giovanni Emo, but he was stopped by the patrician Gradenigo Venetian family. He then succeeded in assigning that office to the direct control of the patriarchate, thus granting to the patriarchate an important income also after his death. In the same year he published the Constitutiones et privilegia patriarchatus et cleri Venetiarum where the rules of the ancient Venetian synods are recovered without making any mention of the Tridentine norms.

For the rest, his patriarchate took place within the limits of the ordinary: he consecrated churches and altars, went to Rome for the jubilee of 1575, participated in the transfer of the body of Saint Stephen from the old church of San Giorgio Maggiore to the new Palladian basilica. He died in Venice on 3 August 1590 after four months of illness. He was buried in a tomb, which he had prepared himself some time ago, near the altar of San Giovanni in the cathedral of San Pietro.
