= Filippo da Rimini =

Filippo Morandi (Note: His name is also given as Filippo de' Morandi, or de Morandis in Latin.) (c. 1409 – 1497), usually known as Filippo da Rimini, (Note: His nickname is also given as Arimineo. In Latin he is Philippus Arimineus, Ariminaeus, Ariminensis or de Arimino.) was a humanist, teacher, writer and administrator in the Republic of Venice.

Filippo was born at Rimini probably between 1408 and 1410, since Bernardo Bembo noted that he was almost ninety years old at his death. His father, Federighino, belonged to a prominent local family. Apostolo Zeno believed that he came from a Riminese family living in Treviso, but this is contradicted by Filippo's own writings.

Filippo went abroad for his education. He taught at Padua, Rome and Bologna, finally settling in Venice in 1435. In 1441, he delivered a speech in praise of Doge Francesco Foscari before the ducal court and Francesco Sforza. He became a Venetian citizen on 7 December 1443, by which time his father was dead. He made his residence in Venice for the rest of his life. In 1446, he was the first teacher appointed at Venice's first public school, the chancery school of San Marco. He held that position until 1450. Between 1450 and 1463, he was the chancellor of the Venetian island of Corfu. He wrote a valuable report on the fall of Constantinople to the Ottoman Turks in 1453. In 1463, he took up teaching at San Marco again. In 1466, he left for a second time to serve as chancellor to Maffeo Gherardi, Patriarch of Venice. He remained with the patriarch for many years and died at Venice in 1497.

Filippo was patronized by Francesco Barbaro and possibly Bernard Bembo. He delivered an oration at the funeral of Barbaro in 1454. He maintained a correspondence with Barbaro, Andrea Contrario, Vinciguerra Dandolo, Pietro Dolfin, Andrea Donato, Ermolao Donato, Roberto Malatesta, the monks of San Michele di Murano and Cardinal Ludovico Trevisan. He wrote political and spiritual poetry in Latin. His most important other writings are:

- Epithalamium, dedicated to Caterina Caldiera
- Excidium Constantinopolitanae urbis quae quondam Bizantium ferebatur, his account of the fall of Constantinople, dedicated to Barbaro. This account is one of the earliest to portray the Turks as descendants of the Teucri (Trojans) seeking revenge for the Trojan War. He relates the story that Sultan Mehmed II raped a virgin at the altar of the Hagia Sophia in revenge for the rape of Cassandra.
- Invectiva in vanissimos homines, a manuscript of which was owned by Pietro Barozzi
- Symposium de paupertate

His last known work was a collection of 42 Latin epigrams on the glory of Venice, dedicated to Bembo and composed when he was eighty years old.
