= Ana Marija Marović =

Italian painter

- Born: 1815
- Died: 1887 (aged 71–72)
- Occupations: Writer; painter

Ana Marija Marović (pseudonym Filotea; 1815 – 3 October 1887) was a writer and painter in Italy and Montenegro. She also founded a women's congregation and co-founded the Instituto Canal ai Servi, an institution devoted to helping women. A cause for her beatification in the Catholic Church was formally opened on 12 January 1952, and she was declared a Servant of God. Some of her poems were republished in 1963 and 1997.

== Life ==
Ana Marija Marović was born in 1815 in Venice, at that time part of the Austrian-held Kingdom of Lombardy–Venetia. Her father was Captain Jozo Marović, a ship-owner and merchant, and her mother was Marija Ivanović. Her parents were originally from the Bay of Kotor region, but settled in Venice.

Marović wrote several books, including Thoughts on Women’s Clothing, Rules for Girls on Living as a Christian, Reminders and Prayers for Good Confession, Communion, Thoughts on Love of God, On First Devotion, Sonnets, and Memoirs. She also wrote poetry, which she published under the pseudonym Filotea when she was in her thirties. Marović's writing was encouraged by her teacher Danijel Kanal and cardinal Jakov Monico (also known as Giacomo Monico). She knew the Italian and Serbian languages.

In 1859 Marović and Daniel Canal founded the Instituto Canal ai Servi, and Marović also founded a women's congregation to run the Institute, the Institute of Correctional Sisters Dedicated to the Sacred Hearts of Jesus and Mary of the Immaculate Conception. After five years, the Institute began to operate, rehabilitating female offenders and prostitutes, and training them for employment.

Marović was also a painter, and composer of religious music. Her paintings are of the Nazarene school, and can be found in churches throughout Venice, Zagreb, and the Bay of Kotor.

Marović died on 3 October 1887. She was buried in San Michele Cemetery in Venice, but her remains were moved to the chapel of the Canal-Marović Institute in 1926.

== Legacy ==
A cause for Marović's beatification in the Catholic Church was formally opened on 12 January 1952, and she was declared a Servant of God.

A translation of Marović's poems was made and published by Don Gracija Ivanović in 1963. In 1997, an edition of her sonnets, titled Ana Marija Marović, Sonnets was published.
