= Antonio Surian =

- Patriarch of Venice
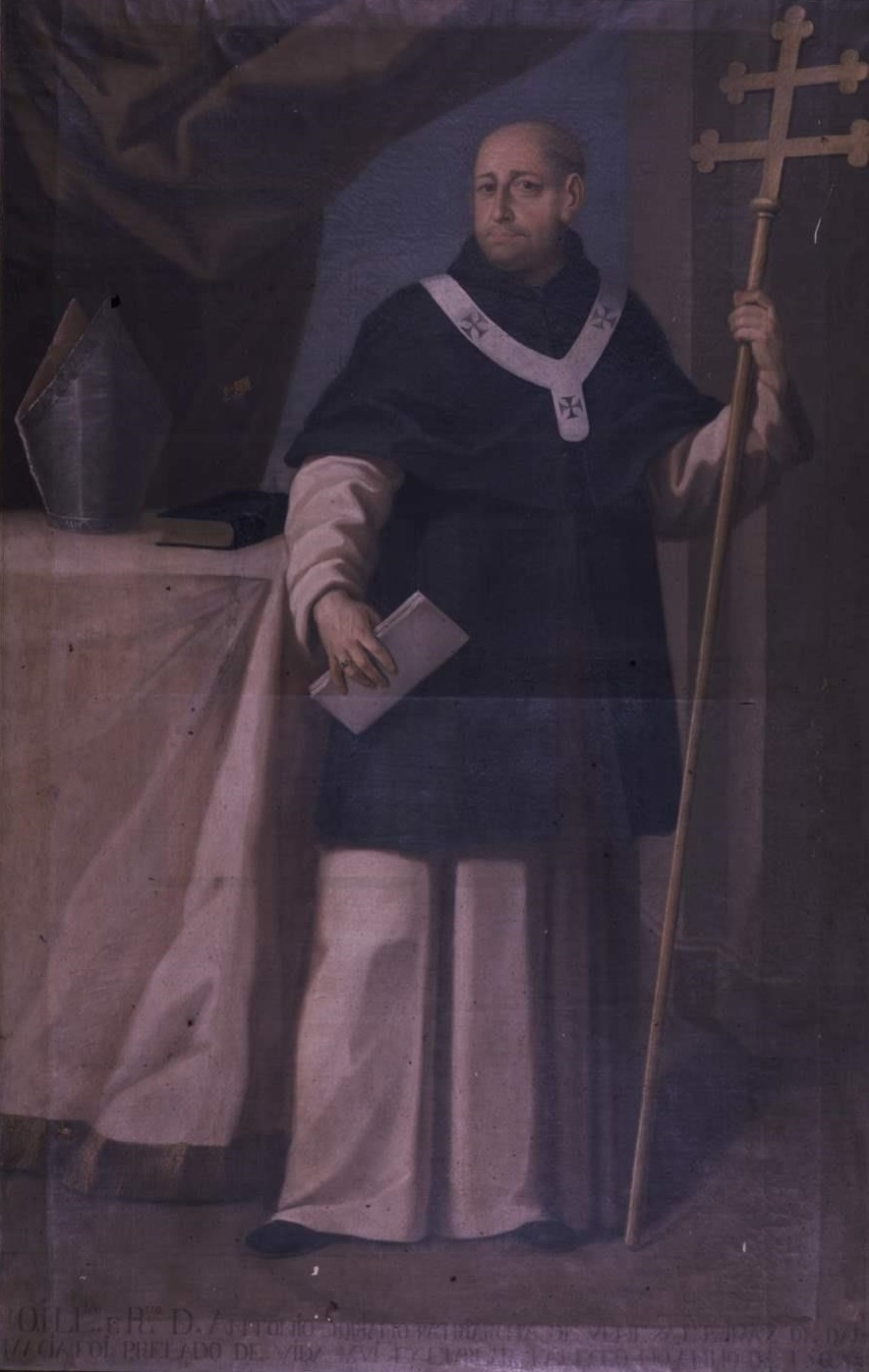
- Church: Catholic Church
- See: Patriarch of Venice
- Appointed: 27 November 1504
- Term ended: 19 May 1508
- Predecessor: Tomaso Donà
- Successor: Alvise Contarini

Orders
- Consecration: 9 February 1505 (Bishop) by Francesco Quirini bishop of Durrës

Personal details
- Born: 25 November 1455 Venezia
- Died: 19 May 1508 (aged 52) Venezia
- Buried: Charterhouse of Saint Andrew near Venice

Antonio Surian (Latin: Antonius Surianus, 1455 – 1508) was Patriarch of Venice from 1504 to his death.

== Life ==
He was born in Venice on 25 November 1455 to the patrician Giovanni and Margherita Civran. He was the uncle of the Venetian politician and ambassador, Antonio Surian (1483 – 1542).

At the age of eighteen he became a Carthusian monk and was sent to study in Padua. In 1484 he was moved to the charterhouse of Saint Andrew in the La Certosa island very near to the town of Venice. He served his order also in diplomatic missions, in France and in Germany, where probably he served also the secret service of the Republic. From 1497 to 1500 he was Prior of the Carthusian charterhouse in Padua, and from 1500 he returned at the monastery of Saint Andrew as Prior.

On 13 November 1504, after the patriarch of Venice Tommaso Donà died, the Venetian Senate elected Surian as his successor. The choice was validated by Pope Julius II on 27 November. Antonio Surian took possession of Venice's cathedral San Pietro di Castello on 2 February 1505, and he was consecrated bishop in the same church a week later by Francesco Quirini, bishop of Durrës.

On 30 April 1507 Antonio Surian ordered that all churches of Venice shall be closed at sunset to avoid abuses. He died in Venice on 19 May 1508, and he was buried in his previous church of the Carthusians monastery in the island of Certosa.
