= Riese Pio X =

Riese Pio X Rieze
- Comune
- Comune di Riese Pio X
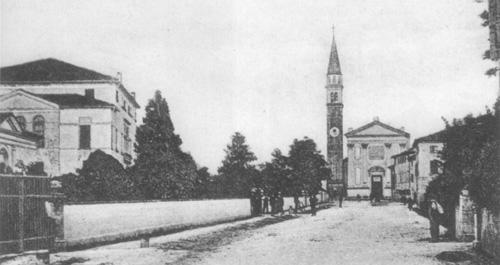
- A 20th century photograph of Riese

- Coat of arms

- Location within Italy Location within Veneto
- Coordinates: 45°43′40″N 11°55′00″E
- Country: Italy
- Region: Veneto
- Province: Treviso (TV)
- Frazioni: Poggiana, Spineda

Government
  - Mayor: Ombretta Basso

Area
  - Total: 30.64 km^{2} (11.83 sq mi)
- Elevation: 65 m (213 ft)

Population (30 June 2025)
  - Total: 10,986
  - Density: 358.6/km^{2} (928.6/sq mi)
- Demonym: Riesini
- Time zone: UTC+1 (CET)
  - Summer (DST): UTC+2 (CEST)
- Postal code: 31039
- Dialing code: 0423
- Patron saint: Saint Matthew
- Saint day: 21 September
- Website: Official website

Riese (Venetian: Rieze), officially Riese Pio X, is a municipality in northeast Italy located in the province of Treviso in the Region of Veneto. The community's name, much like that of Sotto il Monte Giovanni XXIII, commemorates its most famous son, Giuseppe Melchiore Sarto, who later became Pope Pius X (Italian: Pio X).

== Physical geography ==
The municipality is located halfway between Castelfranco Veneto and Asolo in the upper part of the Venetian plain. Dominated by the Monte Grappa massif. The territory, entirely flat, is morphologically divided into two parts: the one to the east is made up of reddish, basically arid soil, the one to the west is instead characterized by the overlapping of alluvial deposits of the Muson stream.

== Origin of the name ==
The specification "Pio X" was added to the official name of the municipality in 1952, in honor of Pope Saint Pius X. He was proclaimed a saint on May 29, 1954 and the municipality wanted to enrich the original name of the capital with his name, as a sign of gratitude towards the greatest of its sons.

== Contemporary history ==
After the end of the Serenissima, Riese went through the convulsive period that alternated between French and Austrian administration and vice versa, before becoming definitively Austrian with the birth of the Lombardy-Venetian kingdom. Like the rest of Veneto, it became part of the Kingdom of Italy in 1866. These events did not influence the economic conditions of the territory, which remained poor and rural.

In the same 19th century, the two most illustrious personalities of the country stood out: Giacomo Monico (1776–1851), patriarch of Venice from 1827 to his death, and above all Giuseppe Sarto (1835–1914), patriarch of Venice from 1893 until his election to the pontificate in 1903, becoming Pius X.

In 1917, after the defeat at the Battle of Caporetto, Riese found itself close to the front, located on Mount Grappa and along the Piave, and trenches were dug along the Musone and north of the municipal capital.

In the Second World War, the partisan resistance was very active in the area, represented by the "Martiri del Grappa" brigade commanded by Primo Visentin of Poggiana, known by the battle name of "Masaccio" and awarded the gold medal for military valor. Piero Monico, Venetian great-grandson of the Patriarch of Venice and political leader of the Veneto CLN, also resided incognito in the Riese area. Sentenced to death by Mussolini, he lived in hiding between Riese and Castello di Godego, coordinating the local resistance.

In 1944, on the occasion of the exhumation of the incorrupt body of Pope Pius, the municipality of Riese welcomed the empty sarcophagus of the Supreme Pontiff to be permanently kept in the parish church of San Matteo.

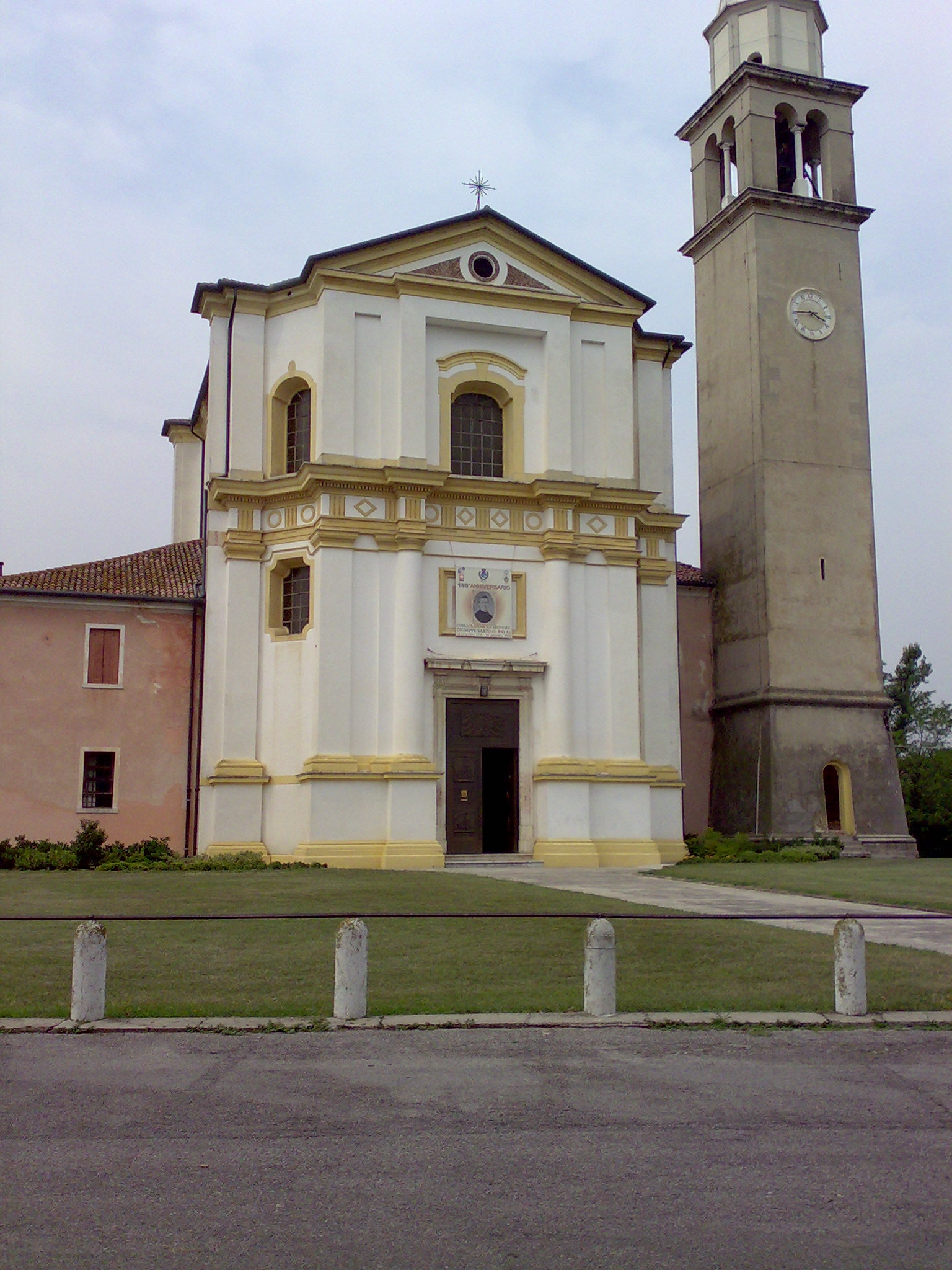
The Sanctuary of the Blessed Virgin of Cendrole

== Monuments and places of interest ==
- Parish Church of San Matteo: as attested by the tombstone of the parish priest Andrea de Ziroldis, in 1412 the church of San Matteo was certainly a parish church, by now completely replacing the dignity of the Cendrole.
- The sanctuary of the Blessed Virgin of Cendrole is a place of worship of pagan origin which in subsequent centuries was converted into a Marian sanctuary. Inside there are paintings dating back to the 16th and 20th centuries including the portrait of Saint Eurosia by Noè Bordignon. Between the church and the bell tower there are the remains of a Roman epigraph, the tombstone of Lucius Vilonius.
- Tomb of the partisan master and commander Primo Visentin "Masaccio", in the small cemetery of the hamlet of Poggiana, decorated with a gold medal for Military Valour.
- The birthplace of Saint Pius, donated by Maria Sarto (1846–1930), sister of the pontiff, to the municipality of Riese in 1926, it preserves domestic furnishings of the Sarto family.
- The Museum of Saint Pius X: The birthplace and museum is visited every year by around 15,000 people. The complex of the Birthplace and Museum of San Pio X is managed by the Giuseppe Sarto Foundation, founded in 1985 shortly after the visit of Pope Saint John Paul II to Riese Pio X on the occasion of the 150th anniversary of the birth of Pius X and which aims to be a centre for studies and historical research on the figure and work of Pope Sarto.
- The Spanish monument to Saint Pius X dating back to 1935 is a gift from Spanish Catholics.

== Society ==
=== Demographic evolution ===
Historical population

Year	Pop.	±%
1861	?	—
1871	3,891	—
1881	4,245	+9.1%
1901	4,872	+14.8%
1911	5,822	+19.5%
1921	6,283	+7.9%

Year	Pop.	±%
1931	6,353	+1.1%
1936	6,424	+1.1%
1951	6,690	+4.1%
1961	6,004	−10.3%
1971	6,615	+10.2%
1981	7,272	+9.9%

Year	Pop.	±%
1991	8,342	+14.7%
2001	9,628	+15.4%
2011	10,889	+13.1%
2021	10,901	+0.1%

Source: Data from ISTAT

=== Foreign ethnicities and minorities ===
As of December 31, 2024 there were 1100 foreigners residing in the municipality, or 9.9% of the population. The largest foreign communities are those coming from:

1. Romania 572
2. Morocco 107
3. Ghana 60
4. North Macedonia 45
5. Kosovo 34

== Culture ==
=== Fairs and events ===
- March "De Bepi Sarto" since 1973 on the last Saturday of May, it is a night march of about 10 km through the territory of the municipality with a route that passes through the Santuario delle Cendrole, the place where the young Giuseppe Melchiorre Sarto, then Pius X went to pray.
- Bird fair at the end of July in the Villa Eger park
- Living nativity scene on the Saturday before Christmas.
- Palio dei Mussi, every third Sunday of September, consisting of a donkey riding race (in dialect "musso") between the historic villages of the town (La Piazza, Jare, Pasoti, Cendrole, Terre Grosse, Pojana, Spinea, Valla).
- Historical reconstruction of the Ancient Crafts, on Saturday evening and Sunday of the palio.
- Artistic nativity scene at the nursery school (kindergarten) from the third Sunday of December until the last Sunday of January.

== Administration ==
=== Sister cities ===
- (Australia) Griffith
- (Canada) Guelph
- (Poland) Sochaczew
- (Slovakia) Zahorska Bystrica

=== Mayors ===
Period		Office holder	Party	Title	Notes
10 June 2024	in office	Ombretta Basso	Lista civica "Scelgo Riese"	Mayor	

== Sport ==
- On May 31, 2007, Riese Pio X hosted the arrival of the 18th stage of the Giro d'Italia 2007, won in a sprint by Alessandro Petacchi.
- On March 29 and 30, 2008, it hosted the European Karate Championships.
- On July 3, 2010, Riese Pio X hosted the arrival of the 2nd stage of the Giro Donne 2010, won in a sprint by Ina-Yoko Teutenberg.
- On May 26, 2013, it hosted the start of the last stage of the Giro d'Italia.
- In 2016, the local team Basket Riese won the regional championship of Serie D, returning to Serie C Silver.
