= Francesco Vendramin =

17th-century Catholic cardinal

His Eminence Francesco Vendramin
- Cardinal, Patriarch of Venice
- Church: Catholic Church
- In office: 1605–1619
- Predecessor: Matteo Zane
- Successor: Giovanni Tiepolo
- Other post: Cardinal-Priest of San Giovanni a Porta Latina (1616–19)

Orders
- Consecration: 26 May 1608 by Pope Paul V
- Created cardinal: 2 December 1615 by Pope Paul V
- Rank: Cardinal-Priest

Personal details
- Born: 10 October 1555 Venice, Republic of Venice
- Died: 7 October 1619 (aged 63) Venice, Republic of Venice

Francesco Vendramin (10 October 1555 – 7 October 1619) was a Venetian aristocrat and ambassador. He was Patriarch of Venice from 1605 to his death, and a Cardinal from 1615.

== Biography ==
Francesco Vendramin was born on 10 October 1555 in Venice, the second son of Marco Vendramin and Maria Contarini. His brother was named Luca and a sister, whose name is unknown, married Pietro Loredan.

He was chosen by the Venetian Senate to accompany Henry I, Duke of Guise, on his visit to the Republic of Venice in 1583. From 1585 to 1589 he was ambassador of the Republic to the Duchy of Savoy, then from 1592 to 1595 ambassador to Spain, 1597 to Austria and 1598 to France, where he remained until 1600. From 1600 to 1604 he was Venetian ambassador to the Holy See and in this position he visited Pope Paul V in 1605 to congratulate him on his election.

As a layman, he was elected to the office of Patriarch of Venice by the Venetian Senate on 26 July 1605 with 132 votes to 73. The election was confirmed by the Pope only on 12 May 1608 because of the Venetian Interdict, a heavy diplomatic quarrel between the Papal Curia and the Republic of Venice during which Vendramin left the government of the Patriarchate to a vicar. The following 26 May 1608, Pope Paul V consecrated him bishop in Vatican, with the assistance of Fabio Biondi, Titular Patriarch of Jerusalem, and Metello Bichi, Bishop Emeritus of Sovana.

In the next two years Vendramin aligned so much himself with the politics of the Papal Curia that on 15 January 1610 the Full College (i.e. the government of the Republic of Venice) formally rebuked him, and from that moment on he limited himself to ordinary administrative episcopal acts.

The Pope named him a cardinal in the consistory on 2 December 1615. He received the cardinal's hat and the title of San Giovanni a Porta Latina on 28 November of the following year. In Venice, on 18 January 1617 he consecrated the church of the Benedictine nuns in San Zaccaria and took care of the restoration of the Patriarch's Palace, not forgetting to make generous donations to the poor and to the cult of the Blessed Virgin Mary.

Patriarch Vendramin died in Venice on 7 October 1619 and was buried in the chapel of Santa Maria del Carmine, built in San Pietro di Castello (the Patriarch's Cathedral until 1807) in 1654 by Baldassare Longhena. According to his wishes, no inscription was placed on his gravestone, except for an epigram on the side wall of the chapel, which still commemorates him today. A marble relief by Michele Fabris shows the presentation of the cardinal's hat by Pope Paul V to Vendramin.

Catholic Church titles
Preceded by Matteo Zane	Patriarch of Venice; 1608–1619	Succeeded by Giovanni Tiepolo
Preceded by Bernard Maciejowski	Cardinal-Priest of San Giovanni a Porta Latina; 1616–1619	Succeeded by Guido Bentivoglio d'Aragona
