= Angelo Ramazzotti =

Patriarch of Venice

Venerable Angelo Ramazzotti
- Patriarch of Venice
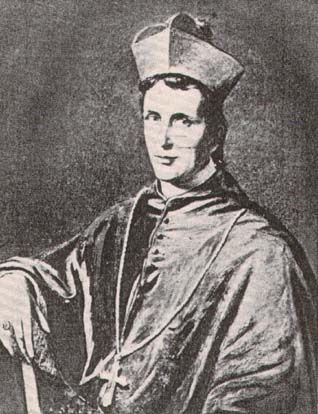
- Church: Roman Catholic Church
- Archdiocese: Venice
- See: Venice
- Appointed: 15 March 1858
- Installed: 15 May 1858
- Term ended: 24 September 1861
- Predecessor: Giovanni Pietro Aurelio Mutti
- Successor: Giuseppe Luigi Trevisanato
- Previous post: Bishop of Pavia (1850–1858)

Orders
- Ordination: 13 June 1829
- Consecration: 30 June 1850 by Giacomo Filippo Fransoni
- Rank: Patriarch

Personal details
- Born: Angelo Francesco Ramazzotti; 3 August 1800 Milan, Cisalpine Republic
- Died: 24 September 1861 (aged 61) Crespano del Grappa, Treviso, Kingdom of Italy

Sainthood
- Venerated in: Roman Catholic Church
- Title as Saint: Venerable
- Attributes: Archbishop's attire
- Patronage: Pontifical Institute for Foreign Missions

Angelo Francesco Ramazzotti (3 August 1800 – 24 September 1861) was an Italian Roman Catholic prelate who served as the Patriarch of Venice. He established the Pontifical Institute for Foreign Missions in 1850. Ramazzotti had served as the Bishop of Pavia prior to his relocation to Venice and died less than a week before Pope Pius IX was scheduled to make him a cardinal.

He gained popularity from his support and focus on the struggles of the archdiocese by whom he was regarded as a savior of Venice.

His cause of beatification has commenced and he was bestowed with the title of Servant of God in 1976. Pope Francis recognized his life of heroic virtue and conferred upon him the title of Venerable on 14 December 2015.

== Biography ==
Angelo Francesco Ramazzotti was born in Milan on 3 August 1800 as the second of two sons to Giuseppe Ramazzotti and Giulia Maderna. His elder brother was Filippo. He received confirmation in October 1806 and felt his religious vocation which awakened in him a desire to become part of the priesthood. He studied in Pavia where he obtained a doctorate in both canon law and civil law on 10 August 1823. He practiced law until 1826 when he went to become a priest.

He received the minor orders on 22 December 1826 and 21 December 1827. Ramazzotti later received the subdiaconate on 14 March 1829 and the diaconate on 4 April 1829. He was ordained to the priesthood on 13 June 1829. He became a member of the Oblate Missionaries of Rho after his ordination. He was elected as the order's superior-general three times.

Pope Pius IX appointed him as the Bishop of Pavia in 1850 and he received episcopal consecration a month after the appointment in the church of San Carlo al Corso on 30 June 1850. He wanted to refuse the appointment but accepted in obedience to the pontiff. He was installed on 20 September 1850, during his instillation he frequently visited several local hospitals and orphanages in an attempt to support positive relations with the community and the church of San Carlo al Corso..

He founded the Pontifical Institute for Foreign Missions in 1850 and was later promoted as the Patriarch of Venice in 1858, a role he innitially rejected however would accept and be officially ordained in 1859.

Official news on 22 August 1861 revealed that Ramazzotti would be promoted to the cardinalate on 27 September 1861 which Ramazzotti refused due to the health risks presented by his angina pectoris. He also made an appeal to Cardinal Giacomo Antonelli on the grounds on his financial condition that he could not afford the expenses for the cardinalate.

Angelo Ramazzotti died on 24 September 1861 in Crespano del Grappa where he had gone in order to recover from his ailments. Bishop Giovanni Antonio arranged his funeral and he was buried in Saint Mark's Basilica. His remains were later transferred to Milan on 3 March 1957. The Patriarch of Venice, Cardinal Angelo Giuseppe Roncalli; and Archbishop of Milan Giovanni Battista Montini presided over the transferral where Roncalli hailed Ramazzotti as a "true saint".

== Sainthood ==
The cause of beatification commenced under Pope Paul VI on 13 February 1976. This bestowed him with the posthumous title of Servant of God. The process commenced on a diocesan level at exactly the same time which concluded its work on 16 February 1978. That process was validated on 4 December 1998. The Positio - which documented his life of heroic virtue - was submitted to the Congregation for the Causes of Saints in Rome in 1999.

The historical consultants to the cause met in 2014 and the theological consultants approved the documentation on 3 March 2015. It went to the Congregation for the Causes of Saints before it could go to the pope for approval - that meeting of the congregation took place on 3 November 2015 though further discussions were held on 1 December 2015. Pope Francis recognized his life of heroic virtue on 14 December 2015 which allowed him to confer upon him the title of Venerable.

Catholic Church titles
Preceded by Paolo Lamberto D'Allègre	Bishop of Pavia; 20 May 1850-15 March 1858	Succeeded by Pietro Maria Ferré
Preceded by Pier Aurelio Mutti, O.S.B.	Patriarch of Venice; 15 March 1858-24 September 1861	Succeeded by Giuseppe Luigi Trevisanato
