= Giovan Francesco Morosini =

Giovan Francesco Morosini may refer to:

- Giovan Francesco Morosini (cardinal) (1537–1596), Venetian Catholic cardinal
- Giovan Francesco Morosini (patriarch) (1604–1678), patriarch of Venice
