= Miguel Rangel =

Miguel Rangel may refer to:

- Miguel Rangel (bishop)
- Miguel Rangel (politician)
