= Giuseppe Luigi Trevisanato =

Italian Roman Catholic cardinal

His Eminence Giuseppe Luigi Trevisanato
- Cardinal, Patriarch of Venice
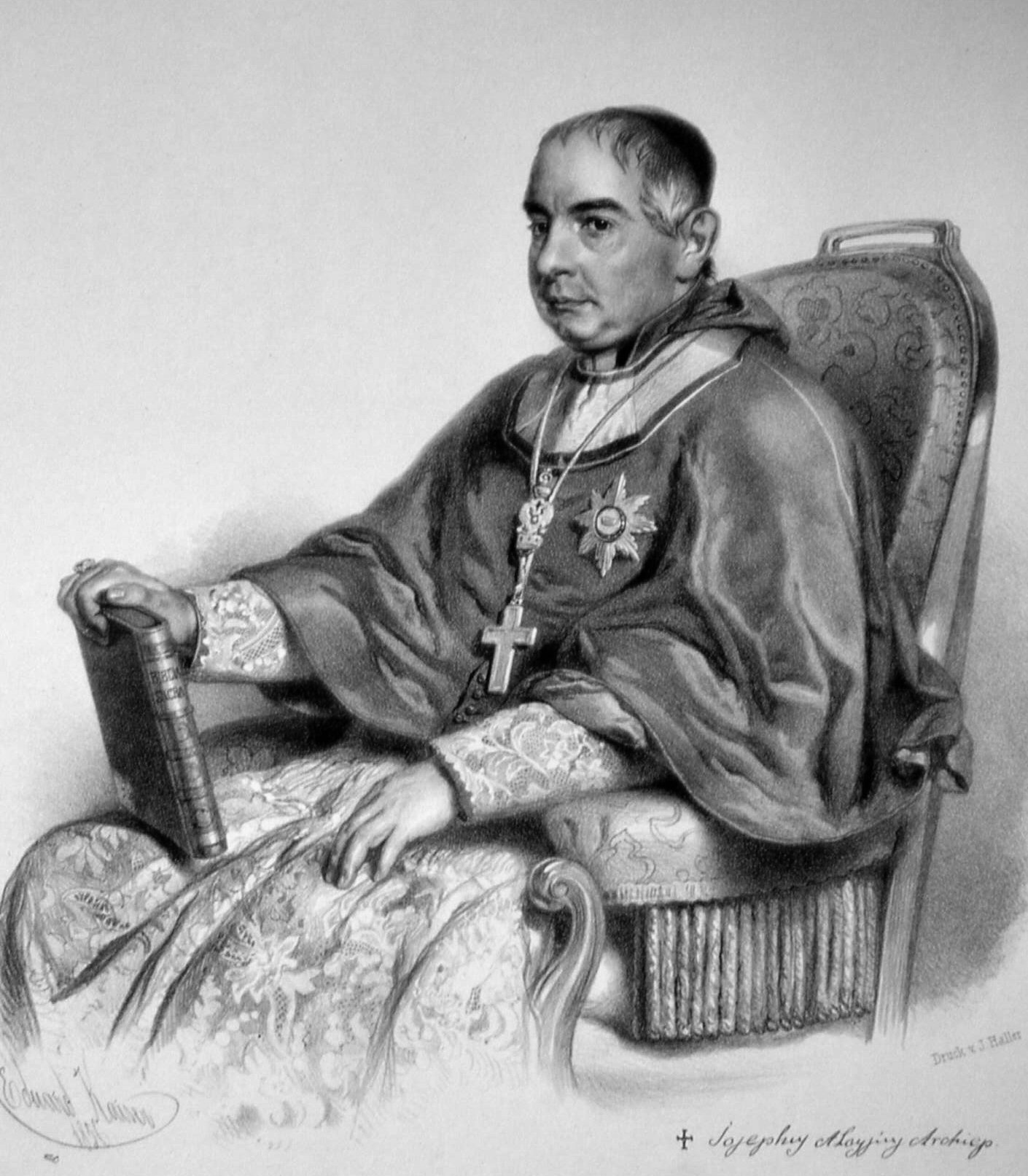
- Church: Roman Catholic Church
- Archdiocese: Venice
- See: Venice
- Appointed: 7 April 1862
- Term ended: 28 April 1877
- Predecessor: Angelo Ramazzotti
- Successor: Domenico Agostini
- Other post: Cardinal-Priest of Santi Nereo ed Achilleo (1863-77)
- Previous posts: Bishop of Verona (1852); Archbishop of Udine (1852-62)

Orders
- Ordination: 13 March 1824 by Ladislaus Pyrker
- Consecration: 16 January 1853 by Fabio Maria Asquini
- Created cardinal: 16 March 1863 by Pope Pius IX
- Rank: Cardinal-Priest

Personal details
- Born: Giuseppe Luigi Trevisanato; 15 February 1801 Venice
- Died: 28 April 1877 (aged 76) Venice
- Education: Patriarchal Seminary of Venice
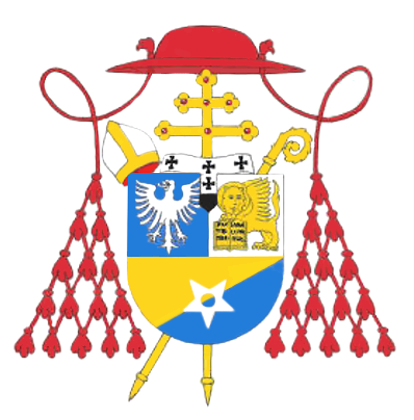
- Coat of arms

Giuseppe Luigi Trevisanato (15 February 1801 – 28 April 1877) was an Italian Roman Catholic cardinal who served as the Patriarch of Venice from 1862 until his death.

== Life Events ==
Date	Age	Event	Title
15 Feb 1801	0	Born	Venice (Giudecca)
13 Mar 1824	23.1	Ordained Priest	Priest
15 Mar 1852	51.1	Appointed	Bishop of Verona, Italy
26 May 1852	51.3	Selected	Archbishop of Udine, Italy
27 Sep 1852	51.6	Confirmed	Archbishop of Udine, Italy
16 Jan 1853	51.9	Ordained Bishop	Archbishop of Udine, Italy
17 Jan 1862	60.9	Selected	Patriarch of Venezia {Venice}, Italy
7 Apr 1862	61.1	Confirmed	Patriarch of Venezia {Venice}, Italy
16 Mar 1863	62.1	Elevated to Cardinal	
22 Sep 1864	63.6	Appointed	Cardinal-Priest of Santi Nereo ed Achilleo
28 Apr 1877	76.2	Died	Patriarch of Venezia {Venice}, Italy
