= Giovan Francesco Morosini (patriarch) =

Patriarch of Venice from 1644 until his 1678

- Patriarch of Venice
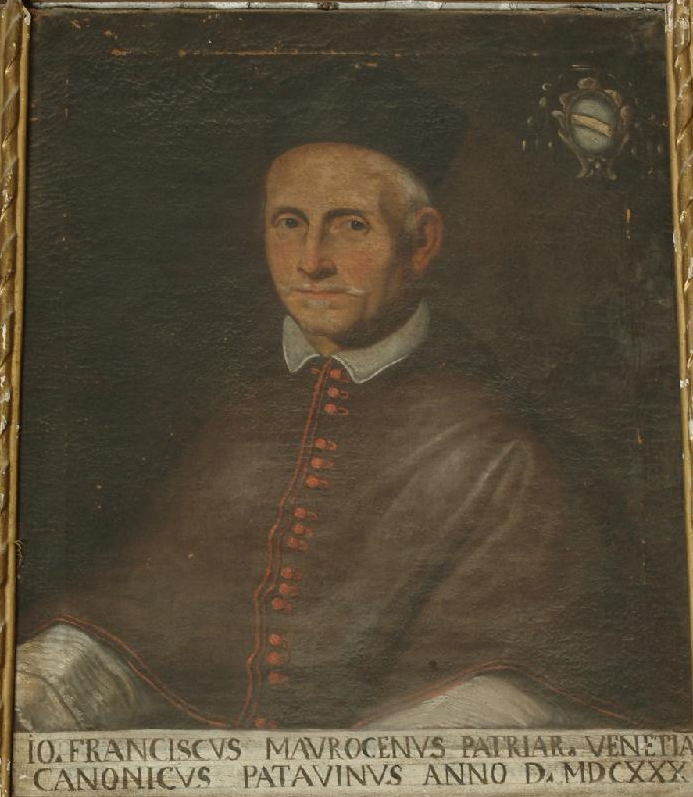
- Church: Roman Catholic
- Appointed: 13 June 1644
- Term ended: 5 August 1678
- Predecessor: Federico Corner
- Successor: Alvise Sagredo

Orders
- Consecration: 4 September 1644 (Bishop) by Marco Giustiniani

Personal details
- Born: 24 September 1604 Venice, Republic of Venice
- Died: 5 August 1678 (aged 73) Venice, Republic of Venice
- Buried: Tolentini, Venice

Giovan Francesco Morosini or Gianfrancesco Morosini (24 September 1604 – 5 August 1678) was Patriarch of Venice from 1644 until his death.

== Life ==
Giovan Francesco Morosini was born in Venice on 24 September 1604 to the noble Morosini family. He completed his studies earning a doctorate in utroque iure in the University of Padua in 1631 and then he moved to Rome.

He was elected patriarch of Venice by the Venetian Senate on 30 April 1644. The episcopal consecration followed on 4 September in the Venetian Church of Santa Croce alla Giudecca by the hands of Marco Giustiniani bishop of Verona.

He was a zealous pastor of the diocese. He had to intervene several times to stop abuses and to ask the priests and lay people to order and morality. He had an intense commitment to support, financially and with prayer, the Republic of Venice then engaged in the War of Candia. Two diocesan synods were held under his patriarchy: the first, in 1653, limited himself to reiterating some ecclesiastical norms already established previously by his predecessor Federico Corner, the second, which was held in 1667, intervened on some aspects of the administration of the sacraments.

He died in Venice on 5 August 1678. He was buried in the church of San Nicola da Tolentino: the magnificent the funeral monument was erected by the Genoese sculptor Filippo Parodi.
