= Maffeo Gherardi =

Italian Roman Catholic bishop and cardinal

His Eminence Maffeo Gherardi
- Patriarch of Venice
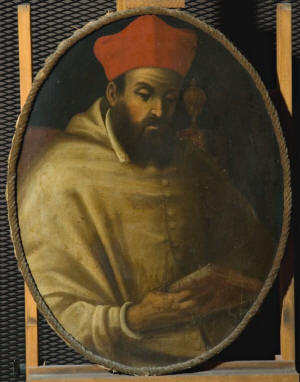
- Church: Catholic Church
- See: Patriarch of Venice
- Appointed: 16 December 1468
- Term ended: 14 September 1492
- Predecessor: Giovanni Barozzi
- Successor: Tommaso Donà

Orders
- Consecration: 9 April 1469 (Bishop) by Placido Pavanello
- Created cardinal: 9 March 1489 by Pope Innocent VIII

Personal details
- Born: 1406 Venezia
- Died: 14 September 1492 (aged 85–86) Terni
- Buried: San Pietro di Castello

Maffeo Gherardi (1406–1492), known as the Cardinal of Venice, was an Italian Roman Catholic bishop and cardinal.

== Life ==
Coat of arms of Cardinal Maffeo Gherardi

Maffeo Gherardi was born in Venice in 1406, the son of nobles Giovanni Gherardi and Cristina Barbarigo.

He entered the Camaldolese Order when young, receiving the habit from Paolo Venerio, Abbot of the Monastery of St. Michael on Murano. Gherardi later became abbot of this monastery, and later Abbot General of the Camaldolese Order.

In April 1466, the Venetian Senate unanimously elected him to be the Patriarch of Venice. Ambassadors of the Republic of Venice presented his selection to Pope Paul II on 31 October 1467 and the pope confirmed his appointment on 16 December 1468. He received the episcopal consecration in San Pietro di Castello on 9 April 1469 by the hands of the bishop of Torcello, Placido Pavanello. Gherardi subsequently held this position for the rest of his life. His chancellor for many years was Filippo da Rimini.

Pope Innocent VIII made him a cardinal priest in pectore in the consistory of 9 March 1489. On 3 July 1489 the pope declared that his creation would be published in the next consistory at which cardinals were created, and that if the pope died before such a consistory, he would nevertheless be eligible to participate in the next Papal Conclave. Following the death of Pope Innocent VIII, Gherardi traveled to Rome, then in the midst of a sede vacante, arriving on 3 August 1492. At the insistence of the Venetian Council of Ten, the College of Cardinals published his creation as a cardinal and allowed him to participate in the papal conclave of 1492, where he cast the decisive vote in favor of Pope Alexander VI. He received as Titular church the deaconry of Santi Sergio e Bacco.

On his way back to Venice, he died in Terni on 14 September 1492. He is buried in San Pietro di Castello in Venice.
