= Federico Baldissera Bartolomeo Cornaro =

Italian cardinal

His Eminence Federico Baldissera Bartolomeo Cornaro
- Cardinal-Bishop of Albano
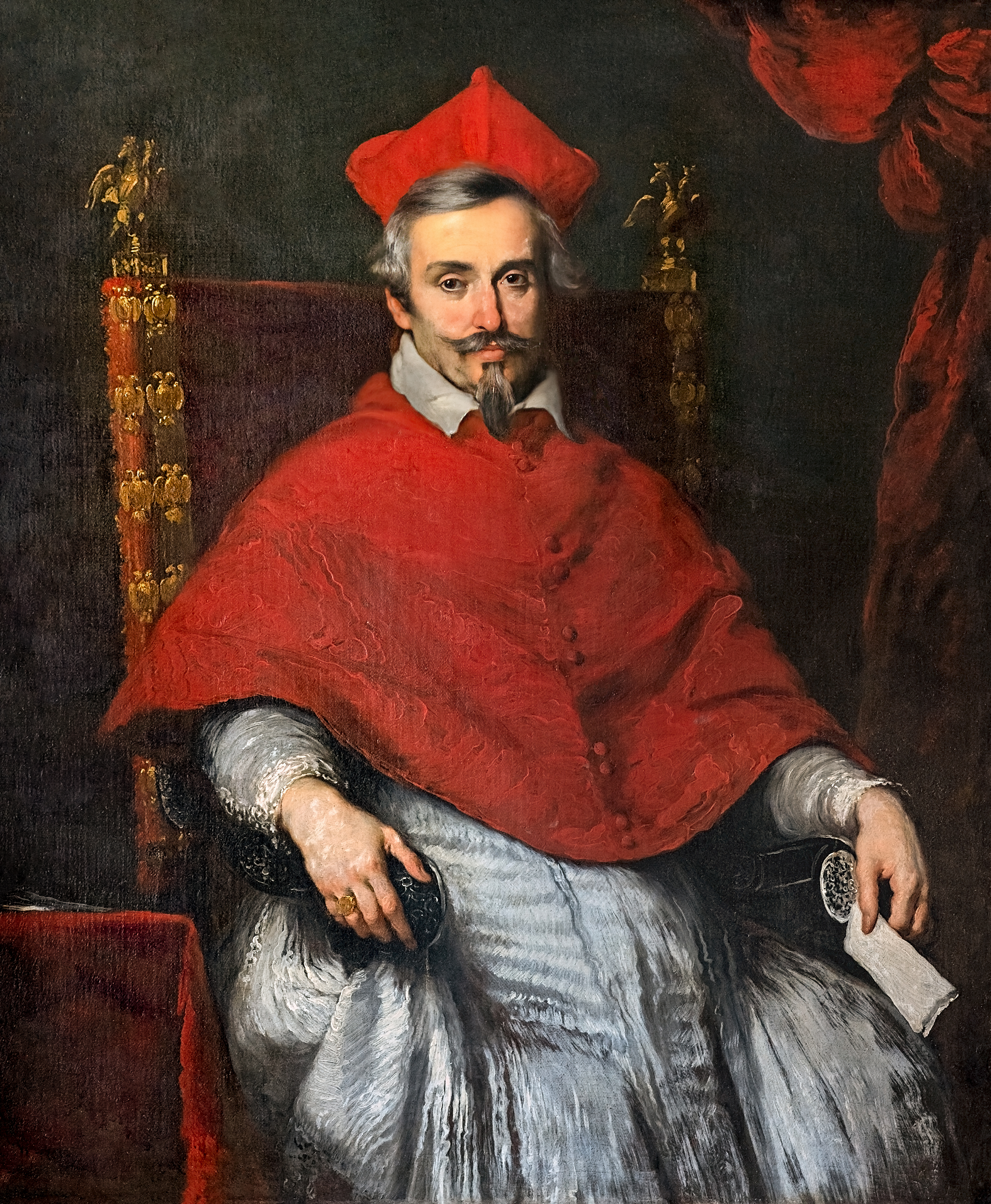
- Portrait by Bernardo Strozzi c. 1640
- Church: Roman Catholic
- Appointed: 29 April 1652
- Term ended: 5 June 1653

Orders
- Consecration: 9 April 1623 by Marcantonio Gozzadini
- Created cardinal: 19 January 1626 by Pope Urban VIII
- Rank: Cardinal-Bishop

Personal details
- Born: 16 November 1579 Venice, Republic of Venice
- Died: 5 June 1653 (aged 73) Rome, Papal States
- Buried: Santa Maria della Vittoria, Rome
- Parents: Giovanni I Cornaro; Chiara Delfino
- Education: University of Padua
- Coat of arms: Coat of arms of Cardinal Federico Baldissera Bartolomeo Corner

Federico Baldissera Bartolomeo Cornaro (16 November 1579 – 5 June 1653) was a Venetian Catholic Cardinal and Patriarch of Venice.

== Early life ==
Cornaro was born in Venice on 16 November 1579, the son of Doge Giovanni Cornaro and Chiara Delfino; he belonged to S. Paolo line of the House of Cornaro. He was the brother of Doge Francesco Cornaro. He started his education under the tutelage of his Cardinal uncle, until 1598 when his uncle died. Thereafter, he returned to Venice and studied at the University of Padua. In 1602, he went to Rome and became a cleric of the Apostolic Chamber under Pope Clement VIII. In 1607, he was appointed Governor of Civitavecchia.

== Ecclesiastic career ==
In February 1623, he was elected Bishop of Bergamo, but retained the clericate of the Apostolic Chamber, and was consecrated in April by Cardinal Marcantonio Gozzadini. Three years later, he was elevated to Cardinal by Pope Urban VIII and was installed as Cardinal-Priest of Santa Maria in Traspontina and appointed Bishop of Venice. His elevation was not without controversy as the Republic of Venice prohibited any son of a Doge from accepting a papal appointment. Eventually, the Venetian senate approved the promotion but refused to approve his proposed appointments as Bishop of Vicenza or Bishop of Padua.

Cornaro was appointed Cardinal-Priest of Santa Cecilia in Trastevere in 1627 and San Marco in 1629, before being promoted to Patriarch of Venice in June 1631, a position he held until 1644. In the intervening period, he was appointed Camerlengo of the Sacred College of Cardinals from 1639 to 1641.

== Later life and death ==
In 1644, he resigned his patriarchate and participated in the Papal conclave of 1644 which elected Pope Innocent X. In 1646, he became Cardinal-Priest of Santa Maria in Trastevere. In 1652, he opted for the order of bishops to become Cardinal-Bishop of Albano. Cornaro died on 5 June 1653 in Rome and was buried at the Cornaro Chapel in the church of Santa Maria della Vittoria.

Catholic Church titles
Preceded by Giovanni Emo	Bishop of Bergamo; 1623–1626	Succeeded by Agostino Priuli
Preceded by Ludovico Ludovisi	Cardinal-Priest of Santa Maria in Traspontina; 1626–1627	Succeeded by Cesare Monti
Preceded by Denis Delfino	Bishop of Vicenza; 1626–1629	Succeeded by Luca Stella
Preceded by Giambattista Leni	Cardinal-Priest of Santa Cecilia; 1627–1629	Succeeded by Giovanni Domenico Spinola
Preceded by Pietro Valier	Cardinal-Priest of San Marco; 1629–1646	Succeeded by Marcantonio Bragadin
Preceded by Pietro Valier	Bishop of Padua; 1629–1631	Succeeded by Marco Antonio Cornaro
Preceded by Giovanni Tiepolo	Patriarch of Venice; 1631–1644	Succeeded by Giovan Francesco Morosini
Preceded by Berlinghiero Gessi	Camerlengo of the Sacred College of Cardinals; 1639–1641	Succeeded by Giulio Cesare Sacchetti
Preceded by Antonio Marcello Barberini	Cardinal-Priest of Santa Maria in Trastevere; 1646–1652	Succeeded by Giulio Cesare Sacchetti
Preceded by Bernardino Spada	Cardinal-Bishop of Albano; 1652–1653	Succeeded by Marzio Ginetti
