= Giovanni Barozzi =

Italian prelate of the Catholic Church (1420–1466)

Cardinal Giovanni Barozzi
- Cardinal Patriarch of Venice
- Coat of arms of Giovanni Barozzi
- Church: Catholic Church
- In office: 1465–1466
- Previous posts: Bishop of Bergamo (1449–1465); Bishop of Cittanova (1465-1466); Patriarch of Venice (1465-1466)

Personal details
- Born: 1420 Venice
- Died: 2 April 1466 (aged 45–46) Venice

Giovanni Barozzi (1420 – 1466) was a prelate of the Catholic Church who served as Bishop of Bergamo (1449–1465) and Patriarch of Venice (1465–1466).

== Biography ==
On 5 Nov 1449, Giovanni Barozzi was appointed during the papacy of Pope Nicholas V as Bishop of Bergamo. On 7 Jan 1465, he was appointed during the papacy of Pope Paul II as Patriarch of Venice. He served as Patriarch of Venice until his death on 2 Apr 1466. He was a relative of Eugene IV and Paul II. Cousin of Paul II and Eugene IV the uncle. Created cardinal in pectore in 1464 or 1465, never published.

Catholic Church titles
| Preceded by Polidoro Foscari | Bishop of Bergamo; 1449–1465 | Succeeded by Ludovico Donato (bishop) |
| Preceded by Giorgio Correr | Patriarch of Venice; 1465–1466 | Succeeded by Maffeo Gherardi |
