= Miguel Rangel (bishop) =

Historical Roman Catholic prelate

Most Reverend Miguel Rangel
- Bishop of Angola e Congo
- Church: Catholic Church
- Diocese: Diocese of Angola e Congo
- In office: 1596–1602
- Predecessor: None
- Successor: Antonio de Santo Estevão

Orders
- Ordination: 1581
- Consecration: 1596 by Fabio Blondus de Montealto

Personal details
- Born: 1541 Coimbra, Portugal
- Died: 16 August 1602 (aged 60–61)

Miguel Rangel, OFMCap (1541 – 16 August 1602) was a Roman Catholic prelate who served as the first Bishop of Angola e Congo (1596–1602).

== Biography ==
Miguel Rangel was born in Coimbra, Portugal and ordained a priest in the Order of Friars Minor Capuchin in 1581. On 20 May 1596, he was appointed during the papacy of Pope Clement VIII as Bishop of Angola e Congo. In 1596, he was consecrated bishop by Fabio Blondus de Montealto, Titular Patriarch of Jerusalem. He served as Bishop of Angola e Congo until his death on 16 August 1602.

Catholic Church titles
Preceded by None	Bishop of Angola e Congo; 1596–1602	Succeeded by Antonio de Santo Estevão
