= Matteo Zane =

17th-century Roman Catholic patriarch

- Patriarch of Venice
- Church: Catholic Church
- Appointed: 27 August 1601
- Term ended: 25 July 1605
- Predecessor: Lorenzo Priuli
- Successor: Francesco Vendramin

Orders
- Ordination: 8 September 1601 by Agostino Valier
- Consecration: 28 Oct 1601 by Pope Clement VIII

Personal details
- Died: 27 July 1605

Matteo Zane (died 25 July 1605) was the Patriarch of Venice from 1600 to 1605.

== Biography ==
Prior to his election as Patriarch, Zane had served the government of Venice. He had been ambassador or holder of similar office to Urbino, Portugal, Spain, Austria and the Ottoman Empire. In the case of the Ottoman Empire he held the office of Bailo in Constantinople, which was considered the key position in the Venetian foreign service. He also supervised all other consuls of Venice throughout the Ottoman Empire and expanded the number of consuls under his direction from nine to ten.

Zane lacked the degree in either theology or canon law, mandated by the Council of Trent. Negotiations by Venice had this requirement waived and postponed Zane's examination on theology by the Pope and a panel of cardinals, as required of all Italian bishops until 1601. Zane was able to pass the examination at that time.

== Sources ==
- Mary Laven. Virgin's of Venice: Broken Vows and Cloistered Lives in the Renaissance Convent. New York: Penguin Books, 2002.
- "Patriarch Matteo Zane" Catholic-Hierarchy.org. David M. Cheney. Retrieved June 28, 2017
- Eric Dursteller. "The Bailo in Constantinople: Crisis and Career in Venice's Early Modern Diplomatic Corps" in Mediterranean Historical Review Vol. 16 (2001) p. 1-25.

Catholic Church titles
Preceded by Lorenzo Priuli	Patriarch of Venice; 1601–1605	Succeeded by Francesco Vendramin
