= Giacomo Monico =

His Eminence Giacomo Monico
- Patriarch of Venice
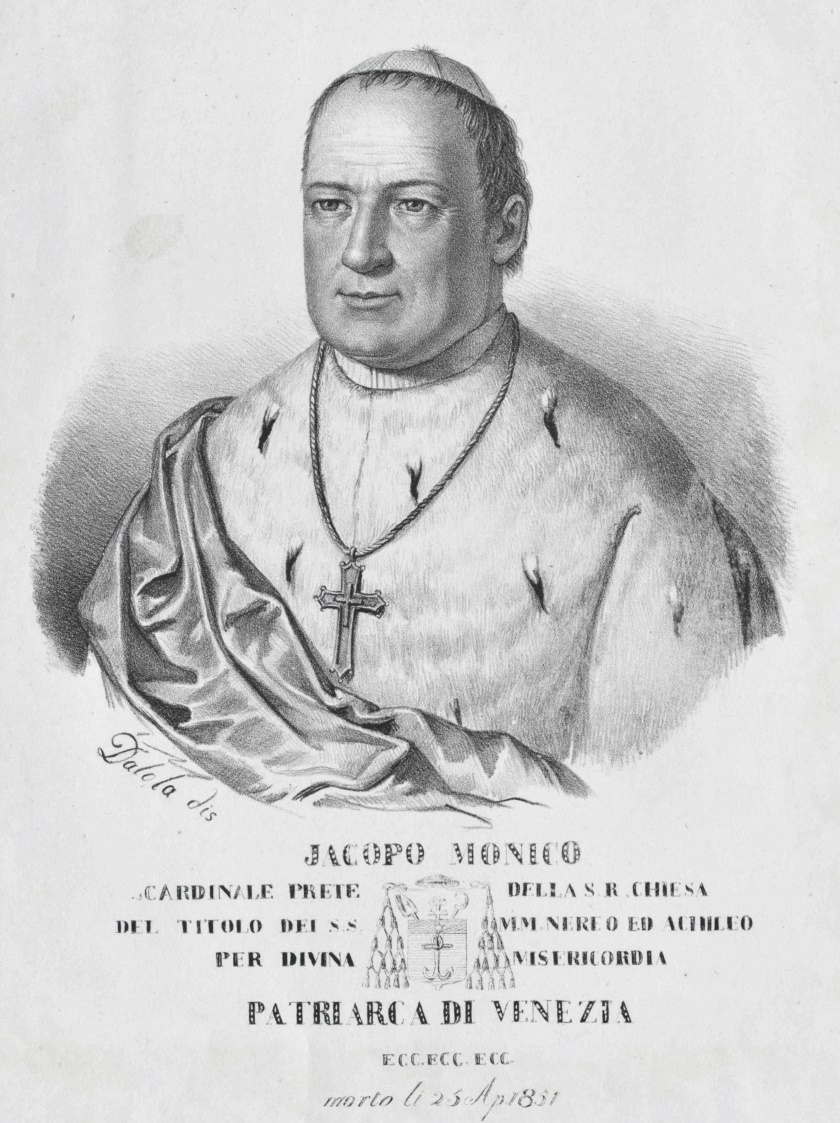
- Church: Roman Catholic Church
- Archdiocese: Venice
- See: Venice
- Appointed: 9 April 1827
- Installed: 8 September 1827
- Term ended: 25 April 1851
- Predecessor: Ladislaus Pyrker
- Successor: Pietro Antonio Mutti
- Other post: Cardinal-Priest of Santi Nereo ed Achilleo (1834-51)
- Previous post: Bishop of Ceneda (1823-27)

Orders
- Ordination: 21 March 1801 by Bernardino Marini
- Consecration: 9 November 1823 by Ján Krstitel Ladislav Pryker
- Created cardinal: 29 July 1833 by Pope Gregory XVI
- Rank: Cardinal-Priest

Personal details
- Born: Giacomo Monico; 26 June 1776 Riese, Republic of Venice
- Died: 25 April 1851 (aged 74) Venice, Kingdom of Lombardy–Venetia
- Buried: Saint Mark's Basilica
- Parents: Giambattista Monico; Antonia Cavallini

Styles of Giacomo Monico
- Reference style: His Eminence
- Spoken style: Your Eminence
- Informal style: Cardinal
- See: Venice

Giacomo Monico (1776–1851) was an Italian prelate who was named Patriarch of Venice in 1827 and Cardinal in 1833.

== Life ==
Born in Riese, he was educated in the seminary of the diocese of Treviso and ordained in 1801. He then taught at local seminary before being named parish pastor in Asolo. In 1823 he was appointed as bishop of Ceneda, now Vittorio Veneto. In 1827 he was named Patriarch of Venice. During his tenure as head of the diocese of Venice he was a strong supporter of the rule of the house of Habsburg, and after the defeat of the Republic of San Marco he presided over a solemn Te Deum in the Basilica of San Marco.

Although becoming a cardinal in 1833, he didn't participate in the conclave of 1846. He died in 1851.

Catholic Church titles
Preceded by Ladislaus Pyrker	Patriarch of Venice; 1827;1851	Succeeded by PierAurelio Mutti
