= Patriarch of Venice =

Italian Catholic bishop

- Archbishopric

catholic
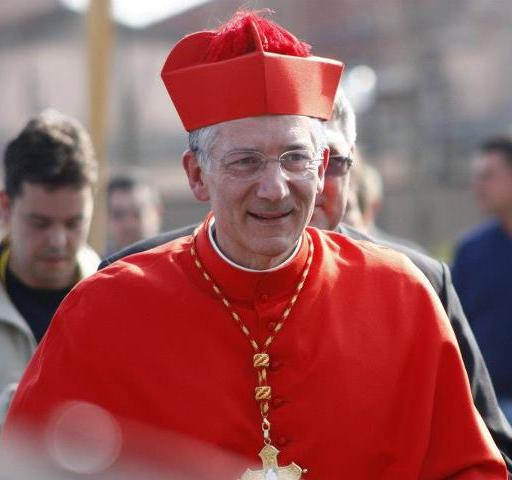
- Francesco Moraglia, the current Patriarch of Venice

- Coat of arms
- Incumbent; Francesco Moraglia

Location
- Ecclesiastical province: Patriarchate of Venice

Information
- First holder: Lawrence Giustiniani
- Established: 1451
- Diocese: Archdiocese of Venice
- Cathedral: Saint Mark's Basilica

Website
- www.patriarcatovenezia.it

The Patriarch of Venice (Latin: Patriarcha Venetiarum; Italian: Patriarca di Venezia) is the ordinary of the Patriarchate of Venice. The bishop is one of only four patriarchs in the Latin Rite of the Catholic Church. The other three are the Patriarch of Lisbon, the Patriarch of the East Indies and the Latin Patriarch of Jerusalem. Presently, the only advantage of this purely formal title is the bishop's place of honor in papal processions. In the case of Venice, an additional privilege allows the patriarch, even if he is not a cardinal, the use of the colour red in non-liturgical vestments. In that case, the red biretta is topped by a tuft, as is the custom with other bishops who are not cardinals.

The diocese of Castello (covering Venice) was created in 774 as suffragan of the Patriarchate of Grado. It was only in 1451 that, in consideration of the political influence of the city, its bishops were accorded the title of patriarch by the pope.

By a relatively recent tradition, the Patriarch of Venice is created a cardinal at the consistory following his appointment, though nothing requires the pope to do so. The current patriarch Francesco Moraglia has not been made a cardinal.

In the last centuries of the Republic of Venice (to 1797), exceptionally among Catholic bishops, the patriarch was elected by the Venetian Senate, who always chose a member of one of the hereditary patrician families of the city, and usually a layman who was only ordained to take up the patriarchate. The papacy obliged them to pass an examination in theology, though many evaded this. Usually the new patriarch was a Venetian diplomat or administrator, as with Lorenzo Priuli in 1591 or Francesco Vendramin in 1608, though some were career clerics, who had usually been previously in positions in Rome, such as Federico Cornaro in 1631. The patriarchs normally remained in Venice, and in this period none were elected pope. Since the end of the republic, patriarchs have rarely been of Venetian origin, and three of them became pope in the 20th century alone: Pius X (1903), John XXIII (1958) and John Paul I (1978).

== Ecclesiastical history ==
=== Early history ===
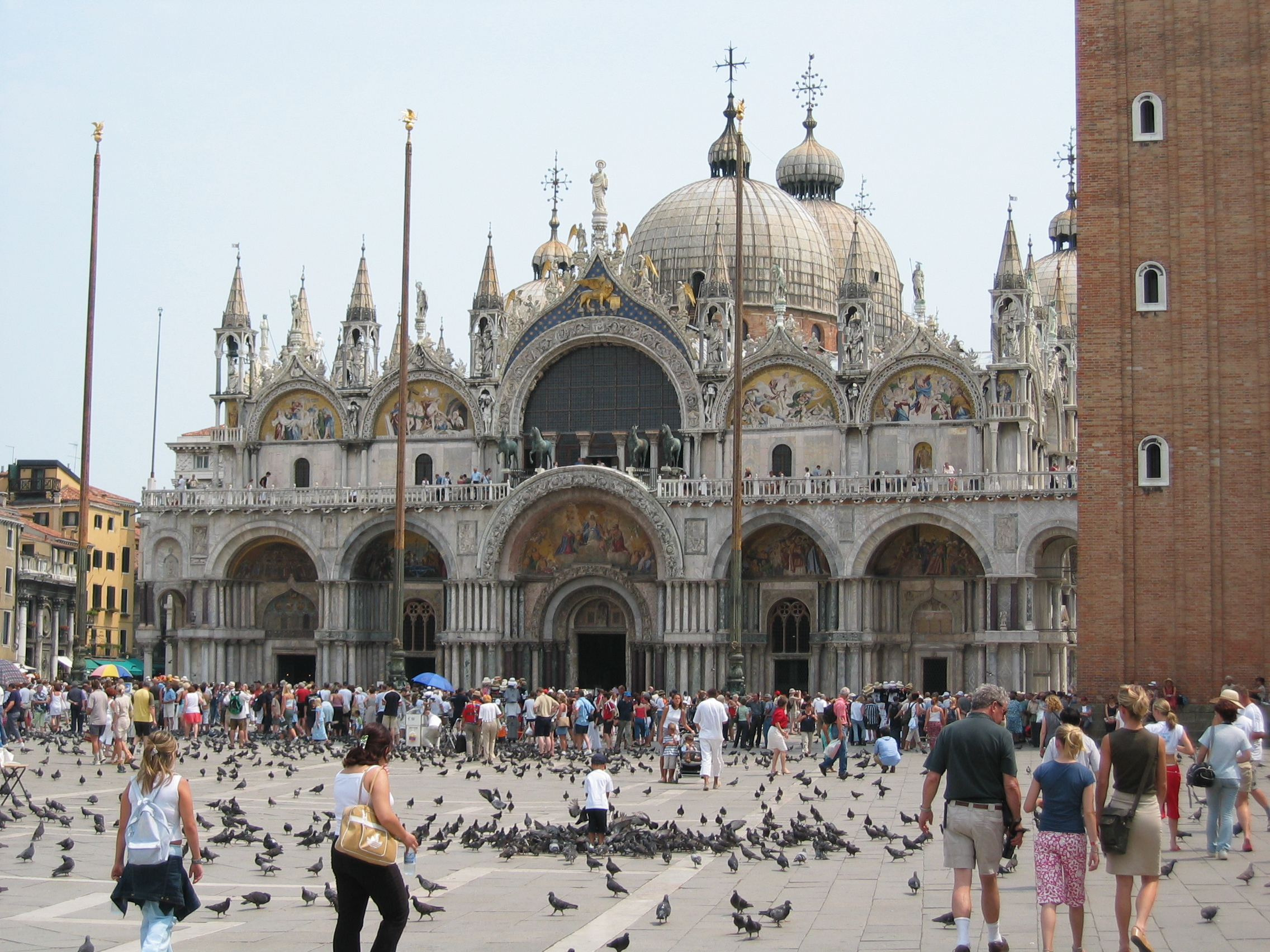
Saint Mark's Basilica, the Cathedral of the Patriarch of Venice.

The Venetian islands at first belonged to the diocese of Altino or of Padua, under jurisdiction of the archbishop of Aquileia, believed to be the successor of St. Mark. During the Lombard invasion (568–572) many bishops of the invaded mainland escaped under protection of the Byzantine fleet in the eastern lagoons. The archbishop himself took refuge in Grado, where he was claimed as patriarch, during the schism of the Three Chapters. At the end of the invasion, many of the ancient dioceses of the mainland were restored by the Lombards, while the exiles supported the new sees in the lagoons. Two patriarchs emerged: the Patriarchate of Old Aquileia on the mainland and Patriarchate of Grado.

In 774 or 775, Pope Adrian I and John IV, Patriarch of Grado, authorized the establishment of an episcopal see on the island of Olivolo. The first bishop, Obelerius, was nominated, invested and enthroned by the doge and consecrated by the patriarch. The Bishop of Olivolo was subordinate to Grado and had jurisdiction over the islands of Olivolo, Rialto, Luprio, Gemini, Scopulo or Dorsoduro, Spinalonga, Biria and other minor islands of the central group. The diocese's cathedral was San Pietro di Castello.

In 828 the body of Saint Mark the Evangelist was smuggled from Alexandria, Egypt, to Venice. When the ship reached Olivolo island in Venice, the saint made signs (or so it was claimed) showing he did not want to be placed in the custody of the bishop. Instead, he was taken to the doge's chapel, and planning began to create a magnificent new temple, St Mark's Basilica, suitable for such important relics. The legend that St. Mark himself had preached the Gospel at Venice grew up in later times.

In 1074, the Bishop of Olivolo began to be styled the Bishop of Castello. Enrico Contarini was the first to hold this title. In 1084 the Emperor Alexios I Komnenos in his Golden Bull recognized the full independence of Venice, along with freedom from tributes, trade restrictions and customs duties.

The Republic of Venice began its Golden Age under the Doge Enrico Dandolo (1192–1205). Under him the French Crusading army of the Fourth Crusade was used to bring Trieste and Zara under Venetian sway, and then to obtain a large part of the Latin Empire of Constantinople along the east coast of the Adriatic, most of the Peloponnesus and settlements in the Sea of Marmora, the Black Sea and the Aegean.

The relationship between the bishop, the patriarch and the doge was complex. The bishops of Olivolo, and then Castello, were technically suffragans of the Patriarch of Grado. In practice they maintained independence. From the middle of the 11th century the patriarchs took up residence for most of the time at San Silvestro, Venice, while the bishop was based at San Pietro on the east of the city. An important role was played by the primicerio, based in Saint Mark's, who represented the doge and the city government. The primicerio invested the bishops, abbots and patriarchs.

=== Patriarchate's history ===
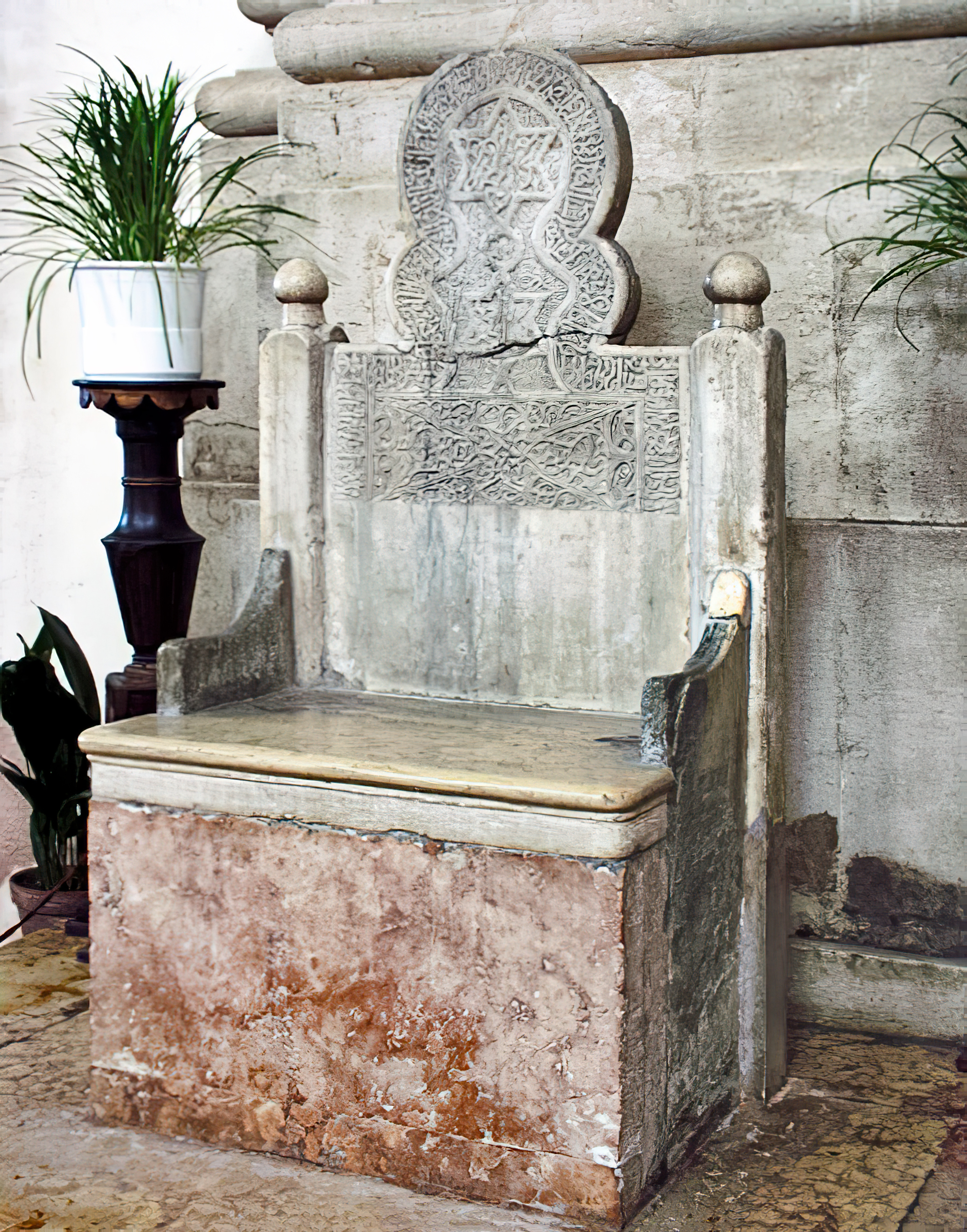
Saint Peter's Chair, the oldest throne of the diocese of Venice in the co-cathedral of Saint Peter of Castello. It is likely an ancient Muslim gravestone transported from Antioch by merchants.

In 1451, upon the death of Domenico Michel, Patriarch of Grado, Pope Nicholas V suppressed the Patriarchate of Grado and the Diocese of Castello, incorporating them both in the new Patriarchate of Venice by the Papal Bull "Regis aeterni." Thus Venice succeeded to the whole metropolitan jurisdiction of Grado's ecclesiastical province, including the sees of Dalmatia.

In 1466 the territory of the Patriarchate was expanded by merging the suppressed Diocese of Equilio.

The election of the patriarch belonged to the Senate of Venice, and this practice sometimes led to differences between the republic and the Holy See. Likewise, parishioners elected their parish priests, by the right of patronage. Girolamo Quirini, OP (1519–54), had many disputes with the clergy, the Government, and the Holy See. To avoid these disputes, the Senate decreed that in future only senators should be eligible. Those elected after this were frequently laymen. Giovanni Trevisan, OSB (1560), introduced the Tridentine reforms, founding the seminary, holding synods and collecting the regulations made by his predecessors (Constitutiones et privilegia patriarchatus et cleri Venetiarum). In 1581 the visita Apostolica was sent to Venice; a libellus exhortatorius was published, in which the visita highly praised the clergy of Venice.

In 1751, Pope Benedict XIV abolished the Patriarchate of Aquileia by creating two new archbishops in Udine and Gorizia. With this act the Patriarchate of Venice became sole heir to the throne of St. Mark in northeastern Italy.

After 1797 and the fall of the Republic of Venice under the rule of Napoleon, the bishopric rule of the doge on the Basilica and St. Mark's relics was lacking. Then in 1807, by favor of the Viceroy of Italy, the Neapolitan Nicola Gambroni was promoted to the Patriarchate and of his own authority transferred the patriarchal seat to the Basilica of St. Mark, uniting the two chapters. He also reduced the number of parish churches from seventy to thirty. The work of enlarging the choir of the basilica brought to light the relics of St. Mark in 1808. In 1811 Napoleon intruded into the See of Venice Stefano Bonsignore, Bishop of Faenza, but in 1814 that prelate returned to his own see.

In 1819 the Diocese of Torcello and Diocese of Caorle were merged in the Patriarchate of Venice, while the dioceses of the Venetian territory were placed under its metropolitan jurisdiction. Cardinal Giuseppe Sarto, afterwards Pius X, succeeded in 1893; he was refused recognition by the Italian Government, which claimed the right of nomination formerly employed by the Habsburg Emperor of Austria and in earlier times by the Venetian Senate, but after eleven months this pretension was abandoned.

During the twentieth century three patriarchs of Venice achieved election as pope: Giuseppe Melchiorre Sarto, elected Pope Pius X in 1903; Angelo Giuseppe Roncalli, elected Pope John XXIII in 1958; and Albino Luciani, elected Pope John Paul I in 1978.

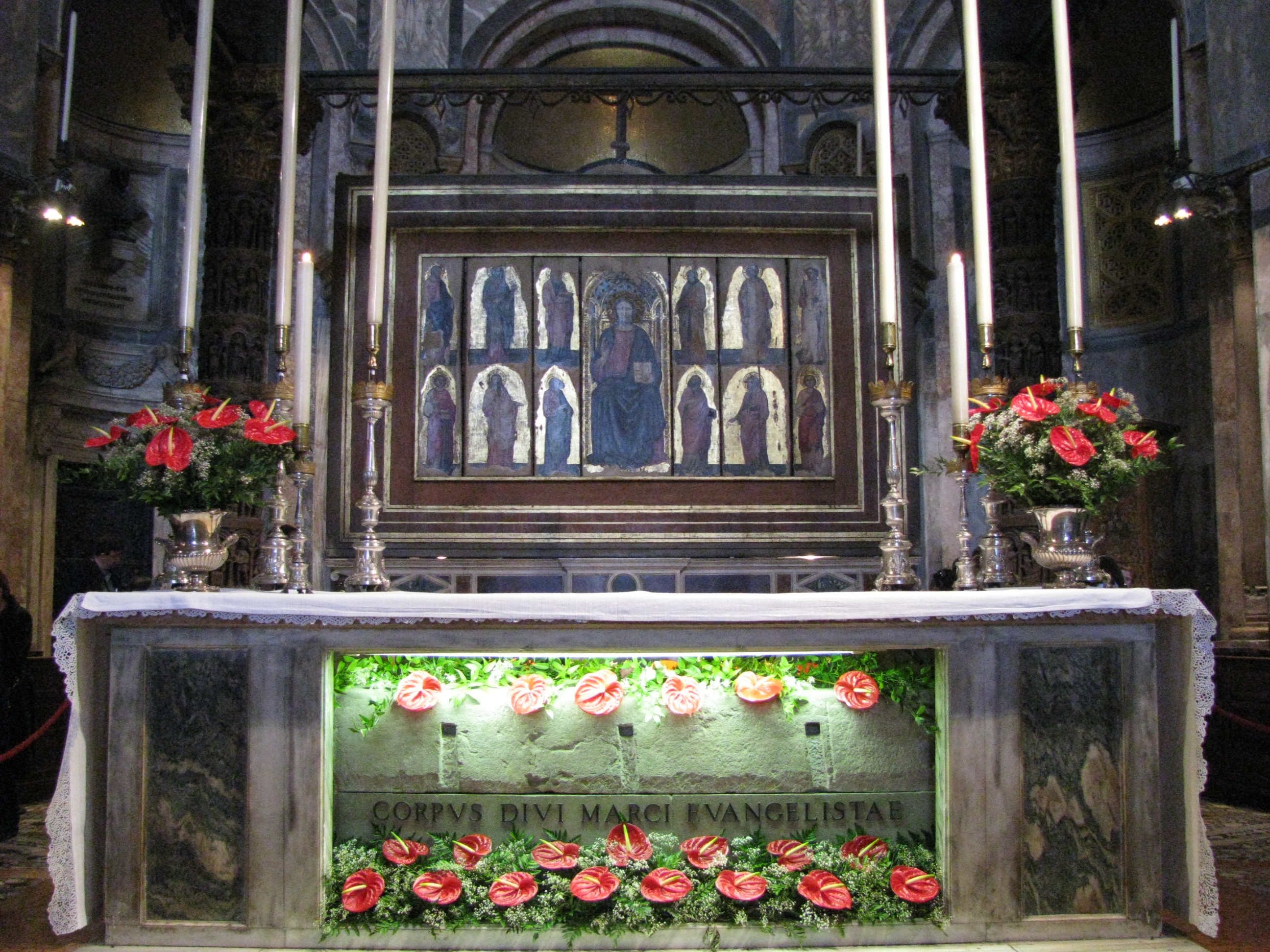
Saint Mark's Basilica, the main altar: it retains inside the body of the Apostle St. Mark the Evangelist.

== List of Patriarchs of Venice ==
- Saint Lawrence Giustiniani (1451–1456)
- Maffio Contarini (1456–1460)
- Andrea Bondimerio, OSA (1460–1464)
- Gregorio Correr (1464)
- Giovanni Barozzi (1465–1466)
- Cardinal Maffeo Gherardi, OSB (1466–1492)
- Tomaso Dona (1492–1504)
- Antonio Surian (1504–1508)
- Alvise Contarini (1508)
- Antonio Contarini (1508–1524)
- Girolamo Quirino (1524–1554)
- Pietro Francesco Contarini (1554–1555)
- Vincenzo Diedo (1556–1559)
- Giovanni Trevisan (1560–1590)
- Cardinal Lorenzo Priuli (cardinal) (1591–1600)
- Matteo Zane (1600–1605)
- Cardinal Francesco Vendramin (1605/1608–1619)
- Giovanni Tiepolo (1619–1631)
- Cardinal Federico Baldissera Bartolomeo Cornaro (1631–1644)
- Giovan Francesco Morosini (1644–1678)
- Alvise Sagredo (1678–1688)
- Cardinal Giovanni Alberto Badoer (1688–1706)
- Piero Barbarigo (1706–1725)
- Marco Gradenigo (1725–1734)
- Francesco Antonio Correr, OFMCap (1734–1741)
- Aloysius Foscari (1741–1758)
- Giovanni Bragadin (1758–1775)
- Federico Maria Giovanelli (1776–1800)
- Cardinal Ludovico Flangini Giovanelli (1801–1804)
- Nicolò Saverio Gamboni (1807–1808)
- Francesco Milesi (1815–1819)
- Ján Ladislaus Pyrker, OCist (1820–1827)
- Cardinal Giacomo Monico (1827–1851)
- PierAurelio Mutti, OSB (1852–1857)
- Angelo Ramazzotti (1858–1861)
- Cardinal Giuseppe Luigi Trevisanato (1862–1877)
- Cardinal Domenico Agostini (1877–1891)
- Saint Cardinal Giuseppe Melchiorre Sarto (1893–1903), elected Pope Pius X
- Cardinal Aristide Cavallari (1904–1914)
- Cardinal Pietro La Fontaine (1915–1935)
- Cardinal Adeodato Giovanni Piazza, OCD (1936–1948), appointed Prefect of the Congregation for Bishops
- Carlo Agostini (1948–1952), was to have become Cardinal in 1953
- Saint Cardinal Angelo Giuseppe Roncalli (1953–1958), elected Pope John XXIII
- Cardinal Giovanni Urbani (1958–1969)
- Blessed Cardinal Albino Luciani (1969–1978), elected Pope John Paul I
- Cardinal Marco Cé (1979–2002)
- Cardinal Angelo Scola (2002–2011), appointed Archbishop of Milan
- Francesco Moraglia (2012–)

== See also ==
- Studium Generale Marcianum

== Sources ==
- Ferraro, Joanne M. (2001). Marriage Wars in Late Renaissance Venice. Oxford University Press. ISBN 978-0-19-803311-0.
- Nicol, Donald M. (1992). Byzantium and Venice: A Study in Diplomatic and Cultural Relations. Cambridge University Press. ISBN 978-0-521-42894-1.
- Romano, Dennis (2013). "Venetian exceptionalism?". Churchmen and Urban Government in Late Medieval Italy, c. 1200–c. 1450: Cases and Contexts. Cambridge University Press. ISBN 978-1-107-04426-5.
- Sethre, Janet (2003). The Souls of Venice. McFarland. ISBN 978-0-7864-1573-1.
- Orsoni, Alessandro (1828). Cronologia storica dei Vescovi Olivolensi detti dappoi Castellani e successivi Patriarchi di Venezia. Gaspari.
- Ross, Kelley L. (2012). "Patriarchs of Aquileia, Grado, and Venice".
- GCatholic.org
