= San Pietro di Castello (church) =

Roman Catholic minor basilica of the Patriarch of Venice

Basilica di San Pietro di Castello Basilica of St Peter of Castello
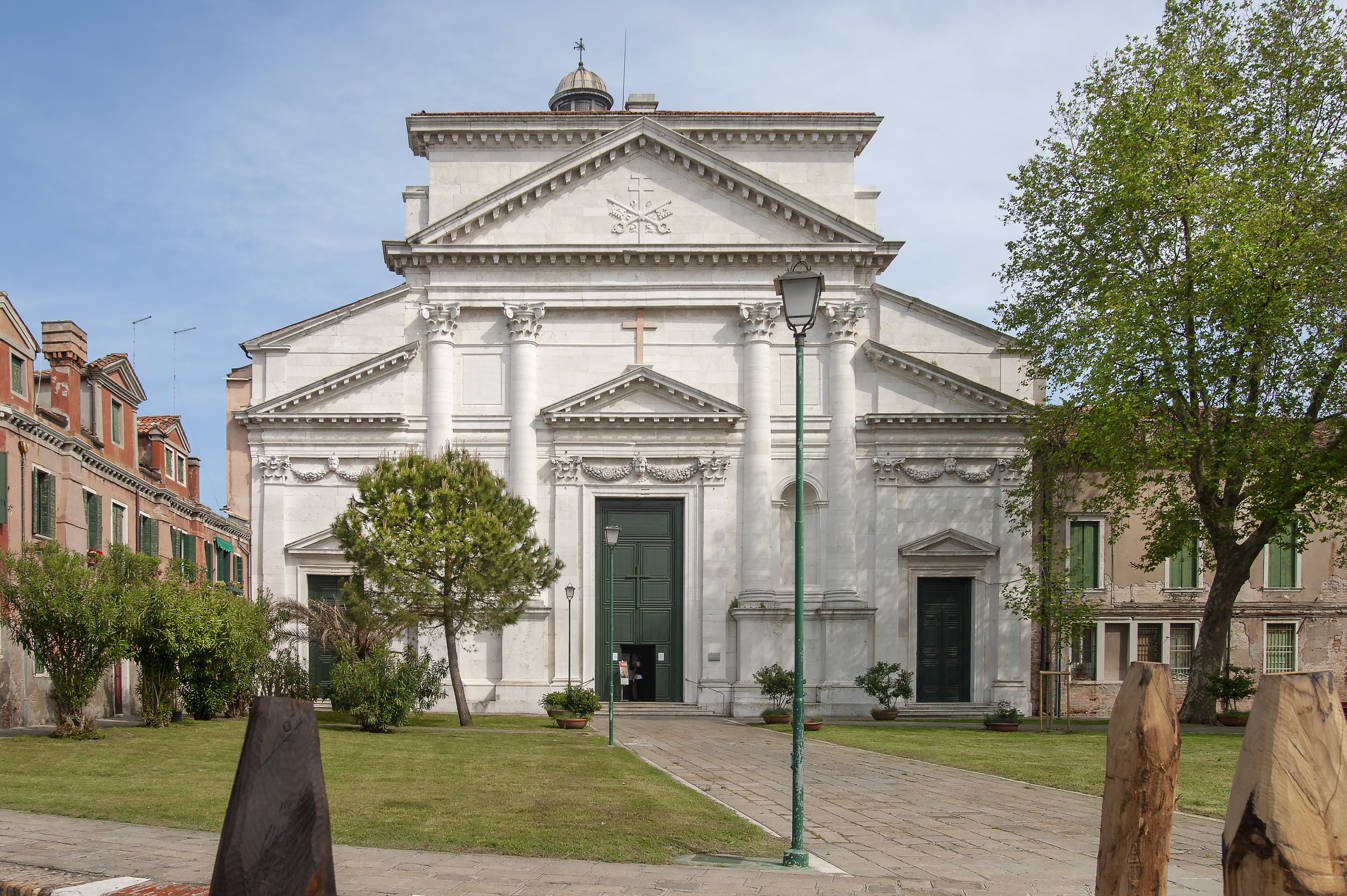
- The facade of San Pietro di Castello

Religion
- Affiliation: Roman Catholic
- Ecclesiastical or organisational status: minor basilica, parish church
- Status: Active

Location
- Location: Venice, Italy
- Interactive map of Basilica di San Pietro di Castello; Basilica of St Peter of Castello
- Coordinates: 45°26′4.37″N 12°21′35.47″E

Architecture
- Architects: Francesco Smeraldi, Andrea Palladio (design)
- Type: Church
- Groundbreaking: 7th century
- Completed: 16th century

Specifications
- Direction of façade: WNW
- Length: 75 metres (246 ft)
- Width: 35 metres (115 ft)
- Width (nave): 16 metres (52 ft)

Website
- www.patriarcatovenezia.it

The Basilica di San Pietro di Castello (English: Basilica of St Peter of Castello), commonly called San Pietro di Castello, is a Roman Catholic minor basilica of the Patriarch of Venice located in the Castello sestiere of the Italian city of Venice. The present building dates from the 16th century, but a church has stood on the site since at least the 7th century. From 1451 to 1807, it was the city's cathedral church, though hardly playing the usual dominant role of a cathedral, as it was overshadowed by the "state church" of San Marco and inconveniently located. During its history, the church has undergone a number of alterations and additions by some of Venice's most prominent architects. Andrea Palladio received his first commission in the city of Venice from the Patriarch Vincenzo Diedo to rebuild the facade and interior of St Pietro, but Diedo's death delayed the project.

After St Mark's Basilica became Venice's official cathedral (it had previously been the private church of the Doge), San Pietro fell into a state of disrepair. It was firebombed during the First World War and only through the efforts of conservation organisations has it been restored to its former state. Its ongoing conservation is now managed through its membership of the Chorus Association of Venetian churches.

The church is located on San Pietro di Castello (from which it derives its name), a small island off the eastern end of the main city of Venice.

== History ==
The earliest structure on the site dates from the 7th century. It was one of the eight churches founded by St. Magnus (Italian: San Magno), the Bishop of Oderzo, who came to the Venetian lagoon during this period. At the time there was no city but simply a collection of small communities scattered throughout the marshy islands. In a vision St. Peter (Italian: San Pietro) appeared to Magnus and instructed him to found a church where he saw oxen and sheep grazing side by side. The location was found and St. Magnus built the church, dedicating it to St. Peter.

The first Bishop of Olivolo was Obelarius (774/6–798) In 1120 a fire destroyed the church requiring a new structure to be built. This was grander than the previous building (as seen on a map drawn by Jacopo de' Barbari in 1500) and had an adjoining baptistery dedicated to St. John the Baptist (since destroyed). In 1451, and despite being some distance from the political and economic centre of the city, San Pietro became the seat of the Patriarch of Venice. Following this the building began to see significant investment. During the 1480s Mauro Codussi rebuilt the church's campanile using white Istrian stone, the first example of this seen in Venice. Between 1508 and 1524 the Patriarch Antonio Contarini restored the floors and ceiling. At the same time minor chapels were re-built and the church was decorated with new furnishings.

In 1558 Andrea Palladio, in his first commission in the city of Venice, prepared an improved design for the facade and interior of San Pietro. However, the Patriarch who had commissioned Palladio, Vincenzo Diedo, died before the plans could be implemented. Later, between 1594 and 1596 the architect Francesco Smeraldi implemented a modified and less ambitious version of Palladio's original design, the changes possibly attributable to a lack of funds.

In 1807 St Mark's Basilica became Venice's official cathedral church instead of San Pietro. After 1807 the church saw increased neglect and suffered from firebomb damage during First World War. It wasn't until conservation organisations intervened during the 1970s that the church was restored to its former condition. The church itself is a member of the Chorus Association of Venetian Churches.

== Exterior ==
The church exhibits a muted facade compared to other Palladian designs in Venice. It features a prominent set of four engaged columns with Composite capitals supporting the main pediment and entablature. This is then flanked by a double broken pediment.

The church has a large dome which indicates the church's ecclesiastical importance, sharing an affinity with San Giorgio Maggiore and Il Redentore both churches designed by Palladio. The dome is supported on a drum which has rectangular windows cut into it to let light into the building.

The church's campanile is one of the most precarious in Venice.

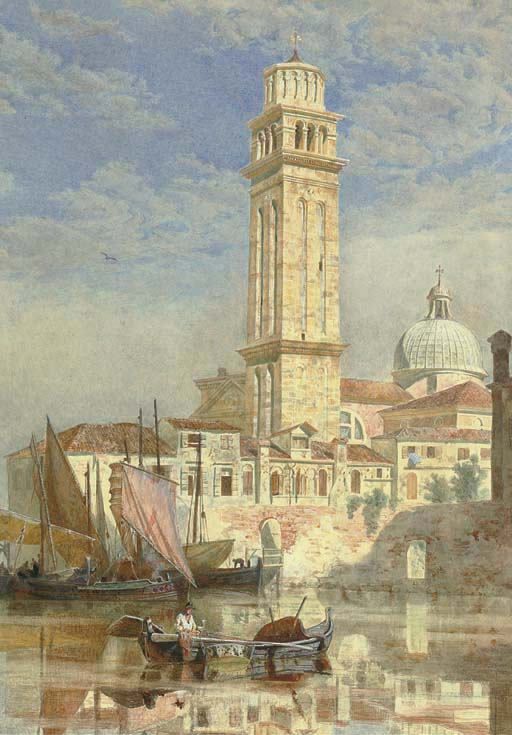
Church of San Pietro di Castello, by Edward Angelo Goodall (1819–1908)

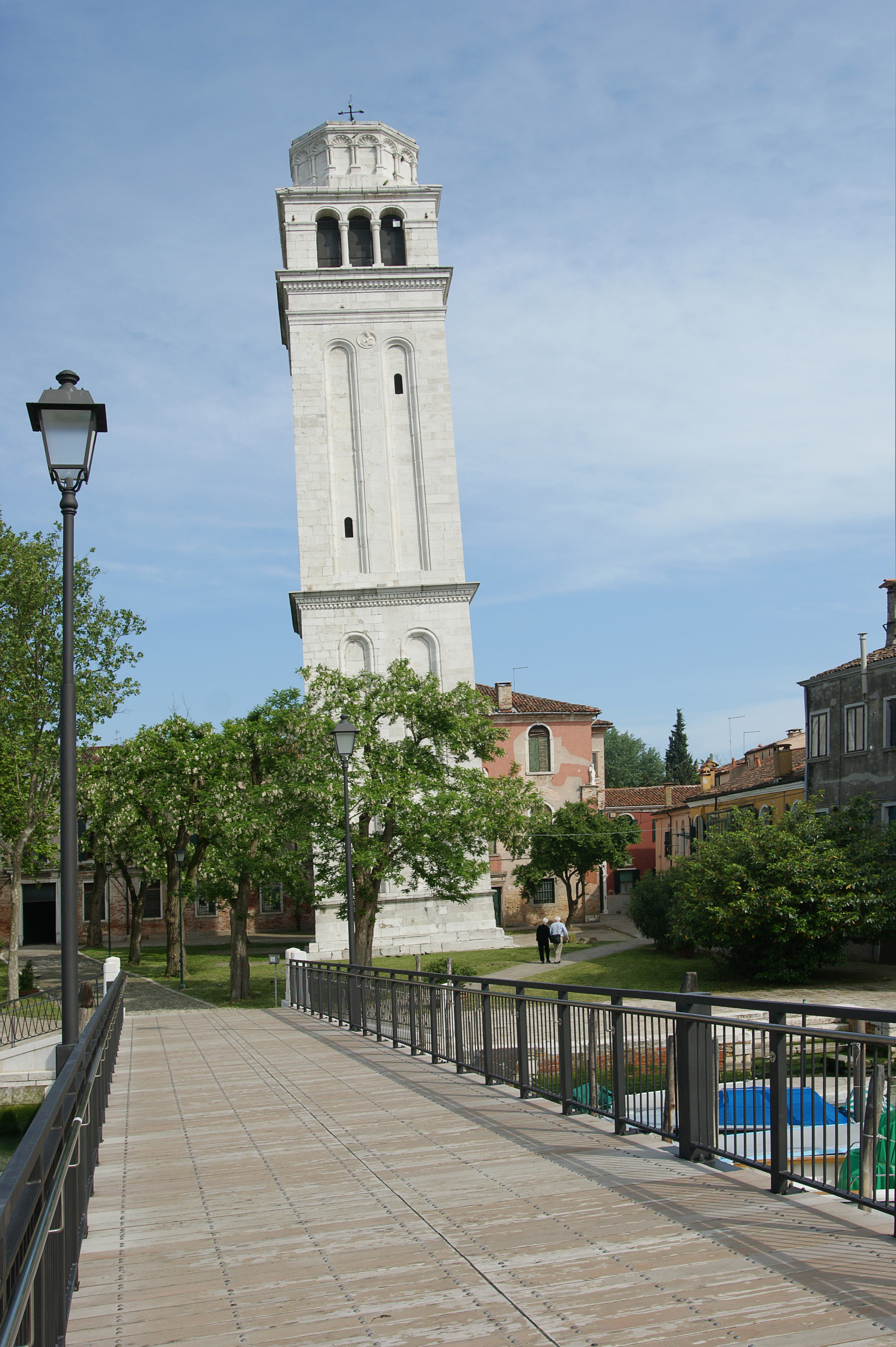
Bell tower

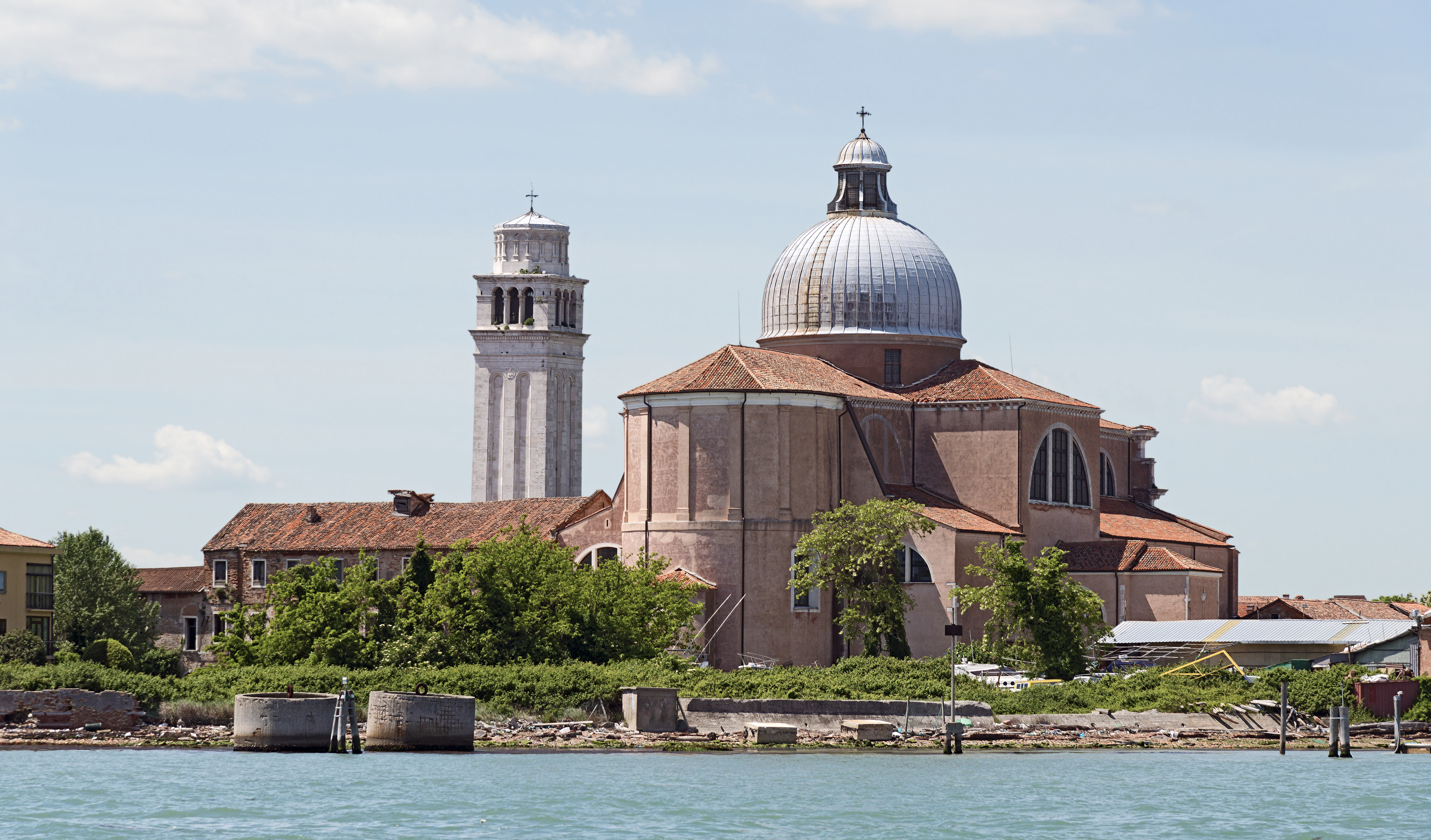
The basilica view from the lagoon.

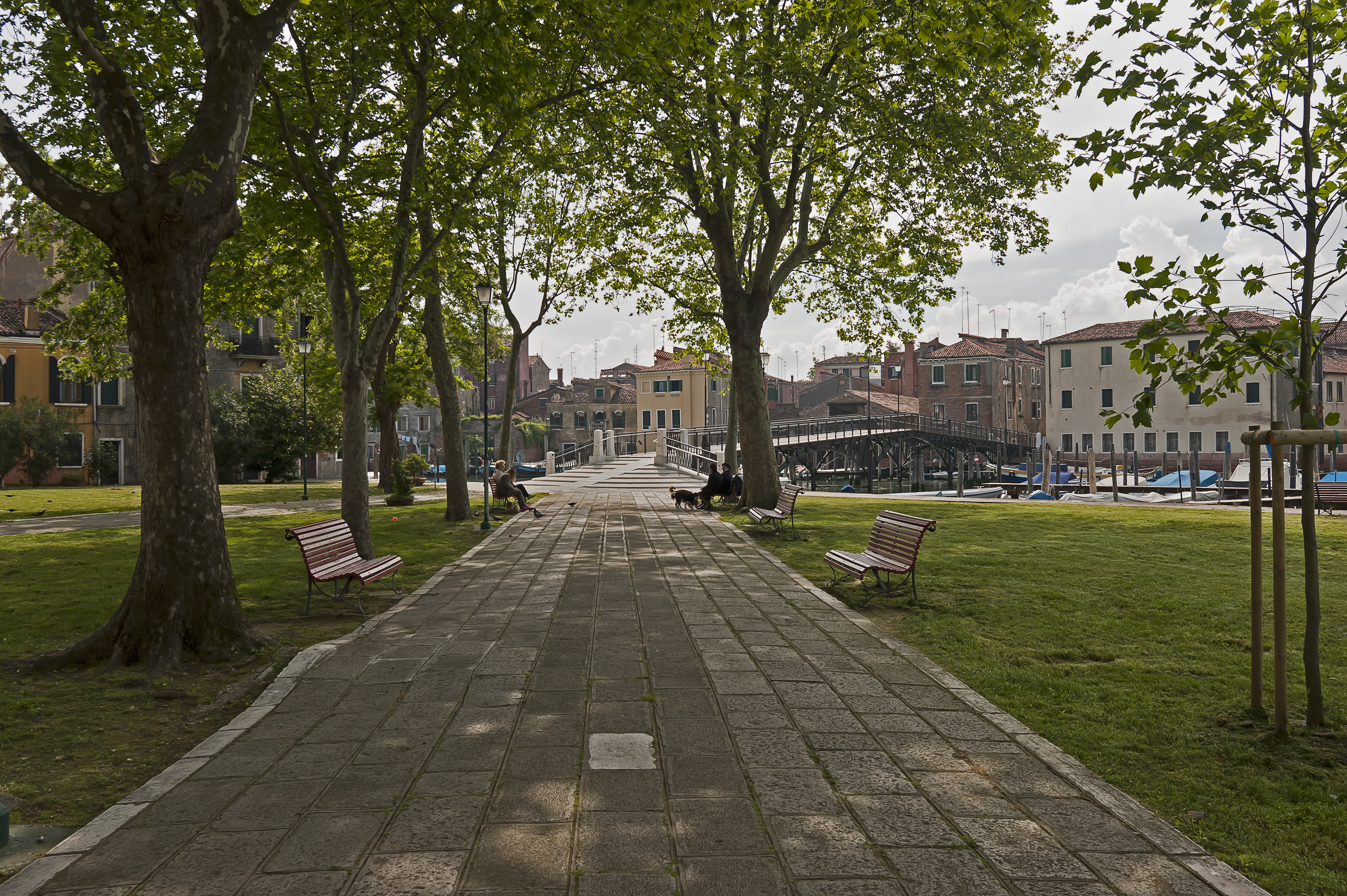
Campo San Pietro.

== Interior ==
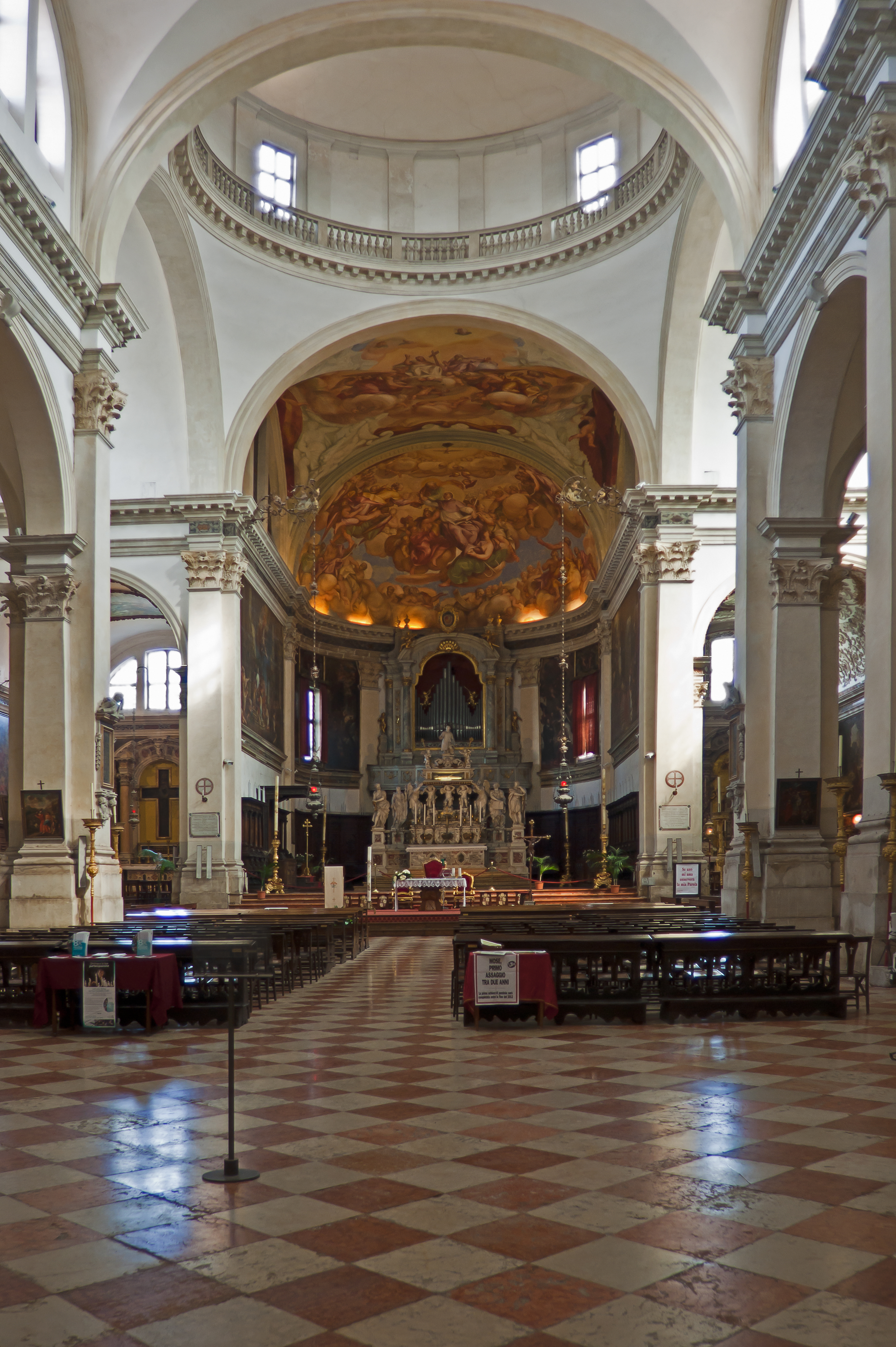
Interior

The building has a large central nave with Latin aisles. The transept crosses the church, separating the nave from the presbytery. The crossing point is capped by a large dome. The Vendramin Chapel, located off the left aisle, was designed by the baroque architect Baldassarre Longhena, as was the high altar which he constructed during the middle of the 17th century. The organ was constructed by the Dalmatian craftsman Pietro Nachini who was working in Venice during the 18th century.

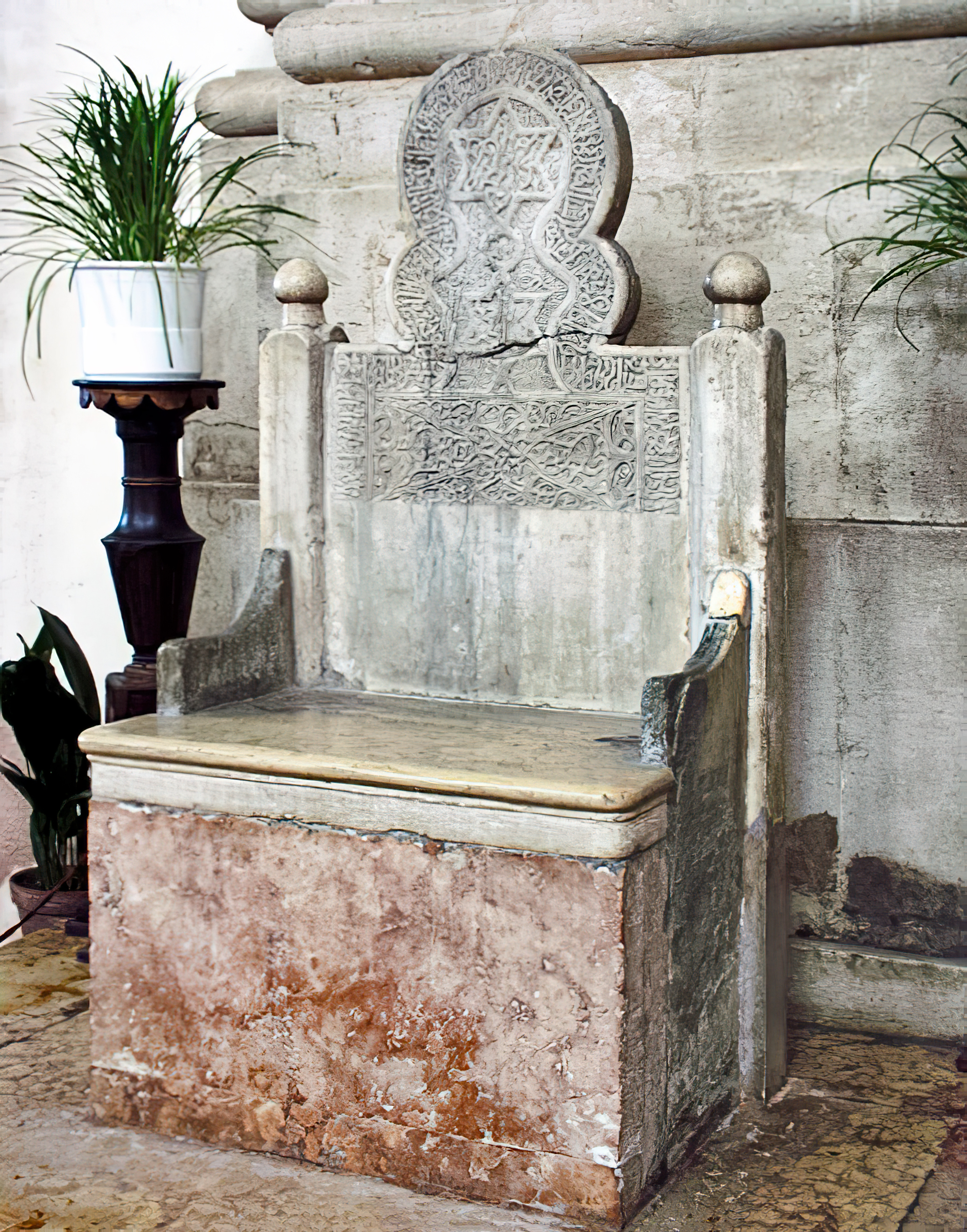
Throne of St Peter

=== Artwork ===
The church contains only a few notable works of art including SS John the Evangelist, Peter and Paul by Paolo Veronese and the altarpiece in the Vendramin Chapel by Luca Giordano. The church also contains the Throne of St Peter, a 13th-century seat cut from a funeral stone.

== See also ==
- 17th-century Western domes

== Sources ==
- Weissmüller, Alberto (2005). Palladio in Venice. Grafiche Vianello Srl. p. 168. ISBN 88-7200-174-9.
