= Patriarchate of Venice =

Catholic patriarchate in Italy

Coordinates: 45°26′04″N 12°20′23″E

Patriarchate of Venice Patriarchatus Venetiarum Patriarcato di Venezia

Catholic
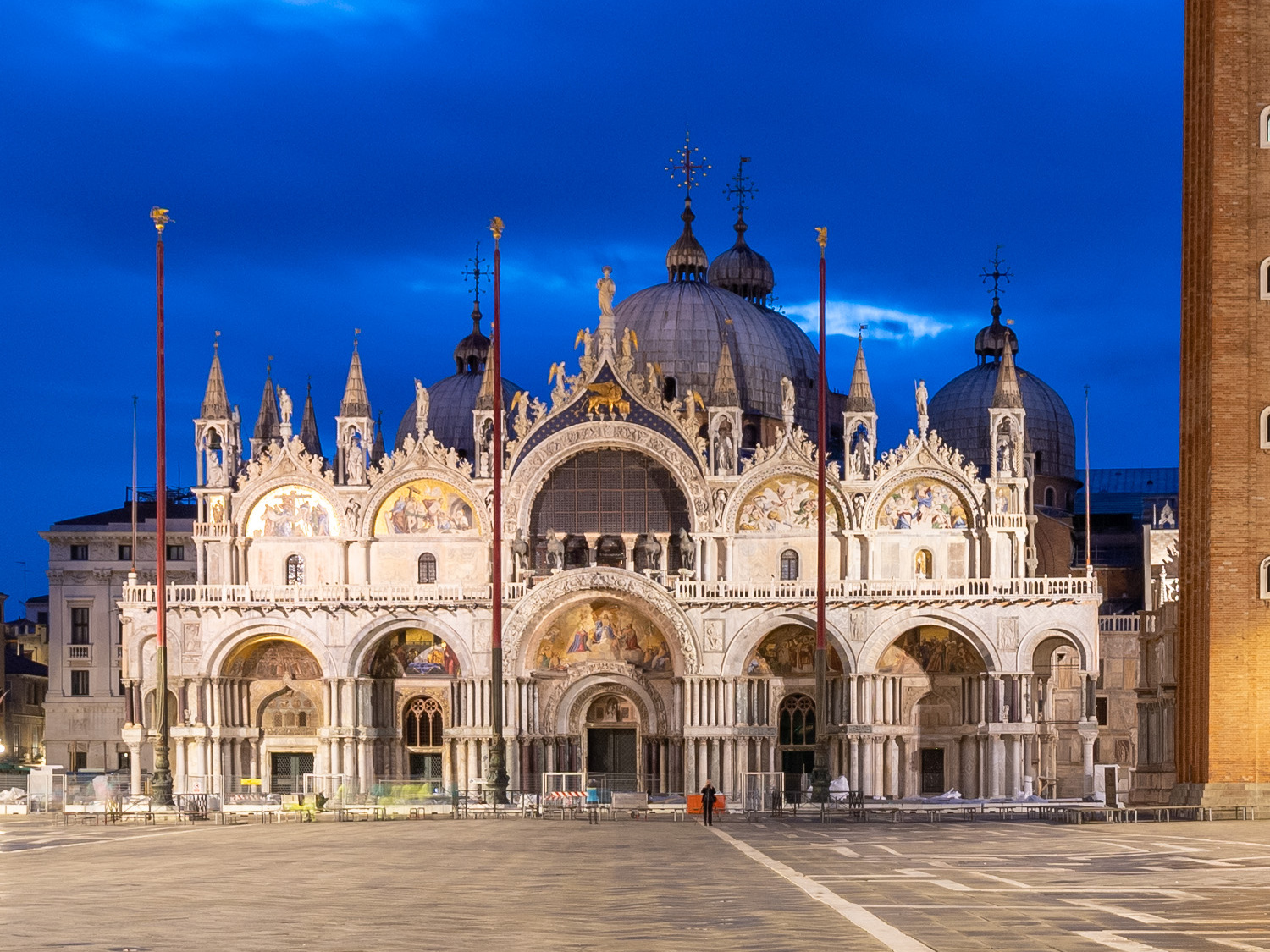
- St. Mark's Basilica, Venice

Location
- Country: Italy
- Ecclesiastical province: Venice

Statistics
- Area: 871 km^{2} (336 sq mi)
- Population: Total; Catholics: (as of 2015); 384,469; 327,000 (85.1%)
- Parishes: 128

Information
- Denomination: Catholic Church
- Rite: Roman Rite
- Established: 774
- Cathedral: Patriarchal Cathedral Basilica of Saint Mark

Current leadership
- Pope: Leo XIV
- Patriarch: Francesco Moraglia

Map

Website
- www.patriarcatovenezia.it

The Patriarchate of Venice (Italian: Patriarcato di Venezia; Latin: Patriarchatus Venetiarum), also sometimes called the Archdiocese of Venice, is a patriarchate of the Latin Church of the Catholic Church, located in the Metropolitan City of Venice. Its episcopal seat is in the Cathedral Basilica of St. Mark in Venice.

One of only four extant patriarchates in the Latin Church of the Catholic Church, its ordinary is the Patriarch of Venice, who is traditionally created a cardinal by the pope. Immediately upon installation in office, however, the Patriarch of Venice has the right to wear scarlet vesture (like a cardinal), whether or not he has yet been elevated to the College of Cardinals.

As a metropolitan, the Patriarch of Venice is the metropolitan of the Ecclesiastical Province of Venice. Its suffragan dioceses include Adria-Rovigo, Belluno-Feltre, Chioggia, Concordia-Pordenone, Padova, Treviso, Verona, Vicenza, and Vittorio Veneto.

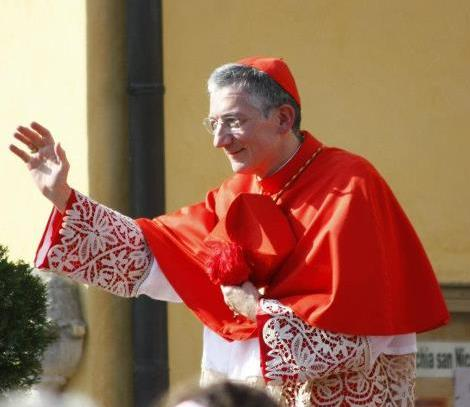
Archbishop Francesco Moraglia (incumbent) wearing the Patriarch's scarlet vestments, similar to that of a cardinal.

In 1451 the Patriarchate of Grado was merged with the Bishopric of Castello and Venice to form the Patriarchate of Venice.

== Books ==
=== Reference works ===
- Eubel, Conradus, ed. (1913). Hierarchia catholica, Tomus 1 (second ed.). Münster: Libreria Regensbergiana. (in Latin)
- Eubel, Conradus, ed. (1914). Hierarchia catholica, Tomus 2 (second ed.). Münster: Libreria Regensbergiana. (in Latin)
- Eubel, Conradus, ed. (1923). Hierarchia catholica, Tomus 3 (second ed.). Münster: Libreria Regensbergiana.
- Gams, Pius Bonifatius (1873). Series episcoporum Ecclesiae catholicae: quotquot innotuerunt a beato Petro apostolo. Ratisbon: Typis et Sumptibus Georgii Josephi Manz. pp. 946–947. (Use with caution; obsolete)
- Gauchat, Patritius (Patrice) (1935). Hierarchia catholica IV (1592-1667). Münster: Libraria Regensbergiana. (in Latin)
- Ritzler, Remigius; Sefrin, Pirminus (1952). Hierarchia catholica medii et recentis aevi V (1667-1730). Patavii: Messagero di S. Antonio. (in Latin)
- Ritzler, Remigius; Sefrin, Pirminus (1958). Hierarchia catholica medii et recentis aevi VI (1730-1799). Patavii: Messagero di S. Antonio. (in Latin)
- Ritzler, Remigius; Sefrin, Pirminus (1968). Hierarchia Catholica medii et recentioris aevi sive summorum pontificum, S. R. E. cardinalium, ecclesiarum antistitum series... A pontificatu Pii PP. VII (1800) usque ad pontificatum Gregorii PP. XVI (1846) (in Latin). Vol. VII. Monasterii: Libr. Regensburgiana.
- Ritzler, Remigius; Pirminus Sefrin (1978). Hierarchia catholica Medii et recentioris aevi... A Pontificatu PII PP. IX (1846) usque ad Pontificatum Leonis PP. XIII (1903) (in Latin). Vol. VIII. Il Messaggero di S. Antonio.
- Pięta, Zenon (2002). Hierarchia catholica medii et recentioris aevi... A pontificatu Pii PP. X (1903) usque ad pontificatum Benedictii PP. XV (1922) (in Latin). Vol. IX. Padua: Messagero di San Antonio. ISBN 978-88-250-1000-8.

=== Studies ===
- Cappelletti, Giuseppe (1849). Storia della chiesa di Venezia dalla sua fondazione sino ai nostri giorni (in Italian). Vol. Tomo primo. Venice.
- Cappelletti, Giuseppe (1851). Storia della chiesa di Venezia dalla sua fondazione sino ai nostri giorni (in Italian). Vol. Tomo secondo. Venezia.
- Cappelletti, Giuseppe (1853). Storia della chiesa di Venezia dalla sua fondazione sino ai nostri giorni (in Italian). Vol. Terzo. Venezia.
- Cappelletti, Giuseppe (1850). Storia della chiesa di Venezia dalla sua fondazione sino ai nostri giorni (in Italian). Vol. Tomo sesto. Venice.
- Cappelletti, Giuseppe (1855). Le chiese d'Italia: dalla loro origine sino ai nostri giorni (in Italian). Vol. Tomo IX. Venice: G. Antonelli.
- Lentz, Harris M. III (2001). Popes and Cardinals of the 20th Century: A Biographical Dictionary. London: McFarland. ISBN 978-0-7864-4101-3.
- Orsoni, Alessandro (1833). Serie cronologica dei cardinali veneziani tratta dalle memorie inedite (in Italian). Venezia: Picotti.
- Piva, Vittorio (1938). Il Patriarcato di Venezia e le sue origini (in Italian). Venice: tip. San Marco.
- Piva, Vittorio (1960). Il Patriarcato di Venezia e le sue origini: libro 2 (in Italian). Vol. II. Venice: Tip S. Marco.
