= Archbishop =

Bishop of higher rank in many Christian denominations

In Latin Catholicism, metropolitan archbishops wear the pallium; a vestment that denotes his jurisdiction over his ecclesiastical province

In Christianity, an archbishop is a bishop of higher rank or office. In most cases, such as the Catholic Church, there are many archbishops who either have jurisdiction over an ecclesiastical province in addition to their own archdiocese, and some who hold non-metropolitan sees or are otherwise granted a titular archbishopric. In others, such as the Lutheran Church of Sweden, the title is borne by the leader of the denomination.

== Etymology ==
The word archbishop (/ˌɑːrtʃˈbɪʃəp/) comes via the Latin archiepiscopus. This in turn comes from the Greek αρχιεπίσκοπος, which has as components the etymons αρχι-, meaning 'chief', επί, 'over', and σκοπός, 'guardian, watcher'.

== Early history ==
The earliest appearance of neither the title nor the role can be traced. The title of "metropolitan" was apparently well known by the 4th century, when there are references in the canons of the First Council of Nicæa of 325 and Council of Antioch of 341, though the term seems to be used generally for all higher ranks of bishop, including patriarchs. The term "archbishop" does not appear in the modern sense until the 6th century, although the role, above ordinary bishops but below patriarchs, seems to be established for metropolitans by the 5th century.

== Western Christianity ==
Anselm of Canterbury, Archbishop of Canterbury (1093–1109)

=== Metropolitan archbishops ===
Episcopal sees are generally arranged in groups in which one see's bishop has certain powers and duties of oversight over the others. He is known as the metropolitan archbishop of that see. In the Catholic Church, canon 436 indicates what these powers and duties are for a Latin Church metropolitan archbishop, while those of the head of an autonomous (sui iuris) Eastern Catholic Churches are indicated in canon 157 of the Code of Canons of the Eastern Churches. All Catholic metropolitans are archbishops, but not all archbishops are metropolitans, though most are.

=== Non-metropolitan archiepiscopal sees ===
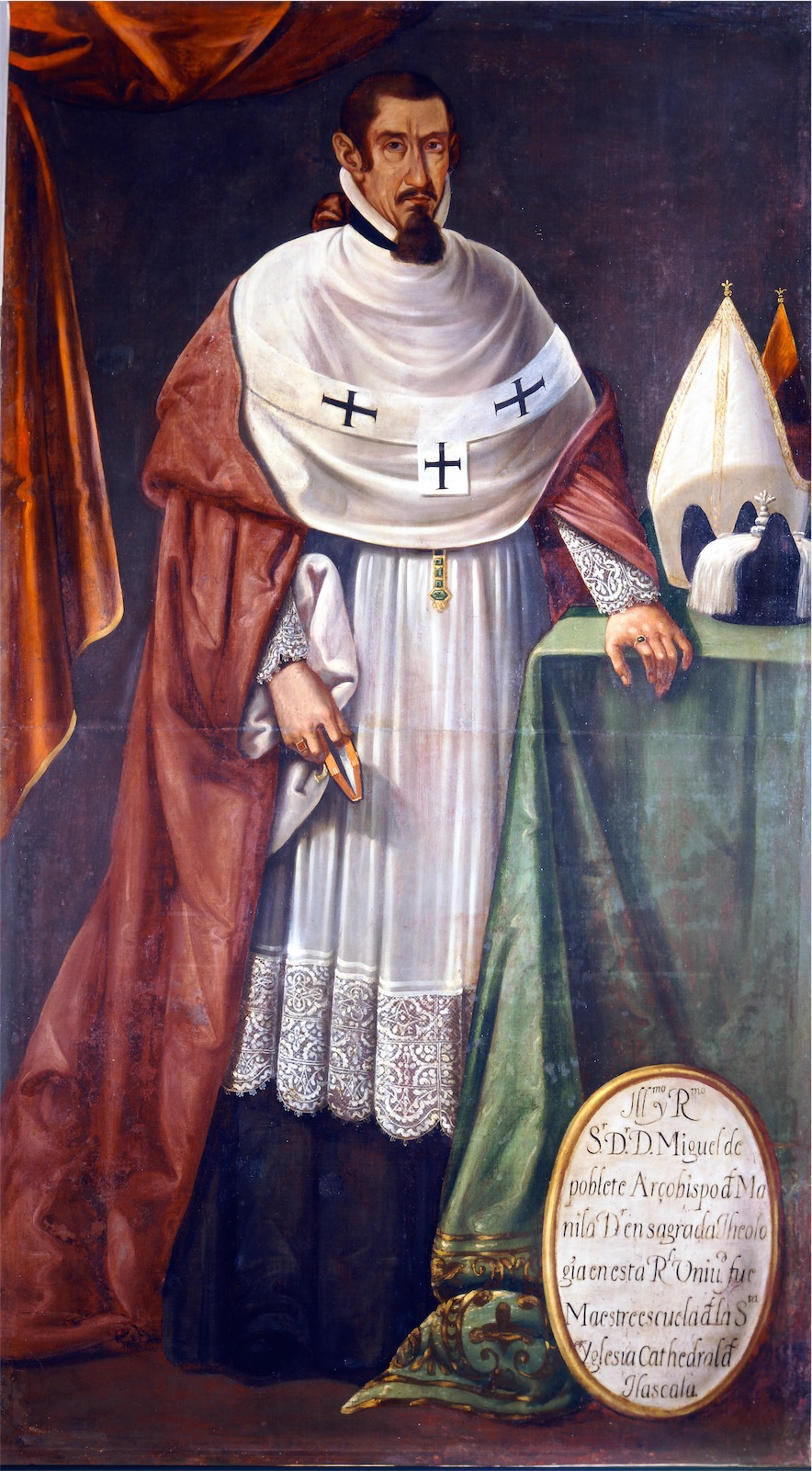
Miguel de Poblete Casasola, Archbishop of Manila (1649–1667)

As well as the much more numerous metropolitan sees, there are 77 Catholic sees that have archiepiscopal rank. In some cases, such a see is the only one in a country, such as Luxembourg or Monaco, too small to be divided into several dioceses so as to form an ecclesiastical province. In others, the title of archdiocese is for historical reasons attributed to a see that was once of greater importance.

Some of these archdioceses are suffragans of a metropolitan archdiocese; examples are the Archdiocese of Avignon, which is a suffragan of the Archdiocese of Marseille, and the Archdiocese of Trnava, Slovakia. Others are immediately subject to the Holy See and not to any metropolitan archdiocese. These are usually "aggregated" to an ecclesiastical province. An example is the Archdiocese of Hobart in Australia, associated with the Metropolitan ecclesiastical province of Melbourne, but not part of it. The ordinary of such an archdiocese is an archbishop.

In the Anglican Communion, non-metropolitan archiepiscopal sees are much less common. The Anglican Diocese of Jerusalem, established in 1841, was raised to the status of a non-metropolitan archiepiscopal see in 1957, but reduced to the status of an ordinary bishopric again in 1976. In 2014 it was again elevated to the status of non-metropolitan archbishopric, with its ordinary bearing the title "Archbishop in Jerusalem", despite having no ex officio right to be the metropolitan of the province.

=== Coadjutor archbishops ===
Until 1970, a coadjutor archbishop, one who has special faculties and the right to succeed to the leadership of a see on the death or resignation of the incumbent, was assigned also to a titular see, which he held until the moment of succession. Since then, the title of Coadjutor Archbishop of the see is considered sufficient and more appropriate.

=== Archbishops ad personam ===
The rank of archbishop is conferred on some bishops who are not ordinaries of an archdiocese. They hold the rank not because of the see that they head but because it has been granted to them personally (ad personam). Such a grant can be given when someone who already holds the rank of archbishop is transferred to a see that, though its present-day importance may be greater than the person's former see, is not archiepiscopal. The bishop transferred is then known as the archbishop-bishop of his new see. An example is Gianfranco Gardin, appointed Archbishop-Bishop of Treviso on 21 December 2009. The title borne by the successor of such an archbishop-bishop is merely that of Bishop of the see, unless he also is granted the personal title of Archbishop. Another example is Arthur Roche, who was Bishop of Leeds until his appointment as Secretary of the Congregation for Divine Worship and the Discipline of the Sacraments. Roche remained a bishop by virtue of his position as bishop emeritus of Leeds – rather than being transferred to a different titular archbishopric, he was appointed as an archbishop ad personam.

=== Titular archiepiscopal sees ===
The distinction between metropolitan sees and non-metropolitan archiepiscopal sees exists for titular sees as well as for residential ones. The Annuario Pontificio marks titular sees of the former class with the abbreviation Metr. and the others with Arciv.

Many of the titular sees to which nuncios and heads of departments of the Roman Curia who are not cardinals are assigned are not of archiepiscopal rank. In that case the person who is appointed to such a position is given the personal title of archbishop (ad personam). They are usually referred to as archbishop of the see, not as its archbishop-bishop.

=== Archbishops emeriti ===
If an archbishop resigns his see without being transferred to another, as in the case of retirement or assignment to head a department of the Roman Curia, the word emeritus is added to his former title, and he is called archbishop emeritus of his former see. Until 1970, such archbishops were transferred to a titular see.

There can be several archbishops emeriti of the same see: the 2008 Annuario Pontificio listed three living archbishops emeriti of Taipei.

There is no archbishop emeritus of a titular see; an archbishop who holds a titular see keeps it until death or until transferred to another see.

In the Anglican Communion, retired archbishops formally revert to being addressed as "bishop" and styled "The Right Reverend", although they may be appointed "archbishop emeritus" by their province on retirement, in which case they retain the title "archbishop" and the style "The Most Reverend", as a right. Archbishop Desmond Tutu was a prominent example, as archbishop emeritus of Cape Town. Former archbishops who have not received the status of archbishop emeritus may still be informally addressed as "archbishop" as a courtesy, unless they are subsequently appointed to a bishopric (not an archbishopric), in which case the courtesy ceases.

=== Privileges of archbishops ===
Catholic archbishop's coat of arms (non-metropolitan)

Catholic archbishop's coat of arms (version with pallium as for metropolitan archbishops)

While there is no difference between the official dress of archbishops, as such, and that of other bishops, Catholic metropolitan archbishops are distinguished by the use in liturgical ceremonies of the pallium, but only within the province over which they have oversight.

Catholic bishops and archbishops are styled "The Most Reverend" and addressed as "Your Excellency" in most cases. In English-speaking countries, a Catholic archbishop is addressed as "Your Grace", while a Catholic bishop is addressed as "Your Lordship". Before December 12, 1930, the title "Most Reverend" was only for archbishops, while bishops were styled as "Right Reverend". This practice is still followed by Catholic bishops in the United Kingdom to mirror that of the Church of England.

In Catholic heraldry, an archbishop has an ecclesiastical hat called a galero with ten tassels on each side of his coat of arms, while a bishop has only six. The archiepiscopal cross behind the shield has two bars instead of one. Such a cross may be borne before him in liturgical processions.

In processions and other occasions where strict protocol is observed, archbishops are ranked higher than diocesan bishops in the order of precedence.

In the Anglican Communion, archbishops are styled "The Most Reverend" and addressed as "Your Grace", while bishops are styled "The Right Reverend" and addressed as "My Lord" or "Your Lordship". In some countries, this usage is followed also by the Catholic Church, but in others no distinction is made and "The Most Reverend" and "Your Excellency" are used for archbishops and bishops alike. Anglican archbishops are entitled to be preceded by a server carrying an archiepiscopal processional cross (with two bars instead of one) in liturgical processions. The archbishop of Canterbury's metropolitical processional cross is always carried before him by a priest-chaplain, and (like other archbishops) is a two-barred processional cross. However, the archbishop of Canterbury is also entitled to be preceded by the ancient primatial cross of Canterbury (still in ceremonial use) which is of an ornate historical design, made of precious metal, and with precious stones inserted, but unlike his metropolitical cross (or those of other archbishops) it is not double-barred.

== Eastern Christianity ==
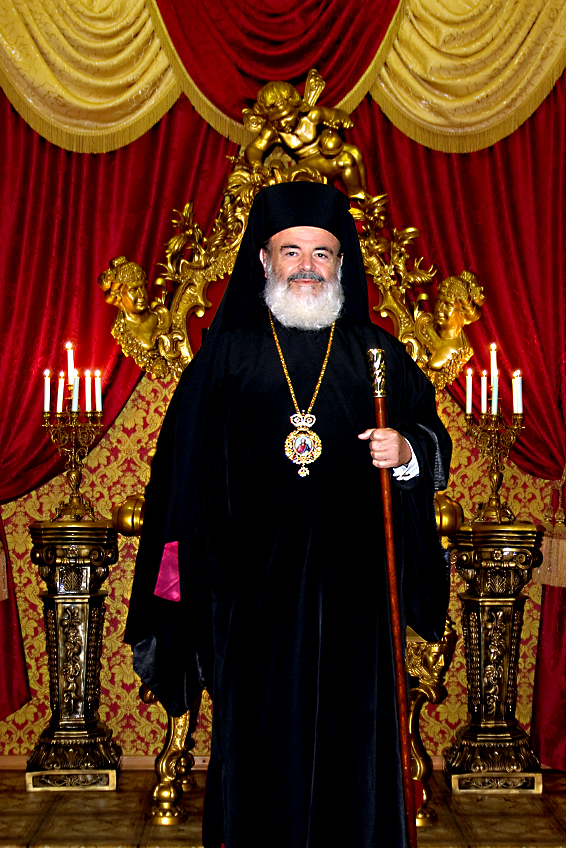
Archbishop Christodoulos of Athens and All Greece (1998–2008)

Archbishops exist in all traditional denominations of Eastern Christianity, including the Eastern Orthodox Church, the Oriental Orthodox Churches, Church of the East and the Eastern Catholic Churches.

=== Eastern Orthodox Church ===
In the Eastern Orthodox churches, the office and title of archbishop can be traced from the 4th and 5th century. Historically, the title was used variously, in terms of rank and jurisdiction.

In some Eastern Orthodox churches, archbishops are ranked above metropolitans in precedence, while in others that order is reversed. Primates of autocephalous Eastern Orthodox churches below patriarchal rank are generally designated as archbishops. In the Greek Orthodox Church, archbishops are ranked above metropolitans in precedence. The reverse is true for some Slavic Orthodox churches (Russian Orthodox, Bulgarian Orthodox) and also for Romanian Orthodox Church, where metropolitans rank above archbishops.

In terms of jurisdiction, there are two basic types of archbishops in the Eastern Orthodox Church: real archbishops and honorary archbishops. Real archbishops are primates of autocephalous or autonomous (regional) churches, and they have actual jurisdiction over other bishops, while honorary archbishops are in fact just diocesan bishops with honorary titles of archbishops and no jurisdiction outside their own diocese. The honorary title is usually conferred to bishops of historically important sees. For example, in the Serbian Orthodox Church, both types were represented: the head of the autonomous Orthodox Ohrid Archbishopric is styled Archbishop of Ohrid and invested with regional jurisdiction over all diocesan bishops in North Macedonia, while former diocesan bishop (late Amfilohije Radović) of the Eparchy of Montenegro and the Littoral, with seat in Cetinje, was personally given only the honorary title Archbishop of Cetinje, but without any jurisdiction over other diocesan bishops in Montenegro.

Historically, within the Patriarchate of Constantinople, honorary archiepiscopal titles were also granted to those diocesan bishops who were exempt from jurisdictions of local metropolitans, and transferred to the direct jurisdiction of the patriarchal throne. Such titular hierarchs were contentiously styled as "autocephalous archbishops" (self-headed, just in terms of not having a metropolitan, but without connotations to real autocephaly). For example, until the end of the 8th century, bishop of Amorium was under the jurisdiction of metropolitan of Pessinus, but he was later exempt and placed under direct patriarchal jurisdiction. On that occasion, he was given an honorary title of an autocephalous archbishop, but with no jurisdiction over other bishops. Sometime later (c. 814), metropolitan province of Amorium was created, and local archbishop finally gained regional jurisdiction as a metropolitan.

=== Oriental Orthodox Churches ===
The Oriental Orthodox custom generally agrees with the Slavic rather than the Greek with respect to the archbishop/metropolitan distinction.

=== Eastern Catholic Churches ===
Instead of the term archbishop, Eastern Catholic Churches sometimes use the word archeparch by analogy with eparch, the term used for a diocesan (or eparchial) bishop. However, the word archeparch is not found in the Code of Canons of the Eastern Churches.

== See also ==
- Apostolic succession
- Lists of patriarchs, archbishops, and bishops

== Sources ==
- Chrysos, Evangelos K. (1969). "Zur Entstehung der Institution der autokephalen Erzbistümer". Byzantinische Zeitschrift. 62 (2): 263–286. doi:10.1515/bz-1969-0204. S2CID 194081942.
- Komatina, Predrag (2013). "Date of the Composition of the Notitiae Episcopatuum Ecclesiae Constantinopolitanae nos. 4, 5 and 6" (PDF). Зборник радова Византолошког института. 50 (1): 195–214. Archived (PDF) from the original on 2016-12-27.
- Meyendorff, John (1989). Imperial unity and Christian divisions: The Church 450-680 A.D. The Church in history. Vol. 2. Crestwood, NY: St. Vladimir's Seminary Press. ISBN 9780881410563.
- Phillips, Walter Alison (1911). "Archbishop" . Encyclopædia Britannica. Vol. 2 (11th ed.). pp. 356–358.
