= Francesco Cornaro (1547–1598) =

Roman Catholic cardinal

Francesco Cornaro, iuniore (1547–1598) was a Roman Catholic cardinal who served as Bishop of Treviso (1577–1595).

== Episcopal succession ==
While bishop, he was the principal consecrator of:

- Alvise Cornaro (bishop), Titular Bishop of Paphus and Coadjutor Bishop of Padua (1589);

and the principal co-consecrator of:

- Gianfrancesco Morosini, Bishop of Brescia (1585);
- Antonio Grimani, Bishop of Torcello (1587);
- Alessandro Centurione, Archbishop of Genoa (1591)
- Marco Cornaro (bishop), Bishop of Padua (1594); and
- Camillo Borghese, Bishop of Jesi (1597).

Catholic Church titles
Preceded by Giorgio Cornaro (bishop of Treviso)	Bishop of Treviso; 1577–1595	Succeeded by Alvise Molino
Preceded by William Allen (cardinal)	Cardinal-Priest of Santi Silvestro e Martino ai Monti; 1596–1598	Succeeded by Fernando Niño de Guevara
