= 2010–11 Serie A =

109th season of top-tier Italian football

Serie A
- Season: 2010–11
- Dates: 28 August 2010 – 22 May 2011
- Champions: Milan; 18th Italian title
- Relegated: Sampdoria; Brescia; Bari
- Champions League: Milan; Internazionale; Napoli; Udinese
- Europa League: Lazio; Roma; Palermo
- Matches: 380
- Goals: 955 (2.51 per match)
- Top goalscorer: Antonio Di Natale (28 goals)
- Biggest home win: 4 goals (8 matches): Milan 4–0 Lecce (29 August 2010); Cagliari 5–1 Roma (11 September 2010); Inter 4–0 Bari (22 September 2010); Juventus 4–0 Lecce (17 October 2010); Udinese 4–0 Lecce (14 November 2010); Napoli 4–0 Sampdoria (30 January 2011); Milan 4–0 Parma (12 February 2011); Catania 4–0 Palermo (3 April 2011)
- Biggest away win: Palermo 0–7 Udinese (27 February 2011)
- Highest scoring: AC Milan 4–4 Udinese (9 January 2011); Internazionale 5–3 Roma (6 February 2011)

The 2010–11 Serie A (known as the Serie A TIM for sponsorship reasons) was the 109th season of top-tier Italian football, the 79th in a round-robin tournament, and the 1st since its organization under a league committee separate from Serie B. It began on 28 August 2010 and ended on 22 May 2011. Internazionale were the defending champions.

AC Milan won the 2010–11 Serie A and their 18th league title overall with a scoreless draw away to Roma on 7 May 2011. This result ensured that with two rounds remaining AC Milan's nearest rival Internazionale could only draw level on points, and AC Milan holds the tiebreaker based on their better head-to-head record. The result prompted celebrations at AC Milan's Piazza del Duomo. The trophy was presented at AC Milan's next home game on 14 May.

It was AC Milan's first Scudetto since 2004 and it ended a run of five successive Serie A titles by their rival Internazionale. It was the first league title for manager Massimiliano Allegri, winning in his first year with AC Milan and who was for many a surprise choice as manager. AC Milan led the table for most of the season and secured the title with two games remaining. Notably, they defeated defending champions Internazionale twice during the season and also did the same to third place challenger Napoli. AC Milan were credited for strengthening their squad with Zlatan Ibrahimović and Robinho in the summer as well as picking up Antonio Cassano and Mark van Bommel in January.

This would be the last Scudetto not won by Juventus until the 2020–21 Serie A.

== Rule changes ==
The rules for the registration of non-EU (or non-EFTA or Swiss) nationals transferred from abroad were revised in the summer of 2010 and announced on 2 July 2010. Clubs could only sign one (rather than two previously) non-EU player and that player could only be signed if a current member of the squad who was not an EU national had been sold or sold abroad. The late announcement of this rule change meant that some clubs had to cancel incoming transfers. Parma, for example, were to sign both Colombian Pablo Armero from Brazilian side Palmeiras, who subsequently signed for Udinese instead, and Brazilian agency player Zé Eduardo, but had to choose between them and eventually transferred the latter. Their outgoing transfer was Julio César de León, who moved to Chinese team Shandong Luneng Taishan.

== Teams ==
The league featured 17 teams returning from the 2009–10 Serie A, plus three teams promoted from 2009–10 Serie B (two as direct promotions, one as playoff winners). On 30 May 2010, Lecce and Cesena won direct promotion to the Serie A by finishing first and second, respectively. Brescia became the third Serie B team promoted on 13 June 2010 by winning the promotion playoff final 2–1 on aggregate over Torino. It was a quick turn-around for Lecce, which spent only one year in Serie B after being relegated from the 2008–09 Serie A. Cesena last played in Serie A in 1990–91, while Brescia played five seasons in Serie B after being relegated from A in 2004–05.

Locations of the 2010–11 Serie A teams

=== Stadia and locations ===
Club	City	Stadium	Capacity	2009–10 season
Bari	Bari	San Nicola	58,270	10th in Serie A
Bologna	Bologna	Renato Dall'Ara	39,444	17th in Serie A
Brescia	Brescia	Mario Rigamonti	16,308	Serie B Playoff Winners
Cagliari	Cagliari	Sant'Elia	23,486	16th in Serie A
Catania	Catania	Angelo Massimino	23,420	13th in Serie A
Cesena	Cesena	Dino Manuzzi	23,860	Serie B Runners-up
ChievoVerona	Verona	Marc'Antonio Bentegodi	39,211	14th in Serie A
Fiorentina	Florence	Artemio Franchi	47,282	11th in Serie A
Genoa	Genoa	Luigi Ferraris	36,685	9th in Serie A
Internazionale	Milan	San Siro	80,074	Serie A Champions
Juventus	Turin	Olimpico di Torino	27,994	7th in Serie A
Lazio	Rome	Olimpico	72,698	12th in Serie A
Lecce	Lecce	Via del Mare	33,876	Serie B Champions
Milan	Milan	San Siro	80,074	3rd in Serie A
Napoli	Naples	San Paolo	60,240	6th in Serie A
Palermo	Palermo	Renzo Barbera	37,242	5th in Serie A
Parma	Parma	Ennio Tardini	27,906	8th in Serie A
Roma	Rome	Olimpico	72,698	2nd in Serie A
Sampdoria	Genoa	Luigi Ferraris	36,685	4th in Serie A
Udinese	Udine	Friuli	41,652	15th in Serie A

=== Personnel and sponsorship ===
Team	Head coach	Captain	Kit manufacturer	Shirt sponsor
Bari	(Italy) Bortolo Mutti	(Belgium) Jean François Gillet	Erreà	Banca Popolare di Bari, Radionorba
Bologna	(Italy) Alberto Malesani	(Italy) Marco Di Vaio	Macron	Ceramica Serenissima (Home)/Cerasarda (Away), Manila Grace
Brescia	(Italy) Giuseppe Iachini	(Italy) Davide Possanzini	Mass	UBI Banco di Brescia, T-Logic/Tescoma
Cagliari	(Italy) Roberto Donadoni	(Italy) Daniele Conti	Macron	Dahlia TV, Sardegna
Catania	(Argentina) Diego Simeone	(Argentina) Matías Silvestre	Legea	SP Energia Siciliana
Cesena	(Italy) Massimo Ficcadenti	(Italy) Giuseppe Colucci	Adidas	Technogym
ChievoVerona	(Italy) Stefano Pioli	(Italy) Sergio Pellissier	Givova	Banca Popolare di Verona/Merkur-Win, Midac Batteries
Fiorentina	(Serbia) Siniša Mihajlović	(Italy) Riccardo Montolivo	Lotto	Save The Children/Mazda
Genoa	(Italy) Davide Ballardini	(Italy) Marco Rossi	Asics	iZiPlay
Internazionale	(Brazil) Leonardo	(Argentina) Javier Zanetti	Nike	Pirelli
Juventus	(Italy) Luigi Delneri	(Italy) Alessandro Del Piero	Nike	Betclic (Home)/Balocco (Away)
Lazio	(Italy) Edoardo Reja	(Italy) Tommaso Rocchi	Puma	Clinica Paideia
Lecce	(Italy) Luigi De Canio	(Uruguay) Guillermo Giacomazzi	Asics	BancaApulia/Veneto Banca, BetItaly
Milan	(Italy) Massimiliano Allegri	(Italy) Massimo Ambrosini	Adidas	Fly Emirates
Napoli	(Italy) Walter Mazzarri	(Italy) Paolo Cannavaro	Macron	Lete
Palermo	(Italy) Delio Rossi	(Italy) Fabrizio Miccoli	Lotto	Eurobet, Banca Nuova
Parma	(Italy) Franco Colomba	(Italy) Stefano Morrone	Erreà	Navigare, Banca Monte Parma
Roma	(Italy) Vincenzo Montella	(Italy) Francesco Totti	Kappa	Wind/Infostrada (in cup matches)
Sampdoria	(Italy) Alberto Cavasin	(Italy) Angelo Palombo	Kappa	Erg Mobile
Udinese	(Italy) Francesco Guidolin	(Italy) Antonio Di Natale	Lotto	Automobile Dacia, Tipicamente Friulano/Lumberjack

=== Managerial changes ===
Team	Outgoing head coach	Manner of departure	Date of vacancy	Incoming head coach	Date of appointment	Table
Milan	(Brazil) Leonardo	Mutual consent	16 May 2010	(Italy) Massimiliano Allegri	25 June 2010	Pre-season
Juventus	(Italy) Alberto Zaccheroni	End of contract	16 May 2010	(Italy) Luigi Delneri	19 May 2010	Pre-season
Udinese	(Italy) Pasquale Marino	Mutual consent	16 May 2010	(Italy) Francesco Guidolin	24 May 2010	Pre-season
Parma	(Italy) Francesco Guidolin	Resigned	16 May 2010	(Italy) Pasquale Marino	2 June 2010	Pre-season
Cagliari	(Italy) Giorgio Melis	End of caretaker spell	16 May 2010	(Italy) Pierpaolo Bisoli	23 June 2010	Pre-season
Sampdoria	(Italy) Luigi Delneri	End of contract	17 May 2010	(Italy) Domenico Di Carlo	26 May 2010	Pre-season
Catania	(Serbia) Siniša Mihajlović	Resigned	24 May 2010	(Italy) Marco Giampaolo	30 May 2010	Pre-season
ChievoVerona	(Italy) Domenico Di Carlo	Resigned	26 May 2010	(Italy) Stefano Pioli	10 June 2010	Pre-season
Internazionale	(Portugal) José Mourinho	Signed by Real Madrid	28 May 2010	(Spain) Rafael Benítez	10 June 2010	Pre-season
Fiorentina	(Italy) Cesare Prandelli	Signed by Italy	30 May 2010	(Serbia) Siniša Mihajlović	3 June 2010	Pre-season
Cesena	(Italy) Pierpaolo Bisoli	End of contract	30 May 2010	(Italy) Massimo Ficcadenti	12 June 2010	Pre-season
Bologna	(Italy) Franco Colomba	Sacked	29 August 2010	(Italy) Paolo Magnani (caretaker)	29 August 2010	Pre-season
Bologna	(Italy) Paolo Magnani	End of caretaker spell	29 August 2010	(Italy) Alberto Malesani	1 September 2010	9th
Genoa	(Italy) Gian Piero Gasperini	Sacked	8 November 2010	(Italy) Davide Ballardini	8 November 2010	14th
Cagliari	(Italy) Pierpaolo Bisoli	Sacked	15 November 2010	(Italy) Roberto Donadoni	16 November 2010	19th
Brescia	(Italy) Giuseppe Iachini	Sacked	6 December 2010	(Italy) Mario Beretta	6 December 2010	17th
Internazionale	(Spain) Rafael Benítez	Sacked	23 December 2010	(Brazil) Leonardo	24 December 2010	7th
Catania	(Italy) Marco Giampaolo	Mutual consent	18 January 2011	(Argentina) Diego Simeone	19 January 2011	15th
Brescia	(Italy) Mario Beretta	Sacked	30 January 2011	(Italy) Giuseppe Iachini	30 January 2011	19th
Bari	(Italy) Giampiero Ventura	Mutual consent	10 February 2011	(Italy) Bortolo Mutti	10 February 2011	20th
Roma	(Italy) Claudio Ranieri	Resigned	20 February 2011	(Italy) Vincenzo Montella (caretaker)	21 February 2011	8th
Palermo	(Italy) Delio Rossi	Sacked	28 February 2011	(Italy) Serse Cosmi	28 February 2011	8th
Sampdoria	(Italy) Domenico Di Carlo	Sacked	7 March 2011	(Italy) Alberto Cavasin	7 March 2011	14th
Parma	(Italy) Pasquale Marino	Sacked	3 April 2011	(Italy) Franco Colomba	5 April 2011	16th
Palermo	(Italy) Serse Cosmi	Sacked	3 April 2011	(Italy) Delio Rossi	3 April 2011	8th

== League table ==
Pos	Team	Pld	W	D	L	GF	GA	GD	Pts	Qualification or relegation
1	Milan (C)	38	24	10	4	65	24	+41	82	Qualification to Champions League group stage
2	Internazionale	38	23	7	8	69	42	+27	76	Qualification to Champions League group stage
3	Napoli	38	21	7	10	59	39	+20	70	Qualification to Champions League group stage
4	Udinese	38	20	6	12	65	43	+22	66 (Note: Udinese finished ahead of Lazio on head-to-head away goals scored: Udinese 2–1 Lazio, Lazio 3–2 Udinese.)	Qualification to Champions League play-off round
5	Lazio	38	20	6	12	55	39	+16	66	Qualification to Europa League play-off round (Note: As Internazionale won the 2010–11 Coppa Italia and already qualified for the Champions League, Palermo entered the 2011–12 UEFA Europa League third qualification round as the cup runners-up.)
6	Roma	38	18	9	11	59	52	+7	63	Qualification to Europa League play-off round
7	Juventus	38	15	13	10	57	47	+10	58	
8	Palermo	38	17	5	16	58	63	−5	56	Qualification to Europa League third qualifying round
9	Fiorentina	38	12	15	11	49	44	+5	51 (Note: Fiorentina finished ahead of Genoa on head-to-head points: Fiorentina 1–0 Genoa, Genoa 1–1 Fiorentina.)	
10	Genoa	38	14	9	15	45	47	−2	51	
11	ChievoVerona	38	11	13	14	38	40	−2	46 (Note: Chievo finished ahead of Parma and Catania on head-to-head points: Chievo: 6 pts, Parma: 5 pts, Catania: 4 pts.)	
12	Parma	38	11	13	14	39	47	−8	46	
13	Catania	38	12	10	16	40	52	−12	46	
14	Cagliari	38	12	9	17	44	51	−7	45	
15	Cesena	38	11	10	17	38	50	−12	43	
16	Bologna	38	11	12	15	35	52	−17	42 (Note: Bologna were deducted a total 3 points: 1 point because of unpaid taxes, plus 2 points because of unpaid wages.)	
17	Lecce	38	11	8	19	46	66	−20	41	
18	Sampdoria (R)	38	8	12	18	33	49	−16	36	Relegation to Serie B
19	Brescia (R)	38	7	11	20	34	52	−18	32	Relegation to Serie B
20	Bari (R)	38	5	9	24	27	56	−29	24	Relegation to Serie B

Source: Lega Serie A
Rules for classification: 1) points; 2) head-to-head points; 3) head-to-head goal difference; 4) head-to-head goals scored; 5) goal difference; 6) number of goals scored.
(C) Champions; (R) Relegated

== Results ==
Home \ Away	BAR	BOL	BRE	CAG	CTN	CES	CHV	FIO	GEN	INT	JUV	LAZ	LCE	MIL	NAP	PAL	PAR	ROM	SAM	UDI
Bari		0–2	2–1	0–0	1–1	1–1	1–2	1–1	0–0	0–3	1–0	0–2	0–2	2–3	0–2	1–1	0–1	2–3	0–1	0–2
Bologna	0–4		1–0	2–2	1–0	0–2	2–1	1–1	1–1	0–0	0–0	3–1	2–0	0–3	0–2	1–0	0–0	0–1	1–1	2–1
Brescia	2–0	3–1		1–2	1–2	1–2	0–3	2–2	0–0	1–1	1–1	0–2	2–2	0–1	0–1	3–2	2–0	2–1	1–0	0–1
Cagliari	2–1	2–0	1–1		3–0	0–2	4–1	1–2	0–1	0–1	1–3	1–0	3–2	0–1	0–1	3–1	1–1	5–1	0–0	0–4
Catania	1–0	1–1	1–0	2–0		2–0	1–1	0–0	2–1	1–2	1–3	1–4	3–2	0–2	1–1	4–0	2–1	2–1	1–0	1–0
Cesena	1–0	0–2	1–0	1–0	1–1		1–0	2–2	0–0	1–2	2–2	1–0	1–0	2–0	1–4	1–2	1–1	0–1	0–1	0–3
ChievoVerona	0–0	2–0	0–1	0–0	2–1	2–1		0–1	0–0	2–1	1–1	0–1	1–0	1–2	2–0	0–0	0–0	2–2	0–0	0–2
Fiorentina	2–1	1–1	3–2	1–0	3–0	1–0	1–0		1–0	1–2	0–0	1–2	1–1	1–2	1–1	1–2	2–0	2–2	0–0	5–2
Genoa	2–1	1–0	3–0	0–1	1–0	3–2	1–3	1–1		0–1	0–2	0–0	4–2	1–1	0–1	1–0	3–1	4–3	2–1	2–4
Internazionale	4–0	4–1	1–1	1–0	3–1	3–2	2–0	3–1	5–2		0–0	2–1	1–0	0–1	3–1	3–2	5–2	5–3	1–1	2–1
Juventus	2–1	0–2	2–1	4–2	2–2	3–1	2–2	1–1	3–2	1–0		2–1	4–0	0–1	2–2	1–3	1–4	1–1	3–3	1–2
Lazio	1–0	3–1	1–0	2–1	1–1	1–0	1–1	2–0	4–2	3–1	0–1		1–2	1–1	2–0	2–0	2–0	0–2	1–0	3–2
Lecce	0–1	0–1	2–1	3–3	1–0	1–1	3–2	1–0	1–3	1–1	2–0	2–4		1–1	2–1	2–4	1–1	1–2	2–3	2–0
Milan	1–1	1–0	3–0	4–1	1–1	2–0	3–1	1–0	1–0	3–0	1–2	0–0	4–0		3–0	3–1	4–0	0–1	3–0	4–4
Napoli	2–2	4–1	0–0	2–1	1–0	2–0	1–3	0–0	1–0	1–1	3–0	4–3	1–0	1–2		1–0	2–0	2–0	4–0	1–2
Palermo	2–1	4–1	1–0	0–0	3–1	2–2	1–3	2–4	1–0	1–2	2–1	0–1	2–2	1–0	2–1		3–1	3–1	3–0	0–7
Parma	1–2	0–0	2–0	1–2	2–0	2–2	0–0	1–1	1–1	2–0	1–0	1–1	0–1	0–1	1–3	3–1		0–0	1–0	2–1
Roma	1–0	2–2	1–1	3–0	4–2	0–0	1–0	3–2	2–1	1–0	0–2	2–0	2–0	0–0	0–2	2–3	2–2		3–1	2–0
Sampdoria	3–0	3–1	3–3	0–1	0–0	2–3	0–0	2–1	0–1	0–2	0–0	2–0	1–2	1–1	1–2	1–2	0–1	2–1		0–0
Udinese	1–0	1–1	0–0	1–1	2–0	1–0	2–0	2–1	0–1	3–1	0–4	2–1	4–0	0–0	3–1	2–1	0–2	1–2	2–0	

Source: Lega Serie A
Legend: Blue = home team win; Yellow = draw; Red = away team win.

== Top goalscorers ==
Rank	Player	Club	Goals
1	(Italy) Antonio Di Natale	Udinese	28
2	(Uruguay) Edinson Cavani	Napoli	26
3	(Cameroon) Samuel Eto'o	Internazionale	21
4	(Italy) Alessandro Matri	Cagliari/Juventus	20
5	(Italy) Marco Di Vaio	Bologna	19
6	(Italy) Giampaolo Pazzini	Sampdoria/Internazionale	17
7	(Italy) Francesco Totti	Roma	15
8	(Sweden) Zlatan Ibrahimović	Milan	14
8	(Brazil) Alexandre Pato	Milan	14
8	(Brazil) Robinho	Milan	14

=== Hat-tricks ===
Player	Club	Against	Result	Date
(Serbia) Miloš Krasić	Juventus	Cagliari	3–3	26 September 2010
(Argentina) Javier Pastore	Palermo	Catania	3–1	14 November 2010
(Italy) Antonio Di Natale	Udinese	Lecce	4–0	14 November 2010
(Italy) Giampaolo Pazzini	Sampdoria	Lecce	3–2	21 November 2010
(Italy) Antonio Di Natale	Udinese	Napoli	3–1	28 November 2010
(Serbia) Dejan Stanković	Internazionale	Parma	5–2	28 November 2010
(Brazil) Nenê	Cagliari	Catania	3–0	12 December 2010
(Uruguay) Edinson Cavani	Napoli	Juventus	3–0	9 January 2011
(Uruguay) Edinson Cavani	Napoli	Sampdoria	4–0	30 January 2011
(Chile) Alexis Sánchez^{4}	Udinese	Palermo	7–0	27 February 2011
(Italy) Antonio Di Natale	Udinese	Palermo	7–0	27 February 2011
(Uruguay) Edinson Cavani	Napoli	Lazio	4–3	3 April 2011
(Italy) Francesco Grandolfo	Bari	Bologna	4–0	22 May 2011

^{4} Player scored four goals

== Awards ==
The Gran Galà del Calcio AIC 2011 was the first edition of the awards ceremony organized by the Italian Footballers' Association (AIC), recognizing the best performers of the 2010–11 Serie A season

Award	Winner	Club
Player of the Year	(Sweden) Zlatan Ibrahimović	Milan
Coach of the Year	(Italy) Massimiliano Allegri	Milan
Best Goalkeeper	(Slovenia) Samir Handanović	Udinese
Best Referee	(Italy) Nicola Rizzoli	
Best Club	Udinese	Udinese
Capocannoniere	(Italy) Antonio Di Natale	Udinese

Serie A Team of the Year
Goalkeeper	(Slovenia) Samir Handanović (Udinese)			
Defence	(Italy) Christian Maggio (Napoli)	(Brazil) Thiago Silva (Milan)	(Italy) Alessandro Nesta / Andrea Ranocchia (Milan / Internazionale)	(Colombia) Pablo Armero (Udinese)
Midfield	(Slovakia) Marek Hamšík (Napoli)		(Ghana) Kevin-Prince Boateng (Milan)	(Italy) Claudio Marchisio / Thiago Motta (Juventus / Internazionale)
Attack	(Italy) Antonio Di Natale (Udinese)		(Uruguay) Edinson Cavani (Napoli)	(Sweden) Zlatan Ibrahimović (Milan)

== Attendances ==
#	Club	Avg. attendance	Highest
1	Internazionale	59,697	80,018
2	AC Milan	53,916	80,018
3	SSC Napoli	45,608	58,666
4	AS Roma	33,952	58,083
5	SS Lazio	29,122	52,121
6	US Città di Palermo	24,812	29,597
7	ACF Fiorentina	23,608	34,483
8	Genoa CFC	23,466	29,465
9	UC Sampdoria	23,330	31,500
10	Juventus FC	21,966	24,908
11	Bologna FC 1909	19,810	33,092
12	AS Bari	19,752	45,162
13	Udinese Calcio	17,554	29,644
14	AC Cesena	16,469	22,139
15	Parma FC	14,524	19,615
16	Calcio Catania	13,731	19,136
17	Cagliari Calcio	13,000	23,000
18	ChievoVerona	12,676	29,404
19	US Lecce	10,729	20,386
20	Brescia Calcio	8,403	22,123
