= Niccolò Franco =

Roman Catholic prelate

Most Reverend Niccolò Franco
- Bishop of Treviso
- Church: Catholic Church
- Diocese: Diocese of Poreč
- In office: 1485–1499
- Predecessor: Lorenzo Zanni
- Successor: Bernardo de' Rossi
- Previous post: Bishop of Poreč (1477–1485)

Personal details
- Died: 1499 Treviso, Italy

Niccolò Franco (died 1499) was a Roman Catholic prelate who served as Bishop of Treviso (1485–1499) and Bishop of Poreč (1477–1485).

== Biography ==
In 1477, Niccolò Franco was appointed during the papacy of Pope Sixtus IV as Bishop of Poreč. On 21 February 1485, he was appointed during the papacy of Pope Innocent VIII as Bishop of Treviso. He served as Bishop of Treviso until his death in 1499.

== External links and additional sources ==
- Cheney, David M. "Diocese of Treviso". Catholic-Hierarchy.org. (for Chronology of Bishops) ^{[self-published]}
- Chow, Gabriel. "Diocese of Treviso (Italy)". GCatholic.org. (for Chronology of Bishops) ^{[self-published]}
- Cheney, David M. "Diocese of Poreč i Pula (Parenzo)". Catholic-Hierarchy.org. (for Chronology of Bishops) ^{[self-published]}
- Chow, Gabriel. "Diocese of Poreč i Pula (Croatia)". GCatholic.org. (for Chronology of Bishops) ^{[self-published]}

Catholic Church titles
Preceded by Barthelemy Barbarigo	Bishop of Poreč; 1477–1485	Succeeded by Tommaso Catanei
Preceded by Giovanni Dacri	Bishop of Treviso; 1485–1499	Succeeded by Bernardo de' Rossi
