= Zaccaria della Vecchia =

Most Reverend Zaccaria della Vecchia
- Bishop of Torcello
- Church: Catholic Church
- Diocese: Diocese of Torcello
- In office: 1618–1625
- Predecessor: Antonio Grimani (patriarch)
- Successor: Marco Giustiniani

Orders
- Consecration: 20 May 1618 by Giovanni Garzia Mellini

Personal details
- Died: 1625 Torcello, Italy

Zaccaria della Vecchia (died 1625) was a Roman Catholic prelate who served as Bishop of Torcello (1618–1625).

== Biography ==
On 14 May 1618, Zaccaria della Vecchia was appointed during the papacy of Pope Paul V as Bishop of Torcello. On 20 May 1618, he was consecrated bishop by Giovanni Garzia Mellini, Cardinal-Priest of Santi Quattro Coronati, with Paolo De Curtis, Bishop Emeritus of Isernia, and Giovanni Battista Lancellotti, Bishop of Nola. serving as co-consecrators. He served as Bishop of Torcello until his death in 1625.

== External links and additional sources ==
- Cheney, David M. "Diocese of Torcello (Turris)". Catholic-Hierarchy.org. (for Chronology of Bishops) ^{[self-published]}
- Chow, Gabriel. "Titular Episcopal See of Torcello (Italy)". GCatholic.org. (for Chronology of Bishops) ^{[self-published]}

Catholic Church titles
| Preceded by Antonio Grimani | Bishop of Torcello; 1618–1625 | Succeeded by Marco Giustiniani |
