= Francesco Barozzi (bishop) =

Bishop of Treviso from 1466 to 1471

Most Reverend Francesco Barozzi
- Bishop of Treviso
- Church: Catholic Church
- Diocese: Diocese of Treviso
- In office: 1466–1471
- Predecessor: Teodoro de Lellis
- Successor: Pietro Riario
- Previous posts: Professor, University of Padua (1440-1466); Canon of Bergamo

Orders
- Consecration: 6 July 1466 by Gautier de Forcalquier

Personal details
- Died: 1471 Treviso, Italy

Francesco Barozzi (died 1471) was a professor and a Roman Catholic prelate who served as Bishop of Treviso (1466–1471).

== Biography ==
Francesco Barozzi was born in Italy. He taught law at the University of Padua from 1440 to 1466. He was also a Canon of Bergamo.

On 17 April 1466, he was appointed during the papacy of Pope Paul II as Bishop of Treviso. On 6 July 1466, he was consecrated bishop by Gautier de Forcalquier, Bishop of Gap, with Placido Pavanello, Bishop of Torcello, and Nicolas de Crucibus, Bishop of Hvar, serving as co-consecrators. He served as Bishop of Treviso until his death in 1471.

== External links and additional sources ==
- Cheney, David M. "Diocese of Treviso". Catholic-Hierarchy.org. (for Chronology of Bishops) ^{[self-published]}
- Chow, Gabriel. "Diocese of Treviso (Italy)". GCatholic.org. (for Chronology of Bishops) ^{[self-published]}
- Geiger, Roger (1990-01-01). History of Higher Education Annual: 1990. Transaction Publishers. ISBN 978-1-4128-2533-7.

Catholic Church titles
Preceded by Teodoro de Lellis	Bishop of Treviso; 1466–1471	Succeeded by Pietro Riario
