= Federico Maria Zinelli =

Italian Roman Catholic priest

Bishop Federico Maria Zinelli
- Bishop of Treviso
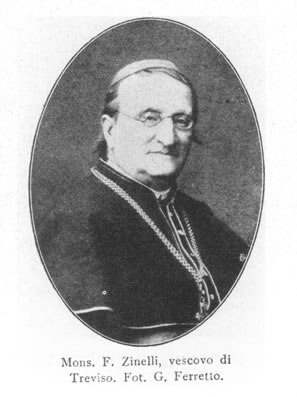
- Diocese: Treviso
- Appointed: 23 August 1861
- Term ended: 24 November 1879
- Predecessor: Giovanni Antonio Farina
- Successor: Giuseppe Callegari
- Previous post: Bishop of Treviso (1861–1879)

Orders
- Ordination: 26 December 1827
- Consecration: 9 February 1862 by Giuseppe Luigi Trevisanato
- Rank: Bishop

Personal details
- Born: 23 June 1805 Venice, Kingdom of Lombardy–Venetia
- Died: 24 November 1879 (aged 74) Treviso, Kingdom of Italy

Federico Maria Zinelli (23 June 1805 – 24 November 1879) was an Italian Roman Catholic priest, from 1861 until his death as bishop of Treviso.

A member of the De Fide Commission, Zinelli wrote the third chapter of Pastor aeternus, which defines the doctrine of papal infallibility.

== Life ==
Of noble birth in Venice, Zinelli was ordained a deacon on 22 September 1827 and a priest on 26 December 1827. He became known for his high culture and rigid theological positions.

In 1832, Zinelli published Dei due metodi analitico e sintetico ("Of the two methods analytical and synthetic"). He became director of the seminary of Venice, then canon theologian of St Mark's Basilica and vicar general of the Patriarchate of Venice. On 23 August 1861, the Habsburg government of the Kingdom of Lombardy–Venetia nominated him as bishop of Treviso, to succeed Giovanni Antonio Farina, and the appointment was confirmed by Pope Pius IX on 30 September.

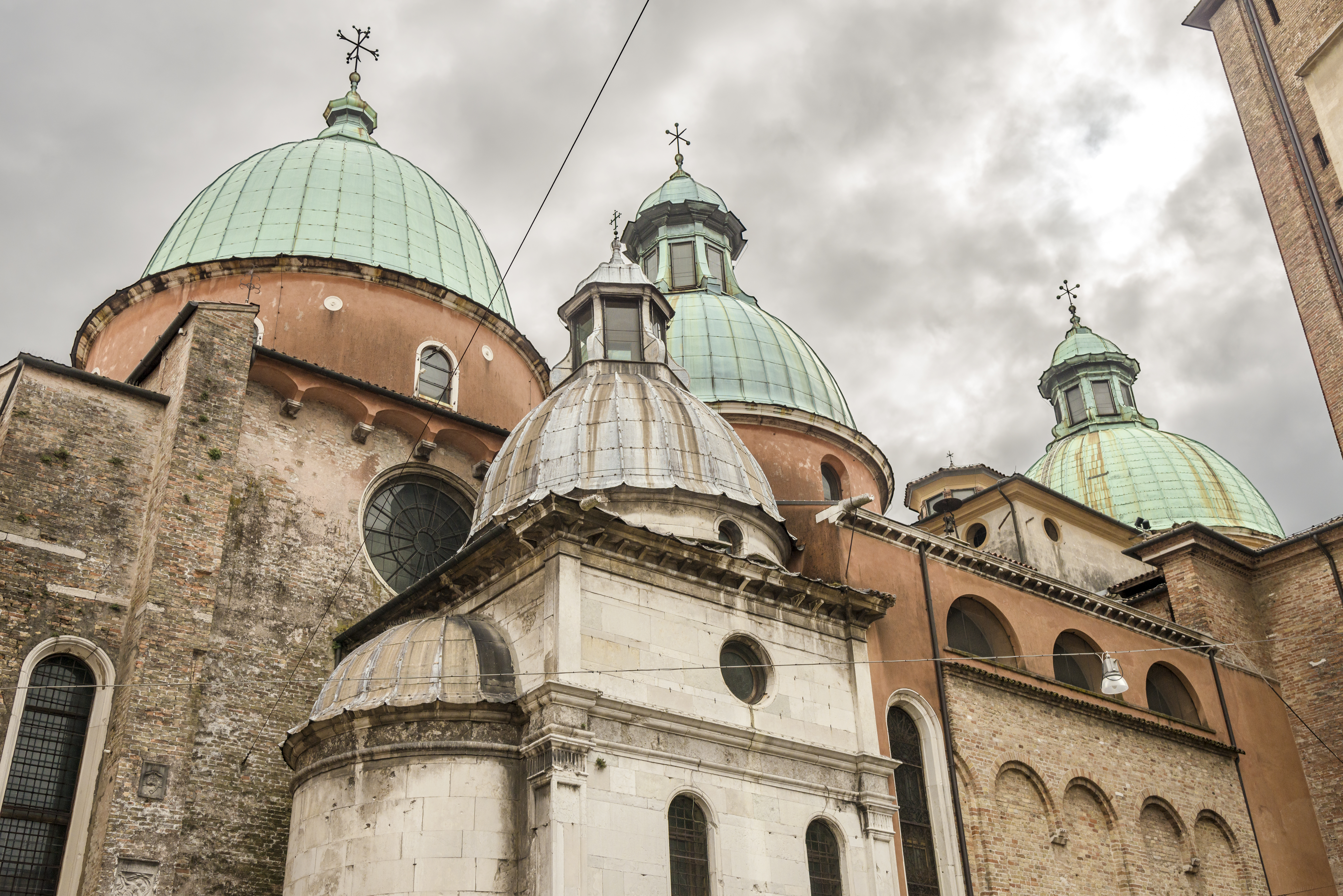
Treviso Cathedral

Zinelli took part in the First Vatican Council in Rome between 1869 and 1870, interrupted by the Capture of Rome by the forces of Raffaele Cadorna during the Risorgimento. He was appointed as a member of the De Fide Commission, chaired by Luigi Maria Cardinal Bilio, and was the author of the third chapter of Pastor aeternus, which defines the doctrine of papal infallibility.

In April 1875, Zinelli appointed Giuseppe Sarto (the future Pope Pius X) as chancellor of his diocese. In the summer of the same year he was struck down by apoplexy and was almost unable to continue as a bishop. However, he continued in office until his death in 1879, when Giuseppe Sarto issued the following statement:

"Today on 24 November of the year 1879 at 9:30 am, following a stroke, which he suffered on 20 November at about midday, equipped with the comforts of Religion, and especially blessed from the SP, his most Illustrious and Reverend Excellency Monsignor Federico Maria Zinelli, bishop of Treviso, passed to his eternal rest, having been born in Venice on 23 June 1805, appointed bishop on 21 August 1861, confirmed on the following 30 September, consecrated in Udine on 11 February 1862, and after having governed the diocese with singular prudence, with the courage of the apostle, and with the charity of our father. The city is desolate by the irreparable disaster by which it is struck and is preparing to show its gratitude to its venerable bishop in all possible ways. May the Lord welcome him into his bosom, and may the soul of that blessed one soon implore us another bishop, to whom we can exhibit the same servitude, the same obedience, the same unlimited obedience, which we have exhibited to him for so many years, the only comfort that remains for us in so much bitterness. C. Gius. Sarto, Bishop’s Chancellor."

The body of Zinelli was buried first in a tomb within the new church of Santa Bona di Treviso, which he had had built. In 1931, his remains were moved to the chapel of Our Lady in Treviso Cathedral and are now with those of other bishops of Treviso in the crypt.
