= Carlo Pisani =

Most Reverend Carlo Pisani
- Bishop of Torcello
- Church: Catholic Church
- Diocese: Diocese of Torcello
- In office: 1579–1587
- Predecessor: Giovanni Delfino
- Successor: Antonio Grimani (patriarch)

Personal details
- Died: 1587 Torcello, Italy

Carlo Pisani (died 1587) was a Roman Catholic prelate who served as Bishop of Torcello (1579–1587).

== Biography ==
On 26 August 1579, Carlo Pisani was appointed during the papacy of Pope Gregory XIII as Bishop of Torcello. He served as Bishop of Torcello until his death in 1587.

== External links and additional sources ==
- Cheney, David M. "Diocese of Torcello (Turris)". Catholic-Hierarchy.org. (for Chronology of Bishops) ^{[self-published]}
- Chow, Gabriel. "Titular Episcopal See of Torcello (Italy)". GCatholic.org. (for Chronology of Bishops) ^{[self-published]}

Catholic Church titles
Preceded by Giovanni Delfino	Bishop of Torcello; 1579–1587	Succeeded by Antonio Grimani
