= Giuseppe Callegari =

Catholic cardinal

His Eminence Giuseppe Callegari
- Bishop of Padua
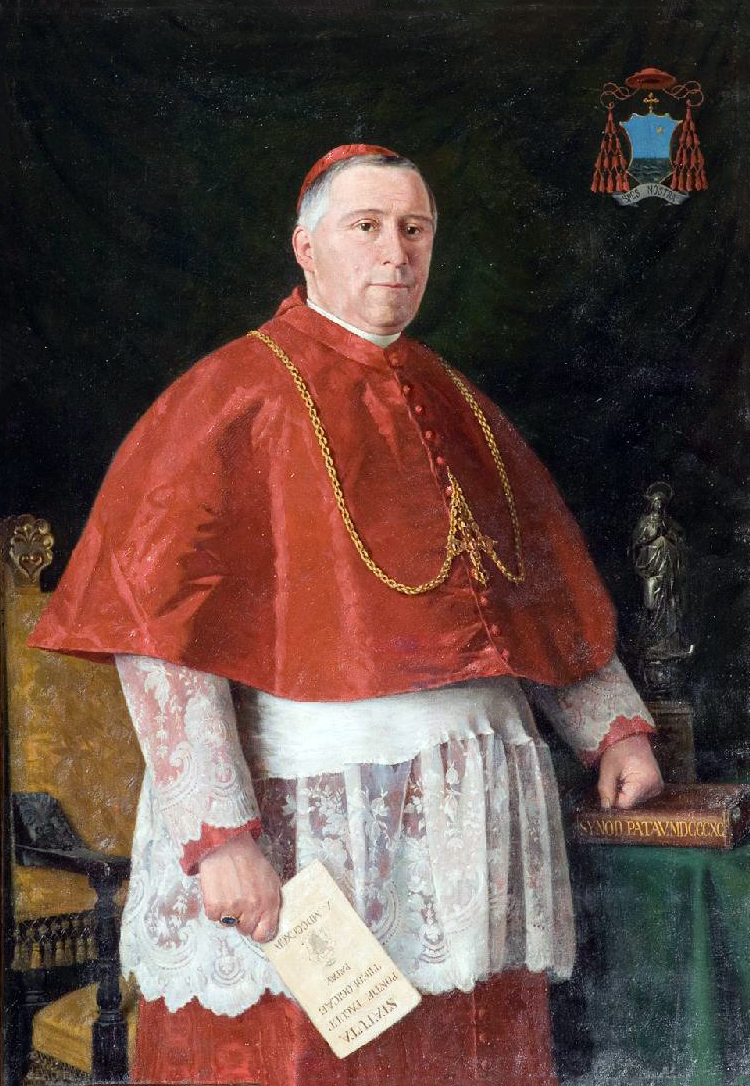
- Portrait by Antonio Ermolao Paoletti. 1895.
- Church: Roman Catholic Church
- Diocese: Padua
- See: Padua
- Appointed: 25 September 1882
- Term ended: 14 April 1906
- Predecessor: Federico Manfredini
- Successor: Luigi Pellizzo
- Other post: Cardinal-Priest pro hac vice of Santa Maria in Cosmedin (1903-06)
- Previous post: Bishop of Treviso (1880-82)

Orders
- Ordination: 26 March 1864 by Giuseppe Luigi Trevisanato
- Consecration: 9 May 1880 by Domenico Agostini
- Created cardinal: 9 November 1903 by Pope Pius X
- Rank: Cardinal-Priest

Personal details
- Born: Giuseppe Callegari; 4 November 1841 Venice, Kingdom of Lombardy–Venetia
- Died: 14 April 1906 (aged 64) Padua, Kingdom of Italy
- Buried: Santuario dell'Arcella
- Parents: Pietro Callegari; Angela Cescutt
- Motto: Spes nostra
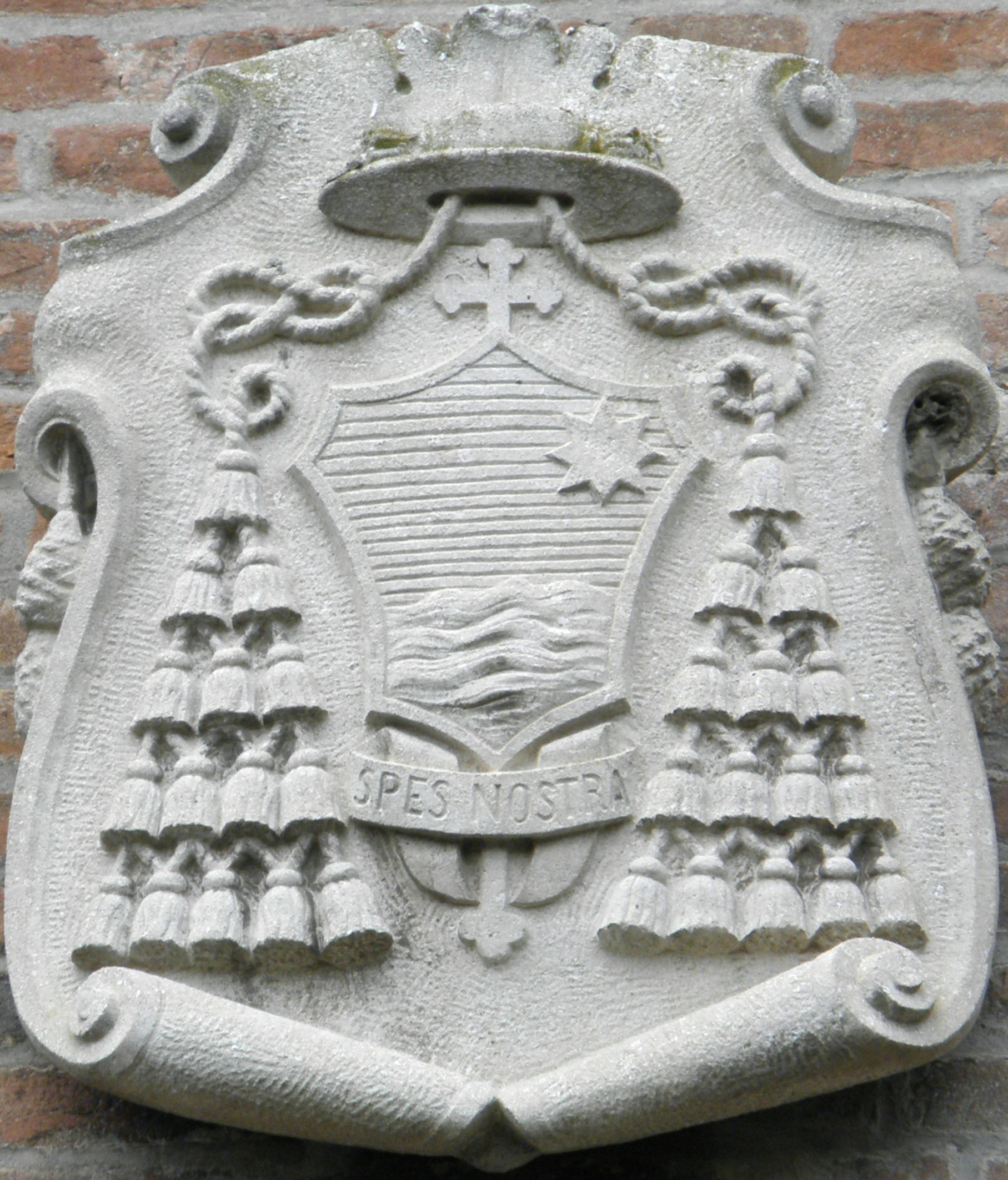
- Coat of arms

Styles of Giuseppe Callegari
- Reference style: His Eminence
- Spoken style: Your Eminence
- Informal style: Cardinal
- See: Padua

Giuseppe Callegari (4 November 1841 – 14 April 1906) was an Italian Cardinal of the Roman Catholic Church who served as Bishop of Treviso from 1880 to 1882 and as Bishop of Padua from 1882 until his death. He was elevated to the cardinalate in 1903.

== Biography ==
Giuseppe Callegari was born in Venice, and received the Sacrament of Confirmation on 23 November 1851. He studied at the Patriarchal Seminary of Venice, receiving the clerical tonsure on 18 December 1858 and the diaconate on 19 December 1863. Callegari was ordained to the priesthood on 26 March 1864 and then served as professor of the secondary-school courses and of moral theology (1865–1873) at the patriarchal seminary. He did pastoral work in Venice from 1865 to 1880 as well, and was named counselor of its ecclesiastical tribunal in 1878 and later its prosynodal examiner. A contributing writer to Il Veneto Cattolico, he became a very close friend of Giuseppe Sarto, the future Pope Pius X.

On 28 February 1880, Pope Leo XIII appointed Callegari as Bishop of Treviso, to succeed the recently deceased Federico Maria Zinelli. He was granted a Papal dispensation for not holding a degree. He received his episcopal consecration on the following 11 March from Patriarch Domenico Agostini, with Bishops Giovanni Berengo and Giuseppe Apollonio serving as co-consecrators, in St Mark's Basilica. He was given the title of Assistant at the Pontifical Throne on 24 August 1882 and named Bishop of Padua on 25 September that year, whilst retaining the administration of Treviso until the appointment of his successor.

In 1892, Callegari was offered the patriarchate of Venice but declined, recommending Bishop Giuseppe Sarto instead. He also served as President of Società Scientifica dei Cattolici Italiani. Sarto, having been elected Pope on 4 August 1903, created Callegari Cardinal Priest of Santa Maria in Cosmedin in his first consistory, on the following 9 November.

He died in Padua at age 64. He is buried in the shrine of Arcella.

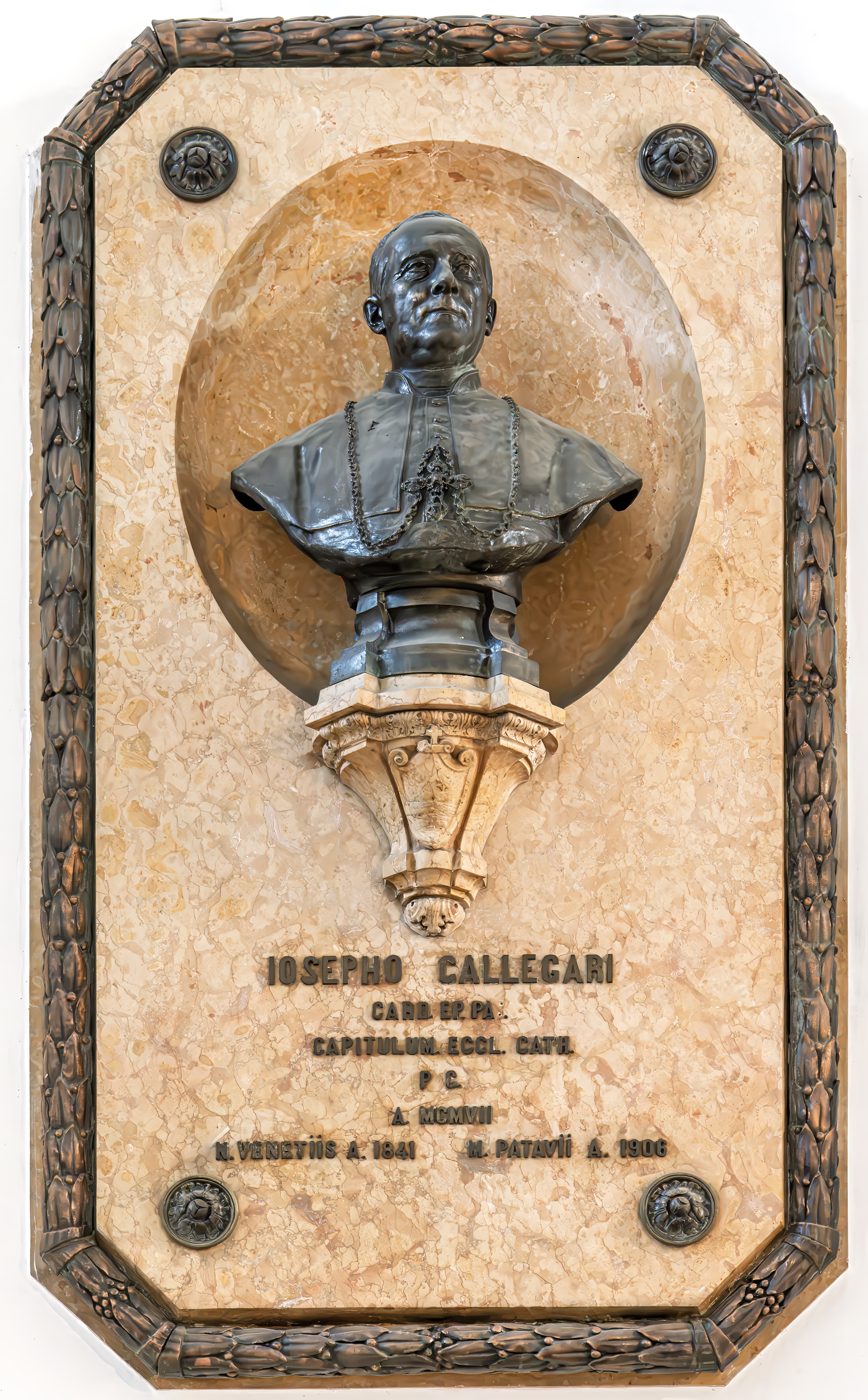
Monument to Giuseppe Callegari in Padua Cathedral

Catholic Church titles
| Preceded by Federico Zinelli | Bishop of Treviso; 1880–1882 | Succeeded by Giuseppe Apollonio |
| Preceded by Federico Manfredini | Bishop of Padua; 1882–1906 | Succeeded by Luigi Pellizzo |
