= Giorgio Cornaro (bishop of Treviso) =

Venetian Roman Catholic prelate

Most Reverend Giorgio Cornaro
- Bishop of Treviso
- Church: Catholic Church
- Diocese: Diocese of Treviso
- In office: 1538–1577
- Predecessor: Francesco Pisani
- Successor: Francesco Cornaro (iuniore)
- Previous post: Apostolic Nuncio to Florence (1561–1565)

Orders
- Consecration: 1552 by Francesco Pisani

Personal details
- Born: 26 February 1524 Venice, Italy
- Died: 1578 (age 53) Treviso, Italy

Giorgio Cornaro (1524–1578) was a Venetian Roman Catholic prelate who served as Bishop of Treviso (1538–1577) and Apostolic Nuncio to Florence (1561–1565).

== Biography ==
Giorgio Cornaro was born in Venice, Italy on 26 February 1524. In 20 February 1538, he was appointed during the papacy of Pope Paul III as Bishop of Treviso.

On 1552, he was consecrated bishop by Francesco Pisani, Bishop of Padua. On 13 January 1561, he was appointed during the papacy of Pope Pius IV as Apostolic Nuncio to Florence. On 8 February 1565, he resigned as Apostolic Nuncio to Florence. He served as Bishop of Treviso until his resignation on 29 November 1577.

He died in 1578.

== External links and additional sources ==
- Cheney, David M. "Nunciature to Florence (Tuscany)". Catholic-Hierarchy.org. (for Chronology of Bishops) ^{[self-published]}
- Cheney, David M. "Diocese of Treviso". Catholic-Hierarchy.org. (for Chronology of Bishops) ^{[self-published]}
- Chow, Gabriel. "Diocese of Treviso (Italy)". GCatholic.org. (for Chronology of Bishops) ^{[self-published]}

Catholic Church titles
Preceded by Giovanni Campeggi	Apostolic Nuncio to Florence; 1561–1565	Succeeded by Carlo Cicala
Preceded by Francesco Pisani	Bishop of Treviso; 1538–1577	Succeeded by Francesco Cornaro (iuniore)
