= Domenico Bollani =

Bishop of Brescia

- Bishop of Brescia
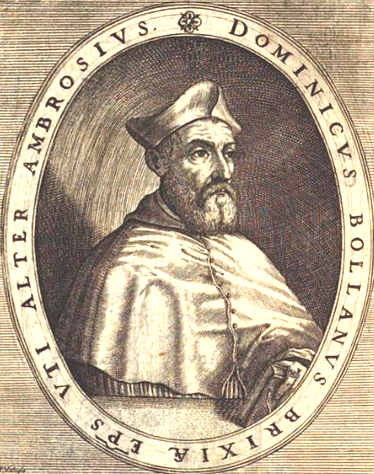
- Church: Catholic Church
- See: Brescia
- Appointed: 14 March 1559
- Term ended: 12 August 1579
- Predecessor: Durante Duranti
- Successor: Giovanni Dolfin

Orders
- Consecration: 11 June 1559 (Bishop)

Personal details
- Born: 10 February 1514 Venice
- Died: 12 August 1579 (aged 65) Brescia
- Buried: Old Cathedral of Brescia

Domenico Bollani (1514–1579) was a diplomat and politician of the Republic of Venice, and as Bishop of Brescia from 1559 to 1579 he was a leading figure of the Catholic reform.

== Political career ==
Domenico Bollani was born to a noble family in Venice on 10 February 1514, or in 1513 according to other sources. He earned a doctorate of Law at the University of Padova and he took a political career in the Republic of Venice He was elected in the Consiglio dei Pregadi (the Senate) and he held also the office as one of the Savi di Terraferma (an office comparable to a minister).

In 1547, he was appointed ambassador to England. Returned to Venice, in 1551, he served in the Council of Ten. In 1556, he was appointed lieutenant (governor) of Friuli, where he successfully managed a crisis due to famine and plague: an arch in Udine (the Arco Bollani built in 1556 and attributed to Andrea Palladio) remembers his activity.

In 1558, he was appointed as podestà (governor) of Brescia, where he was able to settle a dispute with the near Duchy of Milan for the use of the waters of Oglio river.

== Ecclesiastic career ==
Even if he was not an ecclesiastic, he was proposed as the new bishop of Brescia by the citizen of the town, and this candidature was approved by both the Republic of Venice and by Pope Paul IV who formally appointed him on 14 March 1559. He was ordained priest in Brescia in the spring of 1559, and consecrated bishop on 11 June of the same year in the Cathedral of Brescia by his general vicar Vincenzo Durante bishop of Termoli.

Domenico Bollani participated in the final stages of the Council of Trent, and he was ready to implement the consequent reform in his diocese. Following the requests of the council, he founded the seminary in 1568, he gathered a diocesan synod in 1574 and was anxious to personally visit the parishes of the diocese of Brescia. When in 1577 the plague spread in the city, in a moment's hesitation he left the town, then he chose to return to take care of the sick, following the example of Charles Borromeo. In 1567 he completed the construction of the new Bishop's Palace in Brescia, which started almost a century before.

He died in Brescia on 12 August 1579 in the arms of Charles Borromeo. He was buried in the Cathedral of Brescia.

Catholic Church titles
| Preceded by Durante Duranti | Bishop of Brescia; 1559–1579 | Succeeded by Giovanni Delfino |
