= Giovanni Delfino (bishop of Brescia) =

Roman Catholic prelate

Most Reverend Giovanni Delfino
- Bishop of Brescia
- Church: Catholic Church
- Diocese: Diocese of Brescia
- In office: 1579–1584
- Predecessor: Domenico Bollani
- Successor: Gianfrancesco Morosini
- Previous post: Bishop of Torcello (1563–1579)

Personal details
- Born: 30 May 1529 Venice, Republic of Venice
- Died: 1 May 1584 (aged 54) Brescia, Republic of Venice

Giovanni Delfino (30 May 1529 – 1 May 1584) was a Roman Catholic prelate who served as Bishop of Brescia (1579–1584), Apostolic Nuncio to Emperor (1571–1577), and Bishop of Torcello (1563–1579).

== Biography ==
Giovanni Delfino was born in Venice, Republic of Venice on 30 May 1529. On 3 January 1563, he was appointed during the papacy of Pope Pius IV as Bishop of Torcello. On 29 May 1571, he was appointed during the papacy of Pope Pius V as Apostolic Nuncio to Emperor, a position he held until December 1577. On 26 August 1579, he was appointed during the papacy of Pope Gregory XIII as Bishop of Brescia. He served as Bishop of Brescia until his death on 1 May 1584in Brescia, Republic of Venice.

While bishop, he was the principal consecrator of Lambert Gruter, Bishop of Wiener Neustadt (1574) and the principal co-consecrator of Tommaso Sperandio Corbelli, Bishop of Trogir (1567).

== External links and additional sources ==
- Cheney, David M. "Diocese of Torcello (Turris)". Catholic-Hierarchy.org. (for Chronology of Bishops) ^{[self-published]}
- Chow, Gabriel. "Titular Episcopal See of Torcello (Italy)". GCatholic.org. (for Chronology of Bishops) ^{[self-published]}
- Cheney, David M. "Nunciature to Emperor (Germany)". Catholic-Hierarchy.org. (for Chronology of Bishops) ^{[self-published]}
- Cheney, David M. "Diocese of Brescia". Catholic-Hierarchy.org. (for Chronology of Bishops) ^{[self-published]}
- Chow, Gabriel. "Diocese of Brescia (Italy)". GCatholic.org. (for Chronology of Bishops) ^{[self-published]}

Catholic Church titles
Preceded by Girolamo Foscari	Bishop of Torcello; 1563–1579	Succeeded by Carlo Pisani
Preceded by	Apostolic Nuncio to Emperor; 1571–1577	Succeeded by Orazio Malaspina
Preceded by Domenico Bollani	Bishop of Brescia; 1579–1584	Succeeded by Gianfrancesco Morosini
