= Antonio Mistrorigo =

Italian Catholic bishop

- Bishop of Treviso (Emeritus)
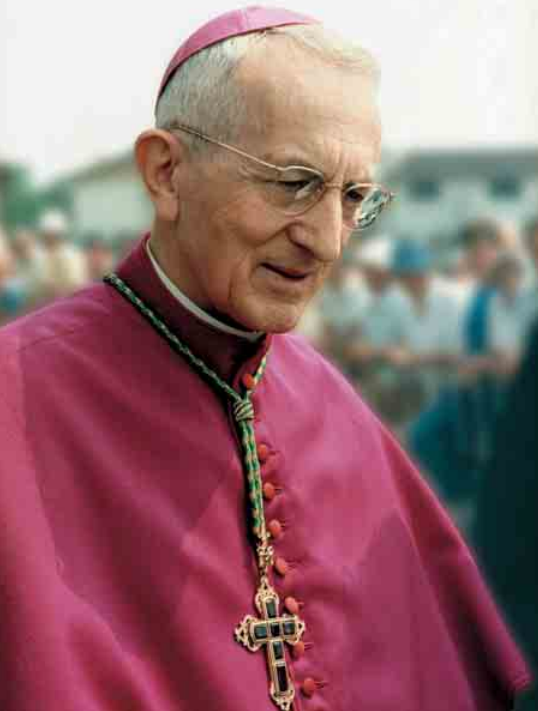
- Church: Roman Catholic Church
- See: Treviso
- In office: 1958 - 1988
- Predecessor: Egidio Negrin
- Successor: Paolo Magnani
- Previous post: Bishop of Lucera-Troia

Orders
- Ordination: 7 July 1935
- Consecration: 25 April 1955

Personal details
- Born: 26 March 1912 Chiampo, Italy
- Died: 14 January 2012 (aged 99) Treviso, Italy

Antonio Mistrorigo (26 March 1912 – 14 January 2012) was an Italian prelate of the Roman Catholic Church. At the time of his death, he was the oldest Italian bishop as well as one of the oldest Catholic bishops.

== Biography ==
Mistrorigo was born in Chiampo, Italy and was ordained a priest on 7 July 1935. Mistrorigo was appointed Bishop of Lucera-Troia (formerly the diocese of Troia) on 9 March 1955 and received his episcopal consecration on 25 April 1955. On 25 June 1958, he was appointed Bishop of Treviso and served Treviso until his retirement on 19 November 1988.

He had authored several books including "L'arte Sacra: Dizionario Dai Documenti Del Concilio Vaticano II E Del Postconcilio" and "Il Credente Del Terzo Millennio".
