= Alvise Molino =

Italian Roman Catholic bishop (died 1604)

Most Reverend Alvise Molino
- Archbishop (Personal Title) of Treviso
- Church: Catholic Church
- Diocese: Diocese of Treviso
- In office: 1595–1604
- Predecessor: Francesco Cornaro (iuniore)
- Successor: Francesco Giustiniani
- Previous post: Archbishop of Zadar (1592–1595)

Personal details
- Died: 1604 Treviso, Italy

Alvise Molino (died 1604) was a Roman Catholic prelate who served as Archbishop (Personal Title) of Treviso (1595–1604) and Archbishop of Zadar (1592–1595).

== Biography ==
Alvise Molino was born in Venice, Italy. On 6 Nov 1592, he was appointed during the papacy of Pope Clement VIII as Archbishop of Zadar. On 13 November 1595, he was appointed during the papacy of Pope Clement VIII as Archbishop (Personal Title) of Treviso. He served as Bishop of Treviso until his death in 1604.

== External links and additional sources ==
- Cheney, David M. "Archdiocese of Zadar (Zara)". Catholic-Hierarchy.org. (for Chronology of Bishops) ^{[self-published]}
- Chow, Gabriel. "Archdiocese of Zadar (Croatia)". GCatholic.org. (for Chronology of Bishops) ^{[self-published]}
- Cheney, David M. "Diocese of Treviso". Catholic-Hierarchy.org. (for Chronology of Bishops) ^{[self-published]}
- Chow, Gabriel. "Diocese of Treviso (Italy)". GCatholic.org. (for Chronology of Bishops) ^{[self-published]}

Catholic Church titles
Preceded by Alvise Baroccia	Archbishop of Zadar; 1592–1595	Succeeded by Minuccio Minucci
Preceded by Francesco Cornaro (iuniore)	Archbishop (Personal Title) of Treviso (1595–1604); 1595–1604	Succeeded by Francesco Giustiniani
