= Pietro Riario =

Italian cardinal and Papal diplomat (1445–1474)

Pietro Riario O.F.M. Conv.
- Archbishop of Firenze
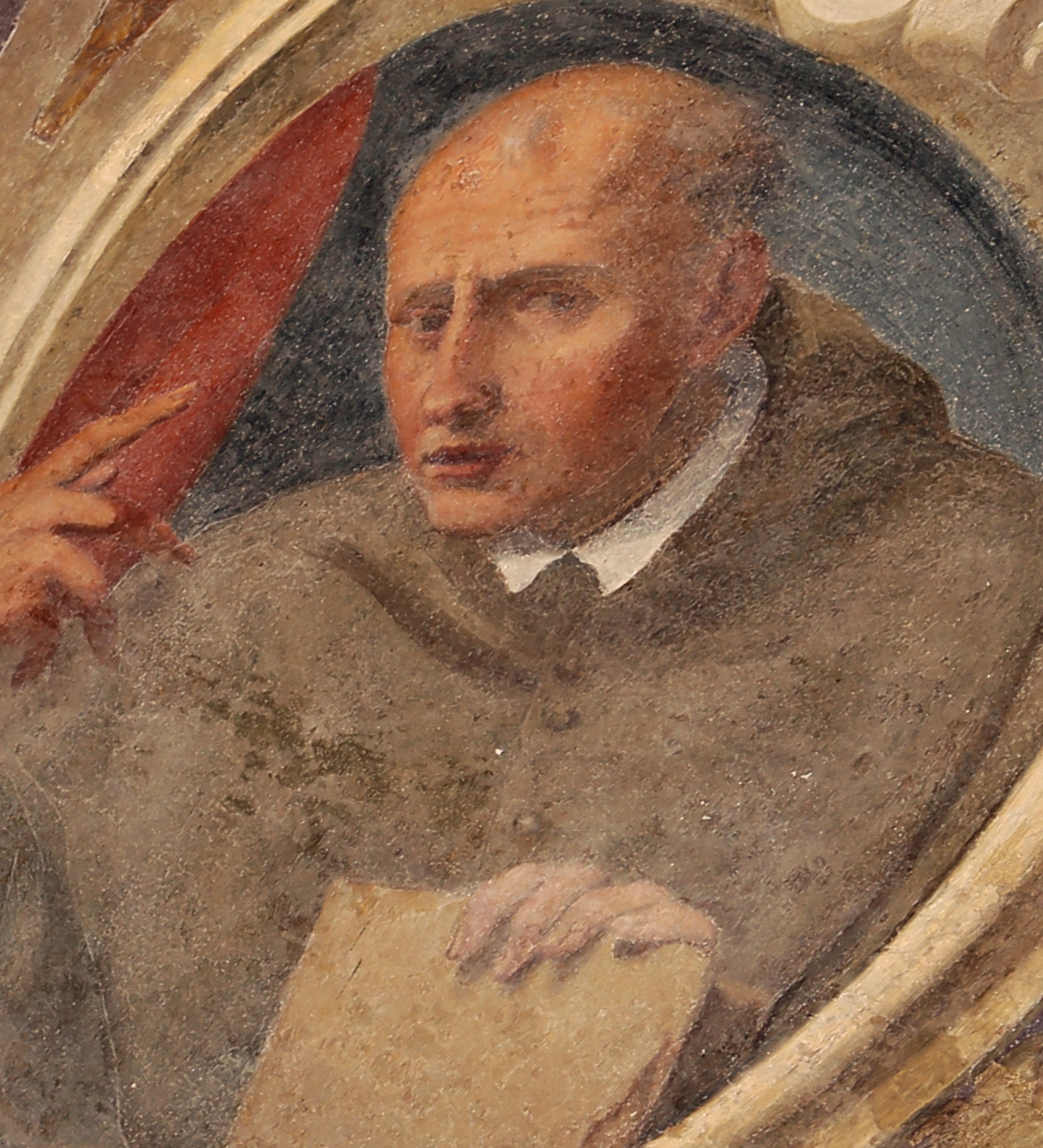
- Church: Catholic Church
- Archdiocese: Archdiocese of Firenze
- In office: 20 July 1473 – 3 January 1474
- Predecessor: Giovanni de' Diotisalvi
- Successor: Rinaldo Orsini
- Other posts: Administrator of Mende & Sevilla(1473-1474); Bishop of Split (1473-1474); Titular Patriarch of Constantinople (1472-1474); Administrator of Valence and Die (1472-1474); Cardinal-Priest of San Sisto (1471-1474)
- Previous post: Bishop of Treviso (1471-1473)

Orders
- Consecration: 1473
- Created cardinal: 16 December 1471 by Pope Sixtus IV

Personal details
- Born: 21 April 1445 Free Commune of Savona, Holy Roman Empire
- Died: 3 January 1474 (aged 28) Rome, Papal States

Pietro Riario (1445 – 3 January 1474) was an Italian cardinal and Papal diplomat.

== Biography ==
Born in Savona, Riario was the son of Paolo Riario and Pope Sixtus IV's sister, Bianca Della Rovere. Sixtus nominated him bishop of Treviso and cardinal in 1471, and, in 1473, archbishop of Florence. He was entrusted with Sixtus' foreign policy. To reinforce the alliance between Rome and Milan, he had his brother Girolamo married to the daughter of Galeazzo Maria Sforza, Duke of Milan.

Riario was a humanist known for his patronage of literature and the arts, his huge feasts, luxurious behaviour and irreligious conduct. He had a large palace begun in Rome, near the church of Santi Apostoli (it was completed by his cousin Giuliano della Rovere, pope as Julius II). In 1473 he had the square before his palazzo transformed with painted canvas and wooden construction into temporary but luxurious lodging for Eleanor of Naples the daughter of King Ferrante of Naples, who was entertained in June, as she traveled through Rome on her way to marry Duke Ercole I d'Este of Ferrara, with a Roman reception including an extravagant banquet with forty piatti that included roast stags, herons, the requisite roast peacock, even a roast bear. The bread was gilded.

In 1473 Riario travelled to northern Italy to oversee the cession of Imola from Milan to the Republic of Florence. At his return to Rome, Riario died suddenly in his house at age 28. It was suspected that he had been poisoned, although an indigestion was also possible. He was buried in Santi Apostoli in a magnificent Renaissance tomb sculpted by Mino da Fiesole and Andrea Bregno. His role as Sixtus' collaborator was inherited by his cousin Giuliano della Rovere.

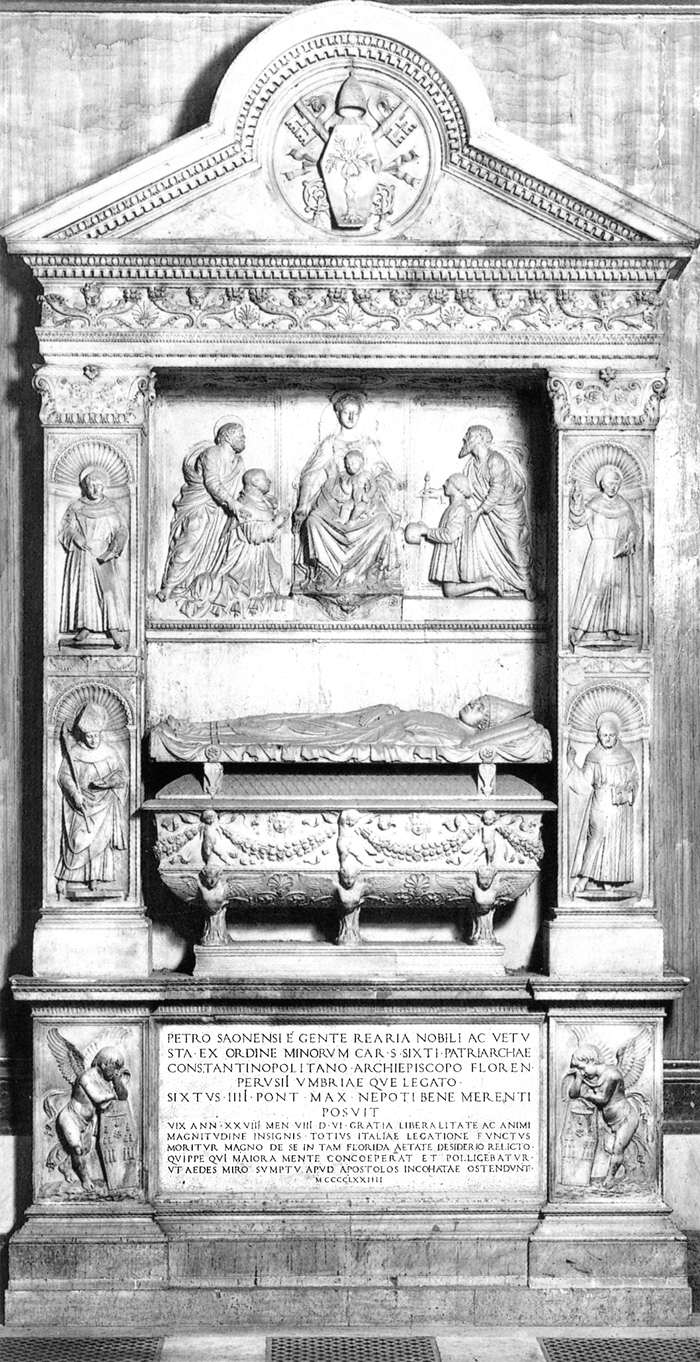
Tomb of Cardinal Pietro Riario in Santi Apostoli

== Notes ==
Catholic Church titles
Preceded by Francesco Barozzi (bishop)	Bishop of Treviso; 1471–1472	Succeeded by Lorenzo Zanni
Preceded by Gerard de Crussol	Administrator of Valence and Die; 1472–1474	Succeeded by
Preceded by Basilios Bessarion	Patriarch of Constantinople; 1472–1474	Succeeded by Girolamo Landi
Preceded by Lorenzo Zanni	Bishop of Split; 1473–1474	Succeeded by Giovanni Dacri
Preceded by Alonso de Fonseca y Ulloa	Archbishop of Seville; 1473–1474	Succeeded by Pedro González de Mendoza
Preceded by Antoine de La Panouse	Administrator of Mende; 1473–1474	Succeeded by Giuliano della Rovere
Preceded by Giovanni Neroni Diotisalvi	Archbishop of Firenze; 1473–1474	Succeeded by Rinaldo Orsini (archbishop)
