= Giovanni Dacri =

Most Reverend Giovanni Dacri
- Bishop of Treviso
- Church: Catholic Church
- Diocese: Diocese of Treviso
- In office: 1478–1485
- Predecessor: Lorenzo Zanni
- Successor: Niccolò Franco

Personal details
- Died: 15 February 1485

Giovanni Dacri, O.F.M. (died 1485) was a Roman Catholic prelate who served as Bishop of Treviso (1478–1485) and Archbishop of Split (1474–1478).

== Biography ==
Giovanni Dacri was ordained a priest in the Order of Friars Minor. On 19 May 1469, he was appointed as Minister General of Order of Friars Minor. In 1474, he was appointed during the papacy of Pope Sixtus IV as Archbishop of Split. On 6 April 1478, he was appointed during the papacy of Pope Sixtus IV as Archbishop (Personal Title) of Treviso. He served as Bishop of Treviso until his death on 15 February 1485.

== External links and additional sources ==
- Cheney, David M. "Archdiocese of Split-Makarska". Catholic-Hierarchy.org. (for Chronology of Bishops) ^{[self-published]}
- Chow, Gabriel. "Metropolitan Archdiocese of Split-Makarska (Croatia)". GCatholic.org. (for Chronology of Bishops) ^{[self-published]}
- Cheney, David M. "Diocese of Treviso". Catholic-Hierarchy.org. (for Chronology of Bishops) ^{[self-published]}
- Chow, Gabriel. "Diocese of Treviso (Italy)". GCatholic.org. (for Chronology of Bishops) ^{[self-published]}

Catholic Church titles
Preceded by Pietro Riario	Archbishop of Split; 1474–1478	Succeeded by Pietro Foscari
Preceded by Lorenzo Zanni	Bishop of Treviso; 1478–1485	Succeeded by Niccolò Franco
