= Paolo Zane =

Roman Catholic prelate

Most Reverend Paolo Zane
- Bishop of Brescia
- Church: Catholic Church
- Diocese: Diocese of Brescia
- In office: 1480–1531
- Predecessor: Lorenzo Zanni
- Successor: Francesco Cornaro (seniore)

Personal details
- Died: March 1531

Paolo Zane (died 1531) was a Roman Catholic prelate who served as Bishop of Brescia (1480–1531).

== Biography ==
On 19 December 1480, Paolo Zane was appointed during the papacy of Pope Sixtus IV as Bishop of Brescia. He served as Bishop of Brescia until his death in March 1531. While bishop, he was the principal co-consecrator of Gianfrancesco Ugoni, Bishop of Famagusta (1530).

== External links and additional sources ==
- Cheney, David M. "Diocese of Brescia". Catholic-Hierarchy.org. (for Chronology of Bishops) ^{[self-published]}
- Chow, Gabriel. "Diocese of Brescia (Italy)". GCatholic.org. (for Chronology of Bishops) ^{[self-published]}

Catholic Church titles
Preceded by Lorenzo Zanni	Bishop of Brescia; 1480–1531	Succeeded by Francesco Cornaro (seniore)
