= Girolamo Foscari =

Roman Catholic prelate

Most Reverend Girolamo Foscari
- Bishop of Torcello
- Church: Catholic Church
- Diocese: Diocese of Torcello
- In office: 1526–1563
- Predecessor: Stefan Teglatije
- Successor: Giovanni Delfino

Orders
- Consecration: 1 May 1542 by Antonio Beccari

Personal details
- Born: 1505 Venice, Italy
- Died: 2 Jan 1563 (age 58) Torcello, Italy

Girolamo Foscari (1505–1563) was a Roman Catholic prelate who served as Bishop of Torcello (1526–1563).

== Biography ==
Girolamo Foscari was born in Venice, Italy in 1505. On 16 May 1526, he was appointed during the papacy of Pope Clement VII as Bishop of Torcello. On 1 May 1542, he was consecrated bishop by Antonio Beccari, Bishop of Shkodrë, with Giorgio Andreasi, Bishop of Chiusi, and Livio Podocathor, Archbishop of Nicosia, serving as co-consecrators. He served as Bishop of Torcello until his death on 2 Jan 1563.

== External links and additional sources ==
- Cheney, David M. "Diocese of Torcello (Turris)". Catholic-Hierarchy.org. (for Chronology of Bishops) ^{[self-published]}
- Chow, Gabriel. "Titular Episcopal See of Torcello (Italy)". GCatholic.org. (for Chronology of Bishops) ^{[self-published]}

Catholic Church titles
Preceded by Stefan Teglatije	Bishop of Torcello; 1526–1563	Succeeded by Giovanni Delfino
