= Teodoro de Lellis =

Most Reverend Teodoro de Lellis
- Bishop of Treviso
- Church: Catholic Church
- Diocese: Diocese of Treviso
- In office: 1464–1466
- Predecessor: Marco Barbo
- Successor: Francesco Barozzi (bishop)
- Previous post: Bishop of Feltre (1462–1464)

Personal details
- Died: 31 March 1466 Treviso, Italy

Teodoro de Lellis or Teodoro Lelli (died 1466) was a Roman Catholic prelate who served as Bishop of Treviso (1464–1466) and Bishop of Feltre (1462–1464).

== Biography ==
On 15 February 1462, Teodoro de Lellis was appointed during the papacy of Pope Pius II as Bishop of Feltre. On 17 September 1464, he was appointed during the papacy of Pope Paul II as Bishop of Treviso. He served as Bishop of Treviso until his death on 31 March 1466.

== External links and additional sources ==
- Cheney, David M. "Diocese of Feltre". Catholic-Hierarchy.org. (for Chronology of Bishops) ^{[self-published]}
- Chow, Gabriel. "Diocese of Feltre (Italy)". GCatholic.org. (for Chronology of Bishops) ^{[self-published]}
- Cheney, David M. "Diocese of Treviso". Catholic-Hierarchy.org. (for Chronology of Bishops) ^{[self-published]}
- Chow, Gabriel. "Diocese of Treviso (Italy)". GCatholic.org. (for Chronology of Bishops) ^{[self-published]}

Catholic Church titles
Preceded by	Bishop of Feltre; 1462–1464	Succeeded by Angelo Fasolo
Preceded by Marco Barbo	Bishop of Treviso; 1464–1466	Succeeded by Francesco Barozzi (bishop)
