= Domenico de' Domenichi =

Roman Catholic prelate

Most Reverend Domenico de' Dominichi
- Bishop of Brescia
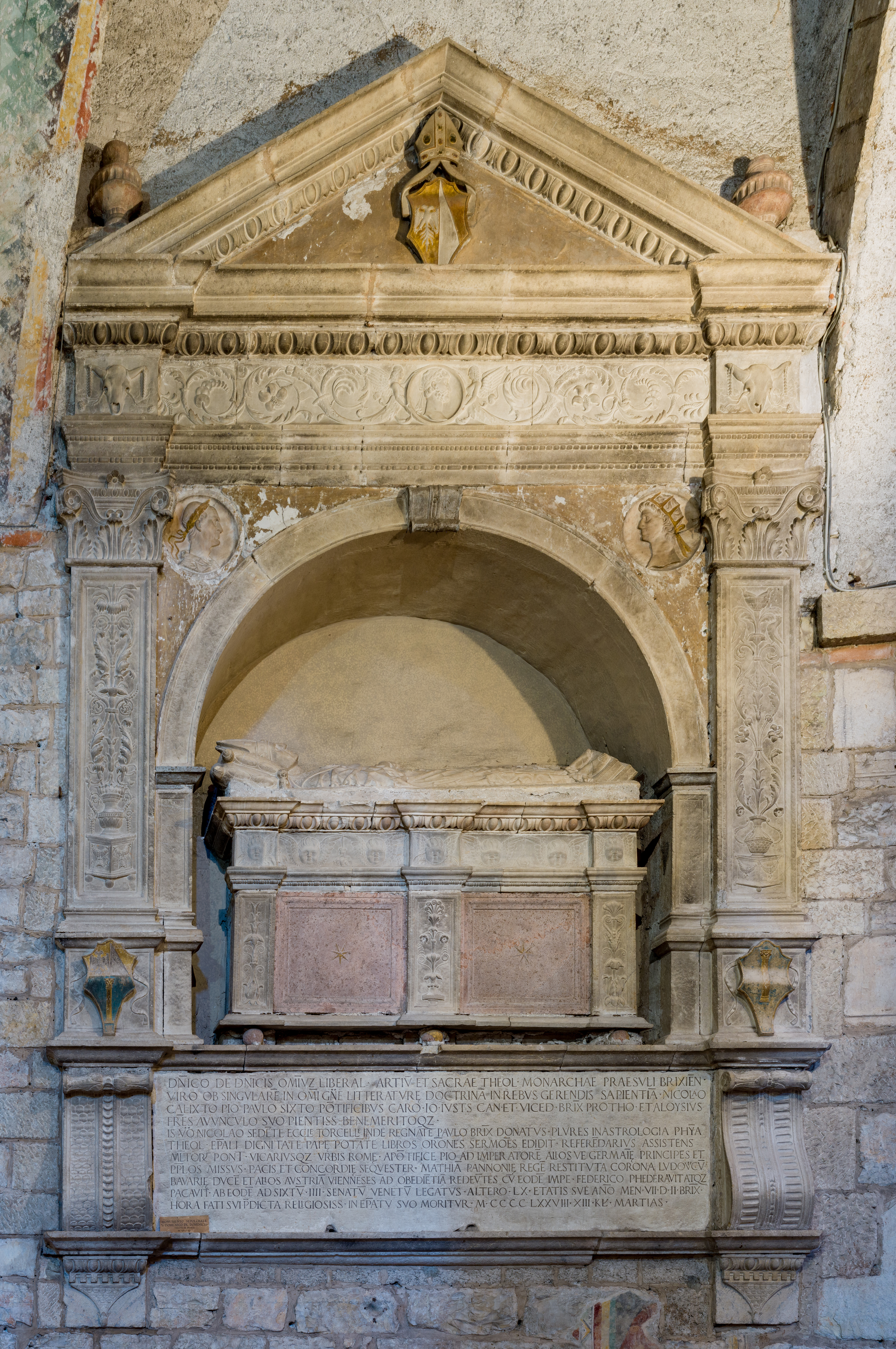
- Tomb of Domenico
- Church: Catholic Church
- Diocese: Diocese of Brescia
- In office: 1464–1478
- Successor: Lorenzo Zanni
- Previous post: Bishop of Torcello (1448–1464)

Personal details
- Died: 1478

Domenico de' Domenichi or Domenico de Dominicis (died 1478) was a Roman Catholic prelate who served as Bishop of Brescia (1464–1478) and Bishop of Torcello (1448–1464).

On 20 February 1448, Domenico de Dominicis was appointed during the papacy of Pope Nicholas V as Bishop of Torcello. On 14 November 1464, he was appointed during the papacy of Pope Paul II as Bishop of Brescia, and as a member of a commission on administrative reform. He served as Bishop of Brescia until his death in 1478. While bishop, he was the principal consecrator of Johannes Hinderbach, Bishop of Trento (1466); and the principal co-consecrator of Giovanni Stefano Botticelli, Bishop of Cremona (1467).

== External links and additional sources ==
- Cheney, David M. "Diocese of Brescia". Catholic-Hierarchy.org. (for Chronology of Bishops) ^{[self-published]}
- Chow, Gabriel. "Diocese of Brescia (Italy)". GCatholic.org. (for Chronology of Bishops) ^{[self-published]}

Catholic Church titles
Preceded by Filippo Paruta	Bishop of Torcello; 1448–1464	Succeeded by Placido Pavanello
Preceded by	Bishop of Brescia; 1464–1478	Succeeded by Lorenzo Zanni
