= Gianfranco Gardin =

Italian Catholic archbishop (1944–2024)

His Excellency Gianfranco Gardin
- Archbishop-Bishop of Treviso
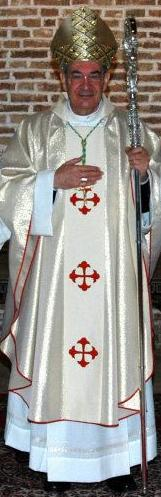
- Metropolis: Venice
- Diocese: Treviso
- Installed: 18 December 2009
- Term ended: 6 July 2019
- Predecessor: Andrea Bruno Mazzocato
- Successor: Michele Tomasi
- Previous posts: Secretary of the Congregation for Institutes of Consecrated Life and Societies of Apostolic Life (2006–2009); Titular Archbishop of Cissa (2006–2007); Titular Archbishop of Torcello (2007–2009)

Orders
- Ordination: 21 March 1970 by Girolamo Bortignon
- Consecration: 26 August 2006 by Angelo Sodano

Personal details
- Born: 15 March 1944 San Polo di Piave, Italy
- Died: 21 June 2024 (aged 80)
- Motto: DOMINI PULCHRITUDINE CORREPTI
- Coat of arms

Styles of Gianfranco Gardin
- Reference style: The Most Reverend
- Spoken style: Your Excellency
- Religious style: Monsignor

Gianfranco Agostino Gardin O.F.M. Conv. (15 March 1944 – 21 June 2024) was an Italian Catholic prelate who was Archbishop-Bishop of Treviso.

== Biography ==
Gardin was born at San Polo di Piave, in the Province of Treviso, Italy. In 1946, when he was about two years old, his family moved to Venice, where he grew up.

He joined the Order of Conventual Franciscan Friars, becoming a solemnly professed member on 4 October 1965. He was ordained a priest on 21 March 1970 and continued his studies in Padua and Rome.

He taught moral theology in Padua from 1973 to 1998. He founded and edited the periodical Credere oggi, whose title means "Believing Today".

In 1988 he became provincial superior of his order and in 1996 117th Minister General, a post he held until 2002.

On 10 July 2006, he was named titular Archbishop of Cissa (transferred to Torcello in November 2007) and Secretary of the Congregation for Institutes of Consecrated Life and Societies of Apostolic Life. He was consecrated bishop on 26 August 2006.

On 18 December 2009, Pope Benedict XVI appointed him Archbishop-Bishop of Treviso.

Gardin died on 21 June 2024, at the age of 80.

Catholic Church titles
Preceded by Andrea Bruno Mazzocato	Bishop of Treviso; 2009–2019	Succeeded by Michele Tomasi
Preceded by Piergiorgio Nesti	Secretary of the Congregation for Institutes of Consecrated Life and Societies of Apostolic Life; 2006–2009	Succeeded by Joseph William Tobin
Preceded by Giovanni Tonucci	Titular Archbishop of Torcello; 2007–2009	Succeeded by Piero Pioppo
Preceded by András Veres	Titular Archbishop of Cissa; 2006–2007	Succeeded by James D. Conley
