= Paolo Magnani =

Italian Roman Catholic bishop (1926–2023)

His Excellency Paolo Magnani
- Bishop Emeritus of Treviso
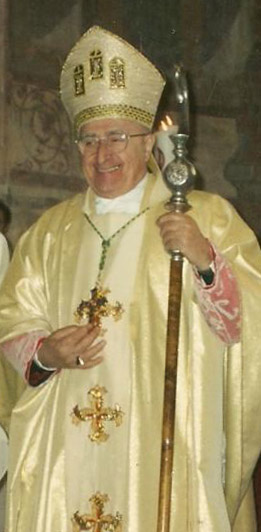
- Magnani in 2006
- Metropolis: Venice
- Diocese: Treviso
- Appointed: 19 November 1988
- Term ended: 3 December 2003
- Predecessor: Antonio Mistrorigo
- Successor: Andrea Bruno Mazzocato
- Previous post: Bishop of Lodi (1977–1988)

Orders
- Ordination: 29 June 1951
- Consecration: 10 September 1977 by Antonio Poma

Personal details
- Born: 31 December 1926 Pieve Porto Morone, Italy
- Died: 5 November 2023 (aged 96) Treviso, Italy

Paolo Magnani (31 December 1926 – 5 November 2023) was an Italian prelate in the Roman Catholic Church who was the emeritus bishop of the Diocese of Treviso.

== Biography ==
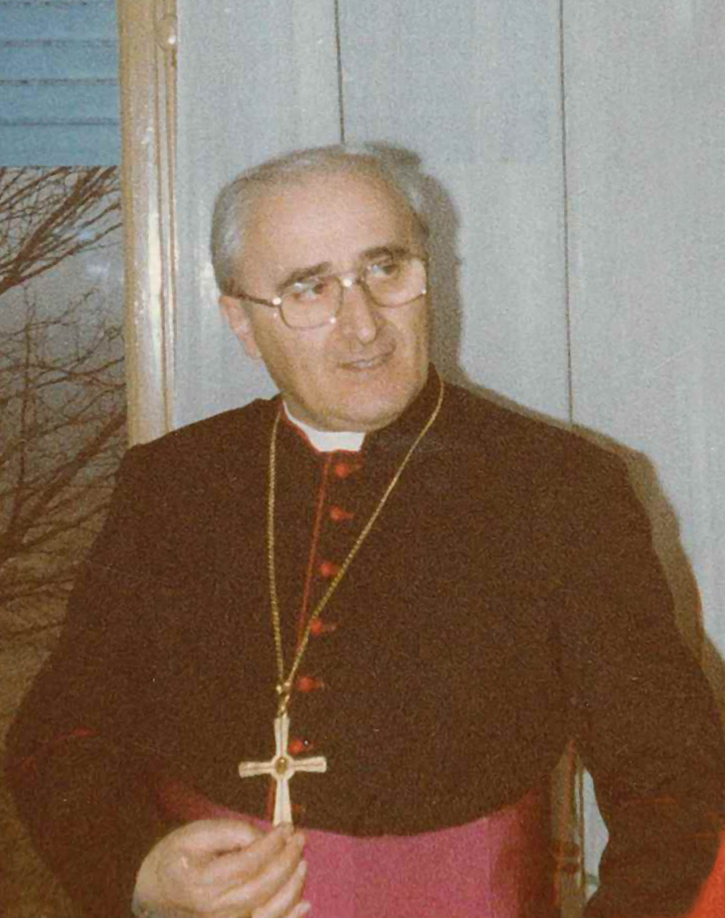
Bishop Magnani in 1982.

Magnani was ordained a priest on 29 June 1951. He was appointed bishop of Lodi on 27 July 1977. Magnani received his episcopal consecration on September 10 following on from cardinal Antonio Poma. He was appointed bishop of Treviso on 19 November 1988 and was installed in the diocese on 11 February 1989. He replaced the previous bishop of Treviso Antonio Mistrorigo and took retirement on 3 December 2003.

Magnani died on 5 November 2023, at the age of 96.

Catholic Church titles
Preceded by Antonio Mistrorigo	Bishop of Treviso; 1988–2003	Succeeded by Andrea Bruno Mazzocato
Preceded by Giulio Oggioni	Bishop of Lodi; 1977–1988	Succeeded by Giacomo Capuzzi
