= Diocese of Torcello =

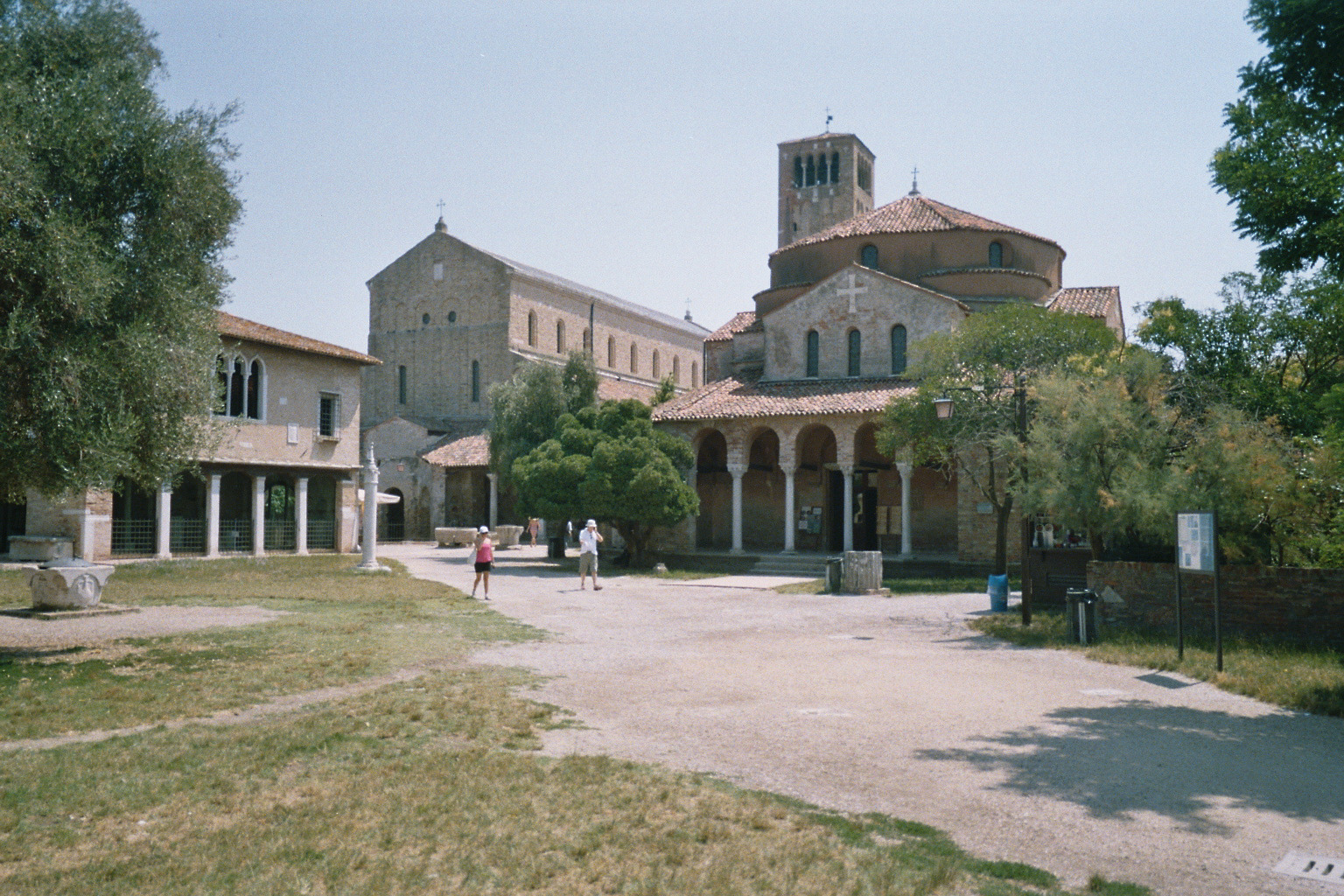
Torcello Cathedral

The Diocese of Torcello or Diocese of Turris (Latin: Dioecesis Torcellanus) was a Roman Catholic diocese located in the town of Torcello in the province of Venice in northeastern Italy. In 1818, it was suppressed to the Patriarchate of Venice.

== History ==
- 639: Established as Diocese of Torcello from the suppressed Diocese of Altino
- 1818 May 01: Suppressed to the Patriarchate of Venice
- 1968: Restored as Titular Episcopal See of Torcello.

== Ordinaries ==
=== Diocese of Torcello ===
Erected: 640
Metropolitan: Patriarchate of Venice

- Geoffroy, OP (20 Jun 1253 – )

...

- Filippo Paruta (2 Apr 1426 – 20 Feb 1448 Appointed, Archbishop of Candia)
- Domenico de Dominicis (20 Feb 1448 – 14 Nov 1464 Appointed, Bishop of Brescia)
- Placido Pavanello (5 Nov 1464 – 1471 Died)
- Simon Contarini (4 Sep 1471 – 1485 Died)
- Stefan Teglatije (de Taleazis) (5 Sep 1485 – 1514 Died)

...

- Girolamo Foscari (16 May 1526 Appointed – 2 Jan 1563 Died)
- Giovanni Delfino (3 Jan 1563 – 26 Aug 1579 Appointed, Bishop of Brescia)
- Carlo Pisani (26 Aug 1579 – 1587 Died)
- Antonio Grimani (26 Oct 1587 – Sep 1618 Resigned)
- Zaccaria della Vecchia (14 May 1618 – 1625 Died)
- Marco Giustiniani (3 Mar 1625 – 27 Oct 1625 Appointed, Bishop of Ceneda)
- Marco Zeno (20 Jul 1626 – 1643 Died)
- Marco Antonio Martinengo (13 Jul 1643 – Jul 1673 Died)
- Giacomo Vianoli (18 Dec 1673 – Nov 1691 Died)
- Marco Giustiniani (24 Mar 1692 – 2 Mar 1735 Died)
- Vincenzo Maria Diedo (14 Mar 1735 – 13 Jul 1753 Died)
- Nicolò Antonio Giustiniani, OSB (26 Nov 1753 – 12 Feb 1759 Appointed, Bishop of Verona)
- Marco Giuseppe Cornaro (Corner) (28 May 1759 – 6 Apr 1767 Appointed, Bishop of Vicenza)
- Giovanni Nani (10 Jul 1767 – 19 Apr 1773 Appointed, Bishop of Brescia)
- Paolo Da Ponte, OCD (13 Sep 1773 – Mar 1792 Died)
- Niccolò Angelo Sagredo (18 Jun 1792 – 16 Aug 1804 Died)

1818 May 01: Suppressed to the Patriarchate of Venice

=== Titular Bishops ===
- Gino Paro † (5 May 1969 - 21 September 1988 dead)
- Giovanni Tonucci (21 October 1989 - 18 October 2007, appointed Territorial prelate of Loreto)
- Gianfranco Agostino Gardin, (1 November 2007 - 18 December 2009, appointed Archbishop, personal title, of Treviso)
- Piero Pioppo, since 25 January 2010
