= Giovanni Antonio Farina =

Italian Roman Catholic saint

Bishop Saint Giovanni Antonio Farina
- Bishop of Vicenza
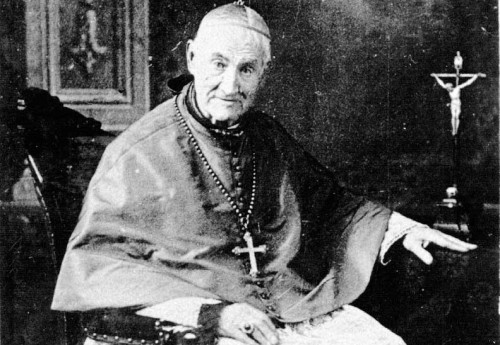
- Diocese: Vicenza
- See: Vicenza
- Appointed: 18 June 1860
- Installed: 16 December 1860
- Term ended: 4 March 1888
- Predecessor: Giovanni Giuseppe Cappellari
- Successor: Antonio Maria De Pol
- Previous post: Bishop of Treviso (1850-1860)

Orders
- Ordination: 15 January 1827
- Consecration: 20 September 1850 by Giovanni Giuseppe Cappellari

Personal details
- Born: 11 January 1803 Gambellara, Veneto, Venetian Province
- Died: 4 March 1888 (aged 85) Vicenza, Veneto, Kingdom of Italy
- Parents: Pietro Farina & Francesca Bellame

Sainthood
- Feast day: 4 March; 14 January (Vicenza)
- Venerated in: Catholic Church
- Beatified: 4 November 2001; Saint Peter's Square, Vatican City by Pope John Paul II
- Canonized: 23 November 2014; Saint Peter's Square, Vatican City by Pope Francis
- Attributes: Bishop's attire
- Patronage: Sisters Teachers of Saint Dorothy, Daughters of the Sacred Hearts; Gambellara; Diocese of Vicenza; Diocese of Treviso

Giovanni Antonio Farina (11 January 1803 – 4 March 1888) was an Italian Catholic bishop known for his compassionate treatment of the poor and for his enlightened views of education; he was sometimes dubbed as the "Bishop of the Poor". He served as the Bishop of Vicenza and later as the Bishop of Treviso; he is also known for ordaining the future Pope Pius X to the priesthood.

He was beatified on 4 November 2001 by Pope John Paul II and was canonized on 23 November 2014 by Pope Francis following the recognition of miracles attributed to his intercession. His liturgical feast day is celebrated annually on 4 March, the date of his death. He remains the patron saint of his religious order and of his hometown as well as the dioceses in which he served.

== Biography ==
=== Early life and family ===
Giovanni Antonio Farina was born in Gambellara in the Venetian Province to Pietro Farina (30 January 1768 - 22 September 1824) and Francesca Bellame. Farina had ten siblings: Giacomo (b. 28 March 1792), Teresa (b. 17 March 1793), Gio Batta (b. 6 January 1795), Maddalena (b. 30 January 1796), Girolamo (b. 14 February 1801), Pietro (b. 2 March 1806), Lucia Fortunata-Farina (b. 18 August 1807), Giambattista (b. 18 October 1809), and Palma (b. 17 October 1811).

Following the death of his father in 1824, Farina was mentored by his maternal uncle, Antonio, who was a priest. At the age of 15, he entered the seminary in Vicenza.

=== Ministry ===
At the age of 21, Farina began teaching at the seminary, where he continued to serve for 18 years, and he taught grammar. He was ordained to the priesthood on 15 January 1827 and remained as a teacher at the seminary, and even served as a librarian for a brief period and as a canon of the local cathedral. In the first decade of his priesthood, he served as a chaplain at the parish of San Pietro and was sensitive to the educational needs of its people, in particular, girls and those who were deaf and blind.

In 1831, he founded the first school for poor girls in Vicenza, and on 11 November 1836, the Institute of the Sisters Teachers of Saint Dorothy, Daughters of the Sacred Hearts (Italian: Suore Maestre di Santa Dorotea, figlie dei Sacri Cuori). The Sisters taught at the girls' school and also cared for the sick and the elderly.

On 25 May 1850, Farina was appointed the Bishop of Treviso. He received his episcopal consecration as a bishop on 19 January 1851, by Giovanni Giuseppe Cappellari, the Bishop of Vicenza, assisted by Bernardo Antonino Squarcina, the Bishop of Adria, and Federico Manfredini, the Titular Bishop of Famagusta. He was formally installed in his new diocese on 16 February 1851. On 18 September 1858, Farina ordained a priest Giuseppe Melchiorre Sarto, the future Pope Pius X. On 18 June 1860, Farina was appointed the Bishop of Vicenza, a position he held until his death in 1888, and he was formally installed in his new diocese on the following 16 December. In 1869 and 1870, he attended the First Vatican Council and was among the supporters for the definition of papal infallibility.

He died on 4 March 1888 at the age of 85 from a stroke. He had suffered a serious illness in 1886, and his strength continued to decline until his death. His remains were transferred to the order's motherhouse in 1898. His order received the decree of praise from Pope Gregory XVI on 1 March 1839 and papal approval from Pope Pius X after his death on 2 May 1905. In 2005, there were 1541 religious in a total of 179 houses in nations such as Poland and in Israel.

== Canonization ==
The cause for Farina's beatification started on 1 June 1990 and was therefore titled as a Servant of God. The diocesan process opened in Vicenza and spanned from 9 October 1990 until being closed on 6 February 1992; the Congregation for the Causes of Saints validated the process in Rome on 23 April 1993 and received the Positio dossier from the postulation in 1999. The historians approved the direction of the cause on 22 February 2000, while theologians voiced their approval for the cause on 12 December 2000, as did the C.C.S. on 20 February 2001. On 24 April 2001, he was proclaimed Venerable after Pope John Paul II approved his life of "heroic virtue".

The process for a miracle that led to his beatification spanned from 1985 until 1987 and received validation on 19 January 1996. A medical board approved this on 25 January 2001, as did theologians on 29 May 2001 and the C.C.S. members on 3 July 2001. The pope issued final confirmation for this miracle on 7 July 2001 and deemed it to be a healing attributed to Farina's intercession. John Paul II beatified Farina in Saint Peter's Square on 4 November 2001. 4 March was designated as his annual liturgical feast.

The second miracle had to be approved for him to be sainted, and one such miracle was investigated and then validated on 4 April 2003 before a medical board approved it on 14 April 2005. Theologians also assented to it on 24 January 2006, as did the C.C.S. sometime later on 18 March 2014. Pope Francis signed a decree on 3 April 2014 recognizing a miracle that had been attributed to Farina's intercession and allowed for his canonization to take place. He was canonized - alongside five others - on 23 November 2014 in Saint Peter's Square.

The postulator at the time of his canonization was Sr. Albarosa Ines Bassani.

== Lineage ==
His paternal grandparents were Girolamo (9 January 1738 - 18 December 1822) and Maddalena Disconzi (1734 - 31 October 1815). His paternal aunts were Pasqua (b. 2 March 1763), Angela (b. 28 August 1778), Antonia (b. 10 January 1766), and Anna (b. 23 February 1770).

His paternal great-grandparents were Francesco (1 May 1701 - 7 February 1779) and Antonia Capitanio. His paternal great-great-grandparents were Sebastiano Farina (b. 2 March 1673) and Pasqua. Farina's paternal great-great-great-grandfather was Sebastiano (b. 1580).
