= Lorenzo Zanni =

Italian Catholic prelate (died 1485)

Most Reverend Lorenzo Zanni
- Bishop Emeritus of Brescia
- Church: Catholic Church
- Diocese: Diocese of Brescia
- In office: 1478–1480
- Predecessor: Domenico de Dominicis
- Successor: Paolo Zane
- Previous posts: Archbishop of Split (1452–1473); Titular Patriarch of Jerusalem (1458–1473); Bishop of Treviso (1473–1478); Titular Patriarch of Antioch (1473–1478)

Personal details
- Died: 15 October 1485 Brescia, Italy

Lorenzo Zanni or Lorenzo Zane (died 1485) was a Catholic prelate who served as Bishop of Brescia (1478–1480), Titular Patriarch of Antioch (1473–1478), Bishop of Treviso (1473–1478), Titular Patriarch of Jerusalem (1458–1473), and Archbishop of Split (1452–1458).

== Biography ==
On 5 June 1452, he was appointed during the papacy of Pope Nicholas V as Archbishop of Split. On 13 March 1458, he was appointed during the papacy of Pope Callixtus III as Titular Patriarch of Jerusalem. On 28 April 1473, he was appointed during the papacy of Pope Sixtus IV as Bishop of Treviso and Titular Patriarch of Antioch. On 27 February 1478, he was appointed during the papacy of Pope Sixtus IV as Bishop of Brescia. He served as Bishop of Brescia until his resignation in 1480. He died on 15 October 1485.

== External links and additional sources ==
- Cheney, David M. "Archdiocese of Split-Makarska". Catholic-Hierarchy.org. (for Chronology of Bishops) ^{[self-published]}
- Chow, Gabriel. "Metropolitan Archdiocese of Split-Makarska (Croatia)". GCatholic.org. (for Chronology of Bishops) ^{[self-published]}
- Cheney, David M. "Patriarchate of Jerusalem {Gerusalemme}". Catholic-Hierarchy.org. (for Chronology of Bishops) ^{[self-published]}
- Chow, Gabriel. "Patriarchal See of Jerusalem (Israel)". GCatholic.org. (for Chronology of Bishops) ^{[self-published]}
- Cheney, David M. "Diocese of Treviso". Catholic-Hierarchy.org. (for Chronology of Bishops) ^{[self-published]}
- Chow, Gabriel. "Diocese of Treviso (Italy)". GCatholic.org. (for Chronology of Bishops) ^{[self-published]}
- Cheney, David M. "Antiochia {Antioch} (Titular See)". Catholic-Hierarchy.org. (for Chronology of Bishops) ^{[self-published]}
- Chow, Gabriel. "Titular Patriarchal See of Antioch (Syria)". GCatholic.org. (for Chronology of Bishops) ^{[self-published]}
- Cheney, David M. "Diocese of Brescia". Catholic-Hierarchy.org. (for Chronology of Bishops) ^{[self-published]}
- Chow, Gabriel. "Diocese of Brescia (Italy)". GCatholic.org. (for Chronology of Bishops) ^{[self-published]}

Catholic Church titles
Preceded by Jacopino Badoer	Archbishop of Split; 1452–1473	Succeeded by Pietro Riario
Preceded by Basilios Bessarion	Titular Patriarch of Jerusalem; 1458–1473	Succeeded by Louis de Haricuria
Preceded by Pietro Riario	Bishop of Treviso; 1473–1478	Succeeded by Giovanni Dacri
Preceded by Gerard de Crussol	Titular Patriarch of Antioch; 1473–1478	Succeeded by Giovanni Michiel
Preceded by Domenico de Dominicis	Bishop of Brescia; 1478–1480	Succeeded by Paolo Zane
