= Diocese of Treviso =

Roman Catholic diocese in Italy

Diocese of Treviso Dioecesis Tarvisina

Catholic
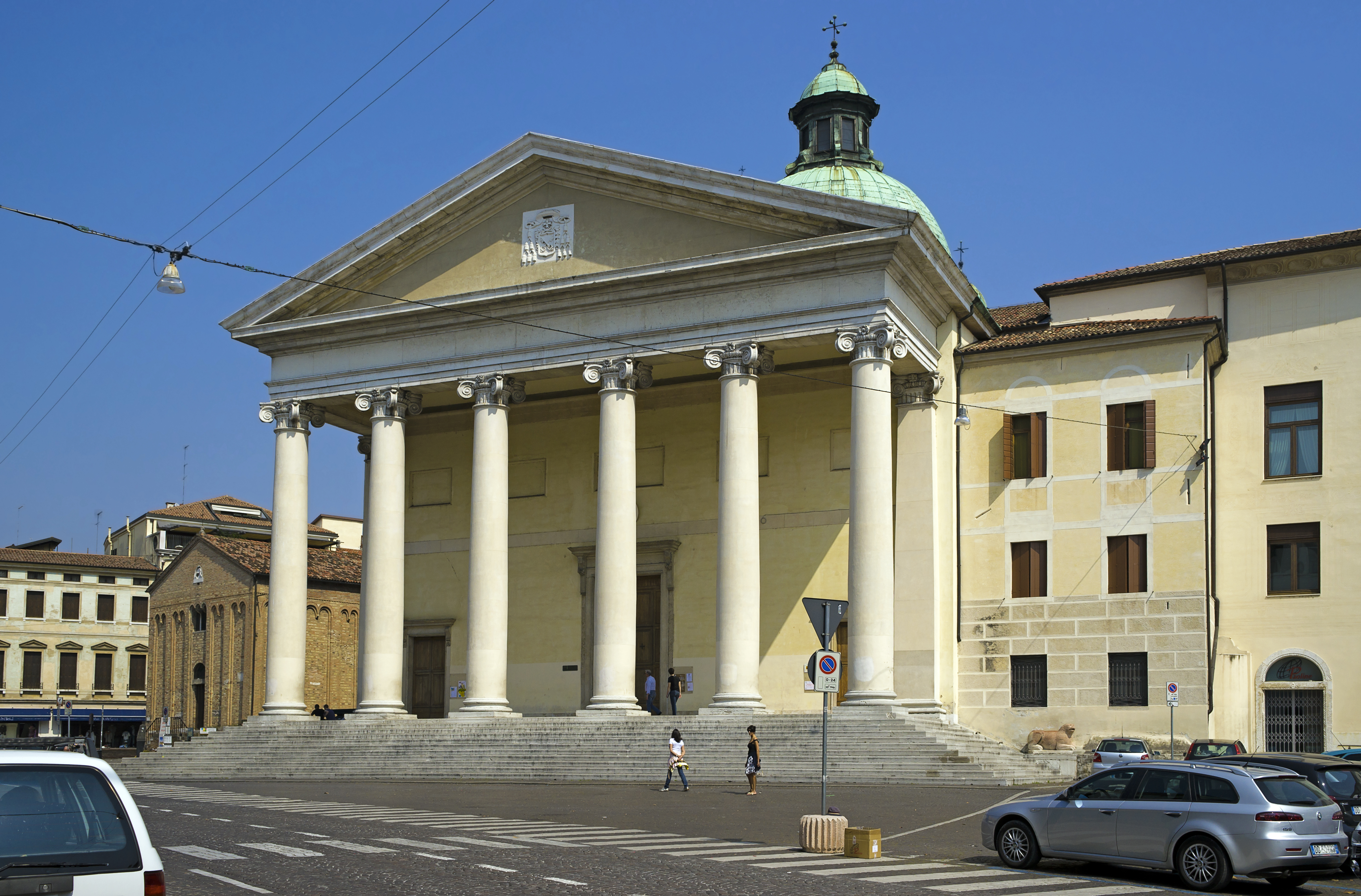
- Treviso Cathedral

Location
- Country: Italy
- Ecclesiastical province: Venice
- Metropolitan: Patriarch of Venice

Statistics
- Area: 2,194 km^{2} (847 sq mi)
- Population: Total; Catholics: (as of 2023); 864,900 (est.) ▼; 760,000 (guess) ▼
- Parishes: 265

Information
- Denomination: Catholic Church
- Sui iuris church: Latin Church
- Rite: Roman Rite
- Established: c. Fifth Century
- Cathedral: Cattedrale di S. Pietro Apostolo
- Secular priests: 350 (diocesan) ▼150 (Religious Orders) ▲26 Permanent Deacons

Current leadership
- Pope: Leo XIV
- Bishop: Michele Tomasi

Map

Website
- www.diocesitv.it (in Italian)

The Diocese of Treviso (Latin: Dioecesis Tarvisina) is Latin Church ecclesiastical territory or diocese of the Catholic Church in the Veneto, Italy. It is a suffragan diocese in the ecclesiastical province of the metropolitan Patriarchate of Venice.

== History ==
Treviso probably was Christianized from Aquileia. The bishops of Treviso who participated, along with all of the other bishops of the ecclesiastical province of Aquileia, in the schism of the Three Chapters were: Felix; Rusticus, present at the pseudo-synodus Maranensis (589); and Felix II, who signed the petition to the Emperor Maurice (591).

Through the intercession of the elder Bishop Felix, the first bishop for whom there is authentic evidence, the city of Treviso was spared during the Lombard invasion of King Alboin (569) and became the seat of a duchy. Charlemagne made the duchy a marquisate, extending from Belluno to Ceneda, and from the Adige to the Tagliamento.

In 922 Treviso, which was under episcopal jurisdiction, was sacked by the Hungarians.

In 905 Bishop Adelbert received from Berengar I of Italy the temporal jurisdiction of the city, which extended to Rozo (969–1001) and Rolando who adhered to the schism of Clement III. Bishop Tiso (1212–1245) suffered from the tyranny of Ezzelino III da Romano, and Alberto Ricco, O. M. (1255), was imprisoned for preaching against him.

Other bishops were:

- Loto Gambacurta (1394), exiled by the Florentines from his archbishopric of Pisa;
- Giovanni Benedetti, O. P. (1418), who reformed many convents of his order and concubinary priests;
- Ludovico Barbo (1437), Abbot of S. Giustina of Padua, and reformer of the Benedictine order;
- Fra Giovanni Dacri (1478), formerly minister general of the Franciscans, who restored the cathedral and reorganized the revenues of the bishopric, leaving many pious foundations;
- Francesco Cornaro (1577), who founded a seminary, introduced the reforms of the Council of Trent, resigned his see, and was created cardinal;
- Bernardino Marini (1788–1817), a canon of the Lateran, present at the Council of Paris, 1811, who united the abbey nullius of Novisa with the See of Treviso
- Giuseppe Giapelli, appointed by the Austrian Government, but not recognized by the Holy See, so that the diocese remained in turmoil until the death of the candidate.

Bishop Giovanni Antonio Farina (1850) conferred sacred orders on Giuseppe Sarto, later Pope Pius X.

=== Consolidation ===
United with Treviso since 1440 is the ancient Diocese of Asolo, the bishops of which are unknown from 587 (Agnellus) until 1049 (Ugo); and the Diocese of Eraclea (diocese of Città Nova), a city founded in the times of the Byzantine emperor Heraclius, as a refuge for the inhabitants of Opitergium (Oderzo), who with their bishop (Magnus) had been exiled by the Lombards. Twenty-six bishops are known, from 814 until the union of the see with Treviso, 1440.

=== Reorganization of 1751 ===
In 1751, pressured both by Austria and Venice, who were exasperated by the numerous discords in the patriarchate of Aquileia, Pope Benedict XIV was compelled to intervene in the ecclesiastical and political disturbances. In the bull "Injuncta Nobis" of 6 July 1751, the patriarchate of Aquileia was completely suppressed, and in its place the Pope created two separate archdioceses, Udine and Goritza. The dioceses which had been suffragans of Aquileia and were under Venetian political control, Treviso among them, were assigned as suffragans of the new archdiocese of Udine.

=== Post-Napoleonic reorganization ===
The violent expansionist military policies of the French Revolutionary Republic had brought confusion and dislocation to the Po Valley. Following the redistribution of European territories at the Congress of Vienna, the Papacy faced the difficult task of restoring and restructuring the Church in various territories, according to the wishes of their rulers. Padua and Venice were under the control of Austria, and therefore a Concordat had to be negotiated with the government of the Emperor Francis. One of the requirements of the Austrian government was the elimination of several metropolitanates and the suppression of a number of bishoprics which were no longer viable due to the bad climate (malaria and cholera) and the impoverishment of the dioceses due to migration and industrialization; it was expected that this would be done to the benefit of the Patriarchate of Venice.

Pope Pius VII, therefore, issued the bull "De Salute Dominici Gregis" on 1 May 1818, embodying the conclusions of arduous negotiations. The metropolitan archbishopric of Udine was abolished and its bishop made suffragan to Venice. The dioceses of Caprularum (Caorle) and Torcella were suppressed and their territories assigned to the Patriarchate of Venice; Belluno and Feltre were united under a single bishop, aeque personaliter, and assigned to Venice; Treviso became a suffragan of Venice.

Bishop Grasser was particularly active in restoring the operation and good order of the diocesan seminary.

=== Chapter and cathedral ===
In 1684, the cathedral Chapter was composed of three dignities and fifteen Canons; two of the Canons were designated the Theologus and the Penitentiarius. In 1750, there were three dignities and eighteen Canons. The dignities were: the Dean, the Archdeacon, and the Primicerius. In 1862, the clergy of the cathedral included: the Dean, the Archdeacon, the Primicerius, and eleven Canons, five of which were vacant.

To the cathedral was annexed the baptistry of S. Giovanni Battista, which was also a parish church. It had been incorporated with the cathedral, and had come under the administration of the Canons in 1188. It was the only baptistry in the city of Treviso and its suburbs until 1809.

== Bishops of Treviso ==
=== to 1200 ===
...
[Joannes (4th cent.]
[Paulinus (c. 350)]
[Titianus (c. 400)]
[Jocundus (c. 421)]
[Helviandus (451, or 452, or 454)]
...

- Felix (attested 569)
- Rusticus (attested 589)
- Felix (attested 591)

...

- Adalberisus (attested 967–968)
- Rozo (attested 969–1000)
- Amelricus (attested 1006–1015)
- Arnaldus (attested 1021–1023)
- Rotharius (attested 1026–1031)

...

- Rotharius II (attested 1046–1065)
- Wolfram (attested 1065–1069)
- Accelinus (attested 1070–1073)
- Rolandus (attested 1073–1089)
- Gumpoldus (attested 1096–1116)
- Almericus
- Gregorius
- Bonifacius
- Blancus
- Udalricus
- Petrus Foscari, O.Min.
- Conradus
- Henricus (1197–1199)

=== 1200 to 1500 ===
- Ambrosius (1199–1209)
- Tiso (1210–1245)
- Gualterius, O.P. (attested 1251–1255)
- Albertus Ricco, O.Min. (1255–c.1275)
- Prosavius Novello (1279– ? )
- Tolbertus Calza (attested 1290)
- Pandulfus (attested 1306)
- Castellanus (attested 1309–1322)
- Ubaldus Gabrieli, O.S.B. (1323–1336)
- Petrus Pauli (1336–1352)
- Joannes Malabaila (1352–1355)
- Azo de Manzis (1355–1357)
- Pietro Pileo di Prata (1358–1359)
- Petrus de Barono (1359– ? )
- Angelus (c. 1380)
- Nicolaus Beruti, O.E.S.A. (1385–1394)
- Lottus Gambacurta (1394–1409)
- Jacobus de Tervisio (1409−1416)
- Giovanni Benedetti, O.P. (1418−1437)
- Lodovico Barbo, O.S.B. (1437–1443)
- Ermolao Barbo (seniore) (1443–1453)
- Marino Contarini (1453–1455 Died)
- Marco Barbo (1455–1464)
- Teodoro de Lellis (1464–1466)
- Francesco Barozzi (1466–1471)
- Cardinal Pietro Riario, O.F.M. Conv. (1471–1473)
- Lorenzo Zanni (Zane) (1473–1478)
- Giovanni Dacri, O.F.M. (1478–1485)
- Niccolò Franco (1485–1499)

=== 1500 to 1800 ===
- Bernardo de' Rossi (1499–1527)
- Cardinal Francesco Pisani (1528–1538 Resigned) Administrator
- Giorgio Cornaro (1538–1577 Resigned)
- Francesco Cornaro (iuniore) (1577–1595 Resigned)
- Alvise Molino (1595–1604)
- Francesco Giustiniani (1605–1623 Resigned)
- Vincenzo Giustiniani (1623–1633)
- Silvestro Morosini (1633–1639)
- Marco Morosini (1639–1645)
- Antonio Lupi (1645–1668)
- Bartolomeo Gradenigo (1668–1682)
- Giovanni Battista Sanudo (1684–1709)
- Fortunato Morosini, O.S.B. (1710–1723)
- Augusto Antonio Zacco (1723–1739)
- Benedetto De Luca (1739–1750)
- Paolo Francesco Giustiniani, O.F.M. Cap. (1750–1788 Retired)
- Bernardino Marin, C.R.L. (1788–1817)

=== Since 1800 ===
Sede vacante (1818–1822)

- Giuseppe Grasser (1822–1828)
- Sebastiano Soldati (1829–1849)
- Giovanni Antonio Farina (1850–1860)
- Federico Maria Zinelli (1861–1879)
- Giuseppe Callegari (1880–1882, Bishop of Padua})
- Giuseppe Apollonio (1882–1903)
- Andrea Giacinto Bonaventura Longhin, O.F.M. Cap. (1904–1936)
- Antonio Mantiero (1936–1956)
- Egidio Negrin (1956–1958)
- Antonio Mistrorigo (1958–1988 Retired)
- Paolo Magnani (1988–2003 Retired)
- Andrea Bruno Mazzocato (2003–2009)
- Gianfranco Agostino Gardin, O.F.M. Conv. (2009–2019)
- Michele Tomasi (2019 – )

== See also ==
- Timeline of Treviso

== Books ==
=== General references for bishops ===
- Gams, Pius Bonifatius (1873). Series episcoporum Ecclesiae catholicae: quotquot innotuerunt a beato Petro apostolo (in Latin). Ratisbon: Typis et Sumptibus Georgii Josephi Manz. pp. 803–804.
- Eubel, Conradus, ed. (1913). Hierarchia catholica (in Latin). Vol. Tomus I (second ed.). Münster: Libreria Regensbergiana.
- Eubel, Conradus, ed. (1914). Hierarchia catholica (in Latin). Vol. Tomus II (second ed.). Münster: Libreria Regensbergiana.
- Eubel, Conradus; Gulik, Guilelmus, eds. (1923). Hierarchia catholica (in Latin). Vol. Tomus III (second ed.). Münster: Libreria Regensbergiana.
- Gauchat, Patritius (Patrice) (1935). Hierarchia catholica (in Latin). Vol. Tomus IV (1592-1667). Münster: Libraria Regensbergiana.
- Ritzler, Remigius; Sefrin, Pirminus (1952). Hierarchia catholica medii et recentis aevi (in Latin). Vol. Tomus V (1667-1730). Patavii: Messagero di S. Antonio.
- Ritzler, Remigius; Sefrin, Pirminus (1958). Hierarchia catholica medii et recentis aevi. Vol. Tomus VI (1730-1799). Patavii: Messagero di S. Antonio.
- Ritzler, Remigius; Sefrin, Pirminus (1968). Hierarchia Catholica medii et recentioris aevi (in Latin). Vol. VII (1800–1846). Monasterii: Libreria Regensburgiana.
- Remigius Ritzler; Pirminus Sefrin (1978). Hierarchia catholica Medii et recentioris aevi (in Latin). Vol. VIII (1846–1903). Il Messaggero di S. Antonio.
- Pięta, Zenon (2002). Hierarchia catholica medii et recentioris aevi (in Latin). Vol. IX (1903–1922). Padua: Messagero di San Antonio. ISBN 978-88-250-1000-8.

=== Studies ===
- Stato personale del clero della città e diocesi di Treviso per l' anno 1862 (in Italian). Treviso: Tipografia Andreala. 1862.
- Bonora, Lucio (1994). Diocesi di Treviso (in Italian). Venice: Giunta regionale del Veneto. pp. 141–152. ISBN 978-88-7706-142-3.
- Cappelletti, Giuseppe (1854). Le chiese d'Italia dalla loro origine sino ai nostri giorni (in Italian). Vol. decimo (10). Venezia: G. Antonelli. pp. 599–703.
- Kehr, Paul Fridolin (1923). Italia Pontificia Vol. VII:l Venetiae et Histria, Pars I: Provincia Aquileiensis. Berlin: Weidmann, pp. 153–189. (in Latin).
- Lanzoni, Francesco (1927). Le diocesi d'Italia dalle origini al principio del secolo VII (an. 604). Faenza: F. Lega, pp. 902–904. (in Italian)
- Sartoretto, Antonio (1969). Cronotassi dei vescovi di Treviso (569-1564) (in Italian). Treviso: Crivellari.
- Schwartz, Gerhard (1907). Die Besetzung der Bistümer Reichsitaliens unter den sächsischen und salischen Kaisern: mit den Listen der Bischöfe, 951–1122. Leipzig: B. G. Teubner.
- Ughelli, Ferdinando (1720). Italia Sacra sive De Episcopis Italiae et insularum adjacentium (in Latin). Vol. Tomus quintus. Venezia: apud Sebastianum Coleti. pp. 485–573.
