= Antonio Grimani (patriarch) =

Catholic bishop and patriarch (1557–1628)

- Patriarch of Aquileia
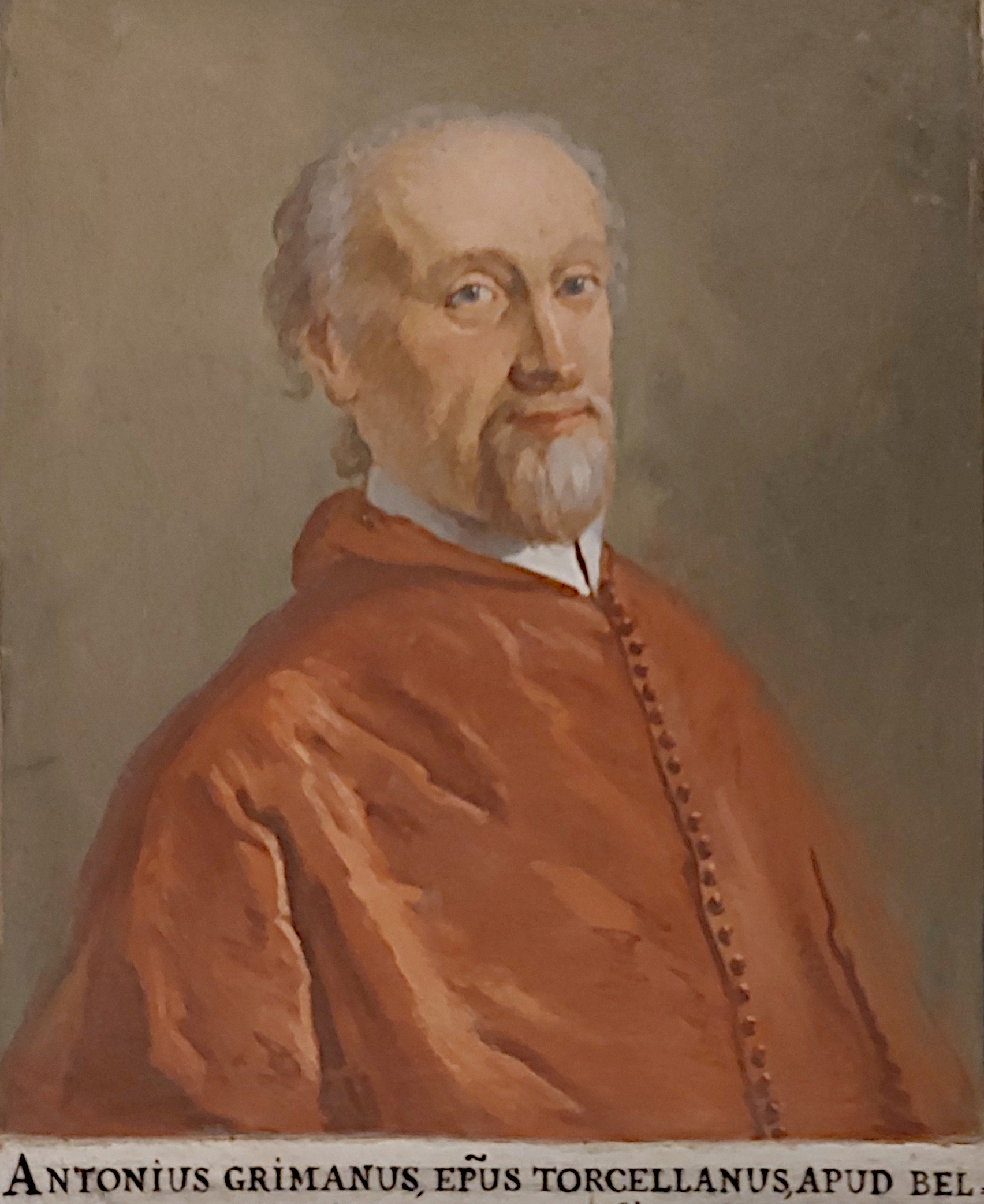
- Church: Catholic Church
- See: Patriarchate of Aquileia
- Appointed: 22 December 1622
- Term ended: 26 January 1628
- Predecessor: Ermolao Barbero
- Successor: Agostino Gradenigo
- Other post: Bishop of Torcello

Orders
- Consecration: 15 November 1587 (Bishop) by Cardinal Giovanni Battista Castrucci

Personal details
- Born: 1557 Venice
- Died: 26 January 1628 (aged 70–71) Venice
- Buried: San Francesco della Vigna

Antonio Grimani (Latin: Antonius Grimanus; 1557 – 26 January 1628) was bishop of Torcello from 1587 to 1622, Apostolic Nuncio to Florence from 1605 to 1616, and Patriarch of Aquileia from 1622 to his death in 1628.

== Life ==
Antonio Grimani was born in Venice in 1557 to the noble Grimani family, nephew of Patriarch Giovanni Grimani.

He was appointed bishop of Torcello on 26 October 1587. He received the episcopal consecration in Rome on 12 April 1610 by the hands of Cardinal Giovanni Battista Castrucci. He was Nuncio of the Republic of Venice in France and in Belgium

From 2 July 1605 to 27 June 1616 he was sent by Pope Paul V to Florence as Nuncio.

On 22 May 1618 he was appointed coadjutor bishop with the right of succession to the Patriarch of Aquileia. Shortly later, in September 1618, he resigned as bishop of Torcello. Antonio Grimani became Patriarch at the death of the previous Patriarch, Ermolao Barbero, on 22 December 1622. He entered in Udine about three years later.

Antonio Grimani died in Venice on 26 January 1628 and was buried in the family chapel in the church of San Francesco della Vigna.
