= Cardinals created by Pius IV =

Catholic appointments from 1560 to 1565

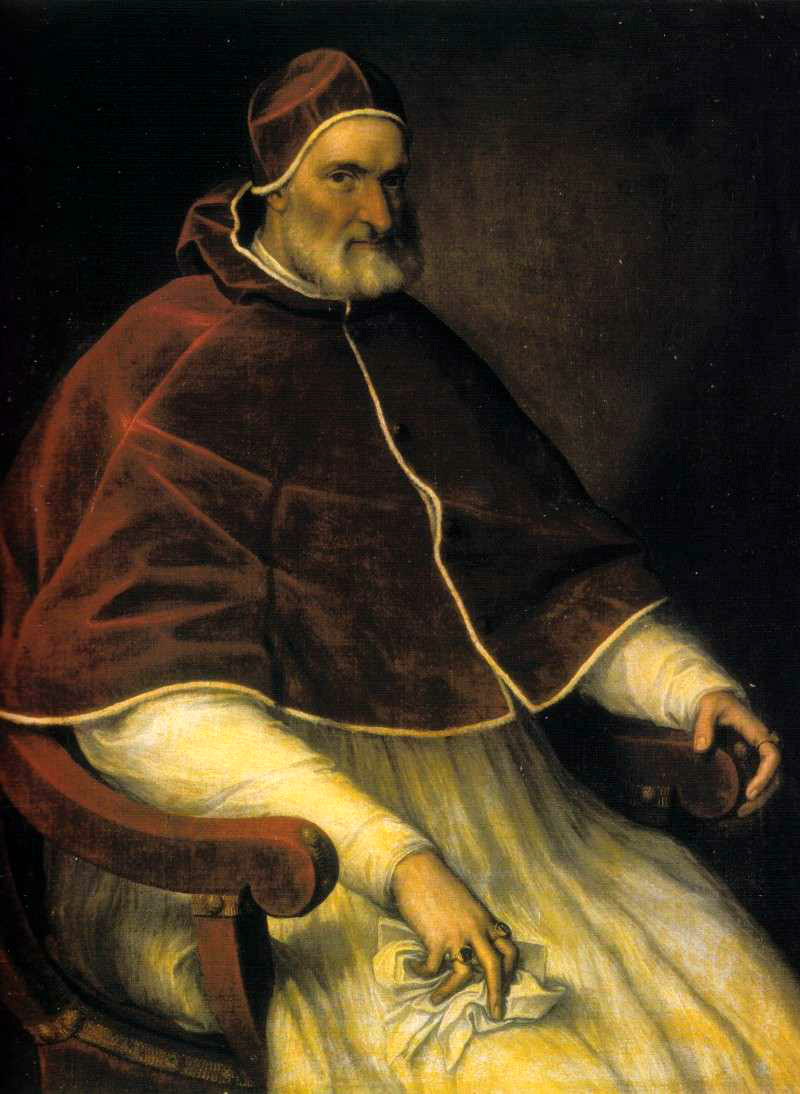
Pope Pius IV (1499–1565).

Pope Pius IV (r. 1559–1565) created 46 cardinals in four consistories:

== 31 January 1560 ==
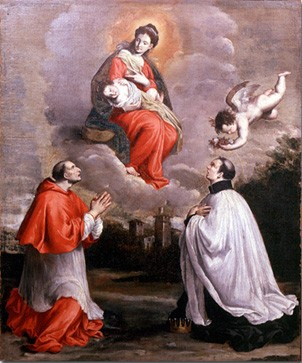
Charles Borromeo (1538–84) (on left), made a cardinal on 31 January 1560.

1. Giovanni Antonio Serbelloni, nephew of the Pope, bishop of Foligno – cardinal-priest of S. Giorgio in Velabro (received the title on 14 February 1560), then cardinal-priest of S. Maria degli Angeli (15 May 1565), cardinal-priest of S. Pietro in Vincoli (12 April 1570), cardinal-priest of S. Clemente (9 June 1570), cardinal-priest of S. Angelo in Pescheria (3 July 1570), cardinal-priest of S. Maria in Trastevere (31 July 1577), cardinal-bishop of Sabina (9 July 1578), cardinal-bishop of Palestrina (5 October 1578), cardinal-bishop of Frascati (4 March 1583), cardinal-bishop of Porto e S. Rufina (11 December 1587), cardinal-bishop of Ostia e Velletri (2 March 1589), † 18 March 1591
2. Charles Borromeo, nephew of the Pope – cardinal-deacon of SS. Vito e Modesto (received the title on 14 February 1560), then cardinal-deacon of SS. Silvestro e Martino (4 September 1560), cardinal-priest of SS. Silvestro e Martino (4 June 1563), cardinal-priest of S. Prassede (17 November 1564), † 3 November 1584
3. Giovanni de' Medici, son of the Duke of Florence – cardinal-deacon of S. Maria in Domnica (received the title on 26 April 1560), † 20 November 1562

== 26 February 1561 ==
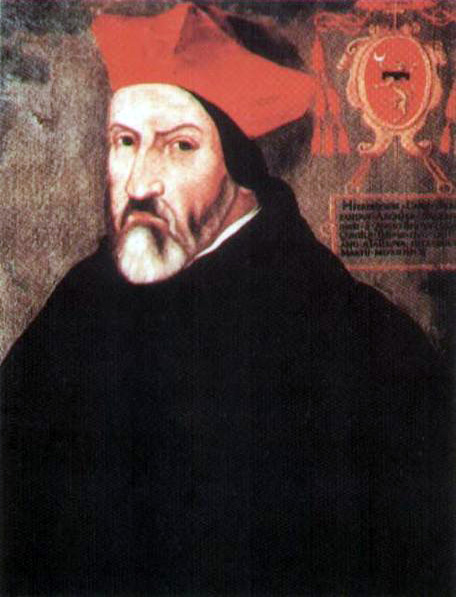
Girolamo Seripando (1493–1563), made a cardinal on February 26, 1561.

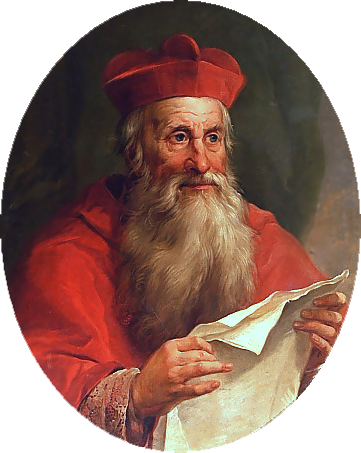
Stanislaus Hosius (1504–79), made a cardinal on February 26, 1561.

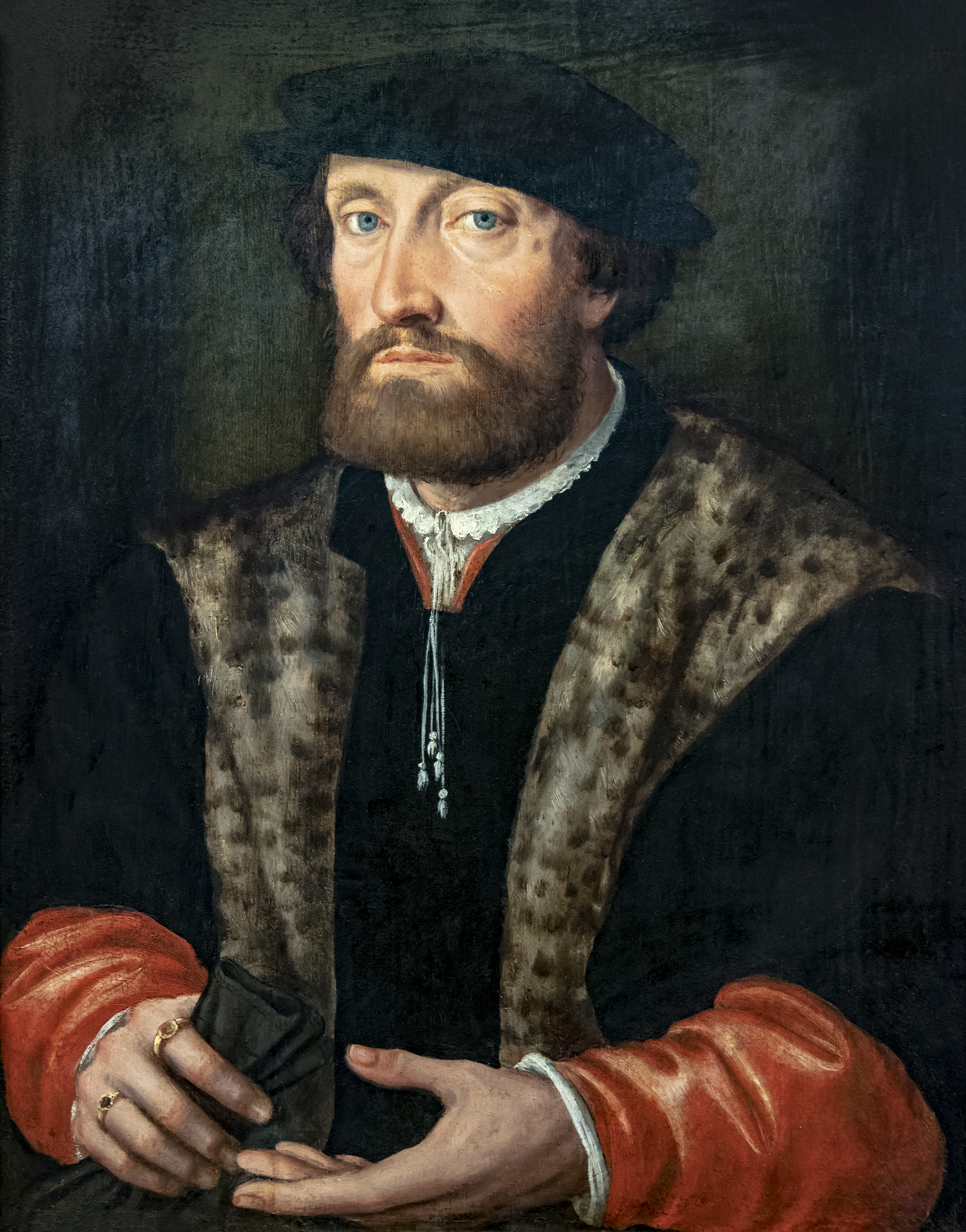
Antoine Perrenot de Granvelle (1517–86), made a cardinal on February 26, 1561.

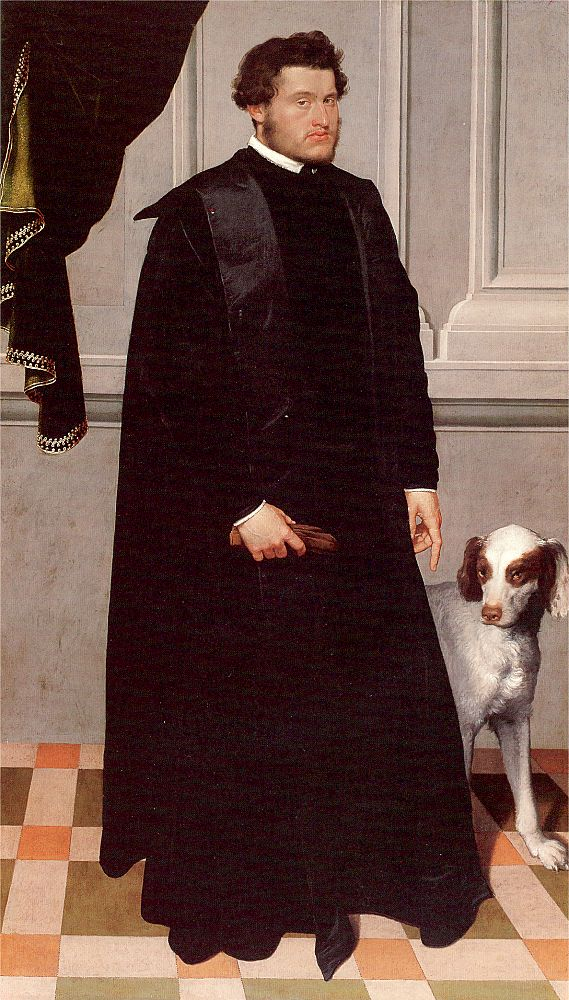
Ludovico Madruzzo (1532–1600), made a cardinal on February 26, 1561.

1. Girolamo Seripando, O.S.A., archbishop of Salerno – cardinal-priest of S. Susanna (received the title on 10 March 1561), † 16 April 1563
2. Philibert Babou de la Bourdaisière, bishop of Angoulême – cardinal-priest of S. Sisto (received the title on 10 March 1561), then cardinal-priest of SS. Silvestro e Martino (17 November 1564), cardinal-priest of S. Anastasia (14 May 1568), † 25 January 1570
3. Ludovico Simonetta, bishop of Pesaro, datary of the Pope – cardinal-priest of S. Ciriaco (received the title on 10 March 1561), then cardinal-priest of S. Anastasia (15 November 1566), † 30 April 1568
4. Mark Sittich von Hohenems Altemps, nephew of the Pope, bishop-elect of Cassano – cardinal-deacon of SS. XII Apostoli (received the title on 10 March 1561), then cardinal-priest of SS. XII Apostoli (30 July 1563), cardinal-priest of S. Giorgio in Velabro (15 May 1565), cardinal-priest of S. Pietro in Vincoli (3 October 1578), cardinal-priest of S. Clemente (17 August 1579), cardinal-priest of S. Maria in Trastevere (5 December 1580), † 15 February 1595
5. Francesco Gonzaga – cardinal-deacon of S. Nicola in Carcere (received the title on 10 March 1561), then cardinal-deacon of S. Lorenzo in Lucina (6 July 1562), cardinal-priest of S. Lorenzo in Lucina (1 March 1564), † 6 January 1566
6. Alfonso Gesualdo – cardinal-deacon of S. Cecilia (received the title on 10 March 1561), then cardinal-priest of S. Cecilia (22 October 1563), cardinal-priest of S. Prisca (17 October 1572), cardinal-priest of S. Anastasia (9 July 1578), cardinal-priest of S. Pietro in Vincoli (17 August 1579), cardinal-priest of S. Clemente (5 December 1580), cardinal-bishop of Albano (4 March 1583), cardinal-bishop of Frascati (11 December 1587), cardinal-bishop of Porto e S. Rufina (2 March 1589), cardinal-bishop of Ostia e Velletri (20 March 1591), † 14 February 1603
7. Gianfrancesco Gambara – cardinal-deacon of SS. Marcellino e Pietro (received the title on 10 March 1561), then cardinal-priest of SS. Marcellino e Pietro (1562?), cardinal-priest of S. Pudenziana (17 November 1565), cardinal-priest of S. Prisca (3 July 1570), cardinal-priest of S. Anastasia (17 October 1572), cardinal-priest of S. Clemente (9 July 1578), cardinal-priest of S. Maria in Trastevere (17 August 1579), cardinal-bishop of Albano (5 December 1580), cardinal-bishop of Palestrina (4 March 1583), † 5 May 1587
8. Marcantonio da Mula, ambassador of the Republic of Venice – cardinal-deacon of S. Marcello (received the title on 10 March 1561), then cardinal-priest of S. Marcello (17 March 1561), † 17 March 1572
9. Bernardo Salviati, O.S.Io.Hieros., bishop of Saint-Papoul, grand prior of Rome – cardinal-priest of S. Simeone Profeta (received the title on 27 June 1561), then cardinal-priest of S. Prisca (15 May 1566), † 6 May 1568
10. Stanislaus Hosius, bishop of Warmia – cardinal-priest of S. Lorenzo in Panisperna (received the title on 8 August 1561), then cardinal-priest of S. Pancrazio (31 August 1562), cardinal-priest of S. Sabina (4 September 1565), cardinal-priest of S. Teodoro (7 September 1565), cardinal-priest of S. Prisca (10 February 1570), cardinal-priest of S. Anastasia (9 June 1570), cardinal-priest of S. Clemente (3 July 1570), cardinal-priest of S. Pietro in Vincoli (9 July 1578), cardinal-priest of S. Maria in Trastevere (3 October 1578), † 5 August 1579
11. Pier Francesco Ferrero, bishop of Vercelli – cardinal-priest of S. Cesareo in Palatio (received the title on 3 June 1561), then cardinal-priest of S. Agnese in Agone (10 November 1561), cardinal-priest of S. Anastasia (7 October 1566), † 14 November 1566
12. Antoine Perrenot de Granvelle, bishop of Arras – cardinal-priest of S. Bartolomeo all'Isola (received the title on 6 July 1562), then cardinal-priest of S. Prisca (14 May 1568), cardinal-priest of S. Anastasia (10 February 1570), cardinal-priest of S. Pietro in Vincoli (9 June 1570), cardinal-priest of S. Maria in Trastevere (9 July 1578), cardinal-bishop of Sabina (3 October 1578), † 21 September 1586
13. Luigi d'Este – cardinal-deacon of SS. Nereo ed Achilleo (received the title on 6 July 1562), then cardinal-deacon of S. Lucia in Silice (22 October 1563), cardinal-deacon of S. Angelo in Pescheria (31 July 1577), cardinal-deacon of S. Maria in Via Lata (19 December 1583), † 30 December 1586
14. Ludovico Madruzzo – cardinal-deacon of S. Callisto (received the title on 3 June 1561), then cardinal-deacon of S. Onofrio (4 May 1562), cardinal-priest of S. Onofrio (9 February 1569), cardinal-priest of S. Anastasia (1 October 1586), cardinal-priest of S. Lorenzo in Lucina (20 March 1591), cardinal-bishop of Sabina (18 August 1597), cardinal-bishop of Frascati (21 February 1600), † 20 April 1600
15. Innico d'Avalos d'Aragona O.S. Iacobis – cardinal-deacon of S. Lucia in Silice (received the title on 3 June 1561), then cardinal-deacon of S. Adriano (30 July 1563), cardinal-priest of S. Adriano (19 January 1565), cardinal-priest of S. Lorenzo in Lucina (3 March 1567), cardinal-bishop of Sabina (13 October 1586), cardinal-bishop of Frascati (2 March 1589), cardinal-bishop of Porto e S. Rufina (20 March 1591), † 20 February 1600
16. Francisco Pacheco de Toledo – cardinal-deacon of S. Susanna (received the title on 14 July 1564), then cardinal-priest of S. Pudenziana (7 February 1565), cardinal-priest of S. Croce in Gerusalemme (17 November 1565), † 23 August 1579
17. Bernardo Navagero – cardinal-deacon without the title, then (2 June 1561) cardinal-priest of S. Nicola inter Imagines (received the title on 3 June 1561), cardinal-priest of S. Pancrazio (6 July 1562), cardinal-priest of S. Nicola inter Imagines (31 August 1562), cardinal-priest of S. Susanna (7 February 1565), † 13 April 1565
18. Girolamo di Corregio – cardinal-deacon without the title, then (2 June 1561) cardinal-priest of S. Giovanni a Porta Latina (received the title on 3 June 1561), cardinal-priest of S. Stefano al Monte Celio (5 May 1562), cardinal-priest of SS. Silvestro e Martino (14 May 1568), cardinal-priest of S. Prisca (9 June 1570), cardinal-priest of S. Anastasia (3 July 1570), † 9 October 1572

Another cardinal was named in pectore. Possible candidates include Daniele Barbaro and Giovanni Grimani. The later, according to some art historians, even had his portrait painted by Tintoretto in the attire of a cardinal as part of campaign to present himself as the in pectore appointment.

== 6 January 1563 ==
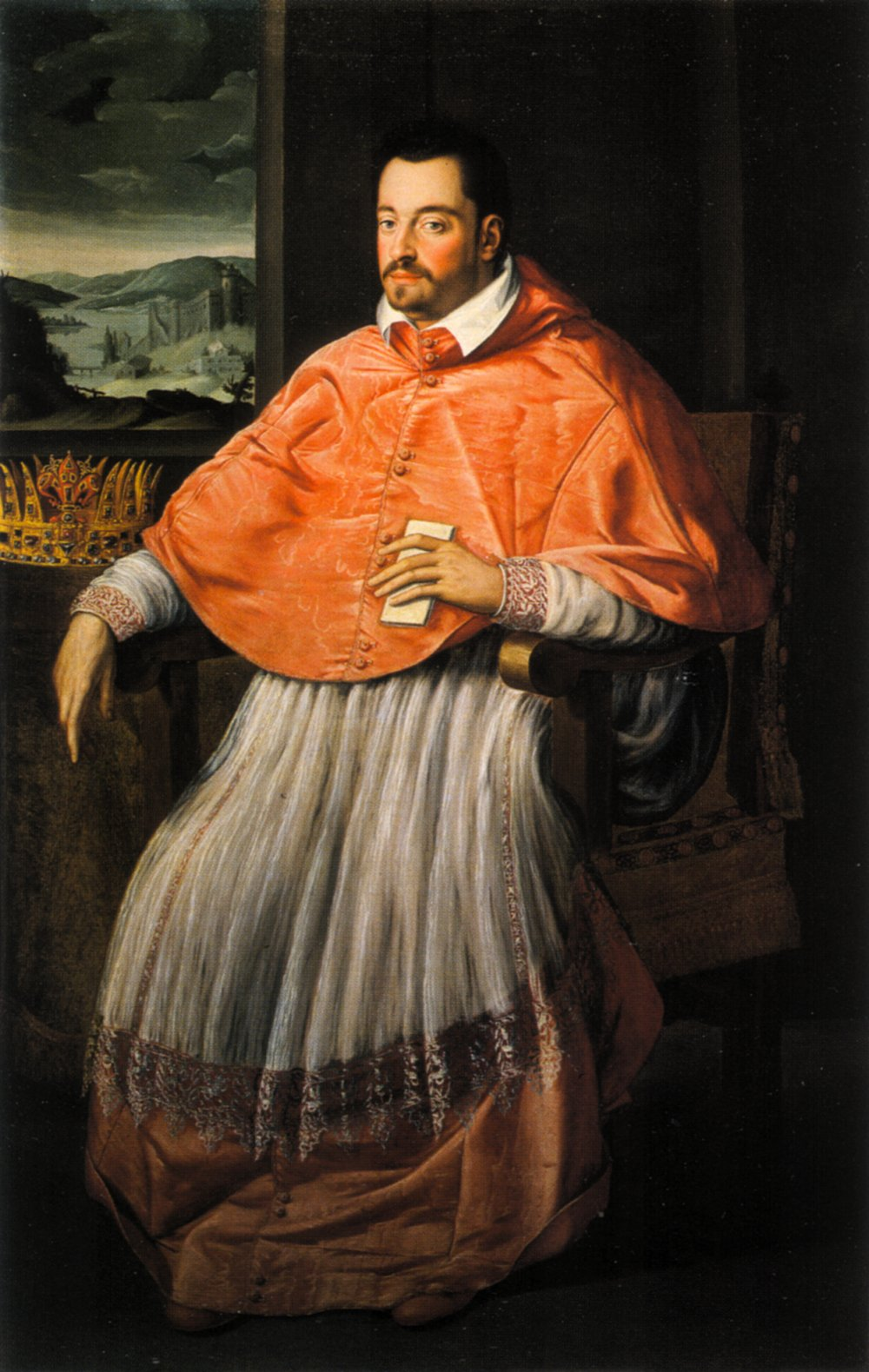
Ferdinando de' Medici (1549–1609), made a cardinal on January 6, 1563.

1. Federico Gonzaga, brother of the Duke of Mantua – cardinal-deacon of S. Maria Nuova (received the title on w marcu 1563), † 21 February 1565
2. Ferdinando de' Medici, son of the Duke of Florence – cardinal-deacon of S. Maria in Domnica (received the title on 10 May 1565), then cardinal-deacon of S. Eustachio (15 May 1585), cardinal-deacon of S. Maria in Via Lata (7 January 1587); resigned the cardinalate on 28 November 1588, † 22 February 1609

== 12 March 1565 ==
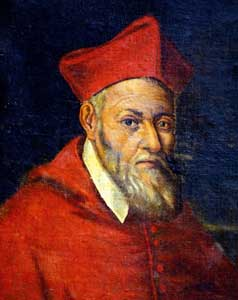
Tolomeo Gallio (1527–1607), made a cardinal on March 12, 1565.

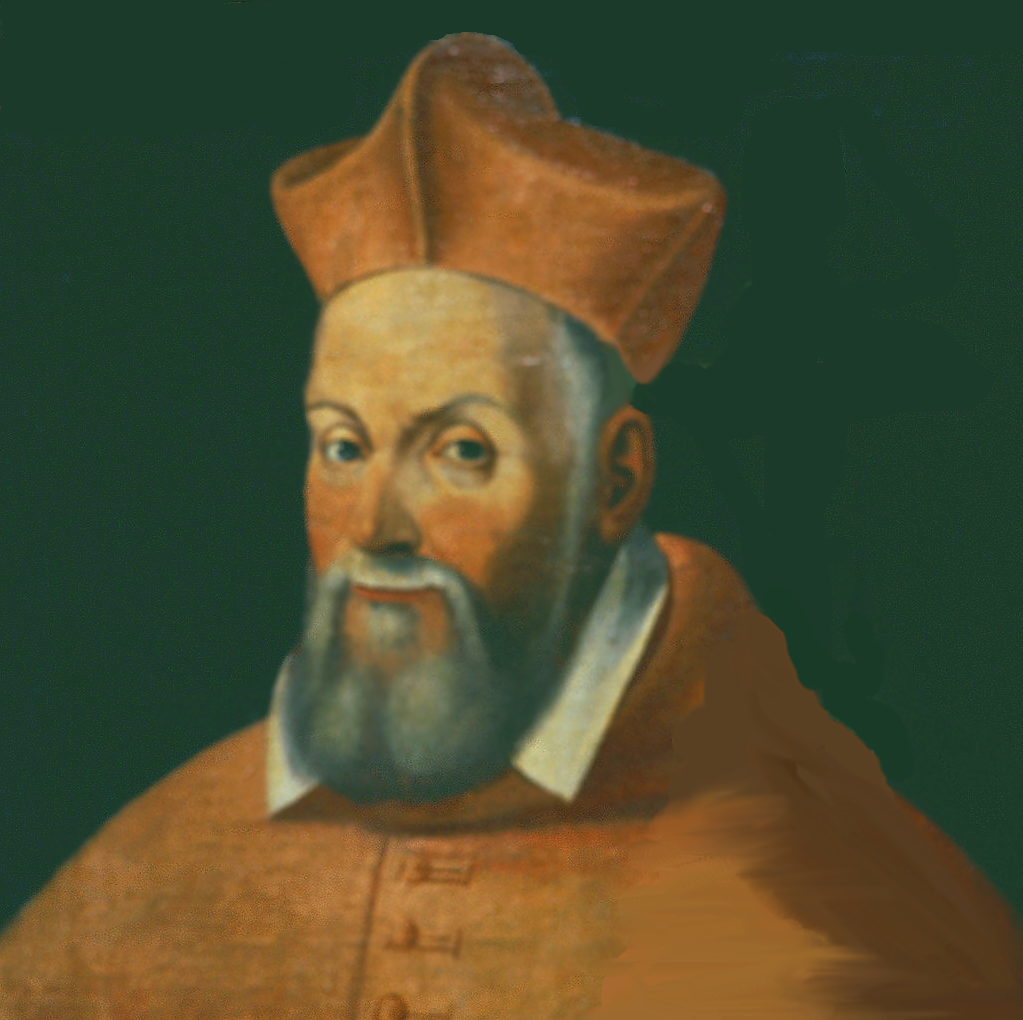
Giovanni Francesco Commendone (1523–84), made a cardinal on March 12, 1565.

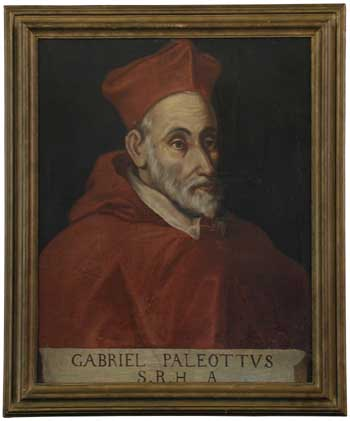
Gabriele Paleotti (1522–97), made a cardinal on March 12, 1565.

1. Annibale Bozzuti, archbishop of Avignon – cardinal-priest of S. Silvestro in Capite (received the title on 15 May 1565), † 6 October 1565
2. Marco Antonio Colonna, archbishop of Taranto – cardinal-priest of SS. XII Apostoli (received the title on 15 May 1565), cardinal-priest of S. Pietro in Vincoli (5 December 1580), cardinal-priest of S. Lorenzo in Lucina (13 October 1586), cardinal-bishop of Palestrina (11 May 1587), † 14 March 1597
3. Tolomeo Gallio, archbishop of Manfredonia – cardinal-priest of S. Teodoro (received the title on 15 May 1565), then cardinal-priest of S. Pancrazio (7 September 1565), cardinal-priest of S. Agata in Suburra (14 May 1568), cardinal-priest of S. Maria del Popolo (20 April 1587), cardinal-bishop of Albano (11 December 1587), cardinal-bishop of Sabina (2 March 1589), cardinal-bishop of Porto e S. Rufina (21 February 1600), cardinal-bishop of Ostia e Velletri (19 February 1603), † 3 February 1607
4. Angelo Nicolini, archbishop of Pisa – cardinal-priest of S. Callisto (received the title on 15 May 1565), † 15 August 1567
5. Luigi Pisani, bishop of Padova – cardinal-priest of S. Vitale (received the title on 8 February 1566), then cardinal-priest of S. Marco (2 June 1568), † 3 June 1570
6. Prospero Santacroce, bishop of Kisamos, nuncio in France – cardinal-priest of S. Girolamo degli Schiavoni (received the title on 8 February 1566), then cardinal-priest of S. Maria degli Angeli (12 April 1570), cardinal-priest of S. Adriano (5 May 1574), cardinal-priest of S. Clemente (4 March 1583), cardinal-bishop of Albano (2 March 1589), † 2 October 1589
7. Zaccaria Delfino, bishop of Hvar, nuncio in Austria – cardinal-priest of S. Maria in Aquiro (received the title on 7 September 1565), then cardinal-priest of S. Stefano al Monte Celio (15 April 1578), cardinal-priest of S. Anastasia (17 August 1579), † 19 December 1583
8. Marcantonio Bobba bishop of Aosta – cardinal-priest of S. Silvestro in Capite (received the title on 8 February 1566), then cardinal-priest of S. Marcello (2 June 1572), † 18 March 1575
9. Ugo Boncompagni, bishop of Viesti, prefect of the Signature of Grace – cardinal-priest of S. Sisto (received the title on 15 May 1565); became Pope Gregory XIII on 13 May 1572, † 10 April 1585
10. Alessandro Sforza, bishop of Parma – cardinal-priest of S. Maria in Via (received the title on 15 May 1565), † 16 May 1581
11. Simone Pasqua, bishop of Luni-Sarzana – cardinal-priest of S. Sabina (received the title on 15 May 1565), then cardinal-priest of S. Pancrazio (4 September 1565), † 4 September 1565
12. Flavio Orsini, bishop of Muro – cardinal-priest of S. Giovanni a Porta Latina (received the title on 15 May 1565), then cardinal-priest of SS. Marcellino e Pietro (17 November 1565), cardinal-priest of S. Prisca (9 July 1578), † 16 May 1581
13. Carlo Visconti, bishop of Ventimiglia – cardinal-priest of SS. Vito e Modesto (received the title on 15 May 1565), † 12 November 1565
14. Francesco Alciati, bishop of Civita Castellana – cardinal-deacon of S. Lucia in Septisolio (received the title on 15 May 1565), then cardinal-deacon of S. Susanna (3 June 1565), cardinal-deacon of S. Maria in Portico (13 May 1569), cardinal-priest of S. Maria in Portico (22 June 1569), † 20 April 1580
15. Francesco Abbondio Castiglioni, bishop of Bobbio – cardinal-deacon without the title, then (1565) cardinal-priest of S. Nicola inter Imagines (received the title on 8 February 1566), † 14 November 1568
16. Guido Luca Ferrero, bishop of Vercelli, nuncio in Venice – cardinal-deacon without the title, then (26 October? 1565) cardinal-priest of S. Eufemia (received the title on 8 February 1566), cardinal-priest of SS. Vito e Modesto (6 March 1566), † 16 May 1585
17. Alessandro Crivelli, bishop of Cerenza e Cariati, nuncio in Spain – cardinal-deacon without the title, then (1565) cardinal-priest of S. Giovanni a Porta Latina (received the title on 8 February 1566), cardinal-priest of S. Maria in Aracoeli (20 November 1570), † 22 December 1574
18. Antoine de Créqui Canaples, bishop of Amiens – cardinal-deacon without the title, then (1565) cardinal-priest of S. Trifonio (received the title on 13 March 1566), † 20 June 1574
19. Giovanni Francesco Commendone, bishop of Zacynthus, nuncio in Poland – cardinal-deacon without the title, then (1565) cardinal-priest of S. Ciriaco (received the title on 15 November 1566), cardinal-priest of S. Maria degli Angeli (5 July 1574), cardinal-priest of S. Anastasia (9 January 1584), cardinal-priest of S. Marco (14 May 1584), † 26 December 1584
20. Benedetto Lomellini – cardinal-deacon of S. Maria in Aquiro (received the title on 15 May 1565), then cardinal-priest of S. Sabina (7 September 1565), † 24 July 1579
21. Gugliemo Sirleto – cardinal-deacon of S. Lorenzo in Panisperna (received the title on 15 May 1565), then cardinal-priest of S. Lorenzo in Panisperna (26 October 1565), † 6 October 1585
22. Gabriele Paleotti – cardinal-deacon of SS. Nereo ed Achilleo (received the title on 15 May 1565), then cardinal-deacon of SS. Giovanni e Paolo (7 September 1565), cardinal-priest of SS. Giovanni e Paolo (30 January 1566), cardinal-priest of SS. Silvestro e Martino (5 July 1572), cardinal-priest of S. Lorenzo in Lucina (11 May 1587), cardinal-bishop of Albano (8 November 1589), cardinal-bishop of Sabina (20 March 1591), † 23 July 1597
23. Francesco Crasso, governor of Bologna – cardinal-deacon without the title, then (26 October 1565) cardinal-priest of S. Lucia in Septisolio (received the title on 8 February 1566), cardinal-priest of S. Eufemia (6 March 1566), † 29 August 1566

== Sources ==
- Miranda, Salvador. "Consistories for the creation of Cardinals, 16th Century (1503-1605): Pius IV (1559-1565)". The Cardinals of the Holy Roman Church. Florida International University. OCLC 53276621.
- Konrad Eubel: "Hierarchia Catholica", Vol. III, Münster 1923
