= Marcantonio Bobba =

- Cardinal-Priest of San Marcello
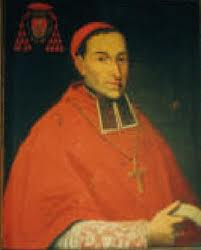
- Church: Catholic Church
- See: San Marcello al Corso
- In office: 2 June 1572 – 18 March 1575
- Predecessor: Marcantonio Amulio
- Successor: Giovanni Battista Castagna
- Previous posts: Cardinal-Priest of San Silvestro in Capite (1566-1572); Bishop of Aosta (1557-1568)

Orders
- Ordination: 1556
- Consecration: 25 August 1557 by Giovanni Angelo Medici
- Created cardinal: 12 March 1565 by Pope Pius IV

Personal details
- Born: 1500 Casale Monferrato, March of Montferrat, Kingdom of Italy, Holy Roman Empire
- Died: 18 March 1575 (aged 74–75) Rome, Papal States

Marcantonio Bobba (also in French Marc-Antoine Bobba) (died 1575) was an Italian Roman Catholic Bishop of Aosta, Italy and cardinal.

== Biography ==
Marcantonio Bobba was born in Casale Monferrato, the son of Palatine Count Alberto Bobba. His family was related to the signori of Rosignano Monferrato.

He was educated at the University of Turin, becoming a doctor of both laws. There, he gained the favor of Emmanuel Philibert, Duke of Savoy, who made him a senator of Turin.

He was ordained as a priest around 1556. On 14 June 1557, he was elected to be Bishop of Aosta. He was consecrated as a bishop in Rome by Cardinal Giovanni Angelo de' Medici. The Duke of Savoy named him ambassador of the Duchy of Savoy to the Holy See in 1559. He arrived at the Council of Trent on 17 January 1563, participating in the council until its close. He was also the Duchy of Savoy's ambassador to the council. From 21 June 1563, he was a member of the council's commission on canons and marriage.

Pope Pius IV made him a cardinal priest in the consistory of 12 March 1565. He participated in the papal conclave of 1565-66 that elected Pope Pius V. He received the red hat and the titular church of San Silvestro in Capite on 8 February 1566. Together with Cardinals Giovanni Ricci, Giovanni Francesco Commendone, and Alessandro Sforza, was named by Pope Pius V inspector of rivers, ports and public roads of Rome. He was a participant in the papal conclave of 1572 that elected Pope Gregory XIII. On 2 June 1572, he opted for the titular church of San Marcello al Corso.

He was a good friend of Cardinal Charles Borromeo.

He died in Rome on 18 March 1575. He was buried in Santa Maria degli Angeli e dei Martiri.

== Episcopal succession ==
Episcopal succession of Marcantonio Bobba

While bishop, he was the principal consecrator of:

- Hildebrand Riedmatten, Bishop of Sion (1569); and
- Carlo Montigli, Archbishop of Amalfi (1570).

== See also ==
- Catholic Church in Italy

== Bibliography ==
- Carlo Tenivelli (1785). Biografia Piemontese (in Italian). Vol. Decade seconda. Torino: Briolo. pp. 235–250.

Catholic Church titles
Preceded by Pietro Gazino	Bishop of Aosta; 1557–1568	Succeeded by Girolamo Ferragatta
Preceded by Annibale Bozzuti	Cardinal-Priest of San Silvestro in Capite; 1566–1572	Succeeded by François de Joyeuse
Preceded by Marco Antonio Amulio	Cardinal-Priest of San Marcello; 1572–1575	Succeeded by Giovanni Battista Castagna
