= Bartolomeo Gradenigo (bishop of Brescia) =

Italian Roman Catholic prelate

Most Reverend Bartolomeo Gradenigo
- Bishop of Brescia
- Church: Catholic Church
- Diocese: Diocese of Brescia
- In office: 1682–1698
- Predecessor: Marino Giovanni Zorzi
- Successor: Daniello Marco Delfino
- Previous posts: Bishop of Concordia (1667–1668); Bishop of Treviso (1668–1682)

Orders
- Ordination: 9 Oct 1667
- Consecration: 20 Nov 1667 by Pietro Vito Ottoboni

Personal details
- Born: Mar 1636 Venice, Italy
- Died: 29 July 1698 (aged 62) Brescia, Italy

Bartolomeo Gradenigo (1636–1698) was a Roman Catholic prelate who served as Bishop of Brescia (1682–1698), Bishop of Treviso (1668–1682), and Bishop of Concordia (1667–1668).

== Biography ==
Bartolomeo Gradenigo was born in Venice, Italy in March 1636 and ordained a priest on 9 Oct 1667. On 14 Nov 1667, he was appointed by Pope Clement IX as Bishop of Concordia. On 20 Nov 1667, he was consecrated bishop by Pietro Vito Ottoboni, Cardinal-Priest of San Marco, with Carlo Stefano Anastasio Ciceri, Bishop of Alessandria della Paglia, and Francesco Grassi, Bishop of Nona, serving as co-consecrators.

On 27 Feb 1668, he was appointed by Pope Clement IX as Bishop of Treviso. On 13 Jul 1682, he was appointed by Pope Innocent XI as Bishop of Brescia.

He served as Bishop of Brescia until his death on 29 Jul 1698.

Catholic Church titles
Preceded by Benedetto Cappello	Bishop of Concordia; 1667–1668	Succeeded by Agostino Premoli
Preceded by Antonio Lupi	Bishop of Treviso; 1668–1682	Succeeded by Giovanni Battista Sanudo
Preceded by Marino Giovanni Zorzi	Bishop of Brescia; 1682–1698	Succeeded by Daniello Marco Delfino
