= Basilica of Sylvester =

The Basilica of Sylvester could refer to:

- San Silvestro in Capite
- San Martino ai Monti, also known as Santi Silvestro e Martino ai Monti - Titolo Equizio
