= Carlo Montigli =

Italian Roman Catholic prelate (died 1594)

Most Reverend Carlo Montigli
- Archbishop (Personal Title) of Viterbo e Tuscania
- Church: Catholic Church
- Diocese: Diocese of Viterbo
- In office: 1576–1594
- Predecessor: Giovanni Francesco Gàmbara
- Successor: Girolamo Matteucci
- Previous posts: Archbishop of Amalfi (1570–1576); Apostolic Nuncio to Florence (1591–1592)

Orders
- Consecration: 13 December 1570 by Marcantonio Bobba

Personal details
- Died: 10 April 1594

Carlo Montigli (died 1594) was a Roman Catholic prelate who served as Archbishop (Personal Title) of Viterbo e Tuscania (1576–1594), Apostolic Nuncio to Florence (1591–1592), and Archbishop of Amalfi (1570–1576).

== Biography ==
On 20 November 1570, Carlo Montigli was appointed during the papacy of Pope Pius V as Archbishop of Amalfi. On 13 December 1570, he was consecrated bishop by Marcantonio Bobba, Cardinal-Priest of San Silvestro in Capite, with Francesco Rusticucci, Bishop of Fano, and Annibal de Ruccellai, Bishop of Carcassonne, serving as co-consecrators. On 28 March 1576, he was appointed during the papacy of Pope Gregory XIII as Archbishop (Personal Title) of Viterbo e Tuscania. On 3 August 1591, he was appointed during the papacy of Pope Gregory XIV as Apostolic Nuncio to Florence. On 27 February 1592, he resigned as Apostolic Nuncio to Florence. He served as Archbishop of Viterbo e Tuscania until his death on 10 April 1594.

== External links and additional sources ==
- Cheney, David M. "Archdiocese of Amalfi-Cava de' Tirreni". Catholic-Hierarchy.org. (for Chronology of Bishops) ^{[self-published]}
- Chow, Gabriel. "Archdiocese of Amalfi-Cava de' Tirreni (Italy)". GCatholic.org. (for Chronology of Bishops) ^{[self-published]}
- Cheney, David M. "Nunciature to Florence (Tuscany)". Catholic-Hierarchy.org. (for Chronology of Bishops) ^{[self-published]}

Catholic Church titles
Preceded by Marco Antonio Bozzuto	Archbishop of Amalfi; 1570–1576	Succeeded by Giulio Rossino
Preceded by Michele Priuli	Apostolic Nuncio to Florence; 1591–1592	Succeeded by Marino Zorzi (bishop of Brescia)
Preceded by Giovanni Francesco Gàmbara	Archbishop (Personal Title) of Viterbo e Tuscania; 1576–1594	Succeeded by Girolamo Matteucci
