= Giovanni Alberto Badoer =

Venetian Catholic cardinal

His Eminence Giovanni Alberto Badoer
- Cardinal, Bishop of Brescia
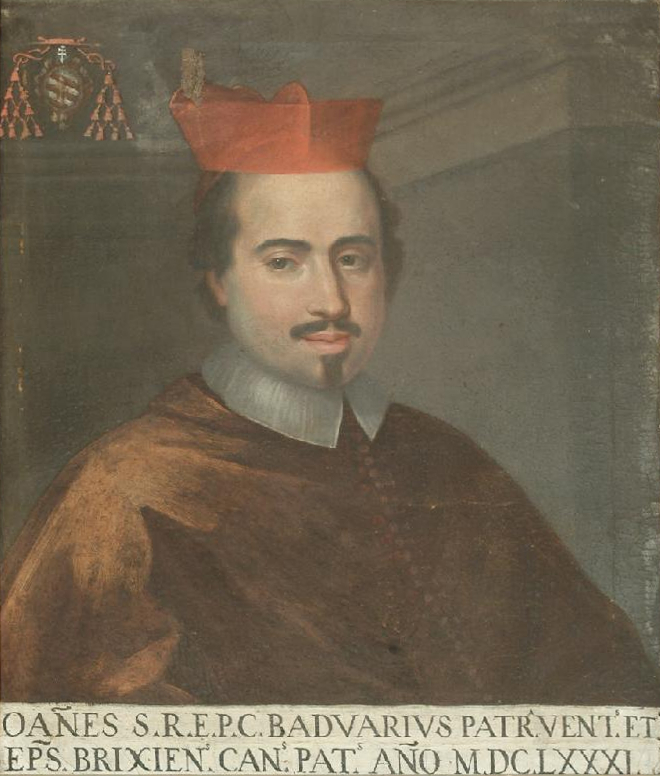
- Church: Roman Catholic
- See: Brescia
- Appointed: 7 June 1706
- Term ended: 17 May 1714
- Predecessor: Daniello Marco Delfino
- Successor: Giovanni Francesco Barbarigo
- Other post: Cardinal-Priest of San Marco (1712–14)
- Previous posts: Cardinal-Priest of San Marcello (1706–12); Patriarch of Venice (1688–1706)

Orders
- Consecration: 14 November 1688 (Bishop) by Gregorio Barbarigo
- Created cardinal: 17 May 1706 by Pope Clement XI
- Rank: Cardinal-Priest

Personal details
- Born: 12 May 1649 Venice, Republic of Venice
- Died: 17 May 1714 (aged 65) Brescia, Republic of Venice
- Buried: New Cathedral, Brescia

Giovanni Alberto Badoer or Gianalberto Badoaro (12 May 1649 – 17 May 1714) was a Venetian Catholic cardinal who served as Patriarch of Venice and Bishop of Brescia.

== Life ==
Giovanni Alberto Badoer was born in Venice on 12 May 1649 of a family of the patrician nobility. He was a nephew of Alberto Badoer, bishop of Crema, who was his teacher from the age of five. It was always the bishop of Crema who started his ecclesiastical career, personally providing him with tonsure, as well as ordering a subdeacon in 1663.

In 1673, together with his uncle bishop, he accompanied the new Cardinal Pietro Basadonna to Rome for his investiture cardinal. Returning to Crema, he was appointed archdeacon of the cathedral and abbot commendatore of San Pietro di colle. After the death of his uncle (1677), he moved to Padua where he met the bishop of that town, Saint Gregorio Barbarigo who deeply influenced his Christian life. Badoer was ordained priest by that bishop in 1677. He earned the doctorate in utroque iure from the University of Padua and he was named a Canon of Cathedral of Padua in 1681.

In 1684, the Doge of Venice appointed him as Primicerius of St Mark's Basilica in Venice. On 27 Sept 1688, the Venetian Senate elected him as Patriarch of Venice. The episcopal consecration followed on 14 November in the Venetian Church of San Lorenzo by the hands of Gregorio Barbarigo who came specifically to Venice for that ceremony. During his years as a patriarch, he assiduously visited the churches, monasteries and seminaries of his diocese, working for the formation of the clergy. Badoer founded the Conservatory of Santa Maria delle Penitenti reserved for women who had abandoned prostitution.

On 7 June 1706, Badoer was transferred by Pope Clement XI to the Diocese of Brescia, because that diocese was subject to some heretic influences coming from North Europe. In the meantime, on 17 May 1706, he was appointed Cardinal priest with the title of San Marcello, which in 1712, he modified to the title of San Marco.

He was particularly noted for his opposition to Quietism and had positions near to the ones of the Jesuites. In particular, Badoer opposed in Brescia the priest Giuseppe Beccarelli charging him of Quietism and having him condemned by the Ecclesiastic Tribunal to seven years for heresy. When the Council of Ten reviewed that process, the punishment was increased to life imprisonment because the Beccarrelli was found guilt also of child sexual abuse.

Badoer died in Brescia on 17 May 1714 and he was buried in the New Cathedral of that town.
