= Vincenzo Giustiniani (bishop of Brescia) =

Roman Catholic prelate

Most Reverend Vincenzo Giustiniani
- Bishop of Brescia
- Church: Catholic Church
- Diocese: Diocese of Brescia
- In office: 1633–1645
- Predecessor: Marino Zorzi
- Successor: Marco Morosini
- Previous post: Bishop of Treviso (1623-1633)

Orders
- Consecration: 7 Jan 1624 by Pietro Valier

Personal details
- Born: 1590 Venice, Republic of Venice
- Died: 13 Feb 1645 (age 55) Brescia, Republic of Venice

Vincenzo Giustiniani (1590 – 13 February 1645) was an Italian Roman Catholic prelate who served as Bishop of Brescia (1633–1645) and Bishop of Treviso (1623–1633).

== Biography ==
Vincenzo Giustiniani was born in Venice, Republic of Venice in 1590. On 18 December 1623, he was appointed during the papacy of Pope Urban VIII as Bishop of Treviso. On 7 January 1624, he was consecrated bishop by Pietro Valier, Bishop of Ceneda, with Agostino Gradenigo, Bishop of Feltre, and Pasquale Grassi, Bishop of Chioggia, serving as co-consecrators. On 31 January 1633, he was appointed during the papacy of Pope Urban VIII as Bishop of Brescia. He served as Bishop of Brescia until his death on 13 February 1645.

While bishop, he was the principal co-consecrator of Innocentius Serpa, Bishop of Pula (1624).

== External links and additional sources ==
- Cheney, David M. "Diocese of Treviso". Catholic-Hierarchy.org. (for Chronology of Bishops) ^{[self-published]}
- Chow, Gabriel. "Diocese of Treviso (Italy)". GCatholic.org. (for Chronology of Bishops) ^{[self-published]}
- Cheney, David M. "Diocese of Brescia". Catholic-Hierarchy.org. (for Chronology of Bishops) ^{[self-published]}
- Chow, Gabriel. "Diocese of Brescia (Italy)". GCatholic.org. (for Chronology of Bishops) ^{[self-published]}

Catholic Church titles
Preceded by Francesco Giustiniani	Bishop of Treviso; 1623–1633	Succeeded by Silvestro Morosini
Preceded by Marino Zorzi	Bishop of Brescia; 1633–1645	Succeeded by Marco Morosini
