= Francesco Cornaro (1478–1543) =

Italian cardinal

- Cardinal
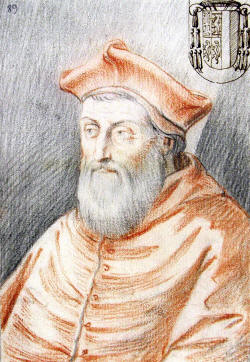
- Church: Roman Catholic
- Appointed: 1530
- In office: 1530 – 1543
- Predecessor: Franciotto Orsini
- Successor: Alessandro Farnese
- Other posts: Administrator of Brescia (1531 – 1532); Cardinal-Priest of Santa Cecilia (1534–1534); Cardinal-Priest of San Ciriaco alle Terme Diocleziane (1534–1535); Cardinal-Priest of Santa Prassede (1535–1541); Cardinal-Priest of Santa Maria in Trastevere (1541–1541); Cardinal-Bishop of Albano (1541–1542); Cardinal Bishop of Palestrina (1542–1543)
- Previous post: Cardinal-Priest of San Pancrazio (1528–1534)
- Created cardinal: by Pope Clement VII

Personal details
- Born: c. 1478 Venice
- Died: 1543 (aged 64–65) Viterbo

Francesco Cornaro (1478 – 26 September 1543) was an Italian cardinal.

He was born in Venice. He was made cardinal on 20 December 1527 by Pope Clement VII in his fourth consistorium. He was installed as Cardinal Priest of San Pancrazio on 27 April 1528.

He was appointed Apostolic Administrator (and possibly later bishop) of Brescia in March 1531; he resigned his office in Brescia in March 1532.

In April 1534 he was appointed Cardinal Priest of Santa Cecilia in Trastevere, in September 1534, Cardinal Priest of San Ciriaco alle Terme Diocleziane and in May 1535 Cardinal Priest of Santa Prassede. In March 1541 he was appointed Cardinal Priest of Santa Maria in Trastevere. Later in 1541, in November, he was appointed Cardinal Bishop of Albano, and in February 1543 Cardinal Bishop of Palestrina.

Cardinal Cornaro died in Viterbo.
