= Vigilio Mario Olmi =

Italian Catholic bishop (1927–2019)

Vigilio Mario Olmi (14 August 1927 – 25 January 2019) was an Italian Catholic bishop.

== Early life ==
Olmi was born in Italy and was ordained to the priesthood in 1950. He served as titular bishop of Gunugus and as auxiliary bishop of the Diocese of Brescia, Italy, from 1986 to 2003.
