= Ursicinus of Brescia =

Italian saint and bishop

Saint Ursicinus of Brescia
- Died: 347
- Venerated in: Eastern Orthodox Church; Roman Catholic Church
- Feast: 1 December

Ursicinus of Brescia was an Italian saint, and bishop of Brescia in Lombardy. He participated in the council of Sardica in 347, in which year he died; his shrine may still be seen. His feast day is 1 December.

== Sources ==
- Entry at Patron Saints Index
