= Marino Zorzi (bishop of Brescia) =

Roman Catholic prelate

Most Reverend Marino Zorzi
- Bishop of Brescia
- Church: Catholic Church
- Diocese: Diocese of Brescia
- In office: 1596–1631
- Predecessor: Gianfrancesco Morosini
- Successor: Vincenzo Giustiniani

Personal details
- Died: 28 August 1631 Brescia, Italy

Marino Zorzi or Marino Giorgi (died 1631) was a Roman Catholic prelate who served as Bishop of Brescia (1596–1631) and Apostolic Nuncio to Florence (1592–1596).

== Biography ==
On 27 February 1592, Marino Zorzi was appointed during the papacy of Pope Clement VIII as Apostolic Nuncio to Florence. On 4 March 1596, he was appointed during the papacy of Pope Clement VIII as Bishop of Brescia. On 26 October 1596, he resigned as Apostolic Nuncio to Florence. He served as Bishop of Brescia until his death on 28 August 1631.

== See also ==
- Catholic Church in Italy

== External links and additional sources ==
- Cheney, David M. "Nunciature to Florence (Tuscany)". Catholic-Hierarchy.org. (for Chronology of Bishops) ^{[self-published]}
- Cheney, David M. "Diocese of Brescia". Catholic-Hierarchy.org. (for Chronology of Bishops) ^{[self-published]}
- Chow, Gabriel. "Diocese of Brescia (Italy)". GCatholic.org. (for Chronology of Bishops) ^{[self-published]}

Catholic Church titles
Preceded by Carlo Montigli	Apostolic Nuncio to Florence; 1592–1596	Succeeded by Offredo de Offredi
Preceded by Gianfrancesco Morosini	Bishop of Brescia; 1596–1631	Succeeded by Vincenzo Giustiniani
