= Terenzio Terenzi =

Italian painter (1575–1621)

Terenzio Terenzi (1575–1621) was an Italian painter of the late-Renaissance or Mannerist period. Born near Pesaro, he is also known as Terenzio da Urbino or il Rondolino. He was a pupil of the painter Federigo Barocci. There is an altarpiece by Terenzi in the Cathedral of Sant'Andrea, a Baptism of Constantine in the quadreria di San Costanzo, and an Assumption of the Virgin (1621) in the church of the Cappuccini in Rome. According to Baglione, Terenzi visited Rome, where he was favored with the protection of Cardinal Montalto, nephew of Pope Sixtus V. Having practiced a deceptions on his benefactor by imposing on him a picture he himself painted for a work of Raphael, he was disgraced. There is a picture of his own composition in the church of San Silvestro, in Rome, representing the Virgin and Infant Christ, with several Saints.
