= Diocese of Brescia =

Roman Catholic diocese in Italy

Diocese of Brescia Dioecesis Brixiensis

Catholic
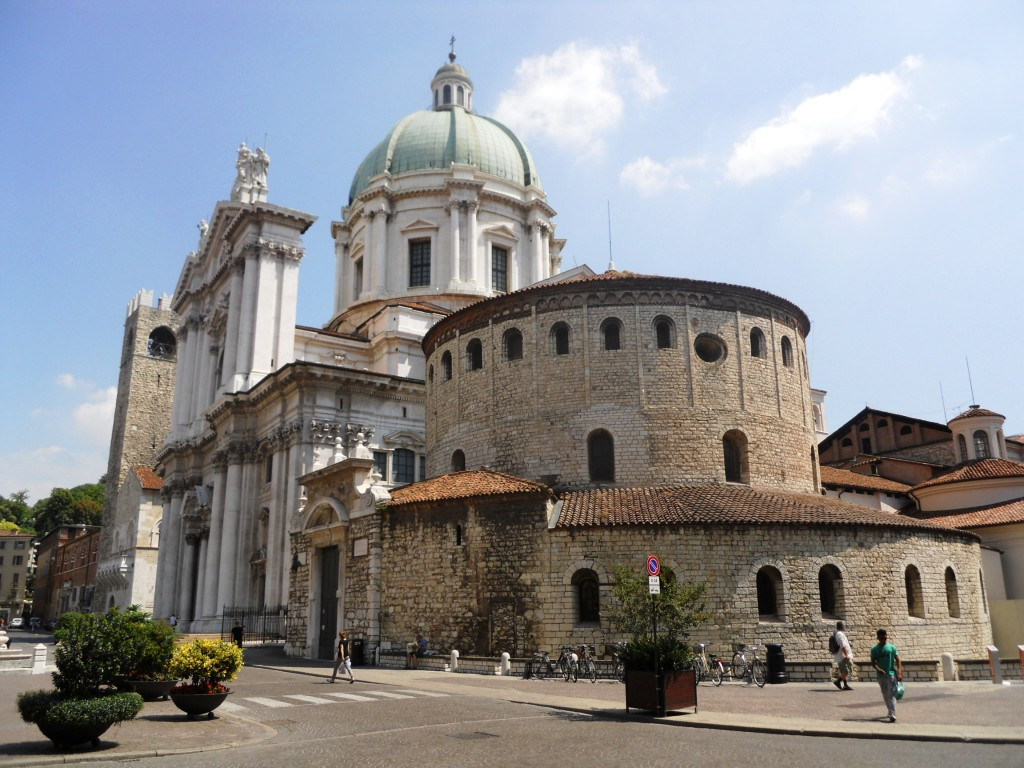
- Brescia Cathedral

Location
- Country: Italy
- Ecclesiastical province: Milan

Statistics
- Area: 4,538 km^{2} (1,752 sq mi)
- Population: Total; Catholics: (as of 2015); 1,152,107; 960,000 (est.) (83.3%)
- Parishes: 473

Information
- Denomination: Catholic
- Sui iuris church: Latin Church
- Rite: Roman Rite
- Established: 1st Century
- Cathedral: Cattedrale di S. Maria Assunta e Ss. Pietro e Paolo (Duomo Nuovo)
- Secular priests: 735 (diocesan); 199 (Religious Orders)

Current leadership
- Pope: Leo XIV
- Bishop: Pierantonio Tremolada
- Bishops emeritus: Luciano Monari

Map

Website
- diocesi.brescia.it

The Diocese of Brescia (Latin: Dioecesis Brixiensis) is a Latin diocese of the Catholic Church in the ecclesiastical province of the Metropolitan Archdiocese of Milan, in Lombardy (Northwestern Italy).

Its cathedral episcopal see is the 'new' Cattedrale di S. Maria Assunta e Ss. Pietro e Paolo (Duomo Nuovo) dedicated to the Assumption of Mary and to the Apostles Peter and Paolo, in Brescia. The city also has a Co-cathedral: Concattedrale invernale di Santa Maria Assunta, also dedicated to the Assumption of Mary, a Minor basilica: Basilica-Santuario di S. Maria delle Grazie dedicated to Our Lady of Graces, and another World Heritage Site (now not in use): Chiesa di San Salvatore.
The diocese has four more Minor basilicas: Basilica di S. Lorenzo Martire, in Verolanuova; Basilica di S. Maria della Visitazione, in Bagnolo Mella; Basilica di Santa Maria Assunta, in Botticino Sera and Basilica Sant’Antonino Martire, in Concesio.

== Statistics and extent ==
In 2015, the diocese was reported as pastorally serving approximately 960,000 Catholics. It has 473 parishes, 990 priests (791 diocesan, 199 religious), 56 deacons, 1,660 lay religious (286 brothers, 1,374 sisters), 36 seminarians.

The great majority of the parishes of the diocese are in the administrative Province of Brescia; the remaining twelve are in the Province of Bergamo and in Lombardy.

== History ==
Legend traces the beginnings of Christianity in Brescia to Saint Barnabas, who is said to have made Saint Anathalon bishop. However, Milan also claims Anatolus as its first bishop, consecrated by Saint Barnabas. In any case, faith was probably brought to Brescia by way of Milan. During the reign of Emperor Hadrian, Brescia was the scene of the martyrdom of Saints Faustinus and Jovita (cfr. Acta Sanctorum, 15 February). From the time of the persecutions tradition mentions the names of several bishops, but nothing authentic is known concerning them. In the fourth century Saint Philastrius occurs. He was succeeded by Saint Gaudentius, consecrated by Saint Ambrose (c. 387), who erected outside the city walls the church Ad Concilia Sanctorum, in which the holy matron Silvia was buried later.

A number of the bishops who ruled this diocese form the 4th to the 7th centuries are entitled saints, e.g. Paul of Brescia, Theophilus of Brescia, Saint Silvinus, Saint Gaudiosus, Saint Optatianus, Saint Dominator (495), and Saint Dominic of Brescia (613), who with the many gifts he received from the Lombard Queen Theodolinda, erected the church called the Rotonda. Bishop Ramperto brought to Brescia the Benedictines, who constructed a church to which they transferred the relics of Saints Faustinus and Jovita; he also took part in the Council of Mantua of 827.

Bishop Notingus received the title of Count of Brescia for the see from Emperor Louis II in 844, so he and his successors became prince-bishops, civil rulers of the city and the countship. Many struggles followed, in particular after Margrave Arduin of Ivrea, who had proclaimed himself King of Italy (1002), had slain the bishop of this city of holding allegiance to Holy Roman Emperor Henry II. Henry, to ensure the fidelity of the citizens of Brescia, was obliged to confirm the civil liberty granted them by Arduin, which is the origin of the civic commune of Brescia. Bishop Landolfo II (1007) built the church of Santa Eufemia outside the walls.

During the episcopate of Manfredo Lucciaga (1133), Arnold of Brescia disseminated his teachings, with the result that the governors of the city all but confiscated the property of the churches of Brescia. Albert of Rezzato (1213) had the Paterines to contend against; he also brought many relics from the Holy Land. Blessed Gualla Ronio (1229), of the Friars Preachers, was distinguished for his virtue. Berardo Maggi (1275), a Guelph (papal supporter in the Investiture Conflict), was made Duke and Count of the city, and constructed among other works two canals diverting the waters of the Rivers Chiese and Mella, in order to furnish the motive force for many factories. Tommaso Visconti (1388) did much for the maintenance of discipline among the clergy. Under Bishop Francesco de' Mareri (1418), the preaching of St. Bernardine of Siena wrought a great moral reform in the city of Brescia. Pietro dal Monte (1442) adorned the episcopal palace, erected a hospital and wrote various works. Paolo Zane (1481) built the shrine of Santa Maria delle Grazie and established the hospital for incurables.

In the sixteenth century three cardinals succeeded each other: Francesco Cornaro (1532), Andrea Cornaro (1543) and Durante de' Duranti (1551). In conformity with the decrees of the Council of Trent, Domenico Bollani (1559) convened a diocesan synod (1574) and founded the seminary. Giovanni Dolfin (1579) seconded St. Charles Borromeo in his work of reform, who by his own desire celebrated the obsequies of Bishop Dolfin. Bishop Pietro Vito Ottoboni (1654) was later elevated to the papacy under the name of Alexander VIII. Cardinal Giovanni Alberto Badoer (1706) was a very zealous pastor, combating in an especial manner the Quietism which occurred his diocese. Cardinal Angelo M. Quirini (1727) founded the library of the commune, which took its name from him, and did much towards the restoration of the cathedral. During the episcopate of Giovanni Nani (1773) the French invasion took place, with the attendant pillaging of churches and convents.

- On 1818.09.12 it gained territory from the suppressed Abbacy nullius of Asola
- It enjoyed Papal visits from Pope John Paul II (in February 1982 and September 1998) and Pope Benedict XVI in November 2009.

== Bishops of Brescia ==
...

- Ursicinus of Brescia (347)
- Philastrius (death ca. 397)
- Paterius (death 606)
- Adeodato (672 - 681 circa)

...

- Goffredo di Canossa (970? – 976)
- Attone (976 – ?)
- Adalberto (996 – 1006)
- Landolfo (1007 – 1030)
- Olderico (1031 – 1048)
- Adelmanno di Liegi (1048 – 1053)
- Olderico (1053 – 1073)
- Giovanni (1080 – ?)
- Arimanno da Gavardo (1086 – 1115)
- Villano (1116 – 1132)
- Manfredo Boccacci (1132 – death 7 Jan 1153)
- Raimondo (1153 – death 4 Aug 1173)
- Joannes (John) Fiumicelli = Giovanni Griffi (1174?75 – 10 Nov 1195)
- Giovanni da Palazzo (18 Nov 1195 – 5 Aug 1212)
- Alberto da Reggio (1213 – 1229), next Latin Patriarch of Antioch (1229 – ?)
- Blessed Guala de Roniis, Dominican Order (O.P.) (1229 – 5 Sep 1244)
- Azzone da Torbiato (1244 – death 18 Oct 1253)
- Cavalcano Sala (1254 – 1263)
- Martino Arimanni (15 Mar 1264 – death 1275)
- Berardo Maggi (Sep 1275 – 1308)
- Federico Maggi (2 January 1309 – ca. 1317)

...

- Domenico de Dominicis (14 Nov 1464 – 1478 Died)
- Lorenzo Zanni (Zane) (27 Feb 1478 – 1480 Resigned)
- Paolo Zane (19 Dec 1480 – Mar 1531 Died)
- Cardinal Francesco Cornaro (seniore), Administrator (Mar 1531 – 13 March 1532 Resigned)
- Andrea Cornaro (13 March 1532 – 30 Jan 1551), succeeded as previous Coadjutor Bishop: Francesco Cornaro (? – 13 Mar 1532)
- Durante Duranti (18 Feb 1551 – 24 Dec 1557)
- Giovanni Delfino (bishop of Brescia) (26 Aug 1579 – 1 May 1584)
- Gianfrancesco Morosini (23 Sep 1585 – 10 Jan 1596 Died)
- Marino Zorzi (bishop of Brescia) (Giorgi) (4 Mar 1596 – 28 Aug 1631)
- Vincenzo Giustiniani (bishop of Brescia) (31 Jan 1633 – 13 Feb 1645 Died)
- Marco Morosini (31 Jul 1645 – 4 Oct 1654 Died)
- Pietro Vito Ottoboni (7 Dec 1654 – 9 Jun 1664 Resigned)
- Marino Giovanni Zorzi (bishop of Brescia) (Giorgi) (9 Jun 1664 – 24 Oct 1678 Died)
- Bartolomeo Gradenigo (bishop of Brescia) (13 Jul 1682 – 29 Jul 1698 Died)
- Daniello Marco Delfino (15 Sep 1698 – 5 Aug 1704 Died)
- Cardinal Giovanni Alberto Badoer (Badoaro) (7 Jun 1706 – 17 May 1714 Died)
  - Auxiliary Bishop: Francesco Martinengo (19 Oct 1711 – death 25 Mar 1746), Titular Bishop of Martiria (19 Oct 1711 – 25 Mar 1746)
- Giovanni Francesco Barbarigo (9 July 1714 – 20 Jan 1723), next Bishop of Padua
- Fortunato Morosini, O.S.B. (15 March 1723 – 25 June 1727 Died)
- Angelo Maria (Gerolamo) Quirini (Querini), O.S.B. (30 Jul 1727 – 6 Jan 1755 Died)
- Giovanni Molino (17 Feb 1755 – 14 Mar 1773 Died)
- Giovanni Nani (19 Apr 1773 – 23 Oct 1804 Died)
- Gabrio Maria Nava (18 Sep 1807 – 2 Nov 1831 Died)
- Carlo Domenico Ferrari (20 Jan 1834 Confirmed – 29 Nov 1846 Died)
- Girolamo dei Conti Verzeri (30 Sep 1850 Confirmed – 1 Dec 1883 Died)
- Giacomo Corna-Pellegrini (1 Dec 1883 Succeeded – 21 May 1913 Died), succeeded as previous Coadjutor Bishop: Giacomo Corna-Pellegrini (31 Mar 1875 – 1 Dec 1883)
- Giacinto Gaggia (28 Oct 1913 – 15 Apr 1933 Died)
  - Auxiliary Bishop: Emilio Bongiorni (31 Jan 1916 – death 20 Mar 1937), Titular Bishop of Sasima (31 Jan 1916 – 20 Mar 1937)
- Giacinto Tredici, Obl. Ss. A. C. (21 Dec 1933 – 19 August 1964 Died)
  - Auxiliary Bishop: Guglielmo Bosetti (4 Nov 1951 – 29 Mar 1961), Titular Bishop of Hippo Diarrhytus (4 Nov 1951 – 29 Mar 1961); later Bishop of Fidenza (Italy) (29 Mar 1961 – death 1 Aug 1962)
  - Auxiliary Bishop: Giuseppe Almici (24 Apr 1961 – 17 Jan 1965), Titular Bishop of Arcadia (24 Apr 1961 – 17 Jan 1965); later Bishop of Alessandria (Italy) (17 Jan 1965 – retired 17 Jul 1980), died 1985
- Luigi Morstabilini (7 Oct 1964 – 7 April 1983 Retired)
  - Auxiliary Bishop: Pietro Gazzoli (3 Feb 1968 – retired 6 Aug 1983), Titular Bishop of Foro Flaminio (3 Feb 1968 – death 17 Feb 1990)
- Bruno Foresti (7 April 1983 – 19 Dec 1998 Retired)
  - Auxiliary Bishop: Vigilio Mario Olmi (20 Mar 1986 – retired 25 Mar 2003), Titular Bishop of Gunugus (20 Mar 1986 – death 25 Jan 2019)
- Giulio Sanguineti (19 Dec 1998 – 19 July 2007 Retired)
  - Auxiliary Bishop: Francesco Beschi (25 Mar 2003 – 22 Jan 2009), Titular Bishop of Vinda (25 Mar 2003 – 22 Jan 2009); later Bishop of Bergamo (Italy) (22 Jan 2009 – ...)
- Luciano Monari (19 July 2007 – 12 July 2017)
- Pierantonio Tremolada (12 July 2017 – ...); previously Titular Bishop of Maxita (24 May 2014 – 12 Jul 2017) as Auxiliary Bishop of Archdiocese of Milano (Milan, Italy) (24 May 2014 – 12 Jul 2017).

== See also ==
- Timeline of Brescia

== Sources and external links ==
- GCatholic
- Diocesi di Brescia, Official website (in Italian) Retrieved: 2016-10-31.

=== Books ===
- Barchi, Alemano (1832). Annotazioni alla Cronologia Bresciana civile e ecclesiastica: dall'origine di Brescia fino ai nostri giorni (in Italian). Brescia: Bettoni.
- Caponi, Anna Maria (1985). Nota sui vescovi bresciani dalle origini al 1075: serie e osservazioni, in: Brixia Sacra 1985, nn. 5–6, pp. 163–179. (in Italian)
- Cappelletti, Giuseppe (1856). Le Chiese d'Italia dalla loro origine sino ai nostri giorni, vol. XI. Venezia 1856, pp. 543–673.
- Caprioli, Adriano; Vaccaro, Luciano (1992). Diocesi di Brescia (in Italian). Brescia: La Scuola. ISBN 978-88-350-7760-2.
- Eubel, Conradus, ed. (1913). Hierarchia catholica, Tomus 1 (second ed.). Münster: Libreria Regensbergiana. (in Latin)
- Eubel, Conradus, ed. (1914). Hierarchia catholica, Tomus 2 (second ed.). Münster: Libreria Regensbergiana.
- Gulik, Guilelmus (1923). Eubel, Conradus (ed.). Hierarchia catholica, Tomus 3 (second ed.). Münster: Libreria Regensbergiana.
- Gams, Pius Bonifatius (1873). Series episcoporum Ecclesiae catholicae: quotquot innotuerunt a beato Petro apostolo (in Latin). Ratisbon: Typis et Sumptibus Georgii Josephi Manz.
- Gauchat, Patritius (Patrice) (1935). Hierarchia catholica IV (1592-1667). Münster: Libraria Regensbergiana.
- Lanzoni, Francesco (1927). Le diocesi d'Italia dalle origini al principio del secolo VII (an. 604), vol. I, Faenza 1927, pp. 957–969.
- Montini, Chiara; Valetti, Ornello (1987). I Vescovi di Brescia: ricerca bibliografica (in Italian). Brescia: Ateneo.
- Ritzler, Remigius; Sefrin, Pirminus (1952). Hierarchia catholica medii et recentis aevi V (1667-1730). Patavii: Messagero di S. Antonio.
- Ritzler, Remigius; Sefrin, Pirminus (1958). Hierarchia catholica medii et recentis aevi VI (1730-1799). Patavii: Messagero di S. Antonio.
- Schwartz, Gerhard (1907). Die Besetzung der Bistümer Reichsitaliens unter den sächsischen und salischen Kaisern: mit den Listen der Bischöfe, 951-1122. Leipzig: B.G. Teubner. (in German)
- Taccolini, Mario (2004). Il Duomo Nuovo di Brescia: 1604-2004 : quattro secoli di arte, storia, fede (in Italian). Brescia: Grafo. ISBN 978-88-7385-618-4.
