= Antonio Lupi =

17th-century Roman Catholic bishop

Most Reverend Antonio Lupi
- Bishop of Treviso
- Church: Catholic Church
- In office: 1645–1668
- Predecessor: Marco Morosini
- Successor: Bartolomeo Gradenigo

Orders
- Consecration: 8 Oct 1645 by Giovanni Giacomo Panciroli

Personal details
- Born: 1598 Bergomo, Italy
- Died: 4 Jan 1668 (age 70)

Antonio Lupi (1598–1668) was a Roman Catholic prelate who served as Bishop of Treviso (1645–1668).

== Biography ==
Antonio Lupi was born in 1598 in Bergomo, Italy. On 21 Aug 1645, he was appointed during the papacy of Pope Innocent X as Bishop of Treviso. On 8 Oct 1645, he was consecrated bishop by Giovanni Giacomo Panciroli, Cardinal-Priest of Santo Stefano al Monte Celio, with Alfonso Gonzaga, Titular Archbishop of Rhodus, and Ranuccio Scotti Douglas, Bishop of Borgo San Donnino, serving as co-consecrators. He served as Bishop of Treviso until his death on 4 Jan 1668.

== External links and additional sources ==
- Cheney, David M. "Diocese of Treviso". Catholic-Hierarchy.org. (for Chronology of Bishops) ^{[self-published]}
- Chow, Gabriel. "Diocese of Treviso (Italy)". GCatholic.org. (for Chronology of Bishops) ^{[self-published]}

Catholic Church titles
Preceded by Marco Morosini	Bishop of Treviso; 1645–1668	Succeeded by Bartolomeo Gradenigo
