= Marco Morosini =

Italian Roman Catholic bishop

Most Reverend Marco Morosini
- Bishop of Brescia
- 17th-century portrait of Marco Morosini
- Church: Catholic Church
- In office: 1645–1654
- Predecessor: Vincenzo Giustiniani (bishop of Brescia)
- Successor: Pietro Vito Ottoboni
- Previous post: Bishop of Treviso (1639–1645)

Orders
- Consecration: 9 October 1639 by Federico Baldissera Bartolomeo Cornaro

Personal details
- Born: 1605 Venice, Republic of Venice
- Died: 4 October 1654 (age 49)

Marco Morosini (1605–1654) was an Italian Roman Catholic prelate who served as Bishop of Brescia (1645–1654) and Bishop of Treviso (1639–1645).

== Biography ==
Marco Morosini was born in 1605 in Venice, Republic of Venice. On 3 October 1639, he was appointed during the papacy of Pope Urban VIII as Bishop of Treviso. On 9 October 1639, he was consecrated bishop by Federico Baldissera Bartolomeo Cornaro, Patriarch of Venice, with Alfonso Gonzaga, Titular Archbishop of Rhodus, and Carlo Carafa, Bishop of Aversa, serving as co-consecrators. On 31 July 1645, he was appointed during the papacy of Pope Innocent X as Bishop of Brescia. He served as Bishop of Brescia until his death on 4 October 1654.

Catholic Church titles
| Preceded by Silvestro Morosini | Bishop of Treviso; 1639–1645 | Succeeded by Antonio Lupi |
| Preceded by Vincenzo Giustiniani (bishop of Brescia) | Bishop of Brescia; 1645–1654 | Succeeded by Pietro Vito Ottoboni |
