= Marcantonio Amulio =

Venetian ambassador and cardinal

Marco Antonio Da Mula
- Cardinal-Priest of San Marcello
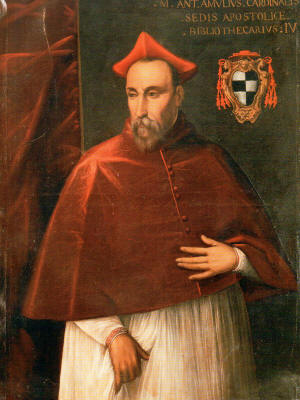
- Church: Catholic Church
- See: San Marcello al Corso
- In office: 10 March 1561 – 17 March 1572
- Predecessor: Giovanni Andrea Mercurio
- Successor: Marcantonio Bobba
- Other post: Bishop of Rieti (1562-1572)
- Previous post: Cardinal-Deacon of San Marcello (1561)

Orders
- Created cardinal: 26 February 1561 by Pope Pius IV

Personal details
- Born: 1506 Venice, Most Serene Republic of Venice
- Died: March 17, 1572 (aged 65–66) Rome, Papal States

Marco Antonio Da Mula, known as Cardinal Marcantonio Amulio (1506, Venice – 13 or 17 March 1572, Rome) was a Venetian ambassador and a cardinal of the Roman Catholic Church.

Marco Antonio Da Mula has been Venetian ambassador at the courts of Charles V (1552–54), Philip II (1559) and Pope Pius IV (1560–61). This pope named him cardinal on 26 February 1561. He was also the Bishop of Rieti, a member of the Holy Office and Cardinal Librarian of the Vatican Library. He died in Rome on 17 March 1572.

While bishop, he was the principal consecrator of: Eugenio Camuzzi, Bishop of Bobbio (1569)

Catholic Church titles
Preceded by Giovanni Andrea Mercurio	Cardinal-Deacon of San Marcello; 1561–1572	Succeeded by Marcantonio Bobba
Preceded by Giovanni Battista Osio	Bishop of Rieti; 1562–1572	Succeeded by Mariano Vittori
