= Marino Giovanni Zorzi =

Bishop of Brescia from 1664 to 1678

Most Reverend Marino Giovanni Zorzi
- Bishop of Brescia
- Portrait attributed to Francesco Paglia, 1676
- Church: Catholic Church
- Diocese: Diocese of Brescia
- In office: 1664–1678
- Predecessor: Pietro Vito Ottoboni
- Successor: Bartolomeo Gradenigo

Personal details
- Born: June 1634 Venice, Republic of Venice
- Died: 24 Oct 1678 (age 44) Brescia, Republic of Venice

Marino Giovanni Zorzi or Marino Giovanni Giorgi (1634–1678) was an Italian Roman Catholic prelate who served as Bishop of Brescia (1664–1678).

== Biography ==
A member of the patrician Zorzi family, Marino Giovanni Zorzi was born in June 1634 in Venice, Republic of Venice and ordained a priest in Dec 1658. On 9 Jun 1664, he was appointed during the papacy of Pope Alexander VII as Bishop of Brescia. He served as Bishop of Brescia until his death on 24 Oct 1678 in Brescia, Italy.

== See also ==
- Catholic Church in Italy

== External links and additional sources ==
- Cheney, David M. "Diocese of Brescia". Catholic-Hierarchy.org. (for Chronology of Bishops) ^{[self-published]}
- Chow, Gabriel. "Diocese of Brescia (Italy)". GCatholic.org. (for Chronology of Bishops) ^{[self-published]}

Catholic Church titles
Preceded by Pietro Vito Ottoboni	Bishop of Brescia; 1664–1678	Succeeded by Bartolomeo Gradenigo
