= Giovan Francesco Morosini (cardinal) =

Venetian cardinal

His Eminence Giovan Francesco Morosini
- Cardinal, Bishop of Brescia
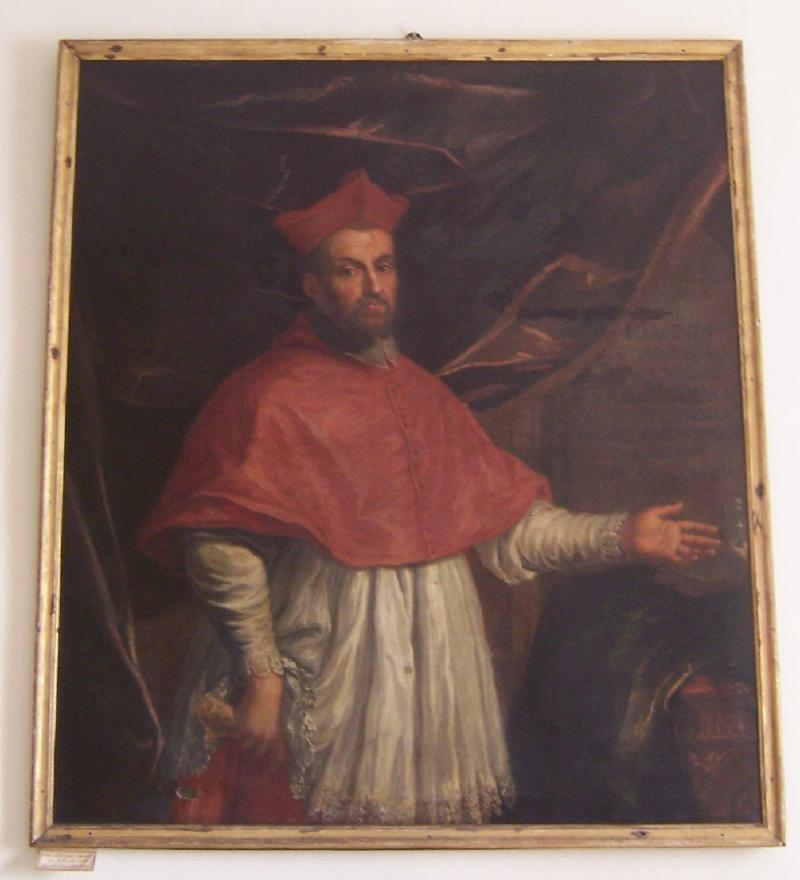
- Church: Catholic Church
- See: Brescia
- Appointed: 23 September 1585
- Term ended: 14 January 1596
- Predecessor: Giovanni Delfino
- Successor: Marino Zorzi
- Other post: Cardinal Priest of Santa Maria in Via

Orders
- Consecration: 3 November 1585 (Bishop) by Cesare Costa
- Created cardinal: 15 July 1588 by Pope Sixtus V

Personal details
- Born: 30 September 1537 Venice
- Died: 14 January 1596 (aged 58) Brescia
- Buried: Old Cathedral, Brescia

Giovan Francesco Morosini or Gianfrancesco Morosini (30 September 1537 – 14 January 1596) was a Venetian Catholic cardinal who served as Bishop of Brescia and Apostolic Nuncio in France.

== Life ==
Giovanni Francesco Morosini was born in Venice on 30 September 1537. He was the son of the Venetian patricians Pietro Morosini and Cornelia Corner, sister of cardinals Luigi and Federico Corner. His father, member of the Council of Ten, committed suicide on 21 March 1570.

Still young, he accompanied a relative in France, Alvise Badoer, who had been appointed extraordinary ambassador to that kingdom on behalf of the Republic of Venice. When he returned home, he was sent by the Republic of Venice to Charles II, Archduke of Austria, and on 1 May 1568 he was sent to the court of Emmanuel Philibert, Duke of Savoy, always as legate, leaving Turin on 29 September 1570.

In June 1573 Morosini was sent to Henry of Valois to pay homage to him on behalf of the Republic of Venice in the recent success of his obtaining the Polish crown. In December of that same year, he was appointed ambassador of Venice to the court of Charles IX of France, remaining there until the election of Henry III of France. From 1582 to 1585 he served as bailo to the Sultan Murad III in Constantinople.

In early 1585 Pope Gregory XIII selected him as the new bishop of Brescia after a secret consultation among the clergy of Venice, and this decision was confirmed by the new pope Sixtus V, who formally appointed him bishop of Brescia on 23 September 1585. Morosini at that time was still a layman, and he was ordained priest on October 1585 in Venice. The episcopal consecration followed on 3 November in the Venetian Church of San Giorgio Maggiore by the hands of Cesare Costa, Apostolic Nuncio to Venice.

Sixtus V sent him as his Apostolic Nuncio in France in May 1587. In the France scarred by the Wars of Religion, the duty of the Nuncio was to support the politic of Catherine de' Medici in trying to ally Henry III with the Catholic League led by the Henry I, Duke of Guise against the Huguenots. To support the Catholic war he was allowed by the Pope to sell estates of the Church, but this was fiercely opposed by the French clergy. Nor he succeeded to have the decrees of the Council of Trent published in French. He asked to the Pope to side with Henry III against the Duke of Guise, but this position was not supported by the Pope who more and more became displeased of his nuncio. In the events of the Day of the Barricades he tried to riconciliate the leaders of the Catholic League with Henry III. A few months later, the murders of Louis II, Cardinal of Guise and of the Duke of Guise by order of Henry III marked the failure of his politic.

In the meantime, on 15 July 1588 he was elected Cardinal priest with the title of Santi Nereo e Achilleo. In 1590 he changed his title to that of Santa Maria in Via.

Having returned to Italy from France in September 1589, he went to Rome where he was charged with not having excommunicated Henry III of France after the murders of the Cardinal of Guise and of the Duke of Guise by order of that king.

Appointed protector of Germany and Hungary, he was a close friend of Saint Philip Neri and his supporter. He died in Brescia on 14 January 1596 and was buried in the Old Cathedral of that town. He left his goods to the hospital of Brescia.
