= Annibale Bozzuti =

Italian Roman Catholic bishop and cardinal

Annibale Bozzuti (1521–1565) was an Italian Roman Catholic bishop and cardinal.

== Biography ==
Annibale Bozzuti was born in Montecalvo Irpino, Kingdom of Naples on 2 February 1521, the son of Ludovico Bozzuti and Lucrezia Guindazzi. He was from a Neapolitan patrician family.

He became a doctor of both laws before becoming a cleric in Naples. In 1547 he was Neapolitan ambassador to Charles V, Holy Roman Emperor. Under Pope Paul III, he moved to Rome, becoming a protonotary apostolic participantium. The pope made him a domestic prelate of His Holiness on 4 June 1549. On 6 June 1549 he was named pro-legate in Bologna. He later became a referendary of the Apostolic Signatura. He was governor of Borgo in 1550.

On 15 June 1551 he was elected to be Archbishop of Avignon. He was governor of Borgo again in 1555. He joined the Apostolic Camera on 28 February 1556, later serving as its president under Pope Paul IV. On 26 January 1558 he was named governor of Civitavecchia. He resigned the government of the Archdiocese of Avignon in 1562.

Pope Pius IV made him a cardinal priest in the consistory of 12 March 1565. He received the red hat and the titular church of San Silvestro in Capite on 15 May 1565.

He died in Chiace, near Naples, on 6 October 1565. He was buried in Naples Cathedral.
