= Daniello Marco Delfino =

Italian cardinal

- Cardinal-Priest of Santa Susanna
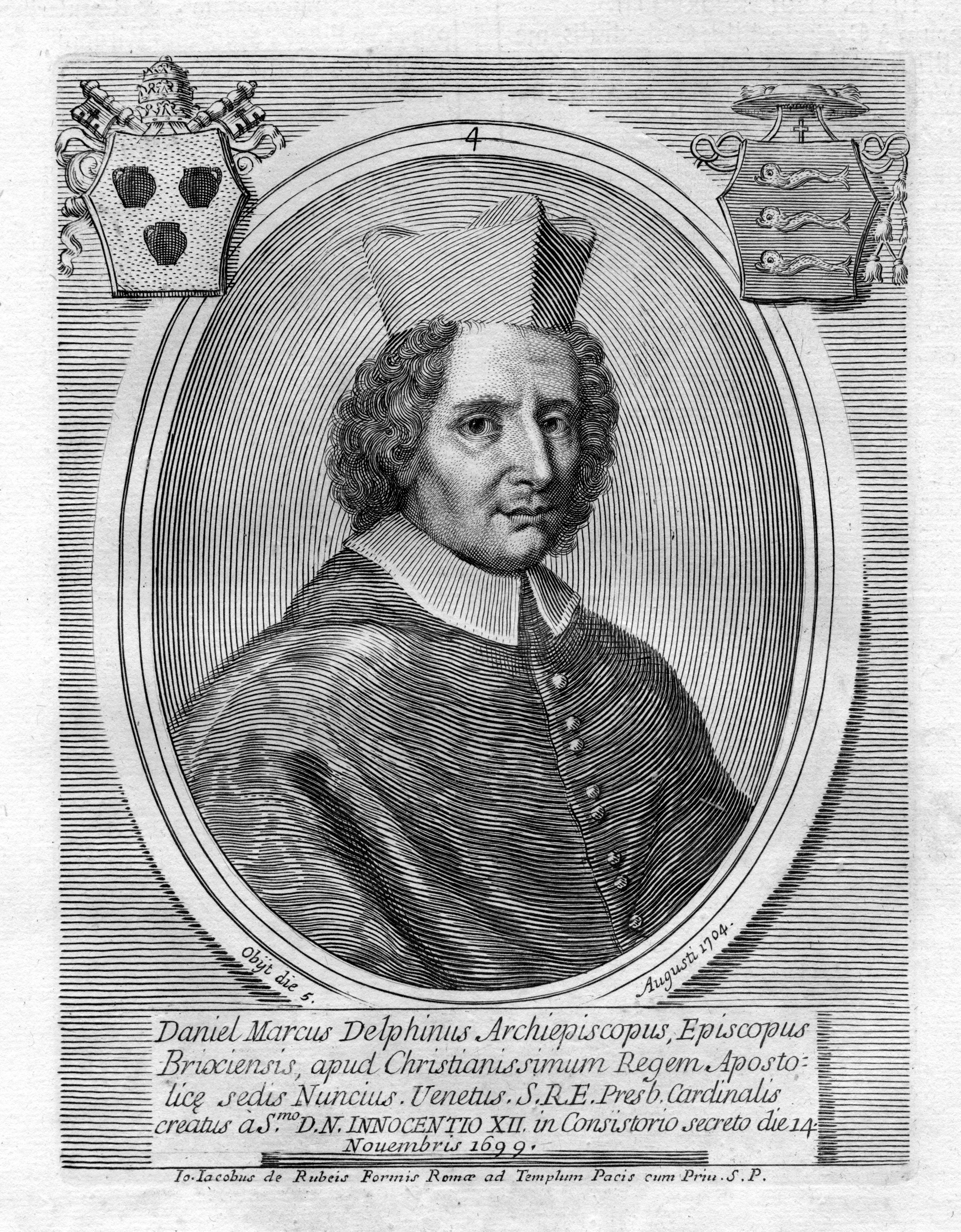
- Church: Catholic Church
- See: Santa Susanna
- In office: 30 March 1700 – 5 August 1704
- Predecessor: Marcantonio Barbarigo
- Successor: lorenzo Corsini
- Other post: Bishop of Brescia (1698-1704)
- Previous posts: Apostolic Nuncio to France (1696-1700); Titular Archbishop of Damascus (1696-1698)

Orders
- Consecration: 29 January 1696 by Louis d'Aube de Roquemartine
- Created cardinal: 14 November 1699 by Pope Innocent XII

Personal details
- Born: 5 October 1653 Venice, Republic of Venice
- Died: 5 August 1704 (aged 50) Brescia, Republic of Venice

Daniello Marco Dolfino or Daniel Marc Delfin (born 5 October 1653 in Venice, then in the Republic of Venice and died in Brescia on 5 August 1704) is an Italian cardinal of the late seventeenth and early eighteenth century and member of the noble family Delfin. He is a grand-nephew of Cardinal Giovanni Delfino (seniore) (1604) and a nephew of Cardinal Giovanni Delfino (iuniore) (1667).

== Biography ==
Dolfino performs functions in the Roman Curia, including as a referendum to the Supreme Court of the Apostolic Signatura. He was vice-legate at Avignon from 1692 to 1696. He was elected titular archbishop of Damascus and sent as apostolic nuncio to France in 1696. Delfin was transferred to the diocese of Brescia in 1698.

Pope Innocent XII created him cardinal during the consistory of 14 November 1699. He is abbot commendatory of Rosazzo. Delfin participates in the conclave of 1700, during which Clement XI is elected.
