= San Silvestro in Capite =

Church of Saint Sylvester the First
- San Silvestro in Capite (Italian); Sancti Silvestri in Capite (Latin)
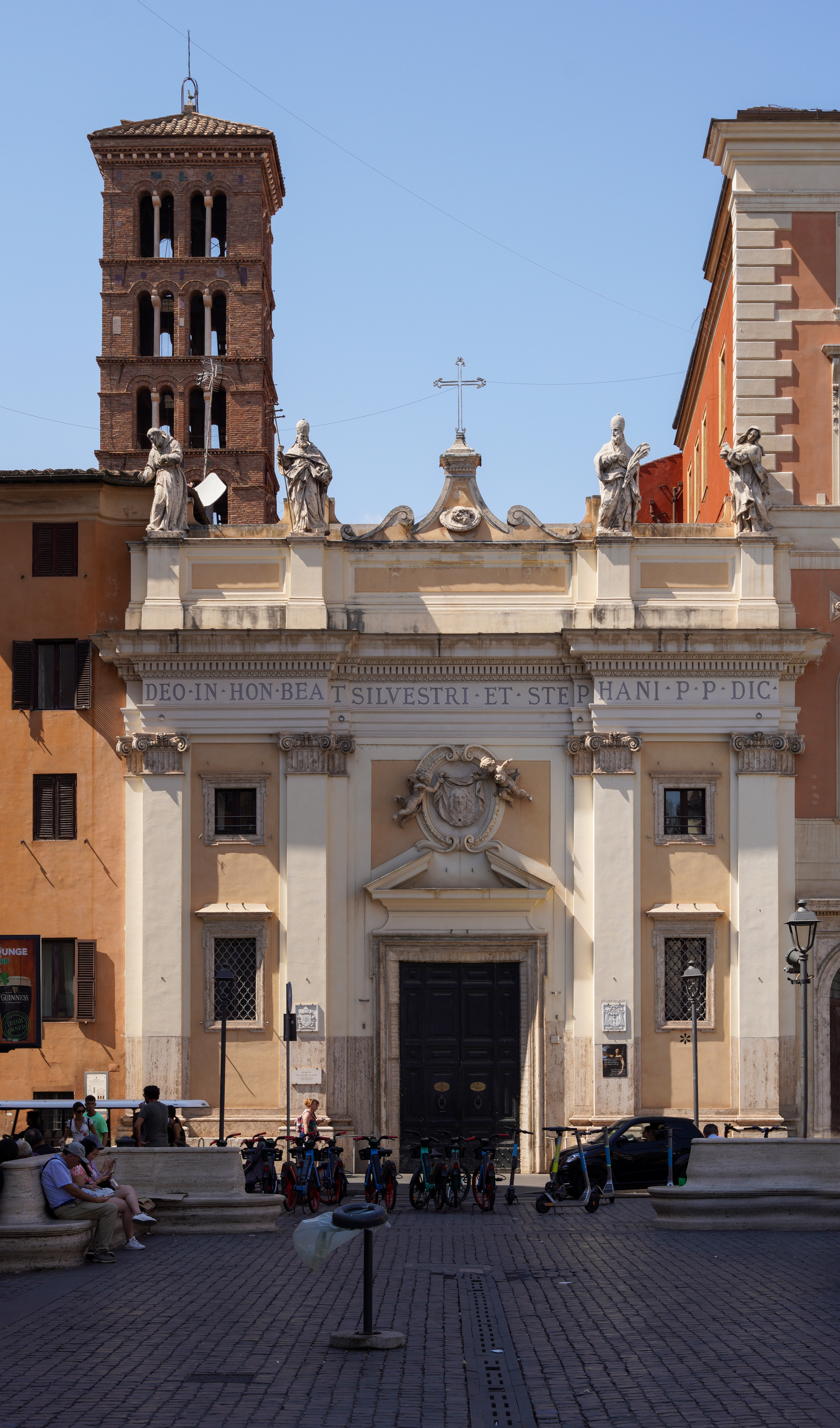
- Façade of San Silvestro in Capite, National Church in Rome of English Catholics, on Piazza San Silvestro. Beyond the portal, there is an atrium, with access to the church.
- Click on the map for a fullscreen view
- 41°54′11″N 12°28′50″E
- Location: Piazza di S. Silvestro 17A; Rome
- Country: Italy
- Denomination: Catholic
- Religious institute: Pallottines

History
- Status: Minor basilica, Titular church, English national church
- Dedication: Pope St Sylvester I: St John the Baptist; St Tarcisius; St Stephen I

Architecture
- Architect(s): Francesco da Volterra; Carlo Maderno
- Style: Romanesque, Baroque
- Groundbreaking: 761

Specifications
- Length: 40 m (130 ft)
- Width: 20 m (66 ft)

The Basilica of Saint Sylvester the First, also known as (Italian: San Silvestro in Capite, Latin: Sancti Silvestri in Capite), is a Roman Catholic minor basilica and titular church in Rome dedicated to Pope Sylvester I (d. AD 335). It is located on the Piazza San Silvestro, at the corner of Via del Gambero and the Via della Mercede, and stands adjacent to the central Post Office.

Built in the 8th century as a shrine for the relics of the saints and martyrs from the Catacombs, the church is the National Church in Rome of Great Britain. The Latin words "in capite" refers to the canonical title of Pope Sylvester the First, to which in capite means in First, in Chief, or in Head. The basilica is also famous for a relic, a fragment of a head purported to be that of John the Baptist, kept in a chapel to the left of the entrance. A second Roman church dedicated to Pope Sylvester I is San Silvestro al Quirinale.

The current Cardinal-Priest is Louis-Marie Ling Mangkhanekhoun, the former Apostolic Vicar of Vientiane and the first cardinal from Laos.

== History ==
The original church was built with an adjoining Basilian monastery, in the 8th century by the Popes Paul I and Stephen III, atop ruins of a pagan temple dedicated to Sol Invictus, to house venerated relics of early Christian saints who were buried in the catacombs. The church was rebuilt and the campanile with Romanesque arcades added in 1198 during the papacy of Innocent III, who transferred the relic of the head of St. John the Baptist to it and the name was changed to St. John in Capitol.

In the 13th century the church was donated to the Poor Clares. It was rebuilt by the architects Francesco Capriani da Volterra and Carlo Maderno during 1591–1601, and subsequently restored in 1681.

The relics of Pope Sylvester I, Pope Stephen I and Pope Dionysius were exhumed and re-enshrined beneath the high altar when the new church was consecrated in 1601. The church also contains the relics of Tarcisius.

The church of San Silvestro was granted to the English Catholics by Pope Leo XIII in 1890, and is now served by Irish Pallottine Fathers. Mass is thus regularly celebrated in the English language. The church is the National Church in Rome of Great Britain, although the structures of the Catholic Church continue to be organized separately for England and Wales, Scotland and Ireland. The Scottish national church in Rome, Sant'Andrea degli Scozzesi, was deconsecrated in 1962.

== Exterior ==
The church has an atrium and narthex, which isolates the church from the busy square outside. There are fragments of early Christian sculpture, many with inscriptions, embedded in the walls of the atrium.

The façade was completed in 1703. It has an unusual giant order topped with four baroque statues: San Silvestro by Lorenzo Ouone, Saint Stephen by Michelangelo Borgognone, Saint Clare by Giuseppe Mazzoni and Saint Francis by Vincenzo Felice.

== Interior ==
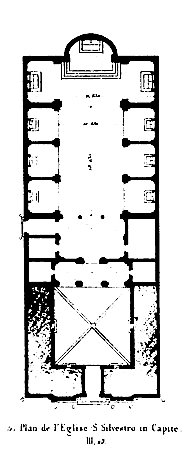
Plan of S. Silvestro

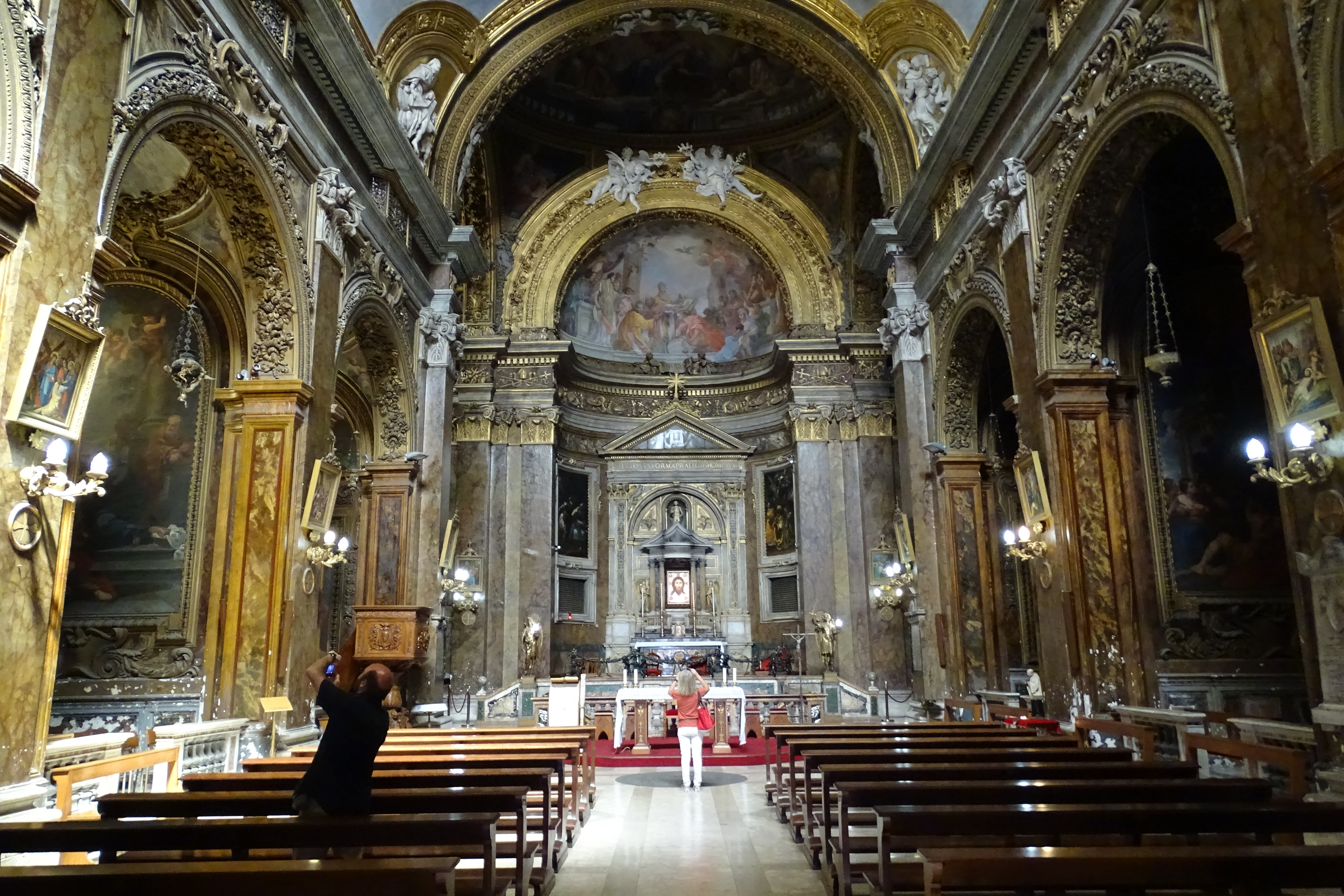
Church interior

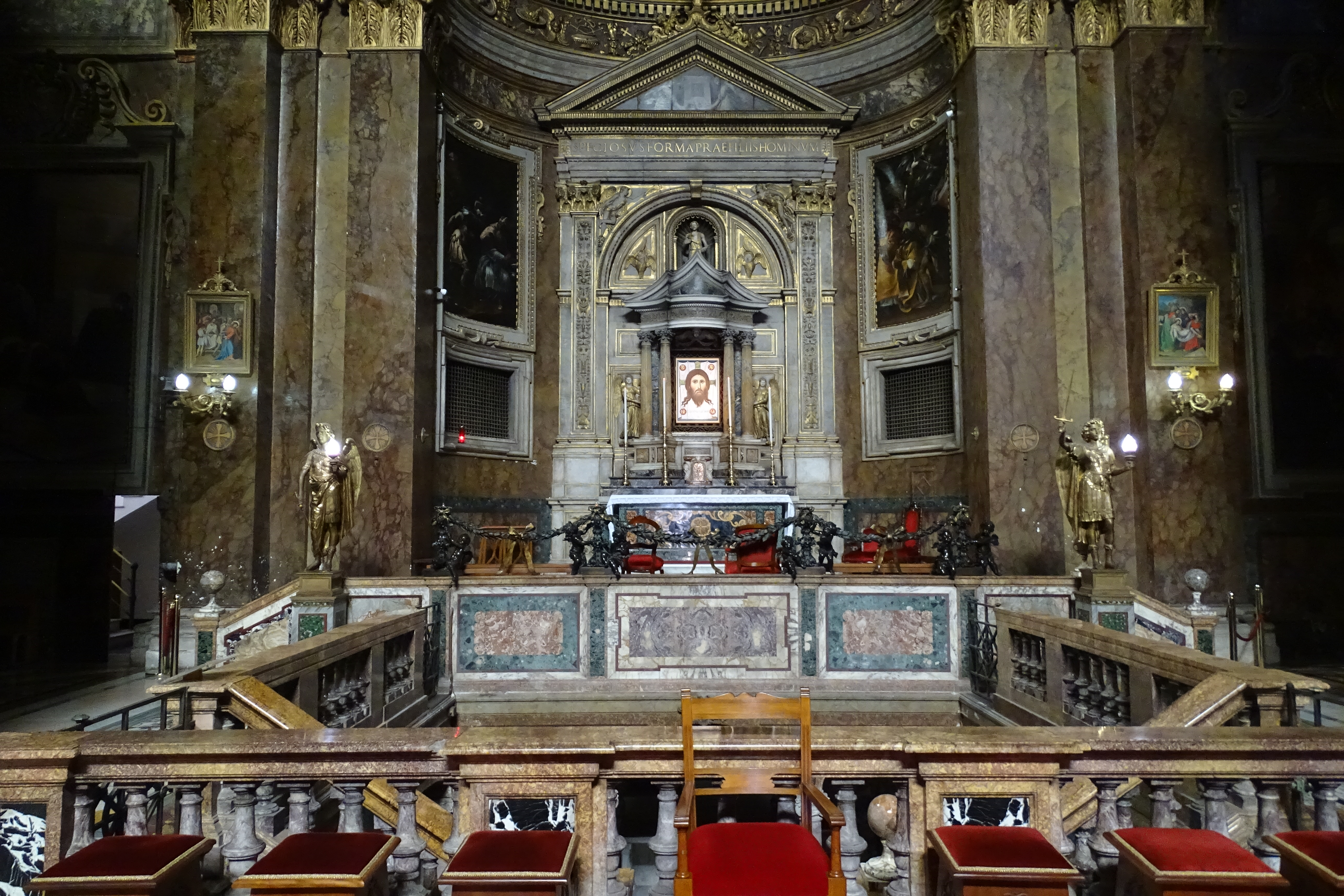
High Altar, commissioned in 1518 by Pier Soderini of Florence

It is believed that the high altar, which predates the present church, was influenced by the style of Michelangelo. The interior is rich in marble, gilding, and artistic decoration. The nave has an Assumption with Saints frescoed (1680) by Giacinto Brandi. The main altar carved ciborium or canopy (1667) by Carlo Rainaldi. The cupola was frescoed (1605) by Cristoforo Roncalli. A Martyrdom of San Stephan I and a Messengers of Constantine call on San Silvestro (1610) were frescoed in the apse by Orazio Borgianni. In the baptistry apse, there is a Baptism of Constantine by Ludovico Gimignani. The transept has a History of San Silvestro (1690) also by Gimignani, and a Madonna with Child by Baccio Ciarpi.

In the first chapel to the right is a Madonna with Child & Saint Anthony of Padua & Stephen I and other saints (1695) by Giuseppe Bartolomeo Chiari. In the second chapel is a Saint Francis receives stigmata (1610) by Orazio Gentileschi accompanied by paintings of the life of the saint by Luigi Garzi. In the third, a Pentecost by Giuseppe Ghezzi. The left transept has a Madonna & Child by Terenzio Terenzi. In the third chapel on the left is a fresco of the Immaculate Conception by Gimignani. On the walls are an Adoration by the Magi and Visitation by the Milanese il Morrazzone. In the second chapel is a Pope San Marcello has a vision of the Sacred Family and a Transit and Glory of San Giuseppe by Gimignani. In the first chapel are canvases of the Passion (1695) by Francesco Trevisani.

== Convent ==
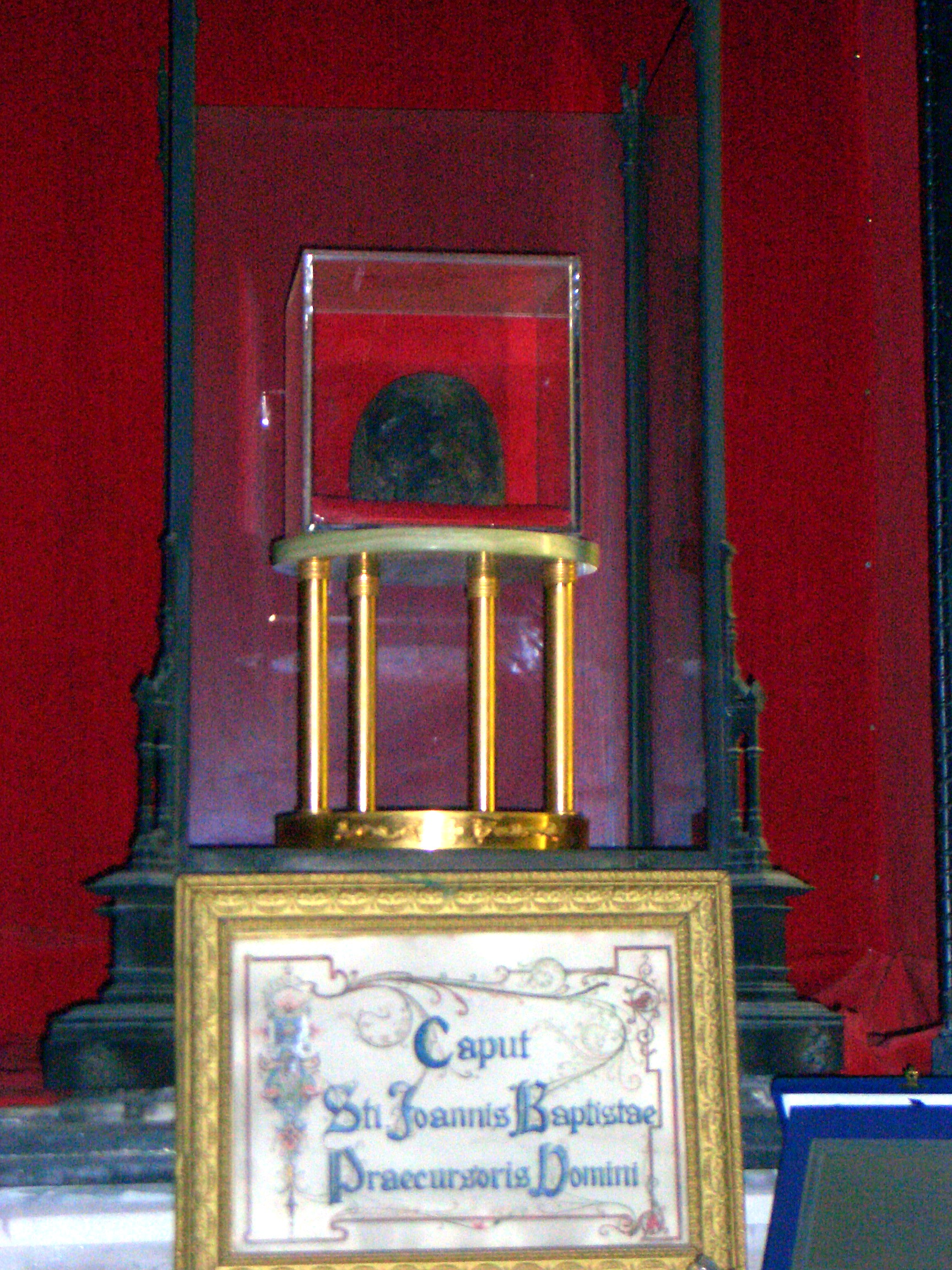
A head said to be John the Baptist's, enshrined at San Silvestro.

A convent dedicated to Pope Sylvester I and Pope Stephen I was built adjacent to the church. During the Roman Republic of 1849, the nuns were expelled from the convent so that it could be used as a barracks by Giuseppe Garibaldi and his volunteers. They returned after the French recovered the city and remained there until 1876, when they were dispossessed. The convent has since been renovated and continues to serve as the main Post Office of Rome.

== List of Cardinal-Priests since 1517 ==
List of the cardinal titulars of the church

- Louis II de Bourbon de Vendôme (6 July 1517 – 11 June 1521)
- Uberto Gàmbara (28 January 1540 – 23 March 1541)
- Tommaso Badia (12 June 1542 – 6 September 1547)
- Fabio Mignanelli (4 December 1551 – 12 June 1556)
- Taddeo Gaddi (24 March 1557 – 22 December 1561)
- Annibale Bozzuti (15 May 1565 – 6 October 1565)
- Marcantonio Bobba (8 February 1566 – 2 June 1572)
- François de Joyeuse (20 May 1585 – 11 December 1587)
- Francisco de Ávila (21 April 1597 – 8 January 1599)
- Pierre de Gondi (23 May 1588 – 17 February 1616)
- Franz Seraph von Dietrichstein (17 March 1599 – 27 September 1623)
- Melchior Klesl (20 November 1623 – 1 July 1624)
- Giovanni Battista Maria Pallotta (26 May 1631 – 23 September 1652)
- Girolamo Colonna (23 September 1652 – 9 June 1653)
- Domingo Pimentel Zúñiga, O.P. (23 June - 2 December 1653)
- Carlo Rossetti (9 March 1654 – 14 November 1672)
- Gasparo Carpegna (14 November 1672 – 19 October 1689)
- Giovanni Francesco Albani (30 March 1700 – 23 November 1700)
- Girolamo Casanate (7 November 1689 – 3 March 1700)
- Johann Philipp von Lamberg (3 January 1701 – 21 October 1712)
- Lodovico Pico della Mirandola (21 November 1712 – 24 April 1728)
- Prospero Marefoschi (20 September 1728 – 24 February 1732)
- Francesco Scipione Maria Borghese (31 March 1732 – 20 May 1743)
- Vincenzo Bichi (20 May 1743 – 23 September 1743)
- Antonio Maria Ruffo (23 September 1743 – 22 February 1753)
- Federico Marcello Lante Montefeltro della Rovere (9 April 1753 – 13 July 1759)
- Ferdinando Maria De Rossi (19 November 1759 – 14 December 1767)
- François-Joachim de Pierre de Bernis (26 June 1769 – 18 April 1774)
- Innocenzo Conti (3 April 1775 – 15 December 1783)
- Giovanni Maria Riminaldi (29 January 1787 – 12 October 1789)
- Francesco Carrara (11 April 1791 – 26 March 1793)
- Carlo Livizzani Forni (21 February 1794 – 1 July 1802)
- Bartolomeo Pacca (9 August 1802 – 2 October 1818)
- Antonio Pallotta (16 May 1823 – 19 July 1834)
- Luigi Bottiglia Savoulx (1 August 1834 – 14 September 1836)
- Costantino Patrizi Naro (21 November 1836 – 20 April 1849)
- Jacques-Marie-Adrien-Césaire Mathieu (18 March 1852 – 9 July 1875)
- Louis-Marie Caverot (25 June 1877 – 24 March 1884)
- Vicenzo Vannutelli (4 June 1891 – 19 April 1900)
- Donato Sbarretti (6 December 1916 – 17 December 1928)
- Luigi Lavitrano (19 December 1929 – 2 August 1950)
- Valerio Valeri (15 January 1953 – 22 July 1963)
- John Carmel Heenan (25 February 1965 – 7 November 1975)
- George Hume (24 May 1976 – 17 June 1999)
- Desmond Connell (21 February 2001 – 21 February 2017)
- Louis-Marie Ling Mangkhanekhoun (28 June 2017 – present)

== See also ==
- Santi Claudio e Andrea dei Borgognoni
- San Lorenzo in Lucina

== Notes ==
Preceded by San Sebastiano fuori le mura	Landmarks of Rome; San Silvestro in Capite	Succeeded by San Sisto Vecchio
