= Pope Pius IV =

Head of the Catholic Church from 1559 to 1565

- Bishop of Rome
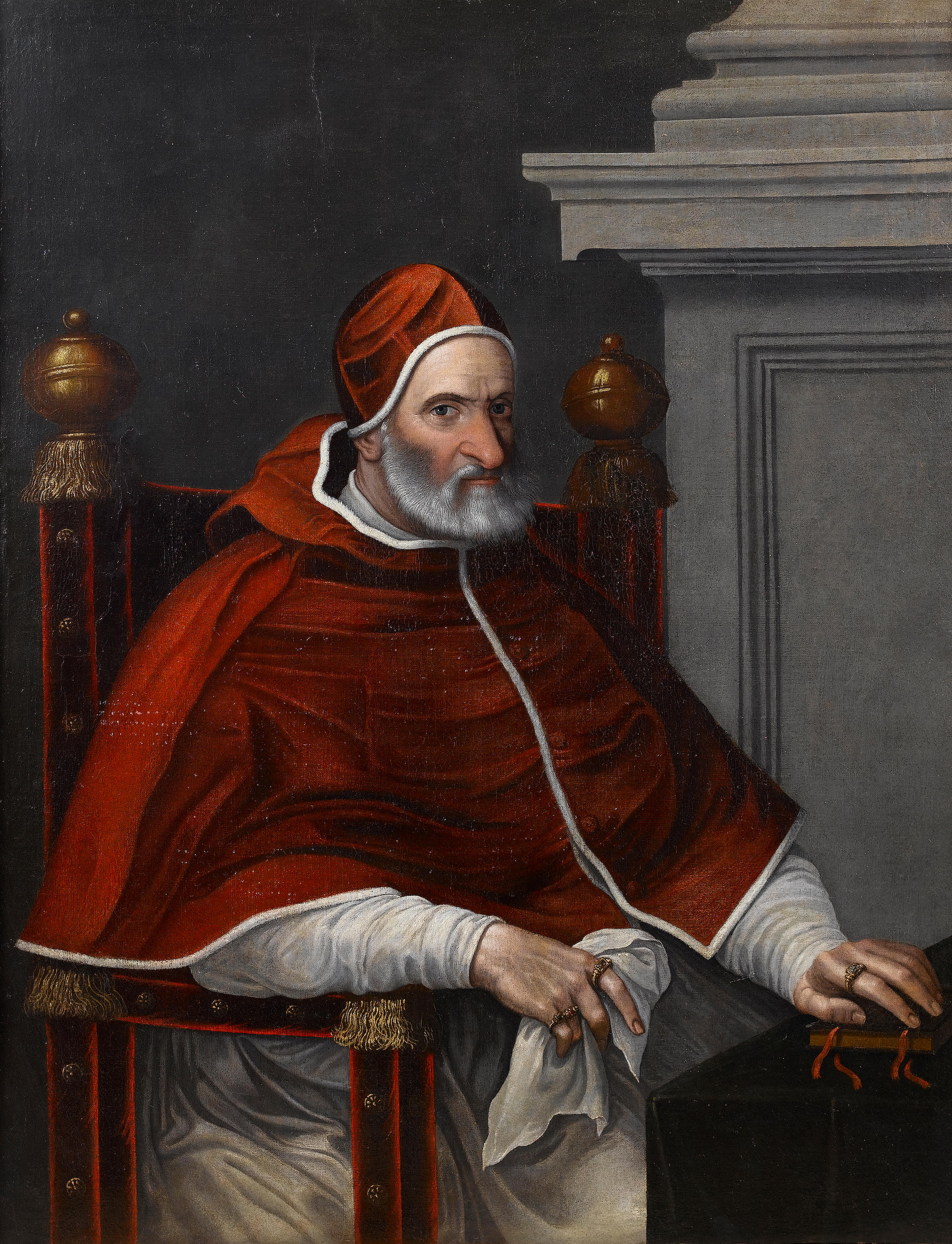
- Portrait by Scipione Pulzone, c. 1560s
- Church: Catholic Church
- Papacy began: 25 December 1559
- Papacy ended: 9 December 1565
- Predecessor: Paul IV
- Successor: Pius V
- Previous posts: Archbishop of Ragusa (1545–1553); Cardinal-Priest of Santa Pudenziana (1549–1550); Cardinal-Priest of Santa Anastasia (1550–1552); Apostolic Administrator of Cassano all'Jonio (1553–1556); Cardinal-Priest of San Stefano al Monte Celio (1553–1557); Bishop of Foligno (1556–1557); Cardinal-Priest of Santa Prisca (1557–1559); Apostolic Administrator of Milan (1559–1560)

Orders
- Ordination: 14 December 1545
- Consecration: 20 April 1546 by Filippo Archinto
- Created cardinal: 8 April 1549 by Paul III

Personal details
- Born: Giovanni Angelo Medici; 31 March 1499 Milan, Duchy of Milan
- Died: 9 December 1565 (aged 66) Rome, Papal States

- Coat of arms

Papal styles of Pope Pius IV
- Reference style: His Holiness
- Spoken style: Your Holiness
- Religious style: Holy Father
- Posthumous style: None

Pope Pius IV (Italian: Pio IV; 31 March 1499 – 9 December 1565), born Giovanni Angelo Medici, was head of the Catholic Church and ruler of the Papal States from 25 December 1559 to his death, in December 1565.

Pope Paul III appointed Medici Archbishop of Ragusa, and sent him on diplomatic missions to the Holy Roman Empire and Hungary. He presided over the final session of the Council of Trent. His nephew, Cardinal Charles Borromeo, was a close adviser. As pope, Pius IV initiated a number of building projects in Rome, including one to improve the water supply.

== Life ==
=== Early life ===
Giovanni Angelo Medici was born in Milan on 31 March 1499 as the second of eleven children to Bernardino Medici and Clelia Serbelloni. Medici studied philosophy and medicine in Pavia. After studying at University of Bologna and acquiring a reputation as a jurist he obtained his doctorate in both canon and civil law on 11 May 1525. Medici went in 1527 to Rome, and as a favourite of Pope Paul III was rapidly promoted to the governorship of several towns, the archbishopric of Ragusa (1545–1553), and the vice-legateship of Bologna.

His family considered itself a branch of the House of Medici and used the same coat of arms. Although modern historians have found no proof of this connection, the Medici of Florence recognised the claims of the Medici of Milan in the early 16th century.

=== Cardinalate ===
On 8 April 1549, Pope Paul III made Medici a cardinal, receiving his red hat and titular church title on the following 10 May. Under Papal authority, he was sent on diplomatic missions to the Holy Roman Empire and also to Hungary.

== Pontificate ==
=== Election ===
On the death of Pope Paul IV, he was elected pope on 25 December 1559, taking the name Pius IV, and installed on 6 January 1560. His first public acts of importance were to grant a general pardon to the participants in the riot after the death of his predecessor, and to bring to trial the nephews of his predecessor. Pius had Cardinal Carlo Carafa, Alfonso, and Duke Giovanni Carafa of Paliano arrested and imprisoned. Carlo was strangled, while Giovanni was beheaded along with Ferrante Garlonio and Leonardo de Cardena.

=== Council of Trent ===
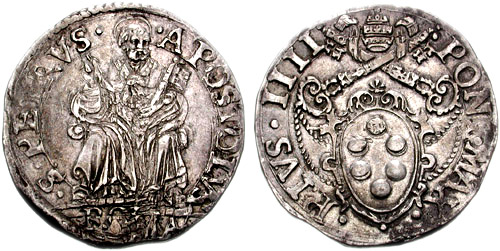
Testone coin with arms of Pius IV

On 18 January 1562 the Council of Trent, which had been suspended by Pope Julius III, was convened by Pius IV for the third and final time. Great skill and caution were necessary to effect a settlement of the questions before it, inasmuch as the three principal nations taking part in it, though at issue with regard to their own special demands, were prepared to unite their forces against the demands of Rome. Pius IV, however, aided by Giovanni Morone and Charles Borromeo, proved himself equal to the emergency, and by judicious management – and concession – brought the council to a termination satisfactory to the disputants and favourable to the pontifical authority. Its definitions and decrees were confirmed by a papal bull ("Benedictus Deus") dated 26 January 1564; and, though they were received with certain limitations by France and Spain, the famous Creed of Pius IV, or Tridentine Creed, became an authoritative expression of the Catholic faith. The more marked manifestations of stringency during his pontificate appear to have been prompted rather than spontaneous, his personal character inclining him to moderation and ease.

So, although he summoned Jeanne d'Albret, the Queen of Navarre, before the Inquisition on a charge of Calvinism, he backed down after the indignant protest of Charles IX of France. In the same year he published a bull granting the use of the cup to the laity of Austria and Bohemia. One of his strongest passions appears to have been that of building, which somewhat strained his resources in contributing to the adornment of Rome (including the new Porta Pia and Via Pia, named after him, and the northern extension (Addizione) of the rione of Borgo), and in carrying on the work of restoration, erection, and fortification in various parts of the ecclesiastical states.

On the other hand, others bemoaned the austere Roman culture during his papacy; Giorgio Vasari in 1567 spoke of a time when "the grandeurs of this place reduced by stinginess of living, dullness of dress, and simplicity in so many things; Rome is fallen into much misery, and if it is true that Christ loved poverty and the City wishes to follow in his steps she will quickly become beggarly...".

=== Doctrinal teachings ===
In addition to Benedictus Deus, Pius issued a papal bull on 24 March 1564 entitled Dominici Gregis Custodiae which set out the rules for forbidding books, including the stipulation that reading a vernacular translation of the Old Testament was restricted to learned and pious men who had episcopal permission.

=== Consistories ===
Pius IV created 46 cardinals in four consistories during his pontificate, and elevated three nephews to the cardinalate, including Charles Borromeo. The pope also made Ugo Boncompagni, who would later be elected Pope Gregory XIII, a cardinal. In 1561, the pope nominated Daniele Barbaro as a cardinal "in pectore"; however, the nomination was never publicly revealed. In 1565, Pius IV offered the cardinalate to Jean Parisot de Valette, the grand master of the Order of Malta, in recognition for his defense of Malta against the Ottoman Empire; however, he declined the pope's invitation.

=== Conspiracy ===
A conspiracy against Pope Pius IV was discovered and suppressed in 1565. The plot was led by Benedetto Accolti, who planned to present the Pope with a demand for his abdication and, if that failed, to assassinate him with a poisoned dagger. Accolti's motivations were partly personal, but also stemmed from dissatisfaction among Romans with Pius IV's pontificate, particularly his tax increases. Accolti was the illegitimate son of a cardinal.

=== Roman ghetto ===
The strict laws established by Pope Paul IV establishing the Jewish Roman Ghetto were loosened by Pius IV, allowing Jews to own property worth up to 1500 ducats, and to do business of any kind with Christians except hire them as servants. Rent in the ghetto could not be "exorbitant", but would be set by the executive of the city.

=== Architectural achievements ===
During the reign of Pius IV, Michelangelo rebuilt the basilica of Santa Maria degli Angeli (in Diocletian's Baths) and the eponymous Villa Pia, now known as Casina Pio IV, in the Vatican Gardens designed by Pirro Ligorio. It is now the headquarters of the Pontifical Academy of Sciences. He also assigned Michelangelo to build Porta Pia.

Pius IV also ordered public construction to improve the water supply of Rome.

=== Beatifications ===
During his papacy, Pius IV canonised no saints and only beatified one individual, Gundisalvus of Amarante, on 16 September 1561.

== Death ==
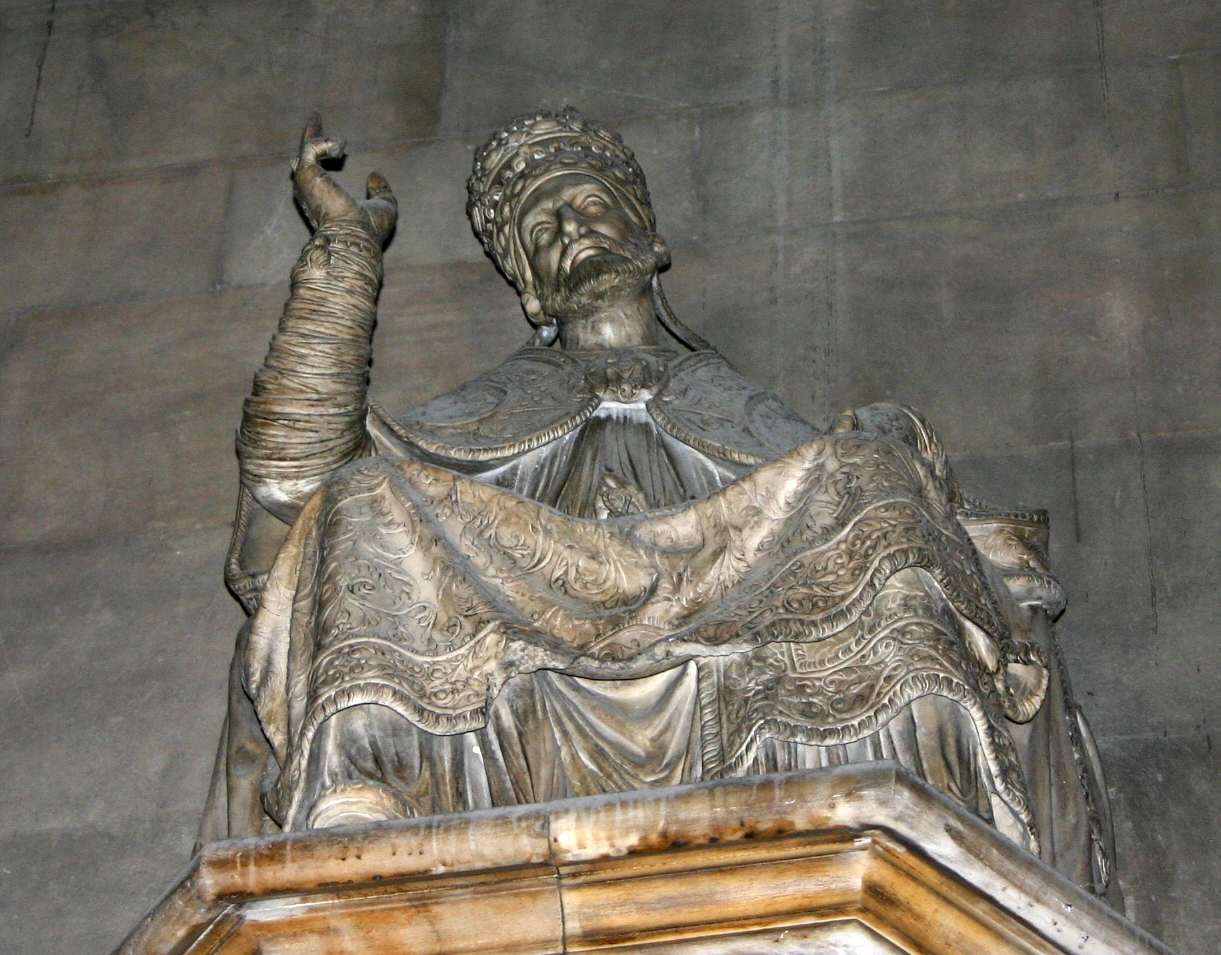
Monument in Milan Cathedral

Pius IV died on 9 December 1565 from complications following an infection in the urinary tract and a high fever. He was buried in Santa Maria degli Angeli on 4 January 1583 after his remains were initially housed at Saint Peter's Basilica. His successor was Pius V.

Pius IV suffered from many illnesses such as gout which restricted his mobility. Giacomo Soranzo remarked between May and August 1565 to the Venetian Senate about the pope's health, commenting that he possessed a great natural vigor. However, gout impeded movement in his legs, shoulders, arms, and hands. Sorzano also mentioned that this meant that the pope, more often than not, needed to be carried in the sedia gestatoria to avoid walking. Pius IV also suffered from a major illness in 1564 from which he recovered.

However, the pope fell ill eight days before his death with a constant fever throughout the duration. Borromeo, who arrived in Rome during the evening on 8 December, was with the pope when Pius died alongside Saint Philip Neri.

== See also ==
- Cardinals created by Pius IV
- House of Medici
- List of popes from the Medici family

== Sources ==
- Loughlin, James (1911). "Pope Pius IV". The Catholic Encyclopedia. Vol. 12. Robert Appleton Company.
- Pattenden, Miles (2023). "Regime Change in Papal Rome: Pius IV and the Carafa (1559-1561)". In Lee, Alexander; Maxson, Brian Jeffrey (eds.). The Culture and Politics of Regime Change in Italy, C.1494-c.1559. Routledge. ISBN 9781032057552.
- Roelker, Nancy Lyman (1968). Jeanne d'Albret, Queen of Navarre, 1528 - 1572. Harvard University Press.
- Rurale, Flavio (2000). "Pio IV". Enciclopedia dei Papi (in Italian). Treccani.
- Scappi, Bartolomeo (2008). The Opera of Bartolomeo Scappi (1570): L'Arte Et Prudenza D'Un Maestro Cuoco. Translated by Scully, Terence. University of Toronto Press. ISBN 978-0-8020-9624-1.
- Thompson, Bard (1996). Humanists and Reformers: A History of the Renaissance and Reformation. Wm. B. Eerdmans Publishing Co. ISBN 978-0802836915.

Catholic Church titles
Preceded by Paul IV	Pope; 1559–1565	Succeeded by Pius V
Preceded by Panfilo Strassoldo	Archbishop of Ragusa; 1545–1553	Succeeded by Lodovico Beccatelli
