= Alessandro Filonardi =

17th-century Roman Catholic bishop

Most Reverend Alessandro Filonardi
- Bishop of Aquino
- Church: Catholic Church
- Diocese: Diocese of Aquino
- In office: 1615–1645
- Predecessor: Filippo Filonardi
- Successor: Angelo Maldachini

Orders
- Consecration: 31 May 1615 by Filippo Filonardi

Personal details
- Born: Terra Balbaei

Alessandro Filonardi (died 1645) was a Roman Catholic prelate who served as Bishop of Aquino (1615–1645).

== Biography ==
Alessandro Filonardi was born in Terra Balbaei. On 18 May 1615, he was appointed during the papacy of Pope Paul V as Bishop of Aquino. On 31 May 1615, he was consecrated bishop by Filippo Filonardi, Cardinal-Priest of Santa Maria del Popolo, with Paolo de Curtis, Bishop Emeritus of Isernia, and Ennio Filonardi, Bishop of Ferentino, serving as co-consecrators. He served as Bishop of Aquino until his death on 21 Jan 1645.

== Episcopal succession ==
While bishop, he was the principal co-consecrator of:

- Giovanni Battista Malaspina, Bishop of Massa Marittima (1629);
- Muzio Colonna, Bishop of Marsi (1629);
- Vittore Capello, Titular Bishop of Famagusta (1633);
- Antonio Maria Pranzoni, Bishop of Minervino Murge (1635);
- Bartolomeo Cresconi, Bishop of Umbriatico (1639);
- Francesco d'Elia e Rossi, Bishop of Siracusa (1639);
- Gerolamo Mascambruno, Bishop of Isernia (1642); and
- Francesco Agostino della Chiesa, Bishop of Saluzzo (1642).

== External links and additional sources ==
- Cheney, David M. "Diocese of Aquino e Pontecorvo". Catholic-Hierarchy.org. (for Chronology of Bishops) ^{[self-published]}
- Chow, Gabriel. "Diocese of Aquino (Italy)". GCatholic.org. (for Chronology of Bishops) ^{[self-published]}

Catholic Church titles
Preceded by Filippo Filonardi	Bishop of Aquino; 1615–1645	Succeeded by Angelo Maldachini
