= Chiesa del Cristo, Venafro =

Roman Catholic church in Venafro, Italy

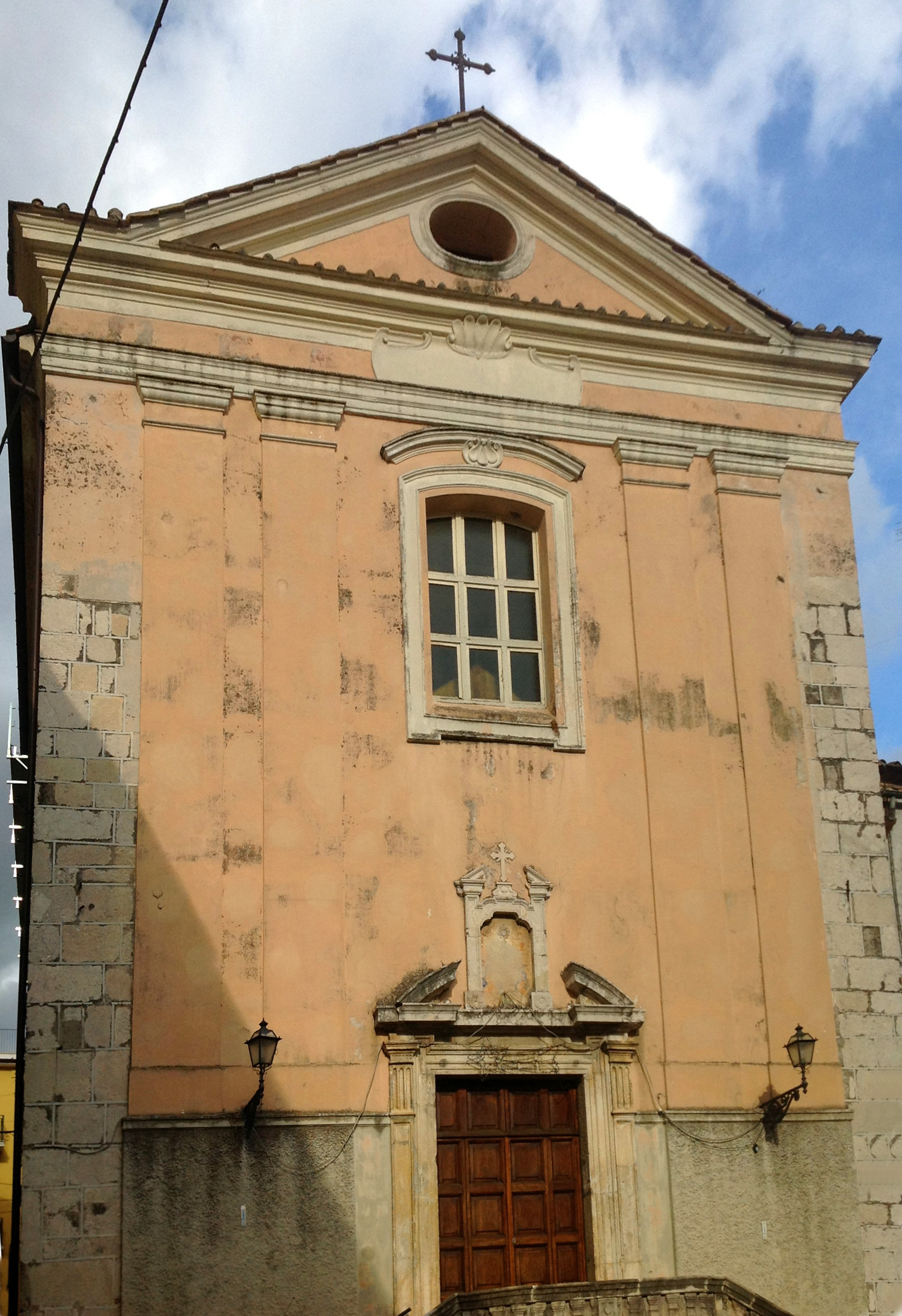

The Chiesa del Cristo is a Renaissance-style church located on the center square of Venafro, province of Isernia, region of Molise, Italy.

== History ==
The church was erected in 1545 by the Confraternity of the Eucharist for the ill, a group that sponsored a local hospice. Hoping to avoid the disease, they had abandoned the Venafro Cathedral during the plague to this then more rural location in the parish of San Giovanni De Graecis,

In 1650, the building was refurbished and enlarged, and the old church became merely the presbytery and sacristy. The entrance and facade were given a scenic entrance with stairs and balustrade. The church was reconsecrated in 1790 and once held the silver reliquary with the head of San Nicandro.

The interiors have a single nave, decorated in Baroque style.
