= Nicolas Solimele =

Most Reverend Nicolas Solimele
- Bishop of Venosa
- Church: Catholic Church
- Diocese: Diocese of Venosa
- In office: 1459–1492
- Successor: Sigismondo Pappacoda
- Previous post: Bishop of Acerno (1436–1459)

Personal details
- Died: 1492 Venosa, Italy

Nicolas Solimele (died 1492) was a Roman Catholic prelate who served as Bishop of Venosa (1459–1492) and Bishop of Acerno (1436–1459).

== Biography ==
On 7 August 1436, Nicolas Solimele was appointed by Pope Eugene IV as Bishop of Acerno.

On 17 October 1459, he was transferred by Pope Pius II to the diocese of Venosa. He served as Bishop of Venosa until his death in 1492.

While bishop, he was the principal consecrator of Carlo Setari, Bishop of Isernia (1470); and the co-consecrator of João Manuel, Bishop of Ceuta (1444).

== External links and additional sources ==
- Cheney, David M. "Diocese of Acerno". Catholic-Hierarchy.org. (for Chronology of Bishops) ^{[self-published]}

Catholic Church titles
Preceded by	Bishop of Acerno; 1436–1459	Succeeded by Paracleto Malvezzi
Preceded by	Bishop of Venosa; 1459–1492	Succeeded by Sigismondo Pappacoda
