= Diego Merino =

Diego Merino may refer to:

- Diego Merino (bishop) (1570–1637), Spanish Catholic prelate
- Diego Merino (footballer) (born 1988), Spanish football manager and former player
