= Paolo Sperduti =

Italian painter

Paolo Sperduti (1725–1799) was an Italian painter, active in Southern Italy and Rome.

He was born in either Venafro or Arpino, but Sperduti travelled to Rome and studied under Agostino Masucci. In 1758–1759, he was commissioned to paint the ceiling and choir of the church of the Annunziata in Venafro.
