= Cristoforo Memmolo =

Roman Catholic prelate (1586–1646)

Most Reverend Cristoforo Memmolo
- Bishop of Ruvo
- Church: Catholic Church
- Diocese: Diocese of Ruvo
- In office: 1621–1646
- Predecessor: Giuseppe Saluzzo
- Successor: Marco Romano (bishop)

Orders
- Consecration: 18 April 1621 by Giovanni Garzia Mellini

Personal details
- Born: 1586 Benevento, Italy
- Died: May 1646 (age 60) Ruvo, Italy

Bishop Cristoforo Memmolo, C.R. (1586 – 1646) was a Roman Catholic prelate who served as Bishop of Ruvo (1621–1646).

== Biography ==
Cristoforo Memmolo was born in Benevento, Italy in 1586 and ordained a priest in the Congregation of Clerics Regular of the Divine Providence. On 29 March 1621, he was appointed during the papacy of Pope Paul V as Bishop of Ruvo. On 18 April 1621, he was consecrated bishop by Giovanni Garzia Mellini, Cardinal-Priest of Santi Quattro Coronati with Attilio Amalteo, Titular Archbishop of Athenae, and Paolo De Curtis, Bishop Emeritus of Isernia, serving as co-consecrators. He served as Bishop of Ruvo until his death in May 1646.

== External links and additional sources ==
- Cheney, David M. "Diocese of Ruvo". Catholic-Hierarchy.org. (for Chronology of Bishops) ^{[self-published]}
- Chow, Gabriel. "Diocese of Ruvo (Italy)". GCatholic.org. (for Chronology of Bishops) ^{[self-published]}

Catholic Church titles
Preceded by Giuseppe Saluzzo	Bishop of Ruvo; 1621–1646	Succeeded by Marco Romano (bishop)
