= Cappella San Donato, Venafro =

Roman Catholic church in Venafro, Italy

The Cappella San Donato is a small Roman Catholic church or oratory erected in 1500 in the town of Venafro, province of Isernia, region of Molise, Italy within the Diocese of Isernia-Venafro.

It was a site for morning prayers for the porcari (swineherds), before they went out into the fields. It was closed during 1920–1942. Damaged during the war, it has not been re-opened.

== See also ==
- Catholic Church in Italy
