= Tommaso Ximenes =

Italian Roman Catholic prelate

Most Reverend Tommaso Ximenes
- Bishop of Fiesole
- Church: Catholic Church
- Diocese: Diocese of Fiesole
- In office: 1620–1633
- Predecessor: Baccio Gherardini
- Successor: Lorenzo della Robbia

Orders
- Consecration: 22 November 1620 by Giovanni Garzia Mellini

Personal details
- Died: 3 November 1633 Fiesole, Italy

Tommaso Ximenes (died 3 November 1633) was a Roman Catholic prelate who served as Bishop of Fiesole (1620–1633).

== Biography ==
On 16 November 1620, Tommaso Ximenes was appointed during the papacy of Pope Paul V as Bishop of Fiesole. On 22 November 1620, he was consecrated bishop by Giovanni Garzia Mellini, Cardinal-Priest of Santi Quattro Coronati, with Attilio Amalteo, Titular Archbishop of Athenae, and Paolo De Curtis, Bishop Emeritus of Isernia, serving as co-consecrators. He served as Bishop of Fiesole until his death on 3 November 1633.

== Episcopal succession ==
While bishop, he was the principal co-consecrator of:

- Marco Antonio Quirino, Archbishop of Naxos (1622);
- Alexandre della Stufa (Lotteringhi), Bishop of Montepulciano (1623);
- Diego Merino, Bishop of Montepeloso (1623);
- Scipione Tancredi, Bishop of Sovana (1624);
- Michael Masserotti (Misserotti), Bishop of Bitetto (1624); and
- Francesco Nori, Bishop of San Miniato (1624).

Catholic Church titles
| Preceded by Baccio Gherardini | Bishop of Fiesole; 1620–1633 | Succeeded by Lorenzo della Robbia |
