= Antonio Numai =

Italian Roman Catholic prelate

Most Reverend Antonio Numai
- Bishop of Isernia
- Church: Catholic Church
- Diocese: Diocese of Isernia
- In office: 1524–1568
- Predecessor: Cristoforo Numai
- Successor: Giovanni Battista Lomellino

Personal details
- Died: 1568 Isernia, Italy

Antonio Numai (died 1568) was a Roman Catholic prelate who served as Bishop of Isernia (1524–1567).

== Biography ==
On 19 December 1524, Antonio Numai was appointed during the papacy of Pope Clement VII as Bishop of Isernia. He served as Bishop of Isernia until his resignation in 1567. He died in 1568.

While bishop, he was the principal co-consecrator of Evangelista Cittadini, Bishop of Alessano (1544); and Giulio Giovio, Bishop of Nocera de' Pagani (1553).

== External links and additional sources ==
- Cheney, David M. "Diocese of Isernia-Venafro". Catholic-Hierarchy.org. (for Chronology of Bishops) ^{[self-published]}
- Chow, Gabriel. "Diocese of Isernia-Venafro (Italy)". GCatholic.org. (for Chronology of Bishops) ^{[self-published]}

Catholic Church titles
Preceded by Cristoforo Numai	Bishop of Isernia; 1524–1567	Succeeded by Giovanni Battista Lomellino
