= Santi Martino e Nicola, Venafro =

Church in Venafro, Italy

Santi Martino e Nicola is a Roman Catholic church in the center of the town of Venafro, province of Isernia, region of Molise, Italy.

== History ==
A church on the site was built circa 1200 using spoil from prior temples. Lateal to the portal are two niches, where there are figures representing the Saints Martino and Nicola. Damage received during November 1943 causes the church to be closed.
