= Giovanni Battista Malaspina =

17th-century Roman Catholic bishop

Most Reverend Giovanni Battista Malaspina
- Bishop of Massa Marittima
- Church: Catholic Church
- Diocese: Diocese of Massa Marittima
- In office: 1629–1655
- Predecessor: Fabio Piccolomini
- Successor: Bandino Accarigi

Orders
- Consecration: 13 Dec 1629 by Carlo Emmanuele Pio di Savoia

Personal details
- Born: 1589
- Died: 16 Oct 1655 (age 66)

Giovanni Battista Malaspina (1589–1655) was a Roman Catholic prelate who served as Bishop of Massa Marittima (1629–1655).

== Biography ==
Giovanni Battista Malaspina was born in 1589. On 13 Dec 1629, he was appointed during the papacy of Pope Urban VIII as Bishop of Massa Marittima. On 13 Dec 1629, he was consecrated bishop by Carlo Emmanuele Pio di Savoia, Cardinal-Bishop of Albano, with Alessandro Filonardi, Bishop of Aquino, and Ranuccio Scotti Douglas, Bishop of Borgo San Donnino, serving as co-consecrators. He served as Bishop of Massa Marittima until his death on 16 Oct 1655.

== External links and additional sources ==
- Cheney, David M. "Diocese of Massa Marittima-Piombino". Catholic-Hierarchy.org. (for Chronology of Bishops) ^{[self-published]}
- Chow, Gabriel. "Diocese of Massa Marittima-Piombino (Italy)". GCatholic.org. (for Chronology of Bishops) ^{[self-published]}

Catholic Church titles
Preceded by Fabio Piccolomini	Bishop of Massa Marittima; 1629–1655	Succeeded by Bandino Accarigi
