= Gerolamo Mascambruno =

17th-century Roman Catholic bishop

Most Reverend Gerolamo Mascambruno
- Bishop of Isernia
- Church: Catholic Church
- Diocese: Diocese of Isernia
- In office: 1642–1643
- Predecessor: Marcello Stella
- Successor: Pietro Paolo de' Rustici

Orders
- Ordination: 29 Jun 1642
- Consecration: 24 Aug 1642 by Vincenzo Maculani

Personal details
- Born: 1597 Benevento, Italy
- Died: May 1643 (age 46)

Gerolamo Mascambruno (1597–1643) was a Roman Catholic prelate who served as Bishop of Isernia (1642–1643).

== Biography ==
Gerolamo Mascambruno was born in 1597 in Benevento, Italy and ordained a priest on 29 Jun 1642. On 11 Aug 1642, he was appointed during the papacy of Pope Urban VIII as Bishop of Isernia. On 24 Aug 1642, he was consecrated bishop by Vincenzo Maculani, Archbishop of Benevento, with Alessandro Filonardi, Bishop of Aquino, and Maurizio Solaro di Moretta, Bishop of Mondovi, serving as co-consecrators. He served as Bishop of Isernia until his death in May 1643.

== External links and additional sources ==
- Cheney, David M. "Diocese of Isernia-Venafro". Catholic-Hierarchy.org. (for Chronology of Bishops) ^{[self-published]}
- Chow, Gabriel. "Diocese of Isernia-Venafro (Italy)". GCatholic.org. (for Chronology of Bishops) ^{[self-published]}

Catholic Church titles
Preceded by Marcello Stella	Bishop of Isernia; 1642–1643	Succeeded by Pietro Paolo de' Rustici
