= Carlo Setari =

15th-century Roman Catholic bishop

Most Reverend Carlo Setari
- Bishop of Isernia
- Church: Catholic Church
- In office: 1470–1486
- Successor: Francesco de Adamo Lucharo

Orders
- Consecration: 3 June 1470 by Nicolas Solimele

Personal details
- Died: 1486

Carlo Setari (died 1486) was a Roman Catholic prelate who served as the Bishop of Isernia (1470–1486).

== Biography ==
On 12 January 1470, Carlo Setari was appointed Bishop of Isernia by Pope Paul II. On 3 June 1470, he was consecrated bishop by Nicolas Solimele, Bishop of Venosa, with Meolo de Mascabruni, Bishop of Muro Lucano, and Giovanni Geraldini, Bishop of Catanzaro, serving as co-consecrators. He served as Bishop of Isernia until his death in 1486.

== Sources ==
- Eubel, Konrad (1914). Hierarchia catholica medii et recentioris aevi (in Latin). Vol. II (second ed.). Münster: Libreria Regensbergiana. p. 169.

Catholic Church titles
Preceded by	Bishop of Isernia; 1470–1486	Succeeded by Francesco de Adamo de Lucharo
