= Alessio Geromoaddi =

Italian Roman Catholic prelate

Most Reverend Alessio Geromoaddi
- Bishop of Isernia
- Church: Catholic Church
- Diocese: Diocese of Isernia
- In office: 1606–1611
- Predecessor: Paolo De Curtis
- Successor: Marcantonio Genovesi

Personal details
- Born: 1545 Terni, Italy
- Died: 6 April 1611 (age 66) Isernia, Italy

Alessio Geromoaddi (died 1611) was a Roman Catholic prelate who served as Bishop of Isernia (1606–1611).

== Biography ==
Alessio Geromoaddi was born in Terni, Italy in 1545. On 24 April 1606, he was appointed during the papacy of Pope Paul V as Bishop of Isernia. He served as Bishop of Isernia until his death on 6 April 1611.

== External links and additional sources ==
- Cheney, David M. "Diocese of Isernia-Venafro". Catholic-Hierarchy.org. (for Chronology of Bishops) ^{[self-published]}
- Chow, Gabriel. "Diocese of Isernia-Venafro (Italy)". GCatholic.org. (for Chronology of Bishops) ^{[self-published]}

Catholic Church titles
Preceded by Paolo De Curtis	Bishop of Isernia; 1606–1611	Succeeded by Marcantonio Genovesi
