= Gian Gerolamo Campanili =

Italian Roman Catholic prelate

Most Reverend Gian Gerolamo Campanili
- Bishop of Isernia
- Church: Catholic Church
- Diocese: Diocese of Isernia
- In office: 1608–1625
- Predecessor: Marcantonio Genovesi
- Successor: Diego Merino
- Previous post: Bishop of Lacedonia (1625–1626)

Personal details
- Born: Naples, Italy
- Died: 22 June 1626 Isernia, Italy

Gian Gerolamo Campanili (died 22 June 1626) was a Roman Catholic prelate who served as Bishop of Isernia (1608–1625) and Bishop of Lacedonia (1625–1626).

== Biography ==
Gian Gerolamo Campanili was born in Naples, Italy. On 24 December 1608, he was appointed during the papacy of Pope Paul V as Bishop of Lacedonia. On 27 January 1625, he was appointed during the papacy of Pope Urban VIII as Bishop of Isernia. He served as Bishop of Isernia until his death on 22 June 1626.

While bishop, he was the principal consecrator of Alessandro Bosco, Bishop of Carinola (1619).

== External links and additional sources ==
- Cheney, David M. "Diocese of Isernia-Venafro". Catholic-Hierarchy.org. (for Chronology of Bishops) ^{[self-published]}
- Chow, Gabriel. "Diocese of Isernia-Venafro (Italy)". GCatholic.org. (for Chronology of Bishops) ^{[self-published]}
- Cheney, David M. "Diocese of Lacedonia". Catholic-Hierarchy.org. (for Chronology of Bishops) ^{[self-published]}
- Chow, Gabriel. "Diocese of Lacedonia (Italy)". GCatholic.org. (for Chronology of Bishops) ^{[self-published]}

Catholic Church titles
Preceded by Giacomo Candido	Bishop of Lacedonia; 1608–1625	Succeeded by Ferdinando Bruno
Preceded by Marcantonio Genovesi	Bishop of Isernia; 1625–1626	Succeeded by Diego Merino
