= Giovanni Battista Lomellino =

Italian Roman Catholic prelate

Most Reverend Giovanni Battista Lomellino
- Bishop of Isernia
- Church: Catholic Church
- Diocese: Diocese of Isernia
- In office: 1567–1599
- Predecessor: Antonio Numai
- Successor: Paolo De Curtis
- Previous post: Bishop of Guardialfiera (1562–1567)

Personal details
- Died: 22 November 1599 Isernia, Italy

Giovanni Battista Lomellino (died 1599) was a Roman Catholic prelate who served as Bishop of Isernia (1567–1599) and Bishop of Guardialfiera (1562–1567).

== Biography ==
On 17 April 1562, Giovanni Battista Lomellino was appointed during the papacy of Pope Pius IV as Bishop of Guardialfiera. On 17 March 1567, he was appointed during the papacy of Pope Pius V as Bishop of Isernia.) He served as Bishop of Isernia until his death on 22 November 1599.

== External links and additional sources ==
- Cheney, David M. "Diocese of Guardialfiera (Guardia)". Catholic-Hierarchy.org. (for Chronology of Bishops) ^{[self-published]}
- Chow, Gabriel. "Titular Episcopal See of Guardialfiera (Italy)". GCatholic.org. (for Chronology of Bishops) ^{[self-published]}
- Cheney, David M. "Diocese of Isernia-Venafro". Catholic-Hierarchy.org. (for Chronology of Bishops) ^{[self-published]}
- Chow, Gabriel. "Diocese of Isernia-Venafro (Italy)". GCatholic.org. (for Chronology of Bishops) ^{[self-published]}

Catholic Church titles
Preceded by Giacomo Lomellino del Canto	Bishop of Guardialfiera; 1562–1567	Succeeded by Carlo Carafa (bishop)
Preceded by Antonio Numai	Bishop of Isernia; 1567–1599	Succeeded by Paolo De Curtis
