= Marcantonio Genovesi =

Catholic bishop

Most Reverend Marcantonio Genovesi
- Bishop of Isernia
- Church: Catholic Church
- Diocese: Diocese of Isernia
- In office: 1611–1624
- Predecessor: Alessio Geromoaddi
- Successor: Gian Gerolamo Campanili
- Previous post: Bishop of Montemarano (1603–1611)

Orders
- Consecration: 11 May 1603 by Mariano Pierbenedetti

Personal details
- Died: 7 November 1624 Isernia, Italy

Marcantonio Genovesi (died 7 November 1624) was a Roman Catholic prelate who served as Bishop of Isernia (1611–1624) and Bishop of Montemarano (1603–1611).

== Biography ==
On 9 May 1603, Marcantonio Genovesi was appointed during the papacy of Pope Clement VIII as Bishop of Montemarano. On 11 May 1603, he was consecrated bishop by Mariano Pierbenedetti, Cardinal-Priest of Santi Marcellino e Pietro. On 26 September 1611, he was appointed during the papacy of Pope Paul V as Bishop of Isernia. He served as Bishop of Isernia until his death on 7 November 1624.

While bishop, he was the principal co-consecrator of François-Etienne Dulci, Archbishop of Avignon (1609); and Gregorius Pedrocca, Bishop of Acqui (1620).

== External links and additional sources ==
- Cheney, David M. "Diocese of Isernia-Venafro". Catholic-Hierarchy.org. (for Chronology of Bishops) ^{[self-published]}
- Chow, Gabriel. "Diocese of Isernia-Venafro (Italy)". GCatholic.org. (for Chronology of Bishops) ^{[self-published]}

Catholic Church titles
Preceded by Silvestro Branconi	Bishop of Montemarano; 1603–1611	Succeeded by Eleuterio Albergone
Preceded by Alessio Geromoaddi	Bishop of Isernia; 1611–1624	Succeeded by Gian Gerolamo Campanili
