= Theodor Riphaen =

German Roman Catholic prelate

Most Reverend Theodor Riphaen
- Auxiliary Bishop of Cologne; Titular Bishop of Cyrene
- Church: Catholic Church
- Archdiocese: Archdiocese of Cologne
- In office: 1606–1616

Orders
- Consecration: 3 March 1607 by Attilio Amalteo

Personal details
- Born: 1577 Neuss, Electorate of Cologne
- Died: 14 January 1616 (aged 38–39) Cologne, Electorate of Cologne

Theodor Riphaen or Theodor Riphan (1577 – 14 January 1616) was a Roman Catholic prelate who served as Auxiliary Bishop of Cologne (1606–1616).

== Biography ==
Theodor Riphaen was born in Neuss, Germany in 1577. On 30 August 1606, he was appointed during the papacy of Pope Paul V as Auxiliary Bishop of Cologne and Titular Bishop of Cyrene. On 3 March 1607, he was consecrated bishop by Attilio Amalteo, Titular Archbishop of Athenae. He served as Auxiliary Bishop of Cologne until his death on 14 January 1616.

== External links and additional sources ==
- Cheney, David M. "Cyrene (Titular See)". Catholic-Hierarchy.org. (for Chronology of Bishops) ^{[self-published]}
- Chow, Gabriel. "Titular Episcopal See of Cyrene (Libya)". GCatholic.org. (for Chronology of Bishops) ^{[self-published]}
- Cheney, David M. "Archdiocese of Köln {Cologne}". Catholic-Hierarchy.org. (for Chronology of Bishops) ^{[self-published]}
- Chow, Gabriel. "Metropolitan Archdiocese of Köln (Germany)". GCatholic.org. (for Chronology of Bishops) ^{[self-published]}
