= Basilica of San Nicandro, Venafro =

Coordinates: 41°29′23″N 14°03′36″E

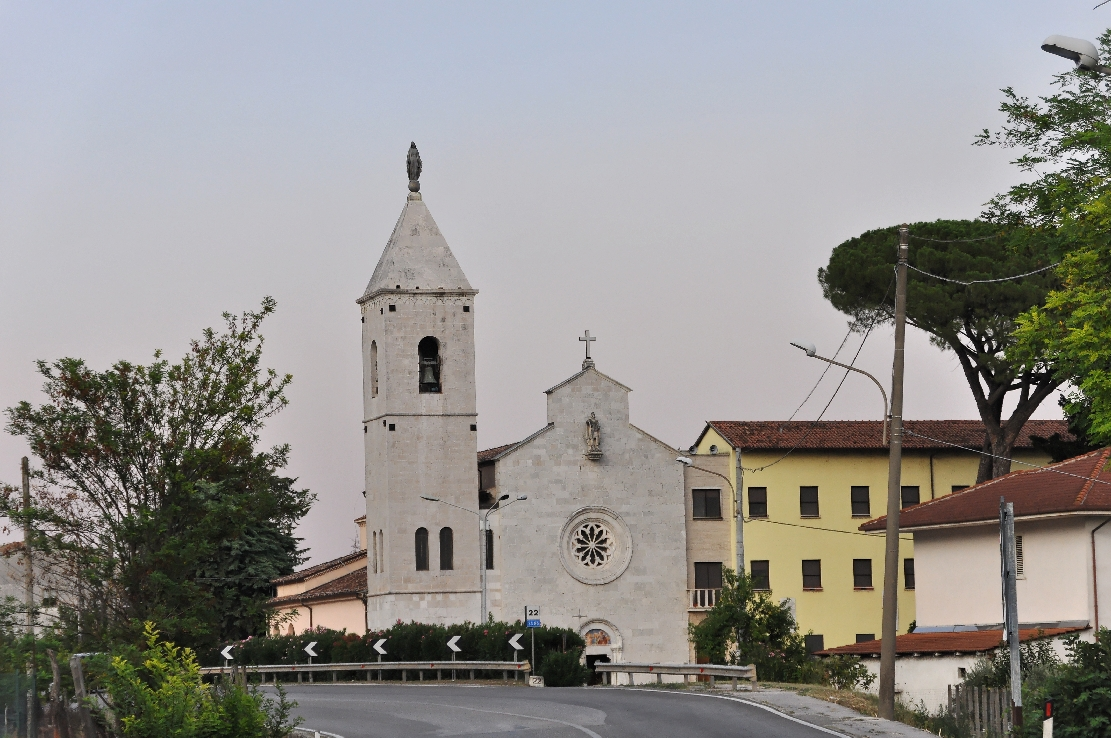

The Basilica of San Nicandro is a medieval Roman Catholic church in town of Venafro, in the Region of Molise.

== History ==
The church of San Nicandro was supposedly founded in the tenth century when the relics of the saint were discovered. The present church dates to the 13th century with rustic stone façade with a rose window in Romanesque style. The façade was reconstructed in the 1500s, along with an adjacent convent. The present belltower was built in 1949.

The church was assigned to Basilian order, until the order was abolished by Pope Sixtus V in 1554. For some years the church was abandoned, but in 1573, it was assigned to the Capuchin order. The convent was suppressed in 1811, although the order returned in 1816, and were custodians until the church was passed to the Commune by 1867. In 1870, the convent passed on the Franciscan order.

The interior decoration in stucco was completed in the late 19th century. The lateral nave has a wooden painted crucifix dating to the late 14th century. The main altarpiece depicts a Virgin, child and Saints Francis, Nicandro and Marciano by Teodoro d'Errico. In the crypt below the altar are the rests of San Nicandro. The legend holds that every year the tomb oozes a miraculous liquid called Manna of San Nicandro.
