= Massimo Bruni Corvino =

Italian Roman Catholic prelate

Most Reverend Massimo Bruni Corvino
- Bishop of Isernia
- Church: Catholic Church
- Diocese: Diocese of Isernia
- In office: 1510–1522
- Predecessor: Giovanni Olivieri
- Successor: Cristoforo Numai

Personal details
- Died: 1522 Isernia, Italy

Massimo Bruni Corvino (died 1522) was a Roman Catholic prelate who served as Bishop of Isernia (1510–1522).

== Biography ==
On 30 September 1510, Massimo Bruni Corvino was appointed during the papacy of Pope Julius II as Bishop of Isernia. He served as Bishop of Isernia until his death in 1522.

== External links and additional sources ==
- Cheney, David M. "Diocese of Isernia-Venafro". Catholic-Hierarchy.org. (for Chronology of Bishops) ^{[self-published]}
- Chow, Gabriel. "Diocese of Isernia-Venafro (Italy)". GCatholic.org. (for Chronology of Bishops) ^{[self-published]}

Catholic Church titles
Preceded by Giovanni Olivieri	Bishop of Isernia; 1510–1522	Succeeded by Cristoforo Numai
