= Francesco Adami =

15th-century Roman Catholic bishop

Most Reverend Francesco Adami
- Bishop of Isernia
- Church: Catholic Church
- In office: 1486–1497
- Predecessor: Carlo Setari
- Successor: Costantino Castriota

Personal details
- Born: 1457
- Died: 1497 (age 40)

Francesco Adami or Francesco de Adamo de Lucharo (1457–1497) was a Roman Catholic prelate who served as Bishop of Isernia (1486–1497).

== Biography ==
Francesco Adami was born in 1457. On 10 Apr 1486, he was appointed during the papacy of Pope Innocent VIII as Bishop of Isernia. He served as Bishop of Isernia until his death in 1497.

== External links and additional sources ==
- Cheney, David M. "Diocese of Isernia-Venafro". Catholic-Hierarchy.org. (for Chronology of Bishops) ^{[self-published]}
- Chow, Gabriel. "Diocese of Isernia-Venafro (Italy)". GCatholic.org. (for Chronology of Bishops) ^{[self-published]}

Catholic Church titles
| Preceded by Carlo Setari | Bishop of Isernia; 1486–1497 | Succeeded by Costantino Castriota |
