= Andrea Gemma =

Italian Roman Catholic bishop (1931–2019)

Andrea Gemma (7 June 1931 – 2 September 2019) was an Italian Roman Catholic bishop.

Gemma was born in Italy and was ordained to the priesthood in 1957. He served as bishop of the Roman Catholic Diocese of Isernia-Venafro, Italy, from 1991 until 2006. Gemma was a prominent exorcist, which is highly unusual for a bishop. He wrote "Confidenze di un esorcista", published by Villadiseriane in 2009.
