= Francesco Berardino Corradini =

Most Reverend Francesco Berardino Corradini
- Bishop of Marsi
- Church: Catholic Church
- Diocese: Diocese of Marsi
- In office: 1680–1718
- Predecessor: Diego Petra
- Successor: Muzio de' Vecchi

Orders
- Consecration: 2 June 1680 by Gasparo Carpegna

Personal details
- Born: 1635 Fabriano, Italy
- Died: 26 December 1718 (age 89) Marsi, Italy

Francesco Berardino Corradini (1635 – 26 December 1718) was a Roman Catholic prelate who was Bishop of Marsi (1680–1718).

== Biography ==
Francesco Berardino Corradini was born in Fabriano, Italy, in 1635. On 27 May 1680, he was appointed during the papacy of Pope Innocent XI as Bishop of Marsi. On 2 June 1680, he was consecrated bishop by Gasparo Carpegna, Cardinal-Priest of San Silvestro in Capite, with Giacomo Altoviti, Titular Patriarch of Antioch, and Odoardo Cibo, Titular Archbishop of Seleucia in Isauria as co-consecrators. He served as Bishop of Marsi until his death on 26 December 1718.

== External links and additional sources ==
- Cheney, David M. "Diocese of Avezzano". Catholic-Hierarchy.org. (for Chronology of Bishops)
- Chow, Gabriel. "Diocese of Avezzano (Italy)". GCatholic.org. (for Chronology of Bishops)

Catholic Church titles
Preceded by Diego Petra	Bishop of Marsi; 1680–1718	Succeeded by Muzio de' Vecchi
