= François-Etienne Dulci =

Most Reverend François-Etienne Dulci
- Archbishop of Avignon
- Church: Catholic Church
- Archdiocese: Archdiocese of Avignon
- In office: 1609–1624
- Predecessor: Jean-François Bordini
- Successor: Mario Filonardi

Orders
- Consecration: 26 April 1609 by Girolamo Bernerio

Personal details
- Died: 23 June 1624 Avignon, France

François-Etienne Dulci, O.P. (died 23 June 1624) was a Roman Catholic prelate who served as Archbishop of Avignon (1609–1624).

== Biography ==
François-Etienne Dulci was ordained a priest in the Order of Preachers. On 6 April 1609, he was appointed during the papacy of Pope Paul V as Archbishop of Avignon. On 26 April 1609, he was consecrated bishop by Girolamo Bernerio, Cardinal-Bishop of Porto e Santa Rufina, with Giovanni Battista del Tufo, Bishop Emeritus of Acerra, and Marcantonio Genovesi, Bishop of Montemarano, serving as co-consecrators. He was officially installed sometime in 2010. He served as Archbishop of Avignon until his death on 23 June 1624.

Catholic Church titles
Preceded by Jean-François Bordini	Archbishop of Avignon; 1609–1624	Succeeded by Mario Filonardi
