= Domenico Giordani =

Italian Roman Catholic prelate

Most Reverend Domenico Giordani
- Church: Catholic Church
- Diocese: Diocese of Isernia
- In office: 1637–1640
- Predecessor: Diego Merino
- Successor: Marcello Stella

Orders
- Consecration: 20 September 1637 by Francesco Maria Brancaccio

Personal details
- Born: Naples, Italy
- Died: 11 February 1640 Rome

Domenico Giordani, O.F.M. Obs. (died 11 February 1640) was a Roman Catholic prelate who served as Bishop of Isernia (1637–1640).

== Biography ==
Domenico Giordani was born in Naples, Italy and ordained a priest in the Order of Observant Friars Minor. On 17 August 1637, he was appointed during the papacy of Pope Urban VIII as Bishop of Isernia. On 20 September 1637, he was consecrated bishop by Francesco Maria Brancaccio, Cardinal-Priest of Santi XII Apostoli, with Gaetano Cossa, Archbishop of Otranto, and Tommaso Carafa, Bishop Emeritus of Vulturara e Montecorvino, serving as co-consecrators. He served as Bishop of Isernia until his death on 11 February 1640.

== External links and additional sources ==
- Cheney, David M. "Diocese of Isernia-Venafro". Catholic-Hierarchy.org. (for Chronology of Bishops) ^{[self-published]}
- Chow, Gabriel. "Diocese of Isernia-Venafro (Italy)". GCatholic.org. (for Chronology of Bishops) ^{[self-published]}

Catholic Church titles
Preceded by Diego Merino	Bishop of Isernia; 1637–1640	Succeeded by Marcello Stella
