= Attilio Amalteo =

Italian Roman Catholic prelate

Most Reverend Attilio Amalteo
- Titular Archbishop of Athenae
- Church: Catholic Church
- In office: 1606–1633
- Previous post: Apostolic Nuncio to Germany (1606–1610)

Personal details
- Born: 1545
- Died: 25 May 1633 (age 88)

Attilio Amalteo (1545–1633) was a Roman Catholic prelate who served as Apostolic Nuncio to Germany (1606–1610) and Titular Archbishop of Athenae (1606–1633).

== Biography ==
Attilio Amalteo was born in 1545. On 14 August 1606, he was appointed during the papacy of Pope Paul V as Titular Archbishop of Athenae. On 1 September 1606, he was appointed during the papacy of Pope Paul V as Apostolic Nuncio to Germany. He served as Apostolic Nuncio to Germany until his resignation on 26 April 1610. He died on 25 May 1633.

== Episcopal succession ==
Episcopal succession of Attilio Amalteo

While bishop, he was the principal consecrator of:

- Theodor Riphaen, Auxiliary Bishop of Köln and Titular Bishop of Cyrene (1607);
- Eitel Friedrich von Hohenzollern-Sigmaringen, Bishop of Osnabrück (1623);

and the principal co-consecrator of:

- Giulio Masi, Bishop of Giovinazzo (1611);
- Giulio Mattei, Bishop of Bitetto (1611);
- Pietro Emo, Coadjutor Bishop of Crema and Titular Bishop of Larissa in Syria (1612);
- Antonius de Pozega (Poseca), Bishop of Scardona (1613);
- Franciscus Boncianni, Archbishop of Pisa (1613);
- Gian Alberto Garzoni, Bishop of Canea (1614);
- Baccio Gherardini, Bishop of Fiesole (1615);
- Vitalis de L'Estang, Coadjutor Bishop of Carcassonne and Titular Bishop of Ephesus (1615);
- Pietro Paolo Miloto, Bishop of Chioggia (1615);
- Adam Nowodworski, Bishop of Kamyanets-Podilskyi (1615);
- Vincenzo Caputo, Bishop of San Severo (1615);
- Matteo Sanudo, Coadjutor Bishop of Concordia and Titular Bishop of Ioppe (1615);
- Giovanni Sanctatus, Bishop of Rethymo (1616);
- Giuseppe Delfino (bishop), Coadjutor Bishop of Vicenza and Titular Bishop of Paphus (1616);
- Lorenzo Castrucci, Bishop of Spoleto (1617);
- Petrus Pitarca, Bishop of Termia (1617);
- Pasquale Grassi, Bishop of Chioggia (1619);
- Eusebius Caimus, Bishop of Novigrad (1620);
- Paolo Arese, Bishop of Tortona (1620);
- Germanicus Mantica, Titular Bishop of Famagusta (1620);
- Tommaso Ximenes, Bishop of Fiesole (1620);
- Silvestro Andreozzi, Bishop of Penne e Atri (1621);
- Cristoforo Memmolo, Bishop of Ruvo (1621);
- Agostino Morosini, Titular Archbishop of Damascus (1621);
- Theodorus Georgi, Bishop of Arbe (1621);
- Antonio Bonfiglioli, Bishop of Carinola (1622);
- Felice Siliceo, Bishop of Troia (1623);
- Michael Masserotti (Misserotti), Bishop of Bitetto (1624);
- Alderano Bellati (Bellatto), Bishop of Bisignano (1624);
- Angelus Maria Cittadini, Coadjutor Archbishop of Nachitschewan and Titular Archbishop of Myra (1624);
- Mario Filonardi, Archbishop of Avignon (1624); and
- Henri de Sponde, Bishop of Pamiers (1626).

Catholic Church titles
Preceded by	Titular Archbishop of Athenae; 1606–1633	Succeeded by
Preceded by Coriolani Garzadori	Apostolic Nuncio to Germany; 1606–1610	Succeeded by Antonio Albergati
