= Paolo De Curtis =

Italian Roman Catholic prelate

Most Reverend Paolo De Curtis
- Bishop Emeritus of Isernia
- Church: Catholic Church
- Diocese: Diocese of Isernia
- In office: 1600–1606
- Predecessor: Giovanni Battista Lomellino
- Successor: Alessio Geromoaddi

Personal details
- Died: 1629 Rome, Italy

Paolo De Curtis, C.R. (died 1629) was a Roman Catholic prelate who served as Bishop of Isernia (1600–1606) and Bishop of Ravello (1591–1600).

== Biography ==
Paolo De Curtis was ordained a priest in the Congregation of Clerics Regular of the Divine Providence. On 26 April 1591, he was appointed during the papacy of Pope Gregory XIV as Bishop of Ravello. On 15 March 1600, he was appointed during the papacy of Pope Clement VIII as Bishop of Isernia. He served as Bishop of Isernia until his resignation in 1606. He died in 1629 in Rome, Italy.

== Episcopal succession ==
While bishop, he was the principal co-consecrator of:

- Fabrizio Degli Afflitti, Bishop of Boiano (1608);
- Girolamo Asteo, Bishop of Veroli (1608);
- Michael Consoli, Bishop of Sora (1609);
- Giovanni Antonio Angrisani, Archbishop of Sorrento (1612);
- Lorenzo Landi, Bishop of Fossombrone (1612);
- Alessandro Filonardi, Bishop of Aquino (1615);
- Paolo Emilio Filonardi, Archbishop of Amalfi (1616);
- Achille Caracciolo, Bishop of Potenza (1616);
- Stephanus Penulatius, Bishop of Rethymo (1617);
- Andrea Mastrillo, Archbishop of Messina (1618);
- Francisco Romero (bishop), Archbishop of Lanciano (1618);
- Zaccaria della Vecchia, Bishop of Torcello (1618);
- Stefano Solis Castelblanco, Bishop of Sarno (1618);
- Giambattista Dal Mare, Bishop of Lavello (1618);
- Marsilio Peruzzi, Archbishop of Chieti (1618);
- Giovanni Agostino Gandolfo, Bishop of Fondi (1619);
- Alessandro Suardi, Bishop of Lucera (1619);
- Jerónimo Venero Leyva, Archbishop of Monreale (1620);
- Francesco Maria della Marra, Bishop of Ascoli Satriano (1620);
- Paolo Arese, Bishop of Tortona (1620);
- Germanicus Mantica, Titular Bishop of Famagusta (1620);
- Tommaso Ximenes, Bishop of Fiesole (1620);
- Silvestro Andreozzi, Bishop of Penne e Atri (1621);
- Cristoforo Memmolo, Bishop of Ruvo (1621);
- Bernardo Florio, Bishop of Canea (1621); and
- Paulus Pucciarelli, Bishop of Andros (1621).

== External links and additional sources ==
- Cheney, David M. "Diocese of Ravello e Scala". Catholic-Hierarchy.org. (for Chronology of Bishops) ^{[self-published]}
- Chow, Gabriel. "Titular Episcopal See of Ravello (Italy)". GCatholic.org. (for Chronology of Bishops) ^{[self-published]}
- Cheney, David M. "Diocese of Isernia-Venafro". Catholic-Hierarchy.org. (for Chronology of Bishops) ^{[self-published]}
- Chow, Gabriel. "Diocese of Isernia-Venafro (Italy)". GCatholic.org. (for Chronology of Bishops) ^{[self-published]}

Catholic Church titles
Preceded by Emilio Scataratica	Bishop of Ravello; 1591–1600	Succeeded by Antonio de Franchis
Preceded by Giovanni Battista Lomellino	Bishop of Isernia; 1600–1606	Succeeded by Alessio Geromoaddi

|}
