= Filippo Filonardi =

Italian Catholic cardinal (1582–1622)

His Eminence Filippo Filonardi
- Cardinal-Priest of Santa Maria del Popolo
- Church: Catholic Church
- In office: 1614–1622
- Predecessor: Francesco Mantica
- Successor: Guido Bentivoglio d'Aragona

Orders
- Rank: Cardinal-Priest

Personal details
- Born: 1582 Bauco, Italy
- Died: 29 Sep 1622 (age 40)

Filippo Filonardi (1582–1622) was a Roman Catholic cardinal.

On 28 December 1608, he was consecrated bishop by Michelangelo Tonti, Cardinal-Priest of San Bartolomeo all'Isola, with Metello Bichi, Bishop Emeritus of Sovana, and Valeriano Muti, Bishop of Città di Castello, serving as co-consecrators.

== Episcopal succession ==
Episcopal succession of Filippo Filonardi

While bishop, he was the principal co-consecrator of:

- Girolamo Curlo, Bishop of Ventimiglia (1614);
- Alessandro Filonardi, Bishop of Aquino (1615);
- Paolo Emilio Filonardi, Archbishop of Amalfi (1616);
- Stephanus Penulatius, Bishop of Rethymo (1617);
- Stefano Solis Castelblanco, Bishop of Sarno (1618); and
- Giambattista Dal Mare, Bishop of Lavello (1618).

Catholic Church titles
Preceded by Flaminio Filonardi	Bishop of Aquino; 1608–1615	Succeeded by Alessandro Filonardi
Preceded by Francesco Mantica	Cardinal-Priest of Santa Maria del Popolo; 1614–1622	Succeeded by Guido Bentivoglio d'Aragona
