= Giovanni Olivieri =

16th-century Roman Catholic prelate

Most Reverend Giovanni Olivieri
- Bishop of Isernia
- Church: Catholic Church
- Diocese: Diocese of Isernia
- In office: 1500–1510
- Predecessor: Costantino Castriota detto Scanderbeg
- Successor: Massimo Bruni Corvino

Personal details
- Died: 1510 Isernia, Italy

Giovanni Olivieri (died 1510) was a Roman Catholic prelate who served as Bishop of Isernia (1500–1510).

== Biography ==
On 8 April 1500, Giovanni Olivieri was appointed during the papacy of Pope Alexander VI as Bishop of Isernia. He served as Bishop of Isernia until his death in 1510.

== External links and additional sources ==
- Cheney, David M. "Diocese of Isernia-Venafro". Catholic-Hierarchy.org. (for Chronology of Bishops) ^{[self-published]}
- Chow, Gabriel. "Diocese of Isernia-Venafro (Italy)". GCatholic.org. (for Chronology of Bishops) ^{[self-published]}

Catholic Church titles
Preceded by Costantino Castriota detto Scanderbeg	Bishop of Isernia; 1500–1510	Succeeded by Massimo Bruni Corvino
