= Isernia Cathedral =

Cathedral in Isernia, Italy

Coordinates: 41°35′23.7″N 14°13′36.1″E

Cattedrale di San Pietro Apostolo
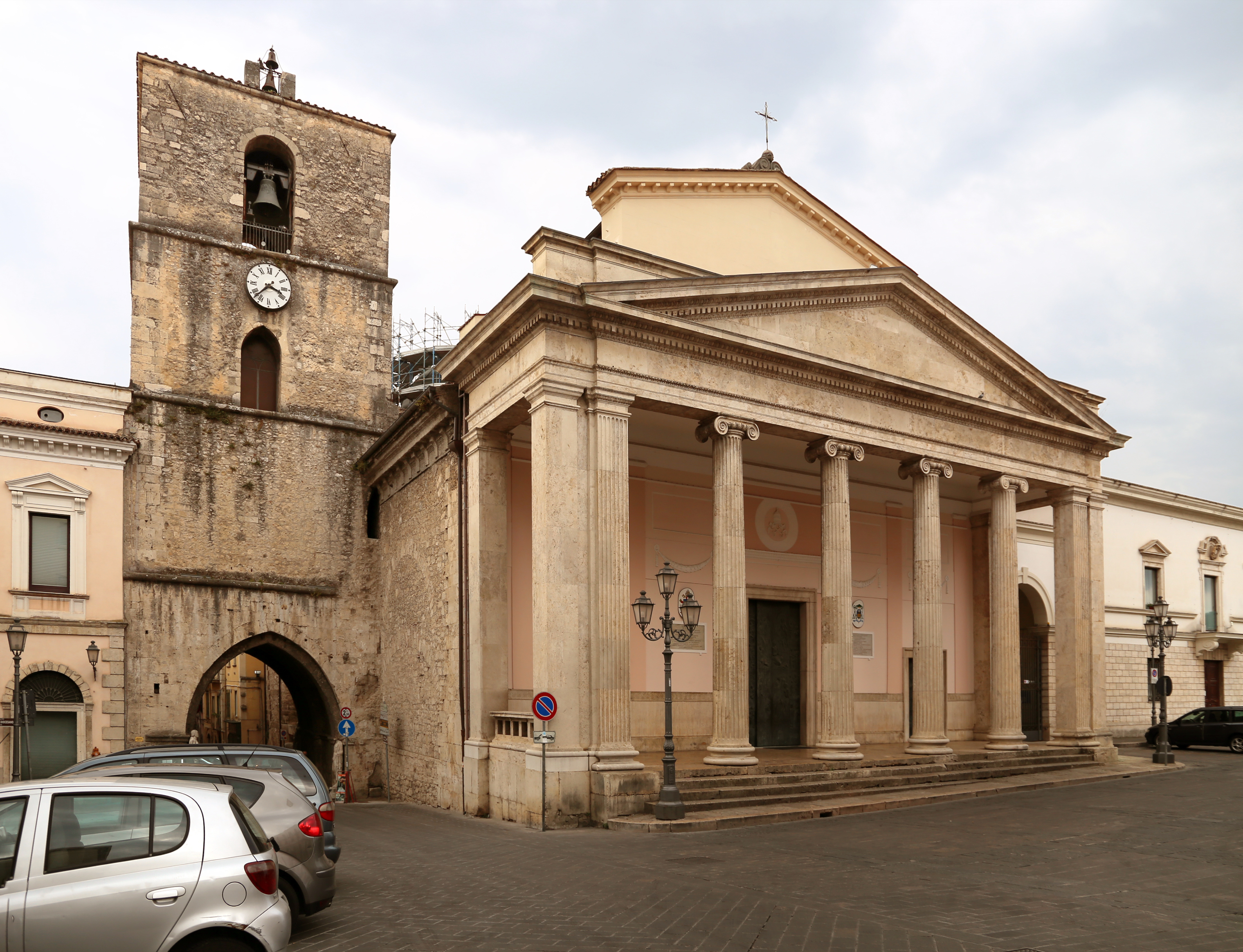
- West front

- Location within Molise Location within Italy

Religion
- Affiliation: Roman Catholic
- Region: Molise

Location
- Location: Isernia Molise
- Interactive map of Cattedrale di San Pietro Apostolo

Architecture
- Type: Church

Isernia Cathedral (Italian: Duomo di Isernia, Cattedrale di San Pietro Apostolo) is a Roman Catholic cathedral in the city of Isernia, Italy, the seat of the Bishop of Isernia-Venafro. It is dedicated to the Apostle Peter. The cathedral is situated in the Piazza Andrea in the old town of Isernia, and stands on the site of an Italic pagan temple of the 3rd century B.C. Construction of the present building began in 1349. Its present appearance is the result of many renovations, occasioned partly by numerous earthquakes and partly by building refurbishments.

== Bibliography ==
- Bandinelli, Ranuccio Bianchi, and Torelli, Mario, 1976: L'arte dell'antichità classica, Etruria-Roma. Torino: Utet
- Catalano, Dora, 2001: Itinerari: La città antica, in: D. Catalano, N. Paone, C. Terzani, Isernia, pp. 97–115. Isernia: Cosmo Iannone Editore
- Damiani, Pasquale, 2003: Palazzi e Chiese della Città di Isernia, pp. 125–131. Venafro: Edizioni Vitmar
