= Muzio Colonna =

Roman Catholic bishop (1596–1632)

Most Reverend Muzio Colonna
- Bishop of Marsi
- Church: Catholic Church
- Diocese: Diocese of Marsi
- In office: 1629–1632
- Predecessor: Baglione Carradoli
- Successor: Lorenzo Massimi

Orders
- Consecration: 13 December 1629 by Carlo Emmanuele Pio di Savoia

Personal details
- Born: 12 Aug 1596 Rome, Italy
- Died: September 5, 1632 (aged 36)

Muzio Colonna (12 August 1596 – 5 September 1632) was a Roman Catholic prelate who served as Bishop of Marsi (1629–1632).

== Biography ==
Colonna was born on 12 August 1596 in Rome, Italy. On 17 September 1629, he was appointed during the papacy of Pope Urban VI as Bishop of Marsi. On 13 December 1629, he was consecrated bishop by Carlo Emmanuele Pio di Savoia, Cardinal-Bishop of Albano, with Alessandro Filonardi, Bishop of Aquino, and Ranuccio Scotti Douglas, Bishop of Borgo San Donnino, serving as co-consecrators. He served as Bishop of Marsi until his death on 5 September 1632.

== External links and additional sources ==
- Cheney, David M. "Diocese of Avezzano". Catholic-Hierarchy.org. (for Chronology of Bishops)
- Chow, Gabriel. "Diocese of Avezzano (Italy)". GCatholic.org. (for Chronology of Bishops)

Catholic Church titles
Preceded by Baglione Carradoli	Bishop of Marsi; 1629–1632	Succeeded by Lorenzo Massimi
