= Marcello Stella =

Italian Roman Catholic prelate

Most Reverend Marcello Stella
- Bishop of Isernia
- Church: Catholic Church
- Diocese: Diocese of Isernia
- Predecessor: Domenico Giordani
- Successor: Gerolamo Mascambruno

Orders
- Ordination: 29 June 1636
- Consecration: 9 April 1640 by Gil Carrillo de Albornoz

Personal details
- Died: 1642 Isernia, Italy

Marcello Stella (died 1642) was a Roman Catholic prelate who served as Bishop of Isernia (1640–1642).

== Biography ==
Marcello Stella was ordained a priest on 29 June 1636. On 26 March 1640, he was appointed during the papacy of Pope Urban VIII as Bishop of Isernia. On 9 April 1640, he was consecrated bishop by Gil Carrillo de Albornoz, Cardinal-Priest of Santa Maria in Via, with Vincenzo Napoli, Bishop of Patti, and Deodato Scaglia, Bishop of Melfi e Rapolla, serving as co-consecrators. He served as Bishop of Isernia until his death in 1642.

== External links and additional sources ==
- Cheney, David M. "Diocese of Isernia-Venafro". Catholic-Hierarchy.org. (for Chronology of Bishops) ^{[self-published]}
- Chow, Gabriel. "Diocese of Isernia-Venafro (Italy)". GCatholic.org. (for Chronology of Bishops) ^{[self-published]}

Catholic Church titles
Preceded by Domenico Giordani	Bishop of Isernia; 1640–1642	Succeeded by Gerolamo Mascambruno
