= Annunziata, Venafro =

Roman Catholic church in Venafro, Italy

Coordinates: 41°29′12.07″N 14°2′40.13″E

The Annunziata (Church of the Virgin of the Annunciation) is a Baroque-style, Roman Catholic church located in a central part of the town of Venafro, province of Isernia, region of Molise, Italy.

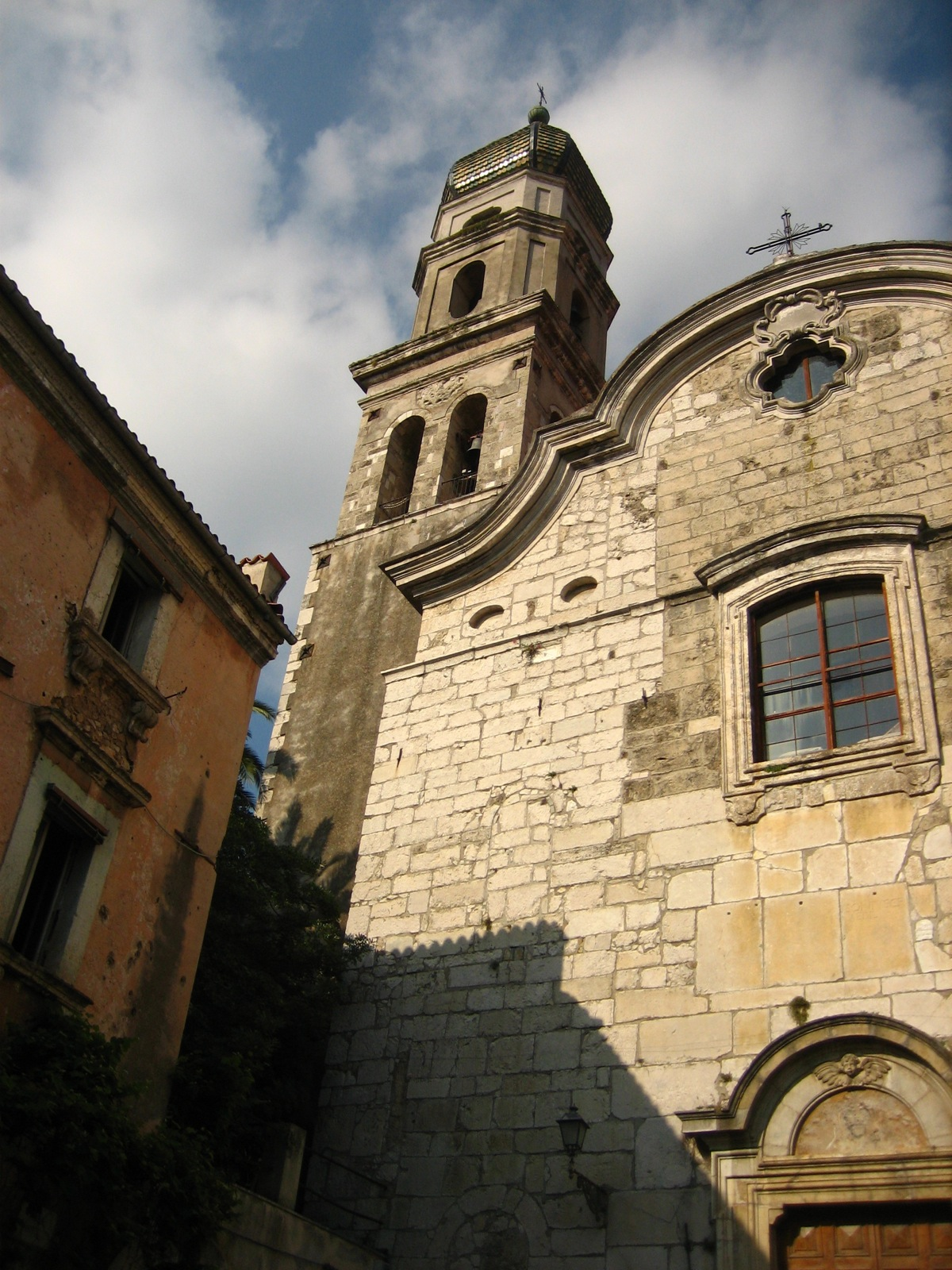
Church of the Annuziata, Venafro

== History ==
A church dates prior to the mid-1300s, but required rebuilding after the earthquake of 1349, and was completed by 1387, under the patronage of a Confraternity of flagellants. The walls include spolia from an ancient Roman temple on the site. The church was first enlarged in 1519. The present layout derives from a reconstruction in 1641, granting it present mainly-Baroque style. The bell-tower was built in the 1750s.

The facade, with a rounded pediment, has a central portal flanked by two ancient Roman column elements, presumably from the prior temple at the site. The main portal completed in the 18th century has an arch with the emblem of the confraternity.

The nave was decorated with stucco by Carlo Giuseppe Tersini and Giovanni Domenico Lorenzi in 1757, and frescoed by Paolo Sperduti. The second altar has 15th-century alabaster tiles depicting the Kiss of Judas, the Flagellation, Exit to Calvary, the Crucifixion, the Deposition, The Mass at the Tomb, the Resurrection. A number of altarpieces in the church were painted by Giacinto Diana. The 1st altar on the left has a 16th-century canvas depicting the Mystical marriage of St Catherine. The main altarpiece is an Annunciation attributed to Girolamo Imparato.
