= Cristoforo Numai =

Italian Franciscan

- Cardinal-Priest of Santa Maria in Ara Coeli
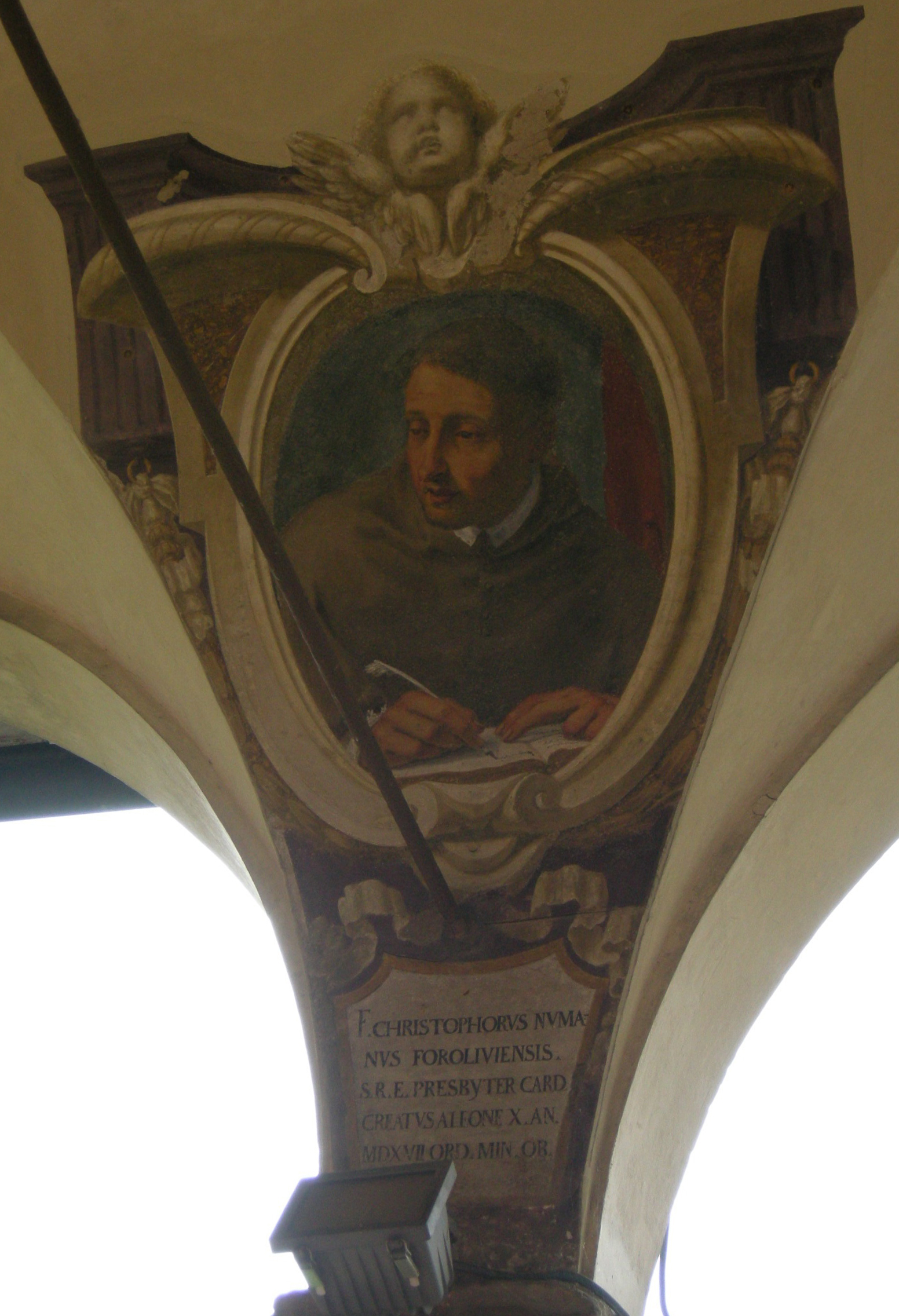
- Cristoforo Numai
- Church: Catholic Church

Orders
- Consecration: 5 Jul 1523 by Pope Hadrian VI

Personal details
- Born: Forlì, Italy
- Died: 23 March 1528

Cristoforo Numai (died 23 March 1528) was an Italian Franciscan, who became minister general of the Friars Minor and a cardinal.

== Life ==
A native of Forlì, his date of birth is uncertain. In his youth he studied at Bologna and, after joining the Friars Minor, was sent to complete his studies at Paris. In 1507 he was elected vicar provincial of his order at Bologna, in 1514 vicar general of the Cismontane Franciscan families, and in 1517 he became minister general of the whole order of Friars Minor. Less than a month later he was raised, in spite of his protests, to the cardinalate by Pope Leo X, who in presence of the Sacred College paid a splendid tribute to Christopher's great learning and prudence and to his still greater holiness of life.

In 1520 he became Bishop of Alatri and Bishop of Isernia in Italy, and in 1526 Bishop of Riez in Provence. He subsequently fulfilled the office of Apostolic legate to the King of France, and later became Apostolic nuncio and commissary for the construction of the Vatican Basilica, being then invested with the temporal dominion of Bertinoro.

During the Sack of Rome (1527) by the soldiers of the Duke of Bourbon, Christopher suffered many hardships and insults, on account of which he received letters of condolence from Pope Clement VII, Francis I of France, and Henry VIII of England. He took refuge in Ancona, but died the next year as a consequence of the inflicted injuries. His remains were transferred back from Ancona to Rome, and placed in the Church of Ara Coeli.

== Works ==
Besides an Exhortatio ad Galliarum regem Franciscum I in Turcas and a number of letters addressed to that king and the other rulers concerning the liberation of Clement VII, Christopher is said by Luke Wadding and others to have written several treatises on theological and ascetical questions, all of which appear to have perished during the sacking of Rome.

== Sources ==
- - Luke Wadding, Annales Minorum ad annum 1517, XVI, nn. xxiv and xxxv
  - Sbaralea, Supplementum, Pt. I (1908), 207
  - Picconi, Cenni biografice sugli uomini illustri della francescana provincia di Bologna, I (1894), 380.

Catholic Church titles
Preceded by Graziano Santucci	Administrator of Alatri; 1517–1528	Succeeded by Filippo Ercolani
Preceded by	Superior General of Order of Observant Friars Minor; 1517–1518	Succeeded by Francisco de Quiñones
Preceded by	Cardinal-Priest of San Matteo in Merulana; 1517	Succeeded by Egidio da Viterbo
Preceded by	Cardinal-Priest of Santa Maria in Ara Coeli; 1517–1528	Succeeded by Francisco Mendoza Bobadilla
Preceded by Massimo Bruni Corvino	Bishop of Isernia; 1523–1524	Succeeded by Antonio Numai
Preceded by Thomas Lascaris de Tenda	Administrator of Riez; 1526–1527	Succeeded by François de Dinteville
