= Venafro Cathedral =

Cathedral in Venafro, Molise, Italy

Coordinates: 41.4838°N 14.0382°E

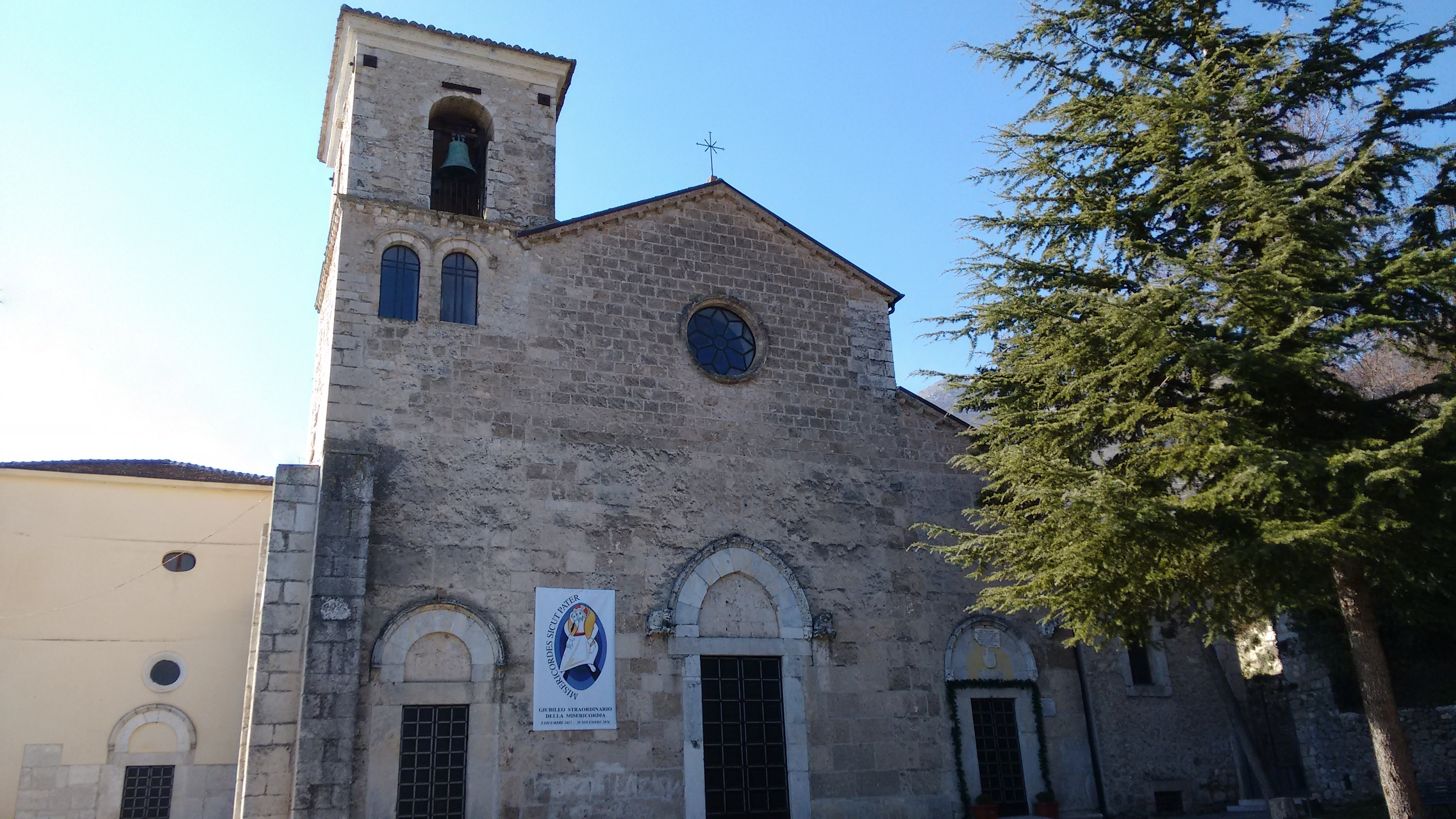
West front

Venafro Cathedral (Italian: Duomo di Venafro; Concattedrale di Santa Maria Assunta) is a Roman Catholic cathedral in Venafro in the region of Molise, Italy, dedicated to the Assumption of the Virgin Mary. Previously the seat of the Bishops of Venafro, it is now a co-cathedral in the diocese of Isernia-Venafro.

== History ==
The cathedral is not only the biggest church in the city but is also one of the largest in the region. It stands at the foot of the Parco Oraziano, a park leading up into the surrounding mountains. At the end of the fifth century, the first Christian church on the site was constructed by Bishop Constantine over a pagan temple, reusing building materials from older buildings both Roman and Palaeo-Christian. This early building was subsequently plundered and fell into ruin.

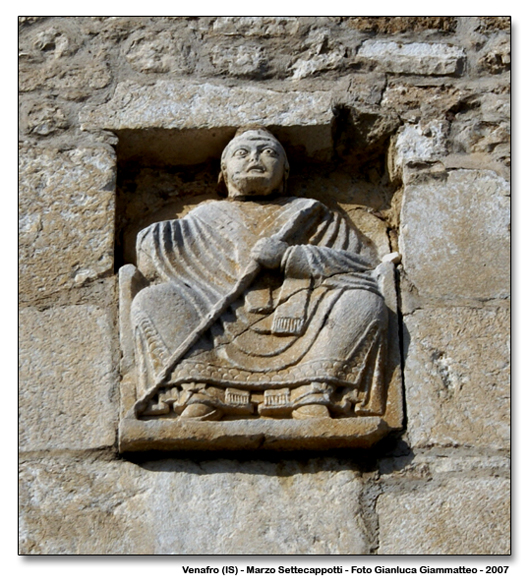
Bas-relief of Pietro of Ravenna ("Marzo Settecappotti")

It was rebuilt in the second half of the 11th century by Bishop Pietro of Ravenna, commemorated by a bas-relief known locally, from its unusual appearance, as "Marzo Settecappotti" ("March Seven-Coats"). This building too had a dramatic existence: it was looted of all moveable goods by the troops of Emperor Frederick II, damaged by earthquakes in 1349 and 1456, set on fire by order of Louis XI of France and forced to accommodate the troops of Charles VIII in 1495. It was consequently subject to continual repairs, modifications and reconstructions. At the end of the 17th century the so-called Cappellone ("big chapel") was constructed (see below). From the end of the 17th century, and throughout the 18th, the cathedral was refurbished in the Baroque style: at the end of these substantial additions, the church was re-dedicated on 21 October 1764 by Bishop Francesco Saverio Stabile.

The cathedral's present aspect is due to restoration works carried out in the 1960s and 1970s which removed the Baroque additions, returning it to a Gothic medieval appearance.

== Interior ==
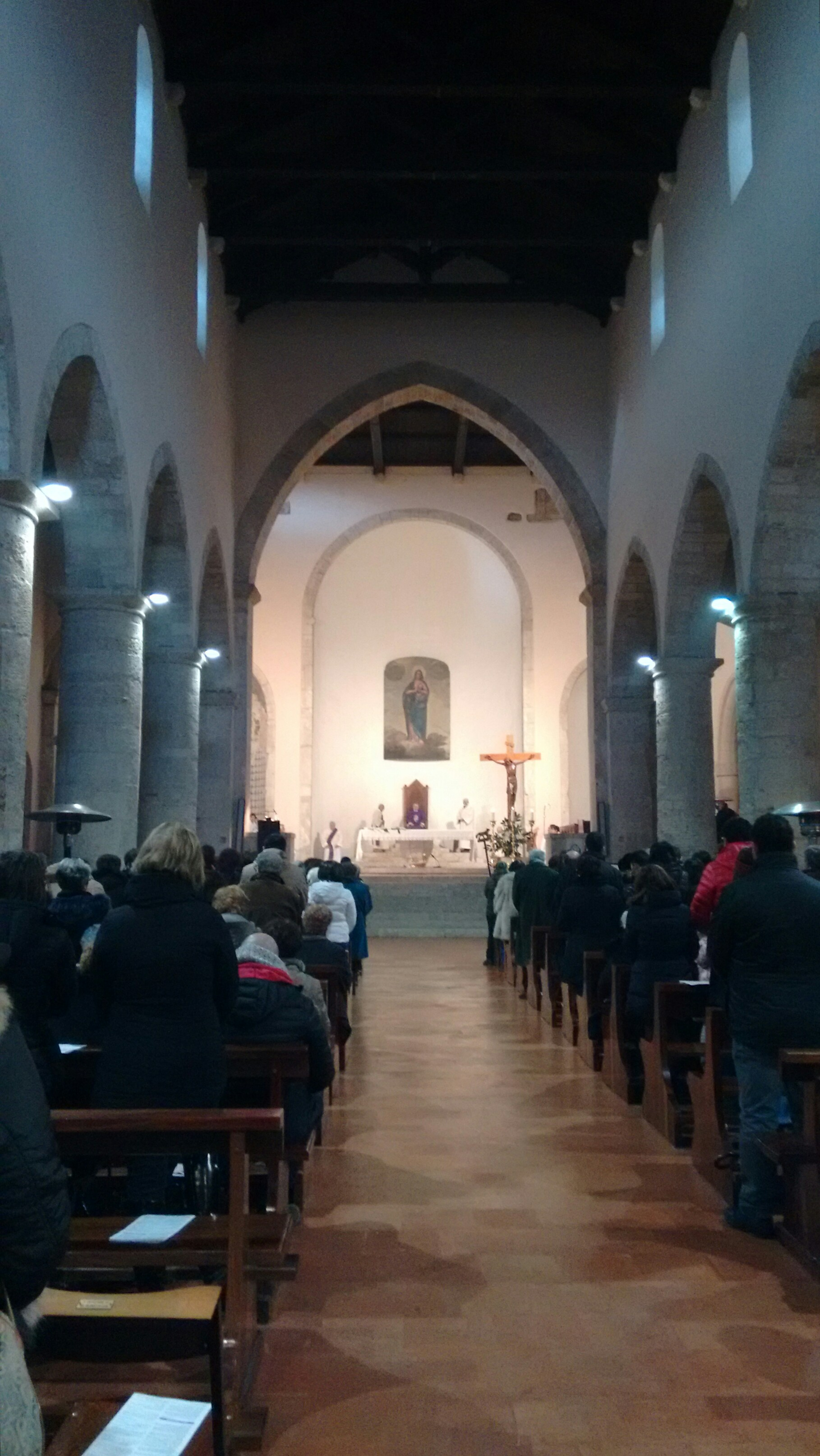
Interior, looking east along the nave

The interior has three aisles decorated by pictorial work from the 14th century. The church has five portals: the one to the right of the main portal is a holy door (porta sancta) of 1508. Four side-chapels open off the southern aisle, while off the northern aisle is the very large chapel known as the "Cappellone", built in the late 17th century and remodelled in the 19th, for the administration and reservation of the sacrament.

The chapel of the Crucifix (Crucefisso) was completed in the 16th century. The altarpiece is attributed to the school of Domenico Antonio Vaccaro. The marble bust (1795) of the cleric, (Primicerio) Antonio Rosario De bellis, was completed by Michele Coppa.
