= Venafro =

- Comune
- Città di Venafro
- Coat of arms

- Venafro within the Province of Isernia

- Location within Italy Location within Molise
- Coordinates: 41°29′4″N 14°2′45″E
- Country: Italy
- Region: Molise
- Province: Isernia (IS)
- Frazioni: Ceppagna, Le Noci, Vallecupa

Government
  - Mayor: Alfredo Ricci

Area
  - Total: 45 km^{2} (17 sq mi)
- Elevation: 222 m (728 ft)

Population (31 September 2021)
  - Total: 11,079
  - Density: 250/km^{2} (640/sq mi)
- Demonym: Venafrani
- Time zone: UTC+1 (CET)
  - Summer (DST): UTC+2 (CEST)
- Postal code: 86079
- Dialing code: 0865
- ISTAT code: 094052
- Patron saint: SS. Nicandro, Marciano and Daria
- Saint day: 17 June
- Website: Official website

Venafro (Latin: Venafrum; Ancient Greek: Οὐέναφρον (Ouénaphron)) is a comune in the province of Isernia, region of Molise, Italy. It has a population of 11,079, having expanded quickly in the post-war period.

== Geography ==
Situated at the foot of Mount Santa Croce, elevation 1,026 metres (3,366 ft) above sea level, at a height of 222 metres (728 ft) above sea level, the elevation of the municipal territory varies from 158 to 1,205 metres (518 to 3,953 ft) above sea level. The municipality stretches along the homonymous plain crossed by the Volturno and San Bartolomeo rivers whose sources are located in the center of the Venafro plain. Other notable mountains are: Monte Sambucaro at 1,205 metres (3,953 ft), Monte Cesima at 1,180 metres (3,870 ft), Monte Corno at 1,054 metres (3,458 ft), Monte Santa Croce or Cerino, at 1,026 metres (3,366 ft), and Colle San Domenico at 921 metres (3,022 ft). Once a part of the province of Terra di Lavoro in Campania (territory with which it is still culturally linked), the city is now known as the door of Molise and is of major importance to the socio-economic dynamics of the province due to its highly developed economy, and is considered one of the four central industrial cores in the region.

=== Climate ===
Venafro since ancient times is known for its mild climate. Winter is quite cold with rain; snow rarely leads to modest accumulations. Frosts are common; the absolute minimum temperature in the last 10 years was −6.4 °C (20.5 °F) in 2005. The intermediate seasons are milder but with frequent precipitation. Summer is very hot with temperatures often reaching 30 °C (86 °F); the absolute maximum temperature of the last 10 years was about 37.6 °C (99.7 °F) in 2007. This fairly mild climate derives from being in an exposed southern plain closed from the mountains; but in periods of high pressure thermal excursions temperatures may vary 15 to 20 °C (59 to 68 °F) between day and night.

== History ==
=== Ancient era ===
Although its founding is attributed to Diomedes, child of Tydeus and Deipyle, characters in Greek mythology, the ancient name of Venafrum derives from Samnite sources. On the plain, there have been found numerous findings that suggest the existence of human settlements in prehistoric times. The only occasion on which Venafrum figures prominently in history is during the Social War, 88 BCE, when it was betrayed into the hands of the Samnite leader Marius Egnatius, and two Roman cohorts that formed the garrison were put to the sword. Lucius Cornelius Sulla razed settlements around present day Venafro. In January 49 BCE, Pompey, coming from Teano, camped nearby. Cicero more than once alludes to the great fertile ground of the territory, that the tribune Rullus proposed by his agrarian law to divide among the Roman citizens. This project proved abortive, but a colony (Colonia Augusta Julia Venafrum) was founded at Venafrum under Augustus, and the city continued henceforth to bear the title of Colonia, which is found both in Point's works and in inscriptions. In the Augustan era, much attention was given to the aqueduct (Rivus Venafranus) that carried water of the Volturno river from Rocchetta a Volturno. Tye town is mentioned by Horace as a resort, renowned for its amenities, while Pliny the Elder also speaks of the waters located there. In Roman times the economy developed a renowned olive oil industry which according to Pliny was the best in the Roman Empire. When the Romans brought Christianity to the Apennine Plains, a bishopric for the Roman Catholic church was established in the 5th century.

=== Middle Ages ===
Between 774 and 787 the Venafro plain was crossed by the troops of Charlemagne, which clashed with the Lombards of the Principality of Benevento. According to Monte Cassino chronicler Erchempertus, in 861, Venafro was occupied by Emir Sawdan of the Emirate of Bari. After the dark period of the Middle Ages, which saw Venafro sinking into poverty and disease in later centuries the city enjoyed an era of expansion and prosperity, with numerous churches and palaces dating from that era that changed the face of the city. Feudal families that reigned over Venafro were the Savelli, Spinelli, Peretti, and the Caracciolo of Miranda, Italy.

=== Modern era ===
From autumn 1943 to spring of 1944 Venafro was the scene (along with Pozzilli, Filignano, San Pietro Infine) of bitter fighting between the Germans, entrenched in the mountains to the north and the British – French – U.S. along the Gustav Line, during the Battle of Monte Cassino. Mistaken for Monte Cassino, Venafro was hit hard by aerial bombing on March 15, 1944. Venafro until 1863 was included in the territory of the Terra di Lavoro (currently the province of Caserta), until the establishment of the province of Campobasso was annexed to that territory, and then got incorporated into the Molise region. In 1970, it was incorporated into the newly formed province of Isernia, despite controversy and often violent protests that favored to remain part of the province of Caserta. In the spring of 1984, the city was severely damaged by the earthquake originating in the nearby Valle di Comino, in the province of Frosinone. In 1987, the city was named by Censis (Centro Studi Sociali Investments, an institute of socio-economic research), one of the 100 municipalities of the "Great Little Italy." Since 1994, it has been a member of the ANCO (National Association of (Olive) Oil Citys). On April 25, 2005, Venafro was awarded the gold medal for Civil Valor from the President of the Republic, Carlo Azeglio Ciampi, for its valor during the air bombardment it suffered during World War II.

== Main sights ==
Venafro can be divided into two distinct areas: the old town, of Roman origin, enclosed by walls and dominated by Castle Pandone, and new town that has several newly developed neighborhoods.

=== Historic center ===
The old town (Centro histórico) was built on the existing Roman urban structure and many of the buildings still have Roman foundations. It was depopulated from the 1960s and many buildings were damaged by successive earthquakes. Government funding for repairs came slowly to the province, but by 2000 most buildings had been structurally secured, although remained unoccupied. Slowly a new generation started to reside in some of the properties from middle of the noughties. The upper floors of buildings are residences, while some lower floors of the premises are used as shops.

=== Castle Pandone ===
Built in the highest part of the city, it derives its name from the Lombards who built it on an older fortification in the 10th century. In the 14th century it was expanded with the addition of three circular towers, and was transformed in the 15th century by adding a moat. Frescoes depicting horses, commissioned by Count Enrico Pandone, were added during the Renaissance. Currently, the halls of this castle have become the Museo Nazionale del Molise - an art gallery in which paintings are collected from several different churches abandoned or closed in Venafro. It also hosted an exhibition curated by Cultural Documents, Winterline by the Scottish artist Elaine Shemilt (12 Decrmbet 2014- 30 May 2016). The exhibition retraces, through drawing, print, painting and video the routes of the Allied and German conflict on the adjacent territory during 1943 and 1944. Four of Shemilt's works were purchased for the national collection (MiBACT - Ministero dei beni e delle attività culturali e del turismo) in 2016. A permanent exhibition hall to house the work of Romeo Musa was inaugurated in May 2014.

=== Verlasce Roman Amphitheater ===
Located in the center of modern Venafro and despite development overlap are the still visible remains of the Roman elliptical amphitheater. It is believed that the stands could hold up to 15,000 spectators. Until some time ago, this structure housed stables and stores of agricultural tools.

=== Roman theater ===
On the Decumanus Maximus is a theater of considerable size and presents a scaenae frons of about 60 m, with an auditorium capable of hosting 3,500 spectators. After a series of archaeological excavations and interventions to bring it to light, this monument is paired with the nearby odeon.

=== Other Samnite, Roman and medieval remains. ===
In the town center are visible traces of a Roman aqueduct, the walled city of the Samnites dating from the 4th century BCE and one polygonal Samnite structure of the 1st century BCE. Of Roman origin is the "Torricella", a fortified structure recently restored to its former glory. Other monuments include "Market Tower" (Palazzo Caracciolo), a defensive structure with its massive medieval battlements, in defense of that which once corresponded to the eastern gate of Venafro, and the Palazzo Libertina of the 20th century, which served as a hydroelectric plant to provide power to the town.

=== Churches ===
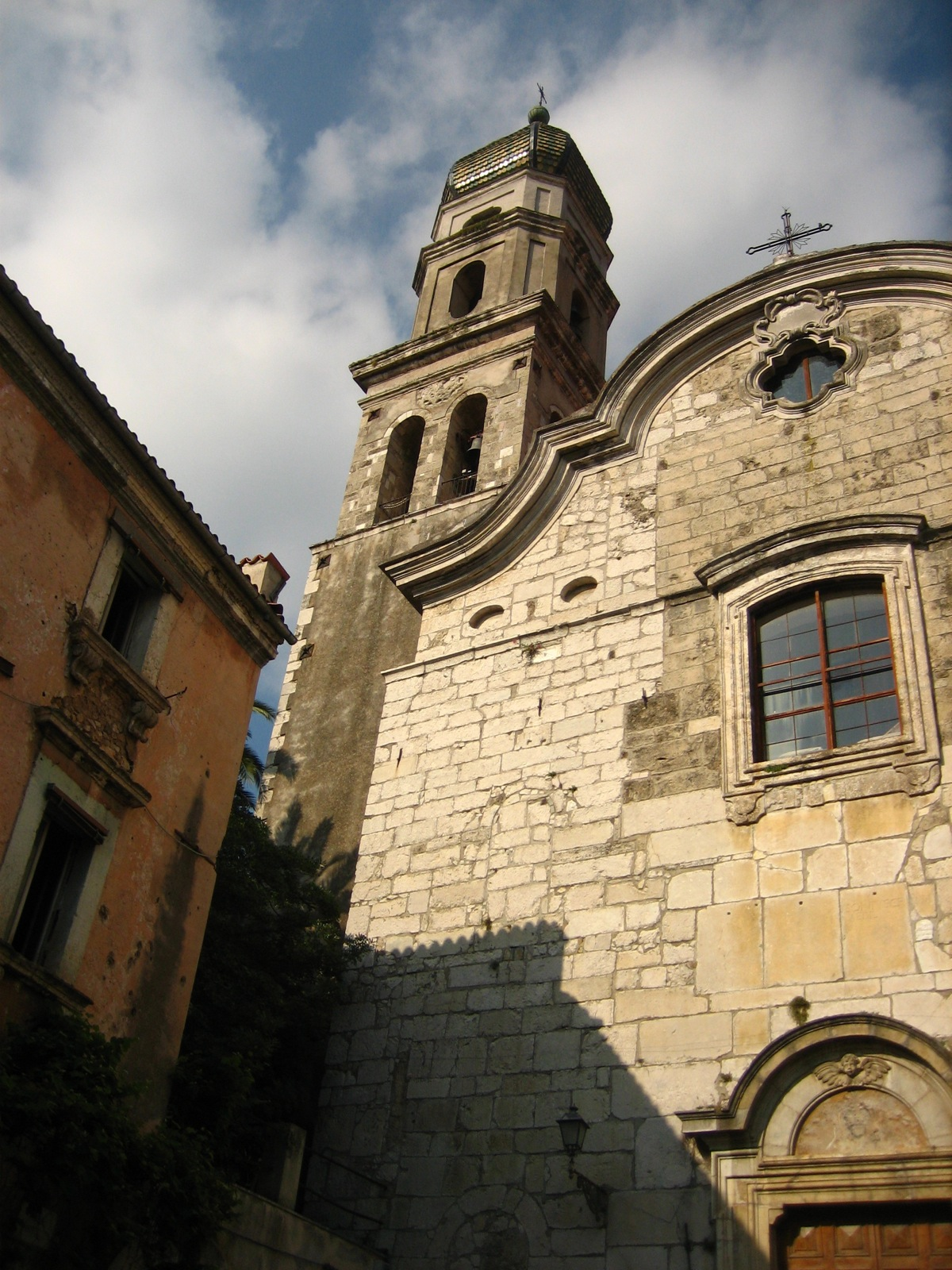
Church of the Annunciation

Due to a large number of churches in the area Venafro was given the nickname "The city of 33 churches." These are many churches of various sizes and ages in the historic center and in the foothills area. Unfortunately, many places of worship such as Santi Martino e Nicola are now closed and abandoned.

==== Cathedral ====
Venafro Cathedral, the largest church of the city, is situated at the foot of Parco Oraziano. Dating from the 5th century, it was built under Bishop Constantine in the place where for centuries there was a pagan temple. It is adorned with materials from other monuments of earlier eras (Roman elements, Christian decorations, and Bishop Pietro di Ravenna's bas-relief which is called "March Settecappotti"). The interior has three naves decorated with paintings from the 14th century. The current appearance is due to renovation works dating back to the 1960s and 1970s which have replacing the ancient Baroque style, bringing the back sacred aspects of the Gothic and Medieval eras. At the end of 1600 the "cappellone" was built; a chapel in which to administer the sacraments.

==== Annunziata or Church of the Annunciation ====
The church is an example of Baroque architecture built in the 14th century, and has been repeatedly amended over time. It was built with material from a nearby Roman theater and had a gabled façade. Over the centuries it underwent a major restoration and the church assumed its present Baroque appearance. The single nave interior preserves a crucifix of the 14th century. In a lateral niche is the silver bust of St. Nicandro with some relics of martyrs. The church also has a large frescoed dome, visible from every point of the city.

==== Basilica of San Nicandro and convent ====
The Basilica of San Nicandro was built atop Roman ruins on the eastern outskirts of the city, on the road to Isernia. The church has had many reconstructions and most recently restored in 2001. It features two naves and retains an altar in wood marquetry and pyrography. Under the altar is the crypt the tomb of St Nicandro was discovered, a spring called "Manna of St. Nicandro" also appears in the crypt.

==== Chiesa del Cristo or Church of Christ or of the Last Sacrament ====
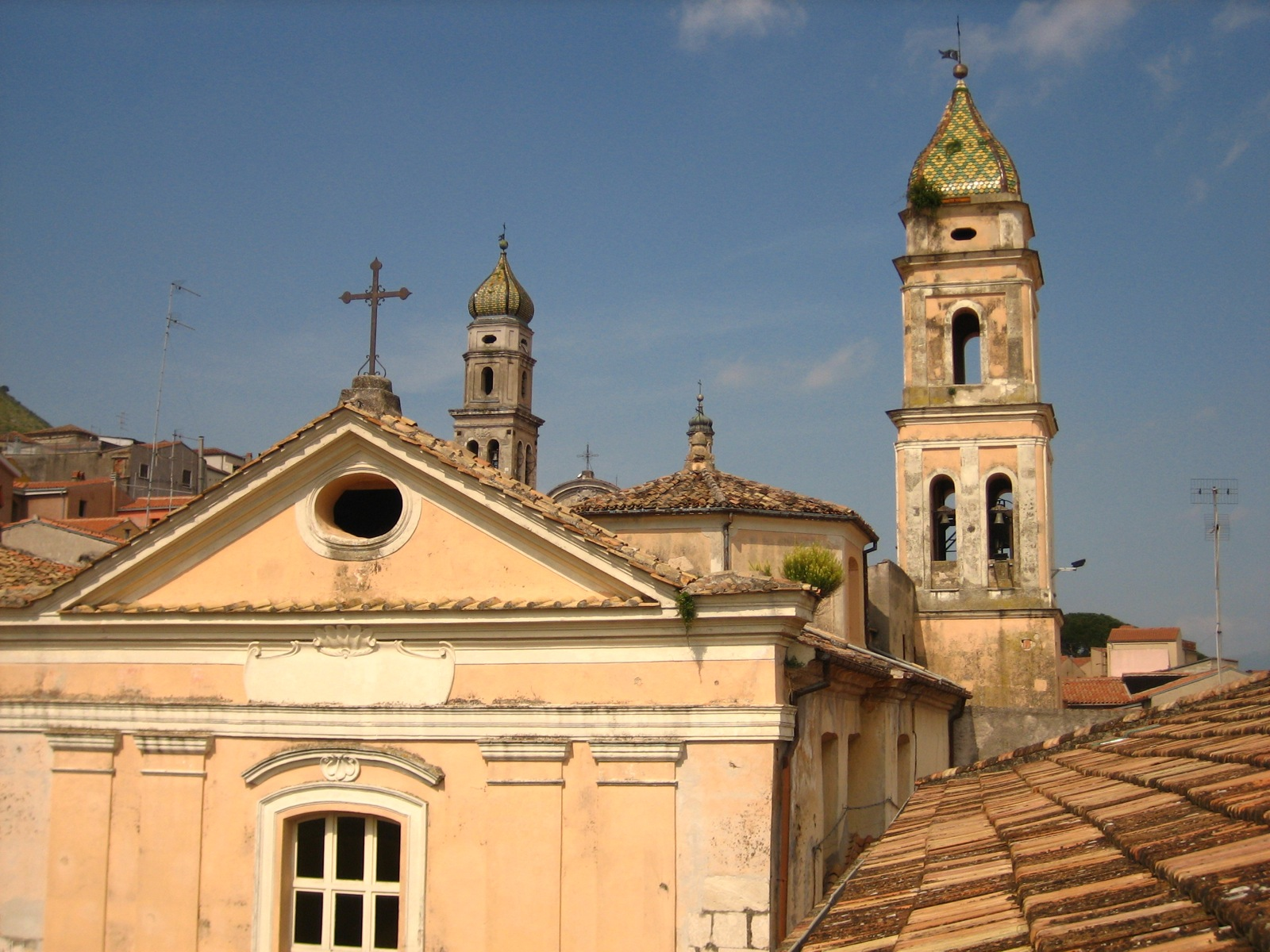
Façade and bell tower of Church of Christ

The church located on Via Cavour was built in the second half of the 16th century and expanded, taking the present form in the second half of the 17th century. The church has a single aisle and presents stucco cornices and capitals. There are several paintings and at the top of the nave in special niches are the statues of Four Evangelists. The church has two small domes with no windows, and a Baroque bell-tower, looking similar to the Church of the Annunciation. The façade has a large window and is preceded by a staircase.

==== National Archaeological Museum "Santa Chiara" ====
In an 18th-century monastic structure houses the Museo Archeologico Nazionale di Santa Chiara. Among the works exhibited are Roman artifacts: the "Venus of Venafro" by Antonine (2nd century AD), two large statues of men who are identified as Augustus and Tiberius, and the great memorial or "Tavola Acquaria" where the regulations designed to regulate the use (edict of Augustus) of the Roman aqueduct during the Augustan age.

=== French military cemetery ===
Along Highway 85 to Isernia, on an extended flat area is the French war cemetery in which are buried about 4,500 (but many have been exhumed) soldiers. Notable are the two thirds of African origin, mainly Moroccan, Algerian, Tunisian and Senegalese, who fell in large part during the Battle of Monte Cassino. A monument was erected that refers explicitly to the North African minarets decorated with ceramic tiles of blue, set against the whitewashed walls, and some inscriptions. Inside, there are tombs of the Unknown Soldier dedicated to soldiers: one Tunisian, one Algerian, and one Moroccan. All the tombs are arranged on the north-east south-west, with the gravestones facing north-east, with the exception of some graves, located behind the section of Jewish soldiers and animists. On each plaque by the name (if known) are the words (in French) "died for France".

== Parks ==
=== Wildlife preserve ===
Located at the border between Molise and Campania, in the municipalities of Venafro and Capriati a Volturno is a man-made wildlife preserve. The approximately 32 acres (130,000 m^{2}) of property, have been entrusted to World Wide Fund for Nature (WWF) Italy. Situated along the short stretch of the Volturno River, which marks the border between Molise and Campania, The Mortine Oasis occupies an artificial waterway created by the construction of a hydroelectric dam. The set of aquatic habitats are surrounded by a hygrophilous (willows, poplars, alders) forest. The lake and the woods are habitat for diverse aquatic fauna and waterfowl.

=== Regional Agricultural Historical Olive Park ===
The Parco Oraziano behind the city's cathedral became the Regional Agricultural Historical Olive Park of Venafro. A regional law aimed at establishing a protected area to preserve the heritage of Venafro's olives and olive trees. The Regional Agricultural Historical Olive Park of Venafro is the first park in the Mediterranean area with an olive theme.

== Festivals and traditions ==
=== Festival of Holy Martyrs and Patrons ===
The patron saints of the city are martyrs Nicandro, Marciano, and Daria (Daria consort of Nicandro) which are also the patrons of the Roman Catholic Diocese of Isernia-Venafro, whose feast occurs on June 17. The festival originated during an earthquake that struck the city in 1688, but the town escaped serious damage or casualties. The population bestowed an annual festival of thanksgiving on the first Sunday of June, to honor of their saints in gratitude of escaping harm Also, a bust was made of St. Nicandro in silver, later stolen and replaced by an identical copy, which is carried in procession during the festival. In 1933, under the high altar of the church of St. Nicandro the remains of the saint was found in a grave, from which originates the "Holy Manna" (spring water) at fixed intervals, so the crypt of the church has become a pilgrimage destination. Currently, the holiday begins on May 17 (Sant N'candriegl) with the month dedicated to the saints, with a procession and return to the church of the convent of St. Nicandro. The real party, one of the greatest attractions of the region, is celebrated by June 16 to 18 with performances and processions, and attracts thousands of faithful and tourists even outside the region. On June 16 there is a procession in the evening with a bust of St. Nicandro and relics from the church of the saint, followed by the solemn vespers presided by the bishop and the clergy. The sacred and venerated icons remain at the church for all the festivities. On the evening of the 16th there is a band concert in Market Square. On June 17, is the pontifical mass, involving the bishop and civil and religious leaders. During this ceremony, the mayor delivers keys of the city, symbolizing the protection of the people to patron saints. In the evening there is a concert in the square generally with a nationally known singer. The festival culminates with an impressive procession on the 18th, followed by thousands of people, in which the statues of three saints are carried from the church of St. Nicandro to that of the Annunciation.

=== Other festivals ===
Other festivals include:

- March 19: nd i Favor r' San Giuseppe, or the lighting of bonfires in the various squares in the historic city center.
- Good Friday: procession of Christ and Our Lady of Sorrows.
- May 1: the Feast of the Cross.
- Pentecost Sunday celebrates Madonna of the Roses, with a feast of near the church of the same name, with a procession and musical entertainment in the square.
- On the Sunday of Corpus Domini is held the traditional procession through the streets of downtown.
- June 13: There is a procession of Saint Anthony of Padua for the old town from the church of the Annunciation.
- July 1 and 2: Our Lady of Grace feast.
- July 15 and 16: Celebrates Our Lady of Mount Caramel. 15 band concerts and fireworks.
- August 1 the 2nd: Our Lady of the Angels celebration.
- September 23: St Pio of Pietrelcina celebration in the convent of St. Nicandro with a processional and musical entertainment in the square.
- The first Sunday of October: Celebration of Our Lady of the Rosary in the village of Ceppagna with procession and various shows.
- November 11: Saint Martino and Nicola celebration
- December 8: feast of the Immaculate Conception with a fair in the morning.

== People ==
- St. Nicandro, San Marciano, Santa Daria, martyrs
- Antonio de Venafro, Italian Leader
- Leopoldo Pilla, scientist and patriot
- Amico da Venafro, Italian leader
- Edoardo Cimorelli, parliamentarian
- Giovanni de Amicis, judge and historian
- Gennaro Morra, poet and writer

== Economy ==
Agriculture is traditionally conducted at a household level. In particular, the historic production of olive oil it is still active. Venafro has obtained the status of "Oil City", and boasts a native species of olive, Aurino. Engineering, manufacturing, construction, detergents, agricultural and food products industries also make up Venafro's economy. Tourism remains underdeveloped despite artistic, architectural, historical and cultural items that Venafro has to offer.

== Transportation ==
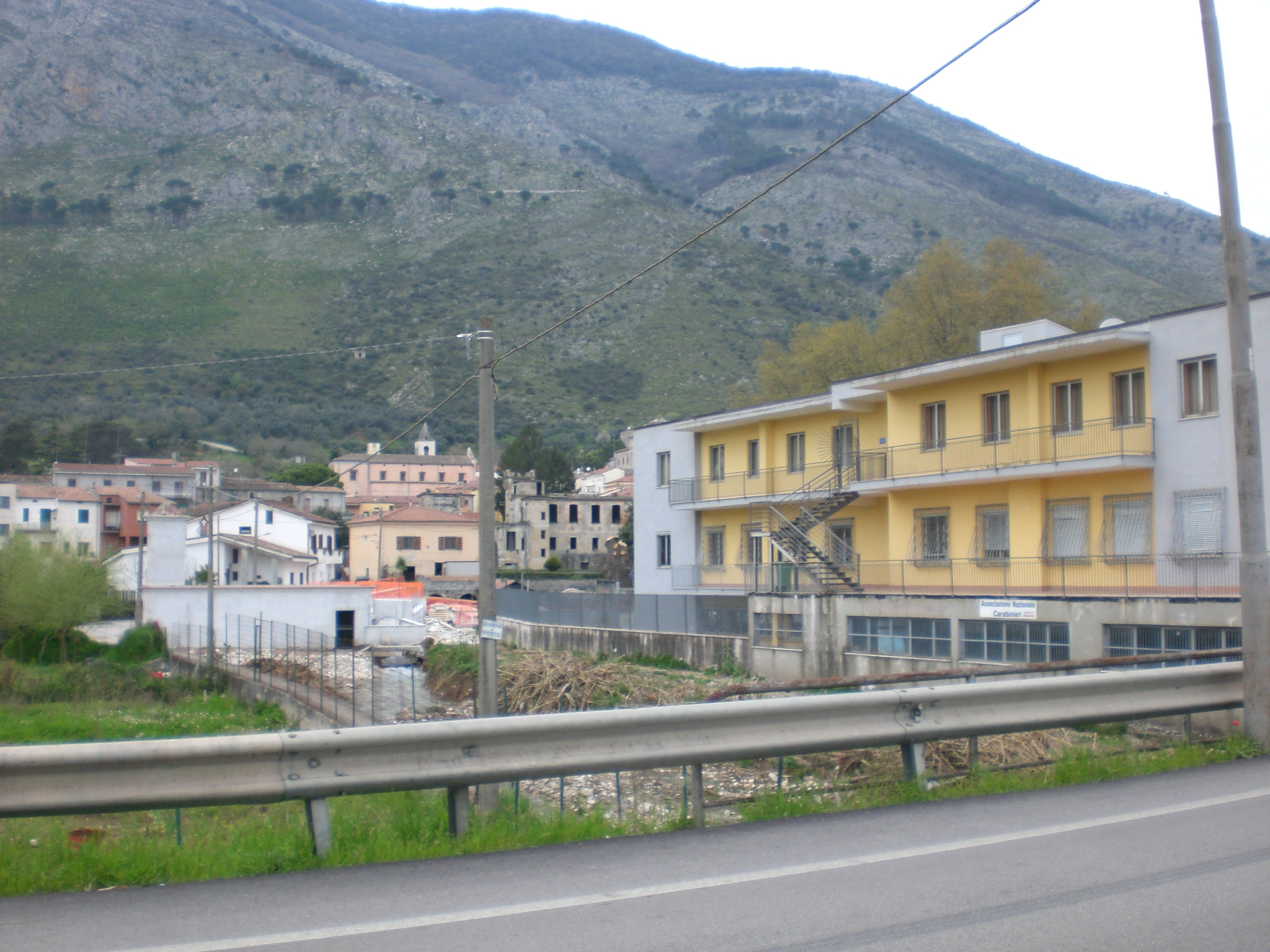
Venafro highway.

Venafro has many road and rail connections due to its geographical position, being placed right at the south-western region of Molise. The town is crossed by the SS 85 Venafrana, which connects the Caianello motorway interchange with Molise and Campania; SS6 Casilina, linking with Lazio and Molise San Vittore del Lazio motorway. Finally, the municipality is crossed by the Vairano-Isernia railway.

== Frazioni ==
- Ceppagna has about 600 inhabitants. It is almost 300 metres (980 ft) above sea level and lies 4 kilometres (2.5 mi) from the capital city. The largest of the villages of Venafro, it rests on the slopes of Mount Sammucro, elevation 1,205 metres (3,953 ft), near the border with Campania. Already inhabited in ancient times, by Romans and Samnites, Ceppagna has considerable historical important sites. The name "Ceppagna" comes from the Latin cippus, meaning engraved marking stone.
- Vallecupa has about 150 inhabitants and is located as the name implies in a small valley on the border with Ontario, Italy near Mount Cesima.
- Le Noci has about 60 inhabitants. This residential settlement is on the slopes of Mount Sambucaro, elevation 1,205 metres (3,953 ft). It is about 400 metres (1,300 ft) above sea level and enjoys a cooler climate than the capital city, from which it is about 5 kilometres (3 mi).

== Twin cities ==
Venafro is twinned with:

- Cēsis, Latvia
- Cassino, Italy

== See also ==
- Venafrum, ancient Roman town
- U.S. Venafro, local football club
- Roccapipirozzi, a village founded by the refugees from Venafro
