= Diego Merino (bishop) =

Italian Catholic prelate

Most Reverend Diego Merino
- Bishop of Isernia
- Church: Catholic Church
- Diocese: Diocese of Isernia
- In office: 1626–1637
- Predecessor: Gian Gerolamo Campanili
- Successor: Domenico Giordani
- Previous post: Bishop of Montepeloso (1623–1626)

Orders
- Consecration: 26 November 1623 by Giovanni Garzia Mellini

Personal details
- Born: 1570 Baeza, Spain
- Died: 1 January 1637 (age 67) Isernia, Italy

Diego Merino, O. Carm. (1570 – 1 January 1637) was a Catholic prelate who served as Bishop of Isernia (1626–1637) and Bishop of Montepeloso (1623–1626).

== Biography ==
Diego Merino was born in Baeza, Spain in 1570 and ordained a priest in the Order of the Brothers of the Blessed Virgin Mary of Mount Carmel. On 20 November 1623, he was appointed during the papacy of Pope Paul V as Bishop of Montepeloso. On 26 November 1623, he was consecrated bishop by Giovanni Garzia Mellini, Cardinal-Priest of Santi Quattro Coronati with Alessandro Bosco, Bishop of Gerace, and Tommaso Ximenes, Bishop of Fiesole, serving as co-consecrators. On 24 August 1626, he was appointed during the papacy of Pope Urban VIII as Bishop of Isernia. He served as Bishop of Isernia until his death on 1 January 1637. While bishop, he was the principal co-consecrator of Giulio Cesare Sacchetti, Bishop of Gravina di Puglia (1623).

== External links and additional sources ==
- Cheney, David M. "Diocese of Montepeloso". Catholic-Hierarchy.org. (Chronology of Bishops) ^{[self-published]}
- Chow, Gabriel. "Diocese of Irsina (Italy)". GCatholic.org. (Chronology of Bishops) ^{[self-published]}
- Cheney, David M. "Diocese of Isernia-Venafro". Catholic-Hierarchy.org. (for Chronology of Bishops) ^{[self-published]}
- Chow, Gabriel. "Diocese of Isernia-Venafro (Italy)". GCatholic.org. (for Chronology of Bishops) ^{[self-published]}

Catholic Church titles
Preceded by Honorius Griffagni	Bishop of Montepeloso; 1623–1626	Succeeded by Theodorus Pelleoni
Preceded by Gian Gerolamo Campanili	Bishop of Isernia; 1626–1637	Succeeded by Domenico Giordani
