= Diocese of Avezzano =

Latin Catholic diocese in Italy

Coordinates: 42.0411°N 13.4394°E

Diocese of Avezzano Dioecesis Marsorum

Catholic
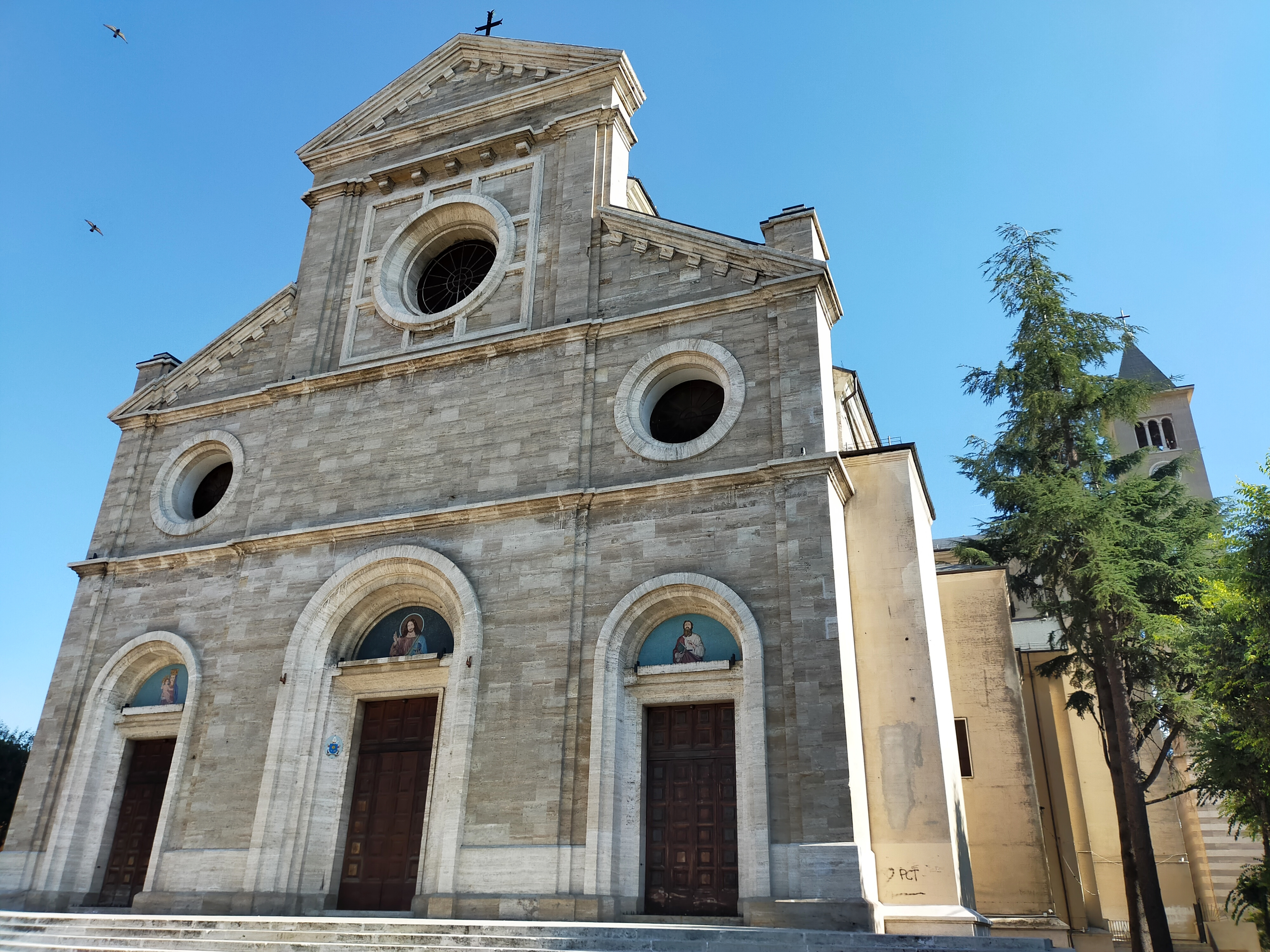
- Avezzano Cathedral

Location
- Country: Italy
- Ecclesiastical province: L'Aquila

Statistics
- Area: 1,700 km^{2} (660 sq mi)
- Population: Total; Catholics: (as of 2022); 115,950 (est.) ▼; 105,500 (guess) ▼
- Parishes: 100

Information
- Denomination: Catholic Church
- Sui iuris church: Latin Church
- Rite: Roman Rite
- Established: 7th Century ?
- Cathedral: Cathedral of St. Bartholomew the Apostle (Avezzano)
- Co-cathedral: Cocathedral of St. Mary of Grace (Pescina)
- Secular priests: 81 (diocesan) ▲15 (Religious Orders) ▼8 Permanent Deacons ▲

Current leadership
- Pope: Leo XIV
- Bishop: Giovanni Massaro
- Bishops emeritus: Pietro Santoro

Map
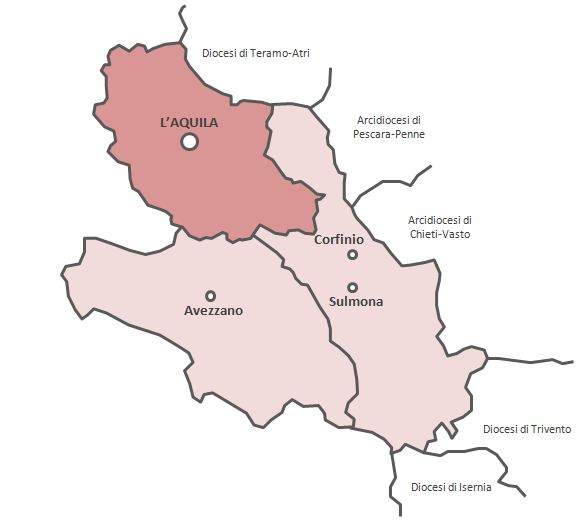

Website
- www.diocesidiavezzano.it

The Diocese of Avezzano (Latin: Dioecesis Marsorum) is a Latin Church diocese of the Catholic Church in central Italy, whose name in Italian was changed in 1986. It was previously known as the Diocese of Marsi, as it still is in Latin. It has been a suffragan of the Archdiocese of L'Aquila since 1972.

== History ==
The diocese of Marsi had its original seat at Pescina.

According to a local legend, the Gospel was preached to the Marsican region in Apostolic times by Mark the Evangelist. Rufinus, their bishop, was martyred about 240.

The episcopal seat was originally at the Church of Santa Sabina in San Benedetto dei Marsi (ancient and medieval Marruvium), but, as this place was isolated and therefore insecure, Pope Gregory XIII permitted, in 1580, the removal of the bishop's residence to Pescina, where the cathedral was completed in 1596.

Among the bishops of the diocese was Berardo (c.1110–1130) of the family of the Counts of the Marsi. He was educated at Montecassino, and became papal governor of the Campagna. On account of his justice and of his severity in that office, he was imprisoned by Pietro Colonna, but Pope Paschal II made him a cardinal, and bishop of his native town.

=== Division and reunion ===
Shortly after the beginning of the episcopate of Pandolfus in 1032, in the midst of intense civil strife, Pope Benedict IX divided the diocese of Marsi, leaving part to Pandolfus and giving the rest to Bishop Atto, a relative of the Theophylacts. Atto's cathedral was established at S. Maria di Carsoli, and he took possession both of the territory of Carsoli and the valley of the Nerfa river. At the general council held in the Lateran by Pope Victor II, on 18 April 1057, however, the decisions of Benedict IX were reversed, and the diocese of Marsi reunited in its original form. Pandulfus continued as its bishop, and Atto, at the insistence of the entire assembly, was transferred to the diocese of Chieti. On 9 December 1057, the new pope, Stephen IX, confirmed the decisions of the synod, and further confirmed Bishop Pandulf in the possession of the entire diocese of Marsi, including the church of Santa Sabina, of the ancient city of the Marsi, his episcopal seat.

On 25 February 1114, Pope Paschal II issued a bull, "Sicut iniusta poscentibus," confirming for Bishop Berardus all of the parish boundaries and enumerating all of his privileges and rights.

=== Transfer to Pescina ===
Pope Gregory XIII published the bull "In suprema dignitatis" on 1 January 1580, in response to petitions from Bishop Matthew, leaders, and citizens of the civitas Marsorum, who pointed out that for more than forty years the city had been devastated, the victim of wars. He granted their requests, and transferred the episcopal seat, the canons, all the benefices, and other diocesan apparatus to the church of Santa Maria delle Grazie in Pescina.

The diocesan seminary was begun by Bishop Giambattista Milanese (1562–1577), but not put into use until Bishop Matteo Colli issued a bull on 17 August 1580, in which he redirected the income of 53 benefices established by the duchess of Amalfi, as well as all the benefices on the lands of the Colonna and the Savelli.

Bishop Bartolomeo Peretti 1597–1628) showed immediately upon his appointment that he was a friend of the poor and the average citizen. But he made a bad name for himself among the aristocracy, particularly the Tornese, as he mixed into their financial, political, and marital business. Like his predecessor, he was litigious. Complaints from powerful men reached Rome, and in January 1600 he was summoned to Rome by Pope Clement VIII to give an accounting of his activities. He was lodged in the Castel Sant'Angelo, and forbidden to exercise the administration of the diocese of Marsi. An apostolic administrator, Sebastiano Ghislieri, was appointed, until he was named bishop of Strongoli on 30 April 1601. He was succeeded by Paolo Pagano, who died in November 1601, and then Fulgenzio Tomassetti of Pescina until 1606. He was succeeded by Pompeo Gallosio, the Provost of Celano, for five months in 1606, until Bishop Peretti was finally released in the middle of the year.

On 1 August 1606, Bishop Bartolomeo Peretti consecrated the cathedral of S. Maria delle Grazie.

Bishop Benedetto Mattei (1760–1776) made frequent trips during his episcopate both to Rome and to Naples, where he had family and diocesan business. On his return to the diocese, he preferred to stay at the family palazzo in Celano rather than in the less congenial Pescina, where the episcopal palace was in a run-down condition. The absence of the bishop was inconvenient for the canons of the cathedral Chapter of S. Maria delle Grazie in Pescina, and when Bishop Mattei set up a throne in the church of S. Giovanni in Celano for his pontifical convenience, even designating the church a co-cathedral, the Chapter was outraged. The bishop announced that he would make the arrangement permanent, but on 24 June 1776 he died.

=== Synods ===
A diocesan synod was an irregularly held, but important, meeting of the bishop of a diocese and his clergy. Its purpose was (1) to proclaim generally the various decrees already issued by the bishop; (2) to discuss and ratify measures on which the bishop chose to consult with his clergy; (3) to publish statutes and decrees of the diocesan synod, of the provincial synod, and of the Holy See.

The first diocesan synod was held by Bishop Giambattista Milanese (1562–1577), shortly after his return from the Council of Trent.

Bishop Bartolomeo Perretti held a diocesan synod in the cathedral of S. Maria delle Grazie on 10 June 1612. Bishop Ascanio de Gasparis (1650–1664) held a diocesan synod on 21–22 April 1653 in Pescina. A diocesan synod was held by Bishop Diego Petra (1664–1680) at Pescina on 25–27 July 1673. Bishop Francesco Corradini presided at a diocesan synod on 25 April 1686. Bishop Camillo Giovanni Rossi (1805–1818) held a diocesan synod on 10–12 September 1815 in the cathedral of Santa Maria delle Grazie.

=== Reorganization in the 20th century ===
The 1915 Avezzano earthquake destroyed 96% of the city of Avezzano and severely damaged much of the province of Aquila; there were estimated to be 30,000 deaths directly caused by the tremors.

In 1922, Abbot Placido Nicolini of the monastery of Santissima Trinità de Cava petitioned Pope Pius XI to allow the place called Paterno in the diocese of Marsico, which belonged to the city of Tramutola, to be assigned to the jurisdiction of the part of Tramutola which belonged to his abbey. On 29 May 1922, the Consistorial Congregation in the papal Curia issued the appropriate document granting the request. The diocese of Marsi therefore lost territory, population, and income.

Following the Second Vatican Council, and in accordance with the norms laid out in the council's decree, Christus Dominus chapter 40, Pope Paul VI ordered a reorganization of the ecclesiastical provinces in southern Italy. On 15 August 1972, a new ecclesiastical province was created, with L'Aquila, which had previously been directly subject to the Holy See, as the new metropolitan archbishopric. The diocese of the Marsi (later renamed Avezzano) and the diocese of Valva e Sulmona were appointed suffragans.

In 1986, Pope John Paul II was carrying out a general reorganization of the ecclesiastical provinces and dioceses of Italy, in accordance with the directions of the Second Vatican Council, the new 1984 concordat with the Republic of Italy, and canon and civil law. In the case of the diocese of Marsi, it was decided that the papal Curia would continue to use the official name Dioecesis Marsorum, but that in the Italian vernacular it should be referred to as Diocesi di Avezzano.

== Bishops of Marsi ==
=== to 1300 ===
...

- Luminosus (attested 649)

...

- Leodrisius (attested 853)

...

- Albericus (attested 964–968)
- Ratherius (attested 969–970)
- Guinisius (c.970s)

...

- Joannes (attested 1028)

...

- Atto (attested 1050–1057)
- Pandulfus (attested 1057–1071)

...

- Berardus (c.1110–1130)

...

- Ingeamus
- Thomas
- Anselmus
- Berardus
- Thomas
- Berardus (attested 1221–1223)
- Joannes (attested 1230)
- Oderisius (attested 1236–1241)
- Caesarius (attested 1254)
- Nicolaus
- Stephanus (attested 1267–1273)
- Jacobus de Venere (1286–1295)

=== 1300 to 1600 ===
- Jacobus Bussa, O.P. (1295–1326)
- Petrus Ferri (1327–1336)
- Tommaso Valignani (1336–1348)
- Tommaso Pucci (1348–1363)
- Giacomo Muti (1363–1365)
- Berardus (1365–after 1371)
- Petrus (1380) Avignon Obedience
- Giuliano Tomasi, O.F.M. (1380–1418) Avignon Obedience
- Giacomo (1384) Roman Obedience
- Gentile Maccafani (1385–1399) Roman Obedience
- Philippus (1398–1418) Roman Obedience
- Salvato Maccafani (1418–1419)
- Tommaso (1419–1429)
- Saba de Cartoni (1430–1446)
- Angelo Maccafani (1446–1470)
- Francesco Maccafani (1470–1471) resigned
- Gabriele Maccafani (1471–1511)
- Giacomo Maccafani (1511–1530).
- Giovanni Dionisio Maccafani (1530–1533)
- Marcello Crescenzi (1534–1546) appointed Administrator of Conza
- Francesco Micheli (Franzino Micheli) (1546–1548) appointed Bishop of Casale Monferrato
- Nicola de Virgiliis (1548–1562) resigned
- Giambattista Milanese (1562–1577)
- Matteo Colli (1579–1596)

=== since 1600 ===
- Bartolomeo Peretti 1597–1628)
- Baglione Carradoli (1628–1629)
- Muzio Colonna (1629–1632)
- Lorenzo Massimo (1632–1647)
- Giovanni Paolo Caccia (1648–1649)
- Ascanio de Gasparis (1650–1664)
- Diego Petra (1664–1680)
- Francesco Berardino Corradini (1680–1718)
- Muzio de' Vecchi (1719–1724)
- Giacinto Dragonetti, C.O. (1724–1730)
- Giuseppe Barone (1731–1741)
- Domenico Antonio Brizi (1741–1760)
- Benedetto Mattei (1760–1776)
- Francesco Vincenzo Lajezza 1776–1792)
- Giuseppe Bolognese (1797–1803)

Sede Vacante (1803–1805)

- Camillo Giovanni Rossi (1805–1818)
- Francesco Saverio Durini, O.S.B. (1818–1823) confirmed Bishop of Aversa
- Giuseppe Segna (1824–1840) died
- Michel' Angelo Sorrentino (1843–1863) died
- Federico de Giacomo (1871–1884) died
- Enrico de Dominis (Dominicis) (1884–1894) appointed Archbishop of Amalfi
- Marino Russo (1895–1903) died
- Francesco Giacci (1904–1909) resigned
- Nicola Cola (1910–1910) resigned
- Pio Marcello Bagnoli, O.C.D. (1910–1945) died
- Domenico Valerii (1945–1973) retired
- Vittorio Ottaviani (1973–1977) resigned
- Biagio Vittorio Terrinoni, O.F.M. Cap. (1977–1990) retired

== Bishops of Avezzano ==
Italian name changed: 30 September 1986
Metropolitan: Archdiocese of L'Aquila

- Armando Dini (1990 –1998) appointed Archbishop of Campobasso-Boiano
- Lucio Angelo Renna, O. Carm. (1999–2006) appointed Bishop of San Severo
- Pietro Santoro (2007–2021)
- Giovanni Massaro (2021– )

== Bibliography ==
=== Episcopal lists ===
- Eubel, Conradus, ed. (1913). Hierarchia catholica (in Latin). Vol. I (second ed.). Münster: Libreria Regensbergiana.
- Eubel, Conradus, ed. (1914). Hierarchia catholica (in Latin). Vol. II (second ed.). Münster: Libreria Regensbergiana.
- Eubel, Conradus; Gulik, Guilelmus (1923). Hierarchia catholica (in Latin). Vol. III (second ed.). Münster: Libreria Regensbergiana.
- Gams, Pius Bonifatius (1873). Series episcoporum Ecclesiae catholicae: quotquot innotuerunt a beato Petro apostolo (in Latin). Ratisbon: Typis et Sumptibus Georgii Josephi Manz. p. 893.
- Gauchat, Patritius (Patrice) (1935). Hierarchia catholica (in Latin). Vol. IV (1592-1667). Münster: Libraria Regensbergiana.
- Ritzler, Remigius; Sefrin, Pirminus (1952). Hierarchia catholica medii et recentis aevi (in Latin). Vol. V (1667-1730). Patavii: Messagero di S. Antonio.
- Ritzler, Remigius; Sefrin, Pirminus (1958). Hierarchia catholica medii et recentis aevi (in Latin). Vol. VI (1730-1799). Patavii: Messagero di S. Antonio.
- Ritzler, Remigius; Sefrin, Pirminus (1968). Hierarchia Catholica medii et recentioris aevi (in Latin). Vol. VII (1800–1846). Monasterii: Libreria Regensburgiana.
- Remigius Ritzler; Pirminus Sefrin (1978). Hierarchia catholica Medii et recentioris aevi (in Latin). Vol. VIII (1846–1903). Il Messaggero di S. Antonio.
- Pięta, Zenon (2002). Hierarchia catholica medii et recentioris aevi (in Latin). Vol. IX (1903–1922). Padua: Messagero di San Antonio. ISBN 978-88-250-1000-8.

=== Studies ===
- Cappelletti, Giuseppe (1870). Le chiese d'Italia dalla loro origine sino ai nostri giorni (in Italian). Vol. vigesimoprimo (21). Venezia: Antonelli. pp. 473–479.
- Cercone, Franco (1975), "Le constitutiones synodales marsicanae," (in Italian), in: Bullettino della deputazione abruzzese di Storia patria LXV (1975), pp. 621–627.
- D'Avino, Vincenzio (1848). Cenni storici sulle chiese arcivescovili, vescovili, e prelatizie (nullius) del regno delle due Sicilie (in Italian). Naples: dalle stampe di Ranucci. pp. 312–315. [article by Canon Biagio d'Alessandro]
- Di Pietro, Andrea (1869). Sulle principali antichità marsicane. Cinque paragrafi. (in Italian). Aquila: Tip. Aternina 1869.
- Di Pietro, Andrea (1872). Catalogo dei Vescovi della diocesi dei Marsi. (in Italian). Avezzano: Tip. marsicana di V. Magagnini, 1872.
- Kehr, Paul Fridolin (1908). Italia pontificia. vol. IV. Berlin 1909. pp. 239–251. (in Latin)
- Melchiorre, Angelo (1985). "La Diocesi dei Marsi dopo il Concilio di Trento," (in Italian), in: Bullettino della Deputazione Abruzzese di Storia Patria 75 (1985), pp. 297- .
- Melchiorre, Angelo (1985b), Profilo storico della diocesi dei Marsi. (in Italian) Roma 1985.
- Schwartz, Gerhard (1907). Die Besetzung der Bistümer Reichsitaliens unter den sächsischen und salischen Kaisern: mit den Listen der Bischöfe, 951-1122. (in German) Leipzig: B.G. Teubner. pp. 281–284.
- Phoebonius, Mutius [Muzio Febonio] (1678), Historiae Marsorum libri tres: una cum eorundem episcoporum catalogo. (in Latin). Neapoli: apud Michaelem Monachum 1678.
- Ughelli, Ferdinando; Coleti, Niccolò (1717). Italia sacra sive De Episcopis Italiae, et insularum adjacentium (in Latin). Vol. Tomus primus (1) (editio secunda, aucta et emendata ed.). Venice: apud Sebastianum Coleti. pp. 882–915.
