= Diocese of Isernia-Venafro =

Roman Catholic diocese in Italy

Coordinates: 41.6000°N 14.2333°E

Diocese of Isernia-Venafro Dioecesis Aeserniensis-Venafrensis

Catholic
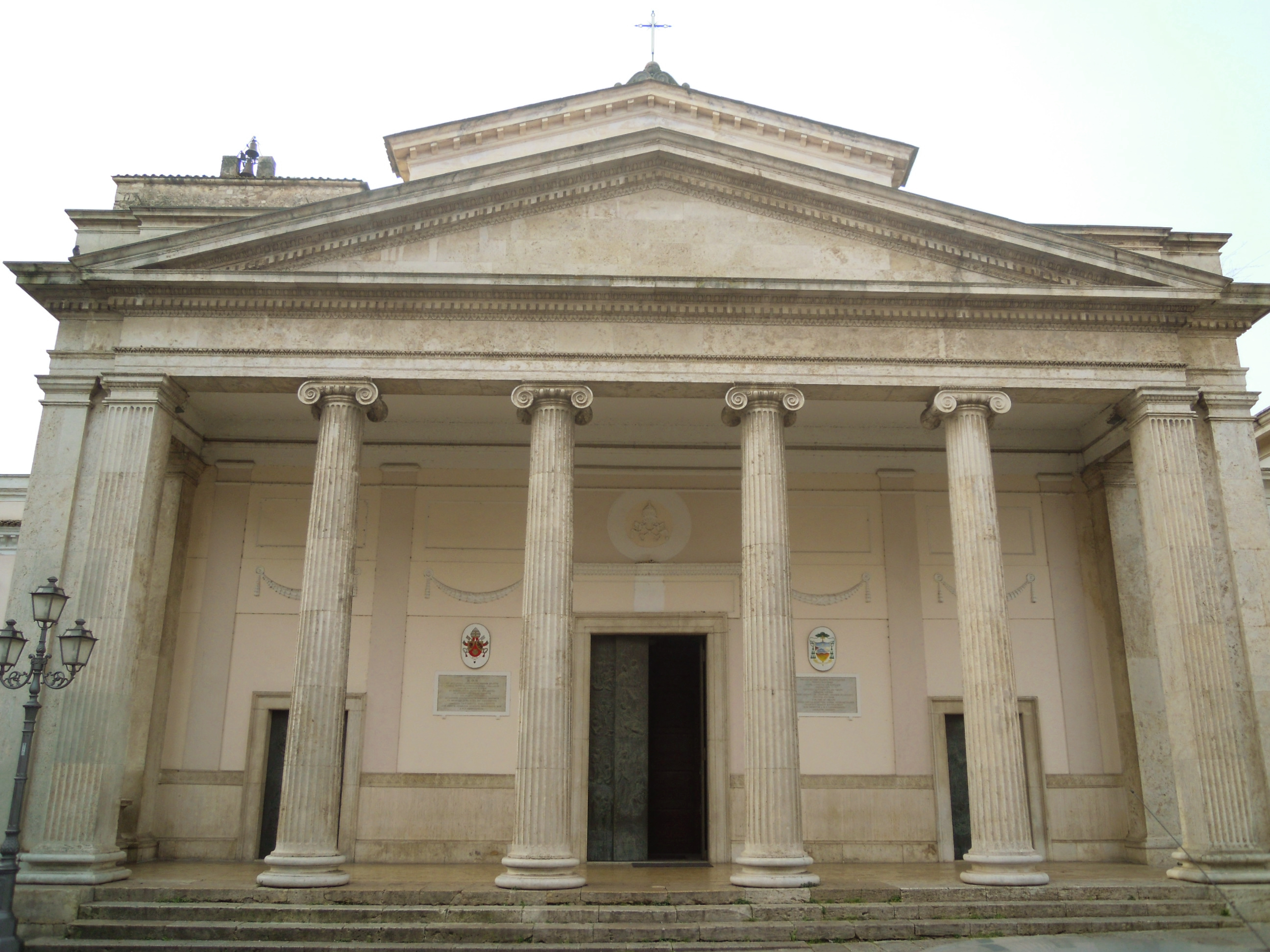
- Cathedral of Isernia

Location
- Country: Italy
- Ecclesiastical province: Campobasso-Boiano

Statistics
- Area: 740 km^{2} (290 sq mi)
- Population: Total; Catholics: (as of 2023); 62,500 (est.) ▼; 61,600 (guess) ▼
- Parishes: 48

Information
- Denomination: Catholic Church
- Rite: Roman Rite
- Established: 5th Century ?
- Cathedral: Cattedrale di S. Pietro Apostolo (Isernia)
- Co-cathedral: Concattedrale di S. Maria Assunta (Venafro)
- Secular priests: 35 (diocesan) ▼23 (Religious Orders) ▲10 Permanent Deacons

Current leadership
- Pope: Leo XIV
- Bishop: Camillo Cibotti

Website
- www.diocesiiserniavenafro.it

The Diocese of Isernia-Venafro (Latin: Dioecesis Aeserniensis-Venafrensis) is a Latin Church diocese of the Catholic Church in Molise. It is a suffragan of the archdiocese of Campobasso-Boiano. In 1852 the historic diocese of Isernia was combined with the diocese of Venafro, to form the diocese of Isernia e Venafro. The seat of the present bishop is Isernia Cathedral, while Venafro Cathedral has become a co-cathedral in the new diocese.

== History ==
The epoch of Bishop Benedict of Isernia, and indeed his very existence, is without any documentary evidence at all. It is even claimed that he had predecessors, beginning with Poltinus, who was consecrated a bishop by Saint Peter the Apostle himself. That the existence of the episcopal see in the fifth century is certain is likewise a doubtful proposition; each of the purported bishops has been assigned to other dioceses.

After the Lombard invasions, Isernia was the seat of a countship, founded by the Duke of Benevento. It was destroyed by the Saracens in the ninth century. In 847, the entire city of Isernia was destroyed by an earthquake, with great loss of life, including the bishop.

On 5 May 964, the Lombard princes, Pandulfus and Landulfus, granted the town of Isernia with all its territories to Count Landulfus, at the plea of Bishop Ardericus. The grant recites the boundaries of the territory.

In 1199 it was sacked by Markward von Annweiler, the vicar of the deceased Emperor Henry VI. On 5 December 1456, another great earthquake caused heavy damage and deaths in the area of Isernia. In 1688, both cities were damaged, though apparently the greatest damage was the loss of the church of the Carmelites in Venafro. In 1805, Isernia was struck by a severe earthquake, which ruined the ancient cathedral.

In 1032 the Diocese of Venafro (The town was formerly the site of Roman country residences) was united to Isernia, and in 1230 it was again separated.

On 12 November 1192, the city of Venafro was sacked and burned by the German troops of the Emperor Henry VI, led by Duke Bertold. Bishop Gentile was forced to flee. He sought refuge in Aversa, whose leaders persuaded him to become their bishop. The ecclesiastical leaders in Venafro and in Isernia immediately began to air various grievances against one another, which led to litigation. Numerous citations of the parties to appear before Cardinal Gerardo of S. Adriano, the judge whom Pope Celestine III had appointed, were ignored or put off to a later time. Exasperated, the cardinal authorized the chapter of the Cathedral at Venafro to proceed to elect their own bishop. The Chapter elected Johannes de Abner, but when the pope heard that they had chosen someone who was not even in Holy Orders, he voided the election. Finally, in 1195, he confirmed one R[ - - -] as the new bishop of Venafro. Since the absence of a bishop at Isernia was causing great detriment, Pope Celestine appointed R., the bishop-elect of Venafro, to be the bishop of Isernia as well, ordering the Chapter to obey R. as if they had elected him themselves.

=== Reorganization of the Kingdom of the Two Sicilies, 1818 ===
Following the extinction of the Napoleonic Kingdom of Italy, the Congress of Vienna authorized the restoration of the Papal States and the Kingdom of The Two Sicilies (Naples). Since the French occupation had seen the abolition of many Church institutions in the Kingdom, as well as the confiscation of much Church property and resources, it was imperative that Pope Pius VII and King Ferdinand IV reach agreement on restoration and restitution.

A concordat was finally signed on 16 February 1818, and ratified by Pius VII on 25 February 1818. Ferdinand issued the concordat as a law on 21 March 1818. The right of the king to nominate the candidate for a vacant bishopric was recognized, as in the Concordat of 1741, subject to papal confirmation (preconisation). On 27 June 1818, Pius VII issued the bull De Ulteriore, in which he reestablished the metropolitan archbishopric of Capua, and assigned as suffragan (subordinate) dioceses: Isernia, Calvi, Suessa, and Caserta. The diocese of Venafro was permanently suppressed, and united to the diocese of Isernia.

On 18 June 1852, in the bull "Sollicitudinem Animarum", Pope Pius IX the arrangement was changed. The diocese of Isernia and the revived diocese of Venafro were to be under the governance of one single bishop, aeque personaliter, to be called the diocese of Isernia e Venafro.

=== Post Vatican II changes ===
Following the Second Vatican Council, and in accordance with the norms laid out in the council's decree, Christus Dominus chapter 40, Pope Paul VI ordered a reorganization of the ecclesiastical provinces in southern Italy. His decree "Ad Apicem Spiritualis" of 21 August 1976 created a new episcopal conference in the region called "Molise", to be called "Boianensis-Campobassensis", with the archdiocese of Boiano-Campobasso, formerly directly subject to the Holy See, to be the Metropolitan; its suffragans were to be the dioceses of Trivento, Isernia e Venafra, and Thermulae e Larino. Pope Paul VI also ordered consultations among the members of the Congregation of Bishops in the Vatican Curia, the Italian Bishops Conference, and the various dioceses concerned, with regard to additional changes.

On 18 February 1984, the Vatican and the Italian State signed a new and revised concordat. Based on the revisions, a set of Normae was issued on 15 November 1984, which was accompanied in the next year, on 3 June 1985, by enabling legislation. According to the agreement, the practice of having one bishop govern two separate dioceses at the same time, aeque personaliter, was abolished. The Vatican continued consultations which had begun under Pope John XXIII for the merging of small dioceses, especially those with personnel and financial problems, into one combined diocese.

On 30 September 1986, Pope John Paul II ordered that the dioceses of Isernia and Venafro be merged into full union as one diocese with one bishop, with the Latin title Dioecesis Aeserniensis-Venafrensis. The seat of the diocese was to be in Isernia, and the cathedral of Isernia was to serve as the cathedral of the merged diocese. The cathedral in Venafro was to become a co-cathedral, and its cathedral Chapter was to be a Capitulum Concathedralis. There was to be only one diocesan Tribunal, in Isernia, and likewise one seminary, one College of Consultors, and one Priests' Council. The territory of the new diocese was to include the territory of the suppressed diocese of Venafro.

== Bishops ==
=== Diocese of Isernia ===
==== to 1379 ====
...

- [Anonymous] (d. 847)

...

- Odelgarius (attested 877)

...

- [Anonymous] (attested 943)

[Landus (Lando)] [(946)]
...

- Ardericus (attested 964–975)

...

- Gerardus (attested 1032)

...

- Petrus of Ravenna, O.S.B. (attested c. 1059)
- Raynaldus (attested 1170 – 1183)

...

- Gentile (attested 1192)

Sede vacante (1192 – 1195)

- [R - - -] (attested 1195)
- Darius (1207 – 1211)
- Theodorus
- Hugo (attested 1244)
- Nicolaus
- Henricus da S. Germano, O.Min. (1267 – 1276)
- Matthaeus (1276 – 1287?)
- Robertus
- Jacobus
- Petrus

Conradus Rampini (1330) Bishop-elect

- Henricus, O.F.M. (4 July 1330 - 1331)
- Guglielmo, O.Carm. (13 November 1331 - ?)
- Cristoforo (c. 1348 - ? )
- Filippo Gezza de Rufinis, O.P. (1362 - 1367)
- Paolo Francisci de' Lapi (22 dicembre 1367 - 1379)

==== from 1379 to 1600 ====
- Niccolò (II) (1379 - ?)
- Cristoforo Maroni (1387 – 1389)
- Domenico (1390 - 1402) Roman Obedience
- Andrea Serao (1402) Roman Obedience
- Antonio De Rossi (1402 - 1404)
- Niccolò (III), O.S.B. (14 May 1404 - ? )
- Bartolomeo di Pardo (28 January 1415 - ? )
- Giacomo de Monte Aquila (27 June 1418 - 1469)
- Carlo Setari (12 Jan 1470 – 1486 Died)
- Francesco Adami (10 Apr 1486 – 1497 Died)
- Costantino Castriota (2 Oct 1497 – 1500 Died)
- Giovanni Olivieri (8 Apr 1500 – 1510 Died)
- Massimo Bruni Corvino (30 Sep 1510 – 1522 Died)
- Christopher Numai, O.F.M. Obs. (1523 – 1524 Resigned)
- Antonio Numai (1524 – 1567 Resigned)
- Giovanni Battista Lomellino (1567 – 1599)
- Paolo De Curtis, C.R. (15 Mar 1600 – 1606 Resigned)
- Alessio Geromoaddi (24 Apr 1606 – 6 Apr 1611 Died)
- Marcantonio Genovesi (26 Sep 1611 – 7 Nov 1624 Died)
- Gian Gerolamo Campanili (27 Jan 1625 – 22 Jun 1626 Died)
- Diego Merino, O. Carm. (24 Aug 1626 – 1 Jan 1637 Died)
- Domenico Giordani, O.F.M. (17 Aug 1637 – 11 Feb 1640 Died)

==== from 1640 to 1861 ====
- Marcello Stella (26 Mar 1640 – 1642 Died)
- Gerolamo Mascambruno (11 Aug 1642 – May 1643 Died)
- Pietro Paolo de' Rustici, O.S.B. (14 Dec 1643 – 28 Oct 1652)
- Gerolamo Bollini, O.S.B. (9 Jun 1653 – 1660)
- Tiburzio Bollini, O.S.B. (28 May 1657 – 1662)
- Michelangelo Catalani, O.F.M. Conv. (20 Sep 1660 – 1672)
- Gerolamo Passarelli (30 Jan 1673 – 1689)
- Michele de Bologna, C.R. (6 Mar 1690 – 11 Dec 1698 Resigned)
- Biagio Terzi (22 Dec 1698 – May 1717 Died)
- Giovanni Saverio Lioni (20 Dec 1717 – 1730)
- Giuseppe Isidoro Persico (1731 – 1739)
- Giacinto Maria Jannucci (14 Dec 1739 – 26 Mar 1757)
- Erasmo Mastrilli, O.S.B. (26 Sep 1757 – Jan 1769)
- Michelangelo della Peruta (21 Aug 1769 – 30 Oct 1806)

Sede vacante (1806 – 1818)

- Michele Ruopoli (25 May 1818 – 24 Dec 1821)
- Salvatore Maria Pignattaro, O.P. (1823 – 1825 Resigned)
- Adeodato Gomez Cardosa (19 Dec 1825 – 4 Jul 1834 Died)

Sede vacante (1834 – 1837)

- Gennaro Saladino (19 May 1837 – 27 Apr 1861 Died)

=== Diocese of Isernia e Venafro ===
United: 18 June 1852 with Diocese of Venafro

- Antonio Izzo (23 Feb 1872 – 24 Oct 1879 Died)
- Agnello Renzullo (27 Feb 1880 – 23 Jun 1890 Appointed, Bishop of Nola)
- Francesco Paolo Carrano (4 Jun 1891 – 16 Jan 1893 Appointed, Archbishop of L'Aquila)
- Nicola Maria Merola (12 Jun 1893 – 24 Sep 1915 Died)
- Nicola Rotoli, O.F.M. (28 Mar 1916 – 27 Apr 1932 Died)
- Francesco Pietro Tesauri (13 Mar 1933 – 25 May 1939 Appointed, Archbishop of Lanciano e Ortona)
- Alberto Carinci (25 Mar 1940 – 28 Apr 1948 Appointed, Bishop of Boiano-Campobasso)
- Giovanni Lucato, S.D.B. (21 Jun 1948 – 1 May 1962 Died)
- Achille Palmerini (11 Jul 1962 – 7 Apr 1983 Retired)
- Ettore Di Filippo (7 Apr 1983 – 28 Oct 1989 Appointed, Archbishop of Campobasso-Boiano)

=== Diocese of Isernia-Venafro ===
On 30 September 1986, the diocese of Venafro was permanently suppressed.

- Ettore Di Filippo (30 September 1986 – 1989)
- Andrea Gemma, F.D.P. (7 Dec 1990 – 5 Aug 2006 Retired)
- Salvatore Visco (5 Apr 2007 – 2013)
- Camillo Cibotti (8 May 2014 – )

== See also ==
- Roman Catholic Diocese of Venafro
- Cappella San Donato, Venafro
- Catholic Church in Italy

== Bibliography ==
=== Episcopal lists ===
- Eubel, Conradus, ed. (1913). Hierarchia catholica, Tomus 1 (second ed.). Münster: Libreria Regensbergiana. (in Latin)
- Eubel, Conradus, ed. (1914). Hierarchia catholica, Tomus 2 (second ed.). Münster: Libreria Regensbergiana.
- Eubel, Conradus; Gulik, Guilelmus (1923). Hierarchia catholica, Tomus 3 (second ed.). Münster: Libreria Regensbergiana.
- Gams, Pius Bonifatius (1873). Series episcoporum Ecclesiae catholicae: quotquot innotuerunt a beato Petro apostolo (in Latin). Ratisbon: Typis et Sumptibus Georgii Josephi Manz.
- Gauchat, Patritius (Patrice) (1935). Hierarchia catholica IV (1592-1667). Münster: Libraria Regensbergiana.
- Ritzler, Remigius; Sefrin, Pirminus (1952). Hierarchia catholica medii et recentis aevi V (1667-1730). Patavii: Messagero di S. Antonio.
- Ritzler, Remigius; Sefrin, Pirminus (1958). Hierarchia catholica medii et recentis aevi VI (1730-1799). Patavii: Messagero di S. Antonio.
- Ritzler, Remigius; Sefrin, Pirminus (1968). Hierarchia Catholica medii et recentioris aevi (in Latin). Vol. VII (1800–1846). Monasterii: Libreria Regensburgiana.
- Remigius Ritzler; Pirminus Sefrin (1978). Hierarchia catholica Medii et recentioris aevi (in Latin). Vol. VIII (1846–1903). Il Messaggero di S. Antonio.
- Pięta, Zenon (2002). Hierarchia catholica medii et recentioris aevi (in Latin). Vol. IX (1903–1922). Padua: Messagero di San Antonio. ISBN 978-88-250-1000-8.

=== Studies ===
- Cappelletti, Giuseppe (1866). Le chiese d'Italia della loro origine sino ai nostri giorni (in Italian). Vol. vigesimo (20). Venezia: Giuseppe Antonelli. pp. 127–180.
- D'Avino, Vincenzo (1848). Cenni storici sulle chiese arcivescovili, vescovili, e prelatizie (nullius) del Regno delle Due Sicilie (in Italian). dalle stampe di Ranucci. pp. 271-284. [text by Giovanni Sannicola]
- Kehr, Paul Fridolin (1935). Italia pontificia. Vol. VIII: Regnum Normannorum — Campania. Berlin: Weidmann. (in Latin)
- Ughelli, Ferdinando; Coleti, Niccolo (1720). Italia sacra sive De episcopis Italiæ, et insularum adjacentium (in Latin). Vol. Tomus sextus (6). Venice: apud Sebastianum Coleti. pp. 366–405 (Isernia), 579–586 (Venafro).

==== External links ====
- Benigni, Umberto. "Isernia and Venafro." The Catholic Encyclopedia. Vol. 8. New York: Robert Appleton Company, 1910. Retrieved: 14 November 2022.
