= Tempio di San Martino, Chioggia =

Church building in Chioggia, Italy

Tempio di San Martino
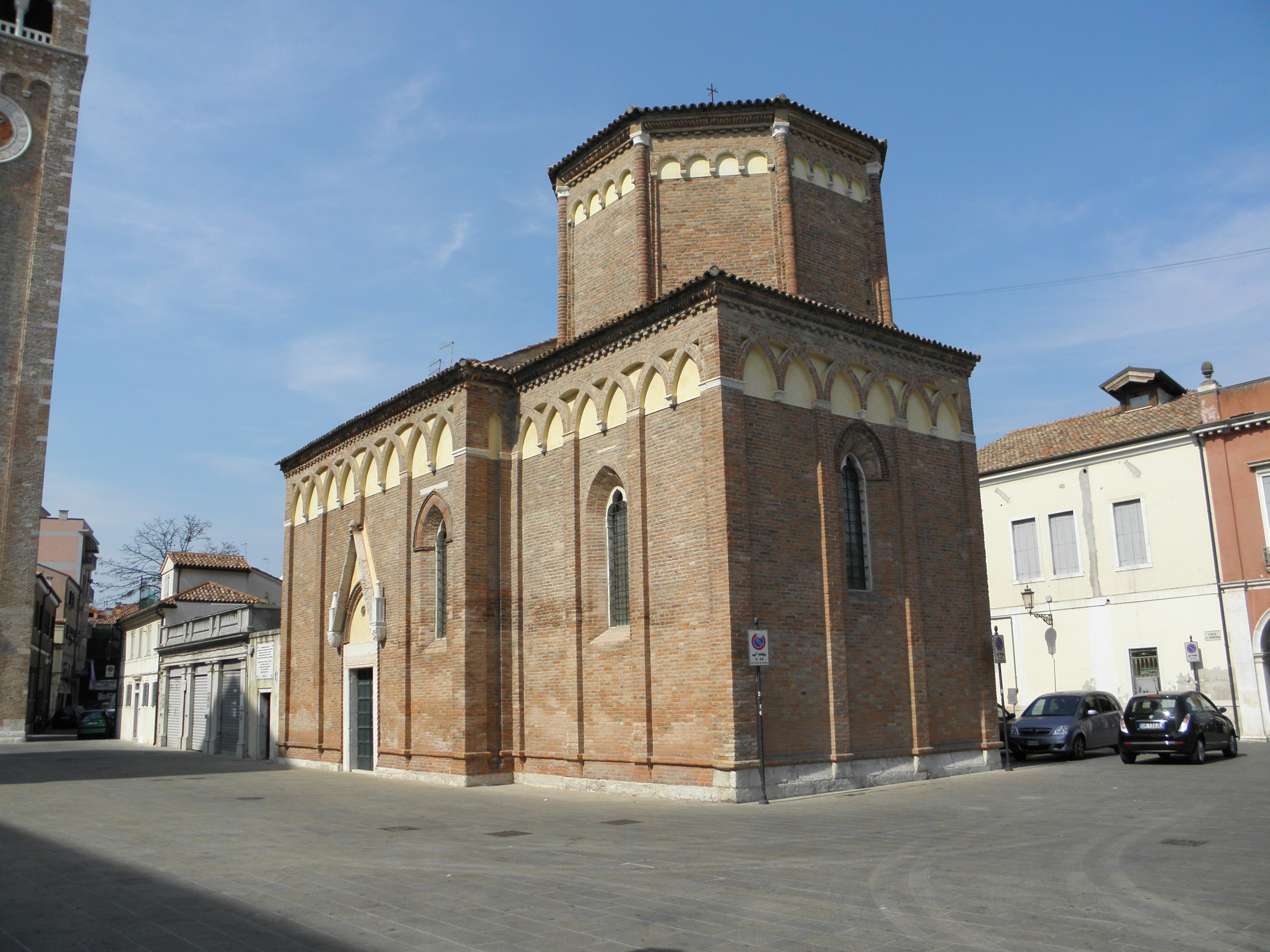
- The Temple of Saint Martino

Religion
- Affiliation: Catholic
- Province: Venice
- Region: Veneto
- Patron: Martin of Tours

Location
- Location: Chioggia, Venice, Italy
- State: Italy
- Interactive map of Tempio di San Martino
- Territory: Chioggia
- Coordinates: 45°13′02″N 12°16′39″E

Architecture
- Style: Gothic
- Founder: Francesco and Bartolomeo degli Orsi Carnelli
- Groundbreaking: 1394

The Tempio di San Martino , ("The Temple of Saint Martin") is a religious building that closes the Campo del Duomo of Chioggia on the north side, is a Catholic church located in Chioggia, in the province of Venice, Veneto, Italy.

== History ==
The building was wanted by ser Francesco and ser Bartolomeo degli Orsi Carnelli who, through their testamentary, they wanted to give a place of worship to the population of Chioggia Minor (Sottomarina), exiled in Chioggia Maior due to the interdiction of the Venetian Senate, who after the war against the Genoese had forbidden the construction of any building outside the town walls. The construction of this temple also took place thanks to the assets of the churches destroyed during the conflict completed in 1381. In fact it was built in 1394–95 in the Campo of Duomo and was named after the saints Martino, Matteo apostle and Antonio abate, symbolically collecting the devotions of the churches of Chioggia Minor, destroyed by the Genoese.

The Church of Saint Martino in Sottomarina will be rebuilt, with the approbation of the Serenissima, in 1712 after the repopulation of the coastal area.

From 1726 to 1749 this temple housed a branch of the religious congregation of the Filippiniborning in Chioggia, which then built its own church in Riva Vena in 1772. Subsequently, the temple of San Martino was temporarily ceded to the community of the Church of Saint Giacomo, which here in turn made the reconstruction work of his own church possible.

After the restorations of the early twentieth century, which involved this temple and the adjacent Church of Saints Peter and Paul, both designed by the Chioggia architect Aristide Naccari, and the most recent completed in 2002, the church is practically used for temporary exhibitions, except during the period of restoration of the Church of San Francesco inside the walls in which the liturgical functions were celebrated again inside the temple during the winter only on weekdays together with daily Eucharistic adoration. Following the completion of the restoration works of the Church of Saint Francesco, celebrations were no longer held, returning to become the site of temporary exhibitions.

== Outside ==
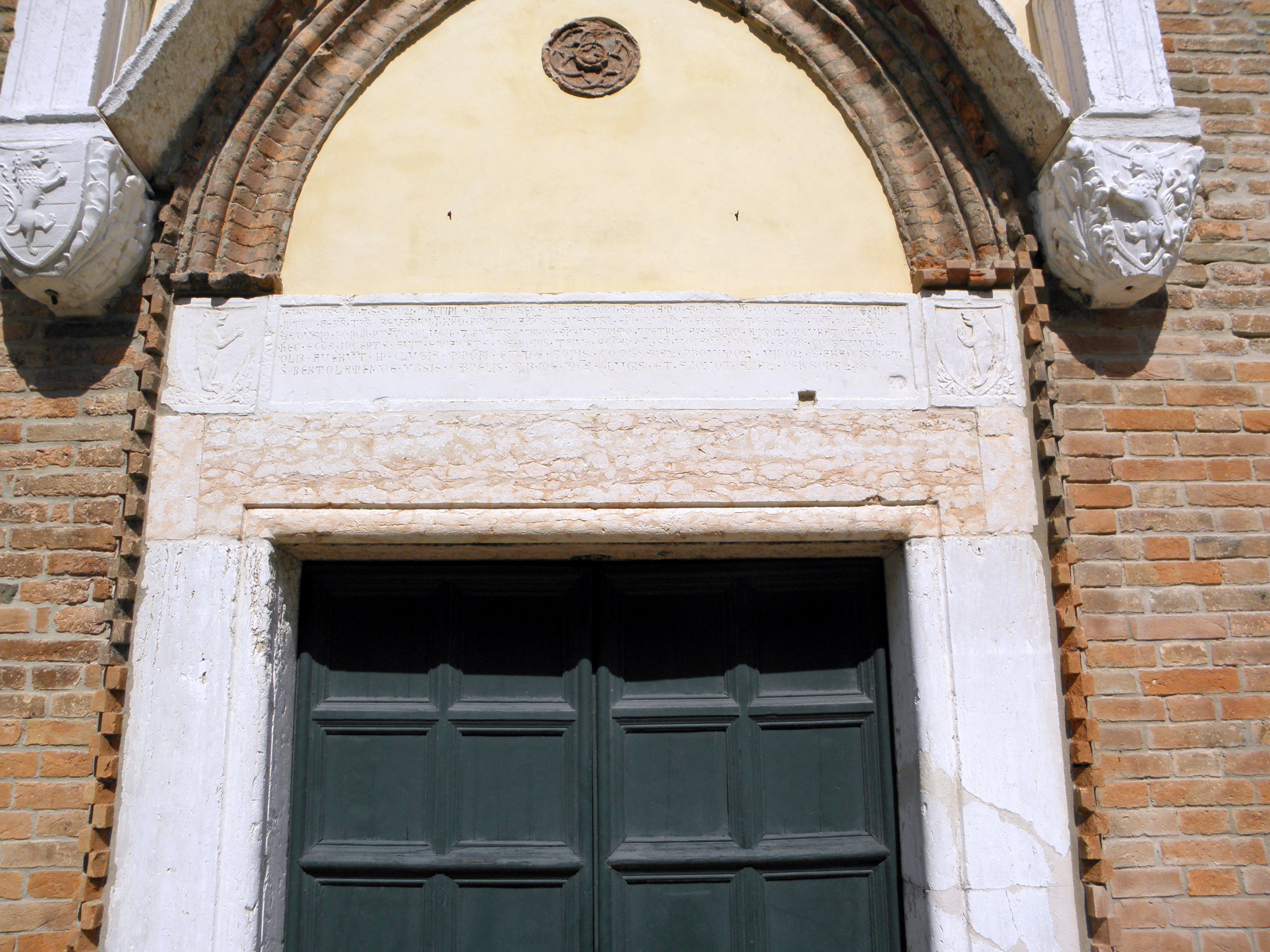
The high altar

The entrance to the church, on the south, shows the origins of the temple in the architrave, with the coats of arms of the city and of the Orsi Carnelli family, from which starts a vertical pyramid-shaped tympanum.

The external walls are adorned with pilasters which, in the upper part, form small pointed arches all crowned with worked bricks.

The bell tower that rises to the west was demolished in the mid-twentieth century.

== Inside ==
The interior of the church is bare and has a rectangular plan 10 meters wide, 16 meters long, reaching a height of 12.60 meters on the dome. The large triumphal arch, from which a painted crucifix hangs, divides the choir part from the rest of the church.
