= Pinacoteca Giovanni Morscio =

- Established: 1970; 56 years ago
- Website: www.visitdolceacqua.it/la-pinacoteca-e-il-centro-culturale/

The Pinacoteca Giovanni Morscio is an Italian museum, located in Dolceacqua. The Pinacoteca is located in the Palazzo Luigina Garoscio.

== History ==
The museum was founded in 1970, thanks to a donation by the local painter Giovanni Morscio of paintings of him and other Italian and French painters of his time.

Morscio (1887-1972) was mainly devoted to still life and frescos; he was active in Liguria and Nice, and he exhibited at the Salon des Indépendants in 1930 and practiced in France also as a gallery owner.

The collection was enlarged by the municipal administration in the eighties. After an initial location in the former town hall, the museum was transferred to the Palazzo Luigina Garoscio.

== Collection ==
The original collection is focused on a selection of works by Morscio and some Italian and French painters of his time: Eloi Noël Bouvard, Mario Ameglio, Eugenio Bonivento, Cyrano Castelfranchi, Georges Chappuis, Gaston Cirmeuse, Yves Diey, Robert Duflos, Charley Garry, Maurice Martin, Maurice Louis Monnot, Fernando Pelosini, Alberto Rossi, André Salomon Le Tropezien.

After Morscio's death collection has been enlarged with paintings by Achille Cabiati, Marcello Cammi, Franco Giglio and Mario Raimondo.
