= Monnot =

Monnot can refer to:

== People ==
- John E. Monnot (1865–1910), American politician from Ohio
- Marguerite Monnot (1903 - 1961), French songwriter and composer.
- Pierre-Étienne Monnot (1657 - 1733), French sculptor.
- Maurice Louis Monnot (1869 - 1937), French painter.

== Other ==
- Monnot Street in Beirut, Lebanon.
