= Maurice Monnot =

Maurice Monnot may refer to:

- Maurice Monnot (sailor), French Olympic sailor
- Maurice Louis Monnot (1869–1937), French painter
