= Bonivento =

Bonivento is an Italian surname. Notable people with the surname include:

- Claudio Bonivento (born 1950), Italian film producer and director
- Eugenio Bonivento (1880–1956), Italian painter
- Renzo Bonivento (1902–1963), Italian equestrian
