= Alberto Rossi =

Alberto Rossi may refer to:

- Alberto Rossi (painter) (1858–1936), Italian painter
- Alberto De Rossi (born 1957), Italian football manager and footballer
- Alberto Lorenzelli Rossi (born 1953), Argentina-born priest of the Catholic Church
- Alberto Rossi (born 1959), Italian sailor, multiple world champion

== See also ==
- Bert Rossi (Roberto Alberto Rossi (1922–2017), British-Italian gangster
- Carlo Alberto Rossi (1921–2010) Italian composer and record producer
- Paolo Alberto Rossi (1887–1969), Italian diplomat
