= Basilica minore di San Giacomo Apostolo, Chioggia =

Church building in Chioggia, Italy

Basilica minore di San Giacomo Apostolo
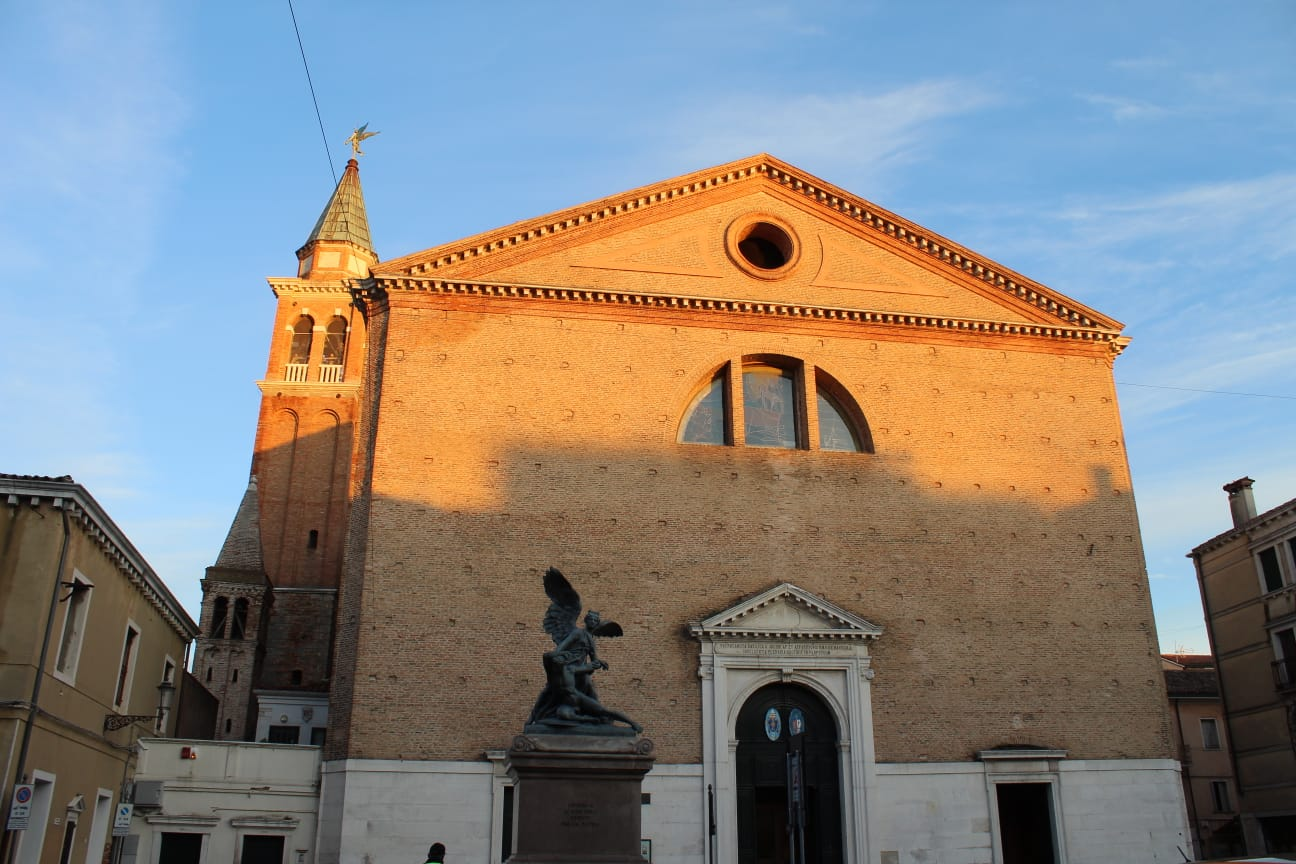
- Minor Basilica of the San Giacomo Apostolo

Religion
- Affiliation: Catholic
- Province: Venice
- Region: Veneto
- Patron: James the Less

Location
- Location: Chioggia, Venice, Italy
- State: Italy
- Interactive map of Basilica minore di San Giacomo Apostolo
- Territory: Chioggia
- Coordinates: 45°13′09″N 12°16′45″E

Architecture
- Groundbreaking: 1742

The Basilica minore di San Giacomo Apostolo ('Minor Basilica of San Giacomo Apostolo') is a religious building in Chioggia that overlooks on the main square of the city, is a Catholic church located in Chioggia, in the province of Venice, Veneto, Italy.
This church elevated to minor pontifical basilica with the title of Blessed Virgin of the Navicella by Pope Pius X in 1906, it is the second largest church in the historic center of Chioggia immediately after the cathedral.

== History ==
Before the church, there already existed a temple dating back to the 11th century, always dedicated to San Giacomo, which the Clodiense historian Pietro Morari, in his manuscript "The history of Chioggia" of 1637, describes as austere and low, divided into three naves by brick columns; through this description Aristide Naccari drew a graphic reconstruction.

The church was built on the previous one, after the collapse of the apse on the night between 24 and 25 November 1741. The construction began after the cathedral factory approved the project of the Venetian Pietro Pelle in 1742, who also worked at the same time on the reconstruction of the church of San Domenico also in Chioggia; subsequently the project was finished by his nephew, Domenico Pelle.

The church was the chaplaincy of the Cathedral and therefore it was subject to its economic jurisdiction, but being in a central position in the city, near to the homes of the highest class of the population, it could easily have financial autonomy.

On 15 November 1806 the relics of the Madonna della Navicella were transferred here, from the sanctuary of the same name in Sottomarina, which was transformed into a barracks by the Austrian ruler at the end of the 18th century. In 1859 the same Marian relics were honored through the coronation, carried out by the bishop of Chioggia Jacopo De Foretti, delegated by the papal bull of Pope Pius X. From 1989 to 1992, while the cathedral was being restored, the church of San Giacomo was used as a cathedral church, hosting solemn bishop ceremonies and the relics of the patron saints Felice and Fortunato.

A monument to the fallen was erected in 1923 front of the church. The winged victory bronze sculpture by Domenico Trentacoste.

== Description Inside ==
The interior of the church has a rectangular plan, 25 meters wide, 35 meters long and 25 meters high. It is adorned with several altars, arranged counterclockwise as follows:

- Altar of the Guardian Angel decorated with an altarpiece painted by Marinetti and a statue of Saint Rita;
- Altar of San Giuseppe with a statue of the saint, flanked by the statues of saints Rita and Lucia;
- Altar of Saints Sebastiano and Rocco, with an ancient altarpiece depicting the two saints and a panel with the face of the Madonna taken from a fresco found in Palazzo Granaio in Chioggia;
- Altar with the Baptistery adorned with a statue of Christ by Luigi Tomaz;
- Main altar designed by Aristide Naccari and executed by Pietro Longo at the beginning of the twentieth century in Carrara marble, which frames the icon and the plinth (relics of the Madonna della Navicella). The protective silver frames are the work of the goldsmith Giovanni Cristofoli, designed by the architect Lodovico Cadorin. The monumental altar is crowned by an angel with open arms, while centrally there is Pietro Longo at the beginning of the twentieth century in Carrara marble, which frames the icon and the plinth (relics of the Madonna della Navicella). The protective silver frames are the work of the goldsmith Giovanni Cristofoli, designed by the architect Lodovico Cadorin. The monumental altar is crowned by an angel with open arms, while centrally there is the statue of San Giacomo; on the sides are the city patrons Felice and Fortunato in armour. Finally, in the two niches, the statues of King David and the prophet Isaiah;
- Altar of the Blessed Sacrament in neoclassical style with golden mosaic decorations;
- Altar of San Giuliano with related altarpiece;
- Altar of the Souls of Purgatory, with the statues from the left of Saint Martha, Saint Mary Magdalene and Saint Francis of Paola;
- Altar of relics with a Gothic-style reliquary;

Near the entrance there is the oval canvas (300 x 180 cm), representing San Giacomo by Giovanni Carlo Bevilacq

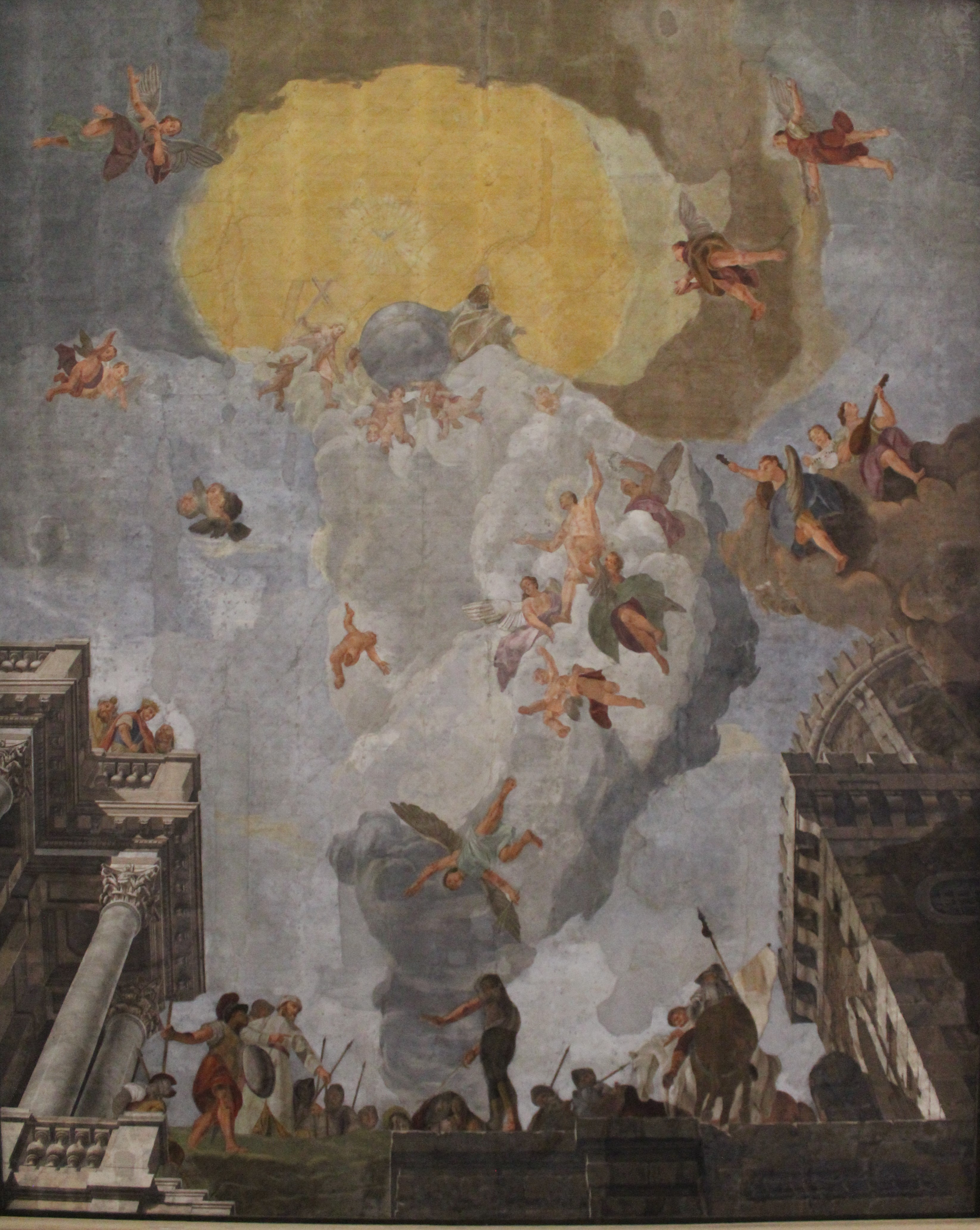
Ceiling fresco: Martyrdom and Glory of Saint James by Antonio Marinetti

== Frescoes ==
On the ceiling, the martyrdom and glorification of Saint James are represented in a 223 square meter fresco. The work was performed by the brothers Alessandro and Romualdo Mauri from Vicenza and by Antonio Marinetti from Chioggia; the first represented the moment of martyrdom (in the lowest part), the second, the saint's ascension towards Heaven.

Above the main altar there is a lunette depicting the Holy Mary, who intervenes to save the city of Chioggia from divine punishment. On the right, the apparition of the Madonna to Baldissera Zalon, which according to tradition occurred in 1508; on the left the Coronation of the Madonna. The ceiling of the choir is decorated with five medallions depicting God the Father (in the centre), with Saint Benedict, Saint Thomas Aquinas, Saint Alfonso De' Liguori, Saint Francis de Sales.

== Organ ==
Above the portal, on the counter-facade, is the mechanical organ installed by Gaetano Callido in 1793.

== Ex-voto ==
The church preserves on the northern wall a large number of 19th century votive offerings, called 'tolèle' in the local dialect. These are painted tablets, which were commissioned from local painters by those who had received a divine grace. The scenes usually depict shipwrecks with fishermen invoking the Madonna della Navicella. Adjacent to the presbytery, inside glass cases, votive offerings of late sixteenth or seventeenth century origin are preserved, with scenes embossed on silver sheets.

== Bell Tower ==
The bell tower, built at the end of the nineteenth century based on a design by Aristide Naccari, goes from 18.90 meters to 37.50. A wind vane angel has been positioned on the top; the old low tower took on a slender shape towards the sky, eclipsing the adjacent bell tower of the oratory of the Battuti of the Santissima Trinità.
