= Palazzo Municipale of Chioggia =

Town hall of Chioggia, Italy

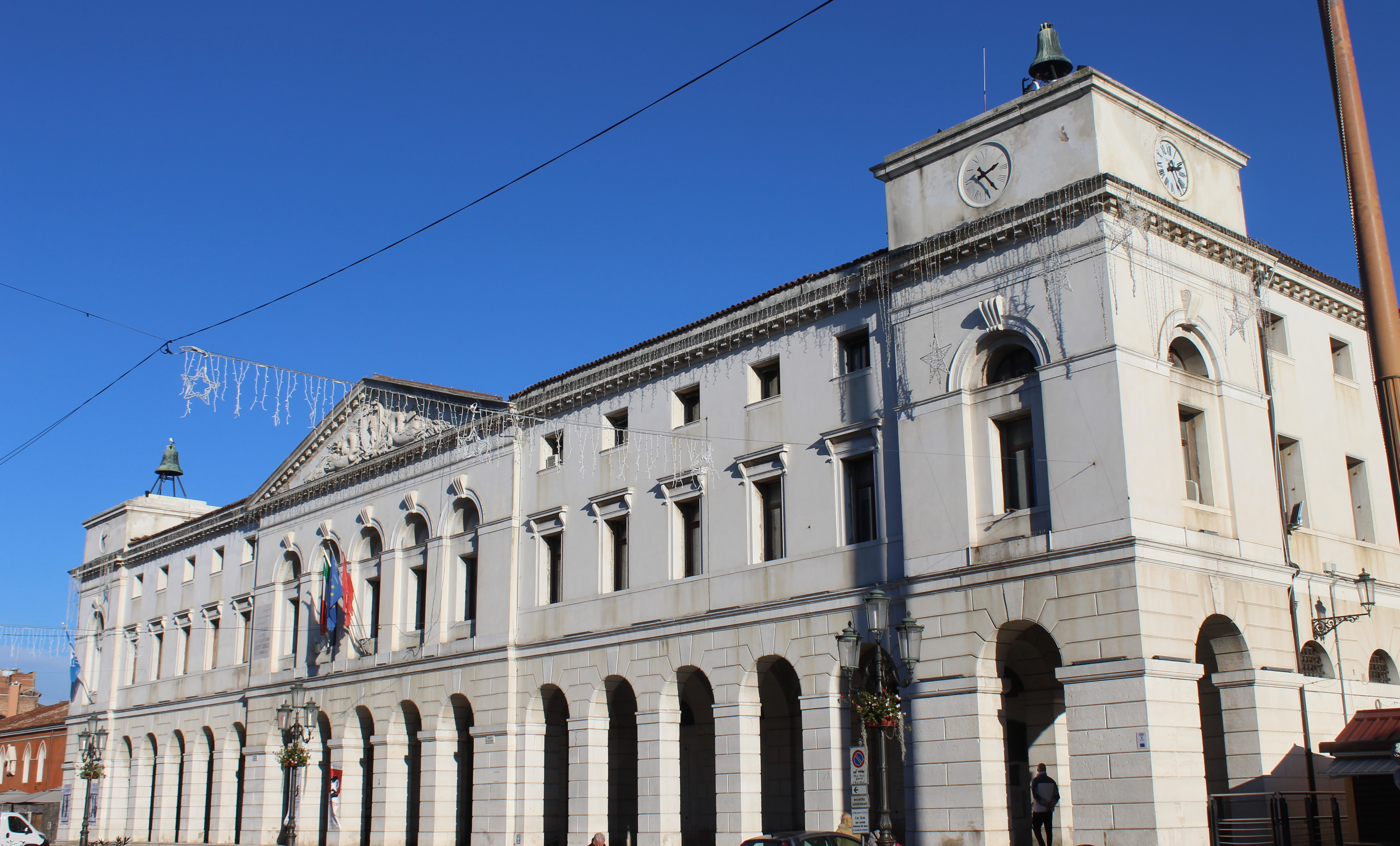
- Front of the Town Hall
- Interactive map of the Palazzo Municipale of Chioggia area

General information
- Type: City hall
- Architectural style: Neoclassical
- Location: Chioggia, Italy
- Coordinates: 45.220036°N 12.279287°E
- Completed: 1847

Design and construction
- Architect: De Paoli

The Palazzo Municipale is the Town Hall of Chioggia, located on Corso del Popolo, the main street of the Venetian city.

== History ==
The construction of the building, designed in 1828 by the engineer De Paoli, began in October 1839 in the same place where the Praetorian Palace had previously stood. The previous building, was built in 1228, it was demolished after a fire that broke out in 1817.

The balustrade of the external staircase has survived from that ancient building, which now adorns the garden of the episcope on the southern side of the Cathedral of Chioggia and the clock of the civic tower, transported to the bell tower of the Church of St. Andrew. It is one of the oldest still functioning tower clocks in the world.

Like the previous one, the current Town Hall was also used as a prison.

== Description ==
The big structure is built in a neoclassical style and it stands in a porch, raised from street level by five steps in Istrian stone.

In the central gable there is the emblem of the city flanked by the spade and the trident, symbol of agriculture and fisheries.

In the turrets on the sides you can see, in addition to the clocks, two bells; the one to the south is from 1790 while the one to the north is from 1855.

== Courtyards ==
The complex has three internal courtyards adorned with well curbs, the central one was built in 1768 and comes from the nearby convent of the Fathers Filippini, with the emblem of the religious congregation.

== Interior ==
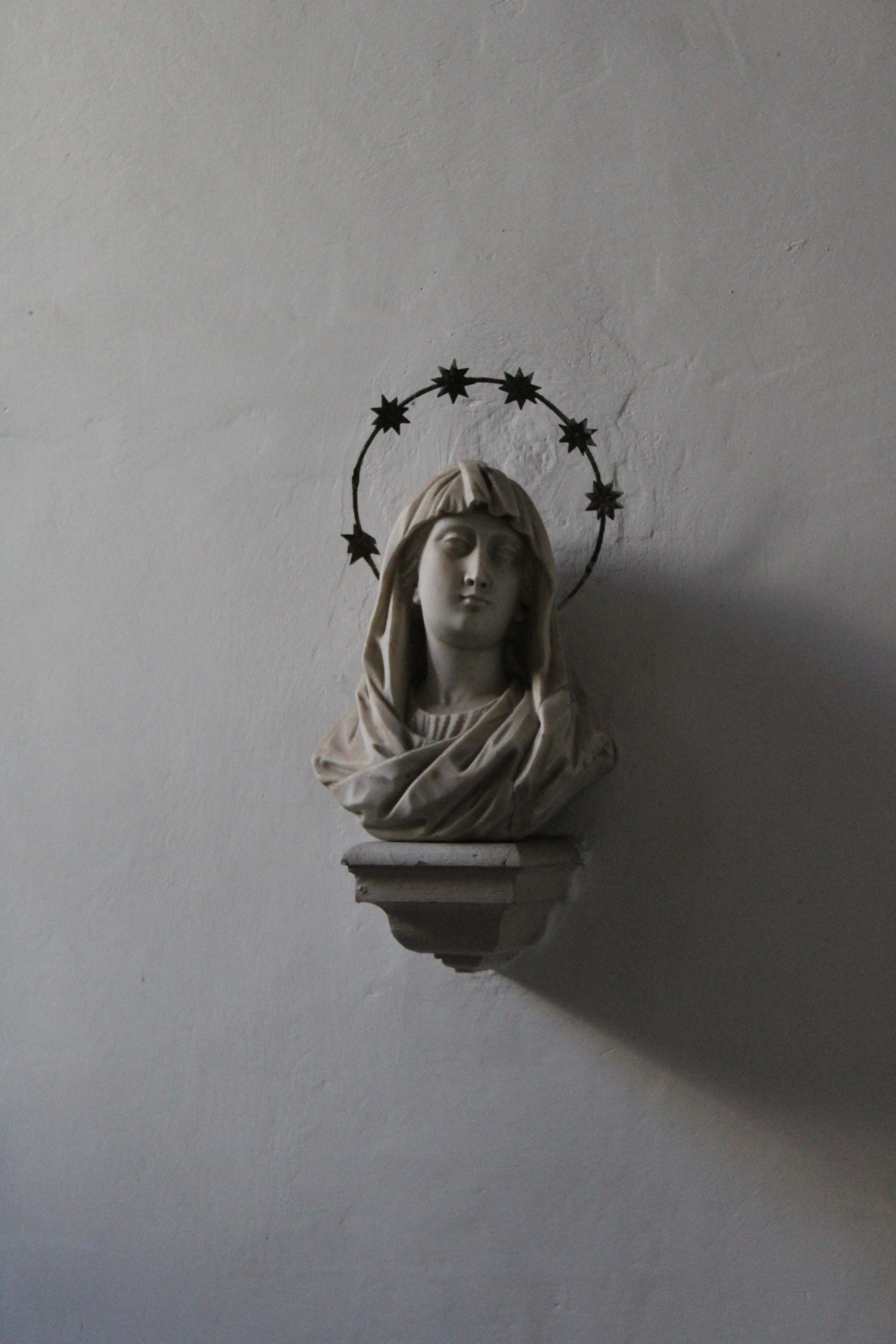
Bust of the Virgin Mary by Antonio Bonazza

At the center of the main staircase there is the bust of the Virgin Mary attributed to Antonio Bonazza, also from the convent of the Fathers Filippini.

The council hall (already the reception hall) houses some works of art:

- The large painting with The Last Supper by Antonio Vassilacchi from the Church of Santa Croce in Cividale di Belluno;
- the bust of Vittorio Emanuele II by Aristide Naccari;
- the bust of Eleonora Duse and Giuseppe Veronese sculpted by Rebesco Francesco, in the 1950.

== Commemorative plaques ==
Numerous commemorative plaques of historical characters and events are affixed in the portico; in the central courtyard there is the oldest datable to the 1st century after Christ, coming from the Torre di Bebbe in the locality of Ca' Pasqua.

== Flagpole ==
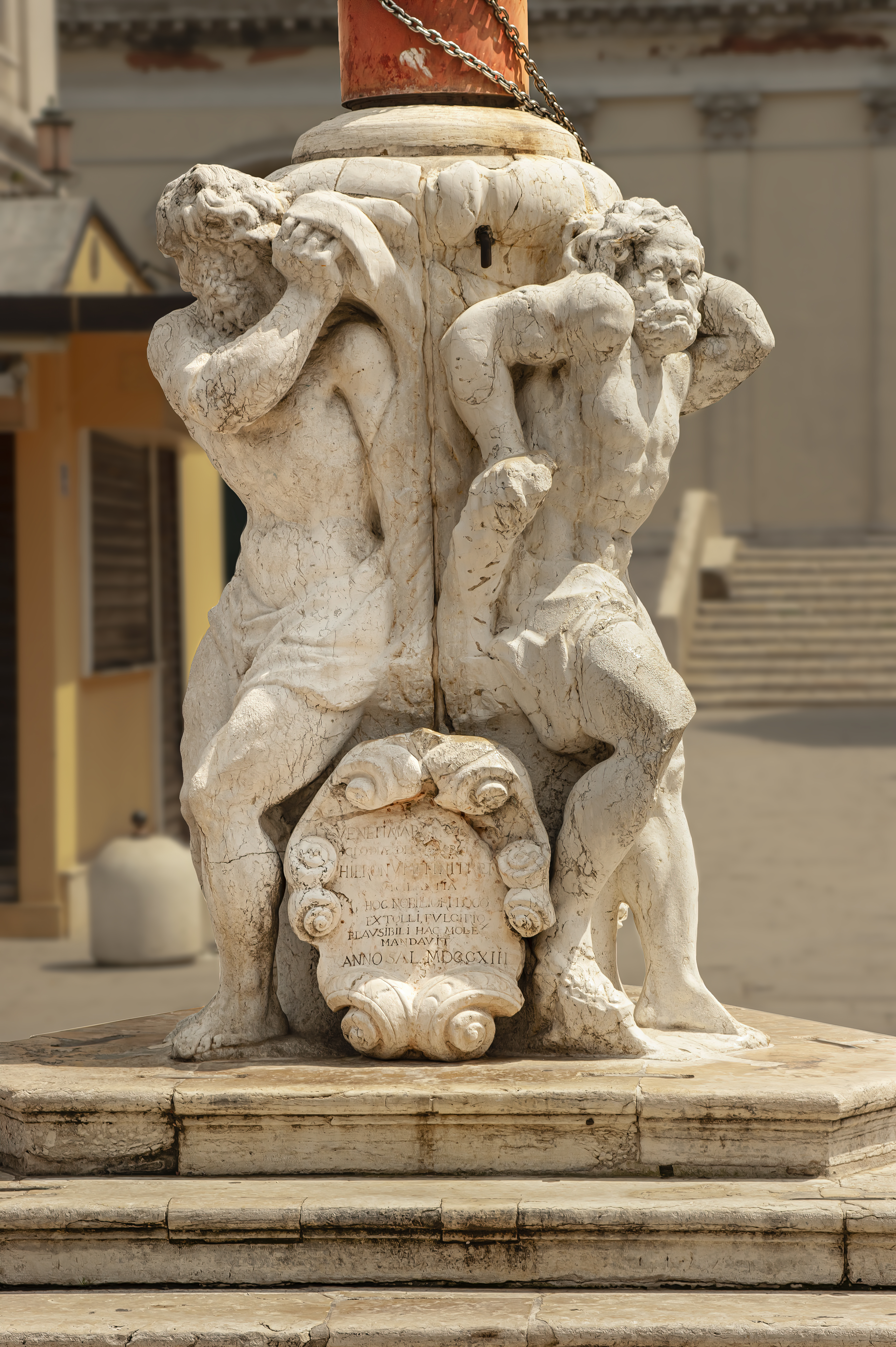
Flagpole

The marble base of the flagpole was built in 1713 by the sculptor Gioseffo Zeminiani.
Under the telamons that support the rod there is this inscription:

Inscription	Translation
«VENETI MARCI SIGNUM CLODIAE DECUS URBIS HIERONYMI FINI PRAETORIS VIGILANTIA HOC NOBILIORI LOCO EXTOLLI FULCIRIQUE PLAUSIBILI HAC MOLE MANDAVIT. ANN(O) SALUT(IS) MDCCXIII.»	At the vigilant concern of the mayor, Girolamo Fini wanted the Venetian banner of San Marco, honor of the city of Chioggia, to flutter in this eminent place and be supported by this magnificent support. Year of Salvation 1713.
