= Chiesa dei Santi Apostoli Pietro e Paolo, Chioggia =

Church building in Chioggia, Italy

Chiesa dei Santi Apostoli Pietro e Paolo
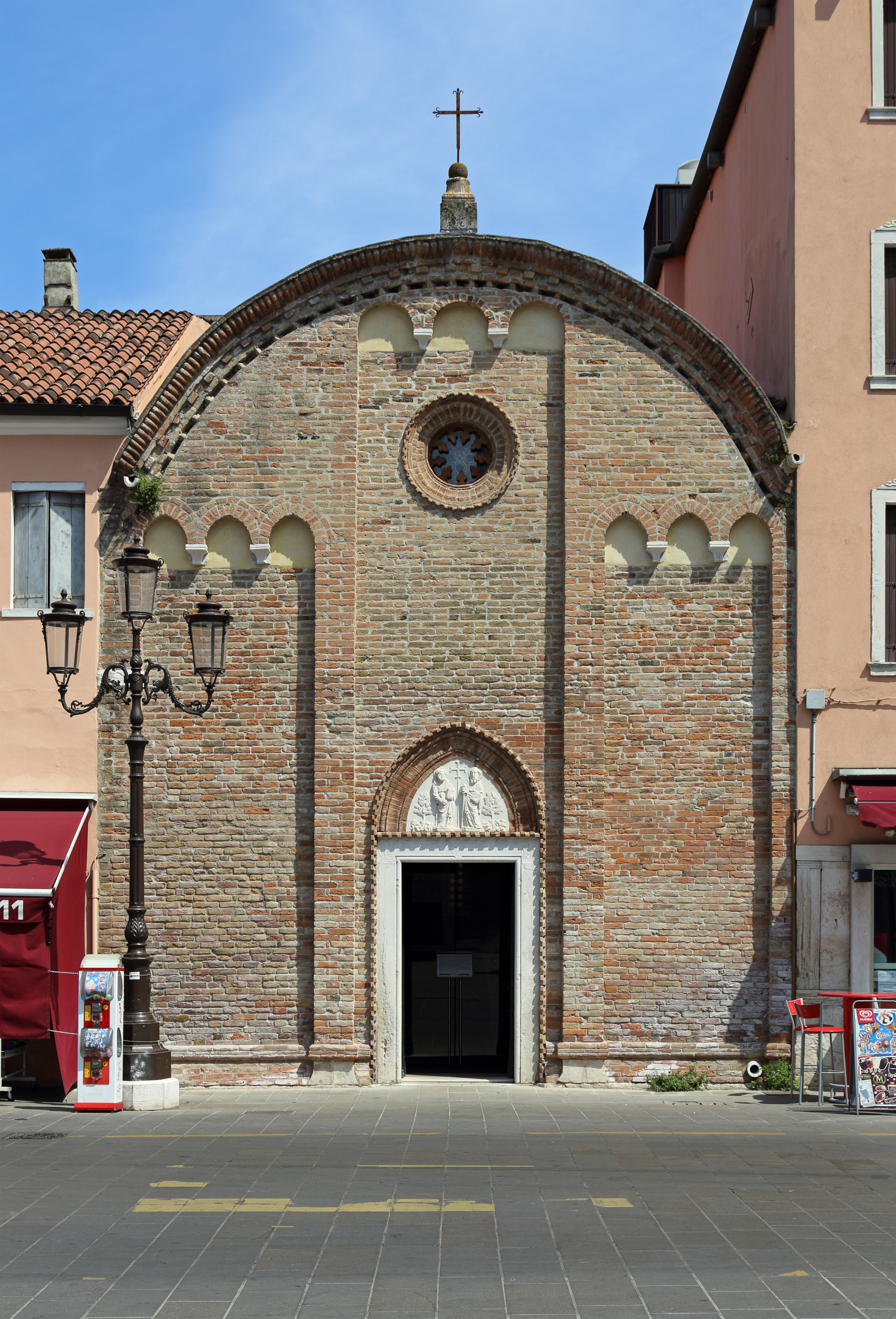
- The façade of the Church of the Holy Apostles Peter and Paul

Religion
- Affiliation: Catholic
- Province: Venice
- Region: Veneto
- Patron: Saint Peter, Saint Paul

Location
- Location: Chioggia, Venice, Italy
- State: Italy
- Interactive map of Chiesa dei Santi Apostoli Pietro e Paolo
- Territory: Chioggia
- Coordinates: 45°13′02″N 12°16′41″E

Architecture
- Style: Gothic
- Founder: Pietro Mazzagallo
- Groundbreaking: 1431-1432

The Chiesa dei Santi Apostoli Pietro e Paolo ("Church of the Holy Apostles Peter and Paul"), also called San Pieretto by the local population due to its small size, located on the east side of the Campo del Duomo, is a Catholic church in Chioggia, in the province of Venice, Veneto, Italy.

== History ==
The construction of this building was commissioned by Pietro Mazzagallo in his will, dating back to 1386, as is partly engraved on the entrance architrave, where it was also requested that mass be celebrated for the deceased and his relatives every day. It was completed between 1431 and 1432.

Between 1525 and 1528 the Confraternita dei Battuti of the Santissima Trinità found a temporary seat here until the Confraternita moved to the Church of the Santissima Trinità at the Palazzo Pretorio.

Between the 1600s and 1700s it first became a singing school and then a temporary seat for the priests belonging to the Oratory of Saint Philip Neri, until the completion of their church in Riva Vena.

After the fall of the Republic of Venice in 1797, the little church was confiscated by the occupying forces (first French and then Austrian), who converted it into a gunnery school, placing inside a cannon on a chariot, and also used it as a stable for horses. To do this, the entrance was enlarged and two windows were inserted in the façade.

At the beginning of the 1900s the church was bought by the Municipality of Chioggia, specifically by the Military Engineers, who restored the façade in 1921 thanks to previous studies by the local historian Aristide Naccari.

In 1941, after an exchange with the Church of San Nicolò (currently an auditorium), which passed to the Municipality, San Pieretto became the property of the cathedral chapter.

After the last restoration (between 2011 and 2013), Bishop Adriano Tessarollo decided to dedicate this chapel to the Adoration of the Crucifix.

== Description ==
=== Exterior ===
Only the west front and the back of the church are visible, because the side walls to the north and south are covered by houses built after the construction of the church.

The façade with a semicircular roofline is marked by three vertical bands each terminating in three pointed arches, with a small central rose window. The entrance portal in Carrara marble (engraved with the origin of the monument and the coats of arms of the Mazzagallo family and the town of Chioggia) is surmounted by a bas-relief of Saints Peter and Paul.

=== Interior ===
The interior of the church, which has a rectangular floor plan, is 7 meters wide by 15 meters long, reaching 12 meters in height under the semicircular dome. The large arch that divides the choir from the rest of the church rests on marble capitals decorated with leaves. The altar consists of a medieval well head or puteal previously kept in the seminary, surmounted by a glass altar table.

The 17th-century Carrara marble tabernacle (located on the south wall of the choir) is adorned with cherubs and instruments of the Passion in relief over frescoed marble. A 17th-century crucifix hangs from the ceiling (3.50 x 2.30 m).
