= Chioggia =

Comune in Veneto, Italy

Chioggia Cioxa (Venetian)
- Comune
- Città di Chioggia
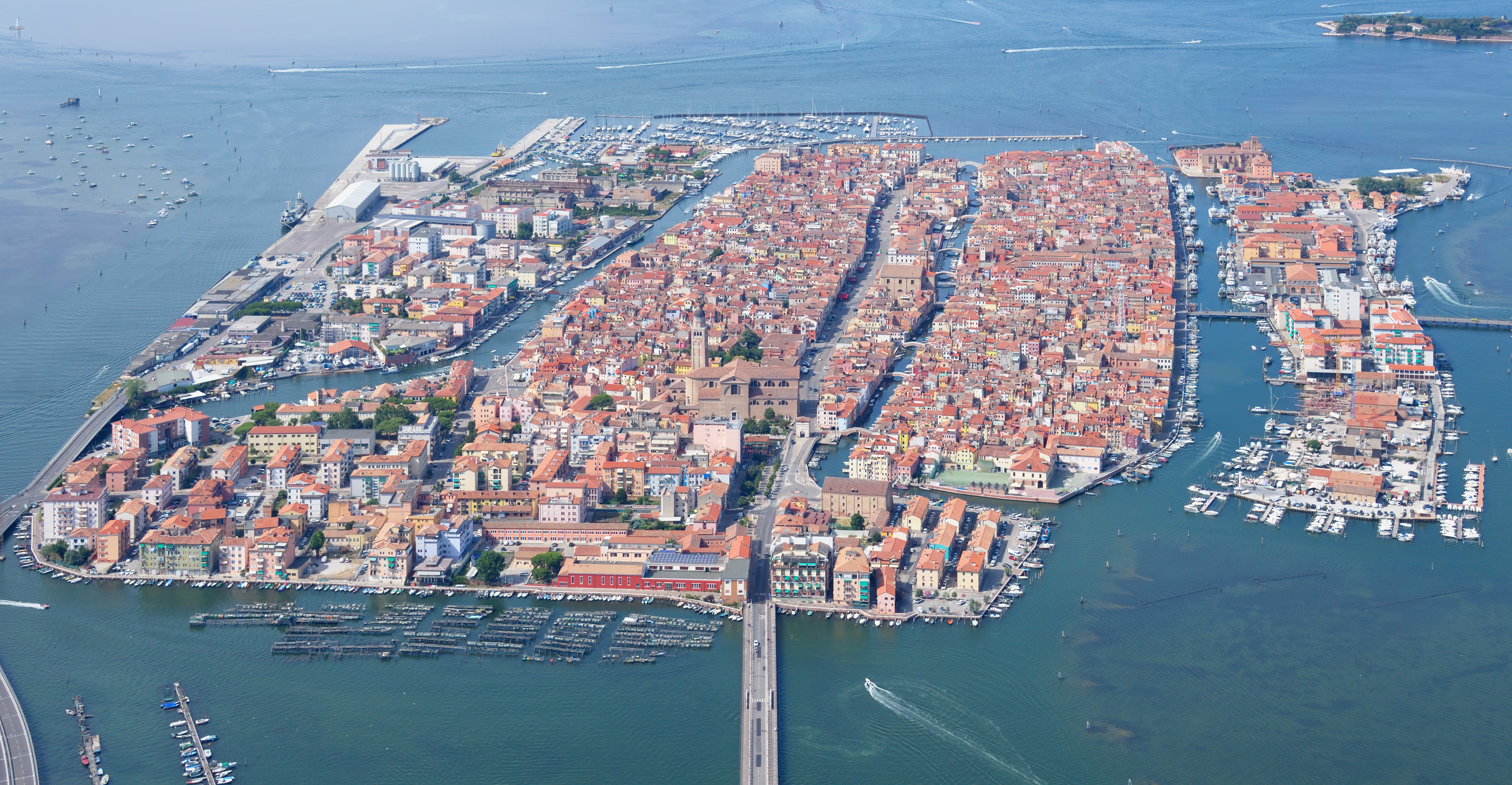

- Flag Coat of arms

- Chioggia within the Metropolitan City of Venice

- Location within Italy Location within Veneto
- Coordinates: 45°13′11″N 12°16′44″E
- Country: Italy
- Region: Veneto
- Metropolitan city: Venice (VE)
- Frazioni: Borgo San Giovanni, Brondolo, Cà Bianca, Cà Lino, Cavanella d'Adige, Isolaverde, Sant'Anna, Sottomarina, Valli Di Chioggia

Government
  - Mayor: Mauro Armelao

Area
  - Total: 185 km^{2} (71 sq mi)
- Elevation: 2 m (6.6 ft)

Population (31 July 2015)
  - Total: 49,744
  - Density: 269/km^{2} (696/sq mi)
- Demonym: Chioggiotti or Clodiensi
- Time zone: UTC+1 (CET)
  - Summer (DST): UTC+2 (CEST)
- Postal code: 30015
- Dialing code: 041
- Patron saint: San Felice and San Fortunato
- Saint day: 11 June
- Website: Official website

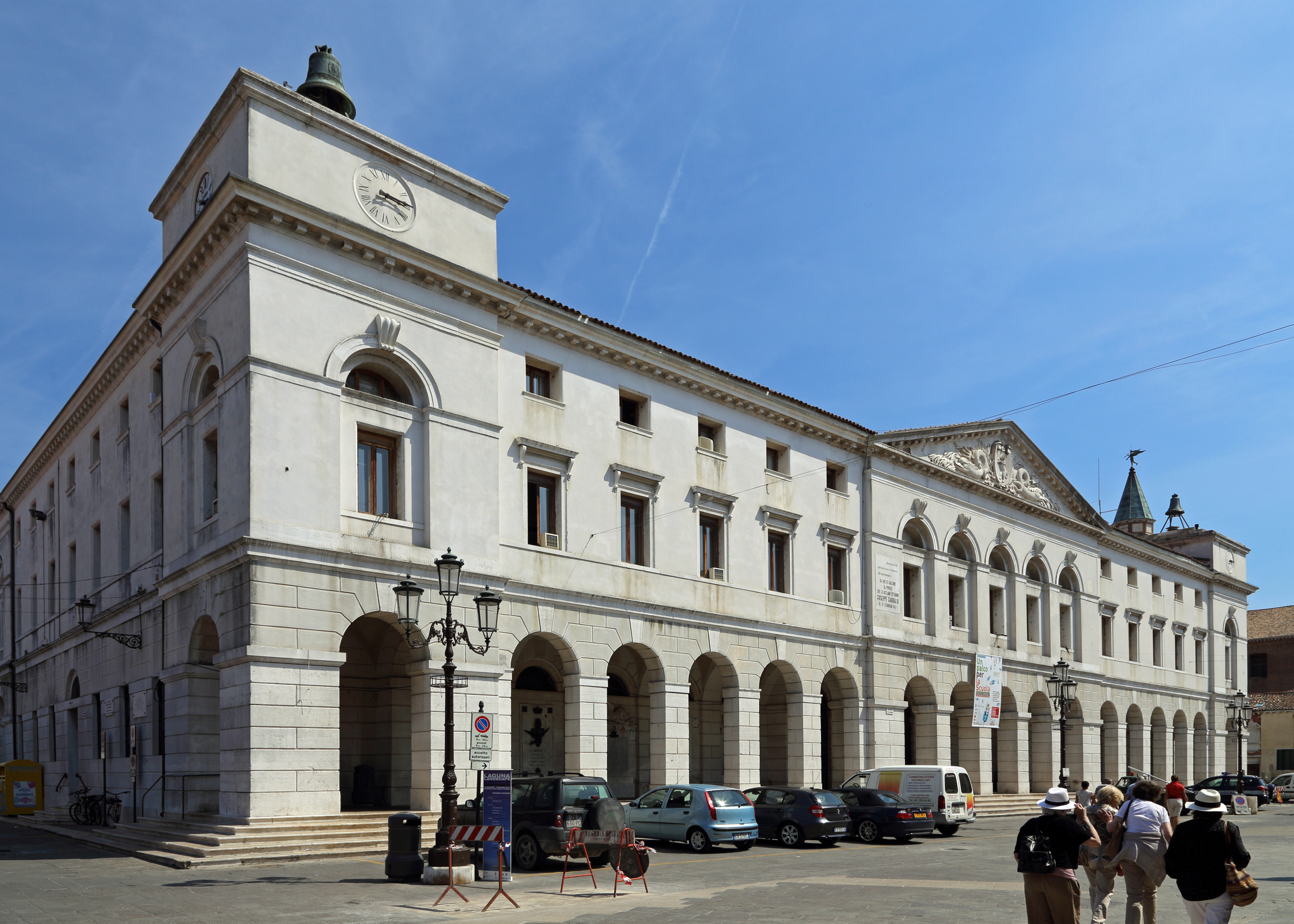
Town Hall (Palazzo Municipale)

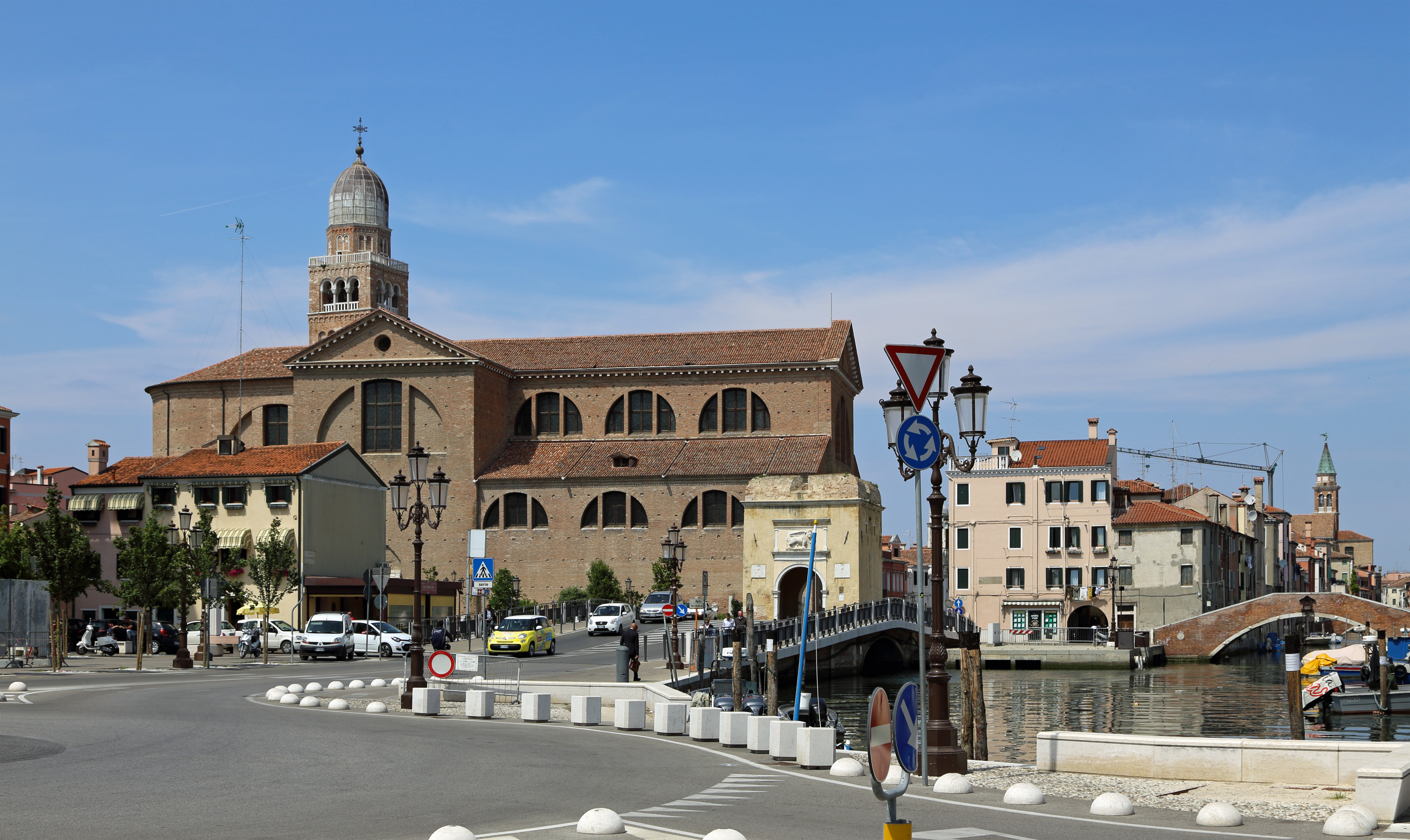
Cathedral

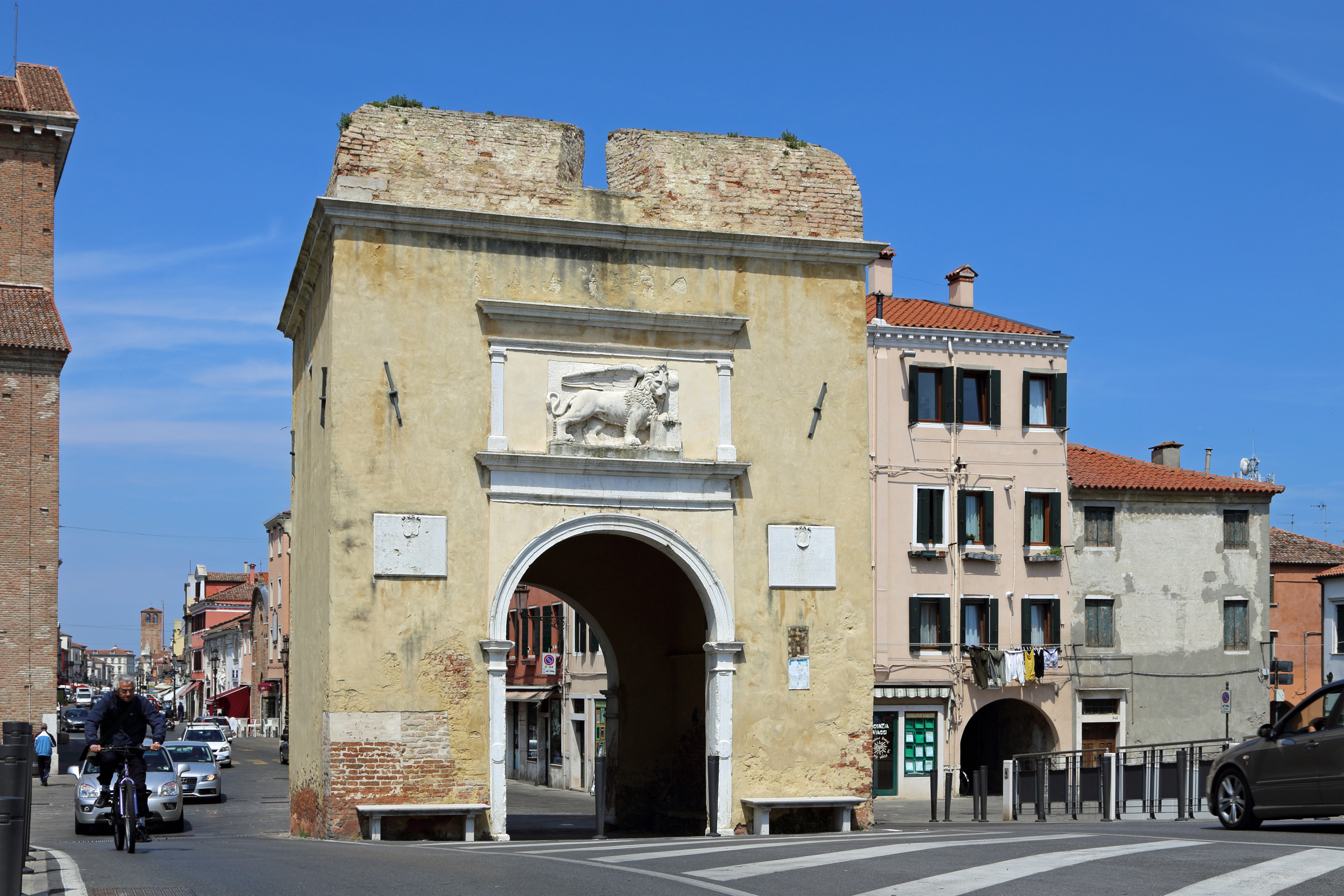
Santa Maria or Garibaldi Gate

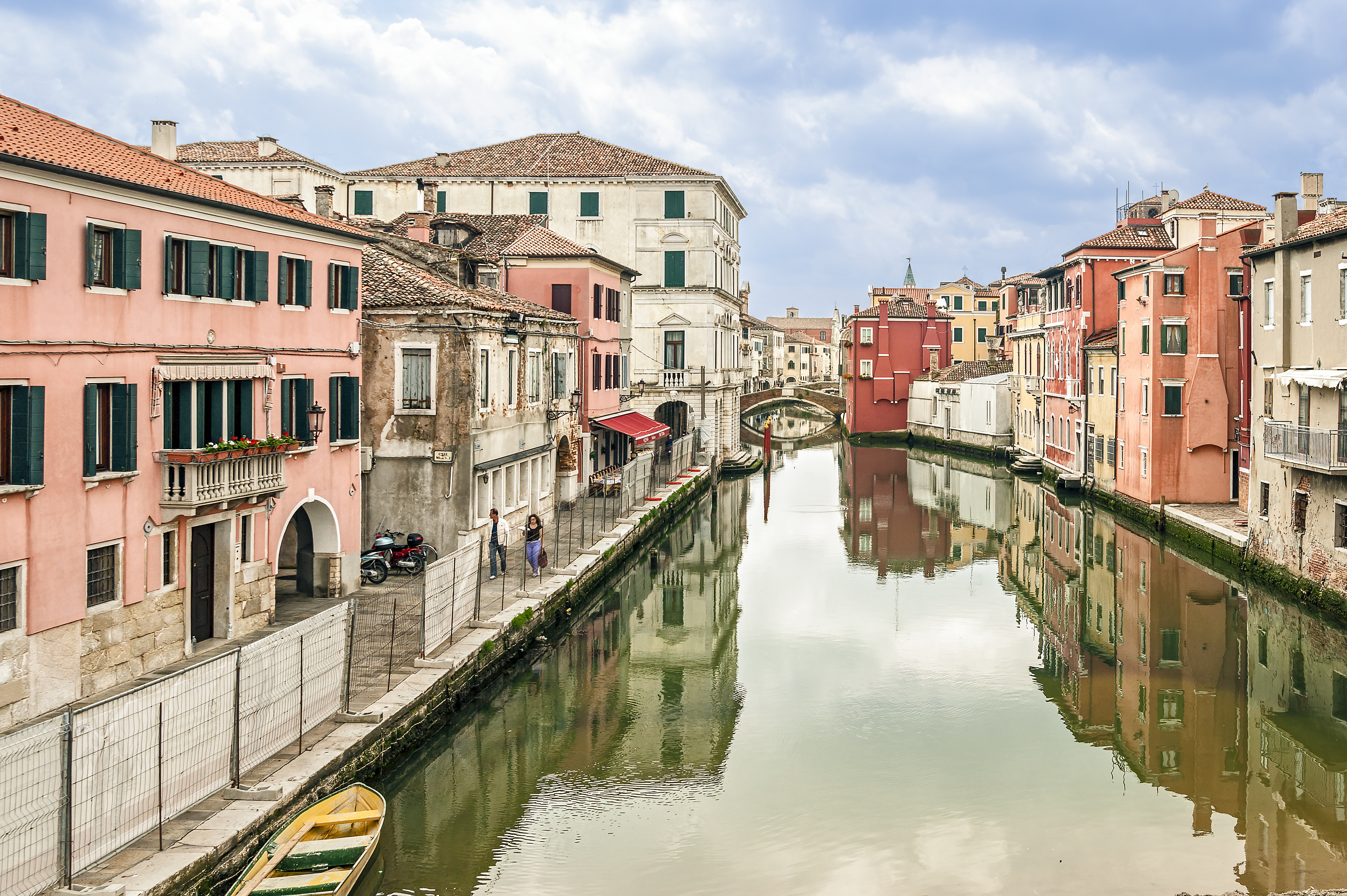
Canal Vena

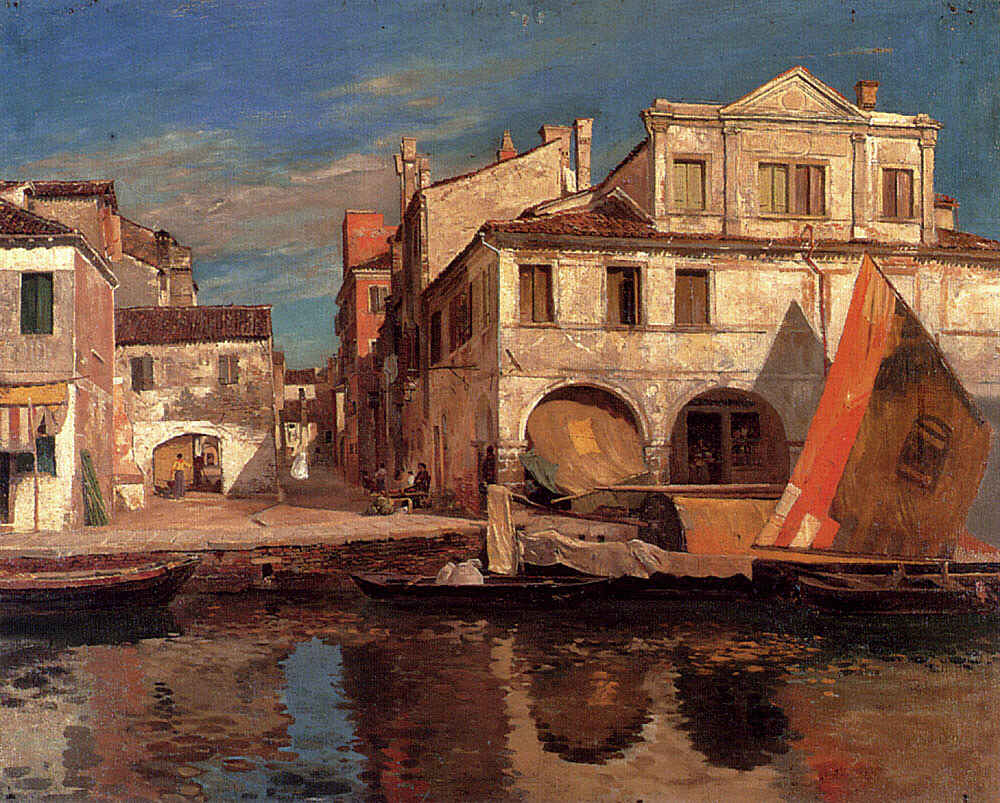
Canal scene in late 19th-century Chioggia, by Gustav Bauernfeind

Chioggia (Italian: [ˈkjɔddʒa], locally [ˈkjoddʒa]; Venetian: Cioxa [ˈtʃɔza], locally [ˈtʃoza]; Latin: Clodia; see below for more) is a coastal town and comune (municipality) of the Metropolitan City of Venice in the Veneto region of northern Italy.

== Geography ==
The town is located on a small island at the southern entrance to the Venetian Lagoon about 25 kilometres (16 miles) south of Venice (50 km (31 mi) by road); causeways connect it to the mainland and to its frazione, nowadays a quarter, of Sottomarina. The population of the comune is around 50,000, with the town proper accounting for about half of that and Sottomarina for most of the rest.

The municipality, located in south of the province, close to the provinces of Padua and Rovigo, borders Campagna Lupia, Cavarzere, Codevigo, Cona, Correzzola, Loreo, Rosolina and Venice.

== History ==
Chioggia and Sottomarina were not prominent in antiquity, although they are first mentioned by Pliny as the fossa Clodia. Local legend attributes this name to its founding by a Clodius, but the origin of this belief is not known.

The name of the town has changed often, being Clodia, Cluza, Clugia, Chiozza, Chiozzo, Chioggio, and Chioggia. The most ancient documents naming Chioggia date from the 6th century AD, when it was part of the Byzantine Empire. Chioggia was destroyed by King Pippin of Italy in the 9th century, but rebuilt around a new industry based on salt pans. In the Middle Ages, Chioggia proper was known as Clugia major, whereas Clugia minor was a sand bar about 600 m further into the Adriatic. A free commune and an episcopal see from 1110, it had later an important role in the War of Chioggia between Genoa and Venice, being conquered by Genoa in 1378 and finally by Venice in June 1380. Although the town remained largely autonomous, it was always thereafter subordinate to Venice. On 14 March 1381, Chioggia concluded an alliance with Zadar and Trogir against Venice, and finally Chioggia became better protected by Venice in 1412, because Šibenik became in 1412 the seat of the main customs office and the seat of the salt consumers office with a monopoly on the salt trade in Chioggia and on the whole Adriatic Sea.

== Culture ==
Until the 19th century, women in Chioggia wore an outfit based on an apron which could be raised to serve as a veil. Chioggia is also known for lace-making; like Pellestrina, but unlike Burano, this lace is made using bobbins.

Chioggia served Carlo Goldoni as the setting of his play "Le baruffe chiozzotte", one of the classics of Italian literature: a baruffa was a loud brawl, and chiozzotto (today more frequently chioggiotto in Italian, or cioxoto in Venetian) is the demonym for Chioggia. The play is replete with lacemaking, fishermen, and other local color.

== Main sights ==
Chioggia is often called "Little Venice", with a few canals, chief among them the Canale Vena, and the characteristic narrow streets known as calli. Chioggia has several medieval churches, much reworked in the period of its greatest prosperity in the 16th and 17th centuries.

The church dedicated to St. Mary of the Assumption, founded in the eleventh century, became a cathedral in 1110, then was rebuilt as Chioggia Cathedral from 1623 by Baldassare Longhena.

St. Andrew's Church (18th century) has a bell tower from the 11th to 12th centuries, the most ancient tower watch in the world. The interior has a Crucifixion by Palma the Elder.

== Economy ==
Fishing is historically the livelihood of the port, and remains a significant economic sector. Other important modern industries include textiles, brick-making and steel; and Sottomarina, with 60 hotels and 17 campgrounds, is almost entirely given over to seafront tourism.

== Traditions and folklore ==
During the third week end of June, the festival of Palio della Marciliana takes place.

== Catholic churches ==
- Cattedrale di Santa Maria Assunta, is the main church of Chioggia and the cathedral of the diocese of the same name;
- Basilica minore di San Giacomo Apostolo, in March 1906 Pope Pius X he raised it to the dignity of a minor basilica
- Chiesa dei Santi Apostoli Pietro e Paolo, built in the 14th century by Pietro Mazzagallo;
- Tempietto di San Martino, small church in gothic style construction began in 1394;
- Chiesa di San Francesco, built at the end of the 14th century, interiors were embellished in Rococo style in 1743;
- Chiesa di Santa Caterina, the current structure developed in the 17th century under the project of Baldassarre Longhena;
- Chiesa della Santissima Trinità, through the church you can access to Rossi's oratory with its ceiling decorated with frames;
- Chiesa del Patrocinio della Beata Vergine Maria e di San Filippo Neri, built thanks to Ludovico Alvise Manin in the 18th century;
- Chiesa di Sant'Andrea Apostolo, it has a bell tower from the 10th century watchtower which houses the oldest functioning tower clock in the world;
- Chiesa di San Domenico, it contains a fourteenth-century Crucifix much venerated by the local citizens;

=== Particularity of surnames ===
Chioggia represents an almost unique demographic case in Italy: the most common surname among the inhabitants of Chioggia is Zennaro, while the most common surnames of Sottomarina are Boscolo and Tiozzo.

Because of the large number of people with the same surname, the comune officialized what is known as "detto" (popular nicknames used to distinguish the various branches of the same family). These "third names" are inserted in every official document, including the driving license and the identity card.

== Notable people ==
- Jacopo De Dondi (1290–1359), doctor, astronomer and clock-maker.
- Giovanni De Dondi (ca.1330 – 1388), an Italian physician, astronomer and mechanical engineer.
- Niccolò de' Conti (ca.1395–1469), an Italian merchant, explorer, and writer.
- John Cabot (1450 – ca.1500), an Italian navigator and explorer.
- Gioseffo Zarlino (1517–1590), Italian musical theorist.
- Rosalba Carriera (1673–1757), a Venetian Rococo painter.
- Stefano Andrea Renier (1759–1830), an Italian naturalist, zoologist and scientist.
- Giuseppe Olivi (1769–1795), an Italian abbot and naturalist.
- Luigi Taccheo (1849–1940), an Italian pianist and composer.
- Aristide Cavallari (1849–1914), a Cardinal of the Roman Catholic Church and Patriarch of Venice.
- Giuseppe Veronese (1854–1917), an Italian mathematician.
- Eugenio Bonivento (1880–1956), an Italian painter.
- Lina Merlin (1887–1979), an Italian politician, promoted "Merlin law".
- Bruno Maderna (1920–1973), an Italian conductor and composer.

== International relations ==
=== Twin towns – Sister cities ===
Chioggia is twinned with:

- Lamia (Greece, 2007)
- Saint-Tropez (France, 2008)

== Trivia ==
Chioggia gives its name to a variety of beetroot, radicchio (Italian chicory), and pumpkin (Marina di Chioggia).

== Climate ==
Climate data for Chioggia (1991–2020)
Month	Jan	Feb	Mar	Apr	May	Jun	Jul	Aug	Sep	Oct	Nov	Dec	Year
Mean daily maximum °C (°F)	7.1 (44.8)	9.4 (48.9)	13.5 (56.3)	17.6 (63.7)	22.7 (72.9)	26.9 (80.4)	29.2 (84.6)	29.0 (84.2)	24.4 (75.9)	19.1 (66.4)	13.0 (55.4)	8.0 (46.4)	18.3 (65.0)
Daily mean °C (°F)	4.1 (39.4)	5.5 (41.9)	9.1 (48.4)	13.2 (55.8)	17.9 (64.2)	21.7 (71.1)	23.7 (74.7)	23.6 (74.5)	19.3 (66.7)	14.9 (58.8)	9.7 (49.5)	5.0 (41.0)	14.0 (57.2)
Mean daily minimum °C (°F)	1.1 (34.0)	1.6 (34.9)	4.7 (40.5)	8.7 (47.7)	13.1 (55.6)	16.6 (61.9)	18.2 (64.8)	18.2 (64.8)	14.3 (57.7)	10.7 (51.3)	6.5 (43.7)	2.1 (35.8)	9.7 (49.4)
Average precipitation mm (inches)	37.8 (1.49)	49.4 (1.94)	55.5 (2.19)	57.7 (2.27)	66.9 (2.63)	73.6 (2.90)	51.0 (2.01)	72.9 (2.87)	93.8 (3.69)	98.6 (3.88)	84.1 (3.31)	65.4 (2.57)	806.7 (31.75)
Average precipitation days (≥ 1.0 mm)	5.2	5.5	6.0	7.6	7.2	6.9	4.9	5.9	6.9	6.8	8.3	7.2	78.4
Source: Istituto Superiore per la Protezione e la Ricerca Ambientale

== See also ==
- A.C. Chioggia Sottomarina
- Bosco Nordio
