= Chiesa di San Francesco, Chioggia =

Church building in Chioggia, Italy

Chiesa di San Francesco
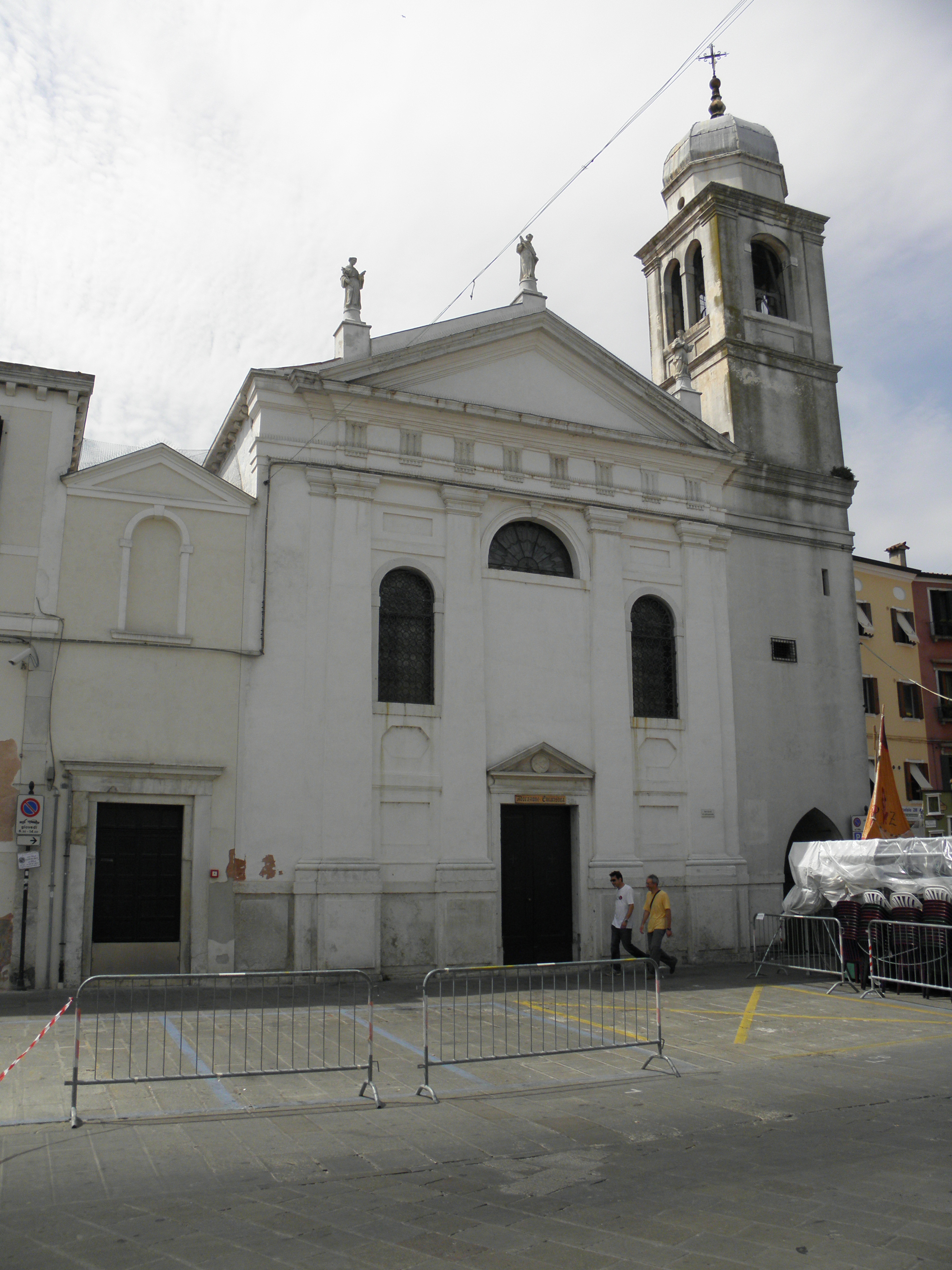
- The church of San Francesco

Religion
- Affiliation: Catholic
- Province: Venice
- Region: Veneto
- Patron: Francis of Assisi

Location
- Location: Chioggia, Venice, Italy
- State: Italy
- Interactive map of Chiesa di San Francesco
- Territory: Chioggia
- Coordinates: 45°13′05″N 12°16′40″E

Architecture
- Groundbreaking: 1385

The Chiesa di San Francesco, ("The Church of San Francesco") in Chioggia is a religious building that overlooks on the main square of the city, is a Catholic church located in Chioggia, in the province of Venice, Veneto, Italy.
This church is also called San Francesco "old" or "inside the walls" to distinguish it from the other church of San Francesco, the current Civic Museum, located 350 meters further south, beyond the Porta Di Santa Maria, the last remnant of the ancient city walls to the south.

== History ==
The first informations of the Franciscan presence in the city dates back to the mid-1200s, the convent community as it grew, sought new spaces by building the new convent outside the walls at the beginning of the 1300s; unfortunately the works were interrupted during the War of Chioggia. Subsequently, the works remained unfinished due to the interdiction of the Venetian Senate, which forbade the construction of any construction outside the city walls. The religious community therefore remained in the old convent, expanding its spaces. Things changed around the 1430s when the ban on construction ceased and the construction of the new convent began again and the transfer took place over the following decades.

On 10 October 1512, the convent became a monastery with the arrival of the Cistercian Sisters, coming in part from the ancient city monastery of Santa Caterina. The population of nuns, who followed the rule of enclosure, grew until it reached about fifty units in the mid-eighteenth century.

An interesting anecdote has it that the playwright Carlo Goldoni, who lived opposite the church during the years of his work in Chioggia, established a close relationship with the nuns, so much so that he created a series of sonnets and speeches for them which they rewarded with various sweet delicacies.

In 1805, at the behest of the Austrian government, the nuns of San Francesco together with those of Santa Croce had to move to the Convent of Santa Caterina to free up buildings to be used as barracks.

The church built in 1385 housed the main altar to the east with the entrance from the north with sober furnishings in full Franciscan style.

Important alterations come from 1743 by Domenico Cestari from Chioggia, who embellished the temple in rococo style.

The place of worship has always been open or semi-open to the public and today it is under the jurisdiction of the Cathedral of Chioggia and inside it during the winter the weekday masses are celebrated instead of the cathedral and always only in the winter there is daily Eucharistic adoration.

== Outside ==
The 14m high facade was adorned with Istrian stone statues of St. Francis in the center of the tympanum, St. Anthony of Padua on the left and St. Bonaventureon the right. Behind the bell tower along the north side wall of the church a corridor was built in 1612 which connects the monastery to the bell tower.

== Bell Tower ==
The 19-metre high bell tower can be dated to around the first decade of the 1600s, the base recalls the advanced Gothic style with its pointed arch, while the dome dates back to 1743. Four bells are housed in the belfry.

== Inside ==
On the floor there are several tombstones dating from the 1600s and 1700s, the most noteworthy are the central one with the Cestari family crest and the one to the right of the altar of the Immaculate Conception where Pasquale Grassi, bishop of Chioggia between 1618 and 1636, could not be buried in the cathedral because it was undergoing reconstruction.

The interior of the church, with a rectangular plan, measures 10 meters in width, 32 in length and 13.70 in height. It has several altars, arranged in an anti-clockwise direction as follows:

- Altar of San Gaetano Thiene with wooden statue of the twentieth century;
- Altar of the Immaculate Conception with marble statue by the sculptor Pietro Baratta;
- High Altar, adorned with polychrome marble with an eighteenth-century tabernacle, equipped with a niche for the display of the Eucharist and surmounted by a small dome: on the right the statue of San Bernardino da Siena and on the left that of San Bonaventura da Bagnoregio;
- Altar of St. Francis with statue produced by the sculptor Josef Hermann Runggardier from 1987;
- Altar of San Nicola Tolentino with wooden statue of the twentieth century;

The vaulted ceiling are adorned with stuccoes by Giacomo Gaspari and paintings by Michele Schiavoni depicting the life of San Francesco and San Benedetto. Above the side entrance there is an eighteenth-century canvas depicting St. Francis in ecstasy, from the now abandoned church of Our Lady of the Stigmata.
