= Sottomarina =

- Frazione
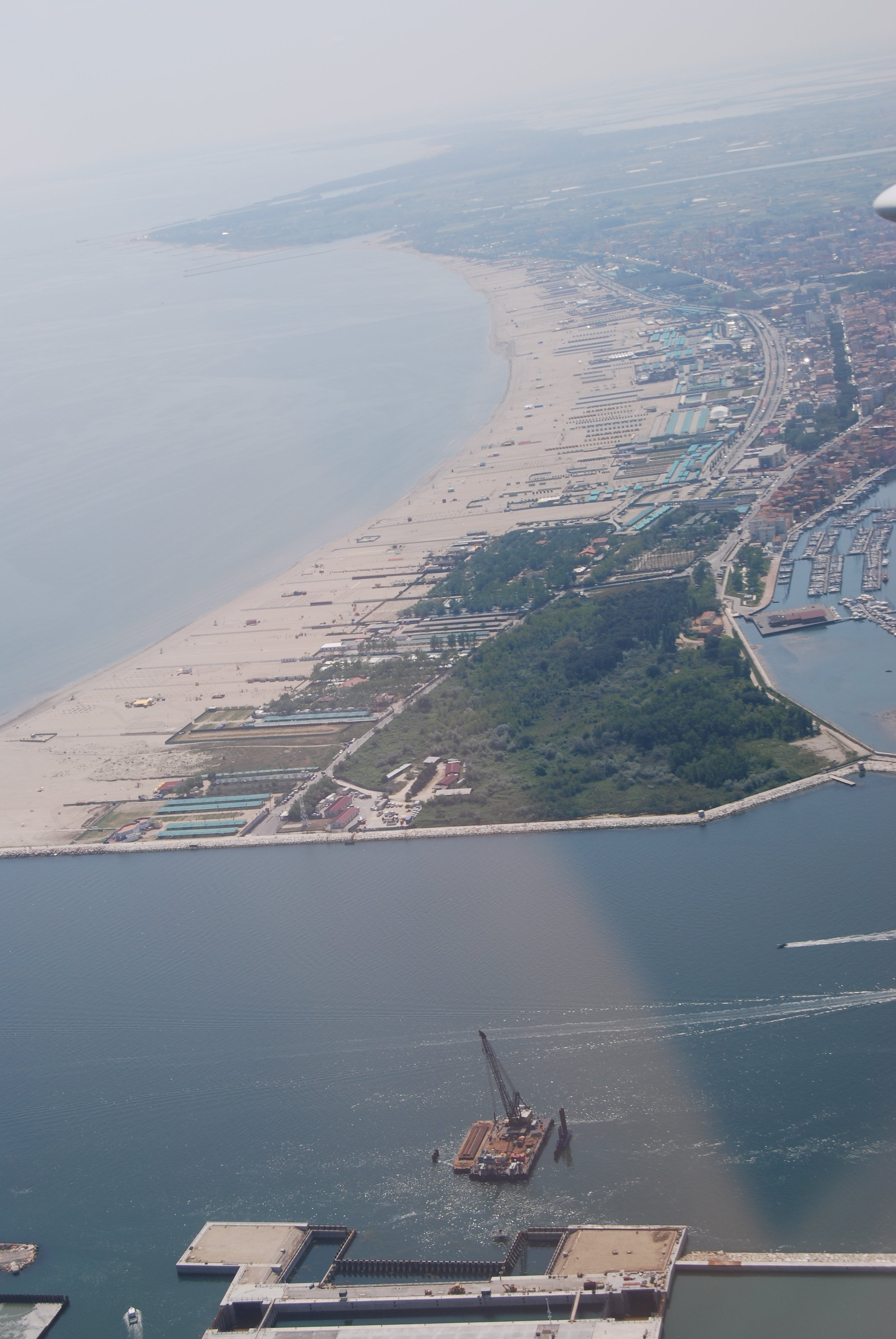
- Aerial view

- Location of Sottomarina in Italy
- Coordinates: 45°12′53″N 12°17′41″E
- Country: Italy
- Region: Veneto
- Province: Venice (VE)
- Comune: Chioggia
- Elevation: 2 m (6.6 ft)
- Demonym: Marinanti
- Time zone: UTC+1 (CET)
  - Summer (DST): UTC+2 (CEST)
- Postal code: 30015
- Dialing code: 041

Sottomarina is a small town on a peninsula which has the same name. It is a frazione of the comune of Chioggia, which is part of the Metropolitan City of Venice in the Veneto region in north-eastern Italy.

== Geography ==
Sottomarina is a peninsula which protrudes into the Lagoon of Venice, forming its southern coastal tract. The other parts of the coastline of this lagoon are the barrier islands of Pellestrina and Lido, in the middle, and the peninsula of Cavallino in the north. Sottomarina is separated form Pellestrina by the Chioggia inlet. The lagoon side of its coast is by the islands which form the town of Chioggia and on the eastern side of the Val di Brenta, southernmost basin of the lagoon. It southern end is cut through by the mouth of the River Brenta. The peninsula is narrow at the northern end as it widens and it progress southwards. The town is close to Chioggia and it is connected with it by a 700 m bridge.

== History ==
The main settlement in Sottomarina was known as Clodia Minor in the 7th century AD. This distinguished it form Clodia Major, which is now the town of Chioggia. These Latin names then morphed into Chioggia Minore and Chioggia Maggiore. The settlement was governed by its own tribune and issued its own laws. It was connected to Chioggia by a stone bridge. It had the churches of San Martino, Sant'Antonio Abate, San Matteo, a hospital and a castle with a tower on an islet named after it (Buoncastello), just off the northeastern corner of the peninsula.

The town was destroyed in 1379, during the War of Chioggia between the Republics of Genoa and Venice. The senate of the Republic of Venice forbade its rebuilding until the second half 17th century. During that period it was uninhabited and subject to floods. In the 18th century, the murazzi, the imposing Istrian stone bank was built to protect Sottomarina from storm surges.

At the southern end of Sottomarina there is the hamlet of Brondolo. The doge Teodato Ipato (742-55) had a fort built at Brondolo to protect the southern end of the Duchy of Venice.

There used to be a small lagoon, the lagoon of Brondolo, south of the Lagoon of Venice and close to Brondolo, to its southeast. The two lagoons were connected by the Brondolo inlet. The Republic of Venice carried out a number of southwards diversions of the river Brenta, which was causing silting in the central area of the Lagoon of Venice. In one of these it was taken to flow into another part of the lagoon, in the Val di Brenta basin, on its shore opposite Chioggia, with the creation of a canal called Brenta Nova, which was completed in 1507. Then the Venetians built the Parador di Brondolo, an embankment, to cut this river off the Lagoon of Venice and to separate this lagoon form the Lagoon of Brondolo. It was taken to the Brondolo inlet and made to flow into the latter lagoon. This was completed in 1577. Since this lagoon was closed off from the sea, it was turned into a freshwater coastal lake in a couple of centuries due to the river bringing in freshwater. Later this lagoon silted as the river brought in its sediments.

The last diversion of the Brenta occurred in the 1930s with the construction of an embankment to take this river to the sea. This was done to prevent further silting, to safeguard the local flora and fauna, which were being compromised, and to prevent malaria. Since then, the southern side of the coast of Sottomarina has been widening at an average rate of three metres a year due to the sediments brought to the shore by the river.

== Economy ==
Traditionally the inhabitants of this peninsula were farmers, while those of Chioggia were fishermen. Today Sottomarina is primarily a busy seaside resort, thanks to its proximity to Venice, Padua, Vicenza, Verona and Rovigo. The first beach resorts, together with an over 2 km long promenade, were built in 1900-1903. The sandy beach is 5 1/2 km long and reaches a width of 300 metres in some places.

== Gallery ==
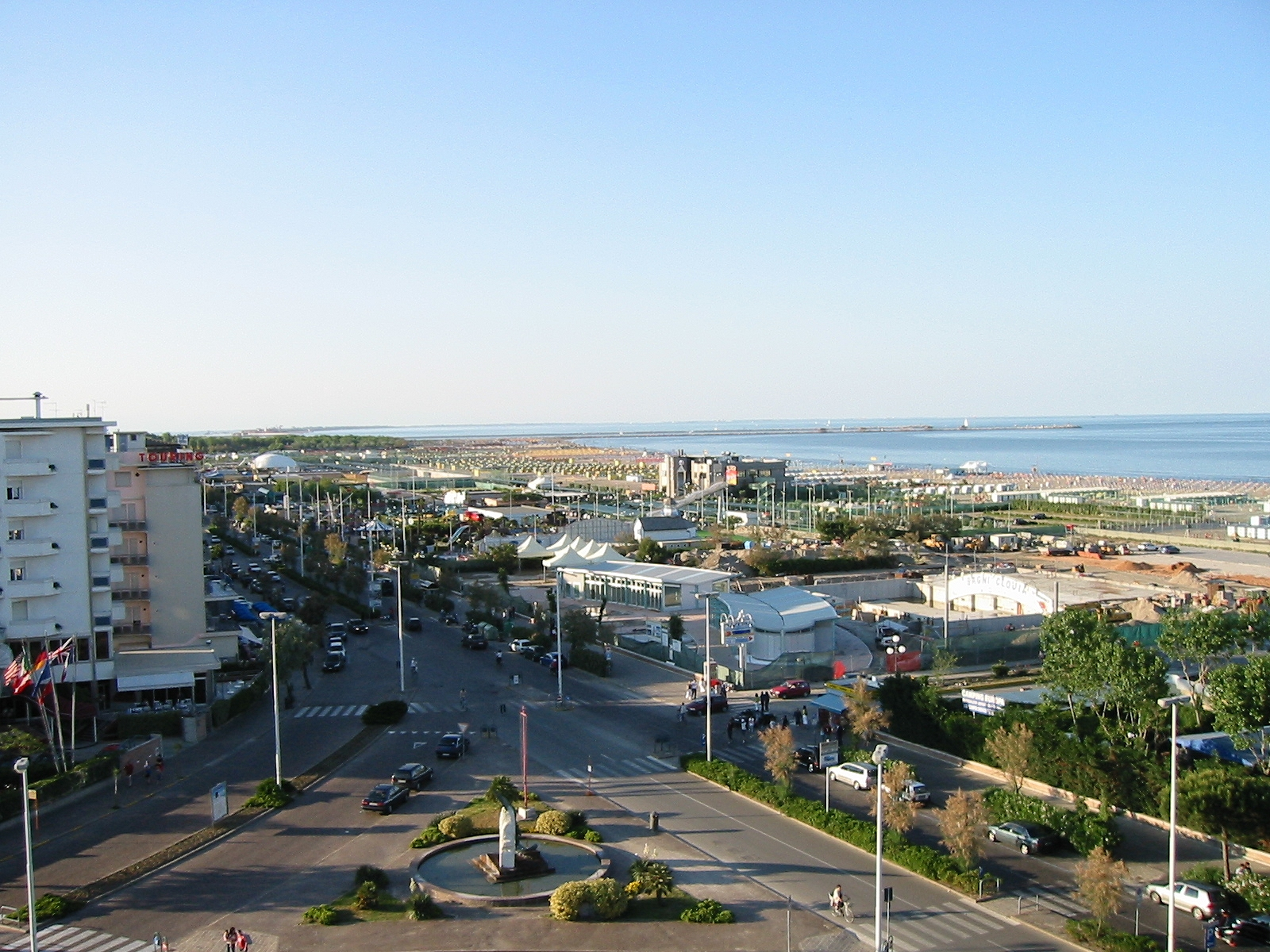
View of Lungomare Adriatico at the intersection with Viale Umbria

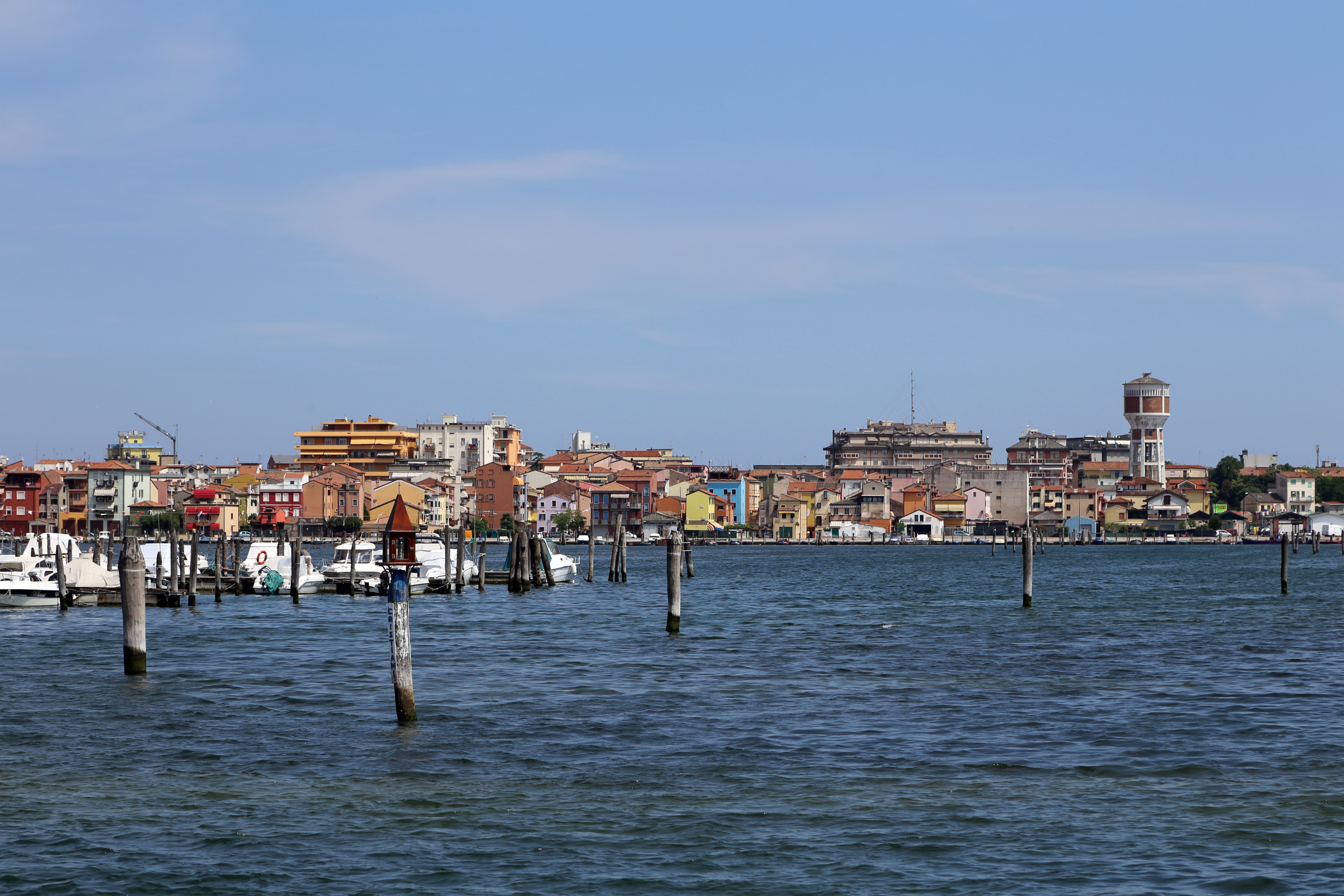
Lagoon side of Sottomarina, seen from Chioggia

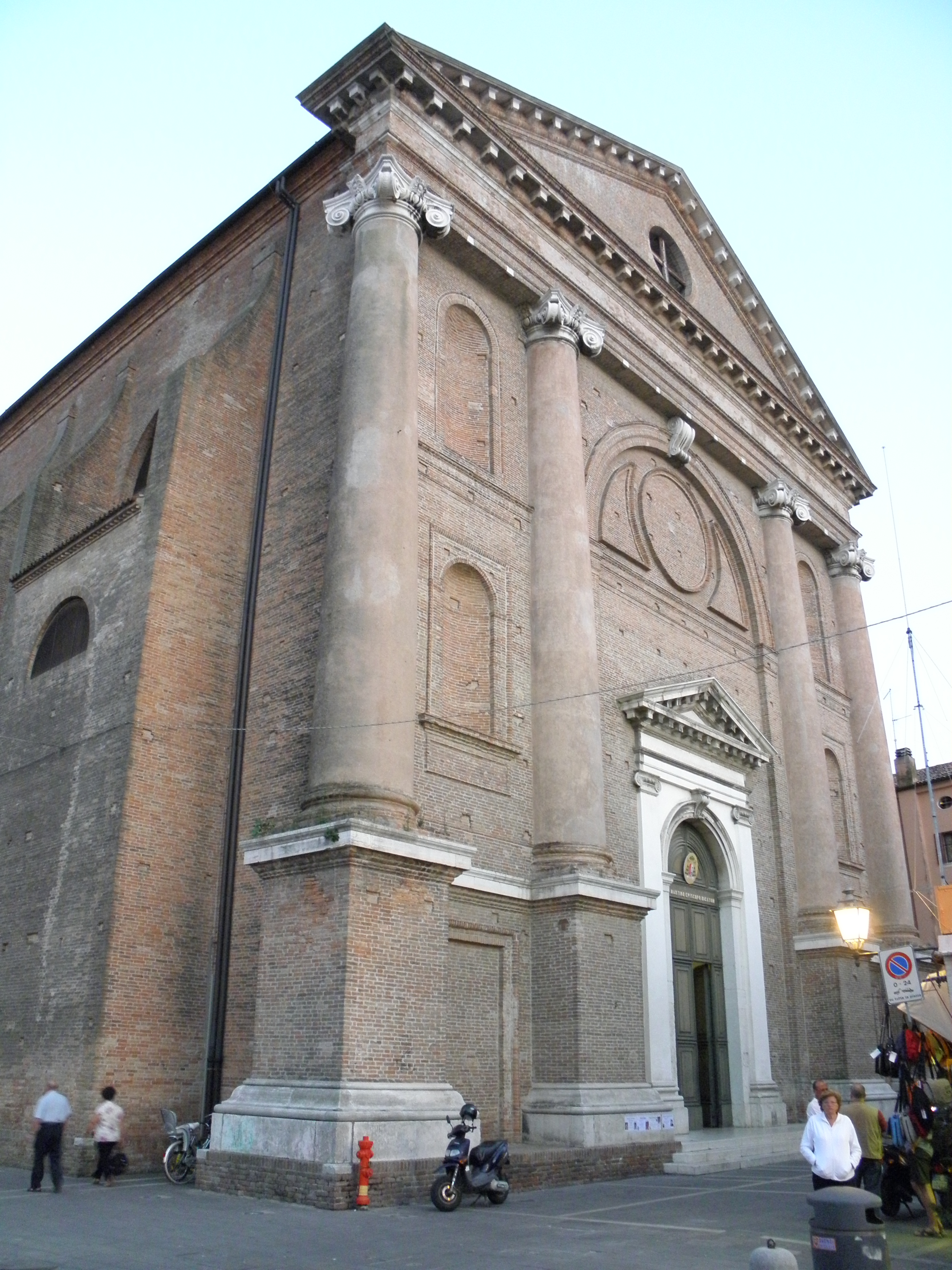
The church of St. Martin

== See also ==
- Clodiense S.S.D.
