= Eugenio Bonivento =

Italian painter (1880–1956)

- Born: 8 June 1880; Chioggia, Kingdom of Italy
- Died: 12 November 1956 (aged 76); Milan, Italy
- Education: Academy of Fine Arts of Venice
- Occupation: Painter

Eugenio Bonivento (8 June 1880 – 12 November 1956) was an Italian painter.

== Biography and artistic production ==
He was born in Chioggia and studied in the Academy of Fine Arts of Venice. Later he became the pupil of Guglielmo Ciardi.

In his canvases he painted mainly the Venetian lagoon and countryside. Among the exhibitions of his career, notable were the participations in the Venice Biennale in 1912, 1920, 1922 and 1924.

Paintings by Bonivento are displayed at the Galleria d'Arte Moderna of Milan, at the Galleria internazionale d'Arte Moderna of Venice, at the Civic Museum of Bassano del Grappa, at the Museum of Italian Art of Lima, at the art collection of the Banca Commerciale Italiana and at the Pinacoteca Giovanni Morscio in Dolceacqua.
