= Alberto Rossi (painter) =

Italian painter

Alberto Rossi (Turin, 1858 - 1936) was an Italian painter, mainly as a portrait but also as a landscape painter.

He was a pupil at the Albertina Academy in Turin. In 1883, at the Exhibition of Milan he display Un Mulino. In 1884 at the Turin Exposition, he exhibited his Portrait of a man and some landscapes, his preferred subject. In 1887 to the Venice Exposition he sent five works, including Accanto al fuoco; Dopo un acquazzone (depicting laborers in a quarry); Tardo autunno; and Valle d'Anirana.
