= Maurice Louis Monnot =

French painter (1869–1937)

- Born: October 22, 1869; Paris
- Died: 1937 (aged 67–68); Gournay-sur-Marne
- Known for: Painting

Maurice Louis Monnot (English: /mɒˈnoʊ/ mo-NOH, French: [mɔʁis lwi mɔnɔ]; 22 October 1869 – 1937) was a French painter.

== Biography ==
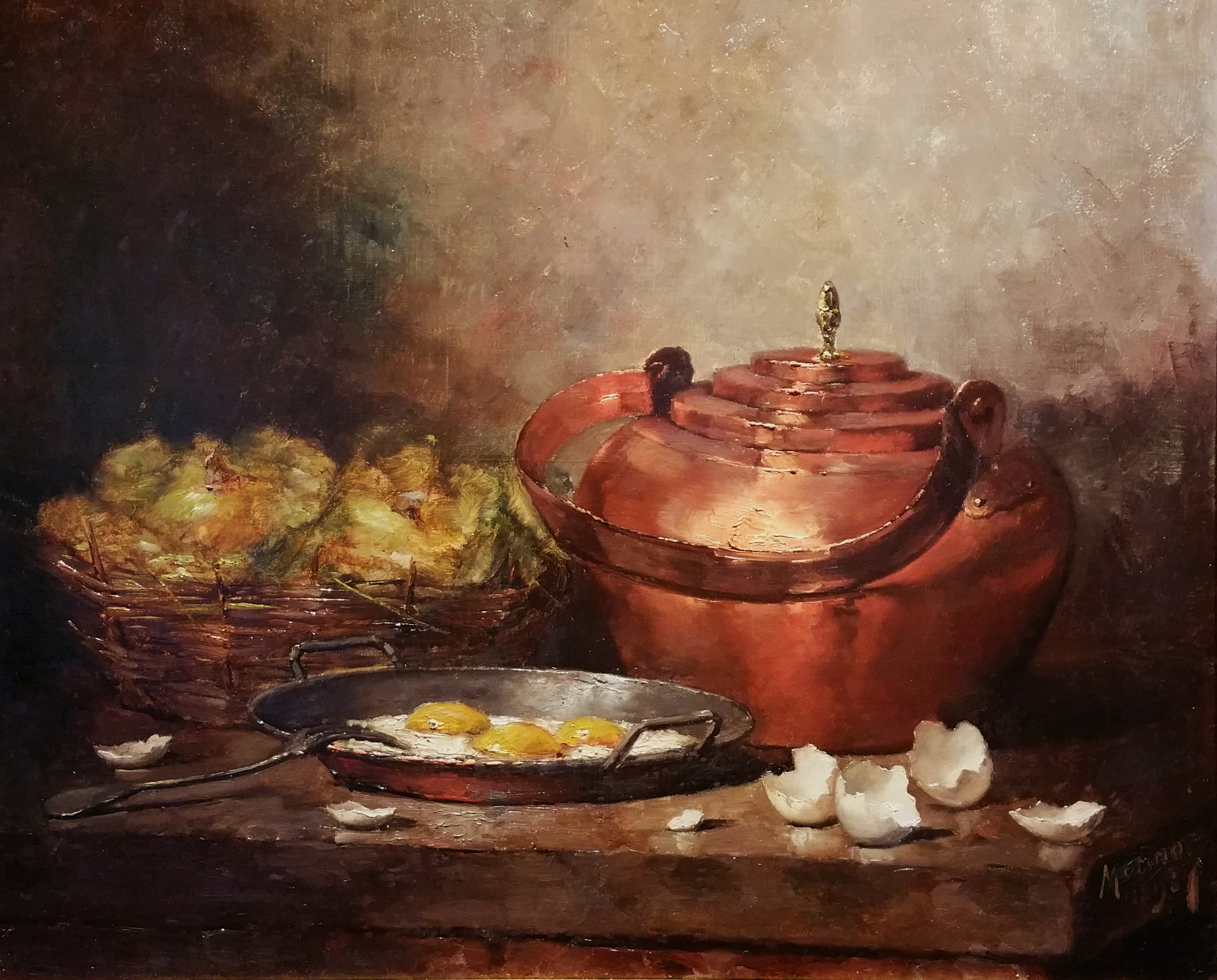
Attributed to Maurice Louis Monnot, Nature morte

He was a student of the French realist painter Joseph Bail. Monnot presented his works at the Salon des Artistes Français in 1906 and at the Salon des Artistes Indépendants in 1913. Monnot was a painter of still lifes and rustic interiors, with his skill at painting reflective copper effects being particularly noted and earning him praise in Paris and the provinces.

== Works in public collections ==
- Troyes, Musée des Beaux-Arts : La Passoire, 1912.
