= Chioggia Cathedral =

- Cattedrale di Santa Maria Assunta
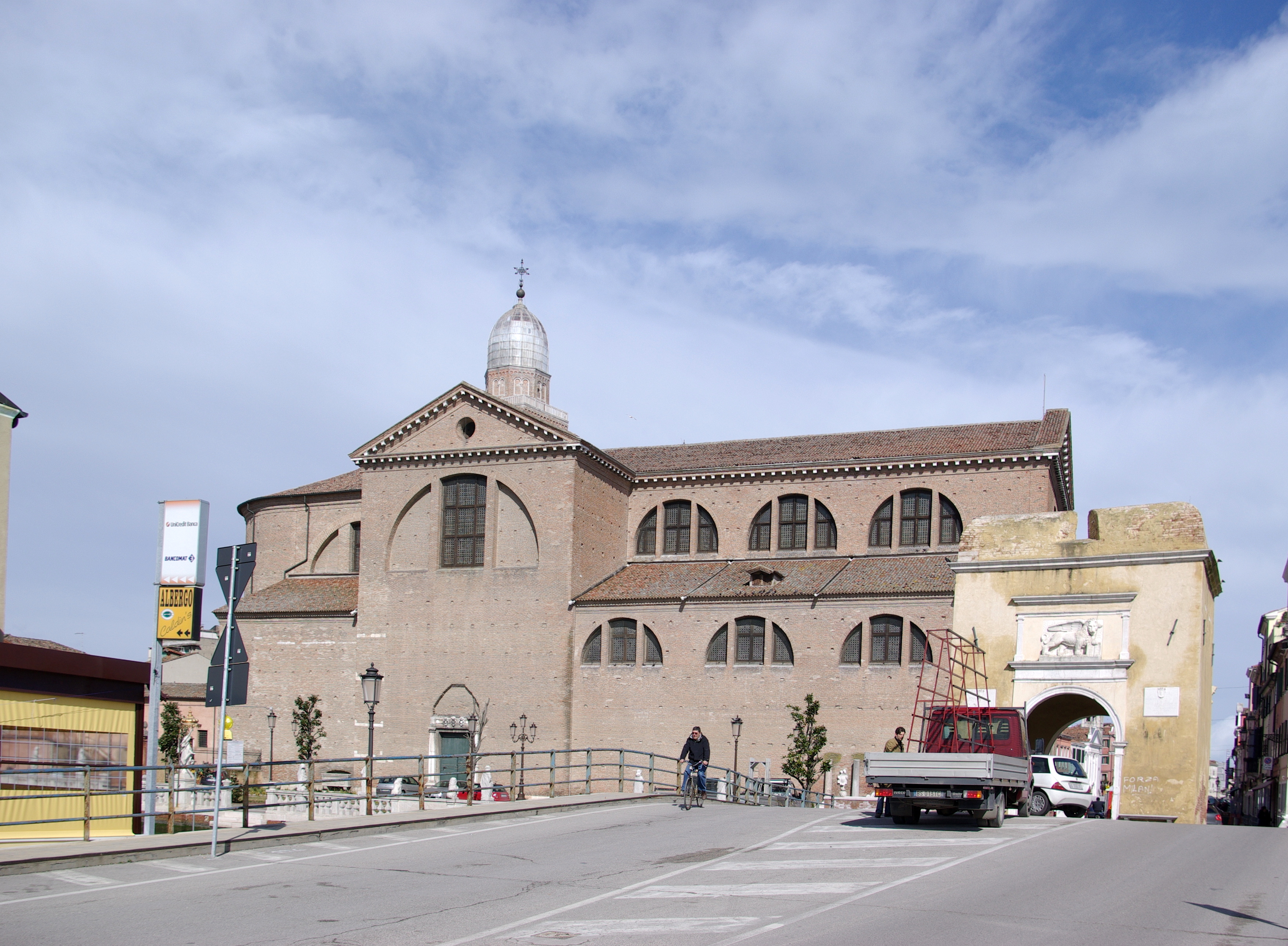
- Cattedrale di Santa Maria Assunta

- Location within Veneto
- 45.217056°N 12.27725°E
- Country: Italy
- Denomination: Roman Catholic
- Website: www.cattedralechioggia.it

History
- Founded: 15 August 1624
- Founder: Pietro Morari
- Consecrated: 27 May 1674

Architecture
- Architect: Baldassare Longhena
- Style: Corinthian and Ionic
- Years built: 1624–27

Administration
- Diocese: Diocese of Chioggia

Chioggia Cathedral (Italian: Duomo di Chioggia, Cattedrale di Santa Maria Assunta) is the main place of worship in Chioggia, Italy, in the south of the Venetian Lagoon. It dates from 1627. The interior contains many interesting works of art.

== History ==
The Cathedral of Chioggia, dedicated to St. Mary of the Assumption, was built on the site of an ancient church dedicated to Mary that probably dated to the 8th century, and is mentioned around 1000 AD. Around that time the people of Chioggia began building a splendid new cathedral. This had a "Ravenna" style basilical layout, with a long nave and two aisles, with a semi-circular apse at the east end. It was 63 metres (207 ft) long, and 45 metres (148 ft) wide at the transepts. The cathedral was destroyed by fire on the night of 25–26 December 1623. At the time the fire was said to have been caused by arson. The altarpiece of gold and silver could not be found in the ruins that remained after the fire.

The task of rebuilding the cathedral was given to the architect Baldassare Longhena, who provided a design that blended Corinthian and Ionic styles. The foundation stone was laid on 15 August 1624 by Bishop Pietro Morari. The external structure was built in three years, and the first mass was celebrated on 21 September 1627. Between 1627 and 1671 the inside of the cathedral was completed with the construction of the altar and installation of many sculptures, some of considerable artistic value. The cathedral was formally blessed and opened for worship in 1648, and was officially consecrated on 27 May 1674. On 16 September 1988 the roof of the transept collapsed. It was rebuilt and the cathedral reopened.

== Exterior ==
The old bell tower from 1347 stands in the square beside the cathedral. The church of San Martino from 1393 to 1394 is on the third side of the square. The building is surrounded by 51 vertical headstones and 34 horizontal gravestones. The exterior has marble statues of the martyr saints Felice and Fortunato, patrons of the city and diocese of Chioggia. They were once housed in the sanctuary of the church of the Blessed Virgin Mary of the Navicella a Sottomarina, from the 16th century. The statues were installed in two niches at the end of the 17th century.

== Interior ==
The floor and the rich decoration of the two side chapels of the Blessed Sacrament and the patron saints date to the end of the 17th century and start of the 18th century, as do the imposing wooden choir stalls in the huge sanctuary. The back wall of the north aisle has a painting by the Venetian artist Alvise Tagliapietra from 1708 that depicts the baptism of Jesus. The altar of St. John the Baptist was consecrated in 1674. To the right of the altar is a wooden statue of the Sacred Heart of Jesus by the sculptor Cadorin from 1904.

Alessandro Tremignon designed the high altar with engraved scenes of the life of the Virgin Mary and the two patron saints. The altar of Santa Maria Assunta was consecrated in 1682. The elaborate altar includes the work of Bartolomeo Cavalieri, who made the stucco statue above the altar in about 1677. Bas-reliefs made by Domenico Negri about 1680 depict the nativity of Jesus, flanked by reliefs of Mary's visit to Elizabeth and the Presentation of Jesus at the Temple.

Other bas-reliefs and statues were made by Negri, Pietro Liberi (1670–80) and Antonio Bonazza (1740–50). To the right of the altar are more recent statues of the martyrs Felice and Fortunato in aluminum by the sculptor Luigi Tomaz (1980). The altar of St. Michael the Archangel and the Saints Jerome and Augustine (or Anthony) date from the 17th century, topped by a Trinity by Palma il Giovane from the first half of the 17th century.

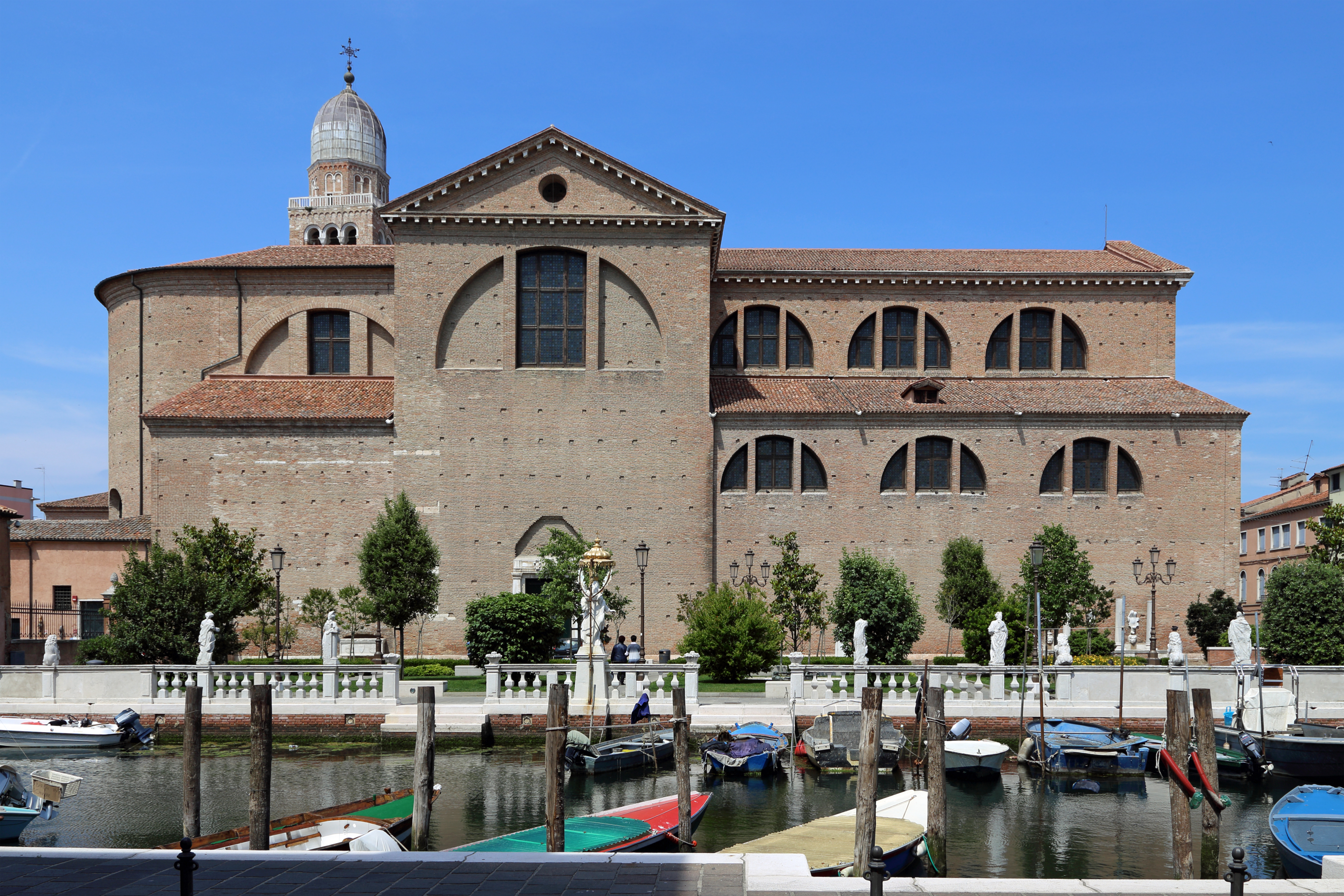
The cathedral seen from the Canal de Perottolo

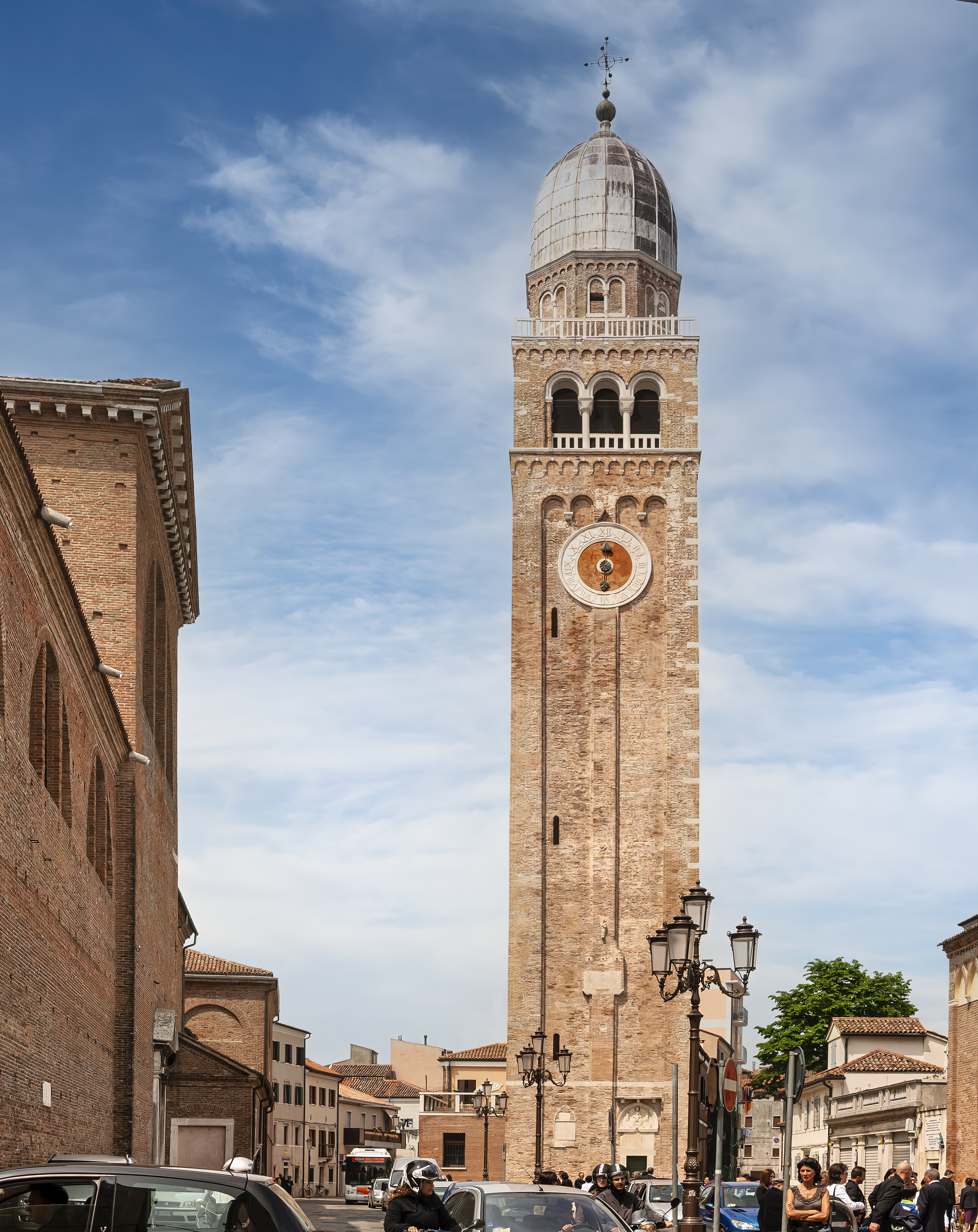
Bell tower

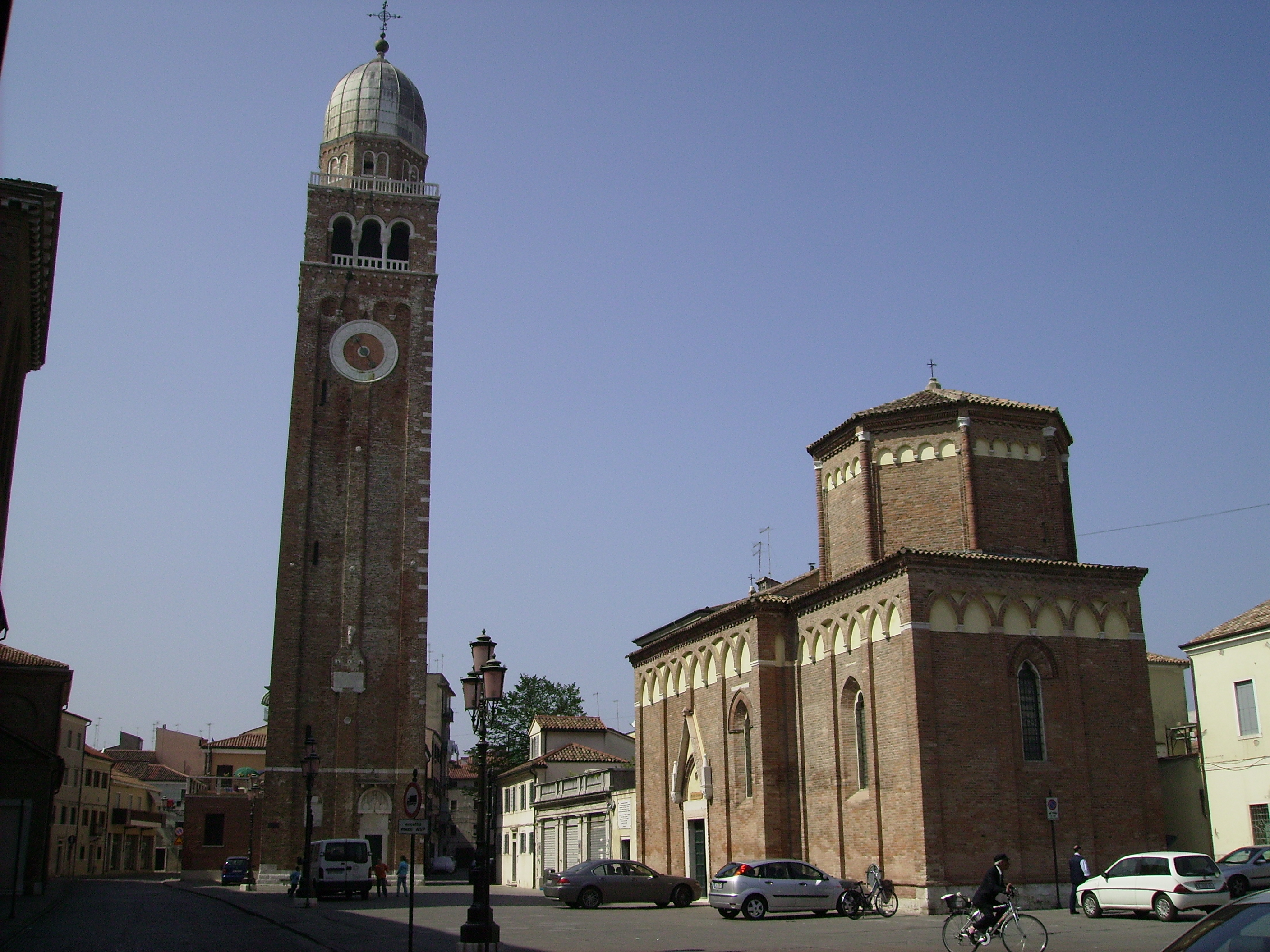
Bell tower and church of San Martino

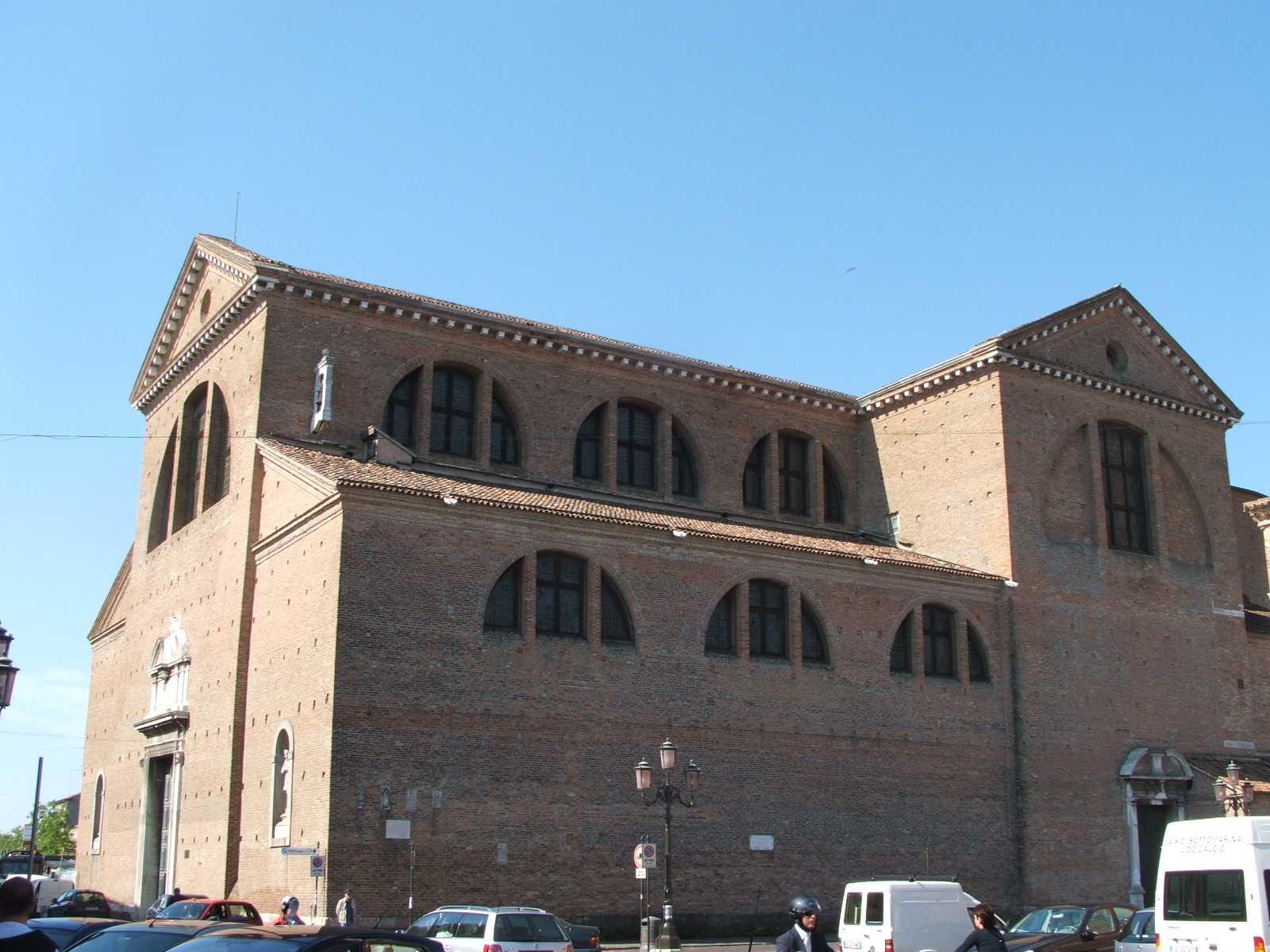
Front of the cathedral

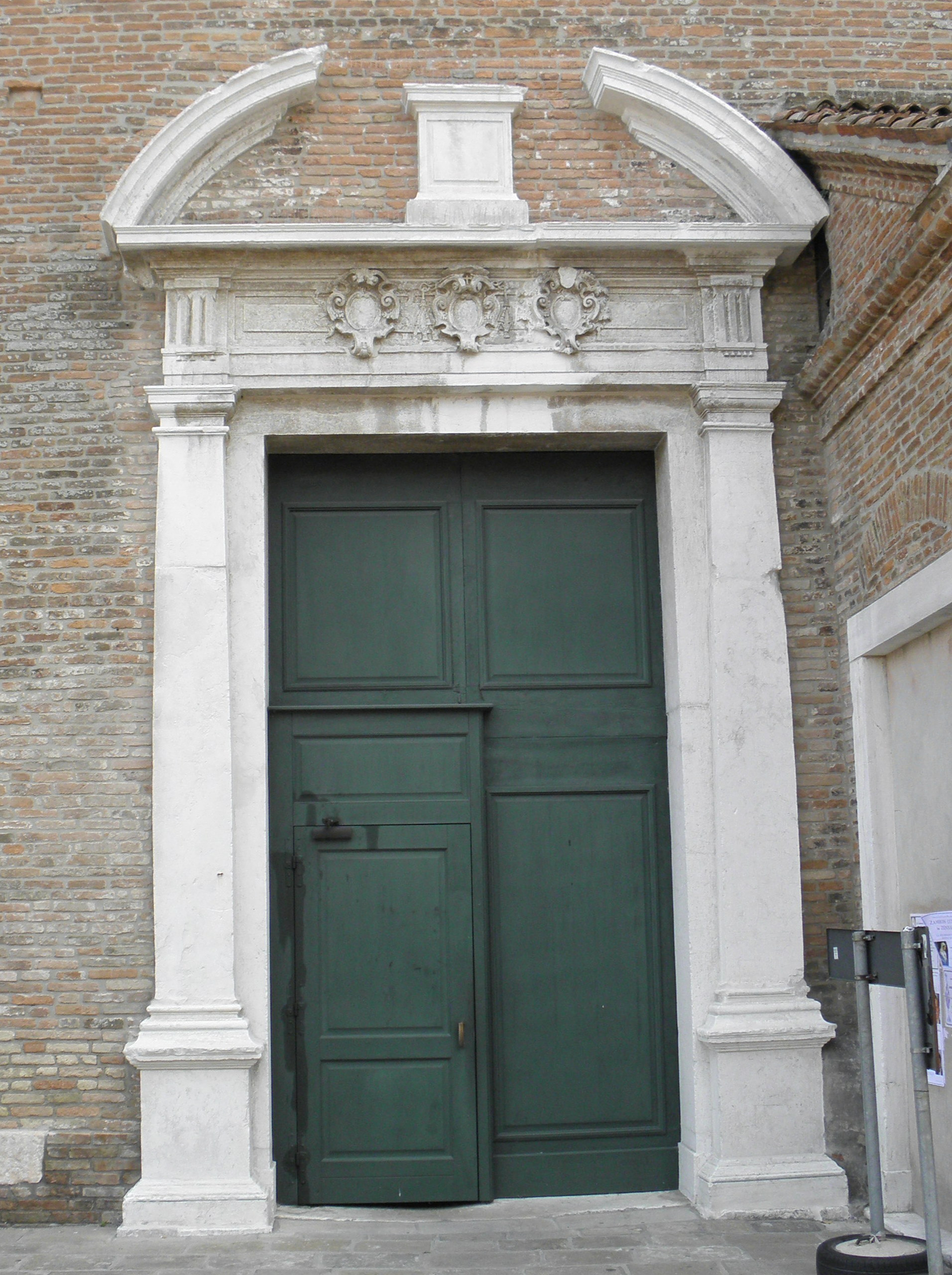
Portal on the side of the building

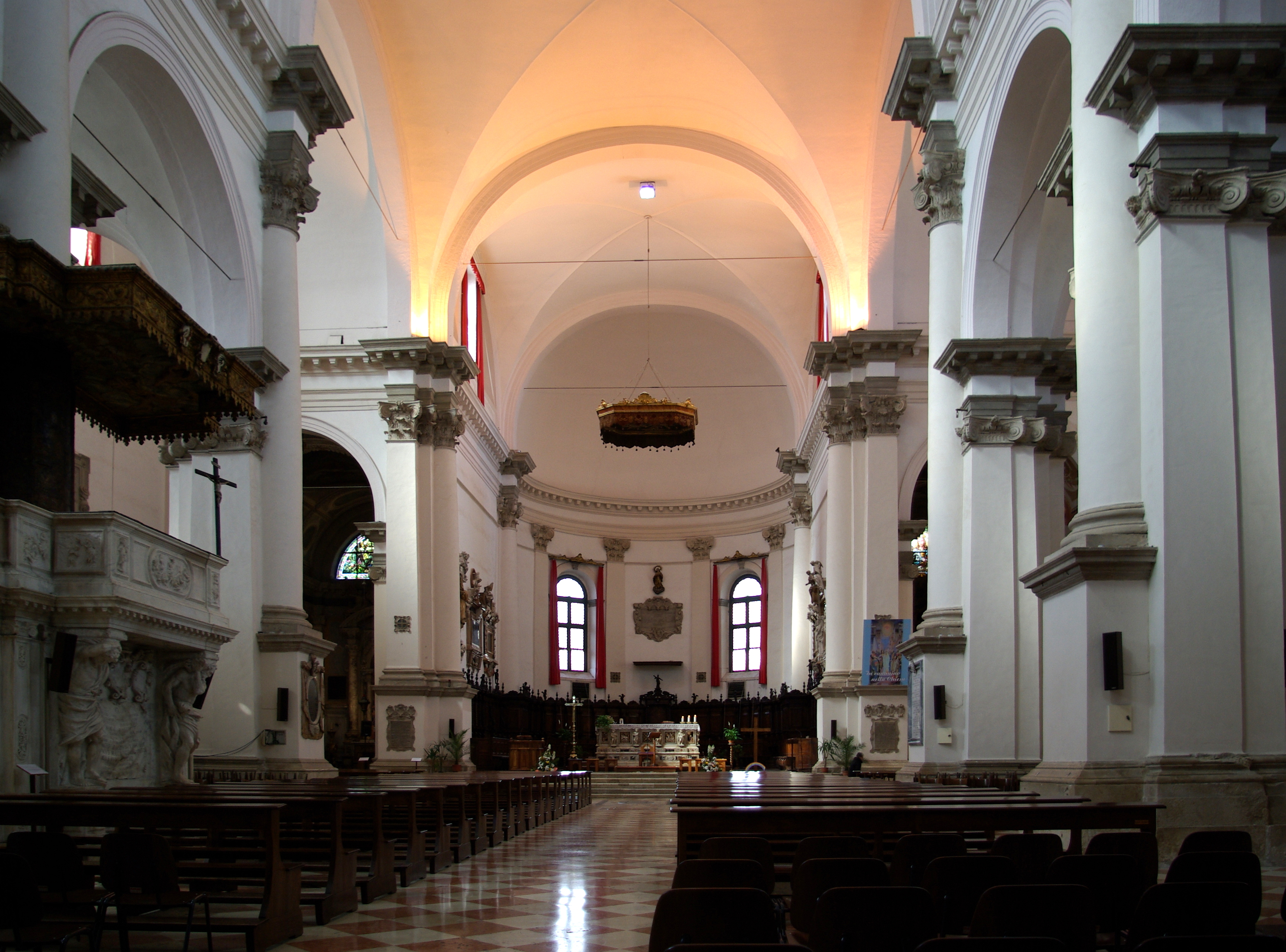
Interior

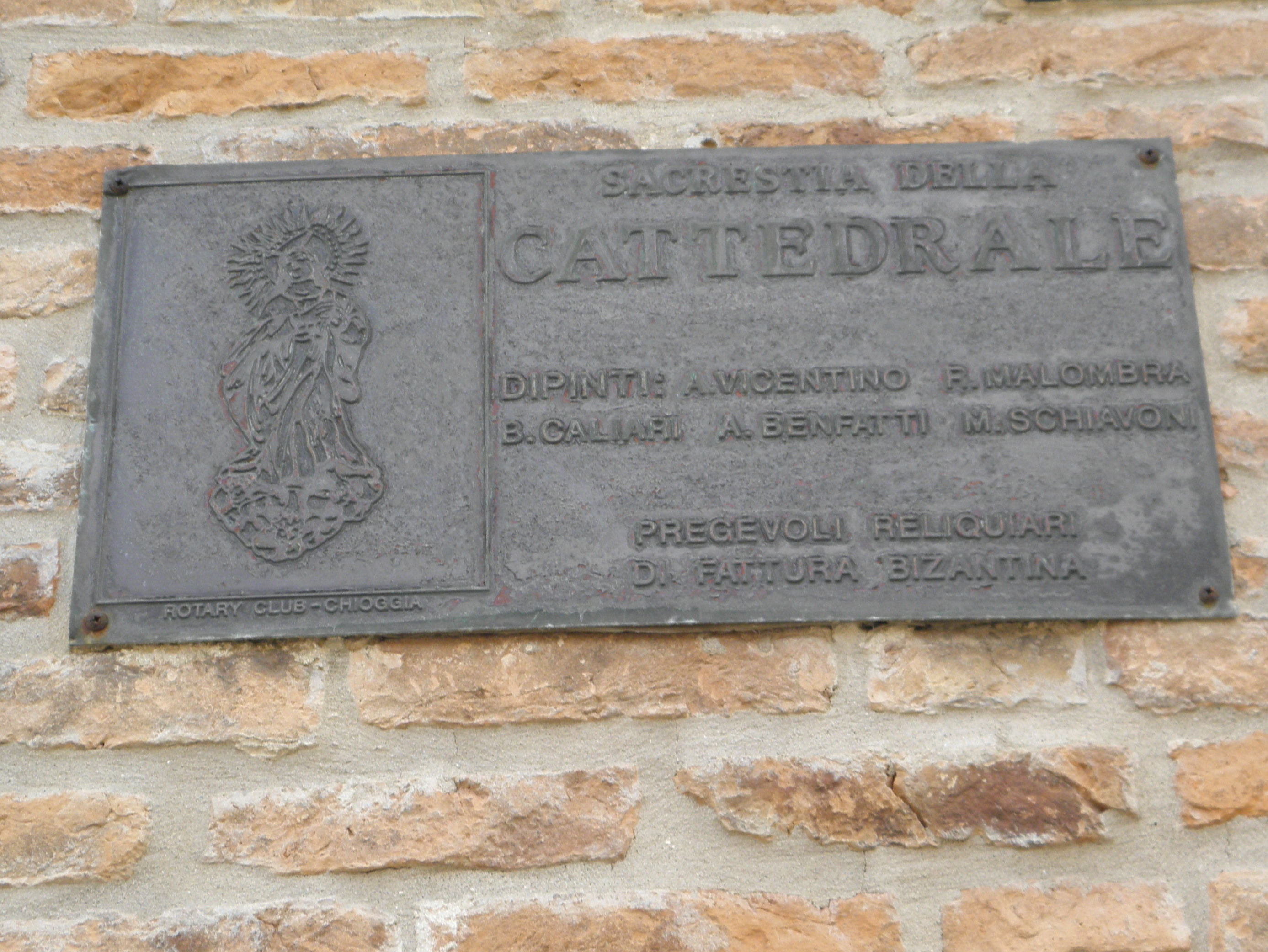
Tourist plaque

== Sources ==
- Goy, Richard J. (1985-09-26). Chioggia and the Villages of the Venetian Lagoon: Studies in Urban History. Cambridge University Press. p. 14. ISBN 978-0-521-30275-3.
- "La Cattedrale di Santa Maria Assunta". Diocesi di Chioggia.
- "Santa Maria Assunta Cathedral (Chioggia)". My Best Planet. Archived from the original on 2014-10-29.
