= The Last Supper (Ribera) =

1651 oil on canvas painting by Jusepe de Ribera

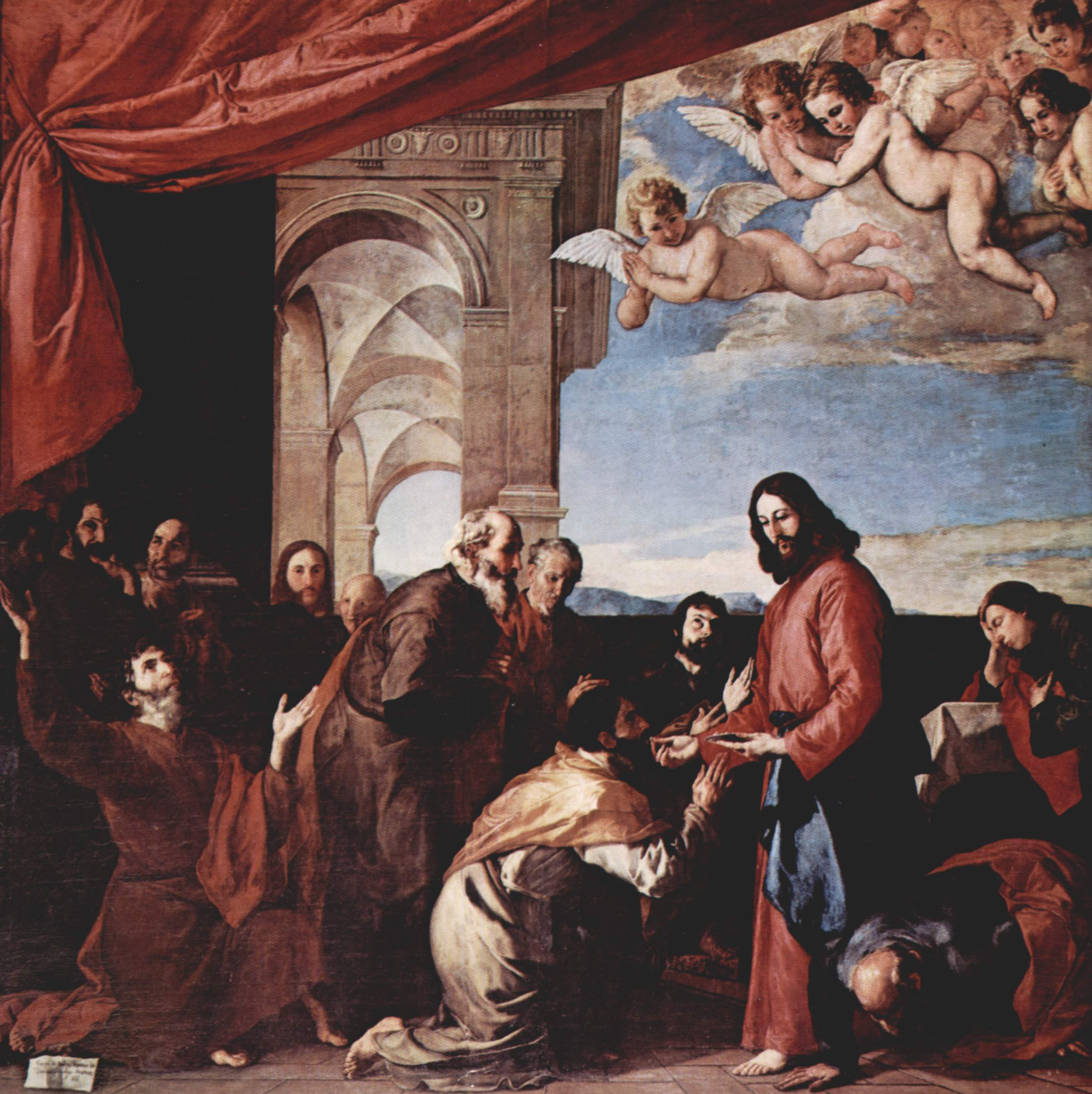

The Last Supper or The Communion of the Apostles is a 1651 oil on canvas painting by Jusepe de Ribera, still in the choir of the Certosa di San Martino in Naples, for which it was commissioned.

== History ==
It was commissioned by Giovan Battista Pisante, the Certosa's prior, to complete the cycle of paintings decorating its church's choir. That cycle already included Adoration of the Shepherds (1642) by Guido Reni along the front, The Last Supper (1589) by Paolo Veronese and The Passover of the Hebrews (1639) by Massimo Stanzione along the right side and Christ Washes the Disciples' Feet (1622) by Battistello Caracciolo and Ribera's painting along the left side.

He was commissioned in 1638 for the sum of 1,000 ducats. The overall scheme for the Certosa church also included Ribera's fourteen Prophets for the church's nave and Saint Jerome, Saint Sebastian and Saint Bruno Receiving the Rule for the prior's private quarters, for a total commission of around 2,160 ducats. Due to several other commissions (and from 1640 a serious illness) he only completed and delivered the commission in 1651.

After Ribera's death his heirs filed a lawsuit against the Certosa's monks to renegotiate the contract, particularly The Last Supper, arguing for a higher sum thanks to its high quality and large number of figures (initially set as ten at a rate of 100 ducats per full figure but thirteen by the time the work was finished). The Tribunale granted the heirs the higher sum of 1,300 ducats and therefore directed that they be given 300 more ducats.

== Bibliography ==
- (in Italian) Nicola Spinosa, Jusepe de Ribera, in Art e Dossier, n. 66, Giunti Editore, Milano, 1992.
- (in Italian) Nicola Spinosa, Ribera. L'opera completa, Napoli, Electa, 2003.
- (in Italian) Nicola Spinosa, Pittura del Seicento a Napoli - da Caravaggio a Massimo Stanzione, Napoli, Arte'm, 2008.
