= Tagliacozzi =

Tagliacozzi (pronounced [taʎʎaˈkɔttsi]) is an Italian surname, derived from the town of Tagliacozzo. Notable people with the surname include:

- Gaspare Tagliacozzi (1545–1599), Italian surgeon
- Giovanni dei Tagliacozzi (died 1540), Italian Roman Catholic prelate
- Nicola Tagliacozzi Canale (1691–1764), Italian architect, engineer, engraver and scenic designer

== See also ==
- Eric Tagliacozzo (born 1967), American historian and academic
