= Averoldi (disambiguation) =

Averoldi is an Italian surname.

Averoldi may also refer to:

- Averoldi Polyptych, a painting by the Italian Renaissance painter Titian
- Palazzo Averoldi, an historic building in Brescia, Italy

== See also ==
- Bartolomeo Averoldi
