= Bartolomeo Averoldi =

Bartolomeo Averoldi may refer to:

- Bartolomeo Averoldi, Archbishop of Split (c. 1430–c. 1503)
- Bartolomeo Averoldi, Bishop of Rethymo (died 1537)

== See also ==
- Averoldi
