= Fiamma =

Fiamma may refer to:

- Fiamma, an Italian name
- Galvano Fiamma (1283–1344), Italian Dominican and chronicler of Milan
- Gabriele Fiamma (1533–1585), Roman Catholic prelate who served as Bishop of Chioggia
- Fiamma Ferragamo (1941–1998), Italian businessperson and shoe designer
- Fiamma Nirenstein (born 1945), Italian-Israeli journalist, author and politician
- Fiamma Smith (born 1962), Guatemalan alpine skier
- Fiamma (footballer) (born 2004), Spanish footballer
- Trebbiano della Fiamma, Italian wine grape
- Movimento Sociale Fiamma Tricolore, neo-fascist political party in Italy
- La fiamma, opera in three acts by Ottorino Respighi
- La misteriosa fiamma della regina Loana, novel by the Italian writer Umberto Eco
- Fiamma of the Right, fictional character from A Certain Magical Index light novel, manga and anime series
- A.S.D. Fiamma Monza 1970, women's football team based in Monza, Lombardy, Italy
- Fiamma che non si spegne, 1949 Italian war drama film
- Bella mia fiamma, addio, concert aria by Wolfgang Amadeus Mozart
- Fiamma Fumana, Italian world music ensemble
- La fiamma sul ghiaccio, 2006 Italian drama film
