= Prophets and Patriarchs (Ribera) =

Series of oil on canvas paintings produced between 1638 and 1643 by Jusepe de Ribera

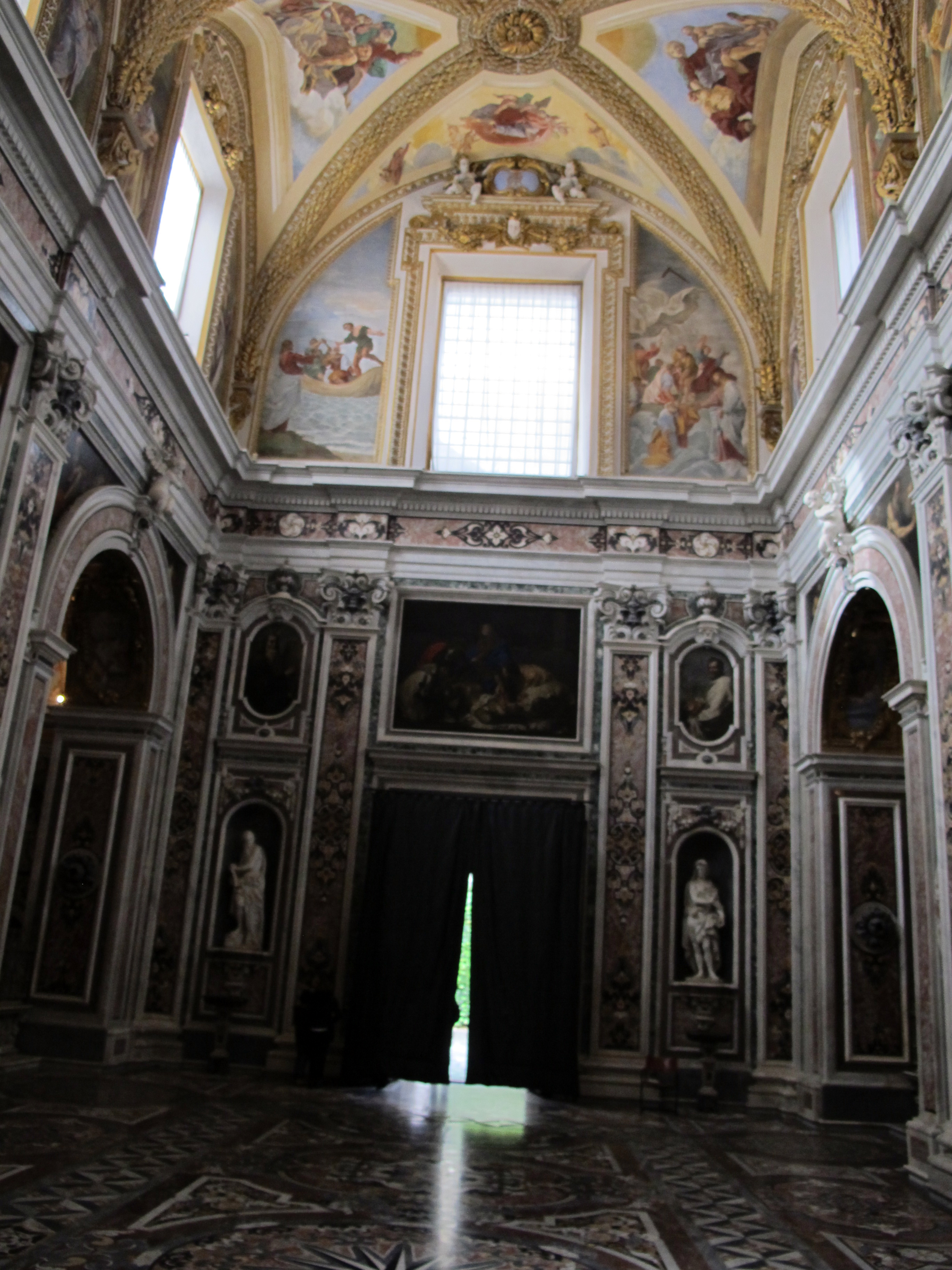

Prophets and Patriarchs is a series of fourteen oil on canvas paintings produced between 1638 and 1643 by Jusepe de Ribera along the nave walls of the church of the Certosa di San Martino in Naples, where they still hang. Moses and Elijah hang behind the west facade, whilst the rest hang under the arches of the side chapels.

== History ==
The work was one of a set of commissions from Ribera by the Certosa beginning in 1638 and also included a Pietà for the sacristy (moved to its current home in the sala del Tesoro Nuovo at the end of the 17th century), The Last Supper for the choir and Saint Jerome, Saint Sebastian and Saint Bruno Receiving the Rule for the prior's private quarters, for a total commission of around 2,160 ducats. He was paid 80 ducats per canvas in the set of twelve works in the side chapels and 50 ducats each for the two on the facade. Moses, Elijah and Noah were the first of the fourteen to be completed, with the others finished in the following five years - the last payment receipt was signed at the end of 1643 and eight of them are initially "J.R." in the bottom corner.

== Catalogue ==
Image	Title	Year	Dimensions	Notes
	Moses	1638	168 × 97 cm	Signed and dated «Jusepe de Ribera espanol / F. 1638».
	Elijah	1638	168 × 97 cm	Signed and dated «Jusepe de Ribera espanol / F. 1638».
	Haggai	1638-1643	272 × 252 cm	
	Noah	1638	271 × 254 cm	Signed and dated«Jusepe de / Ribera es / panol / F. / 1638».
	Joel	1638-1639	270 × 252 cm	Initialled and dated «J.R.a 163...». (Note: The last number from the year is lost)
	Amos	1640	272 × 256 cm	Initialled and dated «J.R.a 1640».
	Obadiah	1638-1643	270 × 266 cm	
	Hosea	1638-1643	270 × 254 cm	Initialled «J.R.a».
	Habakkuk	1638-1643	267 × 236 cm	Initialled «J.R.a».
	Zephaniah	1638-1643	266 × 236 cm	Initialled «J.R.a».
	Daniel	1638-1643	267 × 236 cm	Initialled «J.R.a».
	Jonah	1638-1643	276 × 236 cm	Initialled «J.R.a».
	Micah	1638-1643	268 × 243 cm	Siglato «J.R.».
	Ezekiel	1638-1643	271 × 251 cm	

== Bibliography ==
- (in Italian) N. Spinosa, Ribera. L'opera completa, Napoli, Electa, 2003.
- (in Italian) N. Spinosa, Jusepe de Ribera, Milano, Giunti Editore, 1992.
