= Santa Maria ad Ogni Bene dei Sette Dolori =

Coordinates: 40.844970°N 14.245050°E

- Chiesa di Santa Maria ad Ogni Bene dei Sette Dolori
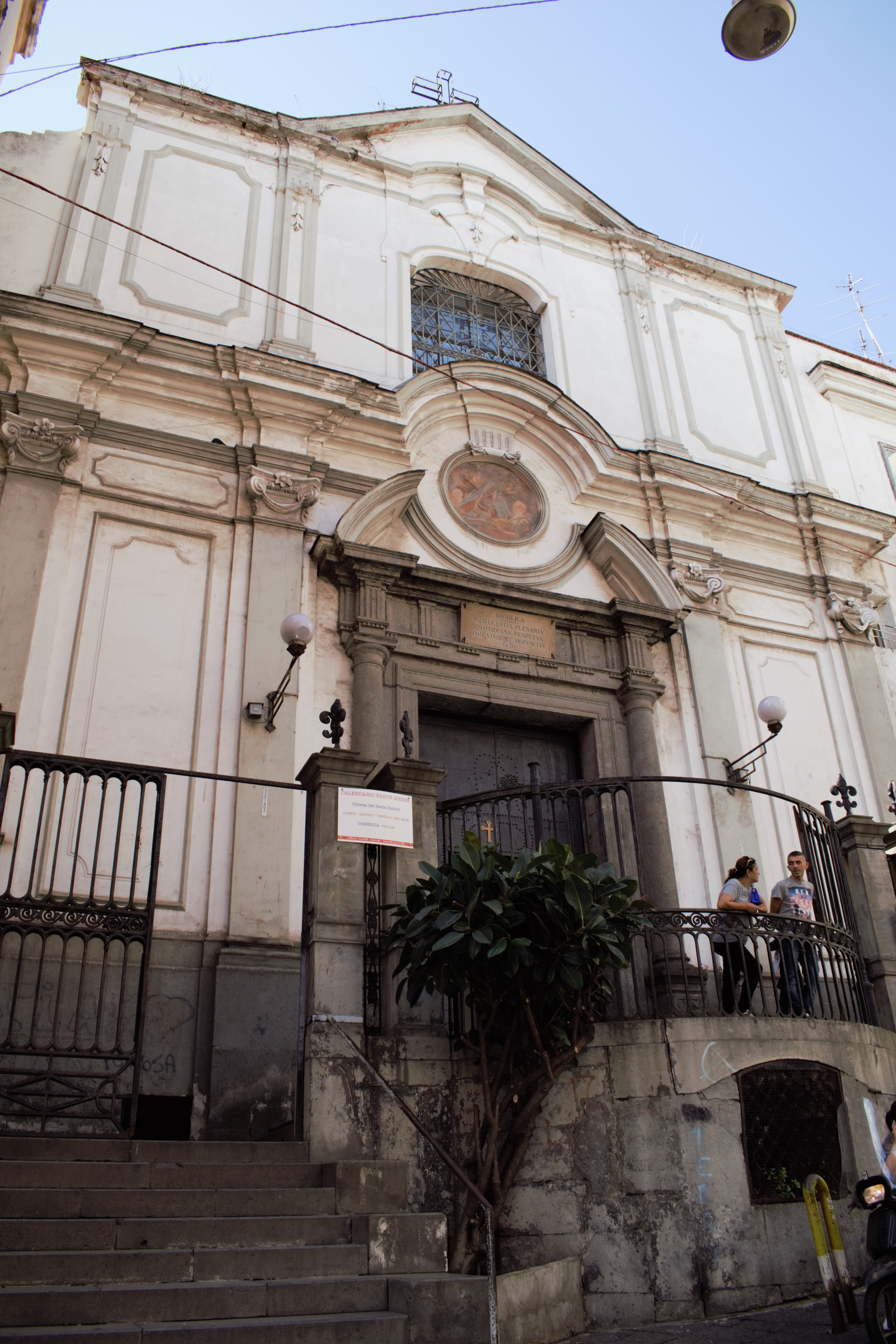
- The façade.
- Santa Maria ad Ogni Bene dei Sette Dolori
- Location: Naples
- Country: Italy
- Denomination: Roman Catholic

Architecture
- Architectural type: Church

Administration
- Diocese: Roman Catholic Archdiocese of Naples

Santa Maria ad Ogni Bene dei Sette Dolori, also known as Santa Maria de Sette Dolori, is a Roman Catholic church in Naples, Italy. It stands on a hill, providing an excellent view of Spaccanapoli, a Decumanus of Naples which ends across via Francesco Girardi. From the door of the church, one has a direct view across Naples through the straight decumanus. The church also faces the former convent of Santissima Trinità delle Monache.

== History ==
In 1411, a shrine with a statue of the Virgin was converted by the locals into a chapel called Santa Maria d'Ognibene (Holy Mary of all gifts). After the plague of 1516, the chapel and statue became a convent and church run by the Servite Order. In 1597, the cardinal Alfonso Carafa made this into a parish church, which was then briefly attached to the Congregation of Pii Operari, which had been started by Carlo Carafa. It was retransferred to the Servites, and remained so till 1809, till the monks were expelled. When they left, they took with them the statue of the Addolorata.

The church and the Servite order were attached to a form of Marian devotion centered around the sette dolori, which roughly translates to the seven sorrows, of the Maria Addolorata (Our Lady of Sorrows). These sorrows are roughly identified from scriptural interpretations.

When the cholera struck Naples in 1836, the parish retrieved the statue and in 1837 placed it on the main altar. The church in 1849 was named a minor basilica by Pope Pius IX.

The church we see now was mainly built starting 1640, by designs of Giovanni Cola Cocco. Other sources attribute the work to Nicola Tagliacozzi Canale. A number of artworks are associated with the church. The first chapel on right had a Christ heals the lame San Pellegrino Laziosi by Paolo de Matteis, with two lateral paintings by Carlo, the son of Nicola Malinconico. In the fourth chapel is a canvas depicting St Sebastian by Mattia Preti, and a St Jerome by followers of Ribera. In the first chapel to the left was a Baptism attributed to Silvestro Buono and in the 5th chapel, the Francesco di Paola has been attributed to Marco Cardisco. The famous sculptor and architect Cosimo Fanzago is buried in this church. The repertoire of paintings in the church now differs in many regards from the catalogue of Galante.
