= Angelo Baroni =

Italian Roman Catholic prelate

Most Reverend Angelo Baroni
- Church: Catholic Church
- Diocese: Diocese of Chioggia
- In office: 1611–1612
- Predecessor: Raphael Riva
- Successor: Bartolomeo Cartolario
- Previous post: Bishop of Kotor (1604–1611)

Orders
- Consecration: 22 February 1604 by Girolamo Bernerio

Personal details
- Born: 1553 Venice, Republic of Venice
- Died: November 1612 (age 59) Chioggia, Republic of Venice

Angelo Baroni (1553 – November 1612) was a Roman Catholic prelate who served as Bishop of Chioggia (1611–1612) and Bishop of Kotor (1604–1611).

== Biography ==
Angelo Baroni was born in Venice, Republic of Venice and ordained a priest in the Order of Preachers. On 11 February 1604, he was appointed during the papacy of Pope Clement VIII as Bishop of Kotor. On 22 February 1604, he was consecrated bishop by Girolamo Bernerio, Cardinal-Bishop of Albano, with Agostino Quinzio, Bishop of Korčula, and Gregorio Servanzi, Bishop of Trevico, serving as co-consecrators. On 31 August 1611, he was appointed during the papacy of Pope Paul V as Bishop of Chioggia. He served as Bishop of Chioggia until his death in November 1612.

== External links and additional sources ==
- Cheney, David M. "Diocese of Kotor (Cattaro)". Catholic-Hierarchy.org. (for Chronology of Bishops) ^{[self-published]}
- Chow, Gabriel. "Diocese of Kotor (Croatia)". GCatholic.org. (for Chronology of Bishops) ^{[self-published]}
- Cheney, David M. "Diocese of Chioggia". Catholic-Hierarchy.org. (for Chronology of Bishops) ^{[self-published]}
- Chow, Gabriel. "Diocese of Chioggia (Italy)". GCatholic.org. (for Chronology of Bishops) ^{[self-published]}

Catholic Church titles
Preceded by Girolamo Bucchia	Bishop of Kotor; 1604–1611	Succeeded by Girolamo Rusca
Preceded by Raphael Riva	Bishop of Chioggia; 1611–1612	Succeeded by Bartolomeo Cartolario
