= Antun Belglava =

Roman Catholic bishop (1730–1790)

- Bishop of Trogir (Trau)
- Church: Catholic Church
- See: Bishop of Trogir
- Appointed: 28 September 1787
- Term ended: 20 February 1790
- Predecessor: Johann Anton Miocevich
- Successor: Giovanni Pietro Galzigna
- Other post: Bishop of Curzola

Orders
- Consecration: 30 September 1781 (Bishop) by Federico Maria Giovanelli

Personal details
- Born: 16 April 1730 Zadar, Venetian Republic
- Died: 20 February 1790 (aged 59) Trogir, Venetian Republic

Antun Belglava (Italian: Antonio Belglava, 1730–1790) was bishop of Curzola from 1781 to 1787, and later bishop of Trogir (Trau). He is mainly known for his work of correction of the Glagolitic liturgical books.

== Life ==
Antun Belglava was born in Zadar on 16 April 1730 to a noble family. He studied at the University of Padua. Returned to Zadar, he became chancellor of the diocese, holding also the position of canon of the chapter in Nin. His ecclesiastical career followed with the appointment as protonotary apostolic and, in 1767, he became canon of the chapter of Zadar Cathedral. In Zadar, probably asked by bishop Matteo Caraman, he started a long work in correction of the Glagolitic church books in Croatian recension of Old Church Slavonic.

In 1778, Pope Pius VI offered him to be bishop of Zakynthos, but he gently refused. On 17 September 1781, he was appointed bishop of Curzola. The next 30 September he was consecrated bishop in the patriarchal church of San Pietro di Castello in Venice by Patriarch Federico Maria Giovanelli. He entered Korčula only in November 1782.

On 28 September 1787, he was transferred to the diocese of Trogir (Trau). He died in Trogir (Trau) on 20 February 1790. Due to his ministry, he never succeeded to complete his work of correction of Glagolitic liturgical books.
