= Ludovico Sarego =

Most Reverend Ludovico Sarego
- Bishop Emeritus of Adria
- Church: Catholic Church
- Diocese: Diocese of Adria
- In office: 1612–1622
- Predecessor: Girolamo di Porzia
- Successor: Ubertinus Papafava
- Previous post: Apostolic Nuncio to Switzerland (1613–1621).

Orders
- Consecration: 14 October 1612 by Giovanni Garzia Mellini

Personal details
- Born: 1558 Verona, Italy
- Died: 5 August 1625 (age 65)

Ludovico Sarego (1558 – 5 August 1625) was a Roman Catholic prelate who served as Bishop of Adria (1612–1622) and Apostolic Nuncio to Switzerland (1613–1621).

== Biography ==
Ludovico Sarego was born in Verona, Italy in 1558. On 17 September 1612, he was appointed during the papacy of Pope Paul V as Bishop of Adria. On 14 October 1612, he was consecrated bishop by Giovanni Garzia Mellini, Cardinal-Priest of Santi Quattro Coronati with Coriolani Garzadori, Bishop of Ossero, and Marco Cornaro (bishop), Bishop of Padua, serving as co-consecrators. On 15 September 1613, he was appointed during the papacy of Pope Paul V as Apostolic Nuncio to Switzerland. on 15 April 1621, he resigned as Apostolic Nuncio to Switzerland. on 24 September 1622, he resigned as Bishop of Adria. He died on 5 August 1625.

== Episcopal succession ==
While bishop, he was the principal co-consecrator of:

- Bartolomeo Cartolario, Bishop of Chioggia (1613);
- Andreas Corbelli, Bishop of Canea (1613);
- Vincenzo Bucchi (Buschio), Bishop of Kotor (1622);
- Lazzaro Carafino, Bishop of Melfi e Rapolla (1622);
- Fulgenzio Gallucci, Titular Bishop of Thagaste (1623);
- Eitel Friedrich von Hohenzollern-Sigmaringen, Bishop of Osnabruck (1623); and
- Hyacinthus Arnolfini, Bishop of Milos (1625).

== External links and additional sources ==
- Cheney, David M. "Nunciature to Switzerland". Catholic-Hierarchy.org. (for Chronology of Bishops) ^{[self-published]}
- Chow, Gabriel. "Apostolic Nunciature Switzerland". GCatholic.org. (for Chronology of Bishops) ^{[self-published]}

Catholic Church titles
Preceded by Ladislao d'Aquino	Apostolic Nuncio to Switzerland; 1613–1621	Succeeded by Alessandro Scappi
Preceded by Girolamo di Porzia	Bishop of Adria; 1612–1622	Succeeded by Ubertinus Papafava
