= Roman Catholic Diocese of Retimo–Ario =

Coordinates: 35.2500°N 24.5833°E

The Roman Catholic Diocese of Retimo Latin: Dioecesis Rhithymnensis) was a Roman Catholic diocese located in the town of Rethymo (modern day Rethymno) on the north coast of the island of Crete. It was established around 1250 AD. On 5 November 1551, it was renamed as Diocese of Retimo–Ario (Italian) / Rhithymnensis–Ariensis (Latin) and gained territory from the suppressed Roman Catholic Diocese of Ario.

== Bishops of Rethymo ==
- Luca Grimani, (13 Nov 1409–1418 Appointed, Bishop of Canea)

.....

- Bartolomeo Averoldi (18 Sep 1517–1537 Died)
- Alberto Pascaleo de Utino, O.P. (29 Oct 1537–1540 Appointed, Bishop of Chioggia)

.....

== Bishops of Rethymo-Ario ==
.....

- Timoteo Giustiniani, O.P. (5 Oct 1551–1564 Appointed, Bishop of Chios)
- Bartolomeo Chiapponi (24 Apr 1564–1581 Died)
- Giulio Carrara (16 May 1582 – 1589 Died)
- Lelio Zanchi (5 Feb 1590–1594 Died)
- Ferdinando D'Avila (Pietro D'Avila) O.F.M. Obs. (4 Mar 1592–1594 Appointed, Bishop of Ascoli Satriano)
- Sebastiano Aroldus, O.F.M. Obs. (9 Mar 1594–1609 Died)
- Luca Stella (15 Jun 1609–Nov 1615 Appointed, Archbishop of Zadar)
- Giovanni Sanctatus, O.P. (27 Jan 1616–1617 Died)
- Stephanus Penulatius, O.S.H. (12 Jun 1617 – )
- Giovanni Francesco Gozzadini (12 Aug 1641 –)

== Titular see ==
With the Ottoman conquest of Crete, around 1650?, the residential diocese was suppressed and listed as titular bishopric of Rhithymna (Latin) / Retimo (Italian).

In 1936, the titular see was suppressed, having has had the following incumbents, all of the lowest (episcopal) rank :

- Francesco Trevisan Suarez (1728.11.15 – 1738.11.24)
- José Ignacio Cienfuegos Arteaga (1828.12.15 – 1832.12.17)
- Marco Antonio Maiz (1844.07.25 – 1848.05.15)
- William Wareing (1858.12.21 – 1865.12.26)
- James David Richards (1871.01.13 – 1893.11.30)
- Paul Pellet, Society of African Missions (S.M.A.) (1895.01.15 – 1914.03.11)
- Americo Bevilacqua (1915.01.22 – 1918.02.02), previously Bishop of Alatri (Italy) (1909.04.29 – 1915.01.22); later Titular Archbishop of Scythopolis (1918.02.02 – death 1926.03.20)
- António Antunes (1919.09.12 – 1936.03.01)
