= Silvestro Daziari =

Roman bishop

Most Reverend Silvestro Daziari
- Bishop of Chioggia
- Church: Catholic Church
- In office: 1480–1486
- Predecessor: Nicolas Inversi
- Successor: Bernardino Fenier

Orders
- Consecration: 3 April 1480

Personal details
- Died: 1486

Silvestro Daziari (died 1486) was a Roman Catholic prelate who served as Bishop of Chioggia (1480–1486).

== Biography ==
On 24 January 1480, Silvestro Daziari was appointed during the papacy of Pope Sixtus IV as Bishop of Chioggia. On 3 April 1480, he was consecrated bishop. He served as Bishop of Chioggia until his death in 1486.

== External links and additional sources ==
- Cheney, David M. "Diocese of Chioggia". Catholic-Hierarchy.org. (for Chronology of Bishops) ^{[self-published]}
- Chow, Gabriel. "Diocese of Chioggia (Italy)". GCatholic.org. (for Chronology of Bishops) ^{[self-published]}

Catholic Church titles
Preceded by Nicolas Inversi	Bishop of Chioggia; 1480–1486	Succeeded by Bernardino Fenier
