= Marco Medici =

Roman Catholic bishop (died 1583)

Most Reverend Marco Medici
- Bishop of Chioggia
- Church: Catholic Church
- Diocese: Diocese of Chioggia
- In office: 1578–1583
- Predecessor: Girolamo Negri (bishop)
- Successor: Gabriele Fiamma

Personal details
- Died: 30 August 1583

Marco Medici, O.P. (died 1583) was a Roman Catholic prelate who served as Bishop of Chioggia (1578–1583).

== Biography ==
Marco Medici was ordained a priest in the Order of Preachers. On 15 December 1578, he was appointed during the papacy of Pope Gregory XIII as Bishop of Chioggia. He served as Bishop of Chioggia until his death on 30 August 1583.

== External links and additional sources ==
- Cheney, David M. "Diocese of Chioggia". Catholic-Hierarchy.org. (for Chronology of Bishops) ^{[self-published]}
- Chow, Gabriel. "Diocese of Chioggia (Italy)". GCatholic.org. (for Chronology of Bishops) ^{[self-published]}

Catholic Church titles
Preceded by Girolamo Negri (bishop)	Bishop of Chioggia; 1578–1583	Succeeded by Gabriele Fiamma
