= Pontifical Roman Major Seminary =

Major seminary of the Diocese of Rome

- Italian: Pontificio Seminario Romano Maggiore
- Type: Major seminary
- Established: 1565; 461 years ago
- Founder: Pope Pius IV
- Parent institution: Diocese of Rome
- Religious affiliation: Catholic Church
- Rector: Michele Di Tolve
- Location: Rome, Italy

The Pontifical Roman Major Seminary (Italian: Pontificio Seminario Romano Maggiore) is the major seminary of the Diocese of Rome. It is located at the Archbasilica of Saint John Lateran. Since 2017, the rector of the seminary has been Gabriele Faraghini, a priest of the Little Brothers of Jesus Caritas.

== History ==
The Council of Trent in its 23rd session decreed the establishment of diocesan seminaries. The Roman Seminary was established by Pope Pius IV in 1565. Although its administration was entrusted to the Society of Jesus, and the pupils studied at the Collegio Romano, founded by Ignatius of Loyola in 1551, these students were intended to serve as diocesan priests in Rome, rather than join the Jesuits. Over the course of time the Roman Seminary occupied a number of different locations.

The residence was changed several times before 1608, when they settled in the Palazzo Borromeo in the Via del Seminario (now 'Collegio Bellarmino', a residence for Jesuit priests, students at the Gregorian University). Each year, at Pentecost, a student delivered a discourse on the Holy Ghost in the papal chapel.

After the suppression of the Jesuits in 1773, direction of the seminary was under the care of diocesan priests and installed in the Collegio Romano of the Jesuits. After the changes in 1798 the number of the students, generally about 100, came down to 9. Pope Pius VII restored the seminary which continued to occupy the Collegio Romano until 1824, when Pope Leo XII returned this building to the Jesuits and transferred the seminary to the Palazzo di Sant'Apollinare, formerly occupied by the Collegium Germanicum et Hungaricum; the seminary, however, retained its own schools comprising a classical course, and a faculty of philosophy and theology, to which in 1856 a course of canon law was added. The direction of the seminary and, as a rule, the chairs were reserved to the secular clergy. After the departure of the Jesuits in 1848 the seminary again removed to the Collegio Romano.

The Roman Seminary included not only young men who had already decided to become priests, but also younger boys still not sure of their vocation, and while the training of the former concentrated on the need for study and the practice of strict piety, the second needed a different formation, with training and pious exercises appropriate to their age.

On 29 June 1913, Pope Pius X issued the Apostolic Constitution "In præcipuis", promulgating the new regulations concerning the training of the Roman and Italian clergy. The Roman Seminary was divided into major and minor sections. The major seminary merged with the Pontificio Seminario Pio and the Seminario Lombardo dei SS. Ambrogio e Carlo and became the Pontificio Seminario Romano Maggiore (Pontifical Roman Major Seminary), with headquarters in a new building at the Archbasilica of Saint John Lateran. The law department was transferred to the Collegio Leoniano, but remained a school of the Seminary. The minor seminary merged with the Vatican Seminary to form the Pontificio Seminario Romano Minore. The Lombardo was merged temporarily with the Roman Seminary from 1913 to 1920, when it was re-established as a separate college.

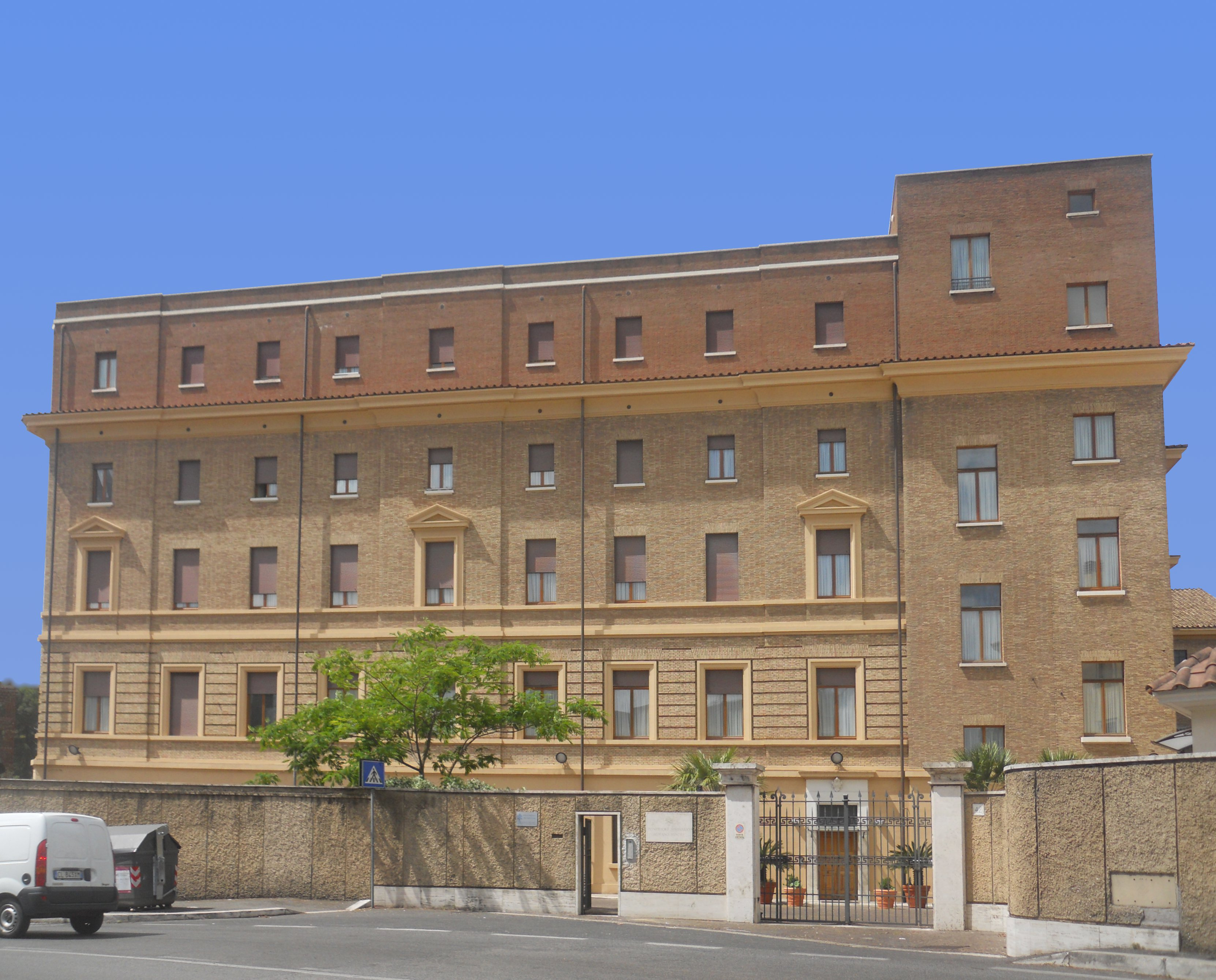
Pontificio Seminario Romano Minore

The Collegio Cerasoli with four burses for students of the Diocese of Bergamo endowed by Cardinal Cerasoli, is connected with the seminary. The students take part in the ceremonies in the church of the Seminario Pio.

Gregory XV, Clement IX, Innocent XIII, Clement XII, and John XXIII received part of their formation in this seminary.

During the Second World War, the Lateran and its related buildings provided a safe haven from the Nazis and Italian Fascists for numbers of Jews and other refugees. Among those who found shelter there were Alcide De Gasperi, Pietro Nenni, Giorgio Del Vecchio, and others. The Daughters of Charity of Saint Vincent de Paul and the sixty orphan refugees they cared for were ordered to leave their convent on the Via Carlo Emanuele. The Sisters of Maria Bambina, who staffed the kitchen at the Pontifical Major Roman Seminary offered a wing of their convent. The grounds also housed Italian soldiers. Fathers Vincenzo Fagiolo and Pietro Palazzini, vice-rector of the seminary, were recognized by Yad Vashem for their efforts to assistance Jews.

On 28 October 1958, the election of Angelo Roncalli, a former pupil of the Roman Seminary, as Pope John XXIII was a source of joy for the seminary community. John XXIII expressed his appreciation and support for the Seminary by visiting it on 27 November 1958, just one month after his election as Pope.

In 2013 the enrollment was seventy seminarians. The course of study is six years. The first two years correspond to philosophy studies oriented to self-understanding and discernment, and to understanding the self and the vocation. In the third year the seminarian takes the formal decision to enter Orders. In the remaining three years (lectorate, acolythate, diaconate) the role of the pastor is gradually emphasized. Twice a week students participate in pastoral activities in Rome in parishes, hospitals, prisons, and centers of assistance.

== Our Lady of Trust ==
The patroness of the Pontifical Major Roman Seminary is the Blessed Virgin Mary under the title Our Lady of Confidence. Pope John Paul II started the custom of a papal visit to the seminary on her feast day, the last Saturday before Lent.

== See also ==
- List of Jesuit sites
