= Francesco Pisani (bishop) =

Italian Roman Catholic prelate

Most Reverend Francesco Pisani
- Archbishop of Chioggia
- Church: Catholic Church
- Diocese: Diocese of Chioggia
- In office: 1569–1572
- Predecessor: Giacomo Nacchianti
- Successor: Girolamo Negri (bishop)
- Previous post: Archbishop of Naxos (1564–1569)

Personal details
- Died: 8 February 1572

Francesco Pisani (died 1572) was a Roman Catholic prelate who served as Archbishop (Personal Title) of Chioggia (1569–1572) and Archbishop of Naxos (1564–1569).

== Biography ==
On 15 December 1564, Francesco Pisani was appointed during the papacy of Pope Pius IV as Archbishop of Naxos. On 19 July 1569, he was appointed during the papacy of Pope Pius V as Archbishop (Personal Title) of Chioggia. He served as Bishop of Chioggia until his death on 8 February 1572.

== Episcopal succession ==
While bishop, he was the principal consecrator of:

- Miler Magrath, Bishop of Down and Connor (1565);
- Nicolas Ugrinovich, Bishop of Smederevo (1565);
- Beatus di Porta, Bishop of Chur (1565);
- Luca Antonio Resta, Bishop of Castro di Puglia (1565);

and the principal co-consecrator of:

- Aloysius Delfino, Bishop of Canea (1565).

== External links and additional sources ==
- Cheney, David M. "Archdiocese of Naxos, Andros, Tinos e Mykonos". Catholic-Hierarchy.org. (for Chronology of Bishops) ^{[self-published]}
- Chow, Gabriel. "Metropolitan Archdiocese of Naxos–Andros–Tinos–Mykonos (Greece)". GCatholic.org. (for Chronology of Bishops) ^{[self-published]}
- Cheney, David M. "Diocese of Chioggia". Catholic-Hierarchy.org. (for Chronology of Bishops) ^{[self-published]}
- Chow, Gabriel. "Diocese of Chioggia (Italy)". GCatholic.org. (for Chronology of Bishops) ^{[self-published]}

Catholic Church titles
Preceded by Antonio Giustiniani	Archbishop of Naxos; 1564–1569	Succeeded by Domenico di Grammatica
Preceded by Giacomo Nacchianti	Archbishop (Personal Title) of Chioggia; 1569–1572	Succeeded by Girolamo Negri (bishop)
