= Saint Jerome (Ribera) =

Painting by Jusepe de Ribera

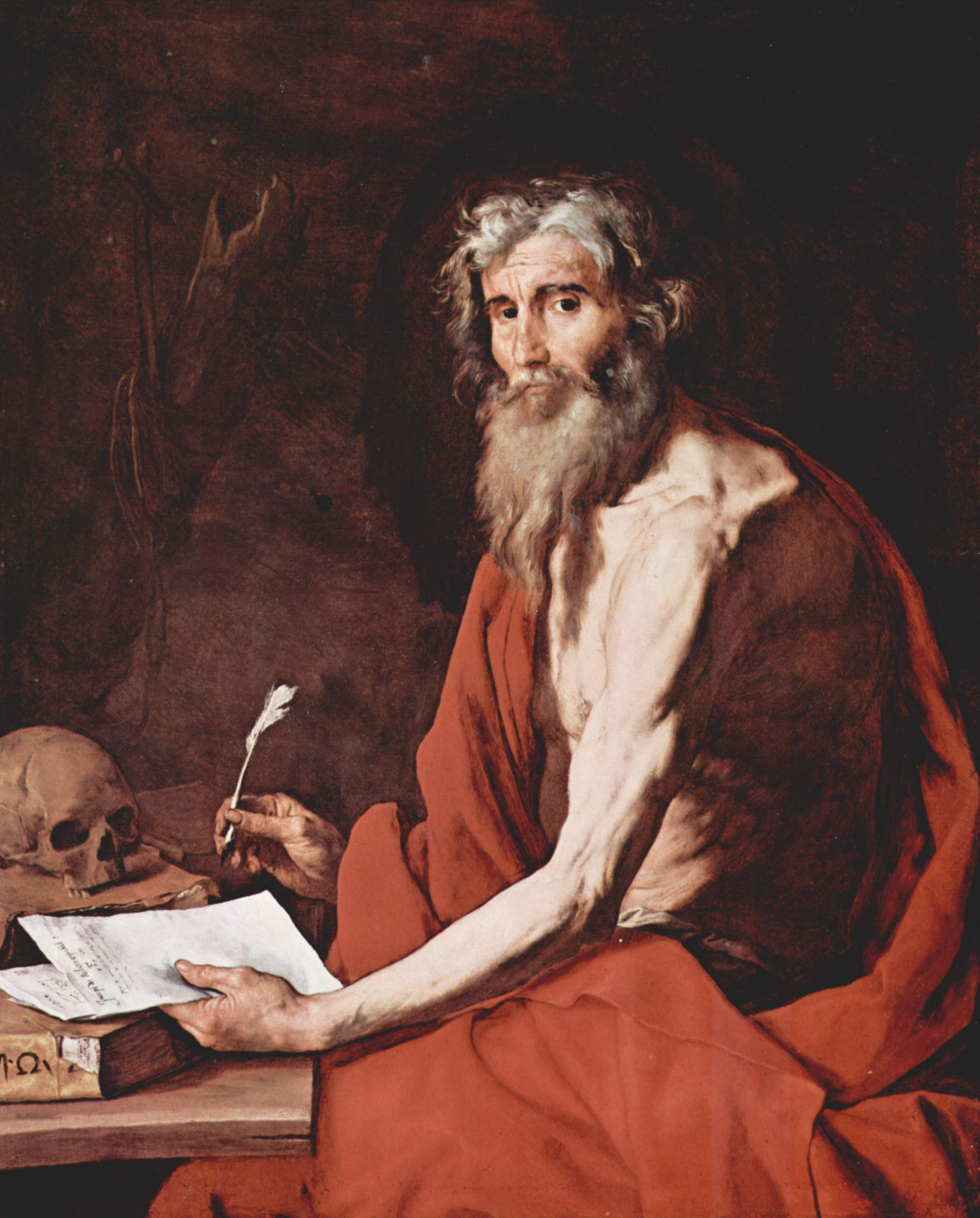

Saint Jerome is a 1651 oil on canvas painting by Jusepe de Ribera. With Saint Sebastian and Saint Bruno Receiving the Rule, it forms a set of three paintings commissioned from him for the private quarters of the prior of the Certosa di San Martino in Naples, where they still hang. Shown here translating the Vulgate Bible, the saint was one of the artist's most popular subjects - his Saint Jerome and the Angel of Judgement (Museo di Capodimonte) and Saint Jerome Reading (Gallerie dell'Accademia) are both also in Naples.
