= Alberto Pascaleo =

16th-century Catholic bishop

Most Reverend Alberto Pascaleo
- Bishop of Chioggia
- Church: Catholic Church
- Diocese: Diocese of Chioggia
- In office: 1540–1543
- Predecessor: Giovanni dei Tagliacozzi
- Successor: Jacopo Nacchianti
- Previous post: Bishop of Rethymo (1540–1543)

Personal details
- Died: December 1543

Alberto Pascaleo, O.P. or Alberto Pascaleo de Utino (died 1543) was a Roman Catholic prelate who served as Bishop of Chioggia (1540–1543) and Bishop of Rethymo (1540–1543).

== Biography ==
Alberto Pascaleo was ordained a priest in the Order of Preachers. On 29 October 1537, he was appointed during the papacy of Pope Paul III as Bishop of Rethymo. On 5 November 1540, he was appointed during the papacy of Pope Paul III as Bishop of Chioggia. He served as Bishop of Chioggia until his death in December 1543.

Catholic Church titles
Preceded by Bartolomeo Averoldi	Bishop of Rethymo; 1540–1543	Succeeded by
Preceded by Giovanni dei Tagliacozzi	Bishop of Chioggia; 1540–1543	Succeeded by Jacopo Nacchianti
