= Lorenzo Prezzato =

Italian Roman Catholic prelate

Most Reverend Lorenzo Prezzato
- Bishop of Chioggia
- Church: Catholic Church
- Diocese: Diocese of Chioggia
- In office: 1601-1610
- Predecessor: Massimiliano Beniamino
- Successor: Raphael Riva

Orders
- Consecration: 12 June 1601 by Girolamo Bernerio

Personal details
- Born: 1555 Venice, Republic of Venice
- Died: 29 October 1610 (age 55) Chioggia, Republic of Venice

Lorenzo Prezzato (1555 – 29 October 1610) was a Roman Catholic prelate who served as Bishop of Chioggia (1601–1610).

== Biography ==
Lorenzo Prezzato was born in Venice, Republic of Venice in 1555. On 4 June 1601, Lorenzo Prezzato was appointed during the papacy of Pope Clement VIII as Bishop of Chioggia. On 12 June 1601, he was consecrated bishop by Girolamo Bernerio, Bishop of Ascoli Piceno, with Aurelio Novarini, Archbishop of Dubrovnik, and Raffaele Inviziati, Bishop of Cefalonia e Zante, serving as co-consecrators. He served as Bishop of Chioggia until his death on 29 October 1610.

== External links and additional sources ==
- Cheney, David M. "Diocese of Chioggia". Catholic-Hierarchy.org. (for Chronology of Bishops) ^{[self-published]}
- Chow, Gabriel. "Diocese of Chioggia (Italy)". GCatholic.org. (for Chronology of Bishops) ^{[self-published]}

Catholic Church titles
Preceded by Massimiliano Beniamino	Bishop of Chioggia; 1601–1610	Succeeded by Raphael Riva
