= Bartolomeo Cartolario =

Italian Roman Catholic prelate

Most Reverend Bartolomeo Cartolario
- Bishop of Chioggia
- Church: Catholic Church
- Diocese: Diocese of Chioggia
- In office: 1613–1614
- Predecessor: Angelo Baroni
- Successor: Pietro Paolo Miloto

Orders
- Consecration: 17 February 1613 by Giovanni Delfino

Personal details
- Died: November 1614 Chioggia, Italy

Bartolomeo Cartolario (died November 1614) was a Roman Catholic prelate who served as Bishop of Chioggia (1613–1614).

== Biography ==
On 11 February 1613, Bartolomeo Cartolario was appointed during the papacy of Pope Paul V as Bishop of Chioggia. On 17 February 1613, he was consecrated bishop by Giovanni Delfino, Cardinal-Priest of San Marco; with Ludovico Sarego, Bishop of Adria, and Coriolani Garzadoro, Bishop of Ossero, serving as co-consecrators. He served as Bishop of Chioggia until his death in November 1614.

== External links and additional sources ==
- Cheney, David M. "Diocese of Chioggia". Catholic-Hierarchy.org. (for Chronology of Bishops) ^{[self-published]}
- Chow, Gabriel. "Diocese of Chioggia (Italy)". GCatholic.org. (for Chronology of Bishops) ^{[self-published]}

Catholic Church titles
Preceded by Angelo Baroni	Bishop of Chioggia; 1613–1614	Succeeded by Pietro Paolo Miloto
