= Giacomo Nacchiante =

Italian Dominican theologian

Most Reverend Giacomo Nacchiante
- Bishop of Chioggia
- Church: Catholic Church
- In office: 1544-1569
- Predecessor: Alberto Pascaleo
- Successor: Francesco Pisani

Personal details
- Born: 15 October 1502 Florence, Italy
- Died: 6 May 1569 (age 51) Chioggia, Italy

Giacomo Nacchiante, O.P. (Jacopo Nacchianti, Naclantus) (born 1502 at Florence; died at Chioggia, 6 May 1569) was an Italian Dominican theologian who was Bishop of Chioggia (1544-1569).

== Early Biography ==
Giacomo Nacchiante was born in Florence, Italy. He was placed by his father under the protection of the superintendent of the Ospedale degli Innocenti, Florence's foundling hospital, in 1509.

== Formation ==
Nacchiante joined the Dominican Order at the convent of San Marco, in Florence. He studied at Bologna, where Michael Ghislieri, afterwards Pope Pius V, was his fellow-student.

== Career ==
In 1541, Nacchiante was appointed professor of philosophy and theology at the Roman studium of the Dominican Order at Santa Maria sopra Minerva, which had developed out of the studium provinciale at Santa Sabina, and which later developed into the Pontifical University of Saint Thomas Aquinas, Angelicum.

Pope Paul III made him Bishop of Chioggia on 30 January 1544. At the Council of Trent, he made a vigorous protest against the words of the decree of the IV Session (8 April 1546), which asserts that the traditions of the church are to be received with the same reverence and piety as the scriptures, but he gave assent to the decree, when he saw it confirmed by the assembly. Further serious suspicions of his orthodoxy seem afterwards to have arisen, and the papal secretary at the Council of Trent, Angelo Massarelli, undertook an Inquisition. The records of the parallel Venetian Inquisition of Nacchiante's orthodoxy can be found in the Venetian state archives. As Pallavicino remarks, Pope Pius IV assigned to him grave affairs of trust, and he returned to the second and third sessions of the Council of Trent as a full participant in the Council's debates.

== Works ==
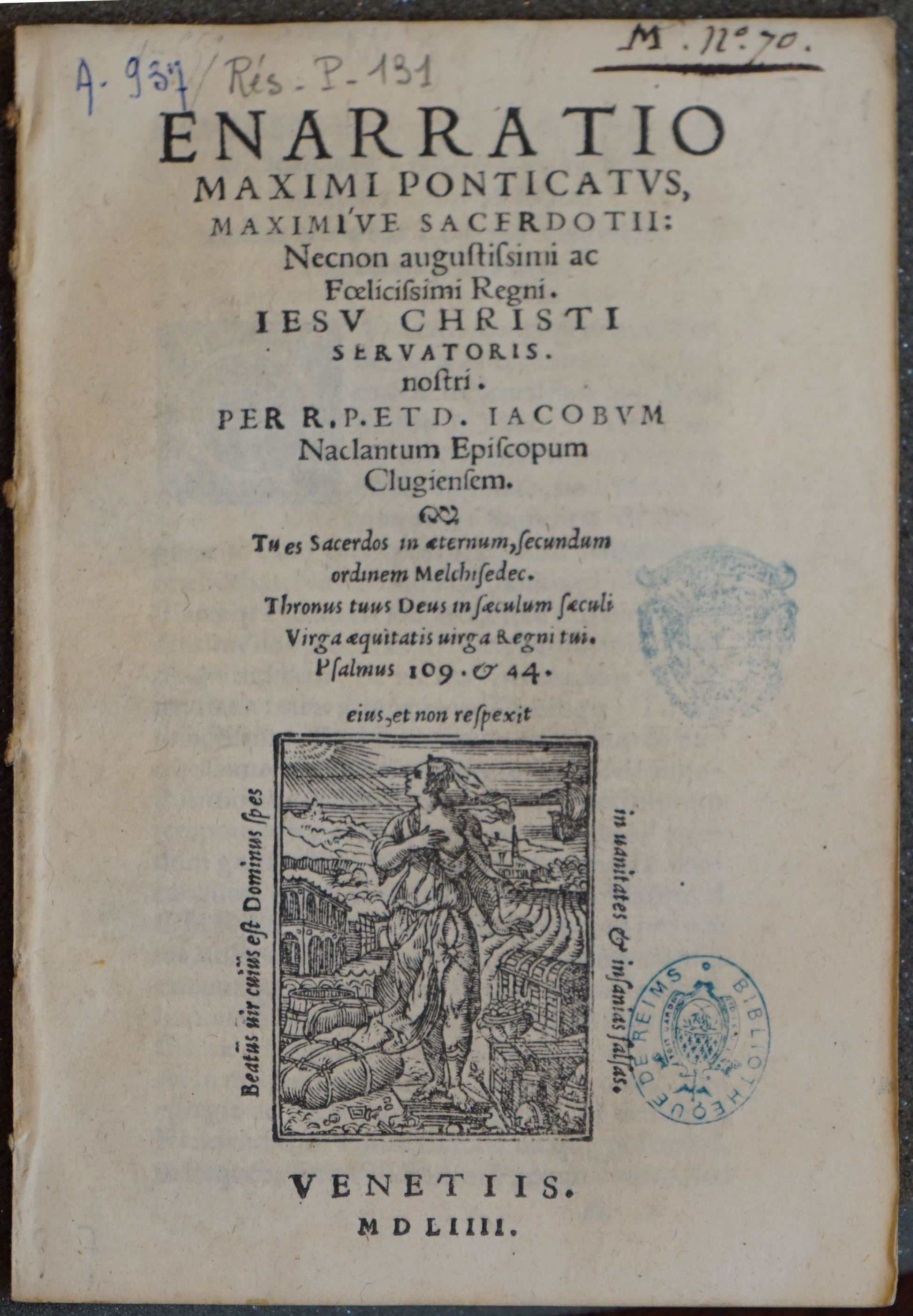
Enaratio maximi ponticatus...

His works were published by Pietro Fratino in Venice in 1567. Among them are:

- Enarrationes ... in ep. D. Pauli ad Ephesios
- In ep. ad Romanos
- S. Scripturæ medulla
- Tractationes XVIII theologales
- Theoremata metaphysica
- Theoremata theologica

== External links and additional sources ==
- Helmut Feld (1993). "Nacchianti, Jacopo (lat. Jacobus Naclantus)". In Bautz, Traugott (ed.). Biographisch-Bibliographisches Kirchenlexikon (BBKL) (in German). Vol. 6. Herzberg: Bautz. cols. 426–428. ISBN 3-88309-044-1.
- Cheney, David M. "Diocese of Chioggia". Catholic-Hierarchy.org. (for Chronology of Bishops) ^{[self-published]}
- Chow, Gabriel. "Diocese of Chioggia (Italy)". GCatholic.org. (for Chronology of Bishops) ^{[self-published]}

Catholic Church titles
Preceded by Alberto Pascaleo	Bishop of Chioggia; 1544-1569	Succeeded by Francesco Pisani (bishop)
