= The Earthly Trinity with Saints and God the Father =

Painting by Jusepe de Ribera

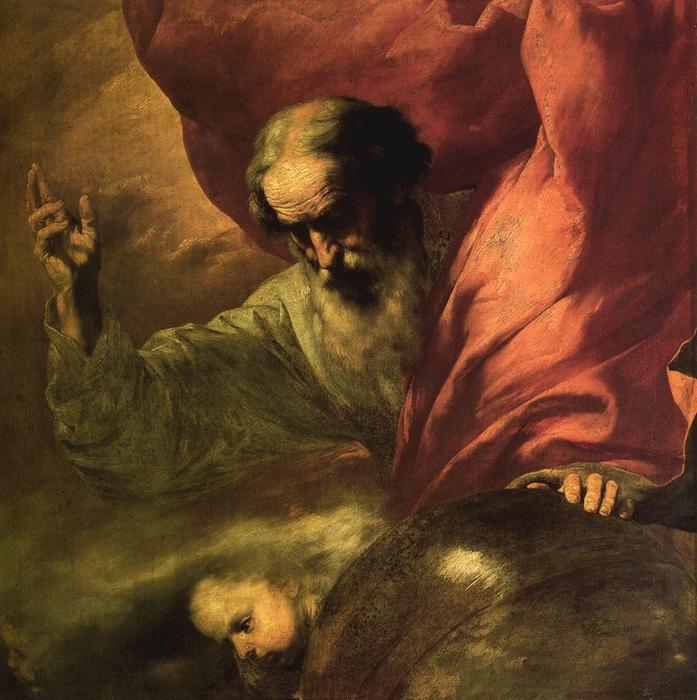

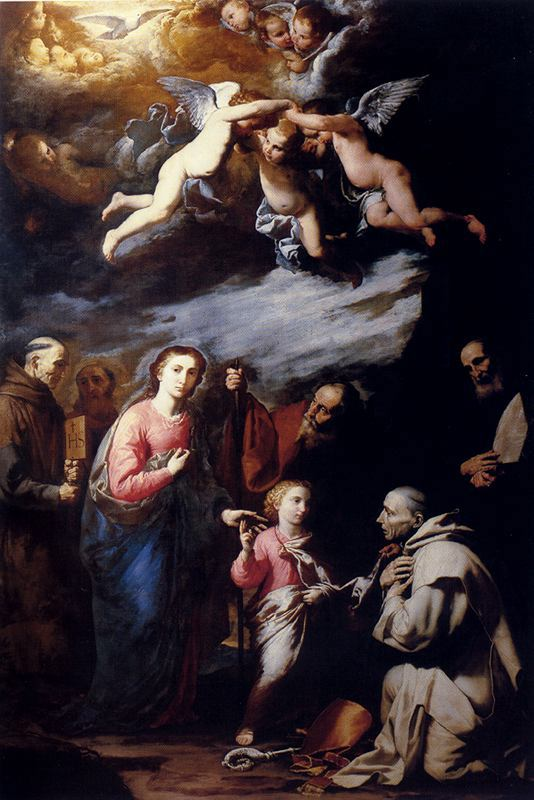

The Earthly Trinity with Saints and God the Father are a pair of c.1626-c.1635 oil on canvas paintings by Jusepe de Ribera, both now in the Museo nazionale di Capodimonte in Naples. Along with the Holy Family, the main work shows Bruno of Cologne, Benedict of Nursia, Bernardino of Siena and Bonaventure.

== History ==
They both originally stood on the marble altar in the transept of Santissima Trinità delle Monache in Naples designed by Cosimo Fanzago and completed in 1628. Ribera had already produced Saint Jerome and the Angel of Judgement for Fanzago for the other side of the transept in 1626.

== Bibliography ==
- (in Italian) Museo di Capodimonte, Milano, Touring Club Italiano, 2012, ISBN 978-88-365-2577-5.
- (in Italian) Nicola Spinosa, Ribera. L'opera completa, Napoli, Electa, 2003.
