= Averoldi =

Averoldi is an Italian surname. Notable people with the surname include:

- Altobello de Averoldi (died 1531), Roman Catholic prelate who served as Bishop of Pula
- Bartolomeo Averoldi, Bishop of Rethymo (d. 1537)
- Bartolomeo Averoldi, Archbishop of Split (c. 1430 – c. 1503)
