= Antonio Grassi (bishop) =

18th-century Italian Catholic bishop

Most Reverend Antonio Grassi
- Bishop of Chioggia
- Church: Catholic Church
- Diocese: Diocese of Chioggia
- In office: 1696–1715
- Predecessor: Stefano Rosato
- Successor: Giovanni Soffietti

Orders
- Ordination: 4 June 1667
- Consecration: 3 June 1696 by Bandino Panciatici

Personal details
- Born: 11 July 1644 Chioggia, Italy
- Died: 4 November 1715 (age 71) Chioggia, Italy

Antonio Grassi (1644–1715) was a Roman Catholic prelate who served as Bishop of Chioggia (1696–1715).

== Biography ==
Antonio Grassi was born in Chioggia, Italy on 11 July 1644. On 18 December 1666, he was ordained a deacon and on 4 June 1667, he was ordained a priest. On 21 May 1696, he was appointed during the papacy of Pope Innocent XII as Bishop of Chioggia. On 3 June 1696, he was consecrated bishop by Bandino Panciatici, Cardinal-Priest of San Pancrazio, with Prospero Bottini, Titular Archbishop of Myra, and Sperello Sperelli, Bishop of Terni, serving as co-consecrators. He served as Bishop of Chioggia until his death on 4 November 1715. While bishop, he ordained Gian Alberto De' Grandi to the priesthood.

== External links and additional sources ==
- Cheney, David M. "Diocese of Chioggia". Catholic-Hierarchy.org. (for Chronology of Bishops) ^{[self-published]}
- Chow, Gabriel. "Diocese of Chioggia (Italy)". GCatholic.org. (for Chronology of Bishops) ^{[self-published]}

Catholic Church titles
Preceded by Stefano Rosato	Bishop of Chioggia; 1696–1715	Succeeded by Giovanni Soffietti
