= Christ Washes the Disciples' Feet (Caracciolo) =

1622 painting by Battistello Caracciolo

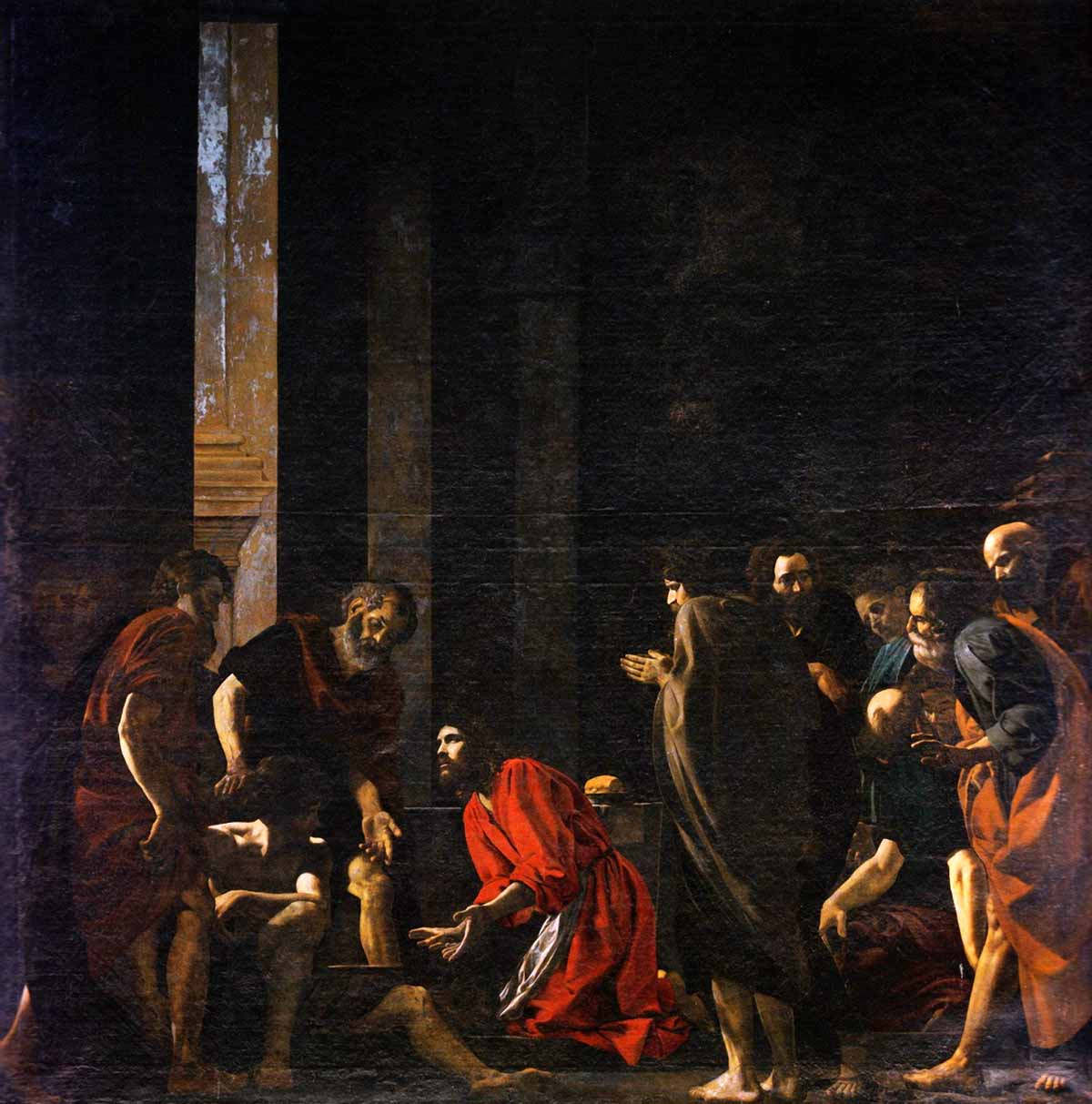

Christ Washes the Disciples' Feet is a 1622 oil on canvas painting by Battistello Caracciolo for the church of the Certosa di San Martino in Naples, where it still hangs. It is held to be one of the artist's masterpieces.

== History ==
Commissioned in April 1622 according to the allocation contract (which survives in Naples' state archives), it was hung on the left wall of the choir of the church that September and later joined on the same wall by Ribera's The Last Supper. It marked Caracciolo's triumphant return to Naples after a long absence, probably involving a visit to Rome, work in Genoa and a stay in Florence.
