= Saint Bruno Receiving the Rule =

1643 oil on canvas painting by Jusepe de Ribera

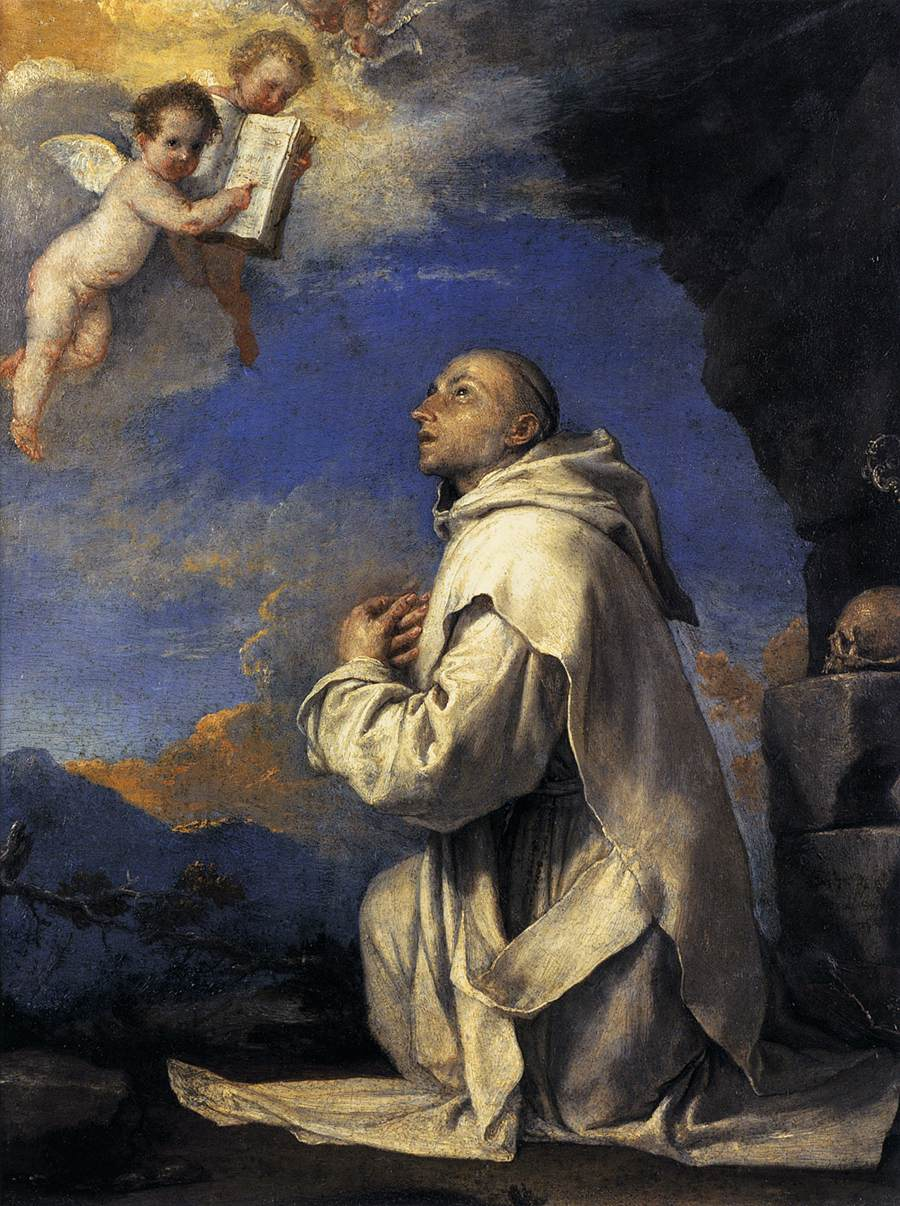

Saint Bruno Receiving the Rule is a 1643 oil on canvas painting by Jusepe de Ribera. It, Saint Sebastian and Saint Jerome were commissioned for the private quarters of the prior of Certosa di San Martino for 100 ducats each. The Certosa also commissioned works from him for its choir and nave (Prophets and Patriarchs). The Certosa was a Carthusian monastery and so the work shows the order's founder Bruno of Cologne, harking back to a composition already used by Ribera of the Madonna and Child with that saint as seen in a work now in Berlin and Earthly Trinity with God the Father.
