= Angelo Daniel =

Italian Roman Catholic bishop (born 1933)

The Most Reverend Angelo Daniel
- Bishop Emeritus of Chioggia
- Church: Catholic Church
- Diocese: Chioggia
- Appointed: 27 November 1997
- Installed: 6 January 1998
- Term ended: 10 January 2009
- Predecessor: Alfredo Magarotto
- Successor: Adriano Tessarollo

Orders
- Ordination: 24 June 1956
- Consecration: 13 December 1997 by Paolo Magnani

Personal details
- Born: 12 October 1933 (age 92) Montebelluna, Kingdom of Italy
- Motto: Gloria et pax
- Coat of arms

Angelo Daniel (born 12 October 1933) is an Italian Roman Catholic prelate who served as bishop of the Diocese of Chioggia from 1998 to 2009. He became bishop emeritus of Chioggia following his resignation from the pastoral government of the diocese in January 2009. He had previously served as vicar general of the Diocese of Treviso.

== Early life and priesthood ==
Daniel was born in Montebelluna, in the Province of Treviso and the Diocese of Treviso, on 12 October 1933. A biographical notice published by the Holy See in connection with his appointment as bishop in 1997 gives his birth date as 11 October 1933. The Diocese of Treviso gives the date as 12 October 1933.

He entered the diocesan seminary of Treviso in 1945 and completed his ecclesiastical studies there. He was ordained a priest for the Diocese of Treviso on 24 June 1956. After his ordination, he served at the diocesan seminary as a teacher and subsequently as vice-rector and pro-rector. He was also involved in vocational ministry.

In 1974 Daniel became archpriest of the parish of Santa Maria Maddalena in Galliera Veneta, a position he held until 1989. In 1989 he was appointed vicar general of the Diocese of Treviso. During his years in Treviso he also held diocesan pastoral responsibilities and participated in the governance of the diocese.

== Episcopate ==
On 27 November 1997, Pope John Paul II appointed Daniel Bishop of Chioggia, succeeding Alfredo Magarotto, who had been appointed Bishop of Vittorio Veneto.

Daniel was consecrated a bishop on 13 December 1997 in the cathedral of Treviso. The principal consecrator was Paolo Magnani, Bishop of Treviso, with Antonio Mistrorigo, Bishop Emeritus of Treviso, and Alfredo Magarotto, Bishop of Vittorio Veneto, as principal co-consecrators. He took canonical possession of the Diocese of Chioggia on 6 January 1998.

During his episcopate, Daniel made pastoral visits to the parishes and promoted the work of the diocesan pastoral and consultative bodies. His episcopate included restoration and development projects involving diocesan buildings and churches.

== Resignation and later life ==
On 10 January 2009, Pope Benedict XVI accepted Daniel's resignation from the pastoral government of the Diocese of Chioggia in accordance with canon 401 §1 of the Code of Canon Law. He has since been known as Bishop Emeritus of Chioggia.

In 2023, the Diocese of Chioggia marked Daniel's 90th birthday on 12 October. A report published shortly before his birthday described celebrations for the bishop and his life of service to the diocese.
