= Raphael Riva =

Italian Roman Catholic prelate

Most Reverend Raphael Riva
- Church: Catholic Church
- Diocese: Diocese of Chioggia
- In office: 1610–1611
- Predecessor: Lorenzo Prezzato
- Successor: Angelo Baroni
- Previous post: Bishop of Korčula (1605–1610)

Personal details
- Died: 1611 Chioggia, Italy

Raphael Riva or Raphael Ripa (died 1611) was a Roman Catholic prelate who served as Bishop of Chioggia (1610–1611) and Bishop of Korčula (1605–1610).

== Biography ==
Raphael Riva was ordained a priest in the Order of Preachers. On 12 September 1605, he was appointed during the papacy of Pope Paul V as Bishop of Korčula. On 24 November 1610, he was appointed during the papacy of Pope Paul V as Bishop of Chioggia. He served as Bishop of Chioggia until his death in 1611.

== External links and additional sources ==
- Cheney, David M. "Diocese of Korčula (Curzola, Cursola)". Catholic-Hierarchy.org. (for Chronology of Bishops) ^{[self-published]}
- Chow, Gabriel. "Titular Episcopal See of Korčula (Croatia)". GCatholic.org. (for Chronology of Bishops) ^{[self-published]}
- Cheney, David M. "Diocese of Chioggia". Catholic-Hierarchy.org. (for Chronology of Bishops) ^{[self-published]}
- Chow, Gabriel. "Diocese of Chioggia (Italy)". GCatholic.org. (for Chronology of Bishops) ^{[self-published]}

Catholic Church titles
Preceded by Agostino Quinzio	Bishop of Korčula; 1605–1610	Succeeded by Theodorus Dedo
Preceded by Lorenzo Prezzato	Bishop of Chioggia; 1610–1611	Succeeded by Angelo Baroni
