= Saint Sebastian (Ribera, Madrid) =

1636 oil on canvas painting by Jusepe de Ribera

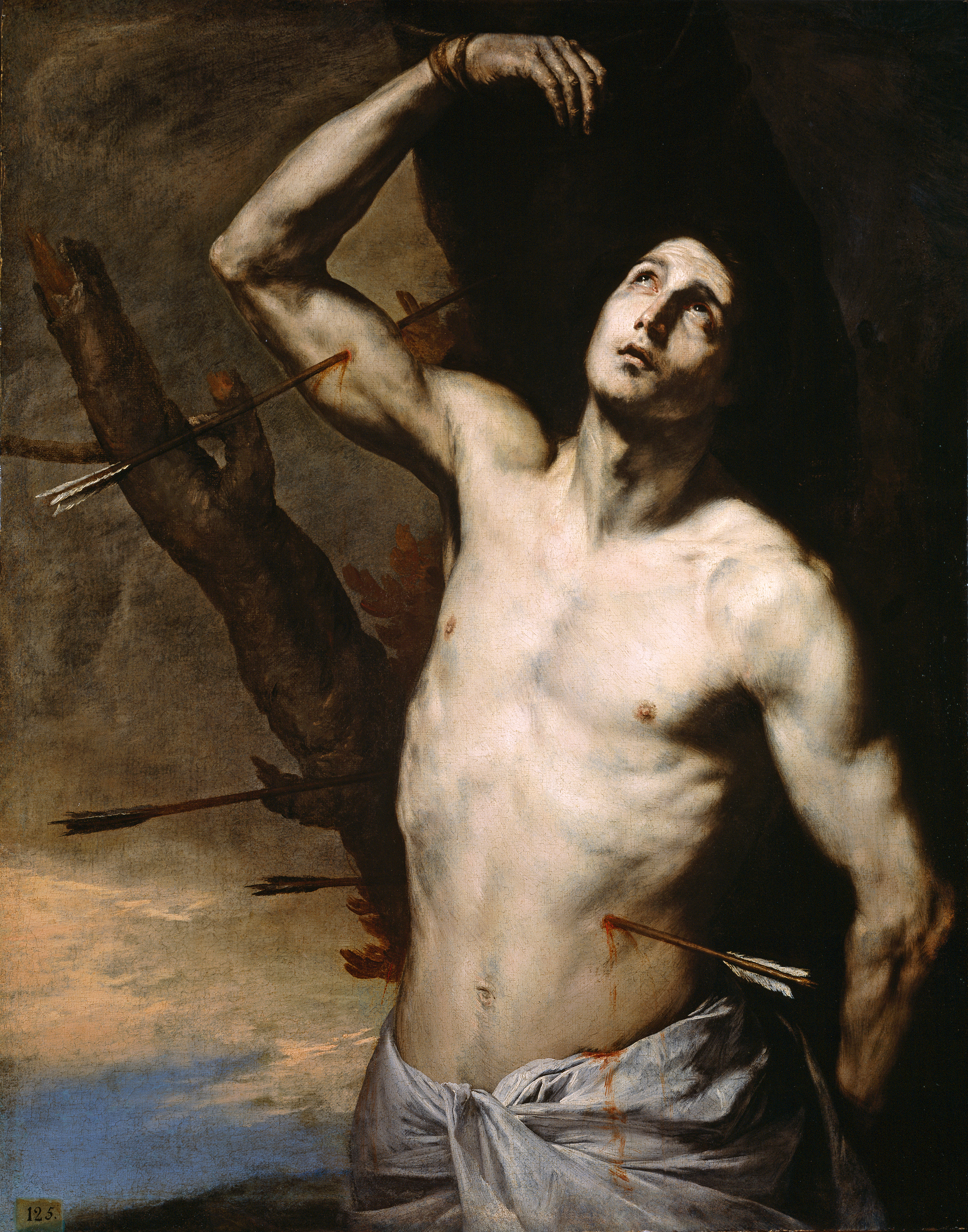

Saint Sebastian is a 1636 oil on canvas painting by Jusepe de Ribera. Its composition was later reprised for a work now in Naples. It was first recorded in the Spanish royal collection in 1747 and it is now in the Museo del Prado in Madrid.
