= Diocese of Korčula =

Roman Catholic diocese in Croatia (1300 - 1828)

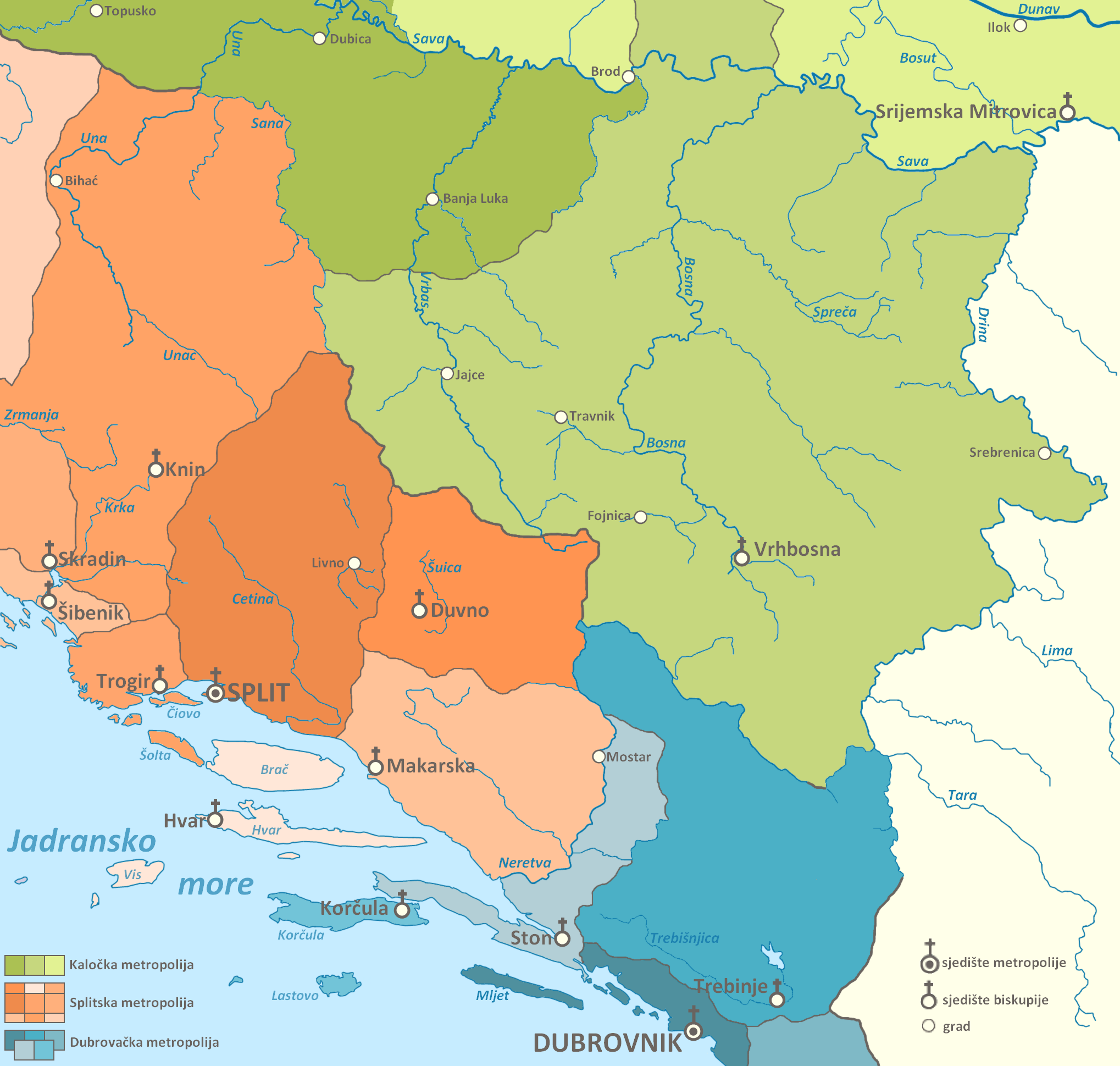
Catholic Dioceses in Bosnia and Dalmatia in the 15th century

The Diocese of Korčula (also Diocese of Curzola or Diocese of Cursola) was a Roman Catholic diocese in Croatia, located in the city of Korčula. In 1828, it was suppressed to the Archdiocese of Dubrovnik.

== History ==
- 1300: Established (from the Diocese of Hvar and from the suppressed Diocese of Ston as Diocese of Korčula (Dioecesis Curzolensis)
- 1541: Lost territory to establish Diocese of Ston
- June 30, 1828: Suppressed to the Diocese of Dubrovnik via the papal bull, Locum Beati Petri, issued by Pope Leo XII on 30 June 1828.
- 1933: Restored as Titular Episcopal See of Korčula

== Ordinaries ==
=== Diocese of Korčula ===
- Dominic Thopia, O.P. (1350–1368) Appointed, Archbishop of Zadar)
- Agostino Quinzio, O.P. (17 Jun 1573 – 17 Aug 1605 Appointed, Bishop of Massa Lubrense)
- Raphael Riva (Ripa), O.P. (12 Sep 1605 – 24 Nov 1610 Appointed, Bishop of Chioggia)
- Theodorus Dedo, O.P. (14 Mar 1611 – Aug 1625 Died)
- Giacomo Fagagna (Faganeo), O.S.H. (28 Jan 1626 – Aug 1642 Died)
- Francesco Manola (12 Jan 1643 – Aug 1664 Died)
- Gerolamo de Andreis (13 Apr 1665 – 2 Feb 1673 Died)
- Nikola Spanic (17 Jul 1673 – 29 Nov 1707 Died)
- Marino Drago (3 Oct 1708 – 9 Oct 1733 Died)
- Vincent Cossovich (1 Dec 1734 – 21 Jul 1761 Died)
- Michael Triali (23 Nov 1761 – 23 Sep 1771 Appointed, Archbishop of Zadar)
- Giovanni Carsana (23 Sep 1771 – 6 Jun 1774 Appointed, Archbishop of Zadar)
- Simon Spalatin (13 Mar 1775 – 25 Jun 1781 Appointed, Bishop of Ossero)
- Antun Belglava (17 Sep 1781 – 28 Sep 1787 Appointed, Bishop of Trogir)
- Josephus Cosserich Teodosio (28 Sep 1787 – Feb 1802 Died)

== See also ==
- Catholic Church in Croatia
