= Nicolas de Crucibus =

Italian Roman Catholic prelate

Most Reverend Nicolas de Crucibus
- Church: Catholic Church
- Diocese: Diocese of Hvar
- In office: 1463–1473
- Predecessor: Thomas de Venezia
- Previous post: Bishop of Chioggia (1457–1463)

Personal details
- Died: 1473 Hvar, Croatia

Nicolas de Crucibus or Nicolò delle Croci (died 1473) was a Roman Catholic prelate who served as Bishop of Hvar (1463–1473) and Bishop of Chioggia (1457–1463).

== Biography ==
On 21 October 1457, Nicolas de Crucibus was appointed Bishop of Chioggia by Pope Callixtus III. On 10 February 1463, he was appointed Bishop of Hvar in Dalmatia Pope Pius II. He served as Bishop of Hvar until his death in 1473.

While bishop, he was the principal co-consecrator of Francesco Barozzi (bishop), Bishop of Treviso (1466).

Catholic Church titles
Preceded by	Bishop of Chioggia; 1457–1463	Succeeded by Nicolas Inversi
Preceded by Thomas of Hvar	Bishop of Hvar; 1463–1473	Succeeded by
