= Thomas of Hvar =

Tommaso Tommasini (Croatian: Toma Tomasini; died in early 1463), better known as Thomas of Hvar (Croatian: Toma Hvarski), was Bishop of Lesina (Hvar) from 23 December 1429 until his death, as well as permanent papal legate to the Kingdom of Bosnia from 1439 until 1461.

Thomas was Venetian by birth, but he "must have known Slavic" both through his episcopate on the Croat-inhabited island and through his prolonged contact with Bosnians. He significantly influenced the relations between the Holy See and Bosnia, as well as papal views on the indigenous Bosnian Church. Still, little is known about his personality, politics, activity in the kingdom or relations with Bosnian Franciscans. John Van Antwerp Fine, Jr. argues that Thomas deliberately misinformed the Papacy about the Bosnian Church, fabricating claims of dualism.

Bishop Thomas of Hvar probably approached his namesake, King Thomas of Bosnia, in 1443, when Pope Eugene IV hoped to draw Bosnia into the Crusade of Varna. He probably discussed the Catholic Church's issue with heresy in Bosnia at that time. In 1446, he converted the King himself from Bosnian Christianity to Catholicism.

== Bibliography ==
- Fine, John Van Antwerp Jr. (2007). The Bosnian Church: Its Place in State and Society from the Thirteenth to the Fifteenth Century. Saqi. ISBN 978-0-86356-503-8.

Catholic Church titles
Preceded by Giorgio	Bishop of Lesina; 1429–1463	Succeeded by Nicolas de Crucibus
