= Michele Di Tolve =

Italian Roman Catholic bishop (born 1963)

The Most Reverend Michele Di Tolve
- Bishop of Chioggia
- Church: Catholic Church
- Archdiocese: Venice
- Diocese: Chioggia
- Appointed: 16 September 2026
- Predecessor: Giampaolo Dianin
- Previous posts: Auxiliary Bishop of Rome; Titular Bishop of Horrea (2023–2026)

Orders
- Ordination: 10 June 1989 by Carlo Maria Martini
- Consecration: 2 September 2023 by Mario Delpini

Personal details
- Born: 19 May 1963 (age 63) Milan, Italy
- Motto: Perché andiate e portiate frutto
- Coat of arms: Michele Di Tolve's coat of arms

Michele Di Tolve (born 19 May 1963) is an Italian Roman Catholic prelate who has served as Bishop of Chioggia since September 2026. He previously served as an auxiliary bishop of the Diocese of Rome and as titular bishop of Horrea from 2023 to 2026. He was also rector of the Pontifical Roman Major Seminary from 2023 to 2026.

== Early life and education ==
Di Tolve was born in Milan, Italy, on 19 May 1963. He made his preparation for the priesthood at the minor seminary of Milan and Archiepiscopal seminary of Milan, studying philosophy and theology. He was ordained a deacon on 4 December 1988 and a priest of the Archdiocese of Milan on 10 June 1989 by Cardinal Carlo Maria Martini in Milan Cathedral.

== Priestly ministry ==
After his priestly ordination, Di Tolve served as parochial vicar of the parish of Santi Martiri Gervaso e Protaso in Novate Milanese from 1989 to 1996. From 1996 to 2007 he was parochial vicar of Santa Maria Ausiliatrice in Cassina de' Pecchi and was responsible for youth ministry at Sant'Agata V.M. in Sant'Agata Martesana.

From 2007 to 2014, he was responsible for the Archdiocese of Milan's Service for the Teaching of Catholic Religion and its Service for School Pastoral Ministry. From 2008 to 2014 he was also a delegate of the supreme moderator of the Istituto Superiore di Scienze Religiose di Milano.

On 1 September 2014, Di Tolve became rector of the Archiepiscopal seminary of Milan and rector of its four-year theological programme. He was named an honorary major canon of the Milan Cathedral metropolitan chapter in 2015. From September 2020 he served as parish priest of San Giovanni Battista in Rho and Sant'Ambrogio ad Nemus in Passirana di Rho.

== Episcopate ==
On 26 May 2023, Pope Francis appointed Di Tolve auxiliary bishop of Rome and titular bishop of Horrea. He received episcopal consecration on 2 September 2023 at Milan Cathedral, with Archbishop Mario Delpini as principal consecrator and Cardinal Angelo De Donatis and Bishop Giovanni Luca Raimondi as principal co-consecrators.

As auxiliary bishop of Rome, Di Tolve was episcopal vicar and coordinator for the care of deacons, clergy, consecrated life and the ordo virginum. He also served as interim director of the diocesan Office for the Clergy.

=== Rector of the Pontifical Roman Major Seminary ===
On 4 July 2023, Di Tolve was appointed rector of the Pontifical Roman Major Seminary by Pope Francis. He remained rector until his appointment to the Diocese of Chioggia in September 2026.

Within the Lazio Episcopal Conference, he served as bishop delegate for education, schools and universities.

== Bishop of Chioggia ==
On 16 September 2026, Pope Leo XIV appointed Di Tolve Bishop of Chioggia, succeeding Giampaolo Dianin. At the time of his appointment he was auxiliary bishop of Rome and titular bishop of Horrea. He was installed on 31 October 2026.

== See also ==
Pontifical Roman Major Seminary

== Episcopal succession ==
Catholic Church titles
Preceded by Giampaolo Dianin	Bishop of Chioggia; 2026–present	Incumbent
