= Nicolas Inversi =

Italian Catholic prelate

Most Reverend Nicolas Inversi
- Church: Catholic Church
- Diocese: Diocese of Chioggia
- In office: 1463–1471
- Predecessor: Nicolas de Crucibus
- Successor: Silvestro Daziari

Orders
- Consecration: 15 May 1463 by Andrea Bondimerio

Personal details
- Died: 1471 Chioggia, Italy

Nicolas Inversi, O.S.M. of Nicolò degl'Inversi (died 1471) was a Catholic prelate who served as Bishop of Chioggia (1463–1471).

== Biography ==
Nicolas Inversi was ordained a priest in the Order of Friar Servants of Mary. On 8 February 1463, he was appointed during the papacy of Pope Pius II as Bishop of Chioggia. On 15 May 1463, he was consecrated bishop by Andrea Bondimerio, Patriarch of Venice. He served as Bishop of Chioggia until his death in 1471.

== External links and additional sources ==
- Cheney, David M. "Diocese of Chioggia". Catholic-Hierarchy.org. (for Chronology of Bishops) ^{[self-published]}
- Chow, Gabriel. "Diocese of Chioggia (Italy)". GCatholic.org. (for Chronology of Bishops) ^{[self-published]}

Catholic Church titles
Preceded by Nicolas de Crucibus	Bishop of Chioggia; 1463–1471	Succeeded by Silvestro Daziari
