= Bernardino Fenier =

Italian Roman Catholic prelate

Most Reverend Bernardino Fenier
- Church: Catholic Church
- See: Diocese of Chioggia
- In office: 1487–1535
- Predecessor: Silvestro Daziari
- Successor: Giovanni dei Tagliacozzi

Orders
- Consecration: April 1487 by Antonio Ursi

Personal details
- Died: 1535 Chioggia, Italy

Bernardino Fenier (also Bernardino Venerio) (died 1535) was a Roman Catholic prelate who served as Bishop of Chioggia (1487–1535).

== Biography ==
On 24 January 1487, Bernardino Fenier was appointed during the papacy of Innocent VIII as Bishop of Chioggia. In April 1487, he was consecrated bishop by Antonio Ursi, Bishop of Canea. He served as Bishop of Chioggia until his death in 1535.

While bishop, he was the principal co-consecrator of Luigi Contarini, Patriarch of Venice (1508).

== External links and additional sources ==
- Cheney, David M. "Diocese of Chioggia". Catholic-Hierarchy.org. (for Chronology of Bishops) ^{[self-published]}
- Chow, Gabriel. "Diocese of Chioggia (Italy)". GCatholic.org. (for Chronology of Bishops) ^{[self-published]}

Catholic Church titles
Preceded by Silvestro Daziari	Bishop of Chioggia; 1487–1535	Succeeded by Giovanni dei Tagliacozzi
