= Santissima Trinità delle Monache =

Church in Naples, Italy

Coordinates: 40.845523°N 14.245091°E

Santissima Trinità delle Monache is a large former monastery and church in central Naples, Italy; it then served as a military hospital, and now hosts art exhibitions. It is located in the Spanish Quarter of the city.

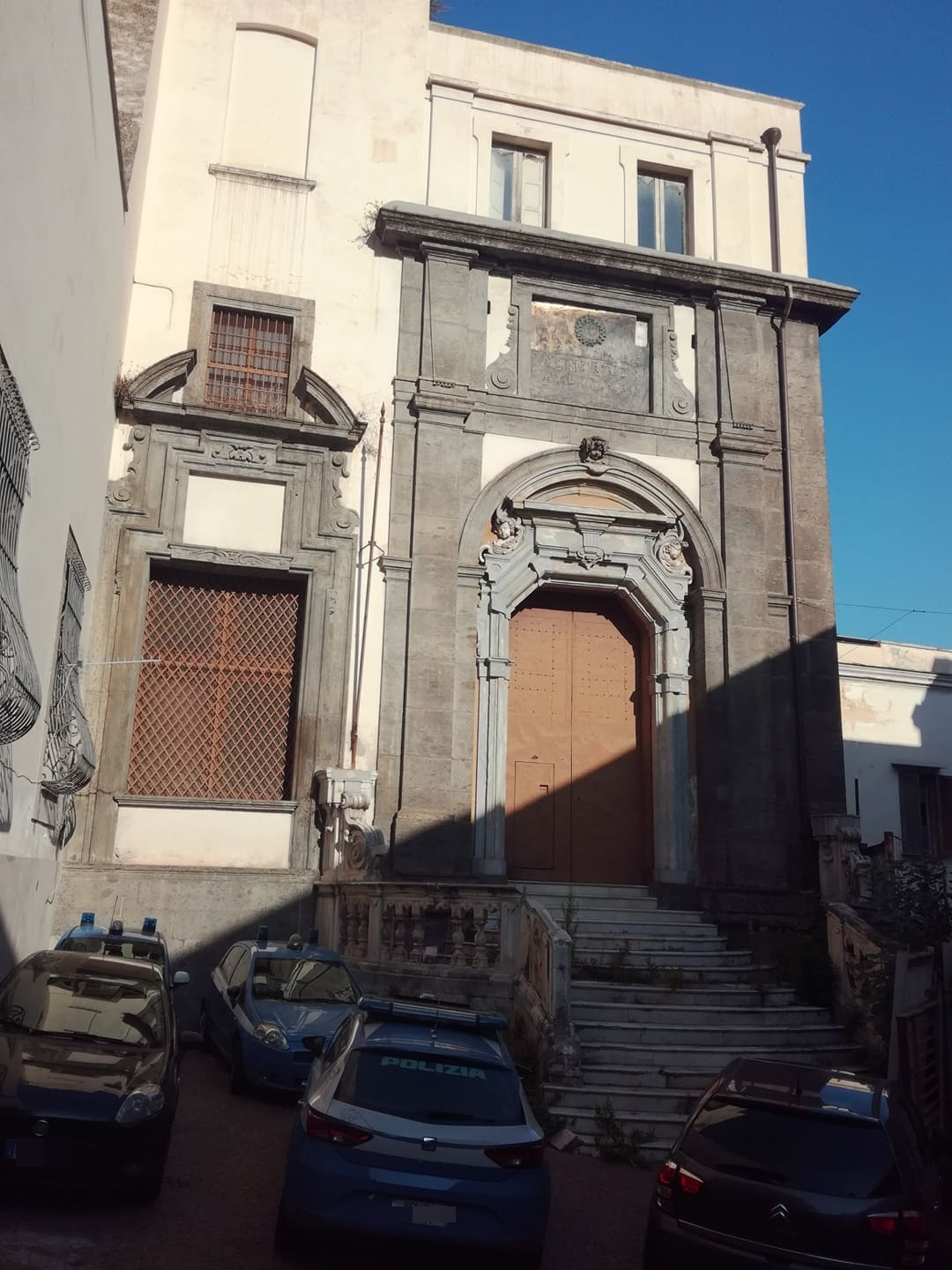
Facade of church

== History ==
The monastery and church was founded in the early 17th century by the noblewoman Vittoria de Silvia. She had refused at the last minute to marry the Count di Biccari, Emilio Caracciolo, and instead retired to a convent, initially choosing the convent of San Girolamo a Mezzocannone, Naples. But wishing to move, she established this convent near the church of Santa Maria Ognibene ai Sette Dolori and the convents attached to Santa Maria della Sapienza and San Giovanni Battista delle Monache.

The construction of the complex began in 1608 involved Francesco Grimaldi, then Giovanni Giacomo De Marino and Giovanni Laurenzio, and in 1615 Giovanni Giacomo Di Conforto supervised the building. By 1620, the church was completed by Francesco Grimaldi.

In 1625 Cosimo Fanzago added the stairs at the entrance of the church, and sculpted some of the marble telamons. The atrium was frescoed by Giovanni Bernardino Azzolino. He helped complete the dome which crumbled during an earthquake in 1897 and was not rebuilt. The church now serves as a pharmacy. The paintings by Giuseppe Ribera for the church (Saint Jerome and the Angel of Judgement and The Earthly Trinity with Saints) were moved to the Capodimonte Museum.
