= Gabriele Fiamma =

Italian Roman Catholic prelate

Most Reverend Gabriele Fiamma
- Bishop of Chioggia
- Portrait by Giovanni Battista Cambio, 1578
- Church: Catholic Church
- Diocese: Diocese of Chioggia
- In office: 1584–1585
- Predecessor: Marco Medici
- Successor: Massimiliano Beniamino

Personal details
- Born: 1533
- Died: 14 July 1585 (age 52)

Gabriele Fiamma or Gabriello Fiamma (1533–1585) was a Roman Catholic prelate who served as Bishop of Chioggia (1584–1585).

== Biography ==
Marco Medici was born in 1533 and ordained a priest in the Canons Regular of Saint Augustine. On 23 January 1584, he was appointed during the papacy of Pope Gregory XIII as Bishop of Chioggia. He served as Bishop of Chioggia until his death on 14 July 1585.

== External links and additional sources ==
- Cheney, David M. "Diocese of Chioggia". Catholic-Hierarchy.org. (for Chronology of Bishops) ^{[self-published]}
- Chow, Gabriel. "Diocese of Chioggia (Italy)". GCatholic.org. (for Chronology of Bishops) ^{[self-published]}

Catholic Church titles
Preceded by Marco Medici	Bishop of Chioggia; 1584–1585	Succeeded by Massimiliano Beniamino
