= Giovanni dei Tagliacozzi =

Italian Roman Catholic prelate

Most Reverend Giovanni dei Tagliacozzi
- Bishop of Chioggia
- Church: Catholic Church
- Diocese: Diocese of Chioggia
- In office: 1535–1540
- Predecessor: Bernardino Fenier
- Successor: Alberto Pascaleo de Utino

Orders
- Consecration: 7 December 1535 by Defendente Valvassori

Personal details
- Died: 5 October 1540

Giovanni dei Tagliacozzi (died 1540) was a Roman Catholic prelate who served as Bishop of Chioggia (1535–1540).

== Biography ==
On 20 October 1535, he was appointed during the papacy of Pope Paul III as Bishop of Chioggia. On 7 December 1535, he was consecrated bishop by Defendente Valvassori, Bishop of Capodistria, with Giacomo de Cadapesario, Bishop of Paphos, and Vincenzo Negusanti, Bishop of Arbe, serving as co-consecrators. He served as Bishop of Chioggia until his death on 5 October 1540.

== External links and additional sources ==
- Cheney, David M. "Diocese of Chioggia". Catholic-Hierarchy.org. (for Chronology of Bishops) ^{[self-published]}
- Chow, Gabriel. "Diocese of Chioggia (Italy)". GCatholic.org. (for Chronology of Bishops) ^{[self-published]}

Catholic Church titles
Preceded by Bernardino Fenier	Bishop of Chioggia; 1535–1540	Succeeded by Alberto Pascaleo de Utino
