= Federico Maria Giovanelli =

Italian bishop and Patriarch of Venice (1776–1800)

- Patriarch of Venice
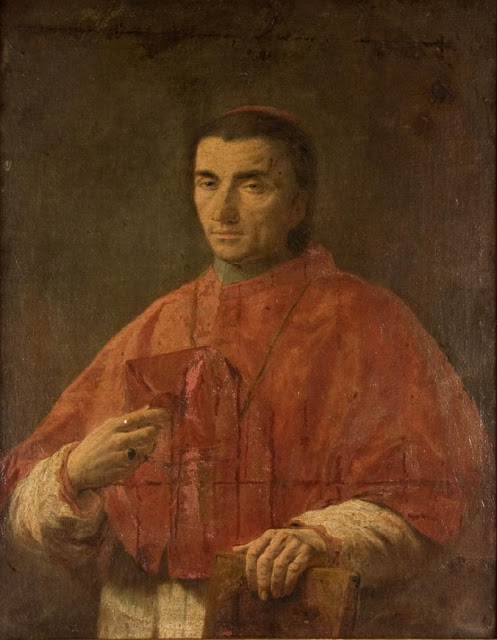
- Church: Catholic Church
- Appointed: 20 May 1776
- Term ended: 10 January 1800
- Predecessor: Giovanni Bragadin
- Successor: Ludovico Flangini Giovanelli
- Other post: bishop of Chioggia

Orders
- Ordination: 21 April 1754 (Priest)
- Consecration: 18 July 1773 (Bishop) by Carlo Rezzonico

Personal details
- Born: 26 December 1726 Venice, Republic of Venice
- Died: 10 January 1800 (aged 73) Venice, Venetian Province
- Buried: San Pietro di Castello, Venice

Federico Maria Giovanelli (also known as Ferigo Giovanelli; 1726 – 1800) was Patriarch of Venice from 1776 to his death.

== Family ==
Federico Maria Giovanelli was born in Venice on 29 December 1726. Third of the children of Giovanni Paolo Giovanelli and Giulia Calbo, he was descended from a patrician family from Gandino, near Bergamo, enriched thanks to the textile trade. In the mid-17th century, the Giovanelli family accumulated wealth facilitated the diversification of family activities economically, with interests in copper mines in Slovakia and Hungary and large estates in Bergamo, Veneto, Trentino and Tyrol, while some of its members pursued careers in the military field at the service of the Emperor in the fights against the Turks, earning noble titles. In the second half of the century one of the family branches settled in Venice and entered the Venetian patriciate in 1668 thanks to a donation of one hundred one thousand ducats to the Republic of Venice to support the Cretan War. Federico's father got rid of commercial activities, which did not add prestige to the noble titles, and acquired new lands. His older brothers, Giovanni Andrea and Giovanni Benedetto, educated in Bavaria, held various government positions at the service of the Venetian Republic.

== Life ==
Destined for the Church, Federico Maria was educated in Rome at the Jesuit college and in Brescia. In 1758, upon accession to the papacy, Pope Clement XIII, a Venetian like himself, called him to Rome as his domestic prelate and secret waiter. After Clement XIII died, he returned to Venice where the Senate elected him bishop of Chioggia on 15 April 1773, appointment confirmed by the Pope on 12 July 1773, after he had obtained on 24 May 1773 a doctorate in utroque iure at the University of Padua. The next 18 July he was consecrated bishop in Rome by Cardinal Carlo Rezzonico.

In January 1776, upon the death of Patriarch Giovanni Bragadin, aided by family wealth and the good reputation of his government of the diocese of Chioggia, the Venetian Senate elected him Patriarch of Venice and Primate of Dalmatia, confirmed by Pope Pius VI on next 20 May.

During his patriarchate Giovanelli witnessed the fall of the Republic of Venice in May 1797, occupied by Napoleonic troops. Called to swear allegiance to the new regime, he came accompanied by the clergy and, almost blind, had the parish priest of San Bartolomeo read a diplomatic declaration inviting the people to abide by the new laws while respecting religion. After the Treaty of Campo Formio, by which Venice was dependent on Austrian monarchy, the Emperor Francis II appointed Federico Maria a secret advisor and Pope Pius VI, on the way to his captivity in France, an apostolic delegate.

Federico Maria Giovanelli died in Venice on 10 January 1800 to apoplexy during the 1799–1800 papal conclave which had been convened in Venice. His funeral was held on 19 February in the church of San Francesco della Vigna, his state funeral was held in St Mark's Basilica on 13 March, and he was buried in the cathedral of San Pietro di Castello in Venice.
