= Nicola Tagliacozzi Canale =

Nicola Tagliacozzi Canale (Naples, 1691 – Naples, 1764) was an Italian architect, engineer, engraver, and scenic designer of the Rococo period in Naples, Kingdom of Naples. He was influenced by his contemporaries Domenico Antonio Vaccaro and Ferdinando Sanfelice. He contributed to original designs or reconstructions at Santissima Trinità delle Monache, San Martino, San Gregorio Armeno, Santa Maria di Costantinopoli, a chapel of the Cathedral of Barletta, and Palazzo Trabucco. he also helped design the Basilica Minore Santa Maria Assunta e Santo Stefano Vescovo of Caiazzo.
