= Bartolomeo Averoldi, Archbishop of Split =

Bartolomeo Averoldi (Croatian: Bartolomej Averoldi; c. 1430 – c. 1503) was a prelate of the Catholic Church who served as the Archbishop of Split from 1479 to 1503.

Prior to his episcopacy, Averoldi was a Benedictine abbot in Brescia and as such was one of the candidates for the bishop of Brescia. During his entire tenure as the archbishop of Split, Averoldi negotiated with the Holy See to be translated to Brescia. He spent most of his episcopate outside of Split. The commune of Split sued him for usurpation since he lived in Venice spending the archdiocesan funds. In 1496, the commune sent his vicar general Jerolim Cipik with several of the diocesan canons who were dissatisfied with the lack of books and items necessary for the liturgy to Venice. The government of the Republic of Venice issued an order to Averoldi to buy what is necessary with the archdiocesan funds, but Averoldi was deaf to the order until 1498. That year, the Venetian government sent the order to the Duke of Split Marin Mauro to elect the suffragan bishop as Averoldi's replacement and buy necessary liturgical items, all of which would be funded from Averoldi's payment.
