= Saint Jerome and the Angel of Judgement =

Painting by Jusepe de Ribera

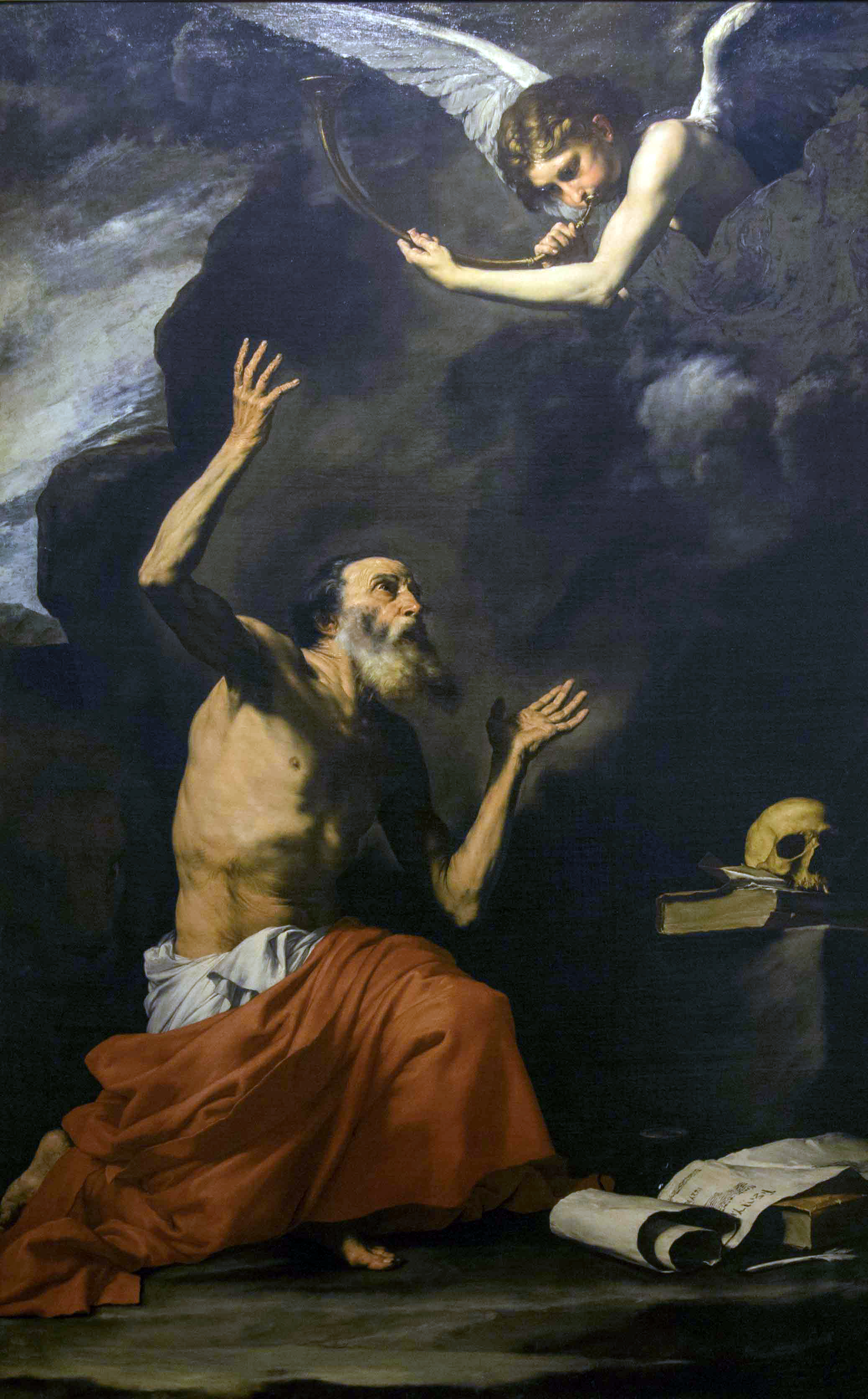
- Artist: Jusepe de Ribera
- Year: 1626; 400 years ago
- Medium: oil on canvas
- Dimensions: 262 cm × 164 cm (103 in × 65 in)
- Location: National Museum of Capodimonte, Naples

Saint Jerome and the Angel of Judgement is an oil on canvas painting by Jusepe de Ribera, signed and dated by the artist in 1626. It was produced as a display for a side chapel next to the high altar of the church of Santissima Trinità delle Monache, which also housed Ribera's Earthly Trinity. After the religious order running the building was suppressed in 1813, the canvas entered the Bourbon Collection and the National Museum of Capodimonte in Naples, where it still hangs today.

The painting is typical of Neapolitan Caravaggism. The figure of an angel blowing a trumpet draws on the angel in Caravaggio's own Saint Matthew and the Angel. The work shows Saint Jerome producing the Vulgate Bible, shown as a scroll on the floor in front of him. Behind Jerome is his typical attribute of a lion, whilst to his right are a skull and a book, both also attributes of the saint.
