= Saint Sebastian (Ribera, Naples) =

1651 oil on canvas painting by Jusepe de Ribera

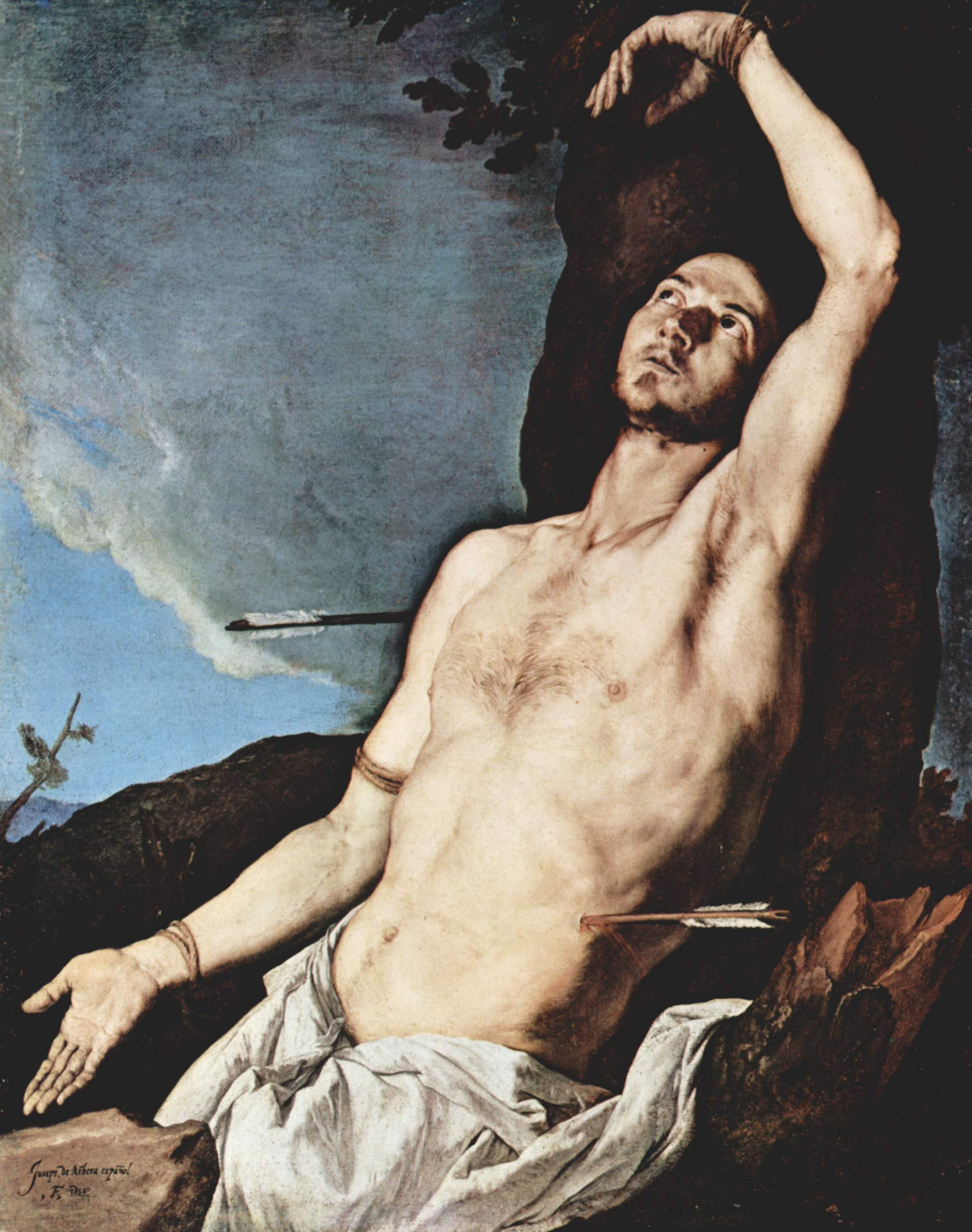

Saint Sebastian is a 1651 oil on canvas painting by Jusepe de Ribera. With Saint Bruno Receiving the Rule and Saint Jerome, it is one of three works commissioned from him for the private quarters of the prior of the Certosa di San Martino in Naples, where they still hang. A work of his second maturity, it is a second version of a 1636 work now in Madrid.
