= Bartolomeo Averoldi, Bishop of Rethymo =

Most Reverend Bartolomeo Averoldi
- Bishop of Rethymo
- Church: Catholic Church
- Diocese: Diocese of Rethymo
- In office: 1517–1537
- Predecessor: Antonii Zili
- Successor: Alberto Pascaleo de Utino

Personal details
- Died: 1537

Bartolomeo Averoldi (died 1537) was a Roman Catholic prelate who served as Bishop of Rethymo (1517–1537).

== Biography ==
On 18 September 1517, Bartolomeo Averoldi was appointed during the papacy of Pope Leo X as Bishop of Rethymo. He served as Bishop of Rethymo until his death in 1537.

== External links and additional sources ==
- Cheney, David M. "Diocese of Rethymo". Catholic-Hierarchy.org. (for Chronology of Bishops) ^{[self-published]}
- Chow, Gabriel. "Titular Episcopal See of Rhithymna (Greece)". GCatholic.org. (for Chronology of Bishops) ^{[self-published]}

Catholic Church titles
Preceded by Antonii Zili	Bishop of Rethymo; 1517–1537	Succeeded by Alberto Pascaleo de Utino
