= Diocese of Chioggia =

Roman Catholic diocese in Italy

Coordinates: 45.2167°N 12.2833°E

Diocese of Chioggia Dioecesis Clodiensis

Catholic
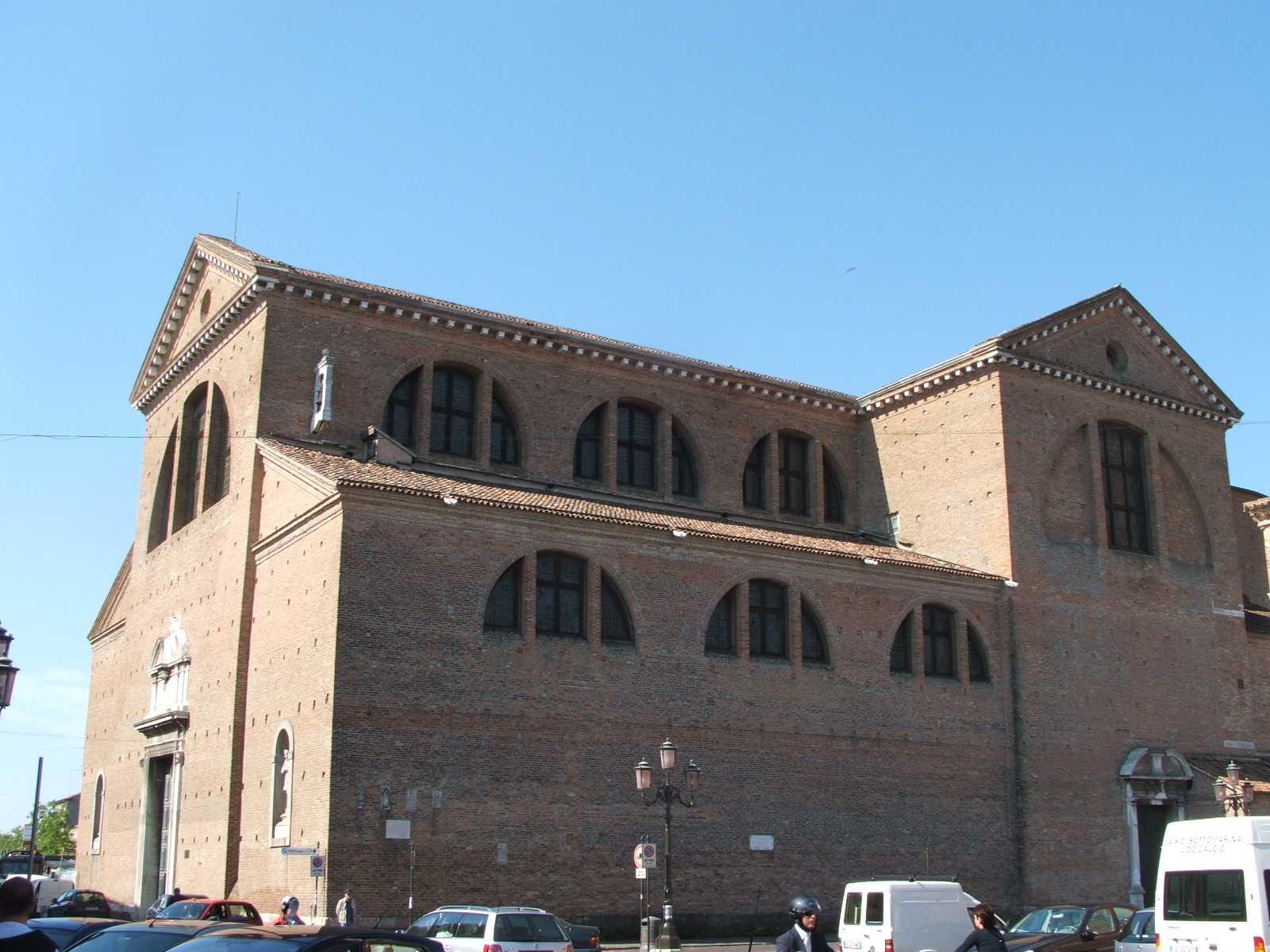
- Chioggia Cathedral

Location
- Country: Italy
- Ecclesiastical province: Venice

Statistics
- Area: 1,000 km^{2} (390 sq mi)
- Population: Total; Catholics: (as of 2023); 116,130 (est.) ▼; 106,290 (est.) ▼
- Parishes: 67 ▼

Information
- Denomination: Catholic Church
- Rite: Roman Rite
- Established: 7th Century
- Cathedral: Cattedrale di S. Maria Assunta
- Secular priests: 53 (diocesan) ▼17 (Religious Orders) ▲5 Permanent Deacons ▼

Current leadership
- Pope: Leo XIV
- Bishop: Michele Di Tolve
- Bishops emeritus: Adriano Tessarollo; Angelo Daniel

Map

Website
- www.diocesidichioggia.it

The Diocese of Chioggia (Latin: Dioecesis Clodiensis) is a Latin diocese of the Catholic Church in the Veneto, at the southernmost point of the Laguna veneta. Until 1451, the diocese was a suffragan of the Patriarchate of Grado. On 8 October 1451, in the bull Regis Aeterni, Pope Nicholas V abolished the patriarchate of Grado, and transferred its powers and privileges to the Patriarchate of Venice. Since then, Chioggia has been a suffragan of Venice.

== History ==
Chioggia in antiquity was known as Fossa Clodia; in the Middle Ages it was called Clugia. In 1110, Enrico Grancarolo, Bishop of Malamocco, then nearly deserted, transferred his see to Chioggia. The bishops continued to use the title Bishops of Malamocco down through Bishop Domenico Guillari (1139).

=== Episcopal election of 1284 ===
The episcopal election of 1284 was so contentious that two candidates were claimed as bishops-elect. Some of the Canons chose Ptolemaeus, Bishop of Sarda in Epirus, and requested his transfer by the pope. Others chose Aliro, the parish priest of S. Giovanni Chrysostomo in Venice. The matter was finally referred to the pope, who appointed Cardinal Comes Glusiani to preside over the litigation. During the litigation, Bishop Tolomeo abandoned his suit and renounced any legal rights he might have had in the matter. Those who had elected him then presumed to proceeded to another election, despite the fact that the election had been referred to the pope; they chose Uberto, the abbot of the monastery de Brondolo. When news of this latest election reached the papal court, Aliro's lawyer appealed against Uberto as well. Cardinal Comes finally ruled that both elections were invalid.

Uberto, however, was not to be put off, and so he entered a postulatio with the Patriarch of Grado, and got himself admitted to the episcopal throne. Aliro's lawyer entered an appeal against Uberto, the Patriarch, and Uberto's electors on the grounds that there were still matters under appeal which had not been ruled on, but the Patriarch went ahead and consecrated Uberto and ordered him installed on the episcopal throne. Pope Urban IV in his narration of the event calls Uberto intrusus.

Never discouraged in their pursuit of power, the Canons who supported Uberto then held another election, and chose Leonardo Faletrum of Venice as bishop of Chioggia. Before that election could proceed to a confirmation by anyone, Aliro's lawyer, Joannes Vandalinus, lodged an appeal to the papal court against Leonardo, his electors, and the Patriarch of Grado. The Patriarch confirmed the election anyway, and granted Leonardo temporal and spiritual possession of the diocese. Leonardo also appealed to the Holy See against Canon Joannes Vandalinus, the former procurator of Aliro. Pope Honorius IV declared Leonardo's possession "presumptuous". In the meantime, Leonardo and his supporters stole all of the property belonging to the benefices of the Canons who had supported Aliro.

The pope then voided the elections and, on 17 June 1286, appointed the bishop of Castello, Bartolomeo Quirini, as Apostolic Administrator of the diocese. He was ordered to see to the restoration of the property of the Canons who had supported Aliro. Finally, both Aliro and Leonardo surrendered to papal jurisdiction, and resigned their rights. It was not until 11 January 1287 that Pope Honorius IV provided (appointed) a new bishop, Stephanus Betani, a parish priest from Venice.

=== Election of 1302 ===
On the death of Bishop Henricus, the cathedral Chapter met to select a new bishop. Some of the Canons voted for Luca, the Vicar of the bishop of Castello; others voted for the priest Giacomo, the chancellor of the Doge of Venice. They were not able to come to an agreement on one candidate, and a cleric of Chioggia, Marco Guandelini, entered an appeal to the Holy See in opposition to the chancellor. The two candidates presented themselves before Pope Boniface VIII and resigned their claims. Boniface then appointed the priest Fra Roberto, O.E.S.A. to the vacant episcopal seat on 24 September 1302. Roberto was consecrated in Rome by Cardinal Leonardo Patrassi, the suburbicarian Bishop of Albano.

=== Election of 1322 ===
Following the death of Bishop Ottonellus, the cathedral Chapter met and elected Andreas of Venice, the parish priest of S. Marina, as their new bishop. When their certificate of election was presented to Pope John XXII he immediately voided the election. The bishop, he said, had died at the papal court (and thereby, by longstanding custom, the pope acquired the right to name his successor), but also the pope had previously reserved to himself the right to appoint the bishops of Chioggia. Then, on 22 August 1322, John XXII provided (appointed) Father Andreas to the bishopric of Chioggia, Apostolicae Sedis gratia. The Chapter of Chioggia had lost its right to elect is bishop.

On 25 January 1348, during the episcopate of Bishop Pietro da Clusello, the lower Po Valley was struck by two very large earthquakes, which were felt as far away as Trent, Piacenza, Modena, and Dalmatia. In Venice, four church towers were thrown down, and the entire façade of the church of S. Basilio was destroyed. Specific damage at Chioggia is not recorded.

In the same year, 1348, the Black Death also struck the Veneto. In the city of Venice seven out of ten inhabitants died, according to a census taken immediately after. At Chioggia, by 1 August 1348, the situation was so bad ("propter pestem mortalitatis multum est de populata") that the Podestà and Great Council ordered that those who had been condemned and were under the ban (banished) were granted grace and remission. Chioggia's most distinguished citizen, Achino degli Orsi Carnelli, who was a Canon of the cathedral of Chioggia and a professor of Canon Law at the University of Padua, died of the plague: Hunc Decreta docentem Padua stravit In medio Madi: fuerat tum maxima pestis.

Other bishops of Chioggia were: Giacomo Nacchiante (1544); the Dominican Marco Medici (1578), a theologian at the Council of Trent; and Gabriello Fiamma (1584), one of the greatest orators of his time.. Bishop Fiamma (1584–1585), with the agreement of the Podestà of Chioggia, permitted the establishment of the first Capuchin house in his diocese, on 15 March 1584.

=== Chapter and cathedral ===
The original cathedral of Chioggia was dedicated to the Nativity of the Virgin Mary. It was also a parish church, and one of the Canons of the cathedral Chapter was designated to oversee the spiritual welfare of the parishioners. The old cathedral at Malamacco, the former episcopal seat, was presided over by an archpriest and an archdeacon.

In 1319, the cathedral Chapter consisted of nineteen Canons, though five of the stalls were vacant at the time. The Canons, with the support of Bishop Ottonellus (1317–1321), proposed to reduce the number of Canons permanently to fourteen, simply by never filling the vacancies. It was expected that this would receive the approval of the Papacy, which was supporting reduction plans in other dioceses. The community of Chioggia, however, made immediate objections, that the proposed reduction also reduced the prestige of their cathedral, and that the reduction made fewer positions available for worthy clergy to rise to the rank of prelate. Criticism and agitation continued to grow until the Podestà of Chioggia, Fantin Dandolo of Venice, summoned a meeting of the Great Council of Chioggia, at which a full airing of the complaints was allowed. The result was the withdrawal of the right of Canons who were Venetian public notaries and chancellors to conduct civil business with and for the people of Chioggia. The Doge and Council of Venice, however, were displeased with the uproar, and in a letter of 24 July 1319 to the new Podestà (by which time Bishop Ottonellus had died and Dandalo's term had ended), ordered that both sides should withdraw their actions. The letter was read to the Council of Chioggia on 1 August 1319, and the Council of Chioggia voted to revoke all of its actions with regard to the Canons.

On 4 November 1347, the tower of the cathedral collapsed. Rebuilding began immediately, though the cornerstone was laid by the Podestà, not by Bishop Pietro, who was in Venice on business.

In 1605, Bishop Lorenzo Prezzato (1601–1610) created the dignity of Archpriest in the Chapter of the cathedral of Chioggia. In 1716, there were three dignities and seventeen Canons.

Cardinal Pietro Bembo was a canon of the cathedral.

=== Diocesan synods ===
A diocesan synod was an irregularly held, but important, meeting of the bishop of a diocese and his clergy. Its purpose was (1) to proclaim generally the various decrees already issued by the bishop; (2) to discuss and ratify measures on which the bishop chose to consult with his clergy; (3) to publish statutes and decrees of the diocesan synod, of the provincial synod, and of the Holy See.

In November 1490, Bishop Bernardino Fenier (1487–1535) presided over a diocesan synod. Bishop Alberto Pascaleo, O.P. (1540–1543) held a diocesan synod on 1 June 1541. Bishop Jacopo Nacchianti, O.P. (1544–1569) held diocesan synods in 1545 and 1564; the latter was a lengthy informational session on the recently concluded Council of Trent and its decrees. Bishop Lorenzo Prezzato (1601–1610) held a diocesan synod on 21–23 October 1603. Bishop Pietro Paolo Miloto (1615–1618) held a diocesan synod in Chioggia on 25–27 October 1616. Another diocesan synod was held by Bishop Pasquale Grassi (1619–1636) on 29–30 June 1634. Bishop Federico de Grassi held two diocesan synods, the first in 1648, and the second in 1662. Bishop Sennen Corrà (1976–1989) held a diocesan synod in 1988, said to have been the 18th in diocesan history.

== Bishops of Chioggia ==
=== Up to 1200 ===
...

- Felix (attested 876)
- Leo (attested 877)

...

- Dominicus (attested 924)

...

- Petrus (attested 960–967)

...

- Leo (c. 1006)

...

- Dominicus (attested 1046)

...

- Henricus (attested 1060)

...

- Stephanus Badovario (attested 1107)
- Henricus Grancariolus (attested 1110)

...

- Stephanus (attested 1122–1127)

...

- Domenico Guillari (attested 1139)

...

- Felix (12th cent.)

...

- Giovanni Faliero (attested 1162)
- Marino Ruibolo (attested 1165)

...

- Araldus Blancus (attested 1182–1192)

...

=== 1200 to 1500 ===
...

- Dominicus (attested 1203)
- Felix (attested 1218–1228)
- Dominicus Silvus (attested 1235–1236)
- Wido (Guido) (1236– )
- Matthaeus (attested 1265–1284)

Wibertus (Uberto) Intrusus
Bartholomaeus Quirini, Bishop of Castello (1286–1287) Apostolic Administrator

- Stephanus Betani (1287– ) Bishop-elect
- Henricus, O.Min. (1290–1302)
- Robertus, O.E.S.A. (1302–1316)
- Ottonellus, O.P. (1317–1321)
- Andreas Dotto (1322–1342)
- Michael da Verona, O.P. (1342–1346)
- Pietro da Clusello, O.P. (1346–1347)
- Benedetto, O.P. (1348–1353)
- Leonardo Cagnoli (1353–1362)
- Angelo Canopeio (1363–1369)
- Giovanni da Camino (1369–1374)
- Nicolaus (1374–1375)
- Nicolaus Foscarini (1376–1387)
- Silvestro (1387–1401)
- Paolo di Giovanni (1401–1410)
- Cristoforo Zeno (1410–1411)
- Petrus Schiena, O.Min. (1411–1414)
- Benedetto Manfredi (1414–1421)
- Pasqualino Centoferri (1421–1457)
- Nicolas de Crucibus (21 Oct 1457 –1463)
- Nicolas Inversi, O.S.M. (8 Feb 1463 – 1471)
- Jacobus de Rubeis (1471–1479?)
- Silvestro Daziari (1480–1487)
- Bernardino Fenier (Venerio) (24 Jan 1487 – 1535)

=== 1500 to 1800 ===
- Giovanni dei Tagliacozzi (20 Oct 1535 – 5 Oct 1540)
- Alberto Pascaleo, O.P. (5 Nov 1540 – Dec 1543)
- Jacopo Nacchianti, O.P. (30 Jan 1544 –1569)
- Francesco Pisani (bishop) (19 Jul 1569 – 8 Feb 1572)
- Girolamo Negri (bishop) (10 Oct 1572 – 1578 Resigned)
- Marco Medici, O.P. (15 Dec 1578 – 30 Aug 1583)
- Gabriele Fiamma, C.R.S.A. (1584–1585)
- Massimiliano Beniamino, O.F.M. Conv. (9 Sep 1585 – 10 Mar 1601)
- Lorenzo Prezzato (4 Jun 1601 – 29 Oct 1610)
- Raphael Riva (Ripa), O.P. (24 Nov 1610 – 1611)
- Angelo Baroni, O.P. (1611–1612)
- Bartolomeo Cartolario (1613–1614)
- Pietro Paolo Miloto (1615–1618)
- Pasquale Grassi (1619–1636)

Sede vacante (1636–1640)

- Francesco Grassi (16 Jan 1640 – 4 Apr 1669)
- Giovanni Antonio Baldi (15 Jul 1669 – 8 Oct 1679)
- Stefano Rosato (3 Jul 1684 – 22 Jan 1696)
- Antonio Grassi (21 May 1696 – 4 Nov 1715)
- Giovanni Soffietti, C.R.M. (5 Feb 1716 –1733)
- Giovanni Maria Benzoni (1733–1744 Resigned)
- Paolo Francesco Giustiniani, O.F.M. Cap. (1744–1750)
- Gian Alberto De' Grandi, C.R.L. (16 Nov 1750 – 21 Jul 1752)
- Vincenzo Dominico Bragadin, O.F.M. Cap. (26 Sep 1753 – 21 Jun 1762)
- Gianagostino Gradenigo, O.S.B. (1762 –1768)
- Giovanni Morosini, O.S.B. (28 May 1770 –1772)
- Federico Maria Giovanelli (12 Jul 1773 –1776)
- Giovanni Benedetto Civran (15 Jul 1776 – 28 Oct 1794)
- Stefano Sceriman, O.P. (1 Jun 1795 – 12 Jun 1806)

=== From 1800 ===
- Giuseppe Maria Peruzzi (18 Sep 1807 – 26 Jun 1818)
- Giuseppe Manfrin Provedi (23 Aug 1819 – 26 Jan 1829)
- Antonio Savorin (15 Mar 1830 – 25 Dec 1840)
- Jacopo De’ Foretti (24 Jan 1842 – 25 Apr 1867)
- Domenico Agostini (27 Oct 1871 – 22 Jun 1877)
- Sigismondo Brandol Rota (25 Jun 1877 – 5 Sep 1877 Resigned)
- Ludovico Marangoni, O.F.M. Conv. (21 Sep 1877 – 21 Nov 1908)
- Antonio Bassani (21 Nov 1908 Succeeded – 1 Oct 1918 Resigned)
- Domenico Mezzadri (2 Jul 1920 – 8 Dec 1936)
- Giacinto Giovanni Ambrosi, O.F.M. Cap. (13 Dec 1937 – 28 Nov 1951)
- Giovanni Battista Piasentini, C.S.Ch. (31 Jan 1952 – 1 May 1976 Retired)
- Sennen Corrà (1 May 1976 – 19 Jul 1989)
- Alfredo Magarotto (22 Feb 1990 – 31 May 1997)
- Angelo Daniel (27 Nov 1997 – 10 Jan 2009 Retired)
- Adriano Tessarollo (28 Mar 2009 – 3 Nov 2021 Retired)
- Giampaolo Dianin (3 Nov 2021 – 14 May 2026)
- Michele Di Tolve (since 16 Sep 2026)

== Books ==
=== General references for bishops ===
- Gams, Pius Bonifatius (1873). Series episcoporum Ecclesiae catholicae: quotquot innotuerunt a beato Petro apostolo (in Latin). Ratisbon: Typis et Sumptibus Georgii Josephi Manz. pp. 785–786.
- Eubel, Conradus, ed. (1913). Hierarchia catholica (in Latin). Vol. Tomus I (second ed.). Münster: Libreria Regensbergiana.
- Eubel, Conradus, ed. (1914). Hierarchia catholica (in Latin). Vol. Tomus II (second ed.). Münster: Libreria Regensbergiana.
- Eubel, Conradus; Gulik, Guilelmus (1923). Hierarchia catholica (in Latin). Vol. Tomus III (second ed.). Münster: Libreria Regensbergiana.
- Gauchat, Patritius (Patrice) (1935). Hierarchia catholica (in Latin). Vol. Tomus IV (1592-1667). Münster: Libraria Regensbergiana.
- Ritzler, Remigius; Sefrin, Pirminus (1952). Hierarchia catholica medii et recentis aevi (in Latin). Vol. Tomus V (1667-1730). Patavii: Messagero di S. Antonio.
- Ritzler, Remigius; Sefrin, Pirminus (1958). Hierarchia catholica medii et recentis aevi. Vol. Tomus VI (1730-1799). Patavii: Messagero di S. Antonio.
- Ritzler, Remigius; Sefrin, Pirminus (1968). Hierarchia Catholica medii et recentioris aevi (in Latin). Vol. VII (1800–1846). Monasterii: Libreria Regensburgiana.
- Remigius Ritzler; Pirminus Sefrin (1978). Hierarchia catholica Medii et recentioris aevi (in Latin). Vol. VIII (1846–1903). Il Messaggero di S. Antonio.
- Pięta, Zenon (2002). Hierarchia catholica medii et recentioris aevi (in Latin). Vol. IX (1903–1922). Padua: Messagero di San Antonio. ISBN 978-88-250-1000-8.

=== Studies ===
- Cappelletti, Giuseppe (1854). Le chiese d'Italia dalla loro origine sino ai nostri giorni (in Italian). Vol. decimo (10). Venezia: G. Antonelli. pp. 327–416.
- De Antoni, Dino; Perini, Sergio (1992). Diocesi di Chioggia. Padua: Giunta regionale del Veneto. ISBN 9788877061003.
- Goy, Richard John (1985). Chioggia and the Villages of the Venetian Lagoon: Studies in Urban History. Cambridge University Press. pp. 168–182. ISBN 978-0-521-30275-3. [Malamocco]
- Kehr, Paul Fridolin (1923). Italia Pontificia Vol. VII:2 Venetiae et Histria, Pars II. Berlin: Weidmann, pp. 114–125. (in Latin).
- Morari, Pietro (1870). Storia di Chioggia: Pubblicata con cenni biografici dell'autore tratti dalle notizie compendiose di alcuni vescovi cittadini di Chioggia del Fortunato Luigi Naccari (in Italian). CHioggia: Brotto.
- Naccari, Fortunato Luigi (1821). "Notizie compendiose d'alcuni vescovi cittadini di Chioggia". Giornale dell'Italiana Letteratura. 54: 214–238. (in Italian)
- Ughelli, Ferdinando (1720). Italia Sacra sive De Episcopis Italiae et insularum adjacentium (in Latin). Vol. Tomus quintus. Venezia: apud Sebastianum Coleti. pp. 1343–1359.
- Vianelli, Girolamo (1790). Nuova serie de'vescovi di Malamocco e di Chioggia: Accresciuta e con documenti in gran parte ora sol pubblicati illustrata (in Italian). Vol. Parte prima. Venezia: Stamperia Baglioni.
- Vianelli, Girolamo (1790). Nuova serie de Vescovi di Malamocco e di Chioggia accresciuta e con documenti in gran parte ora sol pubblicati (in Italian). Vol. Parte seconda. Venezia: Stamperia Baglioni.
- Vianelli, Girolamo (1820). Serie de'vescovi di Malamocco e di Chioggia con alcune memorie intorno le di loro azioni (tratta dalla "Serie de'vescovi di Malamocco e di Chioggia" di Girolamo Vianelli) (in Italian). Venezia: Gius. Molinari.
