= Mirto =

Mirto may refer to:

== People ==
- Alexander Mirto Frangipani, Roman Catholic prelate
- Fabio Mirto Frangipani (died 1587), Roman Catholic prelate
- Mirto Davoine (1933-1999), Uruguayan football player
- Mirto Picchi (1915-1980), Italian dramatic tenor
- Ottavio Mirto Frangipani Frangipani (1544-1612), Italian bishop
- Peter G. Mirto (1915-2001), American politician

== Places ==
- Mirto, Sicily, village in the province of Messina, Italy

== Other ==
- Mirto (liqueur), alcoholic drink popular in the Mediterranean islands of Sardinia, Corsica and Capraia
- mirto, the common Italian name for myrtaceae plants, which the liqueur is named after
