= Bonifacio Chiovitti =

Italian archaeologist and politician (1810–1881)

Bonifacio Chiovitti (Bojano, June 1810 – Bojano, 25 October 1881) was an Italian archaeologist and politician.

== Biography ==
Chiovitti graduated with degrees in mathematics and medicine from the University of Naples. In 1860 he took part in the Risorgimento uprisings and in 1861 he became member of the "Consiglio Provinciale del Molise".

Chiovitti dedicated himself to the study of the archeology and ancient history of his region. During 1830-1880, he collected many archaeological findings coming from the Boiano area, including many Latin and Oscan inscriptions. He was member of the "Instituto di Corrispondenza Archeologica" (afterwards Deutsches Archäologisches Institut), member of the board of the "Commissione conservatrice" (1876) and inspector of excavations and monuments (from 1877). Chiovitti did not allow Mommsen to publish Latin inscriptions from Bovianum he had collected within the Corpus Inscriptionum Latinarum, vol. IX. Chiovitti collection of antiquities is still kept in his family palace in Boiano.

== Sources ==
- Gianfranco De Benedittis, 1986. «Le schede Chiovitti relative alle iscrizioni romane di Bovianum». Conoscenze. Rivista annuale della Soprintendenza archeologica e per i beni ambientali architettonici artistici e storici del Molise 3: 67–94.
- Capini, Stefania, e Angela Di Niro (eds.), 1991. Samnium: archeologia del Molise. Roma: Quasar.
