= Pietro Paolo Eustachi =

Italian Roman Catholic prelate

Most Reverend Pietro Paolo Eustachi
- Bishop of Boiano
- Church: Catholic Church
- Diocese: Diocese of Boiano
- In office: 1613–1622
- Predecessor: Fabrizio Degli Afflitti
- Successor: Ottaviano Garzadori

Personal details
- Born: 1580
- Died: 1622 (aged 41–42) Boiano, Italy

Pietro Paolo Eustachi (1580–1622) was a Roman Catholic prelate who served as Bishop of Boiano (1613–1622).

== Biography ==
Pietro Paolo Eustachi was born in 1580. On 15 July 1613, he was appointed by Pope Paul V as Bishop of Boiano. He served as Bishop of Boiano until his death in 1622.

== External links and additional sources ==
- Cheney, David M. "Archdiocese of Campobasso–Boiano". Catholic-Hierarchy.org. (for Chronology of Bishops) ^{[self-published]}
- Chow, Gabriel. "Metropolitan Archdiocese of Campobasso–Boiano (Italy)". GCatholic.org. (for Chronology of Bishops) ^{[self-published]}

Catholic Church titles
Preceded by Fabrizio Degli Afflitti	Bishop of Boiano; 1613–1622	Succeeded by Ottaviano Garzadori
