= Veroni =

Veroni is a Spanish surname. Notable people with the surname include:

- Craig Veroni (born 1969), South African-born Canadian actor
- Dante Veroni (1878–1949), Italian politician
- Petronio Veroni (1600–1653), Roman Catholic prelate
