= Caesar Nardi =

Roman Catholic prelate

Most Reverend Ottaviano Garzadoro
- Bishop of Ossero
- Church: Catholic Church
- Diocese: Diocese of Ossero
- In office: 1621–1633
- Predecessor: Ottaviano Garzadoro
- Successor: Marc'Antonio Verità

Personal details
- Died: 1633 Ossero, Croatia

Caesar Nardi (died 1633) was a Roman Catholic prelate who served as Bishop of Ossero (1621–1633).

== Biography ==
Caesar Nardi was born in 1572 and ordained a priest in the Order of Friars Minor Conventual. On 21 June 1621, he was appointed during the papacy of Pope Gregory XV as Bishop of Ossero. He served as Bishop of Ossero until his death in 1633.

Catholic Church titles
Preceded by Ottaviano Garzadoro	Bishop of Ossero; 1621–1633	Succeeded by Marc'Antonio Verità
