= Celestino Bruni =

Italian Roman Catholic prelate

Most Reverend Celestino Bruni
- Bishop of Boiano
- Church: Catholic Church
- Diocese: Diocese of Boiano
- In office: 1653–1664
- Predecessor: Petronio Veroni
- Successor: Giuseppe Protospatario

Orders
- Consecration: 7 September 1653 by Giovanni Battista Maria Pallotta

Personal details
- Born: 1585 Venice, Republic of Venice
- Died: 31 May 1664 (aged 78–79) Boiano, Kingdom of Naples

Celestino Bruni, O.S.A. also Celestino Bruno (1585 – 31 May 1664) was an Italian Roman Catholic prelate who served as Bishop of Boiano (1653–1664).

== Biography ==
Celestino Bruni was born in Venice, Republic of Venice and ordained a priest in the Order of Saint Augustine. On 18 August 1653, he was appointed by Pope Innocent X as Bishop of Boiano. On 7 September 1653, he was consecrated bishop by Giovanni Battista Maria Pallotta, Cardinal-Priest of San Pietro in Vincoli, with Ranuccio Scotti Douglas, Bishop Emeritus of Borgo San Donnino, and Patrizio Donati, Bishop Emeritus of Minori as co-consecrators. He served as Bishop of Boiano until his death on 31 May 1664.

He was the author of "Parva Logica", and Quodlibeticarum disputationum.

== External links and additional sources ==
- Cheney, David M. "Archdiocese of Campobasso–Boiano". Catholic-Hierarchy.org. (for Chronology of Bishops) ^{[self-published]}
- Chow, Gabriel. "Metropolitan Archdiocese of Campobasso–Boiano (Italy)". GCatholic.org.

Catholic Church titles
Preceded by Petronio Veroni	Bishop of Boiano; 1653–1664	Succeeded by Giuseppe Protospatario
