= Archdiocese of Campobasso-Boiano =

Latin Catholic archdiocese in Italy

Coordinates: 41.5604°N 14.6597°E

Archdiocese of Campobasso-Boiano Archidioecesis Campobassensis-Boianensis

Catholic
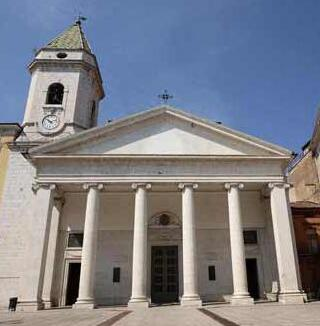
- Cathedral of Campobasso

Location
- Country: Italy
- Ecclesiastical province: Campobasso-Boiano

Statistics
- Area: 1,120 km^{2} (430 sq mi)
- Population: Total; Catholics: (as of 2023); 124,000 (est.) ▼; 120,500 (guess) ▲
- Parishes: 69

Information
- Denomination: Catholic Church
- Sui iuris church: Latin Church
- Rite: Roman Rite
- Established: 11th Century
- Cathedral: Cattedrale della Santissima Trinità (Campobasso)
- Co-cathedral: Concattedrale di S. Bartolomeo (Bojano)
- Secular priests: 75 (diocesan) ▼27 (Religious Orders) ▼19 Permanent Deacons ▼

Current leadership
- Pope: Leo XIV
- Archbishop: Biagio Colaianni
- Bishops emeritus: Armando Dini, Giancarlo Maria Bregantini, C.S.S.

Map
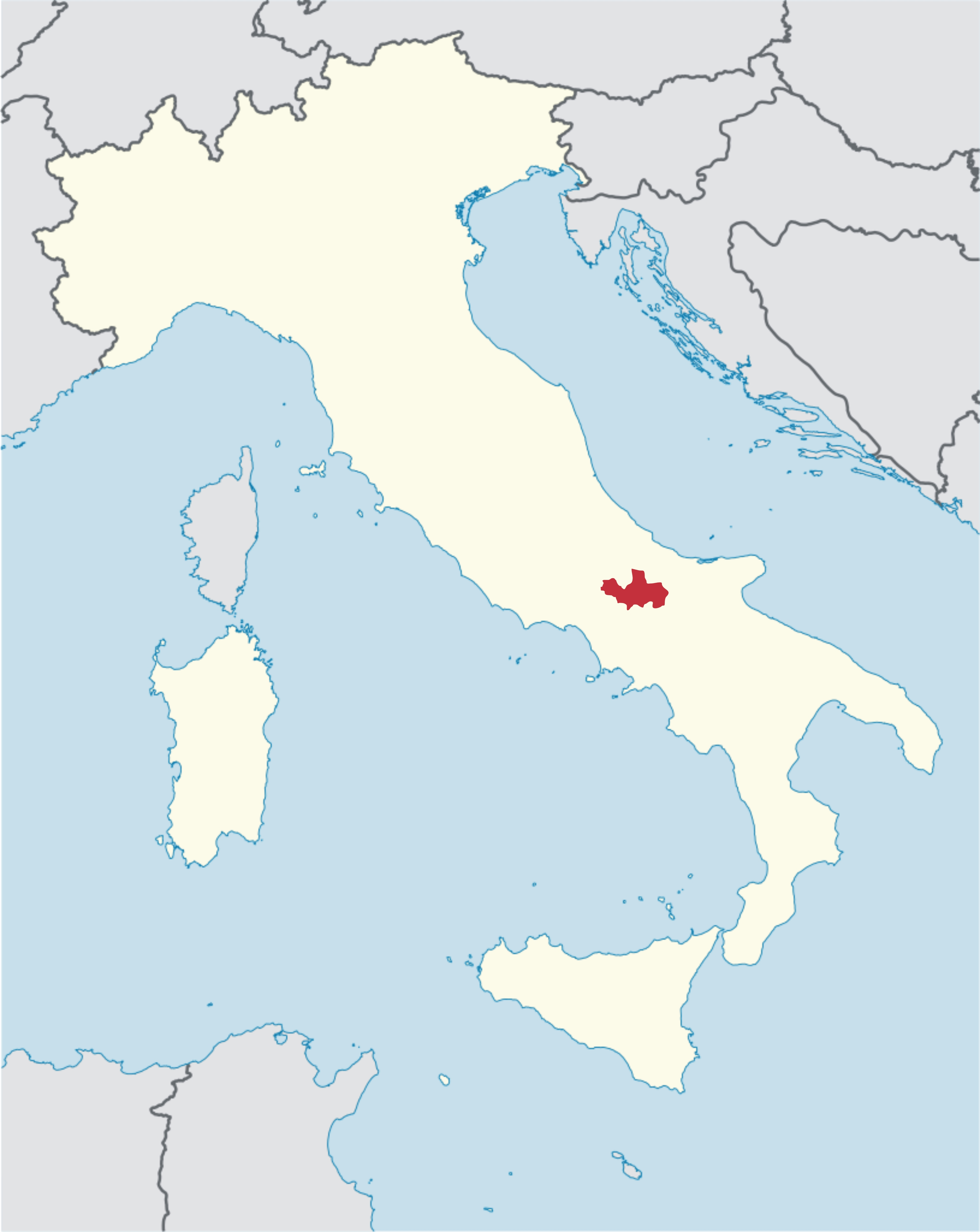

Website
- arcidiocesicampobasso.it (in Italian)

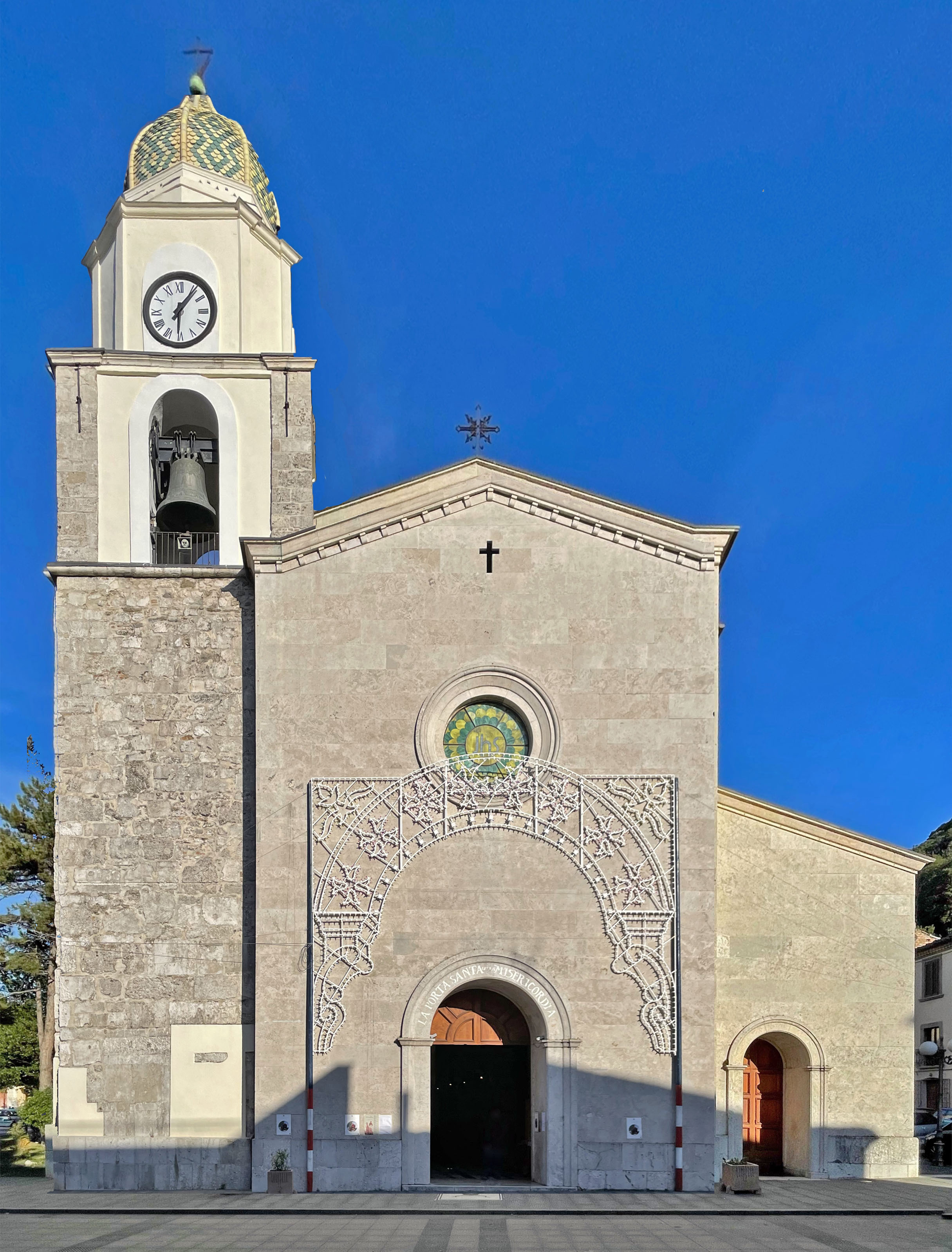
Collegiate Church of San Bartolomeo (Bojano) (former cathedral)

The Archdiocese of Campobasso-Boiano (Latin: Archidioecesis Campobassensis-Boianensis) is a Latin Church archdiocese of the Catholic Church in the commune of Campobasso, the capital of the province of Campobasso, in the region of Molise in Southern Italy. It became an archdiocese in 1973 and a metropolitan see in 1976.

In 1927, the episcopal seat and residence of the bishop of the diocese of Boiano was transferred to Campobasso, and the diocese was renamed diocese of Boiano-Campobasso. It was suffragan (subordinate) ecclesiastically to the archdiocese of Benevento.

== History ==
The name Laurentius often appears as the earliest known bishop of Bojano, and a participant in the third Roman synod of Pope Symmachus (498–514) in 501. It has been pointed out, however, that the manuscripts have variants: Bovianensis, Bobianensis, Boensis, Bonensis, Bononiensis, Bonomensis, Vovianensis, Vohianensis, Vivianensis. Giuseppe Cappelletti rejected the attribution of Laurentius to Bojano, and suggested Bobbio instead. But, as Francesco Lanzoni pointed out, the diocese of Bobbio is a later foundation. Pius Gams does not include Laurentius in his list of bishops of Bojano.

=== Suffragan of Benevento ===
In the second half of the 9th century, Boiano had its own gastald, who was subject to the Lombard prince of Benevento. Around 860, an alliance against the Saracens was entered into by the gastald of Boiano, the gastald of Telese, the count of Marsi, and the duke of Spoleto.

In 1047, Boiano was still subject to the archbishop of Benevento. On 24 January 1058, Pope Stephen IX confirmed the privileges and rights of Udalricus, Archbishop of Benevento, including the church of Boiano. In June 1061, an unnamed bishop of Boiano took part in the first provincial synod of Archbishop Udalricus of Benevento.

The first bishop of Boiano known by name is Adalberto (Alberto), who participated in the consecration of the major church at Montecassino by Pope Alexander II, on 1 October 1071.

Bishop Poliziano consecrated the cathedral in 1215, with the participation of the bishops of Lucera, Fiorentino, Ariano, and Tortiboli.

=== Destruction by emperor ===
In 1221, the city of Boiano was captured by Frederick II, and set to the torch. In his edict, the "Statutum de reparatione castrorum", Frederick provided for the construction, maintenance, and provision of certain fortresses throughout his domains, which were to be inspected every quarter by "provisores castrorum". In 1239, Frederick designated certain strategic castles as "castra exempta", which were to be administered directly by the "provisores castrorum." One of these was Bojano. The men of Boiano were assigned to keep the castrum in repair.

Others were: Giovanni (1226), who decorated the facade at his own expense, as recorded in an inscription; Silvio Pandoni (1489), who restored the work of Giovanni; Cardinal Franciotto Orsini (1519) and Bishop Carlo Carafa (1572), who adorned the cathedral with costly furnishings; and Celestino Bruni (1653), theologian and preacher.

A great earthquake struck the kingdom of Naples on 5 December 1456. The city of Boiano and nearly all the inhabitants were reported killed.

On 22 August 1794, Bishop Nicholas Rossetti held a diocesan synod in the cathedral of S. Bartolommeo in Boiano.

=== Destruction by earthquake ===
In the major earthquake of 26 July 1805, most of Boiano was destroyed, with 124 of the 3,433 inhabitants killed.

Francesco Macarone (1879–1897) presided over a diocesan synod, held from 25 to 27 August 1885.

=== Transfer of episcopal seat ===
On 29 June 1927, citing the size of the city of Campobasso and the superior transportation connections, Pope Pius XI ordered the transfer of the seat of the bishop of Boiano from Boiano to Campobasso. The church of Santissima Trinità was named a cathedral, and the Chapter of the cathedral of S. Bartholomew the Apostle in Boiano was transferred to Campobasso. The rights of the cathedral of Boiano were suppressed. The diocese was to be called "Boianensis-Campobassensis". The former archpriest of the cathedral of Boiano was appointed Archpresbyter-parochus of the cathedral of Campobasso.

The seminary of the diocese of Boiano was transferred to Campobasso, and the students from Boiano were exempted from paying the "pensio".

=== Promotion of diocese and bishop ===
On 11 February 1973, Pope Paul VI raised the diocese of Boiano-Campobasso to the rank of an archdiocese, and its bishop to the rank of archbishop. At the same time, he released the archdiocese from being a suffragan of the archdiocese of Benevento, and made it immediately subject to the Holy See (Papacy). On 5 March 1973, at a public consistory, Archbishop Alberto Carinci requested and received his pallium.

=== Metropolitan ===
Following the Second Vatican Council, and in accordance with the norms laid out in the council's decree, Christus Dominus chapter 40, Pope Paul VI ordered a reorganization of the ecclesiastical provinces in southern Italy. On 21 August 1976, he issued the decree "Ad apicem", creating the new ecclesiastical province entitled «Boianensis-Campobassensis», with its administrative center in Campobasso. The metropolitan archdiocese was assigned as suffragans the dioceses of Trivento (which had been immediately subject to the Holy See), Isernia-Venafro (which had been subject to the metropolitan archdiocese of Capua), and Termoli-Larino (which had been subject to the metropolitan archdiocese of Benevento.

==== Increase in territory ====
On 21 January 1983, Pope John Paul II issued the decree "Ad Uberius", by which he removed the towns of Sant'Angelo Limosano, Limosano, Matrice, Campolieto, Monacilioni, San Giovanni in Galdo, Toro, Campodipietra, Jelsi, Gildone, Gercemaggiore, Riccia, Gambatesa, Tufara, Pietracatella, Macchia Valfortore, S. Elia a Pianisi, from the ecclesiastical jurisdiction of the archbishop of Benevento and assigned them to the jurisdiction of the archbishop of Campobasso-Boiano.

== Bishops of Boiano ==
Latin Name: Boianensis
Erected: 11th Century

=== to 1450 ===
Metropolitan: Archdiocese of Benevento

...

- [Anonymous] (1061)

...

- Albertus (attested 1068 – 1089)

...

- ? Obertus (attested 1094)
- Bernardo (attested 1105)

...

- Adamon (attested 1119)

...

- Robertus (attested 1149)

...

- Andreas (attested 1179–1181)
- Petrus (attested 1189)
- Matthaeus (attested 1195–1203)
- Raynaldus (attested 1206–1210)
- Politianus (attested 1215)
- Joannes (attested 1225–1239)
- Joseph (attested 1244–1252)
- Palmerius (1252 – 1276)
- Joannes (1277 – c. 1290)
- Guilelmus Berge
- Angelus
- Petrus de Caserta, O.P.
- Andreas
- Bernerius Dohonella (attested 1337)
- G[ - - - ] (attested 1340)
- Angelus Lupara (1345 – 1364)
- Berardus de Castiglione (1364 – 1384?)
- Nicolaus Notarii Angeli de Melfia (1385 – ? ) Avignon Obedience
- Guilelmus (attested 1390) Roman Obedience
- Carolus (1396 – 1412)
- Joannes (1412)
- Nicolaus de Ferro (1413 – ? ) Administrator
- Nicolaus de S. Fraymundo (1423 – 1427)
- Pietro de S. Biagio, O.P. (1427 – 1430)
- Raimundus de Strongoli, O.S.Bas. (1430 – 1439)
- Andrea Veroli (1439 – 1452)

=== 1450 to 1774 ===
- Jacopo di Monte (1452 – 1458)
- Antonio da Teramo (1458 – 1463?)
- Odo degli Odoni (1464 –1489)
- Silvio Pandoni (1489 – 1519)

Franciotto Orsini (18 Jan 1519 – 24 Jul 1523 Resigned) Administrator

- Valentino Franco (1523 – 1549)
- Pirro Franco (1549 – 1572)
- Carlo Carafa (1572 – 1608)
- Fabrizio Degli Afflitti (10 Nov 1608 – 1613 Died)
- Pietro Paolo Eustachi (15 Jul 1613 – 1622 Died)
- Ottaviano Garzadori (19 Dec 1622 – 11 Mar 1624 Appointed, Archbishop of Zadar)
- Fulgenzio Gallucci, O.S.A. (11 Mar 1624 – 9 Nov 1632 Died)
- Pietro Filippi (26 Sep 1633 – 8 Sep 1640 Died)
- Filippo Benedetto de Sio, O.F.M. Conv. (21 Oct 1641 – 16 Aug 1651 Died)
- Petronio Veroni, O.S.A. (8 Jan 1652 – 11 May 1653 Died)
- Celestino Bruni (Bruno), O.S.A. (18 Aug 1653 – 31 May 1664)
- Giuseppe Protospatario (31 Mar 1664 – Sep 1665 Died)
- Antonio Graziani (15 Feb 1666 – May 1684 Died)
- Giovanni Riccanale (2 Oct 1684 – Mar 1685 Died)
- Francesco Antonio Giannone (10 Sep 1685 – Feb 1708 Died)
- Angelo Rendina (14 May 1708 – 15 Nov 1716 Died)
- Nunzio Baccari (14 Mar 1718 – 10 Jan 1738 Died)
- Domenico Antonio Manfredi (3 Mar 1738 – 10 Mar 1746 Died)
- Bernardo Cangiani (2 May 1746 – 26 Jan 1770 Resigned)
- Domenico Micillo (12 Mar 1770 – May 1774 Died)

=== 1774 to 1927 ===
- Nicolò Rossetti 1774 – 1819)
- Gennaro Pasca (1819 – 1828)
- Taddeo Garzilli (Garzillo) (23 Jun 1828 – 20 Jan 1834 Confirmed, Bishop of Sant’Agata de’ Goti)
- Giuseppe Riccardi (11 Jul 1836 – 19 Dec 1854 Died)
- Lorenzo Donato Antonio Moffa, O.F.M. (23 Mar 1855 – 1863 Died)
- Anastasio Laterza, O.C.D. (22 Dec 1871 – 19 Mar 1879 Died)
- Francesco Macarone (19 Mar 1879 – 27 Feb 1897 Died)
- Felice Gianfelice (19 Apr 1897 – 10 Jun 1916 Died)
- Alberto Romita (22 Mar 1917 – 29 June 1927)

=== Diocese of Boiano-Campobasso ===
Latin Name: Boianensis-Campobassensis
Name Changed: 29 June 1927
Metropolitan: Archdiocese of Benevento

- Alberto Romita (29 June 1927 – 14 Oct 1939 Died)
- Secondo Bologna (8 Jan 1940 – 11 Oct 1943 Died)
- Alberto Carinci (28 Apr 1948 – 11 February 1973)

=== Archdiocese of Boiano-Campobasso ===
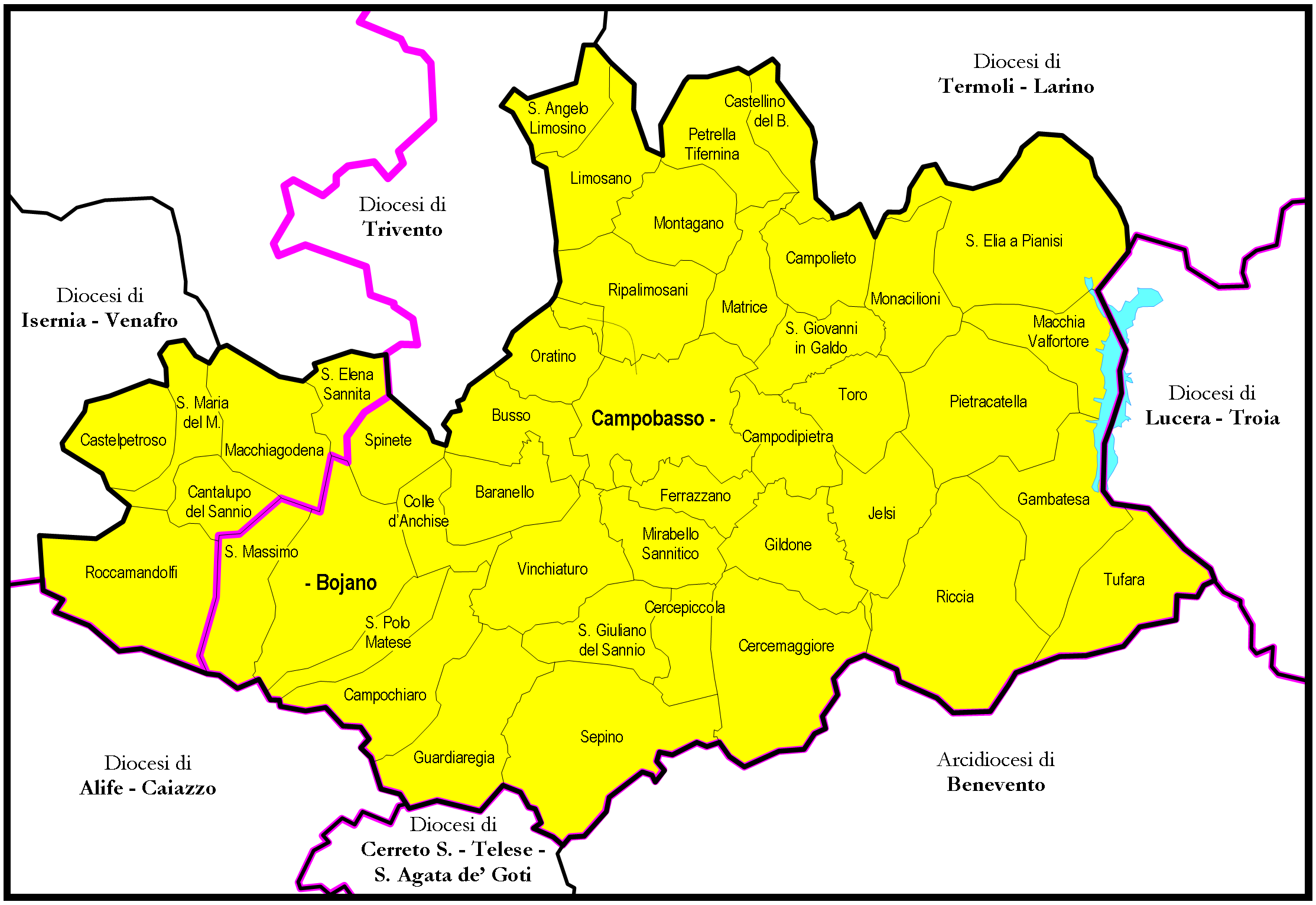
Map of archdiocese

Latin Name: Boianensis-Campobassensis
Elevated: 11 February 1973
Metropolitan See

- Alberto Carinci (11 February 1973 – 31 Jan 1977 Retired)
- Enzio d'Antonio (31 Jan 1977 – 24 Jun 1979 Resigned)
- Pietro Santoro (15 Oct 1979 – 28 Oct 1989 Retired)
- Ettore Di Filippo (28 Oct 1989 – 21 Nov 1998 Retired)
- Armando Dini (21 Nov 1998 – 8 Nov 2007 Retired)
- Giancarlo Maria Bregantini, C.S.S. (8 Nov 2007 – 6 Dec 2023)
- Biagio Colaianni (6 Dec 2023 –

== Suffragan sees ==
- Isernia-Venafro
- Termoli-Larino
- Trivento

== Books ==
=== Reference works ===
- Gams, Pius Bonifatius (1873). Series episcoporum Ecclesiae catholicae (in Latin). Ratisbon: Typis et Sumptibus Georgii Josephi Manz. p. 860.
- Eubel, Conradus, ed. (1913). Hierarchia catholica (in Latin). Vol. I (second ed.). Münster: Libreria Regensbergiana.
- Eubel, Conradus, ed. (1914). Hierarchia catholica (in Latin). Vol. II (second ed.). Münster: Libreria Regensbergiana.
- Eubel, Conradus; Gulik, Guilelmus (1923). Hierarchia catholica (in Latin). Vol. III (second ed.). Münster: Libreria Regensbergiana.
- Gauchat, Patritius (Patrice) (1935). Hierarchia catholica (in Latin). Vol. IV (1592-1667). Münster: Libraria Regensbergiana.
- Ritzler, Remigius; Sefrin, Pirminus (1952). Hierarchia catholica medii et recentis aevi (in Latin). Vol. V (1667-1730). Patavii: Messagero di S. Antonio.
- Ritzler, Remigius; Sefrin, Pirminus (1958). Hierarchia catholica medii et recentis aevi (in Latin). Vol. VI (1730-1799). Patavii: Messagero di S. Antonio.
- Ritzler, Remigius; Sefrin, Pirminus (1968). Hierarchia Catholica medii et recentioris aevi... (in Latin). Vol. VII (1800–1846). Monasterii: Libr. Regensburgiana.
- Remigius Ritzler; Pirminus Sefrin (1978). Hierarchia catholica Medii et recentioris aevi (in Latin). Vol. VIII (1846–1903). Il Messaggero di S. Antonio.
- Pięta, Zenon (2002). Hierarchia catholica medii et recentioris aevi... (in Latin). Vol. IX (1903-1922). Padua: Messagero di San Antonio. ISBN 978-88-250-1000-8.

=== Studies ===
- Cappelletti, Giuseppe (1864). Le chiese d'Italia: dalla loro origine sino ai nostri giorni (in Italian). Vol. XIX. Venezia: G. Antonelli. pp. 191–202.
- D'Avino, Vincenzo (1848). Cenni storici sulle chiese arcivescovili, vescovili, e prelatizie (nulluis) del Regno delle Due Sicilie (in Italian). Napoli: Ranucci. pp. 73–78. [article written by Giuseppe Berardinelli]
- De Francesco, A. (1910), "Origini e sviluppo del Feudalismo nel Molise fino alla caduta della dominazione Normanna," (in Italian), in: Archivio storico per le province napoletane, Volume 35 (Napoli 1910), pp. 71–72.
- Kehr, Paulus Fridolin (1962). Italia pontificia. Regesta pontificum Romanorum. Vol. IX: Samnia – Apulia – Lucania. Berlin: Weidmann. (in Latin). pp. 199–200.
- Masciotta, Giambattista (1914). Il Molise dalle origini ai nostri giorni. Vol. I - La provincia di Molise (in Italian). Napoli: Luigi Pierro 1914.
- Muccilli, Oreste. (1995). "Brevi notizie storiche sulla Cattedrale di Bojano fra i secoli XI e XIX," (in Italian), in: Conoscenze 8 (1995), pp. 9.
- Ughelli, Ferdinando; Coleti, Nicolaus (1721). Italia sacra, sive de episcopis Italiae, et insularum adjacentium (in Latin). Vol. Tomus octavus (8). Venezia: Apud Sebastianum Coleti. pp. 241–249.

==== External links ====
- Cheney, David M. "Archdiocese of Campobasso–Boiano". Catholic-Hierarchy.org. ^{[self-published]}
- Chow, Gabriel. "Metropolitan Archdiocese of Campobasso–Boiano (Italy)". GCatholic.org. ^{[self-published]}
