= Johann Nopel der Jüngere =

German Roman Catholic prelate

Most Reverend Johann Nopel der Jüngere
- Auxiliary Bishop of Cologne; Titular Bishop of Cyrene
- Church: Catholic Church
- In office: 1601–1605

Orders
- Consecration: 10 Mar 1602 by Coriolani Garzadoro

Personal details
- Born: 6 Jan 1548 Lippstadt, Germany
- Died: 6 Jun 1605 (age 57) Cologne, Germany

Johann Nopel der Jüngere (6 Jan 1548 – 6 Jun 1605) was a Roman Catholic prelate who served as Auxiliary Bishop of Cologne (1601-1605).

== Biography ==
Johann Nopel der Jüngere was born in Lippstadt on 6 Jan 1548. On 10 Sep 1601, he was appointed during the papacy of Pope Clement VIII as Auxiliary Bishop of Cologne and Titular Bishop of Cyrene. On 10 Mar 1602, he was consecrated bishop by Coriolani Garzadoro, Bishop of Ossero. He served as Auxiliary Bishop of Cologne until his death on 6 Jun 1605.

== External links and additional sources ==
- Cheney, David M. "Cyrene (Titular See)". Catholic-Hierarchy.org. (for Chronology of Bishops) ^{[self-published]}
- Chow, Gabriel. "Titular Episcopal See of Cyrene (Libya)". GCatholic.org. (for Chronology of Bishops) ^{[self-published]}
- Cheney, David M. "Archdiocese of Köln {Cologne}". Catholic-Hierarchy.org. (for Chronology of Bishops) ^{[self-published]}
- Chow, Gabriel. "Metropolitan Archdiocese of Köln (Germany)". GCatholic.org. (for Chronology of Bishops) ^{[self-published]}
