= Fulgenzio Gallucci =

Italian Catholic prelate (1570–1632)

Most Reverend Fulgenzio Gallucci
- Bishop of Boiano
- Church: Catholic Church
- Diocese: Diocese of Boiano
- In office: 1624–1632
- Predecessor: Ottaviano Garzadori
- Successor: Pietro Filippi

Orders
- Consecration: 5 June 1623 by Ottavio Bandini

Personal details
- Born: 1570 Montegiorgio, Italy
- Died: 9 November 1632 (age 62) Boiano, Italy

Fulgenzio Gallucci (1570 – 9 November 1632) was a Catholic prelate who served as Bishop of Boiano (1624–1632) and Titular Bishop of Thagaste.

== Biography ==
Fulgenzio Gallucci was born in Montegiorgio, Italy and ordained a priest in the Order of Saint Augustine. On 23 May 1623, he was appointed by Pope Gregory XV as Titular Bishop of Thagaste. On 5 June 1623, he was consecrated bishop by Ottavio Bandini, Cardinal-Bishop of Palestrina, with Ottavio Accoramboni, Archbishop Emeritus of Urbino, and Ludovico Sarego, Bishop Emeritus of Adria as co-consecrators. On 11 March 1624, he was appointed by Pope Urban VIII as Bishop of Boiano. He served as Bishop of Boiano until his death on 9 November 1632.

== External links and additional sources ==
- Cheney, David M. "Thagaste (Titular See)". Catholic-Hierarchy.org. (for Chronology of Bishops) ^{[self-published]}
- Chow, Gabriel. "Titular Episcopal See of Thagaste (Algeria)". GCatholic.org. (for Chronology of Bishops) ^{[self-published]}
- Cheney, David M. "Archdiocese of Campobasso–Boiano". Catholic-Hierarchy.org. (for Chronology of Bishops) ^{[self-published]}
- Chow, Gabriel. "Metropolitan Archdiocese of Campobasso–Boiano (Italy)". GCatholic.org. (for Chronology of Bishops) ^{[self-published]}

Catholic Church titles
| Preceded by Vincenzo Giovanni Spínola | Titular Bishop of Thagaste; 1623–1624 | Succeeded by Giovanni Delfino (cardinal) |
| Preceded by Ottaviano Garzadori | Bishop of Boiano; 1624–1632 | Succeeded by Pietro Filippi |
