= Carlo Carafa (bishop of Boiano) =

Italian Catholic bishop (died 1608)

Most Reverend Carlo Carafa
- Bishop of Boiano
- Church: Catholic Church
- Diocese: Diocese of Boiano
- In office: 1572–1608
- Successor: Fabrizio Degli Afflitti

Orders
- Consecration: 1 June 1567 by Scipione Rebiba

Personal details
- Died: 29 September 1608 Boiano, Italy

Carlo Carafa (died 29 September 1608) was a Roman Catholic prelate who served as Bishop of Boiano (1572–1608) and Bishop of Guardialfiera (1567–1572).

== Biography ==
On 23 May 1567, Carlo Carafa was appointed during the papacy of Pope Pius V as Bishop of Guardialfiera. On 1 June 1567, he was consecrated bishop by Scipione Rebiba, Cardinal-Priest of Sant'Angelo in Pescheria, with Giulio Antonio Santorio, Archbishop of Santa Severina, and Egidio Valenti, Bishop of Nepi e Sutri, serving as co-consecrators. On 4 July 1572, he was appointed during the papacy of Pope Gregory XIII as Bishop of Boiano. He served as Bishop of Boiano until his death on 29 September 1608.

== External links and additional sources ==
- Cheney, David M. "Archdiocese of Campobasso–Boiano". Catholic-Hierarchy.org. (for Chronology of Bishops) ^{[self-published]}
- Chow, Gabriel. "Metropolitan Archdiocese of Campobasso–Boiano (Italy)". GCatholic.org. (for Chronology of Bishops) ^{[self-published]}
- Cheney, David M. "Diocese of Guardialfiera (Guardia)". Catholic-Hierarchy.org. (for Chronology of Bishops) ^{[self-published]}
- Chow, Gabriel. "Titular Episcopal See of Guardialfiera (Italy)". GCatholic.org. (for Chronology of Bishops) ^{[self-published]}

Catholic Church titles
Preceded by Giovanni Battista Lomellino	Bishop of Guardialfiera; 1567–1572	Succeeded by Alticotius de Alticotiis
Preceded by	Bishop of Boiano; 1572–1608	Succeeded by Fabrizio Degli Afflitti
