= Apsorrus =

Apsorrus or Apsoros (Ancient Greek: Ἄψορρος) may refer to:

- Osor, Croatia, a town
- Lošinj, an island adjacent to the town
