= Antonio Graziani =

Italian Roman Catholic bishop (1666–1684)

Most Reverend Antonio Graziani
- Bishop of Boiano
- Church: Catholic Church
- Diocese: Diocese of Boiano
- In office: 1666–1684
- Predecessor: Giuseppe Protospatario
- Successor: Giovanni Riccanale

Personal details
- Born: 21 November 1620 S. Archangelo
- Died: May 1684 (age 63) Boiano, Italy

Antonio Graziani (21 November 1620 – May, 1684) was a Roman Catholic prelate who served as Bishop of Boiano (1666–1684).

== Biography ==
Antonio Graziani was born on 21 November 1620. On 15 February 1666, he was appointed by Pope Alexander VII as Bishop of Boiano. He served as Bishop of Boiano until his death in May 1684. While bishop, he served as the principal co-consecrator of Agostino Flavio Macedonich, Bishop of Stagno, Arcangelo de Chilento, Bishop of L’Aquila, Ignatius Fiumi, Bishop of Polignano, and Bernardino Masseri, Bishop of Anagni.

== External links and additional sources ==
- Cheney, David M. "Archdiocese of Campobasso–Boiano". Catholic-Hierarchy.org. (for Chronology of Bishops) ^{[self-published]}
- Chow, Gabriel. "Metropolitan Archdiocese of Campobasso–Boiano (Italy)". GCatholic.org. (for Chronology of Bishops) ^{[self-published]}

Catholic Church titles
Preceded by Giuseppe Protospatario	Bishop of Boiano; 1666–1684	Succeeded by Giovanni Riccanale
