= Fabrizio Degli Afflitti =

Most Reverend Fabrizio Degli Afflitti
- Bishop of Boiano
- Church: Catholic Church
- Diocese: Diocese of Boiano
- In office: 1608–1613
- Predecessor: Carlo Carafa (bishop)
- Successor: Pietro Paolo Eustachi

Orders
- Consecration: 23 November 1608 by Marcello Lante della Rovere

Personal details
- Born: 1572 Naples, Italy
- Died: 1613 (age 41) Boiano, Italy

Fabrizio Degli Afflitti (1572–1613) was a Catholic prelate who served as Bishop of Boiano (1608–1613).

== Biography ==
Fabrizio Degli Afflitti was born in Naples, Italy. On 10 November 1608, he was appointed by Pope Paul V as Bishop of Boiano. On 23 November 1608, he was consecrated bishop by Marcello Lante della Rovere, Bishop of Todi with Giovanni Battista del Tufo, Bishop of Acerra, and Paolo De Curtis, Bishop of Isernia, serving as principal co-consecrators. He served as Bishop of Boiano until his death in 1613.

== External links and additional sources ==
- Cheney, David M. "Archdiocese of Campobasso–Boiano". Catholic-Hierarchy.org. (for Chronology of Bishops) ^{[self-published]}
- Chow, Gabriel. "Metropolitan Archdiocese of Campobasso–Boiano (Italy)". GCatholic.org. (for Chronology of Bishops) ^{[self-published]}

Catholic Church titles
Preceded by Carlo Carafa (bishop)	Bishop of Boiano; 1608–1613	Succeeded by Pietro Paolo Eustachi
