= Giuseppe Protospatario =

Most Reverend Giuseppe Protospatario
- Bishop of Boiano
- Church: Catholic Church
- Diocese: Diocese of Boiano
- In office: 1664–1665
- Predecessor: Celestino Bruni
- Successor: Antonio Graziani

Personal details
- Died: September 1665 Boiano, Italy

Giuseppe Protospatario (died September 1665) was a Roman Catholic prelate who served as Bishop of Boiano (1664–1665).

== Biography ==
On 31 March 1664, Giuseppe Protospatario was appointed by Pope Alexander VII as Bishop of Boiano. He served as Bishop of Boiano until his death in September 1665.

== External links and additional sources ==
- Cheney, David M. "Archdiocese of Campobasso–Boiano". Catholic-Hierarchy.org. (for Chronology of Bishops) ^{[self-published]}
- Chow, Gabriel. "Metropolitan Archdiocese of Campobasso–Boiano (Italy)". GCatholic.org. (for Chronology of Bishops) ^{[self-published]}

Catholic Church titles
Preceded by Celestino Bruni	Bishop of Boiano; 1664–1665	Succeeded by Antonio Graziani
