= Pietro Filippi =

Italian Roman Catholic prelate

Most Reverend Pietro Filippi
- Bishop of Boiano
- Church: Catholic Church
- Diocese: Diocese of Boiano
- In office: 1633–1640
- Predecessor: Fulgenzio Gallucci
- Successor: Filippo Benedetto de Sio

Orders
- Consecration: 2 October 1633 by Giovanni Battista Pamphili

Personal details
- Died: 8 September 1640 Boiano, Italy

Bishop Pietro Filippi (died 8 September 1640) was a Roman Catholic prelate who served as Bishop of Boiano (1633–1640).

== Biography ==
On 26 September 1633, he was appointed by Pope Urban VIII as Bishop of Boiano. On 2 October 1633, he was consecrated bishop by Giovanni Battista Pamphili, Cardinal-Priest of Sant’Eusebio, with Luca Cellesi, Bishop of Martirano, and Antonio Brunachio, Bishop of Conversano as co-consecrators. He served as Bishop of Boiano until his death on 8 September 1640.

Catholic Church titles
Preceded by Fulgenzio Gallucci	Bishop of Boiano; 1633–1640	Succeeded by Filippo Benedetto de Sio
