= Filippo Benedetto de Sio =

Most Reverend Filippo Benedetto de Sio
- Bishop of Boiano
- Church: Catholic Church
- Diocese: Diocese of Boiano
- In office: 1641–1651
- Predecessor: Pietro Filippi
- Successor: Petronio Veroni
- Previous post: Bishop of Caiazzo (1623–1641)

Orders
- Consecration: 31 December 1623 by Denis-Simon de Marquemont

Personal details
- Born: 30 November 1585 Cava, Italy
- Died: 16 August 1651 (aged 65) Boiano, Italy

Filippo Benedetto de Sio (30 November 1585 – 16 August 1651) was a Roman Catholic prelate who served as Bishop of Boiano (1641–1651) and Bishop of Caiazzo (1623–1641).

== Biography ==
Filippo Benedetto de Sio was born in Cava, Italy and ordained a priest in the Order of Friars Minor Conventual. On 8 December 1623, he was appointed by Pope Urban VIII as Bishop of Caiazzo. On 31 December 1623, he was consecrated bishop by Denis-Simon de Marquemont, Archbishop of Lyon, with François Boyvin de Péricard, Bishop of Evreux, and Girolamo Tantucci, Bishop of Grosseto as co-consecrators. On 21 October 1641, he was appointed by Pope Urban VIII as Bishop of Boiano. He served as Bishop of Boiano until his death on 16 August 1651.

== External links and additional sources ==
- Cheney, David M. "Diocese of Caiazzo". Catholic-Hierarchy.org. (for Chronology of Bishops) ^{[self-published]}
- Chow, Gabriel. "Diocese of Caiazzo (Italy)". GCatholic.org. (for Chronology of Bishops) ^{[self-published]}
- Cheney, David M. "Archdiocese of Campobasso–Boiano". Catholic-Hierarchy.org. (for Chronology of Bishops) ^{[self-published]}
- Chow, Gabriel. "Metropolitan Archdiocese of Campobasso–Boiano (Italy)". GCatholic.org. (for Chronology of Bishops) ^{[self-published]}

Catholic Church titles
Preceded by Paolo Filomarino	Bishop of Caiazzo; 1623–1641	Succeeded by Sigismondo Taddei
Preceded by Pietro Filippi	Bishop of Boiano; 1641–1651	Succeeded by Petronio Veroni
