= Marc'Antonio Verità =

Most Reverend Marc'Antonio Verità
- Bishop of Osser
- Church: Catholic Church
- Diocese: Diocese of Ossero
- In office: 1633–165
- Predecessor: Caesar Nardi
- Successor: Giovanni de Rossi (bishop)

Orders
- Consecration: 28 August 1633 by Marcello Lante della Rovere

Personal details
- Died: 1650 Osor, Croatia

Marc'Antonio Verità or Antonius de Verita (died 15 October 1650) was a Roman Catholic prelate who served as Bishop of Ossero (1633–1650).

== Biography ==
On 18 July 1633, Marc'Antonio Verità was appointed during the papacy of Pope Urban VIII as Bishop of Ossero. On 28 August 1633, he was consecrated bishop by Marcello Lante della Rovere, Cardinal-Bishop of Frascati, with Francesco Maria Brancaccio, Bishop of Capaccio, and Giulio Saraceni, Bishop of Pula, with serving as co-consecrators. He served as Bishop of Ossero until his death on 15 October 1650.

Catholic Church titles
Preceded by Caesar Nardi	Bishop of Ossero; 1633–1650	Succeeded by Giovanni de Rossi (bishop)
