= Giovanni Riccanale =

Italian Roman Catholic prelate (1634–1685)

Most Reverend Giovanni Riccanale
- Bishop of Boiano
- Church: Catholic Church
- Diocese: Diocese of Boiano
- In office: 1684–1685
- Predecessor: Antonio Graziani
- Successor: Francesco Antonio Giannone

Orders
- Consecration: 8 October 1684 by Alessandro Crescenzi (cardinal)

Personal details
- Born: 1634 Teramo, Italy
- Died: March 1685 (age 51) Boiano, Italy

Giovanni Riccanale (1634 – March, 1685) was a Roman Catholic prelate who served as Bishop of Boiano (1684–1685).

== Biography ==
Giovanni Riccanale was born in Teramo, Italy in 1634. On 2 October 1684, he was appointed during the papacy of Pope Innocent XI as Bishop of Boiano. On 8 October 1684, he was consecrated bishop by Alessandro Crescenzi (cardinal), Cardinal-Priest of Santa Prisca, with Pier Antonio Capobianco, Bishop Emeritus of Lacedonia, and Benedetto Bartolo, Bishop of Belcastro, serving as co-consecrators. He served as Bishop of Boiano until his death in March 1685.

== External links and additional sources ==
- Cheney, David M. "Archdiocese of Campobasso–Boiano". Catholic-Hierarchy.org. (for Chronology of Bishops) ^{[self-published]}
- Chow, Gabriel. "Metropolitan Archdiocese of Campobasso–Boiano (Italy)". GCatholic.org. (for Chronology of Bishops) ^{[self-published]}

Catholic Church titles
Preceded by Antonio Graziani	Bishop of Boiano; 1684–1685	Succeeded by Francesco Antonio Giannone
