= Roman Catholic Diocese of Ossero =

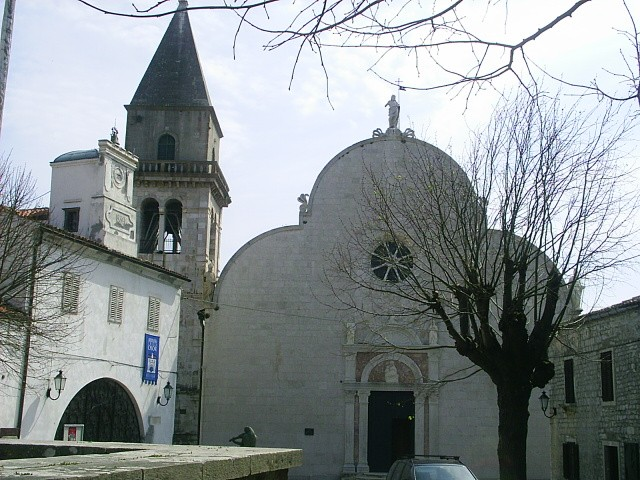
Episcopal Church of St. Mary, located in Osor

The Diocese of Ossero or Diocese of Osor (Latin: Dioecesis Arbensis) was a Roman Catholic diocese located in the port town of Ossero on the island of Cres in Primorje-Gorski Kotar County in western Croatia. In 1828, it was suppressed along with the Diocese of Arbe to the Diocese of Krk. In 1933 it was restored as a Titular Episcopal See.

== Ordinaries ==
=== Diocese of Ossero ===
Erected: 600
Latin Name: Auxerensis seu Ausarensis seu Absorensis

- Pietro Leon (6 Feb 1436 Appointed – 4 Jun 1445 Appointed, Bishop of Ceneda)
- Simeon de Valle (9 Jun 1445 Appointed – 1449 Died)
- Domenico (28 Jul 1449 Appointed – 1450 Died)
- Antonio de Pago (12 Jan 1451 Appointed – 29 Mar 1471 Appointed, Bishop of Kotor)
- Marco Negro (29 Mar 1471 Appointed – 20 Jul 1485 Died)
- Giovanni Robobello (5 Nov 1485 Appointed – 6 Jan 1491 Appointed, Bishop of Feltre)
- Giovanni Giusto (6 Jan 1491 Appointed – )
- Juan Bautista Garzón ( 1514 Appointed – 1516 Died)
- Marco Fedele Gonzaga (2 Jun 1550 Appointed – 28 Nov 1574 Appointed, Bishop of Mantova)
- Coriolani Garzadoro (Coriolani Garzadori) (19 Jan 1575 Appointed – 1614 Resigned)
- Ottaviano Garzadoro (Ottaviano Garzadori) (17 Mar 1614 Appointed – 1620 Died)
- Caesar Nardi, O.F.M. Conv. (21 Jun 1621 Appointed – 1633 Died)
- Marc'Antonio Verità (18 Jul 1633 Appointed – 1653 Died)
- Giovanni de Rossi (bishop) (10 Nov 1653 Appointed – 1667 Died)
- Matthieu Scrivanelli (3 Aug 1667 Appointed – Dec 1672 Died)
- Simon Gaudenti (30 Jan 1673 Appointed – Sep 1719 Died)
- Nicolò Drasich (16 Sep 1720 Appointed – Dec 1737 Died)
- Giovanni Ferro (19 Dec 1738 Appointed – 27 May 1742 Died)
- Mattaeus Caraman (9 Jul 1742 Appointed – 22 Nov 1745 Appointed, Archbishop of Zadar)
- Nicolò Drasich (22 Nov 1745 Appointed – 3 Jan 1757 Appointed, Archbishop of Split)
- Bonaventura Bernardi (3 Jan 1757 Appointed – 21 Feb 1781 Died)
- Simon Spalatin (25 Jun 1781 Appointed – 10 Feb 1798 Died)
- Francesco Pietro Raccamarich (20 Jul 1801 Appointed – 21 Jan 1815 Died)

Suppressed: 30 June 1828 to the Diocese of Krk

== See also ==
- Catholic Church in Croatia
