= Diocese of Caiazzo =

The Diocese of Caiazzo is a former Roman Catholic ecclesiastical territory in the province of Caserta, southern Italy, abolished in 1986, when it was united into the Diocese of Alife-Caiazzo. It was a suffragan of the archdiocese of Capua.

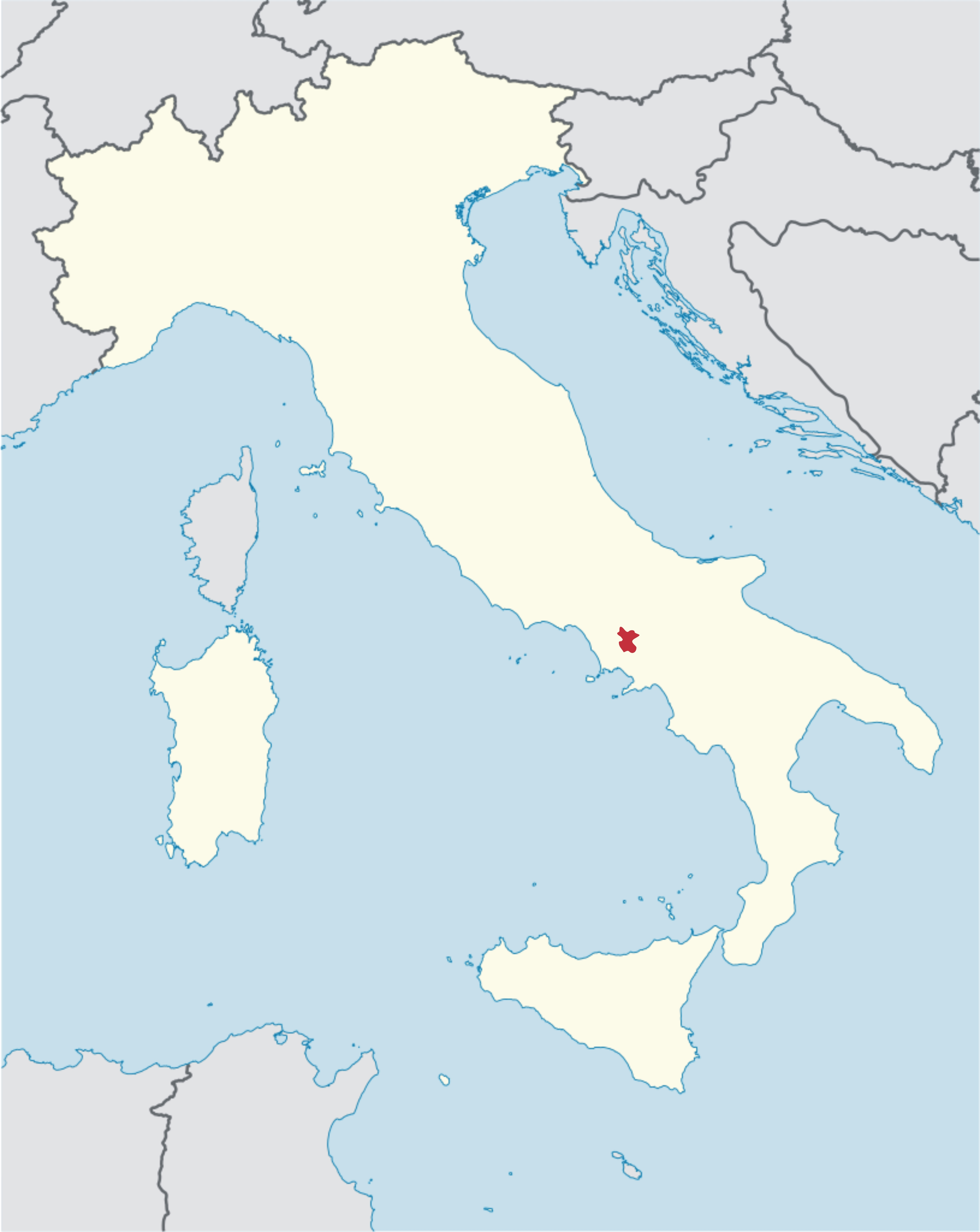
Map of diocese of Caiazzo

== History ==
According to legend, Christianity was introduced into Caiazzo by Priscus, one of the seventy-two disciples of Jesus, first Bishop of Capua. The story is universally rejected. The first known bishop of Caiazzo was said to have been Arigisus, the exact time of whose episcopate is uncertain; however, as the name indicates, it could not have been before the beginning of the seventh century, when the Lombards settled in that region, since his name appears to be Lombard. The first documentary evidence for the Church of Caiazzo comes in a privilege granted by the Archbishop John of Capua to Bishop Urso; Archbishop John was consecrated in 967.

=== Cathedral and Chapter ===
The cathedral of Caiazzo was dedicated to the Virgin Mary and to Saint Stephen of Macerata, the eleventh century Bishop of Caiazzo. The cathedral was consecrated on 23 July 1284, by Cardinal Gerardo Bianchi, Bishop of Sabina and papal Legate in Sicily.

The cathedral was staffed and administered by a corporate body, the Chapter, composed of three dignities (the Archdeacon, and two Primicerii) and twenty Canons (two of whom are designated Theologus and Primicerius, in accordance with the decrees of the Council of Trent). In 1696, there were twenty-two Canons.

There was also a Collegiate Church, Santissima Annunziata, served by a college of eight chaplains.

The diocesan seminary of Cajazzo was founded by Bishop Fabio Mirto Frangipani, who had been one of the secretaries of the Council of Trent. It had space for seventy resident students, from grade school through high school.

=== Concordat of 1818 ===
Following the extinction of the Napoleonic Kingdom of Italy, the Congress of Vienna authorized the restoration of the Papal States and the Kingdom of Naples. Since the French occupation had seen the abolition of many Church institutions in the Kingdom, as well as the confiscation of most Church property and resources, it was imperative that Pope Pius VII and King Ferdinand IV reach agreement on restoration and restitution. Ferdinand, however, was not prepared to accept the pre-Napoleonic situation, in which Naples was a feudal subject of the papacy. Lengthy, detailed, and acrimonious negotiations ensued.

In 1818, a new concordat with the Kingdom of the Two Sicilies committed the pope to the suppression of more than fifty small dioceses in the kingdom. The ecclesiastical province of Naples was spared from any suppressions, but the province of Capua was affected. Pope Pius VII, in the bull "De Utiliori" of 27 June 1818, chose to unite the two dioceses of Calvi and Teano under the leadership of one bishop, aeque principaliter. He also suppressed the diocese of Venafro completely, and assigned its people and territory to the diocese of Isernia. Similarly, Carinola was suppressed and assigned to Suessa. Caiazzo was suppressed, and assigned to the diocese of Caserta. The cathedral of Caiazzo was reduced to the status of a collegiate church. In the same concordat, the King was confirmed in the right to nominate candidates for vacant bishoprics, subject to the approval of the pope. That situation persisted down until the final overthrow of the Bourbon monarchy in 1860.

The diocese of Caiazzo was revived, however, and a new bishop was appointed on 15 March 1852. Caserta lost the territory which it had gained in 1818.

=== Suppression of the diocese ===
On 18 February 1984, the Vatican and the Italian State signed a new and revised concordat, which was accompanied in the next year by enabling legislation. According to the agreement, the practice of having one bishop govern two separate dioceses at the same time, aeque personaliter, was abolished. Otherwise Caiazzo and Alise, who shared a bishop, might have become the diocese of Alise e Caiazzo. Instead, the Vatican continued consultations which had begun under Pope John XXIII for the merging of small dioceses, especially those with personnel and financial problems, into one combined diocese. On 30 September 1986, Pope John Paul II ordered that the dioceses of Caiazzo and Alise be merged into one diocese with one bishop, with the Latin title Dioecesis Aliphana-Caiacensis o Caiatina. The seat of the diocese was to be in Alise, and the cathedral of Alise was to serve as the cathedral of the merged diocese. The cathedral in Caiazzo was to become a co-cathedral, and the cathedral Chapter was to be a Capitulum Concathedralis. There was to be only one diocesan Tribunal, in Alise, and likewise one seminary, one College of Consultors, and one Priests' Council. The territory of the new diocese was to include the territory of the former dioceses of Caiazzo and Alise.

== Bishops of Caiazzo ==
Erected: 9th Century
Metropolitan: Archdiocese of Capua

=== to 1300 ===
...

- Ursus
- Stephanus Menecillo (979–1021/1023)
- Giaquinto (attested 1023–1060)
- Ferdinandus (attested 1070–1082)
- Constantinus (attested 1098, 1100, 1105)
- Petrus (attested 1106–1109)
- Thomas (attested 1109)
- Ursus (attested 1117–1133)
- Statius (attested 1133–1155)
- Willelmus (attested 1155–1168)
- Willelmus (attested 1170–1181)
- Doferius (attested 1183–1189)
- Joannes (1195–1224)
- Jacobus (1225–1253)
- Nicolaus (1254–1257)

Andreas (1239) intruded

- Joannes (attested 1274–1275)
- Andrea de Ducenta (attested 1275–1283)
- Gerardus di Narnia (1284–1293)
- Petrus (1294–1308)

=== 1300 to 1800 ===
- Joannes (1308-1309)
- Thomas de Pascasio (1309–1333)
- Giovanni Mottola (1333–1356)
- Rogerius Valenti (1362?–1375)
- Francesco Zoncati (1375–1378)
- Bartholomaeus de Tuderto (1383–1393?) Avignon Obedience
- Giovanni Antonio Gattola (1391–1393) Roman Obedience
- Francesco (1393–1404) Roman Obedience
- Andreas Serao (1404–1422) Roman Obedience
- Joannes Serao (1422–1445)
- Antonio d'Errico (1446–1472)
- Giuliano Frangipane (1472–1480)
- Giacomo de Luciis (1480–1506)

Cardinal Oliviero Carafa (1506–1507) Administrator

- Vincio Maffa (1507–1517)

Cardinal Andrea della Valle (1517–1518) Administrator

- Galeazzo Butrigario (1518)
- Bernardino de Prato de Cherio, O.Min.Conv. (1520-1522)
- Vianesio Albergati (1522–1527)
- Ascanio Parisani (1528–1529) Bishop-elect

Cardinal Antonio Maria Ciocchi del Monte (1529) Administrator

- Alexander Mirto Frangipani (18 Jun 1529 – 10 Jul 1537 Resigned)
- Fabio Mirto Frangipani (10 Jul 1537 – 5 Nov 1572 Resigned)
- Ottavio Mirto Frangipani (1572–1592)
- Horatius Acquaviva d'Aragona (19 Jun 1592 – 13 Jun 1617)
- Paolo Filomarino, C.R. (18 Sep 1617 – 27 May 1623 )
- Filippo Benedetto de Sio (1623–1641)
- Sigismondo Taddei (27 Nov 1641 – 2 Oct 1647)
- Franciscus Perrone (23 Nov 1648 – 2 Oct 1656)
- Giuseppe Petagna (15 Jan 1657 – 12 Sep 1679)
- Giacomo Villani (27 Nov 1679 – 5 Nov 1690)
- Francesco Giambattista Bonesana, C.R. (24 Mar 1692 – 14 Nov 1695 Appointed, Bishop of Como)
- Maioranus Figlioli (20 Feb 1696 – 27 May 1712)
- Giacomo Falconi (14 Mar 1718 – 28 Aug 1727)
- Costantino Vigilante (26 Nov 1727 – 27 Apr 1754)
- Giuseppe Antonio Piperni (22 Jul 1754 – 14 Oct 1780)
- Filippo d’Ambrogio (27 Feb 1792 – 3 Apr 1799)

=== 1800 to 1986 ===
Sede vacante (1799–1818)

From 1818 to 1852, the diocese was suppressed, and its territory became part of the diocese of Caserta.

- Gabriele Ventriglia (15 Mar 1852 – 10 Dec 1859 Died)
- Luigi Riccio (23 Mar 1860 – 9 Nov 1873 Died)
- Giuseppe Spinelli (15 Jun 1874 – 14 Nov 1883 Died)
- Raffaele Danise (24 Mar 1884 – 8 Jan 1898 Died)
- Felice de Siena (24 Mar 1898 – 26 Jan 1902 Died)
- Federico de Martino (20 Jun 1902 – 1907 Resigned)
- Adolfo Turchi (30 Jun 1909 – 8 Sep 1914 Resigned)
- Luigi Ermini (1914–1921)
- Nicola Maria di Girolamo (16 Aug 1922 – 5 Jul 1963 Died)

Sede vacante (1963–1978)

- Angelo Campagna (8 Apr 1978 –1986)

=== Diocese of Alife-Caiazzo ===
United: 30 September 1986 with the Diocese of Alife
Latin Name: Aliphanus-Caiacensis o Caiatinus

- Nicola Comparone (10 Dec 1990 - 5 Jan 1998)
- Pietro Farina (16 Feb 1999 -2009)
- Valentino Di Cerbo (6 Mar 2010 - )

== Bibliography ==
=== Reference works ===
- Gams, Pius Bonifatius (1873). Series episcoporum Ecclesiae catholicae: quotquot innotuerunt a beato Petro apostolo. Ratisbon: Typis et Sumptibus Georgii Josephi Manz. p. 863-864.(Use with caution; obsolete)
- Eubel, Conradus, ed. (1913). Hierarchia catholica (in Latin). Vol. Tomus 1 (second ed.). Münster: Libreria Regensbergiana. (in Latin)
- Eubel, Conradus, ed. (1914). Hierarchia catholica (in Latin). Vol. Tomus 2 (second ed.). Münster: Libreria Regensbergiana.
- Gulik, Guilelmus (1923). Eubel, Conradus (ed.). Hierarchia catholica (in Latin). Vol. Tomus 3 (second ed.). Münster: Libreria Regensbergiana.
- Gauchat, Patritius (Patrice) (1935). Hierarchia catholica. Vol. Tomus IV (1592-1667). Münster: Libraria Regensbergiana.
- Ritzler, Remigius; Sefrin, Pirminus (1952). Hierarchia catholica medii et recentis aevi. Vol. Tomus V (1667-1730). Patavii: Messagero di S. Antonio.
- Ritzler, Remigius; Sefrin, Pirminus (1958). Hierarchia catholica medii et recentis aevi. Vol. Tomus VI (1730-1799). Patavii: Messagero di S. Antonio.
- Ritzler, Remigius; Sefrin, Pirminus (1968). Hierarchia Catholica medii et recentioris aevi (in Latin). Vol. VII (1800–1846). Monasterii: Libreria Regensburgiana.
- Remigius Ritzler; Pirminus Sefrin (1978). Hierarchia catholica Medii et recentioris aevi (in Latin). Vol. VIII (1846–1903). Il Messaggero di S. Antonio.
- Pięta, Zenon (2002). Hierarchia catholica medii et recentioris aevi (in Latin). Vol. IX (1903–1922). Padua: Messagero di San Antonio. ISBN 978-88-250-1000-8.

=== Studies ===
- Caiola, Maria C.; Di Lorenzo, Pietro; Sparano, Gianrufo (2007). "La diocesi di Caiazzo: storia in età tardo medievale e moderna, arte, cronotassi vescovile e bibliografia di riferimento", in Rivista di Terra di Lavoro - Bollettino on-line dell'Archivio di Stato di Caserta, II, no. 3, pp. 46–62. (in Italian)
- Campagna, Angelo (1986). La chiesa di Cristo in Alife e Caiazzo. Piedimonte Matese: Tip. La Bodoniana, 1986. (in Italian)
- Cappelletti, Giuseppe (1866). Le chiese d'Italia: dalla loro origine sino ai nostri giorni : opera (in Italian). Vol. vigesmo (20). Venice: G. Antonelli. pp. 261–277.
- Collezione degli atti emanati dopo la pubblicazione del Concordato dell'anno 1818: contenente i brevi e le lettere apostoliche, i reali decreti e rescritti, le circolari ed istruzioni pubblicate da aprile 1840 a tutto dicembre 1841; non che una copiosa appendice a' precedenti volumi. 9 (in Italian and Latin). Vol. Parte nona (9). Napoli: Stamperia dell'Iride. 1842.
- D'Avino, Vincenzo (1848). Cenni storici sulle chiese arcivescovili, vescovili e prelatizie (nullius) del Regno delle Due Sicilie, Napoli 1848, pp. 147–149.
- Di Dario, B. (1941). Notizie storiche della Città e Diocesi di Caiazzo. Napoli: Lanciano. (in Italian)
- Esposito, Laura (2005). Le pergamene dell'archivio vescovile di Caiazzo (1266-1285). Volume II. Napoli 2005 («Archivio di Stato di Napoli. Diocesi Alife-Caiazzo») (in Italian)
- Esposito, Laura (2009). Le pergamene dell'archivio vescovile di Caiazzo (1286-1309). Volume IV. Napoli: Aret tipografica 2009 («Archivio di Stato di Napoli. Diocesi Alife-Caiazzo») (in Italian)
- Kamp, Norbert (1973). Kirche und Monarchie im staufischen Königreich Sizilien. Prosopographische Grundlegung. Bistümer und Bischöfe des Königreichs 1194-1266. 1. Abruzzen und Kampanien, Munich 1973. (in German)
- Kehr, Paul Fridolin (1925). Italia pontificia Vol. VIII (Berlin: Weidmann 1925), pp. 271–275. (in Latin)
- Salvati, Catello (1983). Le Pergamene dell'Archivio Vescovile di Caiazzo (1007-1265) (in Italian). Caserta: Società di storia patria di terra di lavoro.
- Ughelli, Ferdinando; Coleti, Niccolo (1720). Italia sacra sive De episcopis Italiæ, et insularum adjacentium (in Latin). Vol. Tomus sextus (6). Venice: apud Sebastianum Coleti. pp. 438–460.
