= Archbishopric of Nazareth =

Coordinates: 32.7000°N 35.3000°E

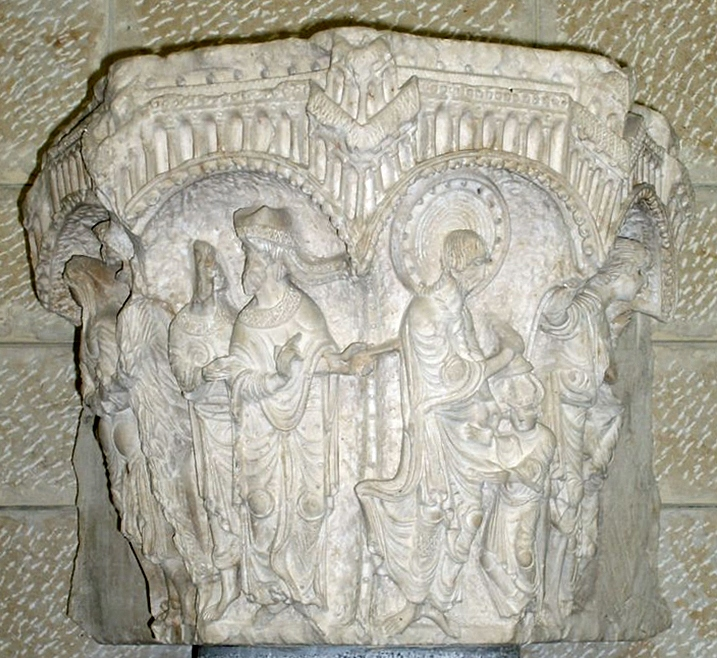

The Archdiocese of Nazareth is a former residential metropolitan see, first in the Holy Land, then in Apulian exile in Barletta (southern Italy), which had a Latin and a Maronite successor as titular sees, the first merged into Barletta, the second suppressed.

== History ==
Biblical Nazareth was one of the major sees of the Latin Patriarchate of Jerusalem during the crusades. After capturing Nazareth, the leaders of the First Crusade moved there the Metropolitan see of Scythopolis, while the Greek Orthodox continued to maintain two separate dioceses.

Nazareth thus became a Latin Church metropolitan archdiocese circa 1100. Among the archbishop's suffragans were the bishop of Tiberias and the abbot of Mount Tabor.

Following the Muslim conquest in the Holy Land, the archbishops of Nazareth took refuge in Barletta (Apulia, southern Italy), and moved permanently there in 1327. It began the long line of metropolitan archbishops of Nazareth residing in Barletta, which was called the see of Nazareth in Barletta.

On June 27, 1818, with the papal bull De ulteriori of Pope Pius VII, the Archdiocese of Nazareth was suppressed.

On 22 October 1828, with the bull Multis quidem of Pope Leo XII, the title of archbishop of Nazareth was granted to the archbishops of Trani.

By mergers, the title passed again to the restyled archbishops of Trani-Barletta (1860) and then to the archbishops of Trani-Barletta-Bisceglie (1986).

== Metropolitan archbishops of and in Nazareth ==
(all Roman Rite)

- Bernard (c. 1120), titled bishop
- William I (1129–1138)
- Robert I (1138–1153)
- Letard I, also known as Attard (1154–1158)
- Letard II (1158–1190)
- Albert (fl. 1206)
- Robert II (fl. 1210-1217)
- Hugh (c. 1210–1237)
- Henry (c. 1238-1268)
- Guy (c. 1268–1288)
- William of St. John (1288–1290)
- Peter (1290–1326)

== Metropolitan Archbishops of Nazareth in Barletta ==
(all Roman Rite)

Metropolitan Archbishops of Nazareth in Barletta

- Yvo (1327–1330)
- Pietro of Naples, Dominican Order (O.P.) † (1330–1345)
- Durando, Carmelite Order (O.Carm.) (1345–1348)
- Riccardo, O.F.M. (1348–1366)
- Guglielmo Belvaysius, O.P. (1366–1369)
- Giovanni Salomoni, O.P. (1369–1380)
- Giordano Estublans, O.P. (1381–?)
- Giovanni Alessio (1390–1400)
- Paolo di Arezzo, Friars Minor (O.F.M.) (1400–1431)
- Agostino Favaroni, Augustinian Order (O.E.S.A.) (1431–1443)
- Marino Orsini (1445–?)

Metropolitan Archbishops of Nazareth in Barletta-Cann(a)e, having absorbed the title of Bishop of Cannae

- Giacomo de Aurilia, O.F.M. (1455–1483)
- Giovanni de Barthon, (1483–1491)
- Giovanni Maria Poderico (1491–1510)
- Orlando Carretto Della Rovere (1510–1512)
- Giorgio Benigno Salviati, O.F.M. (1513–1520)
- Leonardo Baccuto (1520–1525)
- Pietro De Albis (1525–1526)
  - Apostolic administrator Ercole Rangone (1526), while **
- Pietro Francesco Ferro (1526)
- Giovanni Francesco Cina (1527)
- Filippo Adimari (1528–1536)

Metropolitan Archbishops of Nazareth in Barletta-Canne-Monteverde

- Gerolamo de Caro (1536–1552)
- Bernardino Figueroa (1553–1571)
- Fabio Mirto Frangipani (1572–1587)
- Francesco Spera, Order of Friars Minor (O.F.M.) (1587)
- Girolamo Bevilacqua, O.F.M. (1587–1604)
- Maffeo Barberini (1604–1608), elected pope Urban VIII)
- Michelangelo Tonti (1608–1609)
- Domenico Rivarola (1609–1627)
- Antonio Lombardi (1627–1636)
- Antonio Severoli (1639–1666)
- Francesco Antonio De Luca (1667–1676)
- Marziale Pellegrini, Conventual Franciscans (O.F.M. Conv.) (1677–1685)
- Filippo Condulmari (1685–1688)
- Giuseppe Rosa (1690–1694)
- Domenico Folgori (1695–1706)
- Giulio Piazza (1706–1710)
- Girolamo Mattei (1710–1712)
- Salvatore Miroballo (1717–1726)
- Giovanni Crisostomo Bianchi, O.E.S.A. (1726)
- Nicola Iorio (1726–1744)
- Antonio Marulli De Galiberti (1745–1751)
- Giusto De Marco, (C.R.) (1751–1769)
- Pasquale Maria Mastrillo, C.R. (1769–1783)
- Giuseppe Mormile, C.R. (1792–1801).

== Titular successor sees ==
=== Latin Titular Archbishopric of Nazareth ===
(all Roman Rite)

On 21 April 1860, the archdiocese was nominally restored as Metropolitan Titular archbishopric of Nazareth.

In 1925 it was suppressed, only to be restored in 1929 and finally united with (i.e. merged into) the residential Metropolitan Archdiocese of Trani–Barletta–Bisceglie, also territorial heir to the former Apulian see in exile.

It has had the following archiepiscopal incumbents, apparently all of the highest (Metropolitan) rank :

- Giuseppe de' Bianchi Dottula (1860.04.21 – 1892.09.22)
- Domenico Marinangeli (1893.01.16 – 1898.01.08), as former Bishop of Foggia (Italy) (1882.03.27 – 1893.01.16) and Metropolitan Archbishop of Trani e Barletta (Italy) (1893.01.16 – 1898.01.08), later Latin Titular Patriarch of Alexandria (1898.01.08 – 1921.03.06)
- Tommaso de Stefano (1898.03.24 – 1906.05.19)
- Francesco Paolo Carrano (1906.09.01 – 1915.03.18)
- Giovanni Régine (1915.12.06 – 1918.10.04)
- Giuseppe Maria Leo (1920.01.17 – 1925)
- Paul Auad (1941.06.14 – 1944.06.28)
- Reginaldo Giuseppe Maria Addazi, Dominican Order (O.P.) (1947.11.10 – 1971.07.03)
- Giuseppe Carata (1971.08.28 – 1989).

=== Maronite Titular (Arch)Bishopric of Nazareth ===
(Antiochian Rite)

It was established in the late 19th century as a Titular bishopric of the lowest (episcopal) rank, but suppressed in 1911, having had a single incumbent :

- Titular Bishop Youhanna Habib (1889 – 1894.06.04).

In 1926 it was restored, now as a Titular archbishopric of the intermediate (non-Metropolitan) rank. In 1939 it was again suppressed, having had the following incumbents :

- Titular Archbishop Paul Auad (1896.09.24 – 1911.02.11)
- Titular Archbishop Elias Richa (1926.06.21 – 1937.10.10).

== See also ==
- List of Catholic dioceses in Holy land and Cyprus
- List of Catholic dioceses in Italy
- Lordship of Nazareth, feudal territory in the crusader Kingdom of Jerusalem
- Roman Catholic Diocese of Bethléem à Clamecy, fellow crusader bishopric in (French) exile

== Sources and external links ==
- GCatholic, Latin former sees and former titular see, with incumbent biography links
- GCatholic, Maronite titular see, with incumbent biography links
- Scythopolis (Titular See) from Catholic-Hierarchy.org
- Scythopolis from the Catholic Encyclopedia
