= Armando Dini =

Italian Roman Catholic prelate (born 1932)

Most Reverend Armando Dini
- Archbishop emeritus of Campobasso-Boiano
- Church: Catholic Church
- Archdiocese: Campobasso-Boiano
- Installed: 21 November 1998
- Term ended: 8 November 2007
- Predecessor: Ettore Di Filippo
- Successor: Giancarlo Maria Bregantini
- Other posts: Bishop of Avezzano (1990–1998); Apostolic Administrator of Isernia-Venafro (2006–2007)

Orders
- Ordination: 5 December 1954 by Marcello Mimmi
- Consecration: 9 September 1990 by Michele Giordano

Personal details
- Born: 18 July 1932 (age 93) Milan, Kingdom of Italy
- Denomination: Catholic
- Motto: Omnes vos fratres estis
- Coat of arms

Armando Dini (born 18 July 1932) is an Italian Roman Catholic prelate, who served as an archbishop of the Campobasso-Boiano from 1998 until 2007.

== Early life and ministry ==
Armando Dini was born in Milan on 18 July 1932. He completed his ecclesiastical studies and was ordained a priest for the Archdiocese of Naples on 5 December 1954 by Cardinal Marcello Mimmi.

From 1968 to 1978, he served as a missionary in Venezuela. Following his return to Italy, he held various pastoral roles before his elevation to the episcopate.

== Episcopal career ==
On 23 June 1990, Pope John Paul II appointed him as the Bishop of Avezzano (also known as the Diocese of the Marsi). He received his episcopal consecration on 9 September 1990 from Cardinal Michele Giordano, with Archbishop Luigi Diligenza and Bishop Antonio Pagano serving as co-consecrators.

On 21 November 1998, he was promoted to the Metropolitan See of Campobasso-Boiano, succeeding Ettore Di Filippo. While serving as Archbishop, he was also appointed as the Apostolic Administrator of the Diocese of Isernia-Venafro on 5 August 2006, a position he held until 24 June 2007.

== Retirement ==
Upon reaching the mandatory retirement age of 75, he submitted his resignation to the Holy See. Pope Benedict XVI accepted his resignation on 8 November 2007. Since his retirement, he has resided in the Diocese of Avezzano, where he celebrated his 90th birthday in 2022.
