= Horatius Acquaviva d'Aragona =

Bishop of Caiazzo

Most Reverend Horatius Acquaviva d'Aragona
- Bishop of Caiazzo
- Church: Catholic Church
- Diocese: Diocese of Caiazzo
- In office: 1592–1617
- Predecessor: Ottavio Mirto Frangipani
- Successor: Paolo Filomarino

Personal details
- Died: 13 June 1617 Caiazzo, Italy

Horatius Acquaviva d'Aragona (died 13 June 1617) was a Roman Catholic prelate who served as Bishop of Caiazzo (1592–1617).

== Biography ==
Horatius Acquaviva d'Aragona was ordained a priest in the Cistercian Order. On 19 June 1592, he was appointed during the papacy of Pope Clement VIII as Bishop of Caiazzo. He served as Bishop of Caiazzo until his death on 13 June 1617.

== External links and additional sources ==
- Cheney, David M. "Diocese of Caiazzo". Catholic-Hierarchy.org. (for Chronology of Bishops) ^{[self-published]}
- Chow, Gabriel. "Diocese of Caiazzo (Italy)". GCatholic.org. (for Chronology of Bishops) ^{[self-published]}

Catholic Church titles
Preceded by Ottavio Mirto Frangipani	Bishop of Caiazzo; 1592–1617	Succeeded by Paolo Filomarino
