= Petronio Veroni =

Italian Roman Catholic prelate

Most Reverend Petronio Veroni
- Bishop of Boiano
- Church: Catholic Church
- Diocese: Diocese of Boiano
- In office: 1652–1653
- Predecessor: Filippo Benedetto de Sio
- Successor: Celestino Bruni

Orders
- Consecration: 2 October 1633 by Giovanni Battista Pamphili

Personal details
- Born: 2 October 1600 Bologna, Italy
- Died: 11 May 1653 (aged 52) Boiano, Italy

Petronio Veroni (2 October 1600 – 11 May 1653) was a Roman Catholic prelate who served as Bishop of Boiano (1652–1653).

== Biography ==
Petronio Veroni was born in Bologna, Italy and ordained a priest in the Order of Saint Augustine. On 8 January 1652, he was appointed by Pope Innocent X as Bishop of Boiano. On 21 January 1652, he was consecrated bishop by Niccolò Albergati-Ludovisi, Cardinal-Priest of Santa Maria degli Angeli, with Raffaele Pizzorno, Bishop of Sagone, and Giambattista Zeccadoro, Bishop of Fossombrone as co-consecrators. He served as Bishop of Boiano until his death on 11 May 1653.

== External links and additional sources ==
- Cheney, David M. "Archdiocese of Campobasso–Boiano". Catholic-Hierarchy.org. (for Chronology of Bishops) ^{[self-published]}
- Chow, Gabriel. "Metropolitan Archdiocese of Campobasso–Boiano (Italy)". GCatholic.org. (for Chronology of Bishops) ^{[self-published]}

Catholic Church titles
Preceded by Filippo Benedetto de Sio	Bishop of Boiano; 1652–1653	Succeeded by Celestino Bruni
