= Francesco Gozzadini =

Italian Roman Catholic prelate

Most Reverend Francesco Gozzadini
- Bishop of Cefalonia e Zante
- Church: Catholic Church
- Diocese: Diocese of Cefalonia e Zante
- In office: 1654–1673
- Predecessor: Giovanni de Rossi
- Successor: Giacinto Maria Conigli

Orders
- Consecration: 22 Mar 1654 by Marcantonio Franciotti

Personal details
- Died: 16 February 1673

Francesco Gozzadini (died 1673) was a Roman Catholic prelate who served as Bishop of Cefalonia e Zante (1654–1673).

== Biography ==
On 2 Mar 1654, Francesco Gozzadini was appointed during the papacy of Pope Innocent X as Bishop of Cefalonia e Zante. On 22 Mar 1654, he was consecrated bishop by Marcantonio Franciotti, Cardinal-Priest of Santa Maria della Pace, with Giovanni Alfonso Puccinelli, Archbishop of Manfredonia, and Thomas Tomassoni, Bishop of Umbriatico, serving as co-consecrators. He served as Bishop of Cefalonia e Zante until his death on 16 Feb 1673.

Catholic Church titles
Preceded by Giovanni de Rossi	Bishop of Cefalonia e Zante; 1654–1673	Succeeded by Giacinto Maria Conigli
