= Giovanni de Rossi (bishop) =

Roman Catholic prelate

Most Reverend Bishop Giovanni de Rossi
- Bishop of Ossero
- Church: Catholic Church
- Diocese: Diocese of Ossero
- In office: 1653–1667
- Predecessor: Marc'Antonio Verità
- Successor: Matthieu Scrivanelli
- Previous posts: Bishop of Cefalonia e Zante (1640–1645); Bishop of Chiron (1645–1653)

Orders
- Consecration: 9 December 1640 by Giulio Cesare Sacchetti

Personal details
- Died: 1667 Osor, Croatia

Giovanni de Rossi (died 1667) was a Roman Catholic prelate who served as Bishop of Ossero (1653–1667), Bishop of Chiron (1645–1653), and Bishop of Cefalonia e Zante (1640–1645).

== Biography ==
On 3 December 1640, Giovanni de Rossi was appointed during the papacy of Pope Urban VIII as Bishop of Cefalonia e Zante. On 9 December 1640, he was consecrated bishop by Giulio Cesare Sacchetti, Cardinal-Priest of Santa Susanna, with Leonardo Mocenigo, Archbishop of Candia, and Lelio Falconieri, Titular Archbishop of Thebae, serving as co-consecrators. On 10 July 1645, he was appointed during the papacy of Pope Innocent X as Bishop of Chiron. On 10 November 1653, he was appointed during the papacy of Pope Innocent X as Bishop of Ossero. He served as Bishop of Ossero until his death in 1667.

Catholic Church titles
Preceded by Costantino de Rossi	Bishop of Cefalonia e Zante; 1640–1645	Succeeded by Francesco Gozzadini
Preceded by Pietro Colletti	Bishop of Chiron; 1645–1653	Succeeded by
Preceded by Marc'Antonio Verità	Bishop of Ossero; 1653–1667	Succeeded by Matthieu Scrivanelli
