= Giacomo Villani =

Catholic Bishop

Most Reverend Giacomo Villani
- Church: Catholic Church
- Diocese: Diocese of Caiazzo
- In office: 1679–1690
- Predecessor: Giuseppe Petagna
- Successor: Francesco Giambattista Bonesana

Orders
- Consecration: 30 November 1679 by Alessandro Crescenzi (cardinal)

Personal details
- Born: 1605 Fossoli di Ravenna, Italy
- Died: 5 November 1690 (aged 84–85) Caiazzo, Italy

Giacomo Villani (1605 – 5 November 1690) was a Roman Catholic prelate who served as Bishop of Caiazzo (1679–1690).

== Biography ==
Giacomo Villani was born in Fossoli di Ravenna, Italy in 1605. On 27 November 1679, he was appointed by Pope Innocent XI as Bishop of Caiazzo. On 30 November 1679, he was consecrated bishop by Cardinal Alessandro Crescenzi, Bishop of Recanati e Loreto, with Prospero Bottini, Titular Archbishop of Myra, and Pier Antonio Capobianco, Bishop Emeritus of Lacedonia serving as co-consecrators. He served as Bishop of Caiazzo until his death on 5 November 1690.

== External links and additional sources ==
- Cheney, David M. "Diocese of Caiazzo". Catholic-Hierarchy.org. (for Chronology of Bishops) ^{[self-published]}
- Chow, Gabriel. "Diocese of Caiazzo (Italy)". GCatholic.org. (for Chronology of Bishops) ^{[self-published]}

Catholic Church titles
Preceded by Giuseppe Petagna	Bishop of Caiazzo; 1679–1690	Succeeded by Francesco Giambattista Bonesana
