= Giacinto Maria Conigli =

Roman Catholic prelate

Most Reverend Giacinto Maria Conigli
- Bishop Emeritus of Cefalonia e Zante
- Church: Catholic Church
- Diocese: Diocese of Cefalonia e Zante
- In office: 1675–1704
- Predecessor: Francesco Gozzadini
- Successor: Epifanio Fanelli

Orders
- Consecration: 26 May 1675 by Pietro Francesco Orsini de Gravina

Personal details
- Born: 1621 Venice, Italy
- Died: 1704 (age 83)

Giacinto Maria Conigli, O.P. (1621–1704) was a Roman Catholic prelate who served as Bishop of Cefalonia e Zante (1675–1704).

== Biography ==
Giacinto Maria Conigli was born in Venice, Italy in 1621 and ordained a priest in the Order of Preachers. On 6 May 1675, he was appointed during the papacy of Pope Clement X as Bishop of Cefalonia e Zante. On 26 May 1675, he was consecrated bishop by Pietro Francesco Orsini de Gravina, Archbishop of Manfredonia, with Francesco Maria Vignola, Bishop of Minervino Murge, and Raffaele Riario Di Saono, Bishop of Montepeloso, serving as co-consecrators. He served as Bishop of Cefalonia e Zante until his resignation on 7 Oct 1694. He died in 1704.

Catholic Church titles
Preceded by Francesco Gozzadini	Bishop of Cefalonia e Zante; 1675–1704	Succeeded by Epifanio Fanelli
