= Francesco Spera =

Most Reverend Francesco Spera
- Titular Archbishop of Nazareth
- Church: Catholic Church
- In office: 1587
- Predecessor: Fabio Mirto Frangipani
- Successor: Girolamo Bevilacqua

Orders
- Consecration: 24 May 1587 by Decio Azzolini (seniore)

Personal details
- Died: 28 October 1587

Francesco Spera, O.F.M. (died 1587) was a Roman Catholic prelate who served as Titular Archbishop of Nazareth (1587).

== Biography ==
Francesco Spera was ordained a priest in the Order of Friars Minor. On 11 May 1587, he was appointed during the papacy of Pope Sixtus V as Titular Archbishop of Nazareth. On 24 May 1587, he was consecrated bishop by Decio Azzolini (seniore), Bishop of Cervia, with Francesco Carusi, Bishop of Valva e Sulmona, and Franciscus Panicarola, Titular Bishop of Chrysopolis in Arabia, serving as co-consecrators. He served as Titular Archbishop of Nazareth until his death on 28 October 1587.

== External links and additional sources ==
- Cheney, David M. "Nazareth (Titular See)". Catholic-Hierarchy.org. (for Chronology of Bishops) ^{[self-published]}
- Chow, Gabriel. "Titular Metropolitan See of Nazareth". GCatholic.org. (for Chronology of Bishops) ^{[self-published]}

Catholic Church titles
Preceded by Fabio Mirto Frangipani	Titular Archbishop of Nazareth; 1587	Succeeded by Girolamo Bevilacqua
