= Marco Fedele Gonzaga =

Most Reverend Marco Fedele Gonzaga
- Church: Roman Catholic Church
- Diocese: Diocese of Mantua
- In office: 1574–1583
- Predecessor: Gregorio Boldrini
- Successor: Alessandro Andreasi

Personal details
- Died: 8 September 1583 Mantua, Italy

Marco Fedele Gonzaga (died 8 September 1583) was a Roman Catholic prelate who served as Bishop of Mantua (1574–1583), and Bishop of Ossero (1550–1574).

== Biography ==
On 2 June 1550, Marco Fedele Gonzaga was appointed during the papacy of Pope Julius III as Bishop of Ossero. On 28 November 1574, he was appointed during the papacy of Pope Gregory XIII as Bishop of Mantova. He served as Bishop of Mantova until his death on 8 September 1583.

== External links and additional sources ==
- Cheney, David M. "Diocese of Mantova". Catholic-Hierarchy.org. (for Chronology of Bishops) ^{[self-published]}
- Chow, Gabriel. "Diocese of Mantova (Italy)". GCatholic.org. (for Chronology of Bishops) ^{[self-published]}

Catholic Church titles
Preceded by Juan Bautista Garzón	Bishop of Ossero; 1550–1574	Succeeded by Coriolani Garzadoro
Preceded by Gregorio Boldrini	Bishop of Mantua; 1574–1583	Succeeded by Alessandro Andreasi
