= Girolamo Bevilacqua =

Most Reverend Girolamo Bevilacqua
- Archbishop of Nazareth
- Church: Catholic Church
- In office: 1587–1604
- Predecessor: Francesco Spera
- Successor: Maffeo Barberini

Personal details
- Born: Spello, Italy
- Died: 4 September 1604

Girolamo Bevilacqua O.F.M. (died 1604) was a Roman Catholic prelate who served as Archbishop of Nazareth (1587–1604).

== Biography ==
Girolamo Bevilacqua was born in Spello, Italy and ordained a priest in the Order of Friars Minor. On 2 December 1587, he was appointed during the papacy of Pope Sixtus V as Archbishop of Nazareth. On 27 Dec 1587, he was consecrated bishop by Costanzo de Sarnano, Bishop of Vercelli. He served as Archbishop of Nazareth until his death on 4 September 1604.

While bishop, he was the principal co-consecrator of Fabio Biondi, Titular Patriarch of Jerusalem (1588); and Thomas Cammerota, Bishop of Vieste (1589).

== See also ==
- Catholic Church in Italy

== External links and additional sources ==
- Cheney, David M. "Nazareth (Titular See)". Catholic-Hierarchy.org. (for Chronology of Bishops) ^{[self-published]}
- Chow, Gabriel. "Titular Metropolitan See of Nazareth". GCatholic.org. (for Chronology of Bishops) ^{[self-published]}

Catholic Church titles
Preceded by Francesco Spera	Archbishop of Nazareth; 1587–1604	Succeeded by Maffeo Barberini
