= Ottaviano Garzadori =

Italian Roman Catholic bishop (c. 1570–1653)

Most Reverend Ottaviano Garzadori
- Archbishop of Zadar
- Church: Catholic Church
- Archdiocese: Archdiocese of Zadar
- In office: 1624–1639
- Predecessor: Luca Stella
- Successor: Benedetto Cappello
- Previous post: Bishop of Boiano (1622–1624)

Orders
- Consecration: 22 January 1623 by Marco Antonio Gozzadini

Personal details
- Born: 1567 Vicenza, Italy
- Died: 1653 (aged 85–86)

Ottaviano Garzadori (or Garzadoro; ca. 1570–1653) was a Roman Catholic prelate who served as Archbishop of Zadar (1624–1639) and Bishop of Boiano (1622–1624).

== Biography ==
Ottaviano Garzadori was born in 1567 in Vicenza, Italy.

On 17 March 1614, he was appointed during the papacy of Pope Paul V as Bishop of Ossero. On 31 March 1614, he was consecrated bishop by Giovanni Garzia Mellini, Cardinal-Priest of Santi Quattro Coronati, with Coriolani Garzadoro, Bishop Emeritus of Ossero, and Marco Cornaro (bishop), Bishop of Padua, serving as co-consecrators. He served as Bishop of Ossero until 1620.<

On 19 December 1622, he was appointed by Pope Gregory XV as Bishop of Boiano.

On 22 January 1623, he was consecrated bishop by Marco Antonio Gozzadini, Cardinal-Priest of Sant’Eusebio with Alessandro Bosco, Bishop of Gerace, and Carlo Bovi, Bishop of Bagnoregio serving as co-consecrators. On 11 March 1624, he was appointed by Pope Urban VIII as Archbishop of Zadar. He served as Archbishop of Zadar until his resignation in January 1639.

== External links and additional sources ==
- Cheney, David M. "Archdiocese of Campobasso–Boiano". Catholic-Hierarchy.org. (for Chronology of Bishops) ^{[self-published]}
- Chow, Gabriel. "Metropolitan Archdiocese of Campobasso–Boiano (Italy)". GCatholic.org. (for Chronology of Bishops) ^{[self-published]}
- Cheney, David M. "Archdiocese of Zadar (Zara)". Catholic-Hierarchy.org. (for Chronology of Bishops) ^{[self-published]}
- Chow, Gabriel. "Archdiocese of Zadar (Croatia)". GCatholic.org. (for Chronology of Bishops) ^{[self-published]}

Catholic Church titles
Preceded by Coriolani Garzadoro	Bishop of Ossero; 1614–1620	Succeeded by Caesar Nardi
Preceded by Pietro Paolo Eustachi	Bishop of Boiano; 1613–1622	Succeeded by Fulgenzio Gallucci
Preceded by Luca Stella	Archbishop of Zadar; 1613–1622	Succeeded by Benedetto Cappello
