= Paolo Filomarino =

DhruvGalani

Most Reverend Paolo Filomarino
- Bishop of Caiazzo
- Church: Catholic Church
- Diocese: Diocese of Caiazzo
- In office: 1617–1623
- Predecessor: Horatius Acquaviva d'Aragona
- Successor: Filippo Benedetto de Sio

Orders
- Consecration: 24 September 1617 by Ladislao d'Aquino

Personal details
- Born: 1562 Naples, Italy
- Died: 27 May 1623 (age 61) Caiazzo, Italy

Paolo Filomarino, C.R. (1562 – 27 May 1623) was a Roman Catholic prelate who served as Bishop of Caiazzo (1617–1623).

== Biography ==
Paolo Filomarino was born in Naples, Italy in 1562 and ordained a priest in the Congregation of Clerics Regular of the Divine Providence. On 18 September 1617, he was appointed during the papacy of Pope Paul V as Bishop of Caiazzo. On 24 September 1617, he was consecrated bishop by Ladislao d'Aquino, Bishop of Venafro. He served as Bishop of Caiazzo until his death on 27 May 1623.

== External links and additional sources ==
- Cheney, David M. "Diocese of Caiazzo". Catholic-Hierarchy.org. (for Chronology of Bishops) ^{[self-published]}
- Chow, Gabriel. "Diocese of Caiazzo (Italy)". GCatholic.org. (for Chronology of Bishops) ^{[self-published]}

Catholic Church titles
Preceded by Horatius Acquaviva d'Aragona	Bishop of Caiazzo; 1617–1623	Succeeded by Filippo Benedetto de Sio
