= Diocese of Cephalonia and Zakynthos =

The Diocese of Cephalonia and Zakynthos (Latin: Dioecesis Cephaloniensis et Zacynthiensis, Italian: Cefalonia e Zante) was Roman Catholic diocese located on the Ionian Island of Cephalonia. It was suppressed in 1919.

== History ==
The Frankish Crusaders of the County palatine of Cephalonia and Zakynthos established the diocese, which survived their rule, in the early 13th century. On 3 June 1919 the residential see was suppressed but immediately transformed into a titular bishopric, its territory and title being merged into the Metropolitan Archdiocese of Corfu–Zakynthos–Cephalonia. In 1921 this was also suppressed, never having had an incumbent.

== Ordinaries ==
=== Diocese of Cephalonia ===
Erected: 13th Century
Latin Name: Cephaloniensis

- Benedetto (1207.03.23 – 1208)
- Giovanni di Stefano (? – 1252.06.13), later Bishop of Numana (1252.06.13 – 1254.02.09), Bishop of Cefalù (Italy) (1254.02.09 – 1269)
- Palmerio de Gallucio (1252.11.10 – ?)
- Enrico Padovano (1264 – 1273)
- Neruccio (? – death 1340)
- Niccolò (1341? – ?)
- Emmanuele, Benedictine Order (O.S.B.) (1350.06.14 – ?)
- Daniele (? – death 1370)
- Percivalle di Aleria (1370.03.06 – death 1375)
- Angelo di Crotone, Augustinian Order (O.E.S.A.) (1375.06.22 – death 1383)
- Princivalle (1385 – 1385)

=== Diocese of Cephalonia and Zakynthos ===
United: 1386
Latin Name: Cephaloniensis et Zacynthiensis
Metropolitan: Archdiocese of Corfu

- Biagio, O.E.S.A. (1385 – 1396.01.12), later Metropolitan Archbishop of Corinth (1396.01.12 – ?)
- Pietro Giovanni de Baraballis, Friars Minor (O.F.M.) (1396.01.12 – 1398), formerly Metropolitan Archbishop of Acerenza (Italy) (1392 – 1395.03.15), Archbishop of Matera (Italy) (1392 – 1395.03.15), Metropolitan Archbishop of Corinth (1395.03.15 – 1396.01.12)
- Pietro Giovanni, O.F.M. (1396.01.12 – 1398)
- Gregorio Nardi (1400.11.29 – 1427.10.15), later Bishop of Segni (Italy) (1427.10.15 – death 1429)
- Antonio Morelli (1427.10.17 – 1430), later Bishop of Trevico (Italy, 1431.12.20 – ?)
- Domenico de Pupio (1430.03.23 – death 1437)
- Giovanni de Pede (1437.02.25 – death 1443), previously Bishop of Ostuni (Italy) (1423 – 1437.02.25)
- Giovanni Giacomo, O.E.S.A. (1443.02.27 – ?)
- Giovanni di Arcadia (1458.01.31 – death 1463)
- Giovanni Antonio Scardemeto, O.F.M. (1463.10.23 – 1488)
- Marco de Franceschi (1488 – death 1521)
- Ferdinando de Medici (1521.08.09 – death 1550)
- Giovanni Francesco Commendone (1555.10.25 – 1560), later papal diplomat: Apostolic Nuncio to Poland (1563.09 – 1565.12), created Cardinal-Deacon of San Ciriaco alle Terme Diocleziane pro illa vice Deaconry (1566.11.15 – 1573?), promoted Cardinal-Priest of the same S. Ciriaco alle Terme Diocleziane (1573? – 1574.07.05), transferred Cardinal-Priest of Santa Maria degli Angeli (1574.07.05 – 1584.01.09), next Cardinal-Priest of S. Anastasia (1584.01.09 – 1584.05.14), finally Cardinal-Priest of San Marco (1584.05.14 – death 1584.12.26)
- Giovanni Pietro Dolfin, Canons Regular of Saint Augustine (C.R.S.A.) (1560.03.27 – 1574)
- Paolo Grassi, Canons Regular of the Lateran (C.R.L.) (1574.07.14 – death 1588)
- Domenico Carlo, Conventual Franciscans (O.F.M. Conv.) (1589.06.26 – 1595)
- Raffaele Inviziati (1597.01.24 – 1611)
- Marco Pasqualigo (1611.10.10 – death 1624)
- Giovanni Michele de Varolis, O.F.M. Conv. (1625.01.27 – 1634)
- Costantino de Rossi, Somascans (C.R.S.) (1634.06.24 – 1640.08.13), later Bishop of Krk (Croatia) (1640.08.13 – death 1653)
- Giovanni de Rossi (1640.12.03 – 1645.07.10), later Bishop of Chiron (1645.07.10 – 1653.11.10), Bishop of Osor (1653.11.10 – death 1667)
- Francesco Gozzadini (1654.03.02 – death 1673.02.16)
- Giacinto Maria Conigli, Dominican Order (O.P.) (1675.05.06 – 1694.10.07)
- Epifanio Fanelli, O.S.B. (1695.09.19 – 1697)
- José Sanz de Villaragut, O.F.M. (1696.06.18 – death 1698.08.29), previously Bishop of Gaeta (Italy) (1683.12.06 – 1693.01.02), Bishop of Pozzuoli (Italy) (1693.01.02 – 1696.06.18)
- Giovanni Vicenzo de Filippi, Servites (O.S.M.) (1698.12.10 – 1718.05.11), later Bishop of Caorle (1718.05.11 – death 1738.02.16)
- Giovanni Crisostomo Calvi, O.P. (1718.05.11 – 1729.09.07), later Bishop of Montefeltro (Italy) (1729.09.07 – death 1747.04.27)
- Giuseppe Caccia, O.F.M. (1729.11.28 – 1731.01.08), later Bishop of Traù (1731.01.08 – retired 1737.08.29)
- Cesare Bonajuti (1731.01.22 – 1736.02.27), later Bishop of Hvar (Croatia) (1736.02.27 – 1759)
- Baldassarre Maria Remondini (1736.02.27 – death 1777.10.05)
- Bernardo Bocchini, O.F.M. Cap. (1778.09.28 – death 1785.01.16)
- Francesco Mercati (1785.09.26 – death 1803)
- Aloisio Scacoz, O.F.M. (1815.08.08 – 1831.11.13), emeritate as Titular Archbishop of Stauropolis (1831.12.02 – death 1842.02.22)
- Luigi Lastaria (1831.11.04 – death 1870)
- Evangelista Boni, O.F.M. Cap. (1872.06.07 – 1885.01.11), later Bishop of Corfu (insular Greece) (1885.01.11 – death 1897.08.19)
- Dionisio Nicolosi (1885.05.05 – 1890.06.06), later Bishop of Chios (insular Greece) (1890.06.06 – death 1916.01.25)
- Apostolic Administrator Domenico Darmanin (1913 – 1919.02.17), while Bishop of Corfu (insular Greece) (1912.03.04 – 1919.02.17)
