= Coriolano Garzadori =

Roman Catholic prelate

Most Reverend Coriolano Garzadori
- Bishop of Ossero
- Church: Catholic Church
- Diocese: Diocese of Ossero
- In office: 1575–1614
- Predecessor: Marco Fedele Gonzaga
- Successor: Ottaviano Garzadori

Coriolano Garzadori (or Garzadoro) was a Roman Catholic prelate who served as Bishop of Ossero (1575–1614).

== Biography ==
On 19 January 1575, he was appointed during the papacy of Pope Gregory XIII as Bishop of Ossero. He served as Bishop of Ossero until his resignation in 1614. While bishop, he was the principal consecrator of Lothar von Metternich, Archbishop of Trier (1600) and Johann Nopel der Jüngere, Auxiliary Bishop of Cologne (1602); and the principal co-consecrator of Ludovico Sarego, Bishop of Adria (1612); Bartolomeo Cartolario, Bishop of Chioggia (1613); Andreas Corbelli, Bishop of Canea (1613); and Ottaviano Garzadori, Bishop of Ossero (1614).

Catholic Church titles
Preceded by Marco Fedele Gonzaga	Bishop of Ossero; 1575–1614	Succeeded by Ottaviano Garzadori
