= Fabio Mirto Frangipani =

Italian Roman Catholic prelate

Most Reverend Fabio Mirto Frangipani
- Titular Archbishop of Nazareth
- Church: Catholic Church
- Archdiocese: Titular Archdiocese of Nazareth
- In office: 1572–1587
- Predecessor: Bernardino Figueroa
- Successor: Francesco Spera

Personal details
- Died: 17 March 1587

Fabio Mirto Frangipani (died 17 March 1587) was a Roman Catholic prelate who served as Titular Archbishop of Nazareth (1572–1587) and Bishop of Caiazzo (1537–1572).

== Biography ==
On 10 July 1537, he was appointed during the papacy of Pope Paul III as Bishop of Caiazzo. On 5 November 1572, he resigned as Bishop of Caiazzo and was appointed during the papacy of Pope Gregory XIII as Titular Archbishop of Nazareth. He died on 17 March 1587.

== Episcopal succession ==
While bishop, he was the principal co-consecrator of:

- Fabio Capelleto, Bishop of Lacedonia (1555);
- Virgilio Rosario, Bishop of Ischia (1555);
- Mario Bolognini, Archbishop of Lanciano (1579); and
- Flaminio Filonardi, Bishop of Aquino (1579).

== External links and additional sources ==
- Cheney, David M. "Nazareth (Titular See)". Catholic-Hierarchy.org. (for Chronology of Bishops) ^{[self-published]}
- Chow, Gabriel. "Titular Metropolitan See of Nazareth". GCatholic.org. (for Chronology of Bishops) ^{[self-published]}
- Cheney, David M. "Diocese of Caiazzo". Catholic-Hierarchy.org. (for Chronology of Bishops) ^{[self-published]}
- Chow, Gabriel. "Diocese of Caiazzo (Italy)". GCatholic.org. (for Chronology of Bishops) ^{[self-published]}

Catholic Church titles
Preceded by Alexander Mirto Frangipani	Bishop of Caiazzo; 1537–1572	Succeeded by Ottavio Mirto Frangipani
Preceded by Bernardino Figueroa	Titular Archbishop of Nazareth; 1572–1587	Succeeded by Francesco Spera
