= Alexander Mirto Frangipani =

Most Reverend Alexander Mirto Frangipani
- Bishop of Caiazzo
- Church: Catholic Church
- Diocese: Diocese of Caiazzo
- In office: 1529–1537
- Predecessor: Antonio Maria Ciocchi del Monte
- Successor: Fabio Mirto Frangipani

Alexander Mirto Frangipani was a Roman Catholic prelate who served as Bishop of Caiazzo (1529–1537).

== Biography ==
On 28 Jun 1529, Alexander Mirto Frangipani was appointed during the papacy of Pope Clement VII as Bishop of Caiazzo. He served as Bishop of Caiazzo until his resignation on 10 Jul 1537.

== External links and additional sources ==
- Cheney, David M. "Diocese of Caiazzo". Catholic-Hierarchy.org. (for Chronology of Bishops) ^{[self-published]}
- Chow, Gabriel. "Diocese of Caiazzo (Italy)". GCatholic.org. (for Chronology of Bishops) ^{[self-published]}

Catholic Church titles
Preceded by Antonio Maria Ciocchi del Monte	Bishop of Caiazzo; 1529–1537	Succeeded by Fabio Mirto Frangipani
