= Osor, Croatia =

Village in Primorje-Gorski Kotar, Croatia

Osor
- Village
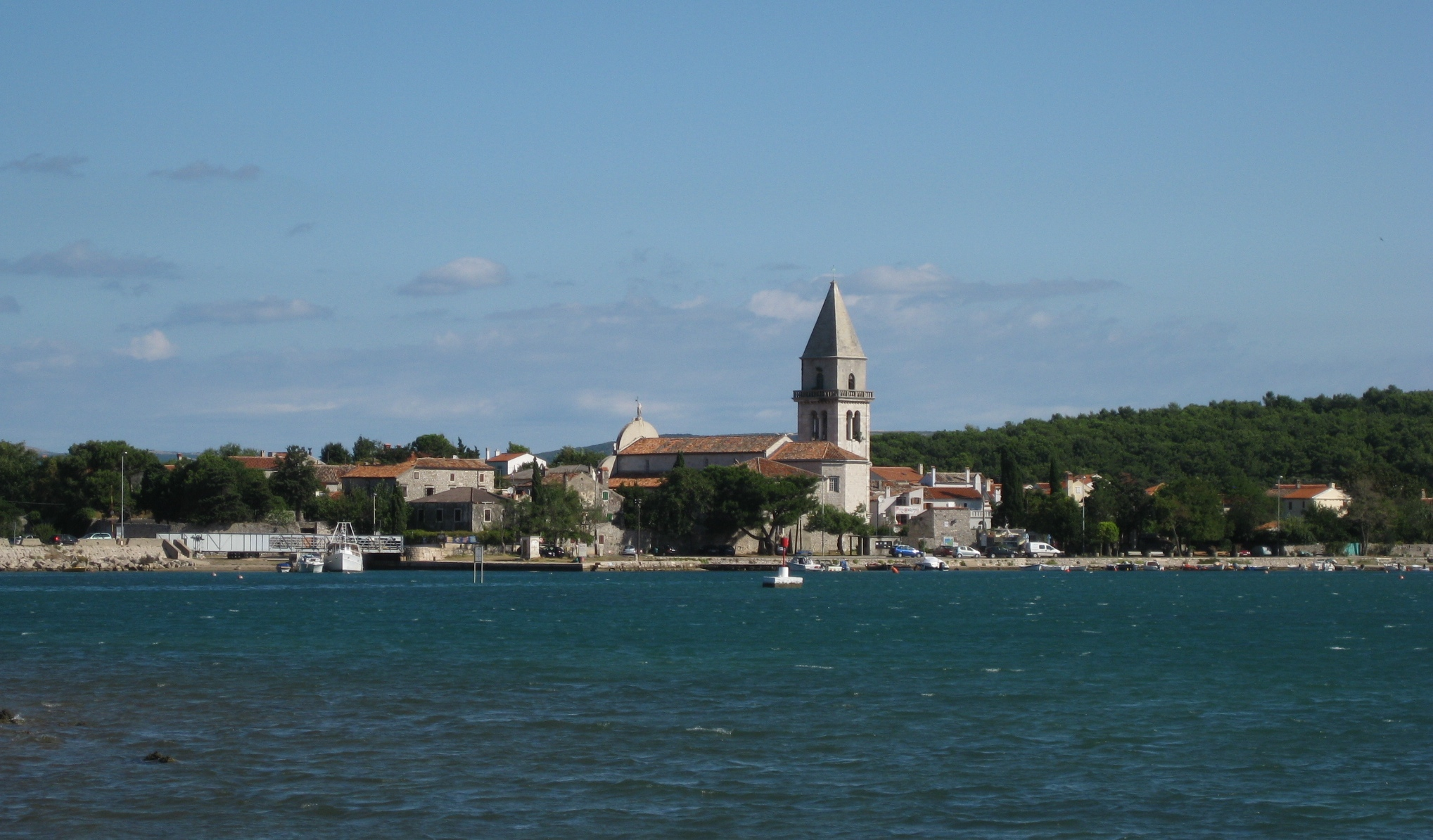
- View of Osor

- Location within Croatia
- Coordinates: 44.69390°N 14.39296°E
- Country: Croatia
- County: Primorje-Gorski Kotar
- Town: Mali Lošinj

Area
  - Total: 24.7 km^{2} (9.5 sq mi)

Population (2021)
  - Total: 26
  - Density: 1.1/km^{2} (2.7/sq mi)
- Time zone: UTC+1 (CET)
  - Summer (DST): UTC+2 (CEST)
- Postal code: 51554
- Area code: 051
- Vehicle registration: RI

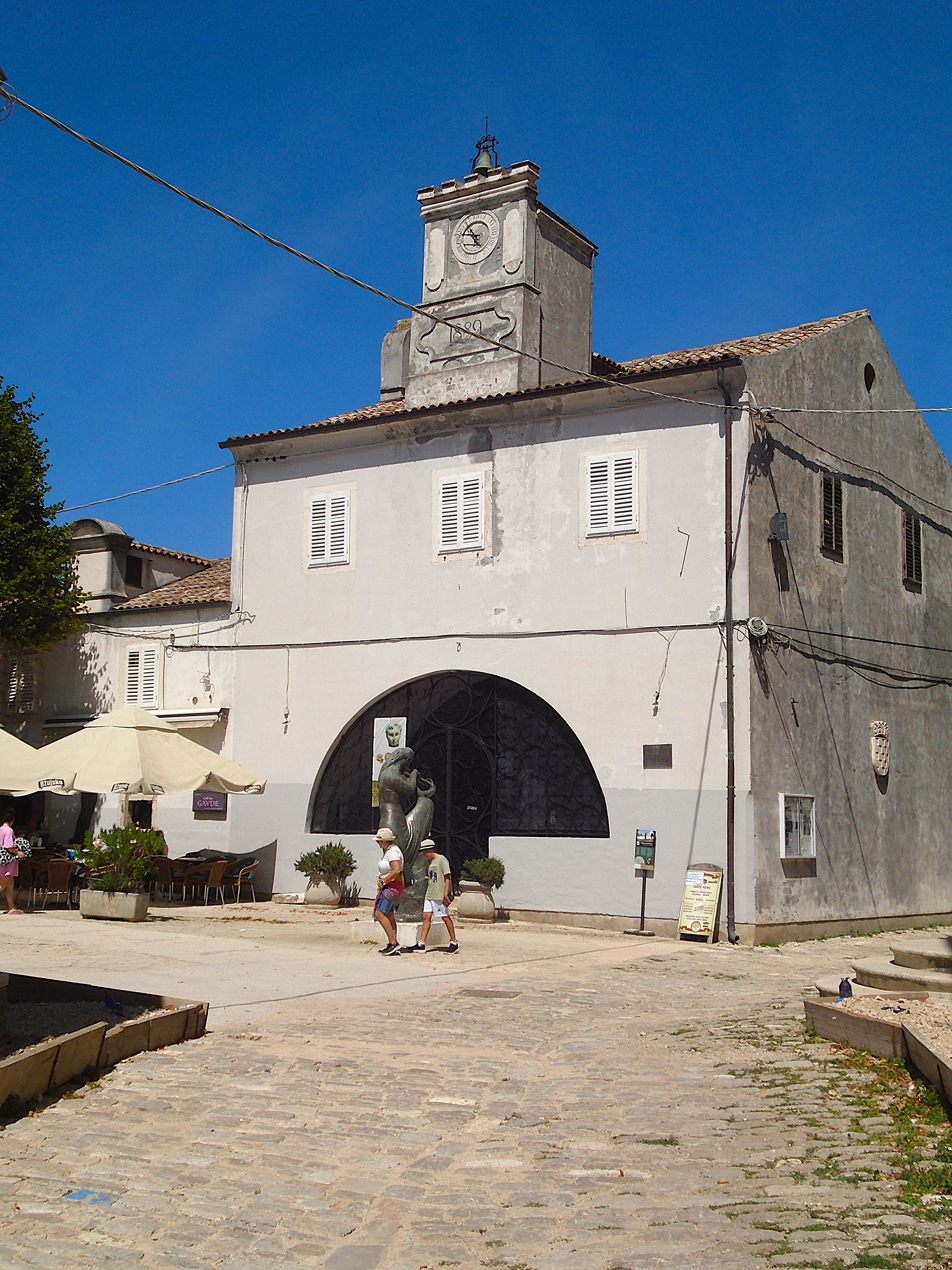
Centre of Osor

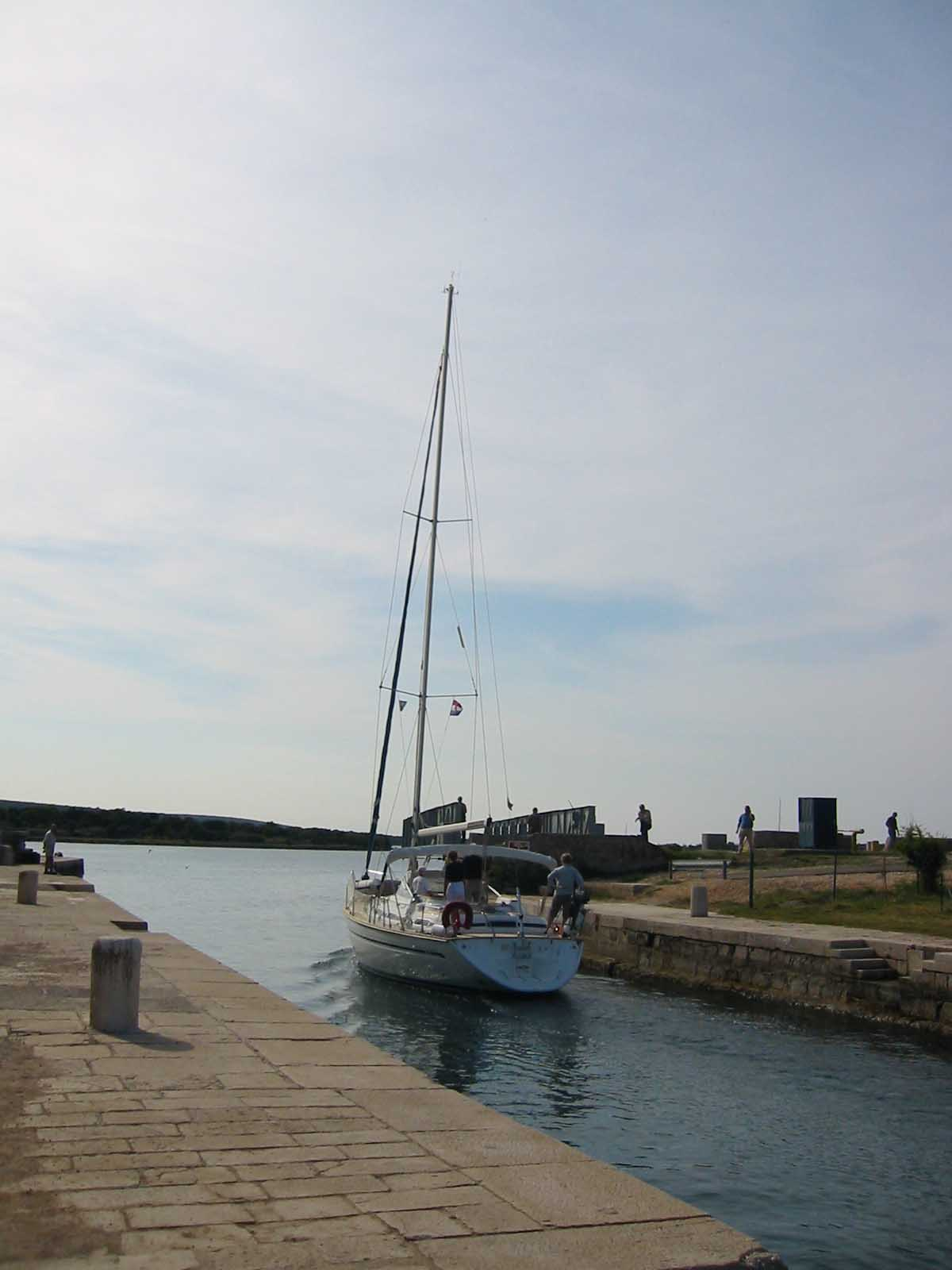
Osor channel between the islands Lošinj and Cres, Croatia

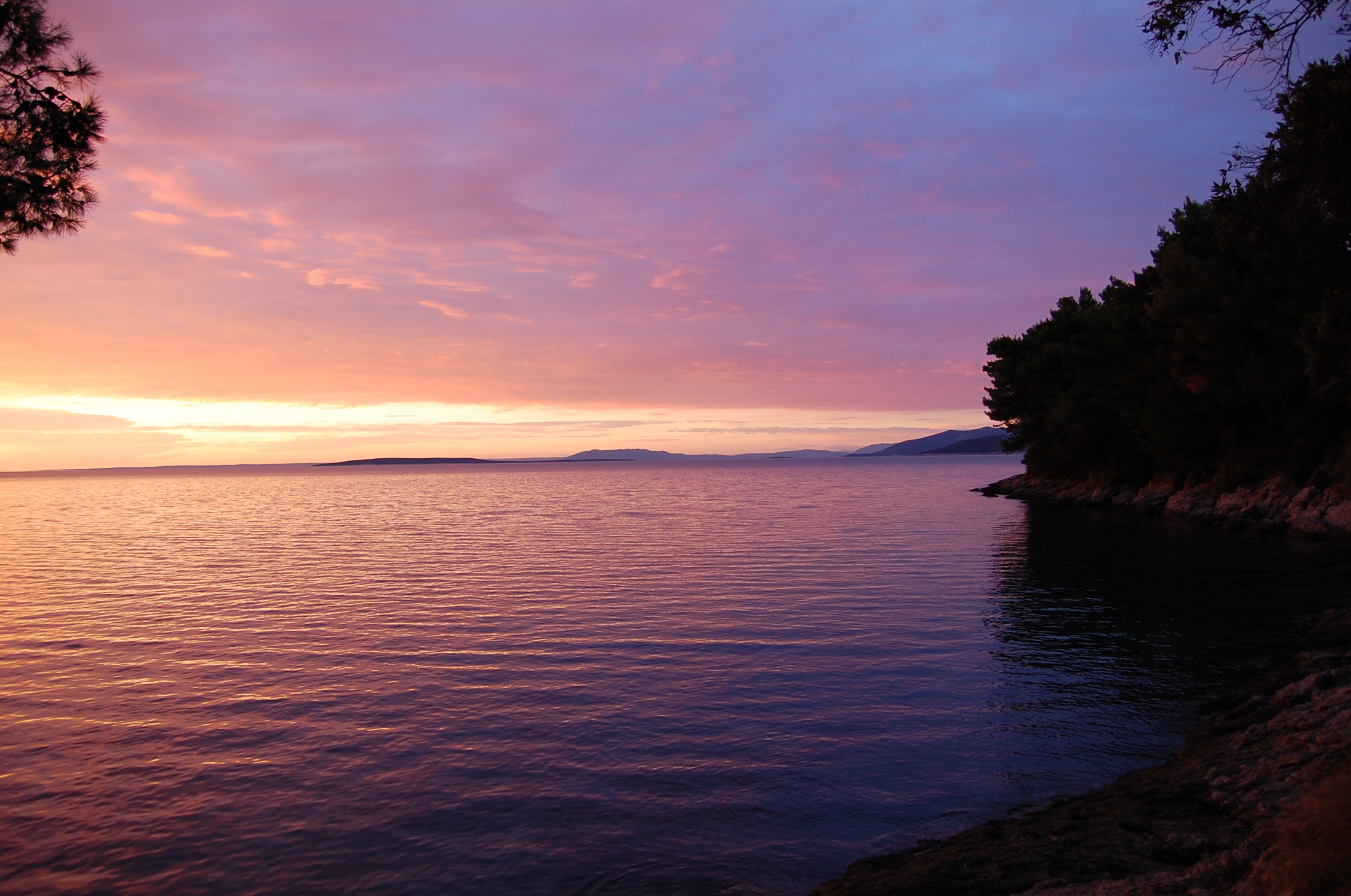
Sunset in Osor

Osor (Italian: Ossero) is a village and a small port on the Croatian island of Cres, in the Primorje-Gorski Kotar county. Administratively, it is part of the town of Mali Lošinj. As of 2021, it had a population of 26.

Osor lies at a narrow channel that separates islands of Cres and Lošinj. The channel was built in Roman times to make sailing through possible. Today, these islands are connected by a rotating bridge. Originally, before the channel was created, Cres and Lošinj had been one joint island (called Osor at the time).

== History ==
First settlements in the area were set up in prehistoric times. During Roman times, Osor, then called Apsoros (Ancient Greek: Ἄψωρος), also used to refer to the whole island of Lošinj, and was an important trade town on the route to the ports of Northern Adriatic. After the fall of the Roman Empire, Osor became a part of the Byzantine Empire.

In 840, it was burned down by the Saracens. In the 10th century, it came under the rule of Croats. During the 14th century, it was under the rule of the Republic of Venice. By the 15th century, Osor's strategic and commercial importance had diminished. Due to malaria, it was ultimately abandoned as the administrative center of the island in favor of the town of Cres.

In the 19th century, the island was under the rule of the Austro-Hungarian Empire. After the First World War, it was a part of the Kingdom of Italy. After the Second World War, Osor-Ossero became a part of the Socialist Republic of Croatia within Yugoslavia.

Today, Osor is a tourist-oriented town in Croatia, with sculptures by Ivan Meštrović and others scattered around the center. Several camping sites have been established in the area.

== Ecclesiastical history ==
=== Residential bishopric ===
The bishopric (at the time called Absorus) was founded circa 600, possibly even as early as the 6th century, as a suffragan of the Metropolitan Archbishop of the Late Roman province Dalmatia Inferior's capital Salona (later of Split). The first bishop of the see whose name is known was Dominicus, from the last third of the 9th century. It has also been called Absor and Lusin.

From 1146, the diocese was a suffragan of the Metropolitan Archdiocese of Zadar/Zara. Its cathedral, the Church of the Assumption, was built between 1463 and 1497. In 1621, the area was occupied by the Ottoman Empire but held only for a short time. During this period, Christians from the area traveled to Šibenik to fulfil their Easter duty of Confession and Communion.

In 1828, Absorus ceased to be a residential see and its territory was integrated to that of the Croatian diocese of Krk.

Suffragan Bishops of Osor

(all Roman Rite; very incomplete : first centuries unavailable)

- ...
- Lovro (1042? – 1059), later Metropolitan Archbishop of Salona (Croatia) (1059 – 1099)
- Michele, Friars Minor (O.F.M.) (1290? – ?)
- Giacomo (? – ?)
- Angelo, O.F.M. (2 October 1295 – 1300?)
- Bonifacio (1315? – ?)
- Guglielmo (1325? – ?)
- Cipriano (1335? – death 1337?)
- Crisogono (6 January 1343 – ?)
- Martino (8 March 1346 – ?)
- Matteo Cernota (29 October 1347 – 19 July 1357), later Bishop of Šibenik (Croatia) (1357.07.19 – ?)
- Bonifacio (19 July 1357 – ?), previously Bishop of Trebinje (Bosnia and Herzegovina) (? – 6 February 1344), Bishop of Šibenik (Croatia) (6 February 1344 – 19 July 1357)
- Michele da Zara, O.F.M. (17 June 1374 – ?)
- Tommaso (? – ?)
- Pactius (1390? – ?)
- Mauro Rassoli (17 May 1399 – death 1410?)
- Isidoro, Benedictine Order (O.S.B.) (19 November 1410 – 1411)
- Vito da Cherso, O.F.M. (24 October 1412 – ?)
- Pietro Leon (6 February 1436 – 4 June 1445), later Bishop of Ceneda (Italy) (4 June 1445 – 1474)
- Simone de Valle (9 June 1445 – ?), was an auditor in the case of John Myssenden Vicar of Leatherhead against the Priory of Leeds near Maidstone in 1446. The Register of Letters to England, Scotland and Ireland reports the case
- Domenico (28 July 1449 – ?)
- Antonio di Pago (12 January 1451 – 29 March 1471), later Bishop of Kotor (Montenegro) (29 March 1471 – ?)
- Marco Negro (29 March 1471 – death 20 July 1485), previously Bishop of Kotor (Montenegro) (7 November 1459 – 29 March 1471)
- Giovanni Robobello (5 November 1485 – 6 January 1491), later Bishop of Feltre (Italy) (6 January 1491 – 19 December 1494), Metropolitan Archbishop of Zadar (Zara) (Croatia) (19 December 1494 – 1503)
- Giovanni Giusto (6 January 1491 – ?)
- Andrea Corner (6 November 1512 – death 1514)
- Giovanni Battista Garzoni (1514 – death 1516)
- Andrea Peveraro (24 July 1517 – death 1527)
- Antonio de Cappo (26 December 1527 – death 1553)
- Marco Fedeli-Gonzaga (1553 – 1 December 1574), succeeding as former Coadjutor Bishop of Osor (? – 1553); later Bishop of Mantova (Mantua)) (Italy) (1 December 1574 – death 29 September 1583)
- Coriolano Garzadoro (19 January 1575 – 1614)
- Ottaviano Garzadoro (17 March 1614 – death 1633)
- Marc'Antonio Verità (18 July 1633 – death 15 October 1650)
- Giovanni de Rossi (10 November 1653 – death 1667), previously Bishop of Kefalonia–Zakynthos (insular Greece; 3 December 1640 – 10 July 1645), Bishop of Chiron (10 July 1645 – 10 November 1653)
- Matteo Scrivanelli (3 August 1667 – death December 1672)
- Simone Gaudenti (30 January 1673 – death September 1719)
- Nicolò Drasich (16 September 1720 – death December 1737)
- Giovanni Ferro (19 December 1738 – death 27 May 1742)
- Mate Karaman (9 July 1742 – 22 November 1745), later Metropolitan Archbishop of Zadar (Zara) (Croatia) (22 November 1745 – death 7 May 1771)
- Niccolò Dinarico (Dinarić) (22 November 1745 – 3 January 1757), later Metropolitan Archbishop of Salona (Croatia) (3 January 1757 – 1764)
- Bonaventura Bernardi (3 January 1757 – death 21 February 1781)
- Simone Spalatin (25 June 1781 – death 10 February 1798), previously Bishop of Korcula (13 March 1775 – 25 June 1781)
- Francesco Pietro Raccamarich (20 July 1801 – 21 January 1815), previously Bishop of Kotor (Montenegro) (27 June 1796 – death 20 July 1801)

=== Titular see ===
It is today listed by the Catholic Church as a since 1933, when the diocese was nominally restored as a titular bishopric Osor, also named Absorus in Latin and Ossore in Curiate Italian.

It has had the following incumbents of the fitting episcopal (lowest) rank :

- Titular Bishop Karl Moser (9 July 1969 – 29 September 1991), as Auxiliary Bishop of Wien (Vienna) (Austria) (9 July 1969 – 29 June 1991)
- Titular Bishop Peter Henrici (4 March 1993 – ...), Jesuits (S.J.), Auxiliary Bishop emeritus of Chur (Switzerland)

== Sources and external links ==
- GCatholic with incumbent bio links
