= Bojano =

- Comune
- Comune di Bojano
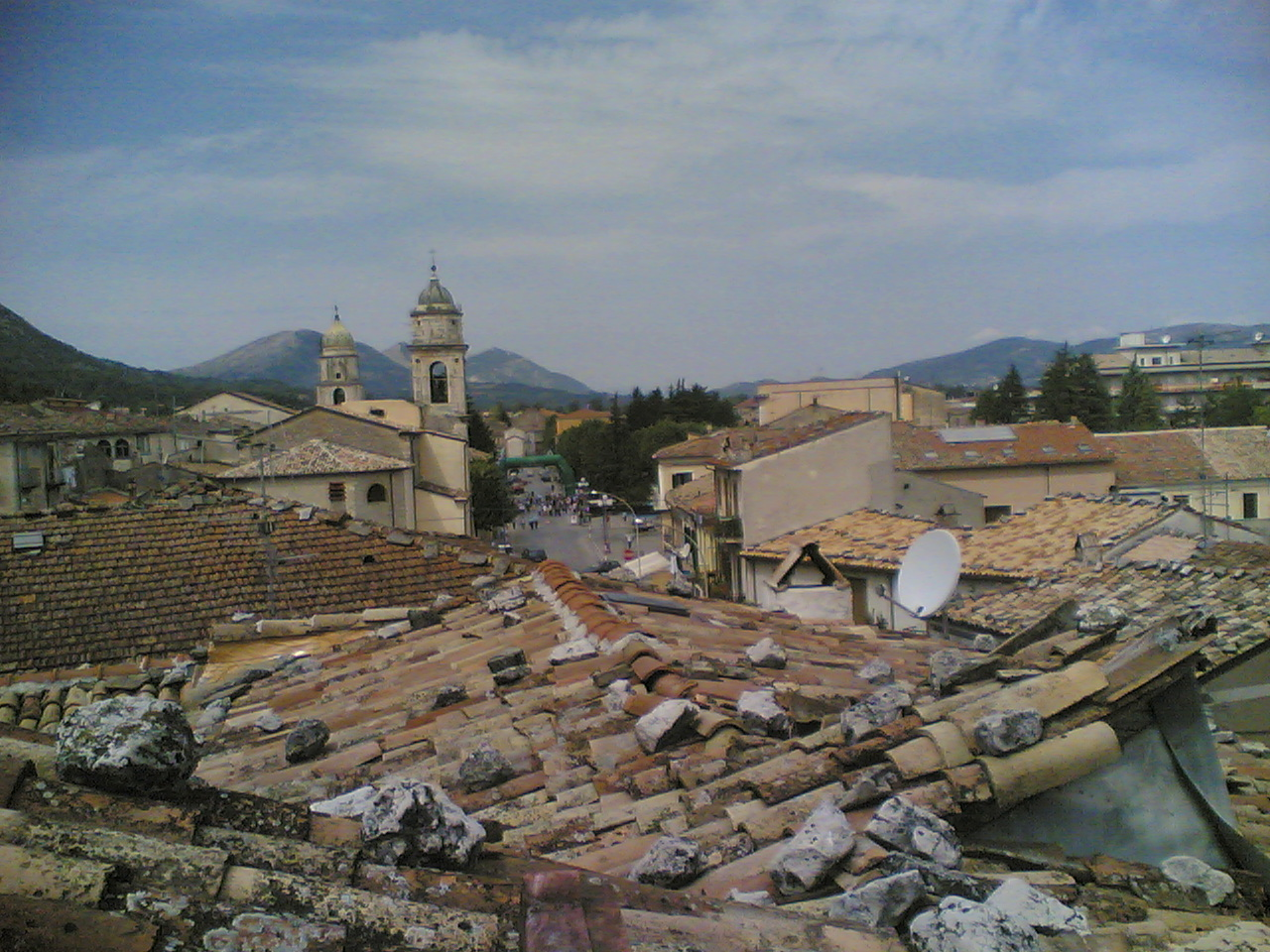
- View of Bojano

- Coat of arms

- Location within Italy Location within Molise
- Coordinates: 41°29′N 14°28′E
- Country: Italy
- Region: Molise
- Province: Campobasso (CB)
- Frazioni: see list

Government
  - Mayor: Carmine Ruscetta

Area
  - Total: 49 km^{2} (19 sq mi)
- Elevation: 480 m (1,570 ft)

Population (30 November 2017)
  - Total: 8,181
  - Density: 170/km^{2} (430/sq mi)
- Demonym: Bojanesi
- Time zone: UTC+1 (CET)
  - Summer (DST): UTC+2 (CEST)
- Postal code: 86021
- Dialing code: 0874
- Patron saint: St. Bartholomew
- Saint day: August 25
- Website: Official website

Bojano or Boiano is a town and comune in the province of Campobasso, Molise, southern Italy.

== History ==
Originally named Bovaianom, it was settled by the 7th century BC. As the capital of the Pentri, a tribe of the Samnites, it played a major role in the Samnite Wars, as well as in the Social War, when it was a temporary capital (89 BC). It was sacked by Sulla.

It was colonized under both the triumvirates, and by Vespasian, who settled veterans of Legio XI Claudia (whence the name Bovianum Undecumanorum, to distinguish it from Bovianum Vetus), and remained an important centre into late antiquity.

After the Lombard conquest, the deserted area was given to a group of Bulgars, who circa 662 fled from the Avars and sought refuge with the Lombards. Bojano became a seat of a gastaldate. The Bulgars also settled in nearby Sepino and Isernia. Paul the Deacon in his Historia Langobardorum writing after the year 787 says that in his time Bulgars still inhabited the area, and that even though they speak "Latin", "they have not forsaken the use of their own tongue". In later times they had evidently become completely assimilated.

After two centuries marked by Saracen attacks, in the mid-11th century Bojano was conquered by the Hauteville Normans, becoming a fief of Raoul de Moulins, a companion to Robert Guiscard. The city became a county capital.

The city was destroyed by a long series of earthquakes, the last occurring in 1913.

During the era of Fascist Italy, Bojano was the site of a small fascist internment camp administered and operated by the province of Campobasso. The camp was located in four warehouses that were once used for tobacco production by the Società Anonima Imprese Metropolitane (SAIM). Three of the warehouses were used for internment while the fourth was used to provide services. The camp could hold up to 250-300 people, but never held more than 100. The internees were said to have been Gypsies, Chinese, and "foreign Jews". Some time by July 1941, the camp had deteriorated and it was closed with the remaining prisoners (58 Gypsies) transferred to the camp at Agnone.

== Main sights ==
The remains of Cyclopean walls can be seen on the heights above the modern town. Other attractions include:

- Cathedral of San Bartolomeo, 11th century cathedral, rebuilt several times after earthquakes. The apse is still in Norman style.
- Church of Santa Maria del Parco, with a noteworthy Gothic portal.
- Church of San Biagio, the patron saint's day on February 3rd is very popular.
- Church of San Michele, 6th century church near Civita Superiore.
- Church of Sant'Emidio, in Monteverde.
- Church of Santa Maria delle Grazie, in Civita Superiore.
- Church of San Giovanni, in Civita Superiore.
- Church of Santa Maria della Libera, in Castellone.
- The Hermitage of St. Egidius, on a 1,025-metre-high (3,363 ft) mountain in the neighbourhood.
- The remains of the Norman Castle.

== Frazioni ==
Alifana, Campi Marzi, Castellone, Chiovitti, Ciccagne, Civita Superiore, Codacchio, Colacci, Collalto, Cucciolene, Fonte delle Felci, Imperato, Limpiilli, Majella, Malatesta, Monteverde, Mucciarone, Pallotta, Petrilli, Pietre Cadute, Pinciere, Pitoscia, Pitti, Prusciello, Rio Freddo, Santa Maria dei Rivoli, Sant'Antonio Abate, Taddeo, Tilli Tilli.

== Sources ==
- De Benedittis, G. (1977). Bovianum ed il suo territorio.
