= Carlo Conti (cardinal) =

Italian Roman Catholic cardinal

His Eminence Carlo Conti
- Cardinal-Priest of Santa Prisca; Bishop of Ancona e Numana
- Church: Catholic Church

Orders
- Consecration: 21 July 1585 by Giovanni Battista Castagna

Personal details
- Born: 28 August 1556 Rome, Italy
- Died: 3 December 1615 (age 59) Rome, Italy

Carlo Conti (1556–1615) was a Roman Catholic cardinal.

== Biography ==
On 21 July 1585, he was consecrated bishop by Giovanni Battista Castagna, Cardinal-Priest of San Marcello al Corso, with Filippo Sega, Bishop of Piacenza, and Vincenzo Casali, Bishop of Massa Marittima, serving as co-consecrators.

== Episcopal succession ==
While bishop, he was the principal consecrator of:

- Francesco Giustiniani, Bishop of Treviso (1605);
- Dionigi Morelli, Bishop of Ferentino (1605);
- Giovanni Linati, Bishop of Borgo San Donnino (1606);
- Alessandro Rossi, Bishop of Castro del Lazio (1611);
- Eleuterio Albergone, Bishop of Montemarano (1611);

and the principal co-consecrator of:

- Juan Esteban Ferrero, Bishop of Vercelli (1599);
- Ascanio Colonna, Cardinal-Bishop of Palestrina (1606);
- Marcello Lante della Rovere, Bishop of Todi (1607).

Catholic Church titles
| Preceded by Alessandro Farnese (iuniore) | Bishop of Ancona e Numana; 1585–1615 | Succeeded by Giulio Savelli |
| Preceded by Camillo Borghese | Cardinal-Priest of San Crisogono; 1605 | Succeeded by Scipione Caffarelli-Borghese |
| Preceded by Gian Francesco Biandrate di San Giorgio Aldobrandini | Cardinal-Priest of San Clemente; 1605–1613 | Succeeded by Jean de Bonsi |
| Preceded by Bonifazio Bevilacqua Aldobrandini | Cardinal-Priest of Santa Prisca; 1613–1615 | Succeeded by Tiberio Muti |
