= Galeazzo Sanvitale =

Roman Catholic prelate

Most Reverend Galeazzo Sanvitale
- Archbishop of Bari-Canosa
- Church: Catholic Church
- Archdiocese: Archdiocese of Bari-Canosa
- In office: 1604–1606
- Predecessor: Bonviso Bonvisi
- Successor: Decio Caracciolo Rosso

Orders
- Consecration: 4 April 1604 by Girolamo Bernerio

Personal details
- Died: 8 September 1622 Bari, Italy

Galeazzo Sanvitale (died 8 September 1622) was a Roman Catholic prelate who served as Archbishop of Bari-Canosa (1604–1606).

== Biography ==
Galeazzo Sanvitale was born in Parma, Italy in 1566. On 15 March 1604, he was appointed during the papacy of Pope Clement VIII as Archbishop of Bari-Canosa. On 4 April 1604, he was consecrated bishop in the chapel of the Apostolic Sacristy, Rome by Girolamo Bernerio, Cardinal-Bishop of Albano, with Claudio Rangoni, Bishop of Piacenza, and Giovanni Ambrogio Caccia, Bishop of Castro del Lazio, serving as co-consecrators. He served as Archbishop of Bari-Canosa until his resignation in 1606. He died on 8 September 1622.

== Episcopal succession ==
Episcopal succession of Galeazzo Sanvitale

While bishop, he was the principal consecrator of:

- Ludovico Ludovisi, Cardinal-Priest of Santa Maria in Traspontina (1621). Through Sanvitale's episcopal consecration of Ludovico Ludovisi, he is part of the episcopal lineage of Pope Francis and most other modern bishops.

He was also the principal co-consecrator of:

- Francesco Simonetta, Bishop of Foligno (1606);
- Giovanni Linati, Bishop of Borgo San Donnino (1606);
- Lodovico Magio, Bishop of Lucera (1609);
- Eleuterio Albergone, Bishop of Montemarano (1611);
- Pier Paolo Crescenzi, Cardinal-Priest of Santi Nereo e Achilleo (1612);
- Andrea Giustiniani, Bishop of Isola (1614);
- Vitalianus Visconti Borromeo, Titular Archbishop of Hadrianopolis in Haemimonto (1616);
- Vincenzo Landinelli, Bishop of Albenga (1616);
- Carlo Carafa (bishop of Aversa), Bishop of Aversa (1616);
- Innico Siscara, Bishop of Anglona-Tursi (1616);
- Nicolò Spínola, Bishop of Ventimiglia (1617);
- Miguel Angel Zaragoza Heredia, Bishop of Teano (1617);
- Pasquale Grassi, Bishop of Chioggia (1619);
- Giovanni Battista Stella, Bishop of Bitonto (1619);
- Alfonso Pozzi, Bishop of Borgo San Donnino (1620);
- Diofebo Farnese, Titular Patriarch of Jerusalem (1621);
- Pietro Dini, Archbishop of Fermo (1621);
- Odoardo Farnese (cardinal), Cardinal-Deacon of Sant'Adriano al Foro (1621);
- Aurelio Archinto, Bishop of Como (1621);
- Giuseppe Acquaviva, Titular Archbishop of Thebae (1621);
- Pierre François Maletti, Bishop of Nice (1622);
- Carlo Bovi, Bishop of Bagnoregio (1622);
- Marco Antonio Gozzadini, Cardinal-Priest of Sant'Eusebio (1622);
- Luigi Caetani, Titular Patriarch of Antioch (1622);
- Giovanni Pietro Volpi, Auxiliary Bishop of Novara (1622); and
- Girolamo Tantucci, Bishop of Grosseto (1622).

== External links and additional sources ==
- Cheney, David M. "Archdiocese of Bari-Bitonto". Catholic-Hierarchy.org. (for Chronology of Bishops) ^{[self-published]}
- Chow, Gabriel. "Metropolitan Archdiocese of Bari–Bitonto (Italy)". GCatholic.org. (for Chronology of Bishops) ^{[self-published]}

Catholic Church titles
Preceded by Bonviso Bonvisi	Archbishop of Bari-Canosa; 1604–1606	Succeeded by Decio Caracciolo Rosso
