= Antonio Bichi =

17th-century Catholic cardinal

His Eminence Antonio Bichi
- Bishop of Osimo
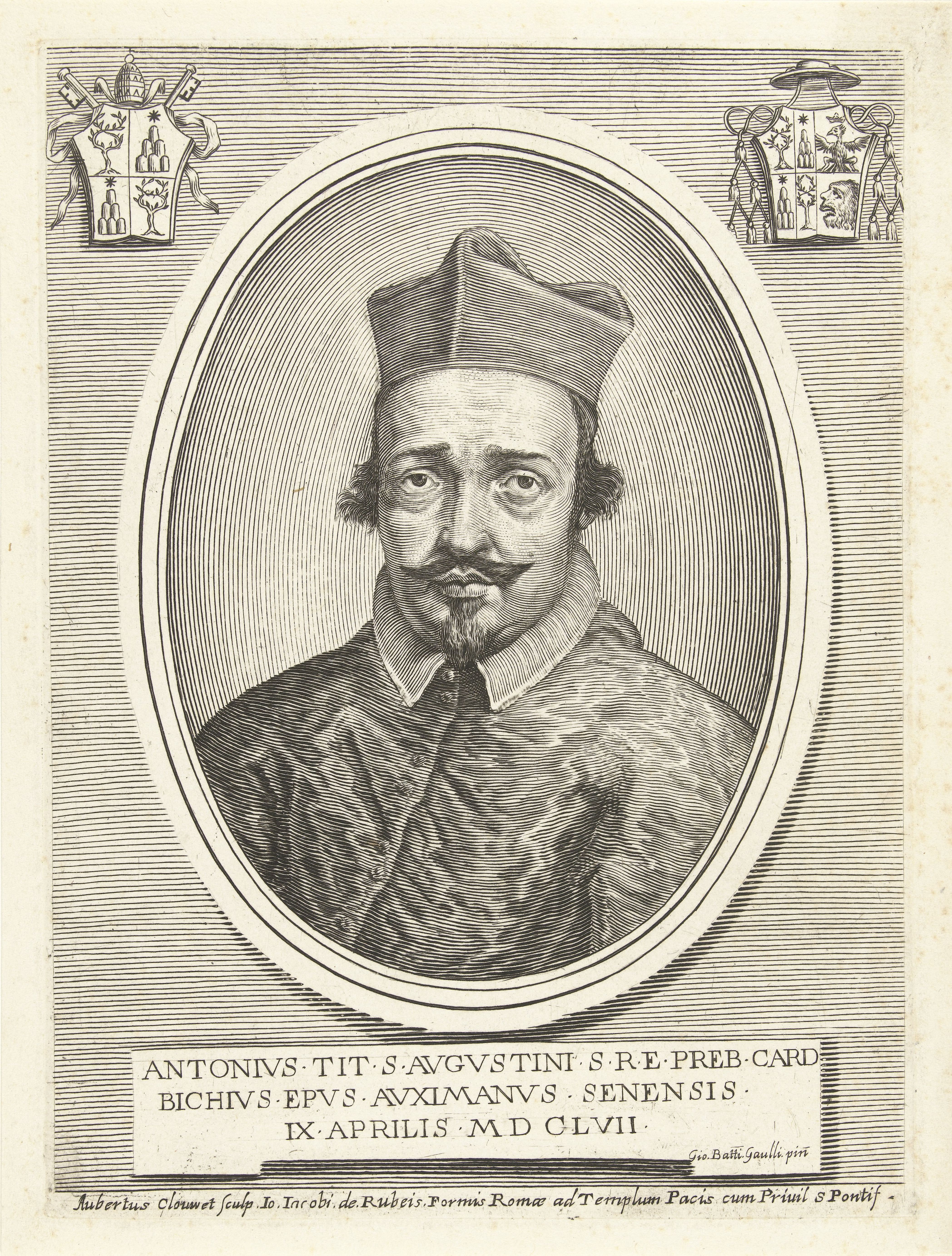
- Church: Roman Catholic Church
- Diocese: Osimo
- See: Osimo
- Appointed: 6 March 1656
- Term ended: 21 February 1691
- Predecessor: Lodovico Betti
- Successor: Opizio Pallavicini
- Other post: Cardinal-Bishop of Palestrina (1687-91)
- Previous posts: Apostolic Internuncio to Belgium (1642-52); Bishop of Montalcino (1652-56); Cardinal-Priest of Sant'Agostino (1659-67); Cardinal-Priest of Santa Maria degli Angeli (1667-87)

Orders
- Consecration: 8 December 1652 by Niccolò Albergati-Ludovisi
- Created cardinal: 9 April 1657 (in pectore); 10 November 1659 (revealed) by Pope Alexander VII
- Rank: Cardinal-Priest (1659-87); Cardinal-Bishop (1687-91)

Personal details
- Born: 30 March 1614 Siena, Papal States
- Died: 21 February 1691 (age 76) Osimo, Papal States
- Parents: Fermano Bichi; Onorata Mignanelli
- Education: University of Siena

Antonio Bichi (1614–1691) was a Roman Catholic cardinal.

== Biography ==
He was born in Siena to Onorata Mignanelli and Fermano Bichi. Antonio's maternal uncle was Pope Alexander VII, who named him cardinal in pectore by 1657.

On 8 Dec 1652, he was consecrated bishop by Niccolò Albergati-Ludovisi, Cardinal-Priest of Santa Maria degli Angeli e dei Martiri, with Ranuccio Scotti Douglas, Bishop Emeritus of Borgo San Donnino, and Filippo Casoni (bishop), Bishop of Borgo San Donnino, serving as co-consecrators.

While bishop, he was the principal consecrator of Paolo Pecci, Bishop of Massa Marittima (1679).
