= Papirio Picedi =

17th-century Roman Catholic bishop

Most Reverend Papirio Picedi
- Bishop of Parma
- Church: Catholic Church
- Diocese: Diocese of Parma
- In office: 1606–1614
- Predecessor: Ferdinando Farnese
- Successor: Alessandro Rossi
- Previous post: Bishop of Borgo San Donnino (1603–1606)

Orders
- Ordination: 1596
- Consecration: 19 Jan 1603 by Paolo Emilio Zacchia

Personal details
- Born: 1528 Arcola di Lunigiana, Italy
- Died: 4 March 1614 (aged 85–86)

Papirio Picedi (1528–1614) was a Roman Catholic prelate who served as Bishop of Parma (1606–1614) and Bishop of Borgo San Donnino (1603–1606).

== Biography ==
Papirio Picedi was born in Arcola di Lunigiana, Italy and ordained a priest in 1596. On 8 Jan 1603, he was appointed during the papacy of Pope Clement VIII as Bishop of Borgo San Donnino. On 19 Jan 1603, he was consecrated bishop by Paolo Emilio Zacchia, Cardinal-Priest of San Marcello al Corso, with Claudio Rangoni, Bishop of Piacenza, and Juan Esteban Ferrero, Bishop of Vercelli, with serving as co-consecrators. On 30 Aug 1606, he was appointed during the papacy of Pope Paul V as Bishop of Parma. He served as Bishop of Parma until his death on 4 Mar 1614.

== External links and additional sources ==
- Cheney, David M. "Diocese of Fidenza". Catholic-Hierarchy.org. (for Chronology of Bishops) ^{[self-published]}
- Chow, Gabriel. "Diocese of Fidenza (Italy)". GCatholic.org. (for Chronology of Bishops) ^{[self-published]}
- Cheney, David M. "Diocese of Parma (-Fontevivo)". Catholic-Hierarchy.org. (for Chronology of Bishops) ^{[self-published]}
- Chow, Gabriel. "Diocese of Parma (Italy)". GCatholic.org. (for Chronology of Bishops) ^{[self-published]}

Catholic Church titles
Preceded by	Bishop of Borgo San Donnino; 1603–1606	Succeeded by Giovanni Linati
Preceded by Ferdinando Farnese	Bishop of Parma; 1606–1614	Succeeded by Alessandro Rossi
