= Claudio Rangoni =

Claudio Rangoni may refer to:

- Claudio Rangoni (bishop of Piacenza) (died 1619), Italian Roman Catholic bishop
- Claudio Rangoni (bishop of Reggio Emilia) (1559-1621), Italian Roman Catholic bishop
