= Carlo Nembrini =

Italian Roman Catholic prelate

Most Reverend Carlo Nembrini
- Bishop of Parma
- Church: Catholic Church
- Diocese: Diocese of Parma
- In office: 1651–1677
- Predecessor: Girolamo Corio
- Successor: Tommaso Saladini

Orders
- Consecration: 7 July 1652 by Giovanni Battista Maria Pallotta

Personal details
- Born: 1611 Ancona, Italy
- Died: 16 August 1677 (aged 65–66) Parma, Italy

Carlo Nembrini (1611 – 16 August 1677) was a Roman Catholic prelate who served as Bishop of Parma (1651–1677).

== Biography ==
Carlo Nembrini was born in Ancona, Italy in 1611. On 1 July 1651, he was appointed during the papacy of Pope Innocent X as Bishop of Parma. On 7 July 1652, he was consecrated bishop by Giovanni Battista Maria Pallotta, Cardinal-Priest of San Silvestro in Capite, with Ranuccio Scotti Douglas, Bishop Emeritus of Borgo San Donnino, and Patrizio Donati, Bishop Emeritus of Minori serving as co-consecrators. He served as Bishop of Parma until his death on 16 August 1677. While bishop, he was the principal co-consecrator of Carlo Pio di Savoia, Bishop of Ferrara.

== External links and additional sources ==
- Cheney, David M. "Diocese of Parma (-Fontevivo)". Catholic-Hierarchy.org. (for Chronology of Bishops) ^{[self-published]}
- Chow, Gabriel. "Diocese of Parma (Italy)". GCatholic.org. (for Chronology of Bishops) ^{[self-published]}

Catholic Church titles
Preceded by Girolamo Corio	Bishop of Parma; 1651–1677	Succeeded by Tommaso Saladini
