= Pompeo Cornazzano =

17th-century Roman Catholic bishop

Most Reverend Pompeo Cornazzano
- Bishop of Parma
- Church: Catholic Church
- Diocese: Diocese of Parma
- In office: 1615–1647
- Predecessor: Alessandro Rossi
- Successor: Girolamo Corio

Orders
- Consecration: 8 Dec 1615 by Fabrizio Verallo

Personal details
- Born: 1576 Pavie, Italy
- Died: 5 July 1647 (aged 70–71)

Pompeo Cornazzano, O. Cist. (1576–1647) was a Roman Catholic prelate who served as Bishop of Parma (1615–1647).

== Biography ==
Pompeo Cornazzano was born in Pavie, Italy in 1576 and ordained a priest in the Order of Cistercians. On 2 Dec 1615, he was appointed during the papacy of Pope Paul V as Bishop of Parma. On 8 Dec 1615, he was consecrated bishop by Fabrizio Verallo, Cardinal-Priest of Sant'Agostino, with Giovanni Linati, Bishop of Borgo San Donnino, and Antonio Massa, Bishop of Castro del Lazio, serving as co-consecrators. He served as Bishop of Parma until his death on 5 Jul 1647.

While bishop, he was the principal co-consecrator of Hyacinthus Arnolfini, Bishop of Milos (1625); and Girolamo Binago, Titular Bishop of Laodicea in Phrygia and Auxiliary Bishop of Bologna (1637).

== External links and additional sources ==
- Cheney, David M. "Diocese of Parma (-Fontevivo)". Catholic-Hierarchy.org. (for Chronology of Bishops) ^{[self-published]}
- Chow, Gabriel. "Diocese of Parma (Italy)". GCatholic.org. (for Chronology of Bishops) ^{[self-published]}

Catholic Church titles
Preceded by Alessandro Rossi	Bishop of Parma; 1615–1647	Succeeded by Girolamo Corio
