= Girolamo Bernerio =

Italian Cardinal

His Eminence Girolamo Bernerio
- Cardinal-Bishop of Porto e Santa Rufina; Bishop Emeritus of Ascoli Piceno
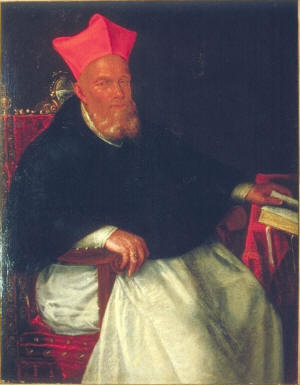
- Church: Catholic Church
- Diocese: Diocese of Ascoli Piceno
- In office: 1586-1605
- Predecessor: Giulio Roma
- Successor: Federico Sforza

Orders
- Consecration: 7 September 1586 by Giulio Antonio Santorio
- Created cardinal: 14 January 1587
- Rank: Cardinal-Bishop

Personal details
- Born: 1540 Corregio, Italy
- Died: 5 August 1611 (age 71)

Girolamo Cardinal Bernerio, O.P. (1540 – 5 August 1611) was an Italian Catholic prelate who served as Bishop of Ascoli Piceno from 1586 to 1605. He was made a cardinal in 1587.

== Biography ==
Bernerio was born in Corregio. He served as Bishop of Ascoli Piceno from 1586 until his resignation in 1605. He was elevated to cardinal on 16 November 1586 and installed as the Cardinal-Priest of S. Tommaso in Parione the following year. He subsequently became the Cardinal-Priest of S. Maria sopra Minerva (1589), the Cardinal-Priest of S. Lorenzo in Lucina (1602), the Cardinal-Bishop of Albano (1603) and the Cardinal-Bishop of Porto e Santa Rufina (1607).

On 7 September 1586, Bernario was consecrated to the episcopacy by Giulio Antonio Santorio with Giulio Masetti, Bishop of Reggio Emilia, and Ottavio Paravicini, Bishop of Alessandria, serving as co-consecrators. Through his own consecration of Galeazzo Sanvitale, Bernerio is in the episcopal lineage of Pope Francis, Pope Benedict XVI, and most modern bishops.

== Episcopal succession ==
Episcopal succession of Girolamo Bernerio

While bishop, he was the principal consecrator of:

- Costanzo de Sarnano, Bishop of Vercelli (1587);
- Tadeo O'Farrell, Bishop of Clonfert (1587);
- Vincenzo Serafino, Bishop of Teano (1588);
- Thomas Cammerota, Bishop of Vieste (1589);
- Michele Bonelli, Bishop of Albano (1591);
- Aurelio Novarini, Archbishop of Dubrovnik (1591);
- Ascanio Libertano, Bishop of Cagli (1591);
- Giovanni Antonio Onorati, Bishop of Terni (1591);
- Settimio Borsari, Bishop of Alessano (1591);
- Claudio Rangoni, Bishop of Reggio Emilia (1593);
- Jullio del Carretto, Bishop of Casale Monferrato (1594);
- Claudio Rangoni, Bishop of Piacenza (1596);
- Lorenzo Prezzato, Bishop of Chioggia (1601);
- Paolo Isaresi della Mirandola, Bishop of Squillace (1601);
- Eustache Fontana, Bishop of Andros (1602);
- Giovanni Desideri, Bishop of Rieti (1603);
- Girolamo Bernardino Pallantieri, Bishop of Bitonto (1603);
- Giovanni Domenico d'Ettore, Bishop of Ostuni (1604);
- Angelo Baroni, Bishop of Kotor (1604);
- Galeazzo Sanvitale, Archbishop of Bari (1604);
- Azarias Friton, Archbishop of Nakhchivan (1604);
- Marco Giustiniani, Bishop of Chios (1604);
- Martius Andreucci, Bishop of Trogir (1604);
- Giorgio Lazzari, Bishop of Minori (1604);
- Paolo Manara, Bishop of Acerno (1604);
- Francesco Pendasio, Bishop of Alba (1605);
- Francesco Simonetta, Bishop of Foligno (1606);
- Giulio Sansedoni, Bishop of Grosseto (1606);
- François-Etienne Dulci, Archbishop of Avignon (1609); and
- Stefano de Vicari, Bishop of Nocera de' Pagani (1610).

He also served as the principal co-consecrator of:

- Simeone Tagliavia d'Aragonia (1602).

== See also ==
- Catholic Church hierarchy
- College of Cardinals
- List of living cardinals
- Politics of Vatican City
- Roman Curia
