= Ranuccio Scotti Douglas =

Roman Catholic prelate

Most Reverend Ranuccio Scotti Douglas
- Bishop of Borgo San Donnino
- Church: Catholic Church
- Diocese: Diocese of Borgo San Donnino
- In office: 1627–1650
- Predecessor: Alfonso Pozzi
- Successor: Filippo Casoni
- Previous posts: Apostolic Nuncio to Switzerland (1630–1639); Apostolic Nuncio to France (1639–1641)

Orders
- Consecration: 18 April 1627 by Laudivio Zacchia

Personal details
- Born: 19 July 1597 Parma, Italy
- Died: 10 May 1659 (age 61)

Ranuccio Scotti Douglas or Ranuzio Scotti Douglas (19 July 1597 – 10 May 1659) was a Roman Catholic prelate who served as Bishop of Borgo San Donnino (1627–1650), Apostolic Nuncio to Switzerland (1630-1639), and Apostolic Nuncio to France (1639–1641).

== Biography ==
Ranuccio Scotti Douglas was born on 19 July 1597 in Parma, Italy. On 22 March 1627, he was appointed during the papacy of Pope Urban VIII as Bishop of Borgo San Donnino. On 18 April 1627, he was consecrated bishop by Laudivio Zacchia, Bishop of Corneto and Montefiascone and installed on 30 May 1627. On 20 May 1630, he was appointed by Pope Urban VIII as Apostolic Nuncio to Switzerland. On 7 September 1639, he was appointed by Pope Urban VIII as Apostolic Nuncio to France. In 1641, he resigned as Apostolic Nuncio to France. He served as Bishop of Borgo San Donnino until his resignation on 13 March 1650. He died on 10 May 1659.

== Episcopal succession ==
Episcopal succession of Ranuccio Scotti Douglas

While bishop, he was the principal consecrator of:

- Johann Flugi d'Apremont, Bishop of Chur (1636); and
- Giuseppe Battaglia, Bishop of Montemarano (1657);

and the principal co-consecrator of:

- John Roche, Bishop of Ferns (1627);
- Pietro Antonio Spinelli, Archbishop of Rossano (1629);
- Giovanni Battista Malaspina, Bishop of Massa Marittima (1629);
- Muzio Colonna, Bishop of Marsi (1629);
- Giambattista Spada, Titular Patriarch of Constantinople (1643);
- Pietro Vidoni (seniore), Bishop of Lodi (1644);
- Aniello Campagna, Bishop of Nusco (1645);
- Girolamo Codebò, Bishop of Montalto delle Marche (1645);
- Jacques Lebret, Bishop of Toul (1645);
- Michel Mazarin, Archbishop of Aix (1645);
- Giovanni Battista Aresti de Dovara, Archbishop of Aleppo (1645)
- Giovanni Battista Buonacorsi, Bishop of Colle di Val d’Elsa (1645);
- Andrea Massa, Bishop of Castellammare di Stabia (1645);
- Antonio Lupi, Bishop of Treviso (1645);
- Pomponio Spreti, Bishop of Cervia (1646);
- Pier Luigi Carafa, Bishop of Tricarico (1646);
- Donato Pascasio, Bishop of Trevico (1646);
- Ascanio Maffei, Archbishop of Urbino (1646);
- Bonaventura Claverio, Bishop of Potenza (1646);
- Louis de Fortia-Montréal, Bishop of Cavaillon (1646);
- Martino Megali, Bishop of Bova (1646);
- Giacomo Carafa, Archbishop of Rossano (1646);
- Francesco Antonio Depace, Bishop of Aquino (1646);
- Caesar Reghini, Bishop of Sarsina (1646);
- Federico Sforza, Bishop of Rimini (1646);
- César Argelli, Archbishop of Avignon (1647);
- Raphael Levacovich, Archbishop of Achrida (1647);
- Simeone de Summis, Bishop of Sapë (1647);
- Tommaso Imperato, Bishop of Vico Equense (1647);
- Giovanni Ambrogio Bicuti, Bishop of Acqui (1647);
- Pompeo Mignucci, Archbishop of Dubrovnik (1647);
- Antonio Pavonelli, Bishop of Venosa (1648);
- Gregorio Carafa, Bishop of Cassano all'Jonio (1648);
- Tommaso d'Aquino, Bishop of Mottola (1648);
- Nicola Dalmazzo, Bishop of Fossano (1648);
- Paolo Teutonico, Archbishop of Manfredonia (1649);
- Gian Giacomo Cristoforo, Bishop of Lacedonia (1649);
- Pietro Rota, Bishop of Lucca (1650);
- Leonardo Severoli, Bishop of San Severo (1650);
- Giuseppe Sanfelice, Archbishop of Cosenza (1650);
- Andreas Lanfranchi, Bishop of Ugento (1651);
- Benedetto Geraci, Bishop of Lipari (1651);
- Filippo Casoni, Bishop of Borgo San Donnino (1651);
- Ercole Coppola, Bishop of Nicotera (1651);
- Giacomo Giordano, Bishop of Lacedonia (1651);
- Thomas Tomassoni, Bishop of Umbriatico (1652);
- Sallustio Cherubini, Bishop of Città Ducale (1652);
- Rodrigo Cruzado Caballero, Auxiliary Bishop of Cuenca (1652);
- Girolamo Boncompagni, Archbishop of Bologna (1652);
- Ascanio Ugolini, Bishop of Muro Lucano (1652);
- Carlo Nembrini, Bishop of Parma (1652);
- Francesco Gaetano, Titular Archbishop of Rhodus (1652);
- Neri Corsini, Titular Archbishop of Tamiathis (1652);
- Giantommaso Gastaldi, Bishop of Brugnato (1652);
- Theodorus Skuminowicz, Auxiliary Bishop of Vilnius (1652);
- Filippo Jacobio, Bishop of Policastro (1652);
- Martino Denti de' Cipriani, Bishop of Strongoli (1652);
- Marcello Santacroce, Cardinal-Priest of Santo Stefano al Monte Celio (1652);
- Antonio Bichi, Bishop of Montalcino (1652);
- Girolamo Borghese, Bishop of Sovana (1652);
- Carlo Sgombrino, Bishop of Belcastro (1652);
- Paolo Emilio Rondinini, Cardinal-Deacon of Santa Maria in Aquiro (1653);
- Gerolamo Bollini, Bishop of Isernia (1653);
- Giovanni Granafei, Bishop of Alessano (1653);
- Celestino Bruni, Bishop of Boiano (1653); and
- Raimondo Castelli, Bishop of Narni (1656).

== Sources ==
- Blet, Pierre (1965). Correspondance du nonce en France Ranuccio Scotti: 1639-1641 (in French). Rome: Gregorian Biblical BookShop. ISBN 978-88-7652-489-9.
- Surchat, Pierre Louis (1979). Die Nuntiatur von Ranuccio Scotti in Luzern 1630–1639. Studien zur päpstlischen Diplomatie und zur Nuntiaturgeschichte des 17. Jahrhunderts. Rom-Freiburg-Wien 1979 [Römische Quartalschrift. 36. Supplementheft].

Catholic Church titles
Preceded by Alfonso Pozzi	Bishop of Borgo San Donnino; 1627–1650	Succeeded by Filippo Casoni
Preceded by Ciriaco Rocci	Apostolic Nuncio to Switzerland; 1630–1639	Succeeded by Girolamo Farnese
Preceded by Giorgio Bolognetti	Apostolic Nuncio to France; 1639–1641	Succeeded by Girolamo Grimaldi-Cavalleroni
