= Stefano Taverna =

15th-century Roman Catholic bishop

Most Reverend Stefano Taverna
- Bishop of Parma
- Church: Catholic Church
- Diocese: Diocese of Parma
- In office: 1497–1499
- Predecessor: Gian Giacomo Schiaffinato
- Successor: Giovanni Antonio Sangiorgio

Personal details
- Died: Jan 1499

Stefano Taverna (died 1499) was a Roman Catholic prelate who served as Bishop of Parma (1497–1499).

On 20 December 1497, Stefano Taverna was appointed during the papacy of Pope Alexander VI as Bishop of Parma. He served as Bishop of Parma until his death in Jan 1499.

== External links and additional sources ==
- Cheney, David M. "Diocese of Parma (-Fontevivo)". Catholic-Hierarchy.org. (for Chronology of Bishops) ^{[self-published]}
- Chow, Gabriel. "Diocese of Parma (Italy)". GCatholic.org. (for Chronology of Bishops) ^{[self-published]}

Catholic Church titles
Preceded by Gian Giacomo Schiaffinato	Bishop of Parma; 1497–1499	Succeeded by Giovanni Antonio Sangiorgio
