= Giacomo Carafa =

17th-century Roman Catholic bishop

Most Reverend Giacomo Carafa
- Archbishop of Rossano
- Church: Catholic Church
- Archdiocese: Archdiocese of Rossano
- In office: 1646–1664
- Predecessor: Pietro Antonio Spinelli
- Successor: Carlo Spinola (archbishop)

Orders
- Ordination: June 1646
- Consecration: 21 Oct 1646

Personal details
- Born: Naples, Italy
- Died: 7 April 1664

Giacomo Carafa (died 1664) was a Roman Catholic prelate who served as Archbishop of Rossano (1646–1664).

== Biography ==
Giacomo Carafa was born in Naples, Italy and ordained a priest in June 1646. On 18 Oct 1646, he was appointed during the papacy of Pope Innocent X as Archbishop of Rossano. On 21 Oct 1646, he was consecrated bishop by Pier Luigi Carafa (seniore), Cardinal-Priest of Santi Silvestro e Martino ai Monti, with Alfonso Sacrati, Bishop Emeritus of Comacchio, and Ranuccio Scotti Douglas, Bishop of Borgo San Donnino, serving as co-consecrators. He served as Archbishop of Rossano until his death on 7 Apr 1664.

== External links and additional sources ==
- Cheney, David M. "Archdiocese of Rossano-Cariati". Catholic-Hierarchy.org. (for Chronology of Bishops)
- Chow, Gabriel. "Archdiocese of Rossano-Cariati (Italy)". GCatholic.org. (for Chronology of Bishops)

Catholic Church titles
Preceded by Pietro Antonio Spinelli	Archbishop of Rossano; 1646–1664	Succeeded by Carlo Spinola (archbishop)
