= Giuseppe Olgiati =

Italian Catholic bishop (1660–1736)

Most Reverend Giuseppe Olgiati
- Bishop of Como
- Church: Catholic Church
- Diocese: Diocese of Como
- In office: 1711–1735
- Predecessor: Francesco Giambattista Bonesana
- Successor: Alberico Simonetta
- Previous post: Bishop of Parma (1694–1711)

Orders
- Ordination: 17 June 1693
- Consecration: 21 November 1694 by Gasparo Carpegna

Personal details
- Born: 10 December 1660 Milan, Italy
- Died: 29 July 1736 (aged 75) Como, Italy

Giuseppe Olgiati (10 December 1660 – 29 July 1736) was a Roman Catholic prelate who served as Bishop of Como (1711–1735) and Bishop of Parma (1694–1711).

== Biography ==
Giuseppe Olgiati was born in Milan, Italy on 10 December 1660. He was ordained a deacon on 7 June 1693 and ordained a priest on 17 June 1693. On 8 November 1694, he was appointed during the papacy of Pope Innocent XII as Bishop of Parma. On 21 November 1694, he was consecrated bishop by Gasparo Carpegna, Cardinal-Priest of Santa Maria in Trastevere. On 26 January 1711, he was appointed during the papacy of Pope Clement XI as Bishop of Como. He served as Bishop of Como until his resignation on 23 September 1735. He died on 29 July 1736.

== Episcopal succession ==
While bishop, he was the principal co-consecrator of:

- Carlo Ottaviano Guasco, Bishop of Alessandria della Paglia (1695);
- Alessandro Roncovieri, Bishop of Borgo San Donnino (1700);
- Paolo Andrea Borelli, Bishop of Noli (1700); and
- Bernardino Pecci, Bishop of Grosseto (1710).

== External links and additional sources ==
- Cheney, David M. "Diocese of Parma (-Fontevivo)". Catholic-Hierarchy.org. (for Chronology of Bishops) ^{[self-published]}
- Chow, Gabriel. "Diocese of Parma (Italy)". GCatholic.org. (for Chronology of Bishops) ^{[self-published]}
- Cheney, David M. "Diocese of Como". Catholic-Hierarchy.org. (for Chronology of Bishops) ^{[self-published]}
- Chow, Gabriel. "Diocese of Como (Italy)". GCatholic.org. (for Chronology of Bishops) ^{[self-published]}

Catholic Church titles
Preceded by Tommaso Saladini	Bishop of Parma; 1694–1711	Succeeded by Camillo Marazzani
Preceded by Francesco Giambattista Bonesana	Bishop of Como; 1711–1735	Succeeded by Alberico Simonetta
