= Giovanni Desideri =

Roman Catholic Bishop

Most Reverend Giovanni Desideri
- Church: Catholic Church
- Diocese: Diocese of Rieti
- In office: 1603–1604
- Predecessor: Giulio Cesare Segni
- Successor: Gaspare Pasquali

Orders
- Consecration: 6 July 1603 by Girolamo Bernerio

Personal details
- Born: 1568 Nursia, Italy
- Died: 1604 (age 36) Rieti, Italy

Giovanni Desideri or Giovanni Conte (died 1604) was a Roman Catholic prelate who served as Bishop of Rieti (1603–1604).

== Biography ==
Giovanni Desideri was born in 1568 and ordained a priest on 15 March 1603. On 16 Jun 1603, he was appointed during the papacy of Pope Clement VIII as Bishop of Rieti. On 6 July 1603, he was consecrated bishop by Girolamo Bernerio, Cardinal-Bishop of Albano, with Claudio Rangoni, Bishop of Piacenza, and Andrea Sorbolonghi, Bishop of Gubbio, serving as co-consecrators. He served as Bishop of Rieti until his death in 1604.

== See also ==
- Catholic Church in Italy

== External links and additional sources ==
- Cheney, David M. "Diocese of Rieti (-S. Salvatore Maggiore)". Catholic-Hierarchy.org. (for Chronology of Bishops) ^{[self-published]}
- Chow, Gabriel. "Diocese of Rieti (Italy)". GCatholic.org. (for Chronology of Bishops) ^{[self-published]}

Catholic Church titles
Preceded by Giulio Cesare Segni	Bishop of Rieti; 1603–1604	Succeeded by Gaspare Pasquali
