= Johann Flugi d'Apremont =

Most Reverend Johann Flugi d'Apremont
- Bishop of Chur
- Church: Catholic Church
- Diocese: Diocese of Chur
- In office: 1636-1661
- Predecessor: Joseph Mohr von Zernetz
- Successor: Ulrich de Mont

Orders
- Ordination: 1621
- Consecration: 14 December 1636 by Ranuccio Scotti Douglas

Personal details
- Born: 13 December 1595 La Punt-Chamues
- Died: 24 January 1661 (age 65) Chur

Johann Flugi d'Apremont (13 December 1595 - 24 January 1661) was a Roman Catholic prelate who served as Bishop of Chur (1636–1661).

== Biography ==
D'Apremont was born in La Punt-Chamues on 13 December 1595 and ordained a priest in 1621. He was selected as Bishop of Chur on 1 February 1636 and confirmed by Pope Urban VIII on 22 September 1636. On 14 December 1636, he was consecrated bishop by Ranuccio Scotti Douglas, Bishop of Borgo San Donnino. He served as Bishop of Chur until his death on 24 January 1661.

== External links and additional sources ==
- Cheney, David M. "Diocese of Chur". Catholic-Hierarchy.org. (for Chronology of Bishops) ^{[self-published]}
- Chow, Gabriel. "Diocese of Chur (Switzerland)". GCatholic.org. (for Chronology of Bishops) ^{[self-published]}

Catholic Church titles
Preceded by Joseph Mohr von Zernetz	Bishop of Chur; 1636–1661	Succeeded by Ulrich de Mont
