= Juan Esteban Ferrero =

Italian Roman Catholic bishop (1568–1610)

Most Reverend Juan Esteban Ferrero
- Bishop of Vercelli
- Church: Catholic Church
- Diocese: Diocese of Vercelli
- In office: 1599–1610
- Predecessor: Marcantonio Visia
- Successor: Giacomo Goria
- Previous post: Apostolic Nuncio to Emperor (1604–1607)

Orders
- Consecration: 1 May 1599 by Federico Borromeo

Personal details
- Born: 3 November 1568 Biella, Italy
- Died: 21 September 1610 (age 41) Turin, Italy

Juan Esteban Ferrero, O. Cist. or Giovanni Stefano Ferrero (1568–1610) was a Roman Catholic prelate who served as Bishop of Vercelli (1599–1610) and Apostolic Nuncio to Emperor (1604–1607).

== Biography ==
Juan Esteban Ferrero was born in Biella, Italy on 3 November 1568 and ordained a priest in the Cistercian Order. On 29 March 1599, he was appointed during the papacy of Pope Clement VIII as Bishop of Vercelli. On 1 May 1599, he was consecrated bishop by Federico Borromeo (seniore), Archbishop of Milan, with Fabio Biondi, Titular Patriarch of Jerusalem, and Carlo Conti, Bishop of Ancona e Numana, serving as co-consecrators. On 20 January 1604, he was appointed during the papacy of Pope Clement VIII as Apostolic Nuncio to Emperor; he resigned on 3 May 1607. He served as Bishop of Vercelli until his death on 21 September 1610.

== Episcopal succession ==
Episcopal succession of Juan Esteban Ferrero

While bishop, he was the principal co-consecrator of:

- Orazio Mattei, Bishop of Gerace (1601);
- Giovanni Giovenale Ancina, Bishop of Saluzzo (1602);
- Andrés Fernández de Córdoba y Carvajal, Bishop of Badajoz (1602);
- Papirio Picedi, Bishop of Borgo San Donnino (1603); and
- Charles von Lamberg, Archbishop of Prague (1607).

== External links and additional sources ==
- Cheney, David M. "Nunciature to Emperor (Germany)". Catholic-Hierarchy.org. (for Chronology of Bishops) ^{[self-published]}
- Cheney, David M. "Archdiocese of Vercelli". Catholic-Hierarchy.org. (for Chronology of Bishops) ^{[self-published]}
- Chow, Gabriel. "Archdiocese of Vercelli (Italy)". GCatholic.org. (for Chronology of Bishops) ^{[self-published]}

Catholic Church titles
Preceded by Filippo Spinelli	Apostolic Nuncio to Emperor; 1604–1607	Succeeded by Antonio Caetani (iuniore)
Preceded by Marcantonio Visia	Bishop of Vercelli; 1599–1610	Succeeded by Giacomo Goria
