= Pietro Antonio Spinelli =

1xth-century Roman Catholic bishop

Most Reverend Pietro Antonio Spinelli
- Archbishop of Rossano
- Church: Catholic Church
- Diocese: Archdiocese of Rossano
- In office: 1629–1645
- Predecessor: Paolo Torelli
- Successor: Giacomo Carafa

Orders
- Consecration: 4 June 1629 by Carlo Emmanuele Pio di Savoia

Personal details
- Born: 18 January 1597 Torre, Italy
- Died: 9 December 1645 (age 48)

Pietro Antonio Spinelli (18 January 1597 – 9 December 1645) was a Roman Catholic prelate who served as Archbishop of Rossano (1629–1645).

== Biography ==
Pietro Antonio Spinelli was born in Torre, Italy, on 18 January 1597. On 28 May 1629, he was appointed during the papacy of Pope Urban VIII as Archbishop of Rossano. On 4 June 1629, he was consecrated bishop by Carlo Emmanuele Pio di Savoia, Cardinal-Bishop of Albano, with Paolo Emilio Santori, Archbishop of Urbino, and Ranuccio Scotti Douglas, Bishop of Borgo San Donnino, serving as co-consecrators. He served as Archbishop of Rossano until his death on 9 December 1645.

== Episcopal succession ==
While bishop, he was the principal co-consecrator of:

- Onorato Onorati, Bishop of Urbania e Sant'Angelo in Vado (1636);
- Urbano Zambotti, Bishop of Montemarano (1640);
- Vencent Cavaselice, Bishop of Carinola (1640); and
- Gregorio Panzani, Bishop of Mileto (1640).

== External links and additional sources ==
- Cheney, David M. "Archdiocese of Rossano-Cariati". Catholic-Hierarchy.org. (for Chronology of Bishops)
- Chow, Gabriel. "Archdiocese of Rossano-Cariati (Italy)". GCatholic.org. (for Chronology of Bishops)

Catholic Church titles
Preceded by Paolo Torelli	Archbishop of Rossano; 1629–1645	Succeeded by Giacomo Carafa
