= Bonicelli =

Bonicelli is a surname. Notable people with the surname include:

- Fiorella Bonicelli (born 1951), Uruguayan tennis player
- Silvio Cesare Bonicelli (1932–2009), Italian Roman Catholic bishop
