= Giovanni Linati =

Roman Catholic prelate

Most Reverend Giovanni Giorgio Linati
- Bishop of Piacenza
- Church: Catholic Church
- Diocese: Diocese of Piacenza
- In office: 1619–1627
- Predecessor: Claudio Rangoni
- Successor: Alessandro Scappi
- Previous post: Bishop of Borgo San Donnino (1606–1619)

Orders
- Consecration: 13 December 1606 by Carlo Conti

Personal details
- Born: 1562 Parma, Italy
- Died: 3 April 1627 (age 65) Piacenza, Italy

Giovanni Linati (1562–1627) was a Roman Catholic prelate who served as Bishop of Piacenza (1619–1627) and Bishop of Borgo San Donnino (1606–1619).

== Biography ==
Giovanni Linati was born in Parma, Italy in 1562. On 4 December 1606, he was appointed during the papacy of Pope Paul V as Bishop of Borgo San Donnino and was installed on 24 December 1606. On 13 December 1606, he was consecrated bishop by Carlo Conti, Bishop of Ancona e Numana, with Galeazzo Sanvitale, Archbishop Emeritus of Bari-Canosa, and Claudio Rangoni, Bishop of Piacenza, serving as co-consecrators. On 9 October 1619, he was appointed during the papacy of Pope Paul V as Bishop of Piacenza. He served as Bishop of Piacenza until his death on 3 April 1627.

While bishop, he was the principal co-consecrator of Pompeo Cornazzano, Bishop of Parma (1615).

== External links and additional sources ==
- Cheney, David M. "Diocese of Fidenza". Catholic-Hierarchy.org. (for Chronology of Bishops) ^{[self-published]}
- Chow, Gabriel. "Diocese of Fidenza (Italy)". GCatholic.org. (for Chronology of Bishops) ^{[self-published]}
- Cheney, David M. "Diocese of Piacenza-Bobbio". Catholic-Hierarchy.org. (for Chronology of Bishops) ^{[self-published]}
- Chow, Gabriel. "Diocese of Piacenza-Bobbio". GCatholic.org. (for Chronology of Bishops) ^{[self-published]}

Catholic Church titles
Preceded by Papirio Picedi	Bishop of Borgo San Donnino; 1606–1619	Succeeded by Alfonso Pozzi
Preceded by Claudio Rangoni	Bishop of Piacenza; 1619–1627	Succeeded by Alessandro Scappi
