= Adeodato Turchi =

Most Reverend Adeodato Turchi
- Bishop of Parma
- Vieira Lusitano, Portrait of Adeodato Turchi, 1795, Galleria nazionale di Parma
- Church: Catholic Church
- Diocese: Diocese of Parma
- In office: 1788-1803

Orders
- Ordination: 24 September 1747

Personal details
- Born: 5 August 1724 Parma, Italy
- Died: 2 September 1803 (aged 79) Parma, Italy

Adeodato Turchi (5 August 1724 – 2 September 1803) was a Roman Catholic prelate who served as Bishop of Parma.

== Biography ==
He was born Dominque Charles Marie Turchi to indigent parents in Parma, Italy on 5 August 1724. He studied under the Jesuits. By the age of 23 years, he was ordained a priest in the order of St Francis Capuchin on 24 September 1747.

He gained fame in Italy for his sermons, including one in 1764: Discorso sul segreto politico before the Senate of Lucca. He obtained an appointment in the court of Ferdinand I, Duke of Parma. However, in Parma he was involved in disputes with other preachers and with a cousin of the Pope Clement XIII, Carlo Gastone della Torre Rezzonico. This dispute may have cost him advancement to cardinal. His sermons were collected and published.

On 21 September 1788, he was appointed during the papacy of Pope Pius VI as Bishop of Parma. He was consecrated bishop by Andrea Corsini, Cardinal-bishop of Santa Sabina. He served as Bishop of Parma until his resignation on 23 September 1735. He died on 2 September 1803.

Catholic Church titles
Preceded by Francesco Pettorelli Lalatta	Bishop of Parma; 1788–1803	Succeeded by Carlo Francesco Maria Caselli
