= Claudio Rangoni (bishop of Piacenza) =

Roman Catholic prelate

Most Reverend Claudio Rangoni
- Bishop of Piacenza
- Church: Catholic Church
- Diocese: Diocese of Piacenza
- In office: 1596–1619
- Predecessor: Filippo Sega
- Successor: Giovanni Linati

Orders
- Consecration: 3 December 1596 by Girolamo Bernerio

Personal details
- Died: 13 September 1619 Piacenza, Italy

Claudio Rangoni (died 13 September 1619) was a Roman Catholic prelate who served as Bishop of Piacenza (1596–1619).

== Biography ==
On 16 December 1592, Claudio Rangoni was appointed during the papacy of Pope Clement VIII as Bishop of Piacenza. On 3 December 1596, he was consecrated bishop by Girolamo Bernerio, Bishop of Ascoli Piceno and installed on 23 March 1597. He served as Bishop of Piacenza until his death on 13 September 1619.

== Episcopal succession ==
While bishop, he was the principal co-consecrator of:

- Papirio Picedi, Bishop of Borgo San Donnino (1603);
- Giovanni Desideri, Bishop of Rieti (1603);
- Galeazzo Sanvitale, Archbishop of Bari-Canosa (1604);
- Berlinghiero Gessi, Bishop of Rimini (1606); and
- Giovanni Linati, Bishop of Borgo San Donnino (1606).

== External links and additional sources ==
- Cheney, David M. "Diocese of Piacenza-Bobbio". Catholic-Hierarchy.org. (for Chronology of Bishops) ^{[self-published]}
- Chow, Gabriel. "Diocese of Piacenza-Bobbio". GCatholic.org. (for Chronology of Bishops) ^{[self-published]}

Catholic Church titles
Preceded by Filippo Sega	Bishop of Piacenza; 1596–1619	Succeeded by Giovanni Linati
