= Filippo Casoni (bishop) =

17th-century Roman Catholic bishop

Most Reverend Filippo Casoni
- Bishop of Borgo San Donnino
- Church: Catholic Church
- Diocese: Diocese of Borgo San Donnino
- In office: 1651–1659
- Predecessor: Ranuccio Scotti Douglas
- Successor: Alessandro Pallavicini

Orders
- Consecration: 12 Mar 1651 by Giulio Roma

Personal details
- Born: 1599
- Died: 22 July 1659 (aged 59–60)

Filippo Casoni (1599–1659) was a Roman Catholic prelate who served as Bishop of Borgo San Donnino (1651–1659).

== Biography ==
Filippo Casoni was born in 1599 in Sarzana, Italy. On 27 Feb 1651, he was appointed during the papacy of Pope Innocent X as Bishop of Borgo San Donnino. On 12 Mar 1651, he was consecrated bishop by Giulio Roma, Cardinal-Bishop of Porto e Santa Rufina, with Ranuccio Scotti Douglas, Bishop Emeritus of Borgo San Donnino, and Francesco Biglia, Bishop of Pavia, serving as co-consecrators. He served as Bishop of Borgo San Donnino until his death on 22 Jul 1659.

While bishop, he was the principal co-consecrator of Rinaldo d'Este, Bishop of Reggio Emilia (1651); and Antonio Bichi, Bishop of Montalcino (1652).

== External links and additional sources ==
- Cheney, David M. "Diocese of Fidenza". Catholic-Hierarchy.org. (for Chronology of Bishops) ^{[self-published]}
- Chow, Gabriel. "Diocese of Fidenza (Italy)". GCatholic.org. (for Chronology of Bishops) ^{[self-published]}

Catholic Church titles
Preceded by Ranuccio Scotti Douglas	Bishop of Borgo San Donnino; 1651–1659	Succeeded by Alessandro Pallavicini
