= Gianni Ambrosio =

Italian Catholic bishop

- Roman Catholic Bishop of Piacenza-Bobbio
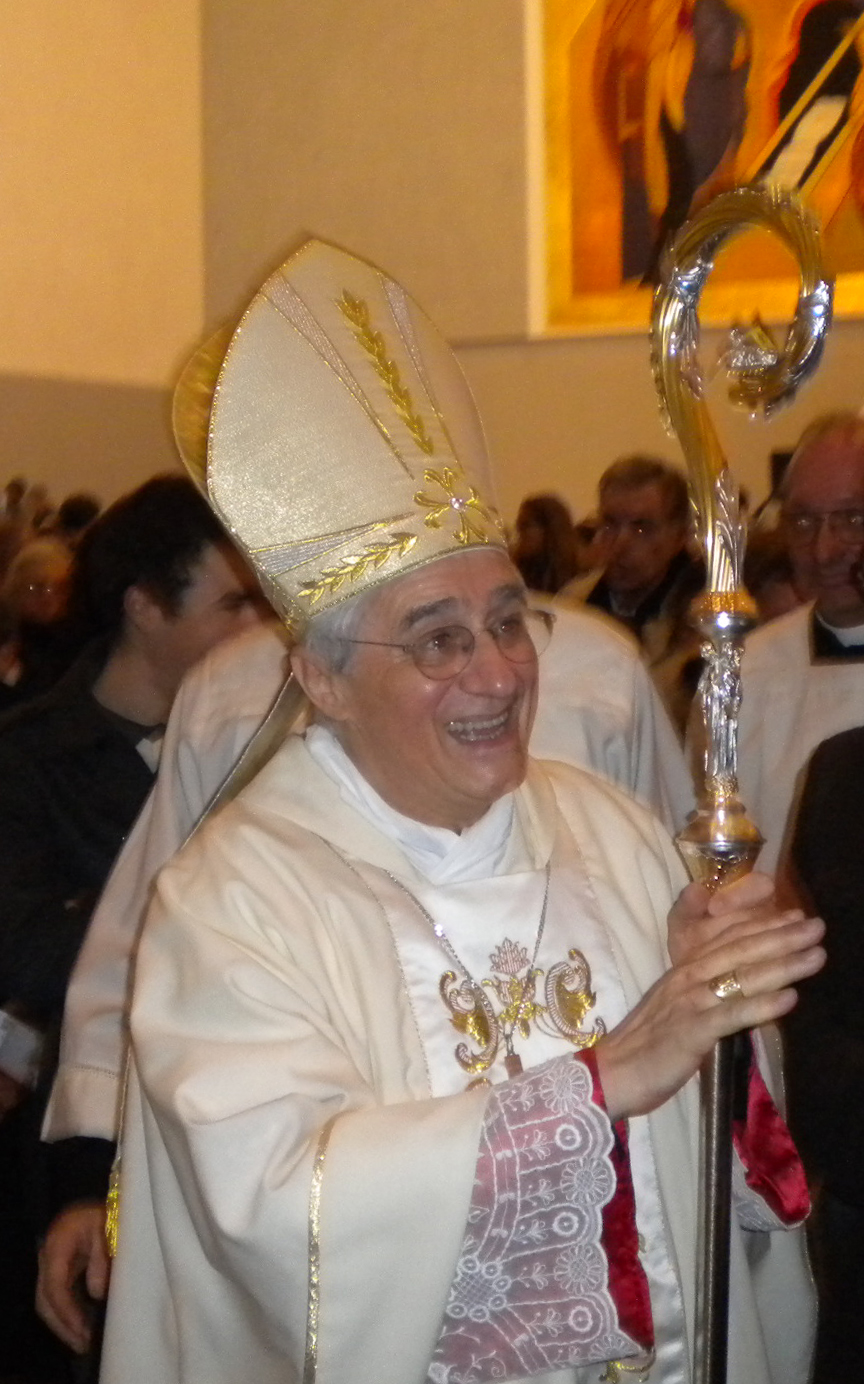
- Church: Roman Catholic Church
- See: Roman Catholic Diocese of Piacenza-Bobbio
- In office: 2008–2020
- Predecessor: Luciano Monari
- Successor: Adriano Cevolotto

Orders
- Ordination: July 7, 1968 by Archbishop Albino Mensa
- Consecration: February 16, 2008 by Cardinal Tarcisio Bertone

Personal details
- Born: December 23, 1943 (age 82) Santhià, Italy
- Coat of arms

Gianni Ambrosio (born 23 December 1943 in Santhià) is the emeritus bishop of the Roman Catholic Diocese of Piacenza-Bobbio.

== Biography ==
Born in Santhià on 23 December 1943, he studied theology in minor and major seminaries of Vercelli and on 7 July 1968 he was ordained priest.

In 1970 he obtained a diploma in social sciences at the Institut Catholique in Paris and in 1972 he obtained the specialization-diploma in sociology at the École pratique des hautes études at the Sorbonne University. He was a member of the international scientific committee of CESNUR.

In 1995 he graduated in theology in Rome at the Pontifical Lateran University.

From 1974 to 1988 he taught religion and was parochial vicar in the parishes of Santhià and Moncrivello. From 1988 to 2001 he was pastor of the parish of St. Paul in Vercelli. In 1996 he was named honorary prelate of His Holiness.

22 December 2007 Pope Benedict XVI appointed him as bishop of diocese of Piacenza, succeeding to Monsignor Luciano Monari. He was consecrated bishop in the cathedral of Piacenza on 16 February 2008 by Cardinal Tarcisio Bertone.

He retired on 16 July 2020.

== Publications ==
- Ambrosio G. et al., Per una pastorale che si rinnova, Leumann: Elle Di Ci, 1981
- Ambrosio G., Chiesa e mondo in dialogo: dal modello conciliare ai programmi pastorali della CEI, stampa, 1983
- Angelini G., Ambrosio G., Laico e cristiano: fede e le condizioni comuni del vivere Genova: Marietti, 1987
- Ambrosio G. et al., Comunicazione e ritualita : la celebrazione liturgica alla verifica delle leggi della comunicazione, Padua: Messaggero, 1988
- Ambrosio G. et al., Chiesa e parrocchia, Rivoli: Elle Di Ci, 1989
- Ambrosio G. et al., La dottrina sociale della Chiesa, Milan: Glossa, 1989
- Ambrosio G. et al., Percorsi di chiese : un cammino pastorale : Milan 1980-1990, Milano: Ancora, 1990
- Ambrosio G., Da cristiani nella società: la questione sociale in provincia di Vercelli, Vercelli: Edizioni della Sede provinciale delle A.C.L.I., 1991
- Ambrosio G. et al., Messaggi alle chiese : le parole forti del postconcilio, Milan: Ancora, 1992
- Ambrosio G. et al., Cristianesimo e religione, Milan: Glossa, 1992
- Ambrosio G. et al., Parrocchia e dintorni : tracce per una riflessione pastorale, Milano: Ancora, 1993
- Ambrosio G. et al., La carità e la Chiesa: virtù e ministero, Milan: Glossa, 1993
- Ambrosio G. et al., Nuove ritualità e irrazionale : come far rivivere il mistero liturgico, Padova: Messaggero, 1993
- Ambrosio G. et al., La chiesa e il declino della politica, Milan: Glossa, 1994
- Ambrosio G., Zai L., Gioventù virtuale: indagine sui giovani vercellesi dai 17 ai 24 anni, Vercelli, 1994
- Ambrosio G. et al., La formazione della coscienza morale, Rome: AVE, 1995
- Ambrosio G. et al., L'omelia : un messaggio a rischio, Padova: Messaggero, 1996
- Ambrosio G. et al., Il vangelo della carità chiama i giovani, Milan: Ancora, 1996
- Ambrosio G. et al., La Chiesa e i media, Milan: Glossa 1996
- Ambrosio G. et al., Le sette religiose, Milan: Encora, 1996
- Enciclopedia del cristianesimo: storia e attualità di 2000 anni di speranza, Novara: Istituto geografico De Agostini, 1997
- Ambrosio G. et al., Il primato della formazione, Milan: Glossa, 1997
- Ambrosio G. et al., Apocalittica e liturgia del compimento, Padova: Messaggero, 2000
- Ambrosio G. et al., Il progetto culturale della Chiesa italiana e l'idea di cultura, prefazione: Camillo Ruini, Milan: Glossa, 2000
- Ambrosio G. et al., Genitori e figli nella famiglia affettiva, Milan: Glossa, 2002
- Ambrosio G. et al., Fede cristiana e diversità religiosa, Bergamo: Litostampa, 2003
- Ambrosio G. et al., La democrazia in questione: politica, cultura e religione, Milan: Glossa, 2004
- Ambrosio G., L'avventura entusiasmante dell'Università Cattolica : pellegrinaggio alle origini, Milan: V&P, 2006

== Bibliography ==
- Il Nuovo Giornale, settimanale della diocesi di Piacenza

== Resources ==
- Profile of Mons. Ambrosio
- Official site of Piacenza's Diocese
