= Girolamo Corio =

1xth-century Roman Catholic bishop

Most Reverend Girolamo Corio
- Bishop of Parma
- Church: Catholic Church
- Diocese: Diocese of Parma
- In office: 1650–1651
- Predecessor: Pompeo Cornazzano
- Successor: Carlo Nembrini

Orders
- Consecration: 6 Jun 1650 by Giovanni Giacomo Panciroli

Personal details
- Born: Milan, Italy
- Died: 26 July 1651

Girolamo Corio or Girolamo Coiro (died 1651) was a Roman Catholic prelate who served as Bishop of Parma (1650–1651).

== Biography ==
Girolamo Corio was born in Milan, Italy. On 2 May 1650, he was appointed during the papacy of Pope Innocent X as Bishop of Parma. On 6 Jun 1650, he was consecrated bishop by Giovanni Giacomo Panciroli, Cardinal-Priest of Santo Stefano al Monte Celio, with Giovanni Battista Rinuccini, Archbishop of Fermo, and Luca Torreggiani, Archbishop of Ravenna, serving as co-consecrators. He served as Bishop of Parma until his death on 26 Jul 1651.

== External links and additional sources ==
- Cheney, David M. "Diocese of Parma (-Fontevivo)". Catholic-Hierarchy.org. (for Chronology of Bishops) ^{[self-published]}
- Chow, Gabriel. "Diocese of Parma (Italy)". GCatholic.org. (for Chronology of Bishops) ^{[self-published]}

Catholic Church titles
Preceded by Pompeo Cornazzano	Bishop of Parma; 1650–1651	Succeeded by Carlo Nembrini
