= Bernardo Zambernelli =

15th-century Roman Catholic bishop

Most Reverend Bernardo Zambernelli
- Bishop of Parma
- Church: Catholic Church
- Diocese: Diocese of Parma
- In office: 1412–1425
- Predecessor: Giovanni Rusconi
- Successor: Delfino della Pergola

Personal details
- Died: 11 July 1425

Bernardo Zambernelli, O.F.M. Conv. or Bernardo di Giambernardello Pace da Carpi or Bernardo Pace (died 1425) was a Roman Catholic prelate who served as Bishop of Parma (1412–1425).

== Biography ==
Bernardo Zambernelli was ordained a priest in the Order of Friars Minor Conventual. In 1412, he was appointed during the papacy of Pope Gregory XII as Bishop of Parma. He served as Bishop of Parma until his death on 11 Jul 1425.

== External links and additional sources ==
- Cheney, David M. "Diocese of Parma (-Fontevivo)". Catholic-Hierarchy.org. (for Chronology of Bishops) ^{[self-published]}
- Chow, Gabriel. "Diocese of Parma (Italy)". GCatholic.org. (for Chronology of Bishops) ^{[self-published]}

Catholic Church titles
Preceded by Giovanni Rusconi	Bishop of Parma; 1412–1425	Succeeded by Delfino della Pergola
