= Antonio Lanfranchi =

Italian Roman Catholic archbishop

- Archbishop of Modena–Nonantola
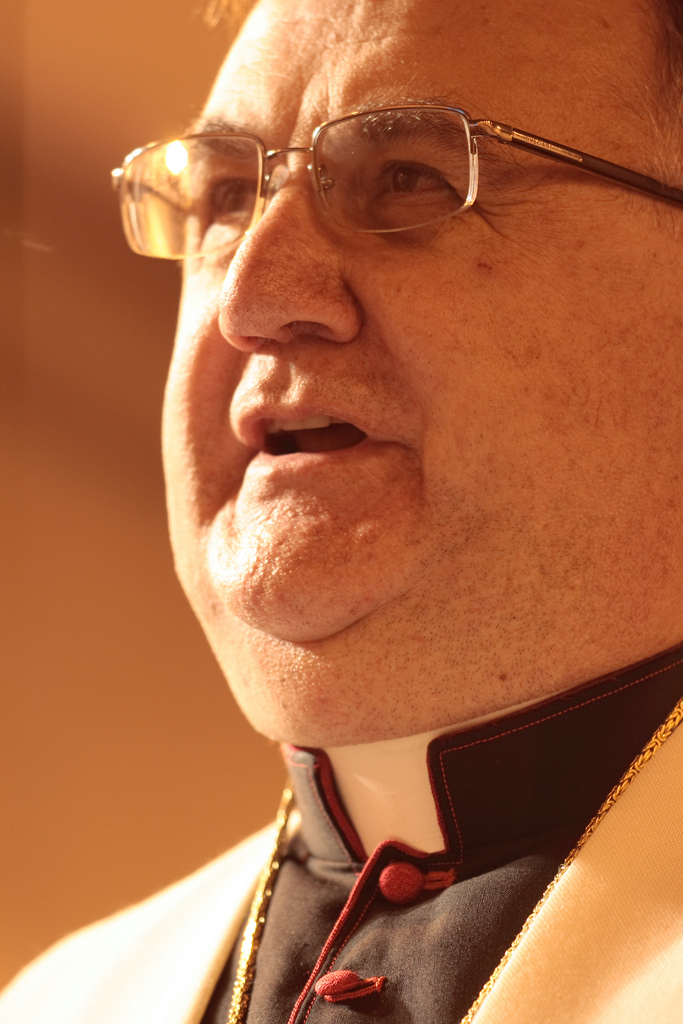
- Mgr Antonio Lanfranchi in 2008
- Church: Catholic Church
- Archdiocese: Archdiocese of Modena–Nonantola
- In office: 27 January 2010 – 17 February 2015
- Predecessor: Benito Cocchi
- Successor: Erio Castellucci
- Previous post: Bishop of Cesena-Sarsina (2003-2010)

Orders
- Ordination: 4 November 1971 by Enrico Manfredini
- Consecration: 1 January 2004 by Luciano Monari

Personal details
- Born: 17 May 1946 Grondone, Ferriere, Province of Piacenza, Kingdom of Italy
- Died: 17 February 2015 (aged 68) Modena, Emilia-Romagna, Italy

Antonio Lanfranchi (17 May 1946 – 17 February 2015) was a Roman Catholic archbishop.

Ordained to the priesthood in 1971, Lanfranchi was named bishop of the Diocese of Cesena-Sarsina, Italy, in 2003. In 2010, he was named archbishop of Modena-Nonantola. He died while still in office.
