= Benito Cocchi =

- Archbishop of Modena–Nonantola
- Church: Catholic Church
- Archdiocese: Archdiocese of Modena–Nonantola
- In office: 12 April 1996 – 27 January 2010
- Predecessor: Santo Bartolomeo Quadri
- Successor: Antonio Lanfranchi
- Previous posts: Bishop of Parma (1982-1996); Apostolic Administrator of Piacenza-Bobbio (1994-1995); Titular Bishop of Zaraï (1974-1982); Auxiliary Bishop of Bologna (1974-1982)

Orders
- Ordination: 14 March 1959
- Consecration: 6 January 1975 by Giacomo Lercaro

Personal details
- Born: 5 November 1934 Minerbio, Province of Bologna, Kingdom of Italy
- Died: 5 May 2016 (aged 81) Bologna, Emilia-Romagna, Italy

Benito Cocchi (5 November 1934 – 5 May 2016) was an Italian Catholic prelate.

Ordained to the priesthood in 1959, Cocchi served as an auxiliary bishop for the Archdiocese of Bologna from 1974 until 1982. He then served as Bishop of Parma from 1982 to 1996. Cocchi then served as Archbishop of Modena-Nonantola from 1996 until 2010.

He presided at the funeral Mass of Luciano Pavarotti in Modena's Duomo on 8 September 2007.
