= Giovanni Rusconi =

14th/15th century Roman Catholic bishop

Most Reverend Giovanni Rusconi
- Bishop of Parma
- Church: Catholic Church
- Diocese: Diocese of Parma
- In office: 1412–1425
- Predecessor: Beltrando da Borsano
- Successor: Bernardo Zambernelli

Personal details
- Died: Sep 1412

Giovanni Rusconi (died 1412) was a Roman Catholic prelate who served as Bishop of Parma (1383–1412).

== Biography ==
He was born in Como to the noble Lombard family of Rusca (or Rusconi), at the time very powerful and related to the Visconti of Milan.

At the request of Gian Galeazzo Visconti he was appointed bishop of Parma by Pope Urban VI. The date of his investiture is not known precisely, but it was certainly between 1380 and 1381.

During his episcopate, strengthened by the support of the Visconti lineage, he was mainly concerned with defending and increasing the privileges of the Parma church. Just after his inauguration he excommunicated all those who occupied the bishop's property. On several occasions he had disputes with tax collectors who demanded the payment of duties and gabelle, and the Duke of Milan reconfirmed the exemption from such taxes for the Church of Parma and its subjects. In 1399 he succeeded in obtaining a ruling declaring the entire Mezzani territory under the jurisdiction of the Bishop of Parma while another ruling exempted them from all duties.

In 1398 he had the Rusconi chapel erected in the Cattedrale di Santa Maria Assunta, in Gothic style dedicated to St. John and whose frescoes rediscovered in the 1830s have been attributed to Martino da Verona.

He served as Bishop of Parma until his death in September 1412. Rusconi was buried in the chapel he had built.

== External links and additional sources ==
- Cheney, David M. "Diocese of Parma (-Fontevivo)". Catholic-Hierarchy.org. (for Chronology of Bishops) ^{[self-published]}
- Chow, Gabriel. "Diocese of Parma (Italy)". GCatholic.org. (for Chronology of Bishops) ^{[self-published]}

Catholic Church titles
Preceded by Beltrando da Borsano	Bishop of Parma; 1412–1425	Succeeded by Bernardo Zambernelli
