= Silvio Cesare Bonicelli =

Italian bishop

- Bishop of Parma
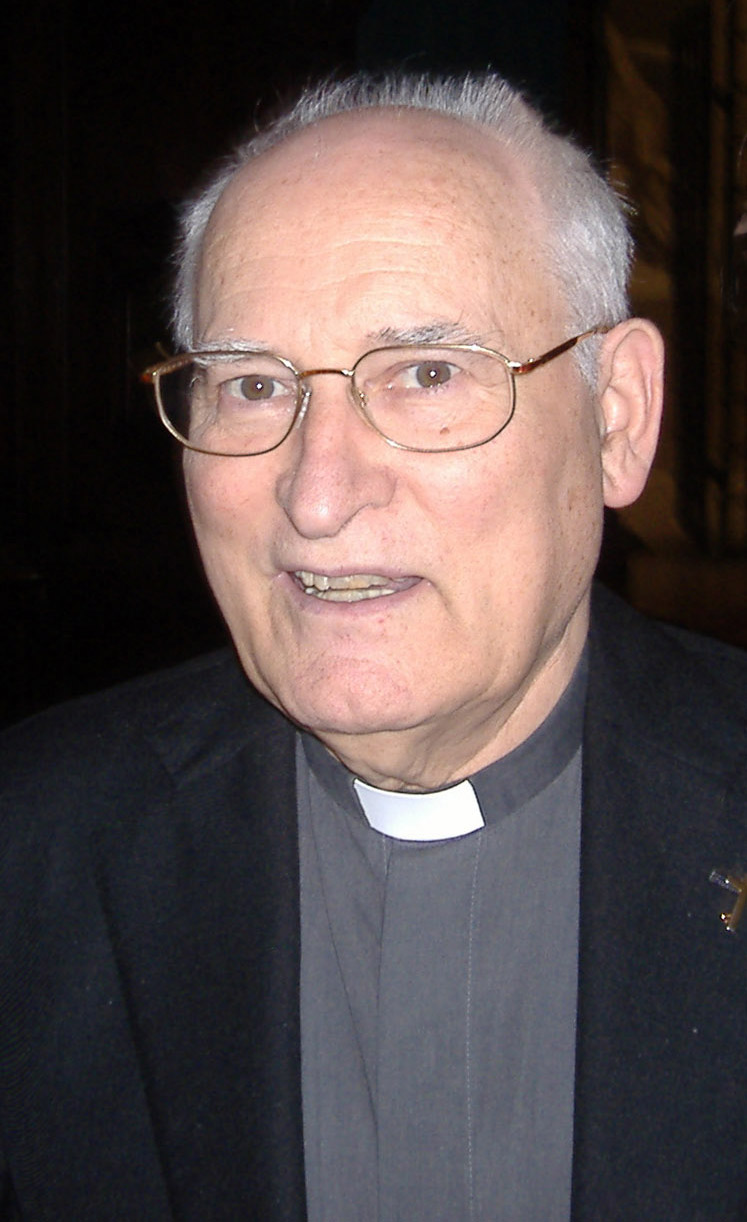
- Church: Catholic Church
- Diocese: Diocese of Parma
- In office: 13 December 1996 – 19 January 2008
- Predecessor: Benito Cocchi
- Successor: Enrico Solmi
- Previous post: Bishop of San Severo (1991-1996)

Orders
- Ordination: 16 June 1962 by Giuseppe Piazzi
- Consecration: 19 October 1991 by Andrea Mariano Magrassi

Personal details
- Born: 31 March 1932 Bergamo, Province of Bergamo, Kingdom of Italy
- Died: 6 March 2009 (aged 76) Bergamo, Lombardy, Italy

Silvio Cesare Bonicelli (31 March 1932 – 6 March 2009) was the Italian Bishop of the Roman Catholic Diocese of Parma from his appointment by Pope John Paul II on 13 December 1996 until his retirement on 19 January 2008.

Bonicelli was born in Bergamo, Italy. He obtained a degree in law in 1954 from the Università cattolica del Sacro Cuore in Milan. He was first ordained a Catholic priest on 16 June 1962. He previously served as the Bishop of the diocese of San Severo before being appointed to the diocese of Parma.

Bishop Silvio Cesare Bonicelli died in Bergamo on 6 March 2009, at the age of 76.

== Sources ==
- Bonicelli, Silvio Cesare (2007). Vescovo di Parma, 1997-2007: storia, riflessioni, immagini (in Italian). Fidenza: Mattioli. ISBN 978-88-6261-020-9.
- David M. Cheney, Catholic-hierarchy.org, Bishop Silvio Cesare Bonicelli; retrieved: 26 October 2018.
