= Tommaso Saladini =

17th-century Roman Catholic bishop

Most Reverend Tommaso Saladini
- Bishop of Parma
- Church: Catholic Church
- Diocese: Diocese of Parma
- In office: 1681–1694
- Predecessor: Carlo Nembrini
- Successor: Giuseppe Olgiati

Orders
- Consecration: 7 Jul 1681

Personal details
- Born: 1647 Ascoli Piceno, Italy
- Died: 21 Aug 1694 (age 47)

Tommaso Saladini or Saladino (1647–1694) was a Roman Catholic prelate who served as Bishop of Parma (1681–1694).

== Biography ==
Tommaso Saladini was born in Ascoli Piceno, Italy in 1647. On 23 June 1681, he was appointed during the papacy of Pope Innocent XI as Bishop of Parma. On 7 July 1681, he was consecrated bishop. He served as Bishop of Parma until his death on 21 August 1694.

== External links and additional sources ==
- Cheney, David M. "Diocese of Parma (-Fontevivo)". Catholic-Hierarchy.org. (for Chronology of Bishops) ^{[self-published]}
- Chow, Gabriel. "Diocese of Parma (Italy)". GCatholic.org. (for Chronology of Bishops) ^{[self-published]}

Catholic Church titles
| Preceded by Carlo Nembrini | Bishop of Parma; 1681–1694 | Succeeded by Giuseppe Olgiati |
