= Giuseppe Zandemaria =

Most Reverend Giuseppe Zandemaria
- Bishop of Piacenza
- Church: Catholic Church
- Diocese: Diocese of Piacenza
- In office: 1654–1681
- Predecessor: Alessandro Scappi
- Successor: Giorgio Barni

Orders
- Consecration: Jan 1655 by Pietro Vito Ottoboni

Personal details
- Died: 6 April 1681 Piacenza, Italy

Giuseppe Zandemaria (died 1681) was a Roman Catholic prelate who served as Bishop of Piacenza (1654–1681).

== Biography ==
On 9 Nov 1654, Giuseppe Zandemaria was appointed during the papacy of Pope Innocent X as Bishop of Piacenza. On Jan 1655, he was consecrated bishop by Pietro Vito Ottoboni, Bishop of Brescia. He served as Bishop of Piacenza until his death on 6 Apr 1681.

== External links and additional sources ==
- Cheney, David M. "Diocese of Piacenza-Bobbio". Catholic-Hierarchy.org. (for Chronology of Bishops) ^{[self-published]}
- Chow, Gabriel. "Diocese of Piacenza-Bobbio". GCatholic.org. (for Chronology of Bishops) ^{[self-published]}

Catholic Church titles
Preceded by Alessandro Scappi	Bishop of Piacenza; 1654–1681	Succeeded by Giorgio Barni
