= Sagramoro Sagramori =

15th-century Roman Catholic bishop

Most Reverend Sagramoro Sagramori
- Bishop of Parma
- Church: Catholic Church
- Diocese: Diocese of Parma
- In office: 1476–1482
- Predecessor: Jacopo-Antonio dalla Torre
- Successor: Gian Giacomo Schiaffinato
- Previous post: Bishop of Piacenza (1475–1476)

Personal details
- Died: 25 August 1482

Sagramoro Sagramori (died 1482) was a Roman Catholic prelate who served as Bishop of Parma (1476–1482) and Bishop of Piacenza (1475–1476).

== Biography ==
On 21 Oct 1475, Sagramoro Sagramori was appointed during the papacy of Pope Sixtus IV as Bishop of Piacenza. On 15 Jan 1476, he was appointed during the papacy of Pope Sixtus IV as Bishop of Parma. He served as Bishop of Parma until his death on 25 Aug 1482.

== External links and additional sources ==
- Cheney, David M. "Diocese of Piacenza-Bobbio". Catholic-Hierarchy.org. (for Chronology of Bishops) ^{[self-published]}
- Chow, Gabriel. "Diocese of Piacenza-Bobbio (Italy)". GCatholic.org. (for Chronology of Bishops) ^{[self-published]}
- Cheney, David M. "Diocese of Parma (-Fontevivo)". Catholic-Hierarchy.org. (for Chronology of Bishops) ^{[self-published]}
- Chow, Gabriel. "Diocese of Parma (Italy)". GCatholic.org. (for Chronology of Bishops) ^{[self-published]}

Catholic Church titles
Preceded by Michele Marliani	Bishop of Piacenza; 1475–1476	Succeeded by Fabrizio Marliani
Preceded by Jacopo-Antonio dalla Torre	Bishop of Parma; 1476–1482	Succeeded by Gian Giacomo Schiaffinato
