= Alessandro Rossi (bishop of Parma) =

Italian Roman Catholic prelate

Most Reverend Alessandro Rossi
- Bishop of Parma
- Church: Catholic Church
- Diocese: Diocese of Parma
- In office: 1614–1615
- Predecessor: Papirio Picedi
- Successor: Pompeo Cornazzano
- Previous post: Bishop of Castro del Lazio (1611–1614)

Orders
- Consecration: 24 February 1611 by Carlo Conti (cardinal)

Personal details
- Born: 1555
- Died: 24 March 1615 (age 60) Parma, Italy

Alessandro Rossi (1555–1615) was a Roman Catholic prelate who served as Bishop of Parma (1614–1615) and Bishop of Castro del Lazio (1611–1614).

== Biography ==
Alessandro Rossi was born in 1555. On 31 January 1611, he was appointed during the papacy of Pope Paul V as Bishop of Castro del Lazio. On 24 February 1611, he was consecrated bishop by Carlo Conti (cardinal), Bishop of Ancona e Numana, with Alessandro Guidiccioni (iuniore), Bishop of Lucca, and Giovanni Ambrogio Caccia, Bishop Emeritus of Castro del Lazio, serving as co-consecrators. On 9 July 1614, he was appointed during the papacy of Pope Paul V as Bishop of Parma. He served as Bishop of Parma until his death on 24 March 1615.

== External links and additional sources ==
- Cheney, David M. "Diocese of Castro (del Lazio)". Catholic-Hierarchy.org. (for Chronology of Bishops) ^{[self-published]}
- Chow, Gabriel. "Titular Episcopal See of Castro (Italy)". GCatholic.org. (for Chronology of Bishops) ^{[self-published]}
- Cheney, David M. "Diocese of Parma (-Fontevivo)". Catholic-Hierarchy.org. (for Chronology of Bishops) ^{[self-published]}
- Chow, Gabriel. "Diocese of Parma (Italy)". GCatholic.org. (for Chronology of Bishops) ^{[self-published]}

Catholic Church titles
Preceded by Giovanni Ambrogio Caccia	Bishop of Castro del Lazio; 1611–1614	Succeeded by Antonio Massa
Preceded by Papirio Picedi	Bishop of Parma; 1614–1615	Succeeded by Pompeo Cornazzano
