= Maurizio Galli =

Italian Roman Catholic bishop

Maurizio Galli (21 November 1932 − 1 June 2008) was an Italian Roman Catholic bishop.

== Career ==
Ordained to the priesthood in 1961, Galli was named bishop of Roman Catholic Diocese of Fidenza, Italy, in 1998 and resigned in 2007. On 2 May 1998 he received the episcopal consecration in the Cremona Cathedral by hand of then local bishop Giulio Nicolini and with the participation of Giulio Nicolini and Fiorino Tagliaferri as his co-consecrators.

On 28 June 2007 Galli received the honorary citizenship by the Major of Cremona. two days later, he resigned from the charge of ordinary bishop under the pressures of part of the Italian Episscopal Conference, becoming emeritus bishop in the same diocese. Some elements belonging to the Roman Catholic feared he could be affected by a degenerative mental illness.

== Death ==
In November he had a critical surgical intervention in Milan due to a brain cancer. He died at 8.15 a.m. on 1 June 2008 in the Handmaids of Charity of Cremona. The funeral was celebrated on 3 June 2008 in the Cremona Cathedral by the bishop Dante Lafranconi, with the participation of the following bishops: Carlo Mazza of Fidenza, Oscar Cantoni of Crema, Claudio Baggini of Vigevano, Roberto Busti of Mantua and Lino Pizzi of Forlì-Bertinoro. Subsequently, the remains were translated in Fidenza for the public worship and the cardinal Carlo Caffarra celebrated a second esequial Mass. Mgr. Galli was entombed in the Fidenza Cathedral crypt in the Arca dei Vescovi (Bishop's Arch), a sculptorial work of the cremonese Pietro Farraroni.

== Legacy ==
On 2 December 2009, in the Bonomelli Hall of the diocesan seminary of Cremona it was presented the book titled Maurizio Galli. Uomo d'eccellenza (Maurizio Galli, a man of excellence).
