= Alfonso Pozzi =

Roman Catholic prelate

Most Reverend Alfonso Pozzi
- Bishop of Borgo San Donnino
- Church: Catholic Church
- In office: 1620–1626
- Predecessor: Giovanni Linati
- Successor: Ranuccio Scotti Douglas

Orders
- Consecration: 5 April 1620 by Roberto Ubaldini

Personal details
- Born: 1582 Piacenza, Italy
- Died: 25 August 1626 (age 44) Borgo San Donnino, Italy

Alfonso Dal Pozzo Farnese or Thomas Pozzi (1582 – 25 August 1626) was a Roman Catholic prelate who served as Bishop of Borgo San Donnino (1620–1626).

== Biography ==
Alfonso Pozzi was born in Piacenza, Italy in 1582. On 30 March 1620, he was appointed during the papacy of Pope Paul V as Bishop of Borgo San Donnino. On 5 April 1620, he was consecrated bishop by Roberto Ubaldini, Bishop of Montepulciano, with Galeazzo Sanvitale, Archbishop Emeritus of Bari-Canosa, with Orazio Mattei, Bishop of Gerace, serving as co-consecrators. He served as Borgo San Donnino until his death on 25 August 1626.

== External links and additional sources ==
- Cheney, David M. "Diocese of Fidenza". Catholic-Hierarchy.org. (for Chronology of Bishops) ^{[self-published]}
- Chow, Gabriel. "Diocese of Fidenza (Italy)". GCatholic.org. (for Chronology of Bishops) ^{[self-published]}

Catholic Church titles
Preceded by Giovanni Linati	Bishop of Borgo San Donnino; 1620–1626	Succeeded by Ranuccio Scotti Douglas
