= Giovanni Giacomo Sclafenati =

Italian cardinal

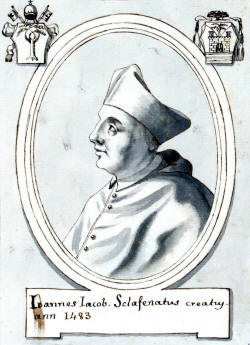
Giovanni Giacomo Sclafenati

Giovanni Giacomo Sclafenati (Schiaffinati) (10 September 1451 – 9 December 1497) was an Italian cardinal of the Catholic Church. He was bishop of Parma in Italy.

He was made cardinal on 15 November 1483 by Pope Sixtus IV.

Cardinal Sclafenati died in Rome on 8 December 1497 at the age of 47, and was buried in S. Agostino.

== Bibliography ==
- Allodi, Giorgio M. (1856). Serie cronologica dei vescovi di Parma con alcuni cenni sui principali avvenimenti civili (in Italian). Vol. 1. Parma: P. Fiaccadori.
- Allodi, Giovanni Maria (1856). Serie cronologica dei vescovi di Parma con alcuni cenni sui principali avvenimenti civili (in Italian). Vol. II. Parma: P. Fiaccadori. pp. 811–824.
- Cardella, Lorenzo (1793). Memorie storiche de' cardinali della santa Romana chiesa (in Italian). Vol. Tomo secondo (2). Roma: nella stamperia Pagliarini. pp. 251–252.
- Eubel, Conradus, ed. (1914). Hierarchia catholica (in Latin). Vol. Tomus 2 (second ed.). Münster: Libreria Regensbergiana.

Catholic Church titles
| Preceded by Sagramoro Sagramori | Bishop of Parma; 1482–1497 | Succeeded by Stefano Taverna |
| Preceded by Jean Rolin | Cardinal-Priest of Santo Stefano al Monte Celio; 1483–1484 | Succeeded by Jaime de Casanova |
| Preceded by Giovanni Battista Cibò | Cardinal-Priest of Santa Cecilia; 1484–1497 | Succeeded by Lorenzo Cibo de' Mari |
