= Diocese of Parma =

Roman Catholic diocese in Italy

Diocese of Parma Dioecesis Parmensis

Catholic
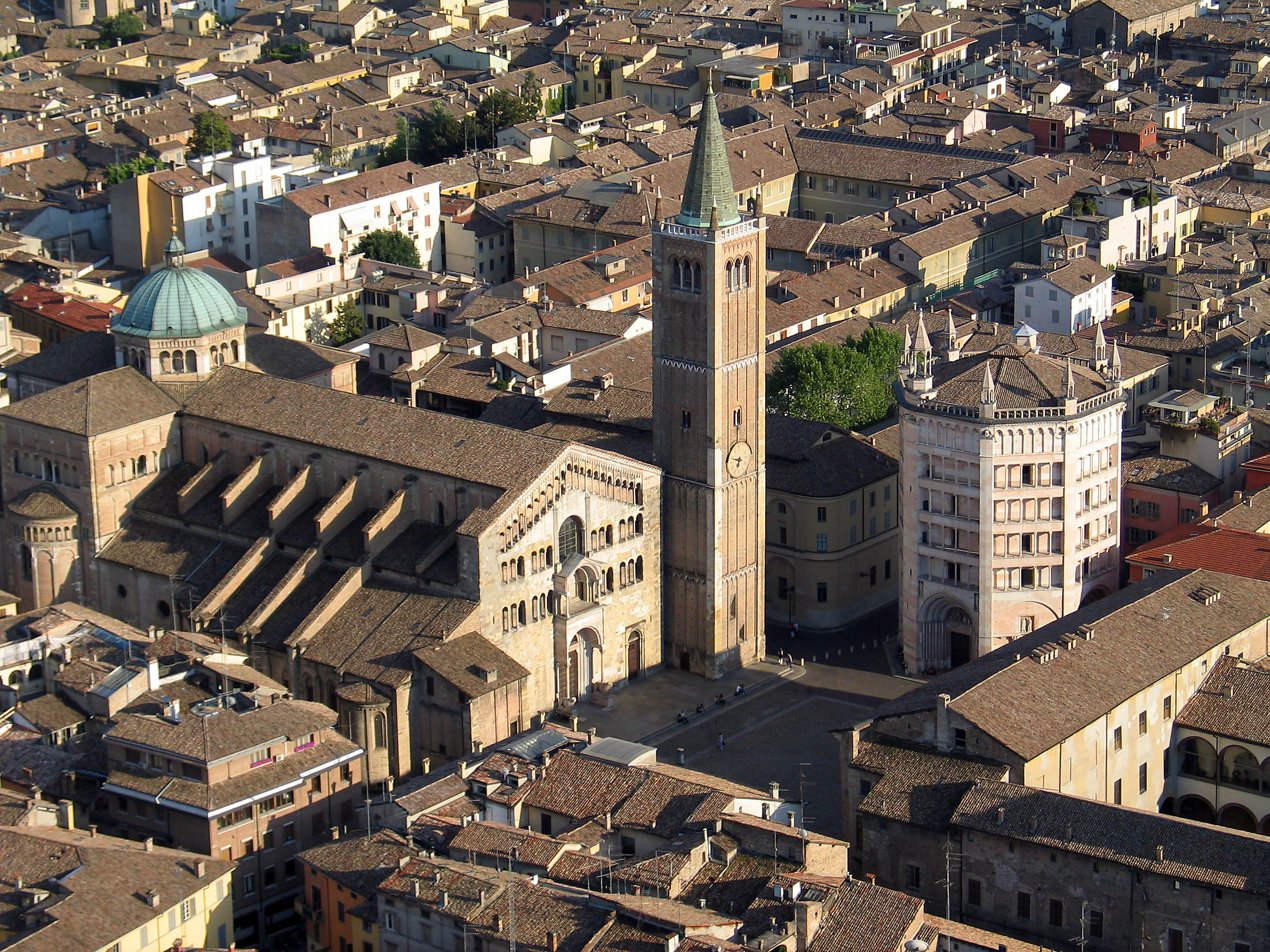
- Parma Cathedral

Location
- Country: Italy
- Ecclesiastical province: Modena-Nonantola

Statistics
- Area: 2,100 km^{2} (810 sq mi)
- Population: Total; Catholics: (as of 2026); 375,585 ▲; 296,940 ▲ (79.1%)
- Parishes: 308 ▼

Information
- Denomination: Catholic Church
- Rite: Roman Rite
- Established: 4th century
- Cathedral: Basilica Cattedrale della Assunzione di Maria Virgine
- Secular priests: 121 diocesan ▼102 (Religious Orders) ▼32 Permanent Deacons ▲

Current leadership
- Pope: Leo XIV
- Bishop: Enrico Solmi

Map
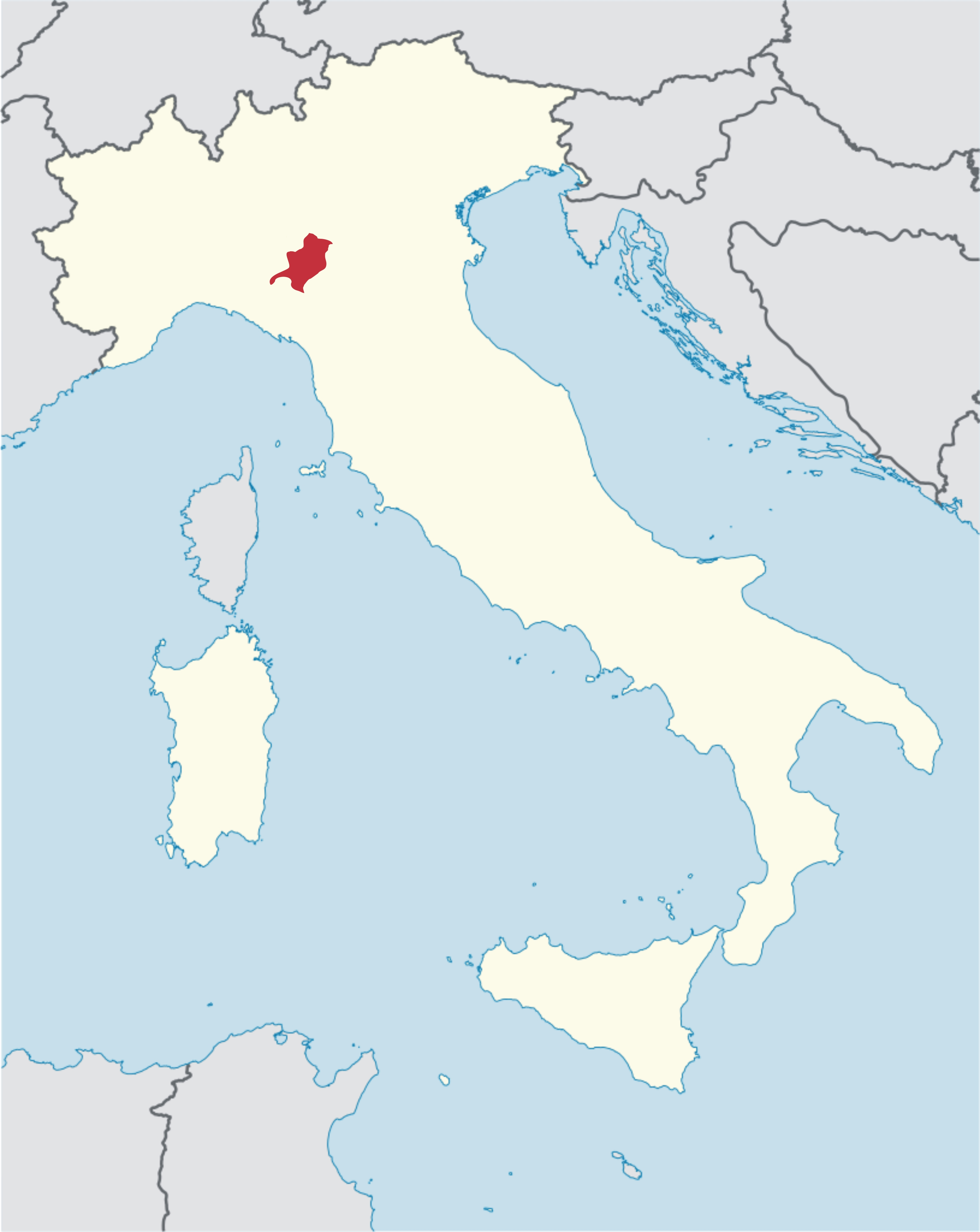

Website
- www.diocesi.parma.it

The Diocese of Parma (Latin: Dioecesis Parmensis) is a Latin diocese of the Catholic Church. It has properly been called Diocese of Parma-Fontevivo since 1892. The bishop's seat is in Parma Cathedral. The diocese is a suffragan of the Archdiocese of Modena-Nonantola.

Originally the diocese of Parma was in the ecclesiastical province of Milan, but it subsequently became a suffragan of the Archbishop of Ravenna. In 1106, Pope Paschal II removed Parma from the supervision of Ravenna, but in 1119 Pope Gelasius II restored the dioceses of Emilia to the jurisdiction of Ravenna. With the creation of the new archdiocese of Bologna in 1593, Parma became subject to Bologna. In 1875, the diocese of Parma became immediately subject to the Holy See (papacy).

== History ==
At Easter 967, Bishop Uberto of Parma attended a council at Ravenna, presided over by Pope John XIII and the Emperor Otto I. The council deposed Archbishop Herold of Salzburg for heresy. The emperor confirmed the pope in the possession of all of the territories of the Roman church, including the exarchate of Ravenna. The pope raised the diocese of Magdeburg to the status of an archbishopric at the emperor's request. He also confirmed the privileges of the Church of Ferrara.

In 987, Archbishop Honestus (Onesto) of Ravenna summoned a provincial synod, to meet in the village of Marzaglia, in the diocese of Parma. The bishops who attended included Giovanni of Imola, Gerardo of Faenza, Odone of Cesena, Ulberto of Bologna, Sigolfo of Piacenza, and Uberto of Parma. The assembly dealt with complaints made by the bishop of Bologna against the bishop of Parma, claiming that Bishop Uberto was holding properties close to Bologna which ought to belong to Bologna, which was a poor diocese and unable to staff all of its churches. Archbishop Onesto was able to effect a reconciliation through the mutual exchange of disputed properties.

On 24 April 1046, Cadalo, the new bishop of Parma, and his family, who were established in the diocese of Verona, created and endowed a new monastery, that of S. Giorgio, in Breida, near Verona. Bishop Cadalo held a diocesan synod in 1061. He was in schism with Pope Alexander II, and counted all of Lombardy in his camp except for territories belonging to Countess Matilda of Tuscany.

In 1410 the plague struck Parma with particular virulence. It is claimed that one-quarter of the population died.

=== Apostolic visitation ===
In accordance with a bull of Pope Gregory XIII of 14 September 1578, Archbishop Giambattista Castelli of Rimini began an apostolic visitation of the diocese of Parma. His first investigation was of the cathedral chapter, where he discovered that four of the priests whose duty it was to celebrate Mass in the cathedral were not able to recite the prayer Suscipiat Dominus from the canon of the Mass. Then the archbishop turned to an inspection of the canons of the cathedral chapter. He cited the decree of the Council of Trent de reformatione (chapter 12), approved in the 24th Session, which granted their daily stipend from the chapter's income only to those who had attended at each of the canonical hours. The canons replied that their observances had to be modified because the great plague of 1348 had been responsible for a scarcity of clergy, necessitating only attendance at the daily Mass and at the Vespers on the eve of a great feast day. Touching as it did both on local tradition and the canons' income, the archbishop's ruling set off a legal firestorm.

The canons lodged an appeal in Rome with the prefect of the Sacred Congregation of the Council, Cardinal Marcantonio Maffei. They sent Cesare Picolello and Francesco Ballestrieri, armed with a testimonial letter of the elders of the Commune of 9 January 1579, stating that the people of Parma were content with the celebration of the canonical hours in the cathedral. Cardinal Alessandro Sforza was induced to speak with Maffei, and the congregation took up the appeal on 29 January 1579, in the presence of twelve cardinals, nine of whom voted in favor of the canons of Parma, ruling that the canons' service was not in violation of the decrees of the Council of Trent. The pope was informed of the decision and gave his approval.

In 1580, on the initiative of Duke Ottavio, the Jesuits were introduced into Parma, and given the church of San Benedetto, which had belonged to the abbey of S. Giovanni Evangelista. They continued to use the church until the reign of Pope Clement IX. They also acquired the Oratory of S. Rocco. By 1618, the Jesuits had a college for high school students, and one-third of the twenty-six professors at the University of Parma were Jesuits.

=== Cathedral and chapter ===
The residence of the canons of the chapter of the cathedral of Parma (Canonica) was established on 29 December 877 by Bishop Wibodus and King Carloman.

The cathedral of Parma, which had been constructed with substantial aid from the countess Matilda of Tuscany, was consecrated by Pope Paschal II on 31 October 1106.

On 3 January 1116 began a series of earthquakes in the neighborhood of Parma, which lasted for thirty days. In 1117 another major earthquake destroyed the cathedral of Parma.

The baptistry of the cathedral was dedicated on 25 May 1270 by Bishop Opizzo de Sancto Vitale.

The largest bell of the cathedral, named "Bajonus", was given by Cardinal Gerardo Bianchi in 1291.

On 8 January 1584, the high altar of the cathedral was consecrated by Bishop Ferrante Farnese.

In 1691, the cathedral was staffed by a chapter composed of three dignities (the archdeacon, archpriest, and provost) and fourteen canons. In 1579, the residence of the canons was at the monastery of S. Giovanni Evangelista in Parma, directly behind the apse of the cathedral.

The cathedral was awarded the status of a minor basilica by Pope Gregory XVI in a bull of 13 June 1834.

=== Synods ===
On 28–30 September 1466, a diocesan synod took place, presided over by the vicar general Avinatri, with a special mandate from Bishop Giovanni (Giacomo) Antonio della Torre (1463–1476). The opening Mass was celebrated by della Torre's auxiliary bishop, Agostino. The statutes of the earlier synods of Bishops Obizzo Sanvitale (1257–1295), Papiniano della Rovere (1300–1316), and Delfino della Pergola (1425–1463), were read out. Bishop della Torre held a second synod in March 1470.

In 1564 Bishop Alessandro Sforza (1560–1573) presided over the first diocesan synod following the close of the Council of Trent. In 1568 he took part in the provincial synod of the ecclesiastical province of Ravenna, presided over by Cardinal Giulio della Rovere. Bishop Ferrante Farnese (1573–1606) held a diocesan synod in 1575, another on 11 May 1581, and a third in 1583.

A diocesan synod was held in September 1602 under the presidency of Giovanni Mozanega, protonotary apostolic and vicar general of the diocese of Parma. Bishop Pompeo Cornazzano, O.Cist. (1615–1647) held a diocesan synod in November 1621. Bishop Carlo Nembrini (1652–1677) presided over his first diocesan synod on 5–7 June 1659; he held his second diocesan synod on 26–27 April 1674. A synod was held on 7 May 1691 by Bishop Tommaso Saladino (1681–1694).

Bishop Domenico Maria Villa (1872–1882) presided over a diocesan synod on 1–3 October 1878.

== Bishops ==
=== to 1100 ===
- Urbanus (attested 378)
- Gratiosus (680)

...

- Alboin (attested 744)
- Gerolamo (attested c. 775)
- Pietro (attested 781)

...

- Lantpertus (Lambertus) (attested 827 – after 835)
- Wibodus (attested 857–895)
- Elbungus (895 – after 915)
- Aicardus (attested 920–927)
- Sigefredus (attested May 929 – after 944)
- Adeodatus (attested 947 – after 953)
- Obertus (attested from 961 – December 980)
- Sigefredus (980-after 1006)
- Maiolo (attested c. 1013/1014)
- Enrico (1015-after February 1026)
- Ugo (before April 1027 – after April 1040)
- Cadalo (1046–1071)
- Everard (1073–c. 1085)
- Wido (1085–c. 1104)

=== 1100 to 1500 ===
- Bernardo degli Uberti (1106–1133)
- Alberto (1133–1135)

...

- Lanfranco (1139-c. 1162)
- Aicardo da Cornazzano (c. 1163–1167 or 1170)
- Bernardo (c. 1172–1194)
- Obizzo Fieschi (1194–1224)
- Gratia (1224–1236)
- Gregorius (1236)
- Martinus (1237–1243)
- Bernardus Viti (Da Vizio) de Scotti
- Alberto Sanvitale (1243–1257)
- Obizzo Sanvitale (1257–1295)
- Giovanni da Castell'Arquato, O.Cist. (1295–1299)
- Goffredo da Vezzano (1299–1300)
- Papiniano della Rovere (1300–1316)
- Simone Saltarelli, O.P. (1317–1323)
- Ugolino de' Rossi (1323–1377)
- Beltrando da Borsano (c. 1378-c. 1380)
- Giovanni Rusconi (1380–1412)
- Bernardo Zambernelli, O.F.M. Conv. (1412–1425)
- Delfino della Pergola (1425–1463)
- Giovanni Antonio della Torre (1463–1476)
- Sagramoro Sagramori (1476–1482)
- Cardinal Giovanni Giacomo Sclafenati (1482–1497)

=== 1500 to 1800 ===
- Giovanni Antonio Sangiorgio (1499–1509)
- Alessandro Farnese (1509–1534)
- Cardinal Alessandro Farnese (1534–1535)
- Guido Ascanio Sforza di Santa Fiora (1535–1560)
- Alessandro Sforza (1560–1573)
- Ferrante Farnese (1573–1606)
- Papirio Picedi (1606–1614)
- Alessandro Rossi (1614–1615)
- Pompeo Cornazzano, O.Cist. (1615–1647)

Sede vacante (1647–1650)

- Gerolamo Corio (1650–1651)
- Carlo Nembrini (1652–1677)
- Tommaso Saladino (1681–1694)
- Giuseppe Olgiati (1694–1711)
- Camillo Marazzani (1711–1760)
- Francesco Pettorelli Lalatta (1760–1788)
- Adeodato Turchi, O.F.M.Cap. (1788)

=== since 1800 ===
- Cardinal Carlo Francesco Caselli (1804–1828)
- Remigio Crescini, O.S.B. (1828–1830)
- Vitale Loschi (1831 -1842)
- Giovanni Tommaso Neuschel, O.P. (1843–1852) (resigned)
- Felice Cantimorri, O.F.M.Cap. (1854–1870)
- Domenico Maria Villa (1872–1882)
- Giovanni Andrea Miotti (1882–1893)
- Francesco Magani (1893–1907)
- Guido Maria Conforti (1907–1931)
- Evasio Colli (1932–1971)
- Amilcare Pasini (1971–1981) (resigned)
- Benito Cocchi (1982–1996)
- Silvio Cesare Bonicelli (1996–2008)
- Enrico Solmi (2008–present)

== See also ==
- Timeline of Parma

== Books ==
=== Reference works for bishops ===
- Gams, Pius Bonifatius (1873). Series episcoporum Ecclesiae catholicae: quotquot innotuerunt a beato Petro apostolo (in Latin). Ratisbon: Typis et Sumptibus Georgii Josephi Manz. pp. 744–745.
- Eubel, Conradus, ed. (1913). Hierarchia catholica (in Latin). Vol. Tomus 1 (second ed.). Münster: Libreria Regensbergiana. (in Latin)
- Eubel, Conradus, ed. (1914). Hierarchia catholica (in Latin). Vol. Tomus 2 (second ed.). Münster: Libreria Regensbergiana.
- Eubel, Conradus; Gulik, Guilelmus, eds. (1923). Hierarchia catholica (in Latin). Vol. Tomus 3 (second ed.). Münster: Libreria Regensbergiana.
- Gauchat, Patritius (Patrice) (1935). Hierarchia catholica. Vol. Tomus IV (1592–1667). Münster: Libraria Regensbergiana.
- Ritzler, Remigius; Sefrin, Pirminus (1952). Hierarchia catholica medii et recentis aevi. Vol. Tomus V (1667–1730). Patavii: Messagero di S. Antonio.
- Ritzler, Remigius; Sefrin, Pirminus (1958). Hierarchia catholica medii et recentis aevi. Vol. Tomus VI (1730–1799). Patavii: Messagero di S. Antonio.
- Ritzler, Remigius; Sefrin, Pirminus (1968). Hierarchia Catholica medii et recentioris aevi (in Latin). Vol. VII (1800–1846). Monasterii: Libreria Regensburgiana.
- Remigius Ritzler; Pirminus Sefrin (1978). Hierarchia catholica Medii et recentioris aevi (in Latin). Vol. VIII (1846–1903). Il Messaggero di S. Antonio.
- Pięta, Zenon (2002). Hierarchia catholica medii et recentioris aevi (in Latin). Vol. IX (1903–1922). Padua: Messagero di San Antonio. ISBN 978-88-250-1000-8.

=== Studies ===
- Affò, Ireneo (1793). Storia della città di Parma (in Italian). Vol. Tomo secondo. Parma: Carmignani. [prints documents]
- Affò, Ireneo (1793). Storia della città di Parma (in Italian). Vol. Tomo Terzo. Parma: Carmignani.
- Affò, Ireneo (1795). Storia della città di Parma (in Italian). Vol. Tomo quatro. Parma: Carmignani.
- Allodi, Giorgio M. (1856). Serie cronologica dei vescovi di Parma con alcuni cenni sui principali avvenimenti civili (in Italian). Vol. I. Parma: P. Fiaccadori.
- Allodi, Giovanni Maria (1856). Serie cronologica dei vescovi di Parma con alcuni cenni sui principali avvenimenti civili (in Italian). Vol. II. Parma: P. Fiaccadori.
- Barbieri, L., ed. (1866). Ordinarium ecclesiae Parmensis e vestustioribus excerptum reformatum a. MCCCCXVII (in Latin). Parma: Fiaccadori.
- Cappelletti, Giuseppe (1859). Le chiese d'Italia: dalla loro origine sino ai nostri giorni (in Italian). Vol. Tomo decimoquinto (15). Venezia: G. Antonelli. pp. 91–187.
- Chronicon Parmense. Monumenta historica ad provincias Parmensem et et Placentinam pertinenti, Volume 5a (in Latin). Parma: ex officina P. Fiaccadori. 1855.
- Ferdinand Gregorovius (1896). History of the City of Rome in the Middle Ages. Vol. IV, part 1. London: G. Bell. [Henry III, Pope Nicholas II, Bishop Cadalo: pp. 102–147].
- Kehr, Paul Fridolin (1906). Italia Pontificia Vol. V: Aemilia, sive Provincia Ravennas. Berlin: Weidmann, pp. 412–440. (in Latin).
- Lanzoni, Francesco (1927). Le diocesi d'Italia dalle origini al principio del secolo VII (an. 604). Faenza: F. Lega, pp. 803–810. (in Italian)
- Manfredi, Angelo (1999). Vescovi, clero e cura pastorale: studi sulla diocesi di Parma alla fine dell'Ottocento (in Italian). Roma: Editrice pontificia Universita Gregoriana. ISBN 978-88-7652-835-4.
- Pelicelli, Nestore (1936). I vescovi della Chiesa parmense (in Italian). Parma: Officina Grafica Fresching.
- Stroll, Mary (2011). Popes and Antipopes: The Politics of Eleventh Century Church Reform. Leiden-Boston: Brill. ISBN 978-90-04-21701-0.
- Ughelli, Ferdinando; Coleti, Niccolò (1717). Italia sacra sive De Episcopis Italiae, et insularum adjacentium (in Latin). Vol. Tomus II. Venice: apud Sebastianum Coleti. pp. 140–194.
