= Diocese of Piacenza–Bobbio =

Roman Catholic diocese in Italy

Diocese of Piacenza-Bobbio Dioecesis Placentina-Bobiensis

Catholic
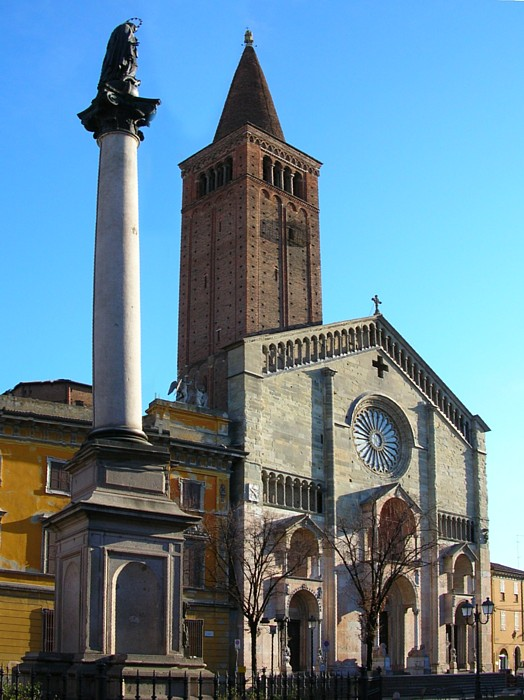
- The Romanesque façade of the Duomo of Piacenza

Location
- Country: Italy
- Ecclesiastical province: Modena–Nonantola

Statistics
- Area: 3,716 km^{2} (1,435 sq mi)
- Population: Total; Catholics: (as of 2023); 322,512 ▼; 287,658 ▼ (89.2%)
- Parishes: 418 ▼

Information
- Denomination: Catholic Church
- Rite: Roman Rite
- Established: 4th Century
- Cathedral: Basilica Cattedrale di S. Giustina e S. Maria Assunta (Piacenza)
- Co-cathedral: Concattedrale dell’Assunzione di Nostra Signora Maria (Bobbio)
- Secular priests: 187 ▼ (diocesan); 8 ▲ (Religious Orders); 55 Permanent Deacons ▲

Current leadership
- Pope: Leo XIV
- Bishop: Adriano Cevolotto
- Bishops emeritus: Gianni Ambrosio

Website
- www.diocesipiacenzabobbio.it

The Diocese of Piacenza-Bobbio (Latin: Dioecesis Placentina-Bobiensis) is a Latin diocese of the Catholic Church in northern Italy. It has existed since 1989. It is a suffragan of the Archdiocese of Modena-Nonantola. The historic Diocese of Piacenza was combined with the territory of the diocese of Bobbio-San Colombano, which was briefly united with the archdiocese of Genoa.

== History ==
An early martyr, St. Antonius (or Antoninus, as the diocese prefers), is said to have belonged to the Theban Legion, and to have suffered martyrdom at Piacenza in the second or third century. He has no "Passion", however, and the ninth century document that makes him a member of the Theban legion is pieno di favole ('full of fables').

The Lombards took possession of Piacenza at the beginning of their invasion and thereafter it remained in their power. Piacenza was originally a suffragan (subordinate, as part of the ecclesiastical province) of Milan. Bishop Majorianus was one of the bishops who attended the synod of Milan called by Archbishop Eusebius in 451. Piacenza was certainly suffragan to Ravenna by the time of the Roman synod of 680.

=== Bishop Soffredus ===
In 865, after twenty-five years of service in Piacenza, Bishop Soffredus (Seufredus) found himself driven from his office by the treachery of his own nephew, the deacon Paulus. Eager for power, Paulus usurped the episcopal seat, and styled himself Paulus vocatus Episcopus sanctae Placentinae ecclesiae. Pope Nicholas I immediately wrote to the Emperor Louis II, demanding to know whether there was any crime charged against Soffredus, or any incapacity, that made his removal necessary; and pointing out that such problems were normally directed to the metropolitan, or if they were serious enough, to the pope himself. Pope Nicholas then ordered the Emperor to restore Soffredus to his episcopal seat. At the same time, through his legates, Pope Nicholas had Soffredus restored to his seat. Paulus was forbidden to attempt such a thing ever again, or to seek the bishopric. Nonetheless, on the death of Soffredus in 870, Paulus, who had evidently been restored to favor and was serving as Archdeacon of Piacenza, was elected bishop in his place.

The temporal power was in the hands of the bishops from the ninth century until the twelfth century, when the town became a commune governed by consuls and later (1188) by a podestà.

The Bishop of Piacenza was first referred to as bishop and count in 1065.

=== Bishop Sigulf ===
During the last six years of his administration, Bishop Sigulfus (951–988) enjoyed the services of a coadjutor-bishop, Johannes Philagathos, who, thanks to the patronage of the Empress Theophano, was also Abbot of the Monastery of Nonantola and tutor of the child who would become the Emperor Otto III. When Sigulfus died, Joannes began to sign himself Archiepiscopus Sancte Placentine Ecclesie. The diocese of Piacenza had been detached from the ecclesiastical province of Ravenna, through the influence of the Regent Theophano and with the consent of Pope John XV, and erected into an archdiocese directly dependent upon the Papacy. In 1095, the Archbishop and Archbishop Bernard of Würzburg were sent to Constantinople to attempt to arrange for the marriage of a Byzantine princess and the new Emperor Otto III. On their return Joannes was drawn into Roman politics by Crescentius II Nomentanus, who had just engineered a coup-d'état against Pope Gregory V. Archbishop Joannes found himself named pope (or rather antipope) in February or March 997, under the name John XVI. The Emperor, however, was not pleased that Pope Gregory V, his cousin Otto of Carinthia, had been expelled from Rome. He summoned a synod at Pavia, which anathematized Crescentius and John XVI. Piacenza received a new bishop, the Benedictine Sigifredus. The title of archbishop was withdrawn, and the diocese of Piacenza was returned to the metropolitanate of Ravenna. Its time as an independent archdiocese had lasted from 988 to 997.

On 21 October 1106, Pope Paschal II, at the Council of Guastalla, removed the dioceses of Emilia from the metropolitanate of Ravenna, and made them directly dependent upon the Holy See (papacy). This action was in punishment for the schism carried on by Archbishop Wibert of Ravenna (Antipope Clement III), in concert with the Emperor Henry IV. On 7 August 1118, Pope Gelasius II withdrew Pope Paschal's order, and returned the dioceses to the metropolitanate of Ravenna; his decision was confirmed by Pope Calixtus II in 1121, and in 1125 by Pope Honorius II. Bishop Arduinus of Piacenza (1119?–1147), however, resisted efforts of the popes and the Archbishop of Ravenna to return his diocese to suffragan status. On 29 March 1148, Pope Eugene III wrote to Archbishop Moyses of Ravenna that he had approved the election of Bishop Joannes of Piacenza. On 9 November 1148, however, he wrote to Bishop-elect Joannes, ordering him to have himself consecrated by the Archbishop of Ravenna. After resisting for more than two years, Giovanni finally submitted to the Pope's order, and was consecrated by the Archbishop of Ravenna on 3 July 1151.

The people of Piacenza did not let the matter rest. They solicited the intervention of Abbot Peter the Venerable of Cluny, informing him of their point of view, that their metropolitan was the pope, not the Archbishops of Aquileia or Ravenna. They noted that Urban II and Calixtus II had consecrated their bishops. In 1155, with a new Pope, Adrian IV and a new bishop of Piacenza, Ugo Pierleoni, the matter was raised again, and Adrian issued a bull exempting Bishop Ugo from subjection to Ravenna, while at the same time claiming an inability to decide the issue between Ravenna and Piacenza. In March 1179, Bishop Tedaldo was present at the Third Lateran Council in Rome, and he subscribed along with the bishops directly dependent upon the Holy See (papacy), not with the suffragans of Ravenna.

=== Suffragan of Bologna, then Genoa ===
In 1582 the diocese of Bologna was raised to the status of a metropolitan archbishopric. Piacenza was made a suffragan of the Archdiocese of Bologna by Pope Gregory XIII in the bull Universi orbis of 10 December 1582.

In 1806, in accordance with faculties specially granted to him by Pope Pius VII on 5 April 1806, Cardinal Giovanni Battista Caprara removed the dioceses of Piacenza, San Donnino, and Parma from the jurisdiction of the metropolitan Archdiocese of Bologna, and attached them to the Archdiocese of Genoa. On 30 March 1818, Pope Pius VII removed the same three dioceses from the jurisdiction of the metropolitan Archdiocese of Genoa, and made them directly dependent upon the Holy See.

The current bishop is Adriano Cevolotto.

=== Pope Urban II ===
Pope Urban II visited Piacenza from 1 March to 5 April 1095, and held a synod there from 1–7 March. It is said that more than 4,000 clerics and 3,000 laypersons were present. Archbishop Hugh of Lyon was suspended from office because he was not in attendance and had offered no excuse. The Emperor Henry IV and his antipope Wibert of Ravenna (Clement III) were again excommunicated, and Wibert's bestowal of holy orders since his excommunication were annulled. The ambassador of the Emperor Alexios I Komnenos made another public appeal for assistance against the Muslims. Simony was again condemned, as was clerical concubinage. Berengar of Tours was condemned for his heretical views on the subject of transubstantiation. The dates for the observance of the Quattuor tempora were fixed.

People from Piacenza took part in the First Crusade.

=== Bishop Sega ===
When Bishop Filippo Sega (1578–1596) was appointed Bishop of Piacenza, he was not even in Italy. He was in Spain, acting as Pope Gregory XIII's Nuncio to the court of King Philip II of Spain. He was already a bishop, the second Bishop of Ripatransone. He continued as Nuncio in Spain until the end of 1581, and did not enter Piacenza until the Spring of 1582. After little more than a year in the diocese, he was again appointed papal Nuncio to Spain on 20 September 1583, and, due to a serious illness at the end of the mission, which incapacitated him for five months in Barcelona, he did not return to Piacenza until June 1584.

A new pope, Sixtus V, who had heard of his reforming efforts in his diocese, summoned him to Rome and appointed him, on 24 April 1585, one of the Reformers of the clergy and clerical institutions of the city of Rome. His tenure was not long, however, for the Pope appointed him Nuncio to the Holy Roman Emperor Rudolf II in Vienna on 18 January 1586, a post which he held until 28 May 1587. On his return, during his second period of residence, he further advanced the reforms mandated by the Council of Trent, and held a diocesan synod on 3–5 May 1589.

He was summoned back to Rome following the assassination of Henry III of France on 3 August 1589, and was sent as Nuncio on Cardinal Enrico Caetani's legantine mission to France. He was made a cardinal in 1591 and replaced Caetani as Legate in 1592. He did not return to Italy until the summer of 1594, when he took up his duties at the Papal Curia in Rome.

A beneficial side-effect of the Bishop's frequent absences was that Piacenza did not fall under subordination (suffragan status) to any of the neighboring metropolitanates. The Council of Trent had decreed that every bishop should attend regular provincial synods, and that those bishops who were directly dependent upon the Holy See (the pope) should choose a provincial synod to attend. Cardinal Carlo Borromeo of Milan was especially enthusiastic for Tridentine reform, and held frequent diocesan and provincial synods, inviting the bishops of Piacenza to the latter. They either attended under the stipulation that no suffragan status was implied or created, or declined to appear. Borromeo even tried to get the Cathedral Chapter of Piacenza to send a delegation, but they too declined, on the grounds that cathedral chapters were not members of a provincial council. Sega, who was engaged in diplomatic activities, was unable to respond to an invitation (or a summons) to Borromeo's 5th (1579) or 6th (1582) synod; Borromeo had intended to hold a 7th in 1585, but he died in the meantime, and the matter lapsed. The 7th provincial synod of Milan finally took place in 1609, and Bishop Rangoni of Piacenza did not attend. The archbishop of Ravenna also tried to summon Piacenza, in 1582, and his effort too failed.

=== Cathedral and Chapter ===
The construction of the original cathedral was attributed to Bishop Victor, the first bishop known by name, and was dedicated to Saint Antoninus. It was referred to as the Victorana Ecclesia. A new building was constructed by Bishop Seufridus (839–870), and dedicated to the Virgin Mary and Saint Justina, possibly Justina of Padua or perhaps Justina of Antioch, both of whose stories are fictional. The second cathedral was completed by Bishop Paulus (870– c. 885), and some remains of Justina were given to the cathedral by Bishop Joannes Philagathos the Antipope John XVI (982–997). The cathedral was ruined in the great earthquake of 1117 and was completely rebuilt beginning in 1122. It is claimed, in the Chronocle of Piacenza, that the cathedral was dedicated by Pope Calixtus II on 23 October 1123, but, as Paul Fridolin Kehr has pointed out, Calixtus visited Piacenza in April 1120, while on the alleged consecration day he was in Benevento.

In 1747, the Chapter had six dignities (including the Archdeacon, the Provost, the Vicedominus, the Archpriest, the Dean, and the Primicerius) and thirty Canons.

=== Synods ===
A diocesan synod was an irregular but important meeting of the bishop of a diocese and his clergy. Its purpose was (1) to proclaim generally the various decrees already issued by the bishop; (2) to discuss and ratify measures on which the bishop chose to consult with his clergy; (3) to publish statutes and decrees of the diocesan synod, of the provincial synod, and of the Holy See.

Bishop Albericus Visconti (1295–1301) held a diocesan synod in Piacenza on 19 February 1298. The "Acts" survive, and were published by Pietro Maria Campi in 1662. Among other things, it ordered clerici concubinarii (clergy with wives) to leave their houses within eight days of the publication of the synodical decrees, and not to take their children with them.

Cardinal Paolo Burali conducted a synod on 27 August 1570, and a second synod on 2 September 1574. On 3–5 May 1589, a diocesan synod was held by Bishop Filippo Sega. Bishop Claudio Rangoni (1596–1619) presided at a diocesan synod on 11 November 1599. He held another synod in 1613. Bishop Alexandre Scappi (1627–1653) presided over a diocesan synod on 3–5 May 1632. He held his second synod on 8–10 November 1646. A diocesan synod was held on 12–14 May 1677 by Bishop Giuseppe Zandemaria. Bishop Giorgio Barni (1688–1731) presided over a diocesan synod on 4–6 June 1696. He held a second synod in 1725.

== Bishops ==
=== to 1300 ===
- Victor (attested 355, 372)
- Sabinus (Savino)

...

- Majorianus (attested 451)
- Avitus (456–457)
- Placitus
- Silvanus

...

- Joannes (attested 603)

...

- Thomas (737)

...

- Desiderius
- Julianus
- Podo (808–839)
- Seufridus (839–870)
- Paulus (870– c. 885)
- Maurus (c. 885–890)
- Bernardus (890– c. 892)
- Everardus (c. 892–903)
- Guido, O.S.B. (904–940)
- Boso (940–951)
- Sigulfus (attested 952, 973, 982)
- Johannes Philagathos, O.S.B. (982–997)
- Sigifredus (997–1031)
- Pietro (1031)
- Aicardus (1038–1040)
- Ivo (1040–1045)
- Guido (1045–1049)
- Dionisio (1049–1075)
- Bonizo (1088)
- Widrich (Withricus) (1091–1095)
- Aldo (Addo) (1096–1118)
- Arduinus (1119?–1147)
- Joannes (1147–1155)
- Ugo Pierleoni (1155–1166)
- Tedaldo (Theobaldus) (1167–1192)
- Arditio (Ardizzone) (1192–1199)
- Grumerio (1199–1210)
- Folco di Pavia (1210–1216)
- Vicedominus (1217–1235)
- Aegidius, O.Cist. (1236–1242)

Sede vacante (1242–1244)

- Alberto Pandoni O.S.A. (1244–1247)
- Filippo Fulgoso (1257–1294)
- Albericus (1295–1301)

=== from 1300 to 1600 ===
Rainerius, O.Cist. (1301)

- Ubertus (1301–1302)
- Ugo (de Pilosi) (1302–1317)
- Fredericus Maggi (1317–1323)
- Bernardo Carrario (1323–1338)
- Rogerio Caccia (1338–1354)
- Pietro de Coconato (1355–1372)
- Francesco Castiglioni (1372–1373)
- Oberto Zagno (1373–1376)
- Conradus Giorgi (1376–1381)
- Andrea Serazoni, O.E.S.A. (1381–1383)
- Guilelmus Centuaria, O.Min. (1383–1386)
- Pietro Filargo, O.F.M. (1386–1388)
- Pietro Maineri (1388–1404)
- Branda da Castiglione (1404–1411)
- Alessio di Siregno, O.F.M. (27 Aug 1411 – 01 Jan 1447)
- Nicolò Amidano (1448–1453)
- Giovanni Campesi (23 Mar 1453 – 12 Apr 1474 Died)
- Michele Marliani (24 Sep 1475 – 12 Oct 1475 Died)
- Sagramoro Sagramori (1475–1476)
- Fabrizio Marliani (15 Jan 1476 – 1508 Died)
- Antonio Trivulzio (1508–1509)
- Vasino Malabayla (19 Jan 1509 –1519)
- Cardinal Scaramuccia Trivulzio (1519–1525) Administrator
- Catalano Trivulzio (1525–1559)
- Cardinal Gianbernardino Scotti, C.R. (1559–1568)
- Paolo Burali d'Arezzo, C.R. (23 Jul 1568 –1576)
- Tommaso Gigli (1576–1578)
- Filippo Sega (3 Oct 1578 – 29 May 1596 Died)

=== 1600 to 1800 ===
- Claudio Rangoni (1596–1619)
- Giovanni Linati (1619–1627)
- Alessandro Scappi (1627–1653?)
- Giuseppe Zandemaria (1654–1681)

Sede vacante (1681–1688)

- Giorgio Barni (1688–1731)
- Gherardo Zandemaria (1731–1746)
- Pietro Cristiani (1747–1765)
- Alessandro Pisani (2 Jun 1766 – 14 Mar 1783 Died)
- Gregorio (Gaetano Gerardo) Cerati, O.S.B. (1783 –1807)

=== from 1800 ===
- Etienne-André-François de Paule de Fallot de Béaupré de Beaumont (1807–1817)
- Carlo Scribani Rossi (28 Jul 1817 – 21 Oct 1823 Died)
- Lodovico Loschi (3 May 1824 – 14 Jun 1836 Died)
- Aloisio San Vitale (21 Nov 1836 – 25 Oct 1848 Died)
- Antonio Ranza (2 Apr 1849 – 20 Nov 1875 Died)
- Giovanni Battista Scalabrini (28 Jan 1876 – 1 Jun 1905 Died)
- Giovanni Maria Pellizzari (15 Sep 1905 – 18 Sep 1920 Died)
- Ersilio Menzani (16 Dec 1920 – 30 Jun 1961 Died)
- Umberto Malchiodi (30 Jun 1961 Succeeded – 3 Oct 1969 Retired)
- Enrico Manfredini (4 Oct 1969 – 18 Mar 1983)
- Antonio Mazza (20 Aug 1983 – 1 Dec 1994 Retired)

=== Diocese of Piacenza-Bobbio ===
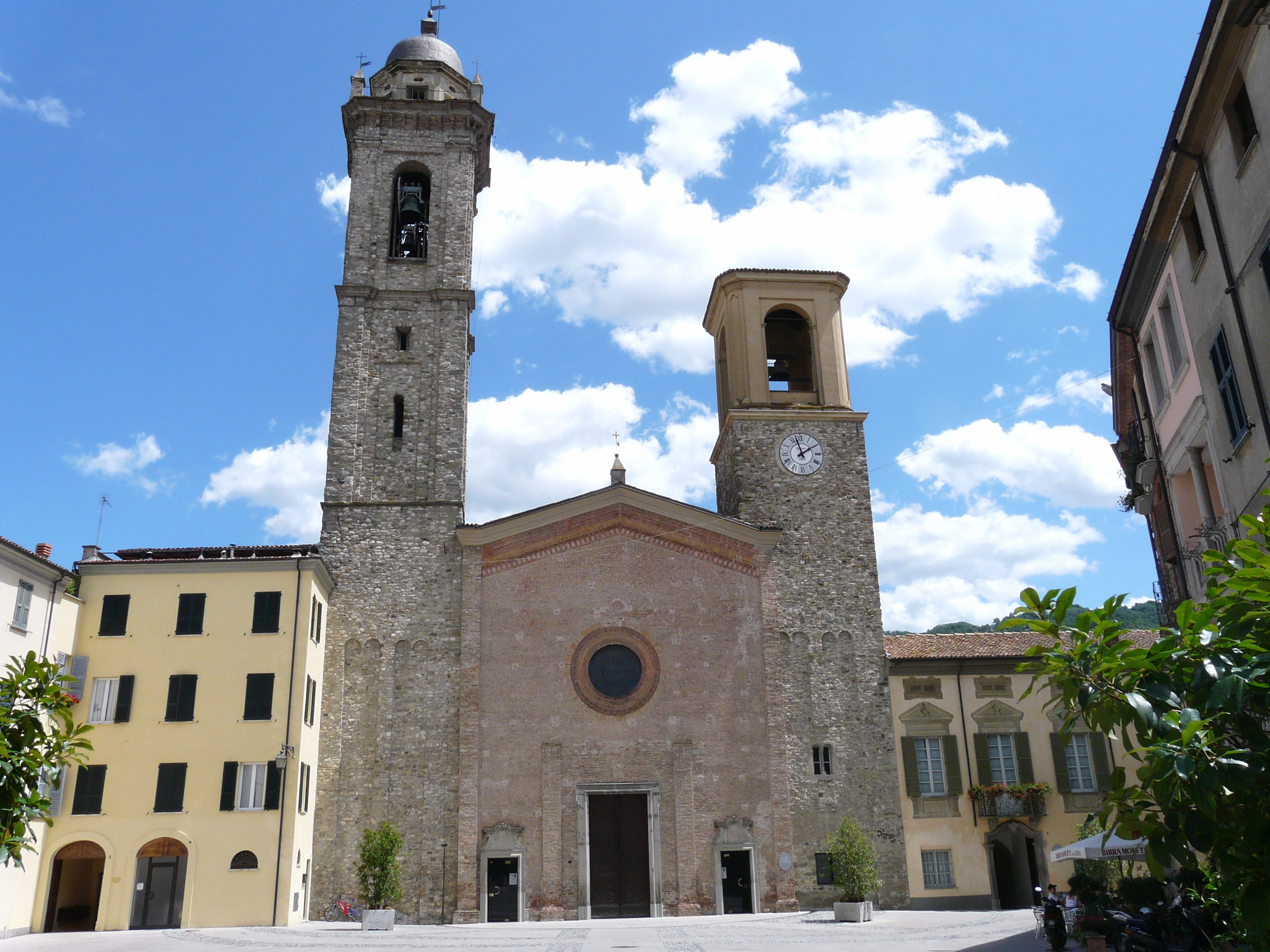
Co-cathedral in Bobbio

16 September 1989: United with part of the Archdiocese of Genova-Bobbio to form the Diocese of Piacenza-Bobbio

- Luciano Monari (23 Jun 1995 – 19 Jul 2007 Appointed, Bishop of Brescia)
- Gianni Ambrosio (22 Dec 2007 – 16 Jul 2020 Retired)
- Adriano Cevolotto (16 Jul 2020 – )

== Territorial extent and parishes ==
The diocese has 422 parishes which extend over an area of 3,715 square kilometres (1,434 sq mi). Most, like the city of Piacenza, are located within the (civil) region of Emilia-Romagna (Provinces of Parma and Piacenza). A further 24 parishes fall within five communes of the Ligurian Metropolitan City of Genoa, while 10 parishes are in the Lombard Province of Pavia.

== See also ==
- Timeline of Piacenza
- Roman Catholic Diocese of Bobbio

== Books ==
=== Reference works for bishops ===
- Gams, Pius Bonifatius (1873). Series episcoporum Ecclesiae catholicae: quotquot innotuerunt a beato Petro apostolo (in Latin). Ratisbon: Typis et Sumptibus Georgii Josephi Manz. pp. 745–747.
- Eubel, Conradus, ed. (1913). Hierarchia catholica (in Latin). Vol. Tomus 1 (second ed.). Münster: Libreria Regensbergiana. (in Latin)
- Eubel, Conradus, ed. (1914). Hierarchia catholica (in Latin). Vol. Tomus 2 (second ed.). Münster: Libreria Regensbergiana.
- Gulik, Guilelmus (1923). Eubel, Conradus (ed.). Hierarchia catholica (in Latin). Vol. Tomus 3 (second ed.). Münster: Libreria Regensbergiana.
- Gauchat, Patritius (Patrice) (1935). Hierarchia catholica. Vol. Tomus IV (1592-1667). Münster: Libraria Regensbergiana.
- Ritzler, Remigius; Sefrin, Pirminus (1952). Hierarchia catholica medii et recentis aevi. Vol. Tomus V (1667-1730). Patavii: Messagero di S. Antonio.
- Ritzler, Remigius; Sefrin, Pirminus (1958). Hierarchia catholica medii et recentis aevi. Vol. Tomus VI (1730-1799). Patavii: Messagero di S. Antonio.
- Ritzler, Remigius; Sefrin, Pirminus (1968). Hierarchia Catholica medii et recentioris aevi (in Latin). Vol. VII (1800–1846). Monasterii: Libreria Regensburgiana.
- Remigius Ritzler; Pirminus Sefrin (1978). Hierarchia catholica Medii et recentioris aevi (in Latin). Vol. VIII (1846–1903). Il Messaggero di S. Antonio.
- Pięta, Zenon (2002). Hierarchia catholica medii et recentioris aevi (in Latin). Vol. IX (1903–1922). Padua: Messagero di San Antonio. ISBN 978-88-250-1000-8.

=== Studies ===
- [Anonymus AC10270291] (1790). Saggio delle costituzioni sinodali della Chiesa Piacentina, ossia memoria per servire alla prossima celebrazione del sinodo diocesano di Piacenza (in Italian). Cremona: Ferrari.
- Cappelletti, Giuseppe (1859). Le chiese d'Italia: dalla loro origine sino ai nostri giorni (in Italian). Vol. Tomo decimoquinto (15). Venezia: G. Antonelli. pp. 9–70.
- Buttafuoco, Gaetano (1854). Dizionario corografico dei ducati di Parma, Piacenza e Guastalla (in Italian). Vol. 2. Miland: Giuseppe Civelli.
- Campi, Pietro Maria (1651). Dell'Historia Ecclesiastica Di Piacenza (in Italian). Vol. Parte prima. Piacenza: Bazachi.
- Campi, Pietro Maria (1651). Dell' historia ecclesiastica di Piacenza (in Italian). Vol. Parte seconda. Piacenza: per Giouanni Bazachi.
- Campi, Pietro Maria (1662). Dell' historia ecclesiastica di Piacenza (in Italian). Vol. III. Piacenza: Per Giouanni Bazachi.
- Piacenza, Pietro (1900). Cronotassi dei Vescovi di Piacenza (in Italian). Piacenza: V. G. Tedeschi.
- Il Duomo di Piacenza (1122–1972): Atti del Convegno di studi storici in occasione dell'850o anniversario della fondazione della Cattedrale di Piacenza (Piacenza, 1975). (in Italian)
- Glass, Dorothy F. "The Bishops of Piacenza, their Cathedral, and the Reform of the Church," in: John S. Ott and Anna Trumbore Jones, ed. (2017). "Chapter 13". The Bishop Reformed: Studies of Episcopal Power and Culture in the Central Middle Ages. New York: Routledge-Taylor & Francis. ISBN 978-1-351-89392-3.
- Kehr, Paul Fridolin (1906). Italia Pontificia Vol. V: Aemilia, sive Provincia Ravennas. Berlin: Weidmann, pp. 441–514. (in Latin).
- Lanzoni, Francesco (1927). Le diocesi d'Italia dalle origini al principio del secolo VII (an. 604). Faenza: F. Lega, pp. 813–819. (in Italian)
- Molinari, Franco (1957). Il cardinale teatino beato Paolo Burali e la riforma tridentina a Piacenza (1568-1576). Analecta Gregoriana (in Italian). Rome: Gregorian University. ISBN 978-88-7652-065-5.
- Molinari, Franco (1969). Il Seminario di Piacenza e il suo fondatore: (4^{o} centenario) (in Italian). Piacenza.
- Racine, Pierre (2008). Storia della Diocesi di Piacenza: dalle origini all'anno mille (in Italian). Vol. II, parte 1: Il Medioevo. Brescia: Morcelliana. ISBN 978-88-372-2287-1.
- Schwartz, Gerhard (1907). Die Besetzung der Bistümer Reichsitaliens unter den sächsischen und salischen Kaisern: mit den Listen der Bischöfe, 951-1122. Leipzig: B.G. Teubner. (in German) pp. 188–195.
- Ughelli, Ferdinando; Coleti, Niccolo (1717). Italia sacra sive de Episcopis Italiae (in Latin). Vol. Tomus secundus (II) (secunda ed.). Venice: Apud Sebastianum Coleti. pp. 194–238.
