= Diocese of Fidenza =

Roman Catholic diocese in Italy

Coordinates: 44.8667°N 10.0667°E

Diocese of Fidenza Dioecesis Fidentina

Catholic
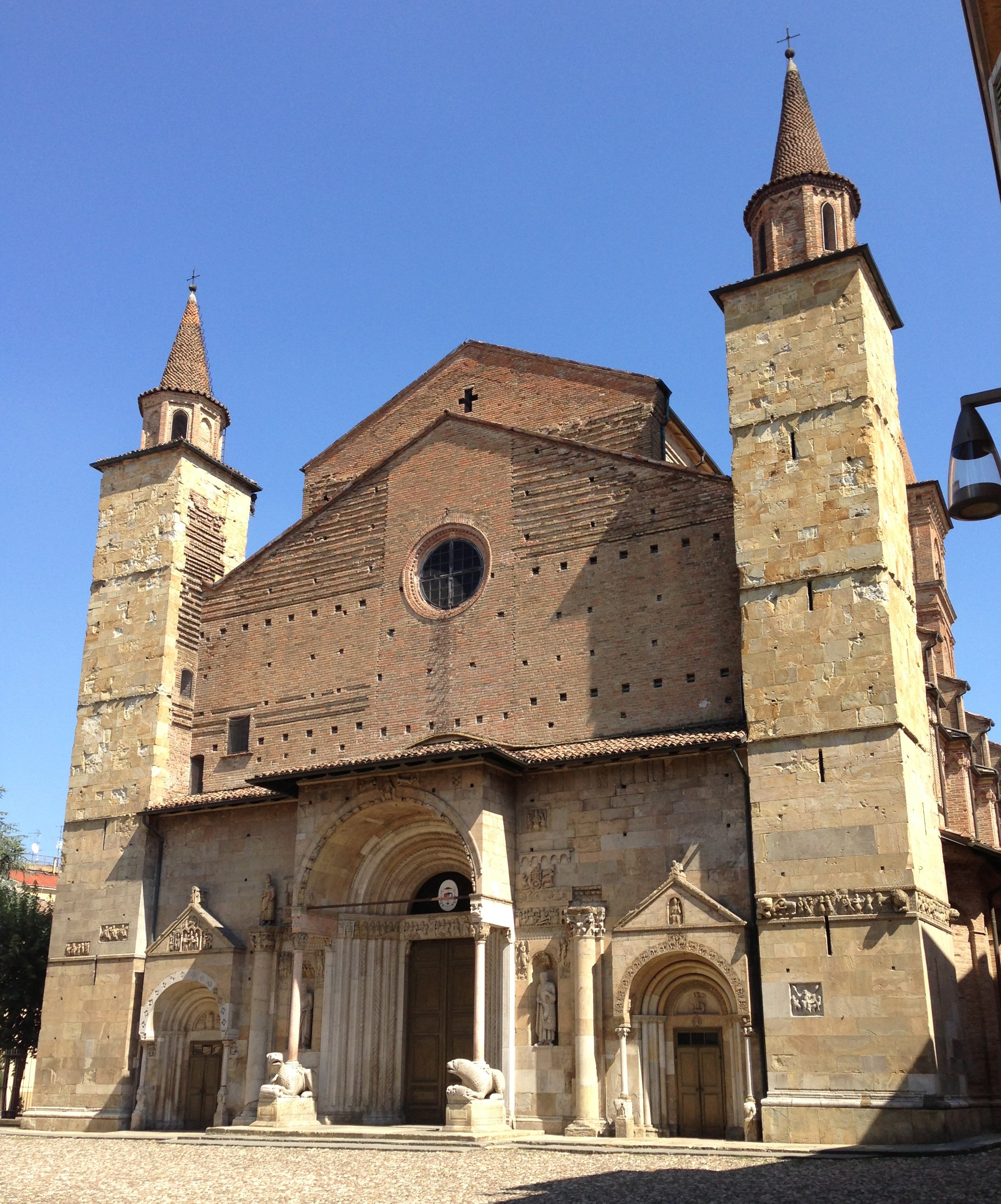
- Fidenza Cathedral

Location
- Country: Italy
- Ecclesiastical province: Modena-Nonantola

Statistics
- Area: 451 km^{2} (174 sq mi)
- Population: Total; Catholics: (as of 2026); 69,660 ▼; 67,198 ▲ (96.5%)
- Parishes: 70

Information
- Denomination: Catholic Church
- Rite: Roman Rite
- Established: 12 February 1601
- Cathedral: Cattedrale di S. Donnino Mattire
- Secular priests: 34 ▼ (diocesan); 8 (Religious Orders) ▲16 Permanent Deacons

Current leadership
- Pope: Leo XIV
- Bishop: Ovidio Vezzoli
- Bishops emeritus: Carlo Mazza

Website
- www.diocesifidenza.it

The Diocese of Fidenza (Latin: Dioecesis Fidentina) is a Latin diocese of the Catholic Church in the Province of Parma, Italy. It was until 1927 named the Diocese of Borgo San Donnino. It is now a suffragan of the Metropolitan Archdiocese of Modena-Nonantola, though historically it was long subject to the Archdiocese of Bologna.

The bishop's episcopal seat is the Cathedral of San Donnino Martire, in Fidenza.

The diocese has a Minor Basilica, the Basilica di San Lorenzo, in Monticelli d'Ongina; it was assigned that honor on 9 January 1942.

== History ==
In 1199 a long and bloody war was in progress between Parma and Piacenza over Borgo San Donnino. Pope Innocent III rallied the bishops of Lombardy and wrote threateningly to both combatants, attempting to force them to make peace. However, the Pope also asserted Church ownership of the Borgo, and claimed the right to assign its civil jurisdiction.

=== Creation of the diocese ===
In 1600, the town (oppidum) of Borgo San Donnino, including a territory with seventeen villages, was under the civil government of Ranuccio I Farnese, Duke of Parma and Piacenza. In the town was one collegiate church, the Church of S. Donnino, which belonged to no diocese (nullius dioecesis), and which had three parish churches, three monasteries of men and two of women, and five hospices attached to it. The collegiate church and its dependencies were administered by a chapter, composed of eight canons with eight prebends. They were presided over by a provost (una praepositura), who had to be in Holy Orders, since he held the "cure of souls"; he had an annual income of about 1,300 papal ducats. The Provost had the ordinary jurisdiction (iurisdictionem ordinariam) in the town and its territory, and had the right to use a mitre and pastoral staff.

On 12 February 1601, by the bull Super universas, Pope Clement VIII suppressed and extinguished the office of Provost of the Collegiate Chapter of S. Donnino, and erected the collegiate church into a cathedral, to be the seat of a bishop directly dependent upon the Holy See. A new cathedral chapter was created, headed by an Archdeacon and an Archpriest, with the eight canons of the former collegiate church and an additional four canons, with four additional prebends. The additional prebends were endowed by the Duke. Two of the original eight canons of the collegiate chapter were to serve as Theologus and Penitentiary. The Dukes of Parma were granted the right of patronage and presentation of future Archdeacons, Archpriests, and the four new canonries.

To provide income to support the administration of the new diocese, the Pope transferred territory from the diocese of Cremona situated south of the Po and adjacent to the diocese of Piacenza, to the diocese of Borgo San Donnino. This included Busseto, Polesine Parmense, and Monticelli d'Ogina.

In the papal consistory of 8 January 1603 Pope Clement VIII appointed the last provost, Papiro Picedi da Castel Vezzano, to be the first Bishop of Borgo San Donnino. A brief (breve) addressed to him on the same day informed him of his appointment, recalling that Picedi had been a priest of the diocese of Luni-Sarzana; that he held the degree of Doctor in utroque iure; that he had been a Referendary of the Two Signatures (judge in the Roman Curia); and that he was a familiaris of the Pope.

=== Development of the diocese ===
The diocese also had three collegiate churches: Insigne de Busseto (5 Canons), Monticelli d'Ongina (4 Canons), and Pieve Ottoville (4 canons).

In 1828, Bishop Aloisio San Vitale was assigned the task and the honor of creating the new diocese of Guastalla by Pope Leo XII. The Pope also consecrated the first bishop of Bishop of Guastalla, Giovanni Tommaso Neuschel, who later became Bishop of Borgo San Donnino on Bishop San Vitale's death.

In 1885, the Cathedral Chapter consisted of four dignities (Archdeacon, Archpriest, Primicerius, and Penitentiarius) and eight Canons. The diocesan seminary was headed by a priest who was also the Vicar General of the diocese, and it had five professors and two masters; there were thirty-eight students.

During World War I, the diocesan seminary was requisitioned as a hospital for wounded soldiers.

On 22 September 1927 the diocese of Borgo San Donnino was renamed the Diocese of Fidenza.

During World War II, in May 1944, Fidenza was bombed, and on 2 May the Episcopal Palace was hit. There was heavy damage to the diocesan archives. On 13 May another attack destroyed the Episcopal Palace and the Seminary. On 29 January 1948, Bishop Francesco Giberti opened the drive to rebuild the Seminary.

The diocese enjoyed a Papal visit from Pope John Paul II in June 1988.

On 14 January 2003, the Bishops of Fidenza, Parma, and Piacenza entered into a friendly agreement for the adjustment of their diocesan borders. The diocese of Parma received the parishes of Cella, Noceto and Varano Marchesi, from Fidenza. The diocese of Piacenza received the parishes of Mercore and Bersano from Fidenza. The diocese of Fidenza received the parish of San Vitale in Salsomaggiore from Parma; and the parishes of Aione, Besozzola, Cangelasio, Careno, Grotta, Iggio, Mariano, Rigollo, San Nazaro d’Ongina, Scipione, and Varone, from Piacenza.

The most famous native son of Borgo San Donnino was Cardinal Innocenzo Ciocchi del Monte, the adopted nephew of Pope Julius III.

=== Synods ===
A diocesan synod was an irregular but important meeting of the bishop of a diocese and his clergy. Its purpose was (1) to proclaim generally the various decrees already issued by the bishop; (2) to discuss and ratify measures on which the bishop chose to consult with his clergy; (3) to publish statutes and decrees of the diocesan synod, of the provincial synod, and of the Holy See.

The first diocesan synod was held by Bishop Giovanni Linati (1606–1620) on 14 October 1608. He held the second diocesan synod on 15 October 1615. The third diocesan synod was held by Bishop Alfonso Pozzi (Puteo) on 20 May 1624. Bishop Antonio Pallavicini presided over the diocesan synod of 4–6 June 1663. Bishop Gaetano Garimberti (1675–1684) presided over the diocesan synod of 5 December 1678. Bishop Nicolò Caranza (1686–1697) held a diocesan synod on 20–22 May 1697. He ordered the minutes of the meetings published, to which he had appended thirteen enactments of popes or Roman curial offices. His own decrees included regulations for the Cathedral Chapter (Caput XXIII–XXVI).

Bishop Adriano Sermattei (1713–1719) held a diocesan synod in 1713. On 27–29 April 1728, Bishop Gherardo Zandemaria (1719–1731) held a diocesan synod.

Bishop Vincenzo Manicardi (1879–1886) presided over a diocesan synod on 5–7 June 1883; it was particularly concerned with issues raised by the First Vatican Council.

In 1956 Bishop Paolo Rota (1953–1960) presided over a diocesan synod. Bishop Mario Zanchin (1962–1988) conducted a diocesan synod in 1987.

== Bishops of Borgo San Donnino ==
- Papirio Picedi (1603–1606)
- Giovanni Linati (1606–1620)
- Alfonso Pozzi (1620–1626)
- Ranuccio Scotti Douglas (1627–1650)
- Filippo Casoni (1650–1659)
- Alessandro Pallavicini, O.S.B. (1660–1675)
- Gaetano Garimberti C.R. (1675–1684)

Sede vacante (March 1684–August 1686)

- Nicolò Caranza (1686–1697)
- Giulio Della Rosa (1698–1699)
- Alessandro Roncoveri (1700–1711)
- Adriano Sermattei (1713–1719)
- Gherardo Zandemaria (1719–1731)
- Severino Antonio Missini (1732–1753)
- Girolamo Bajardi (1753–1775)
- Alessandro Garimberti (1776–1813)

Sede vacante (1813–1817)

- Aloisio San Vitale (1817–1836)
- Giovanni Tommaso Neuschel (1836–1843)
- Pier Grisologo Basetti (1843–1857)

Sede vacante (16 June 1857 – 20 June 1859)

- Francesco Benassi (1859–1871)
- Giuseppe Buscarini (1871–1872)
- Gaetano Guindani (1872– 1879)
- Vincenzo Manicardi (1879–1886)
- Giovanni Battista Tescari (1886.06.07 – death 1902.07.08)
- Pietro Terroni (1903.06.22 – death 1907.08.28)
- Leonida Mapelli (1907.10.14 – death 1915.02.24)
- Giuseppe Fabbrucci (1915.08.06 – 1927.09.22 see below)

=== Bishops of Fidenza ===
- Giuseppe Fabbrucci (continuing, with changed title 1927–1930)
- Mario Vianello (1931–1943)
- Francesco Giberti (1943–1952)
- Paolo Rota (1952–1960)
- Guglielmo Bosetti (1961–1962)
- Mario Zanchin (1962–1988)
- Carlo Poggi (1988–1997)
- Maurizio Galli (1998–2007)
- Carlo Mazza (2007–2017)
- Ovidio Vezzoli (2017 – ... )

== See also ==
- List of Catholic dioceses in Italy

== Bibliography ==
- Gams, Pius Bonifatius (1873). Series episcoporum Ecclesiae catholicae: quotquot innotuerunt a beato Petro apostolo. Ratisbon: Typis et Sumptibus Georgii Josephi Manz. (in Latin)
- Gauchat, Patritius (Patrice) (1935). Hierarchia catholica. Vol. Tomus IV (1592-1667). Münster: Libraria Regensbergiana. (in Latin)
- Ritzler, Remigius; Sefrin, Pirminus (1952). Hierarchia catholica medii et recentis aevi. Vol. V (1667-1730). Patavii: Messagero di S. Antonio.
- Ritzler, Remigius; Sefrin, Pirminus (1958). Hierarchia catholica medii et recentis aevi. Vol. VI (1730-1799). Patavii: Messagero di S. Antonio. pp. 175–176.
- Ritzler, Remigius; Sefrin, Pirminus (1968). Hierarchia Catholica medii et recentioris aevi (in Latin). Vol. VII (1800–1846). Monasterii: Libr. Regensburgiana.
- Remigius Ritzler; Pirminus Sefrin (1978). Hierarchia catholica Medii et recentioris aevi (in Latin). Vol. VIII (1846–1903). Il Messaggero di S. Antonio.
- Pięta, Zenon (2002). Hierarchia catholica medii et recentioris aevi (in Latin). Vol. IX. Padua: Messagero di San Antonio. ISBN 978-88-250-1000-8.

=== Studies ===
- Cappelletti, Giuseppe (1859). Le chiese d'Italia: dalla loro origine sino ai nostri giorni (in Italian). Vol. Tomo decimoquinto (15). Venezia: G. Antonelli. pp. 71–89.
- Kojima, Yoshie (2006). Storia di una cattedrale: il Duomo di San Donnino a Fidenza : il cantiere medievale, le trasformazioni, i restauri (in Italian). Pisa: Edizioni della Normale. ISBN 978-88-7642-184-6.
- Soresina, Dario (1961–1979). Enciclopedia diocesana fidentina (in Italian). Vol. I.: Personaggi, II.: Citta e paesi, III.: Le parrocchie. Fidenza: Ed. Enciclopedia diocesana fidentina (Tip. La commerciale).
- Ughelli, Ferdinando (1717). Coleti, Niccolò (ed.). Italia sacra sive De Episcopis Italiae, et insularum adjacentium (in Latin). Vol. Tomus secundus (2) (secunda ed.). Venice: apud Sebastianum Coleti. pp. 62–73.

==== External links ====
- The Annuario diocesano 2018 is available for download from the diocesan web site.
- GCatholic, with map & satellite photo - data for all sections
- Benigni, Umberto. "Borgo San-Donnino." The Catholic Encyclopedia. Vol. 2. New York: Robert Appleton Company, 1907. Retrieved: 19 September 2018.
- Albert Battandier, Annuaire pontifical catholique. (Paris, 1907)
