= San Donnino, Piacenza =

Church in Piacenza, Italy

Coordinates: 45°03′06″N 9°41′34″E

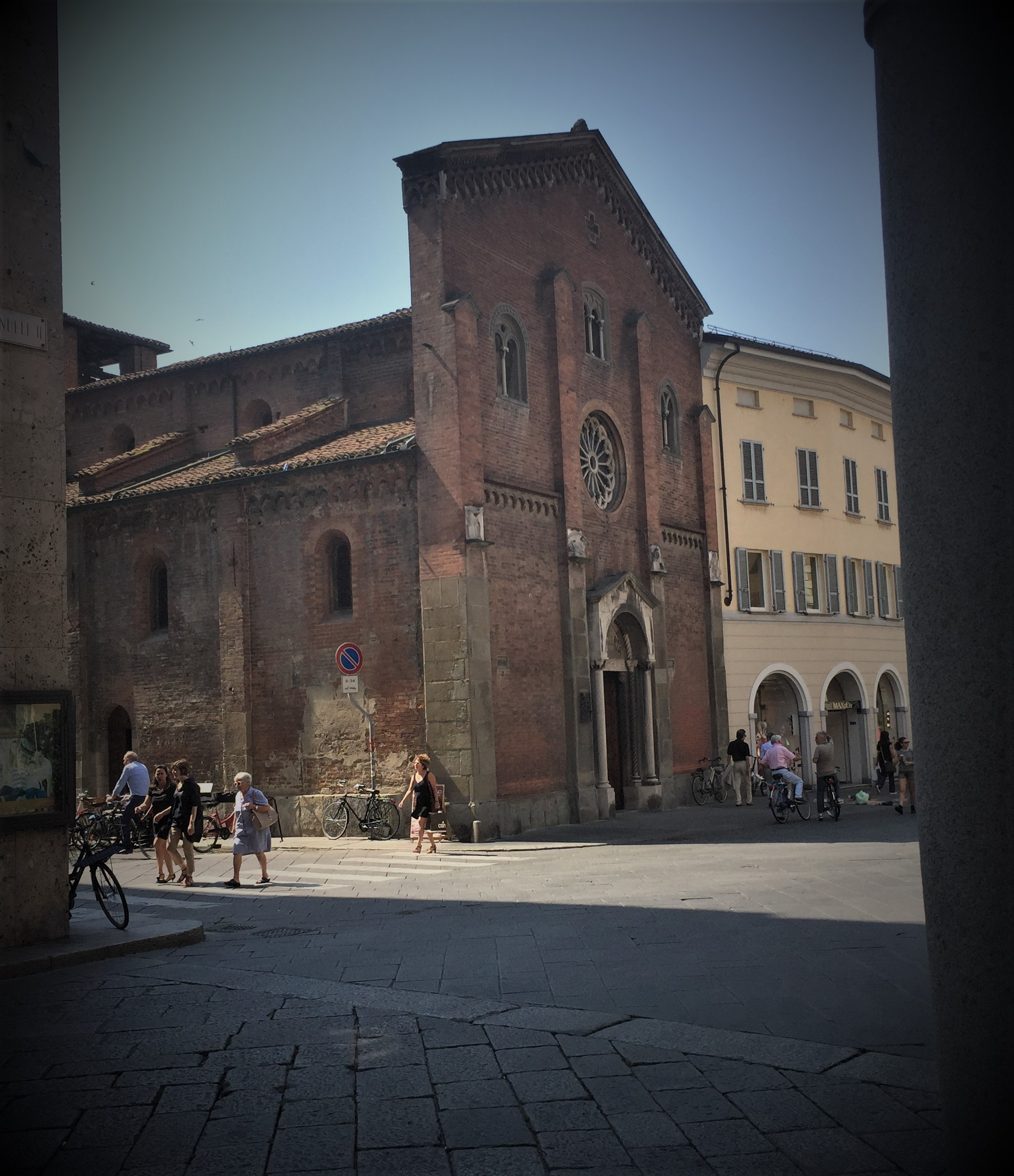
Church of San Donnino - Piacenza - Emilia Romagna - Italy

San Donnino or San Donnino Martire is a Romanesque style Catholic church located at the intersection of Largo Cesare Battisti and Vicolo San Donnino in the historic center of Piacenza, Region of Emilia Romagna, Italy. Little is known of San Donnino (St Domninus), to whom the church is dedicated, as are other churches elsewhere, including Pisa. A St Domninus appears in early Church sources and some identify him with St Domninus of Fidenza, to whom Fidenza Cathedral is also dedicated. For some the Piacenza Domninus was a deacon of Piacenza in the early Christian period.

== History ==
A church was built on the site by the 12th century, but rebuilt in 1236 by Cardinal Jacopo da Pecoraria, Bishop of Palestrina (1231–1244), who in his youth had been a cleric attached to the church. The original structure dating from this time follows a decidedly Romanesque basilica plan with three naves closed by semi-circular apses. The interior and the façade were remodeled throughout the centuries. After an unexpected collapse of the nave in 1951, the latest restoration removed many of the additions accumulated over the centuries. The choir and the sanctuary had been frescoed with quadratura by Francesco and Giovanni Battista Natali, with figures by Bartolomeo Rusca. The church houses the adoration of the Blessed Sacrament and holds a bronze crucifix by Giorgio Groppi donated by the baker's guild in town. It also held near the sacristy a canvas of St Anne, St Joseph, and other Saints by Bartolomeo Baderna. The facade had been originally been frescoed in the renaissance period.

A congregation of religious women is affiliated with the parish church.
