= Domninus of Fidenza =

Italian Catholic saint

Saint Domninus of Fidenza
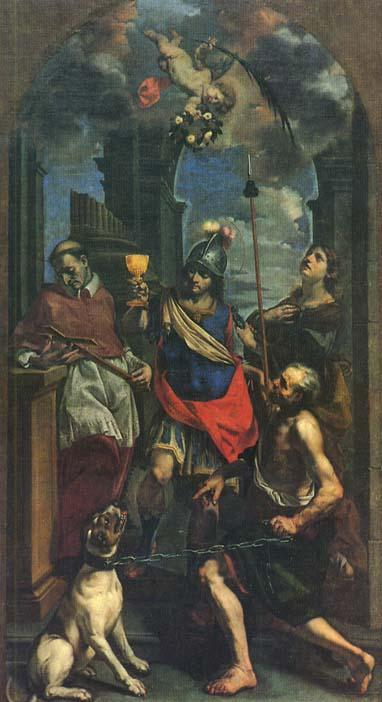
- Saint Charles Borromeo, Saint Domninus, and Saint Apollonia. Cristoforo Savolini.
- Died: c. 304 AD
- Venerated in: Roman Catholic Church
- Major shrine: Fidenza
- Feast: 9 October
- Attributes: dog; cup; palm of martyrdom; depicted as a soldier
- Patronage: Fidenza; invoked against rabies

Saint Domninus of Fidenza (Italian: San Donnino di Fidenza) is an Italian Catholic saint. According to tradition, he died in 304 AD and was a native of Parma. The cathedral in Fidenza (a town once called Borgo San Donnino) is dedicated to him. The Hieronymian Martyrology commemorates Domninus, but does not include any further information about him, and his feast day is cited as occurring on 9 October. He is not commemorated in the martyrologies of Bede, Ado, Notker, or the Parvum Romanum.

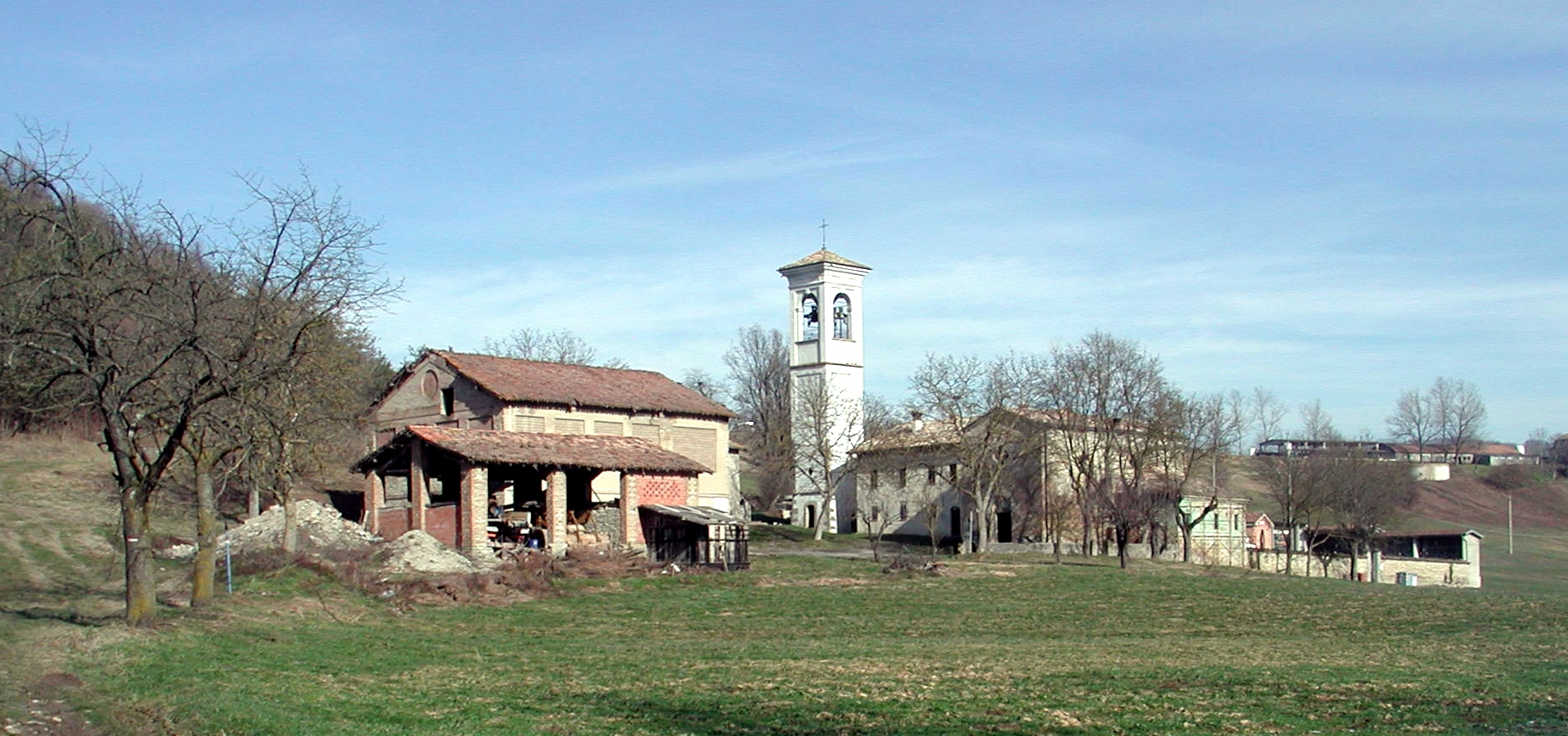
Church of San Donnino in Carpineti

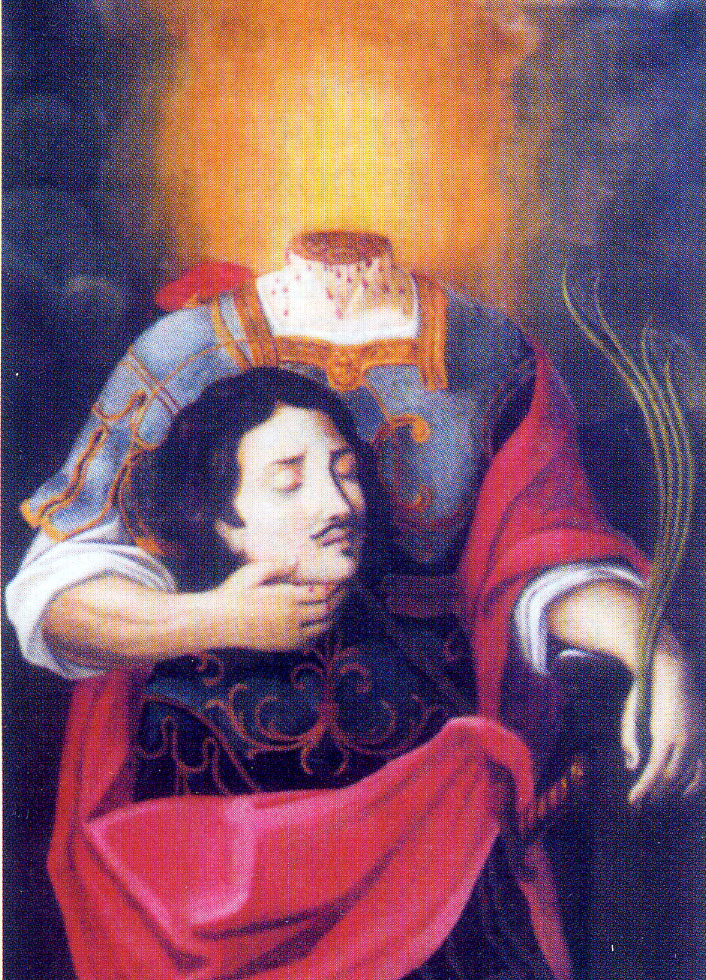
Domninus of Fidenza

His legend states that Domninus was Chamberlain to Emperor Maximian and keeper of the royal crown, and converted to Christianity, thereby incurring the emperor's wrath. Pursued by imperial forces, he rode through Piacenza holding a cross. He was caught and beheaded on the banks of the Stirone, outside of Fidenza, or the Via Aemilia. It is recounted that Domninus picked up his severed head and placed it on the future site of the cathedral of San Donnino.

== Veneration ==
His relics are enshrined in Fidenza Cathedral, adding some plausibility to the tradition that he suffered martyrdom in this region. The ancient basilica at Fidenza, rebuilt in the 12th century, includes a sculpted frieze sub-divided into five scenes representing the life of the saint. The sculptures are attributed to the school of Benedetto Antelami.

In art, Domninus is depicted in military attire and holds the palm of martyrdom. Domninus' cult was popular in Northern Italy. He has been from earliest times invoked against rabies; his Passio records that after water and wine were blessed and the saint invoked, anyone who drank this would be cured of rabies.

Other churches dedicated to San Donnino include:

- San Donnino, Modena
- San Donnino, Bologna
- San Donnino Martire, Montecchio
- San Donnino, Piacenza
- San Donnino, Pisa
