= San Thomas Becket, Fidenza =

Church building in Fidenza, Italy

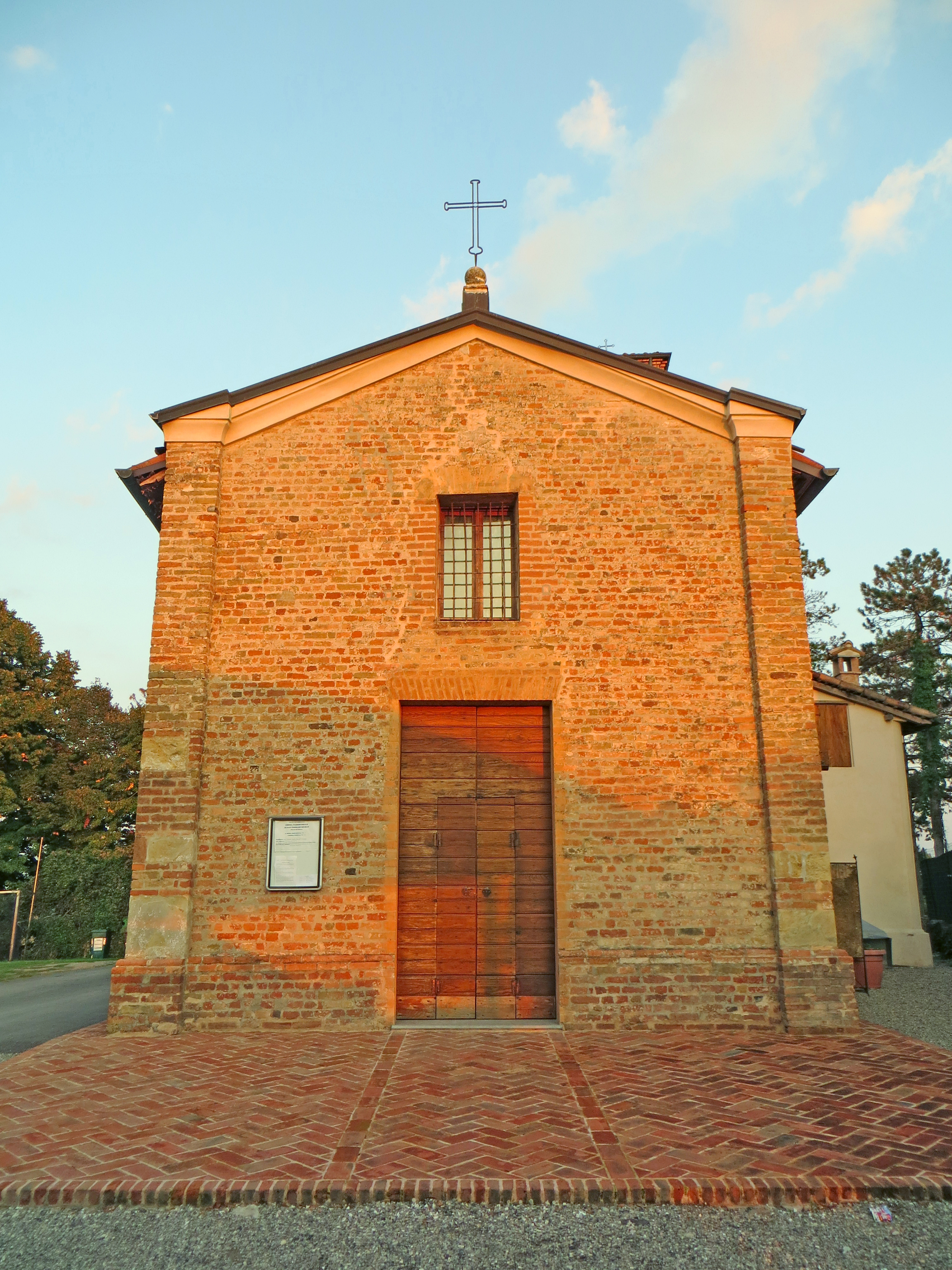
Chiesa di San Tommaso Becket (Cabriolo, Fidenza) - facciata 1 2019-10-02.jpg

San Thomas Becket is a small Roman Catholic church in the frazione of Capriolo of Fidenza, province of Parma, region of Emilia-Romagna, northern Italy.

The church is most notable for still preserving a Romanesque apse, although the simple brick church has undergone much restoration. Dedicatede to St Thomas Becket, who putatively traveled through here. The church was originally built by the Knights Templar in the 12th or 13th century. The nave and facade date to the 15th century. In the early 14th century the buildings at the site were nearly demolished with the suppression of the Templars. It was restored under the gerosolimitani. The bell tower base dates to the 15th century, but only raised by 1928.
