= Madonna del Popolo, Montecchio =

Church in Emilia Romagna, Italy

Coordinates: 44°41′58.7″N 10°26′46.0″E

Madonna del Popolo
- Chiesa della Madonna del Popolo
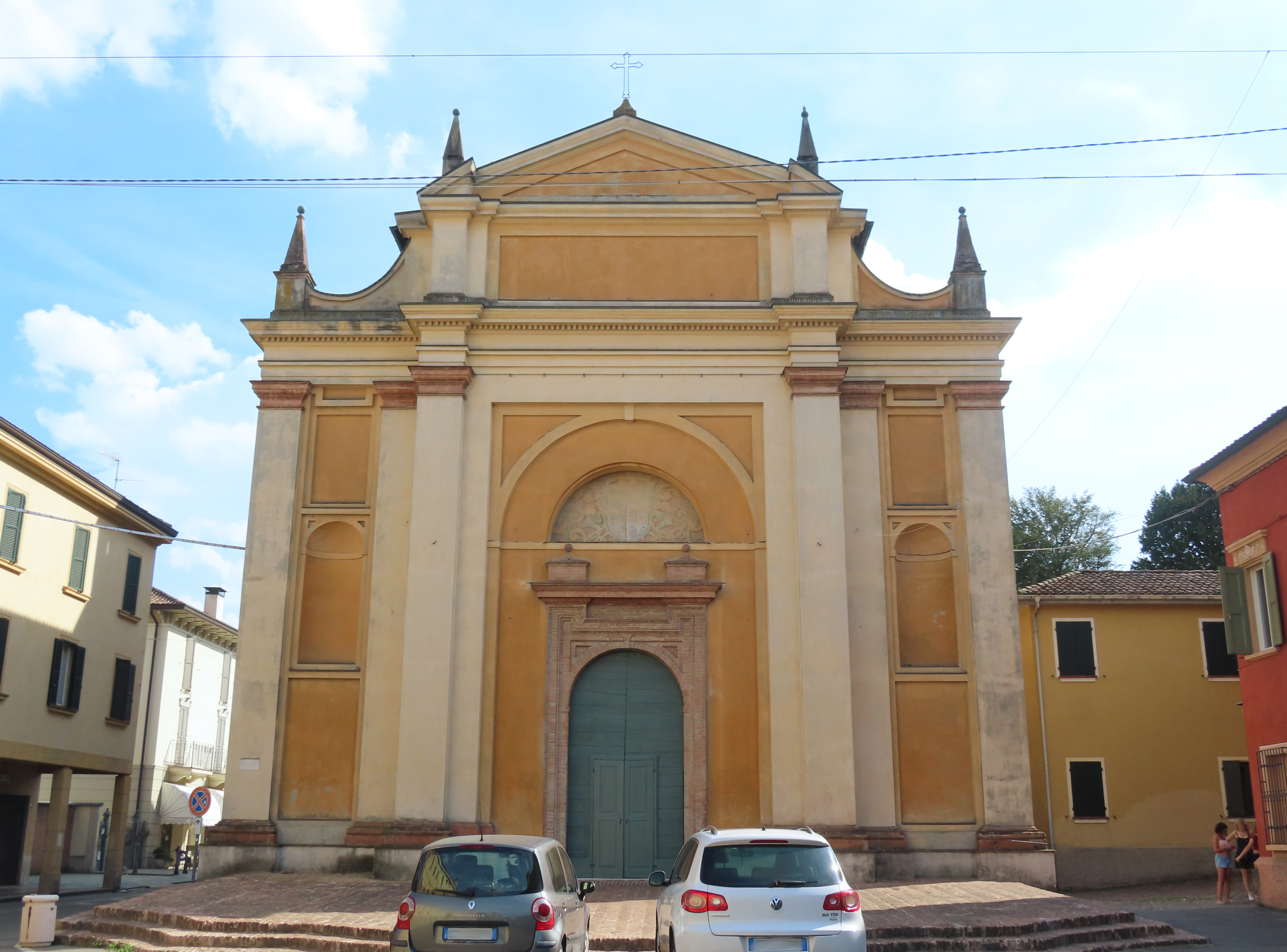
- Chiesa della Madonna del Popolo (2023)

- Denomination: Catholic

Madonna del Popolo is a Roman Catholic church located facing the town square of Montecchio Emilia, in the province of Reggio Emilia, region of Emilia-Romagna, Italy.

== History ==
The present church was erected by the Confraternity del Suffragio, and is documented since 1618, and notes indicated consecration by 1634. In the past, the façade was painted with the coat of arms of Alfonso I d'Este. The interior has a single nave with a pitched roof. The lateral chapels include works by Giuseppe Boni and a 17th-century canvas depicting the veneration of the Virgin and surrounding saints.

In the past, the confraternity held the titles of delle Anime Purganti (of the Souls of Purgatory); del Santissimo Sangue (of the Holiest Blood); and della Buona Morte (of the Good Death). At the start of the 1700s a relic, a piece of the veil of Mary, stained with the blood of Jesus, was donated to the church. In 1798 the confraternity was suppressed, and the property expropriated. The church passed on to other ecclesiastical groups.
