= San Donnino Martire, Montecchio =

Church building in Montecchio Emilia, Italy

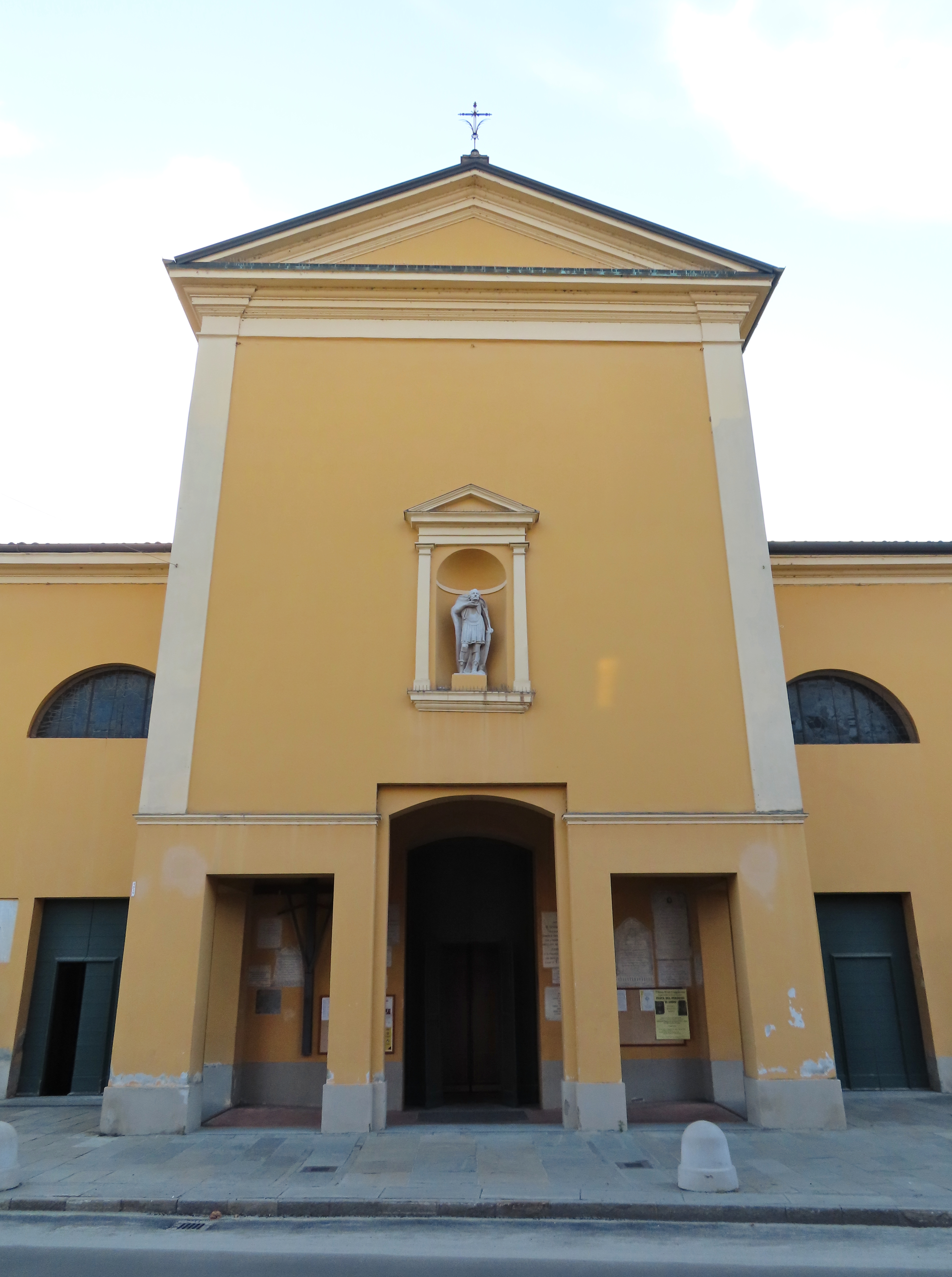
Facade of the parish of San Donnino in Montecchio Emilia, c. 2022

San Donnino Martire is a late-Renaissance style, Roman Catholic parish church located on Via Franchini in the town of Montecchio Emilia, in the Province of Reggio Emilia, region of Emilia-Romagna, Italy.

== History ==
The site had an oratory by the ninth century; at one time, the church was attached to an abbey. In 1233, the church and its diocese were linked to the rule of Parma. In 1596-1600, the church and bell-tower were reconstructed. the church has a nave and two aisles leading to a semicircular apse. The facade has three doorways, and above the central doorway, a niche houses the statue of St Domninus of Fidenza. The bell-tower was only completed in 1948.

The interior has a chapel of the Holy Sacrament painted in 1903 by Augusto Mussini (Fra' Paolo da Reggio). The main altarpiece is an 18th-century canvas depicting the namesake saint by Jean-Baptiste Le Bel. The wooden choir was carved in the 1800s by Brindani.
