= Parma Cathedral =

Roman Catholic cathedral in Italy

Coordinates: 44°48′12″N 10°19′52″E

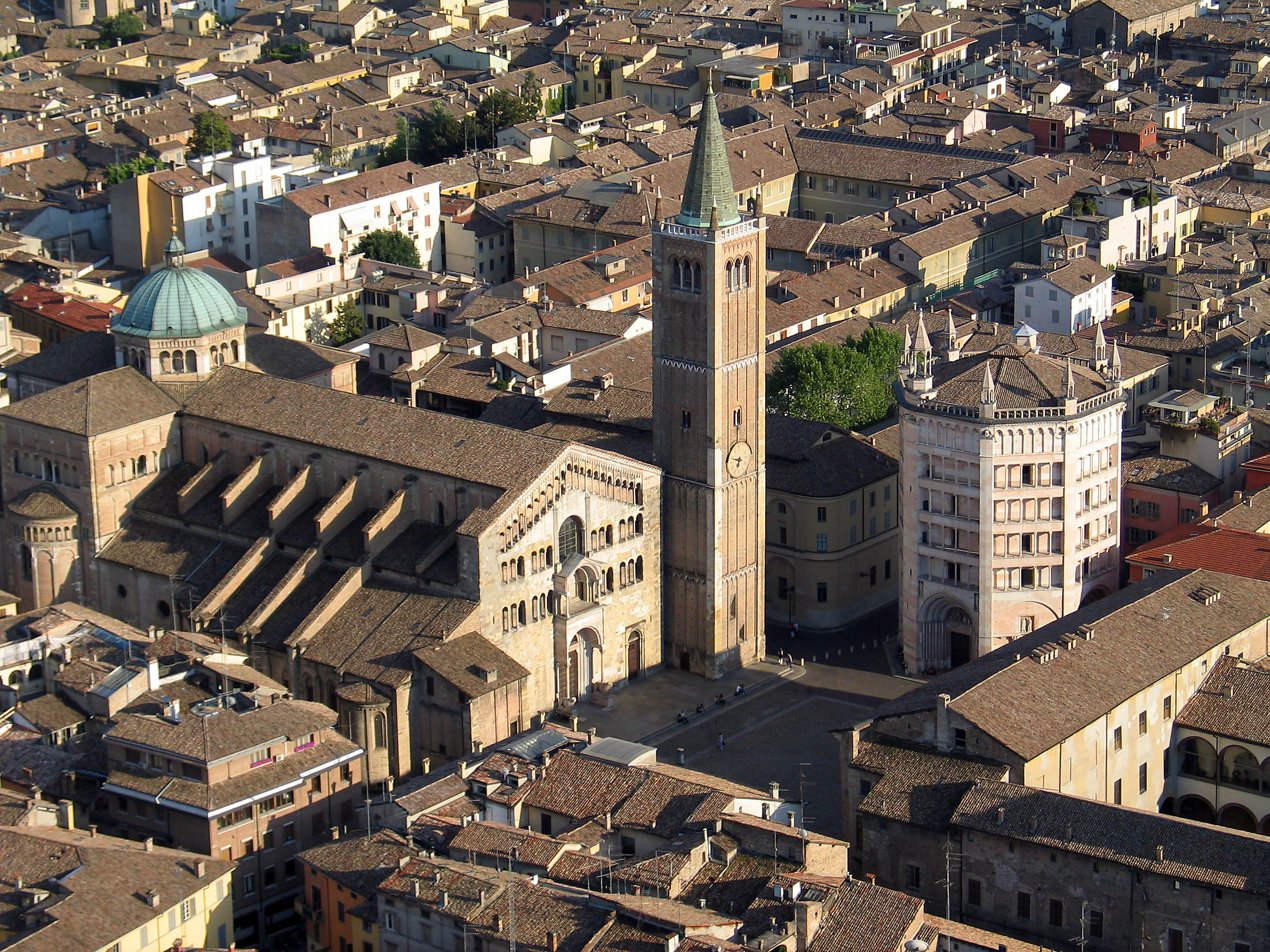
Aerial view of Parma Cathedral with its bell tower

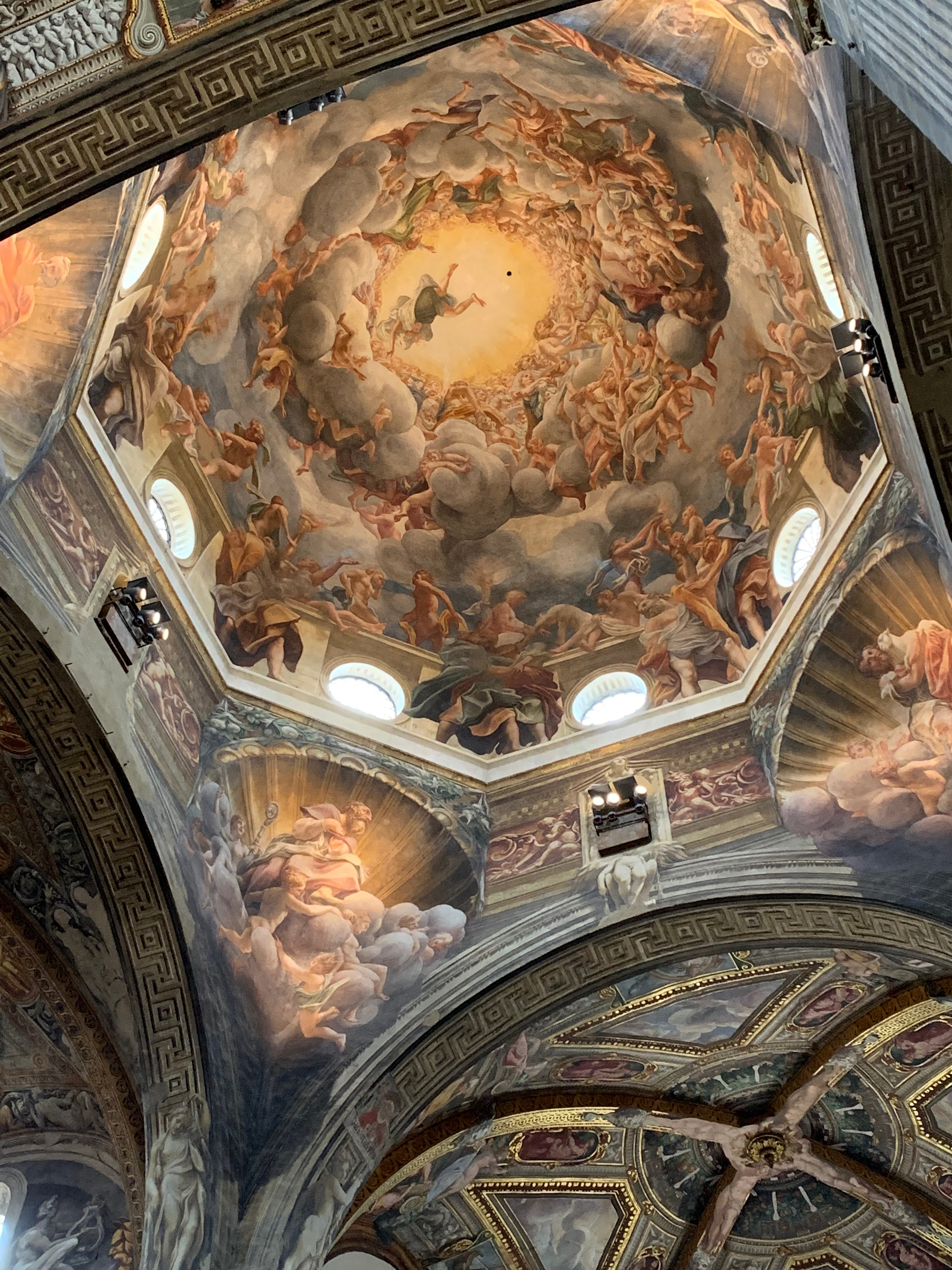
Illusionistic cupola fresco of the Assumption by Antonio da Correggio

Parma Cathedral (Italian: Duomo di Parma; Cattedrale di Santa Maria Assunta) is a Roman Catholic cathedral in Parma, Emilia-Romagna, dedicated to the Assumption of the Blessed Virgin Mary. It is the episcopal seat of the Diocese of Parma. It is an important Italian Romanesque cathedral: the dome, in particular, is decorated by a highly influential illusionistic fresco by Renaissance painter Antonio da Correggio.

== History ==
A basilica existed probably in the 6th century, but was later abandoned; another church had been consecrated in the rear part of the preceding one in the 9th century by count-bishop Guibodo.

After a fire destroyed the early Christian basilica in August 1058, Bishop Cadalo broke ground for a new cathedral in a different place; the building was consecrated by Paschal II in 1106. The new church was heavily damaged by an earthquake in 1117 and had to be restored. Of the original building, remains can be seen in the presbytery, the transept, the choir and the apses, and some sculpture fragments.

== Architecture ==
The wide façade, made from blocks of sandstone, was completed in 1178: it has three loggia floors and three portals, whose doors were sculpted by Luchino Bianchino in 1494. The portal also has two carvings by Luchino Bianchino. The two great marble lions supporting the archivolt columns were carved in 1281 by Giambono da Bissone. Between the central and the right doors is the tomb of the mathematician Biagio Pelacani, who died in 1416.

The Gothic belfry, topped by a gilt copper angel, was added later, in 1284–1294: a twin construction on the left side had been conceived, but it was never begun. Beside the Cathedral lies the octagonal Baptistery of Parma.

== Interior ==
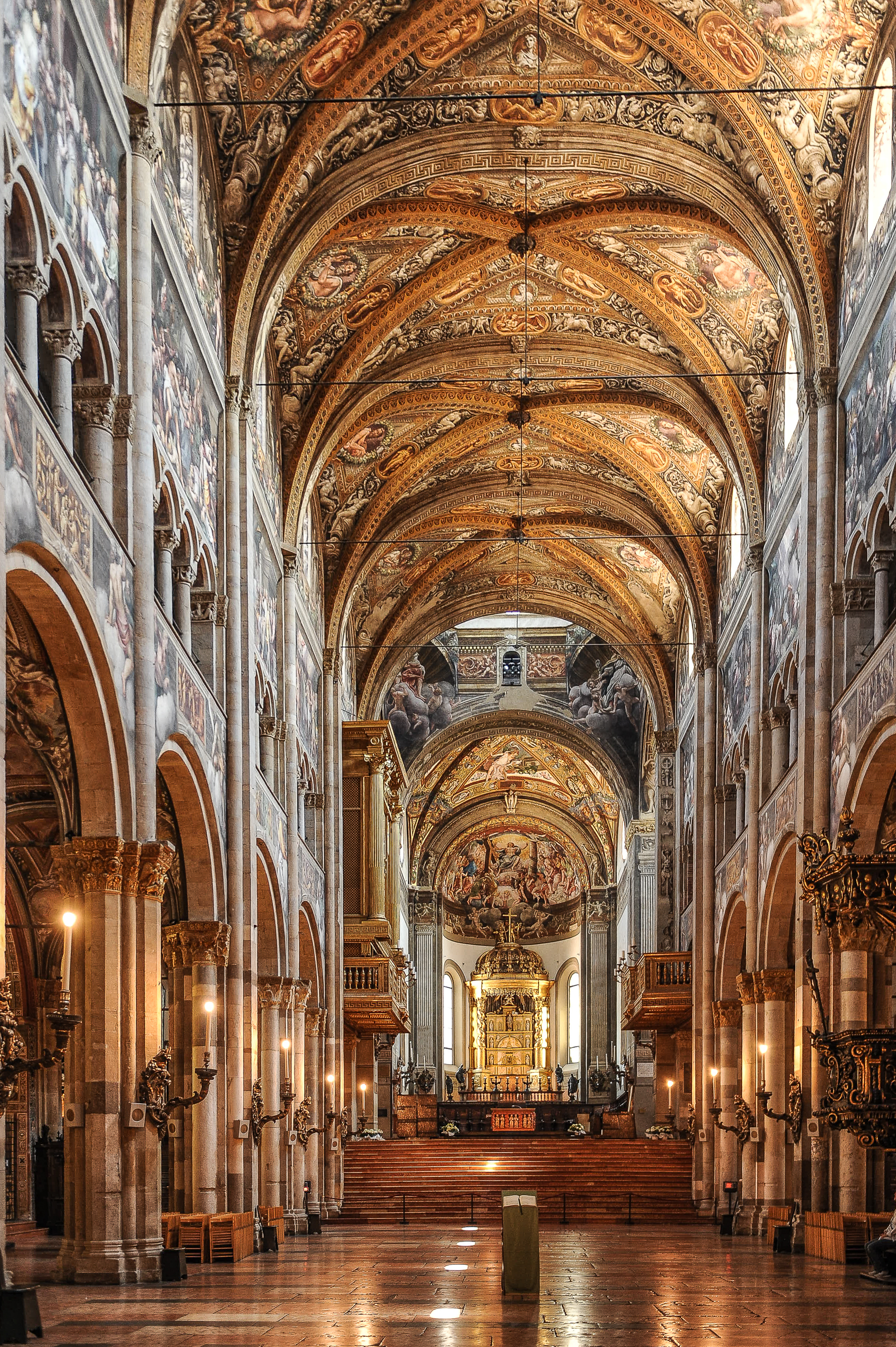
Interior

The interior has a Latin cross plan, with a nave and two aisles divided by pilasters. The presbytery and the transept are elevated, to allow space for the underlying crypt. Particularly noteworthy are the capitals; many of them are characterized by rich decorations with leaves, mythological figures, scenes of war, as well as Biblical and Gospel scenes.

The cycle of frescoes in the nave and apse walls are by Lattanzio Gambara and Bernardino Gatti. Along the nave, in the lunettes above the spans are monochrome frescoes of Old Testament stories, as well as event of the passion. This culminates in the apse, frescoed with "Christ, Mary, Saints, and Angels in Glory" (1538–1544) by Girolamo Mazzola Bedoli. The main feature of the interior is the fresco of Assumption of the Virgin decorating the dome, executed by Correggio in 1526–1530.

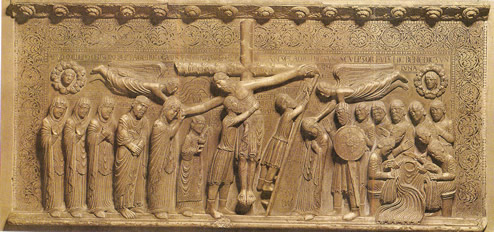
"Deposition", by Antelami

A 16th century red Verona marble staircase leads up to the transepts. In the right transept is the Deposition, a bas-relief by Benedetto Antelami (1178). It originally was part of the ambo. The sacristy contains works attributed to Luchino Bianchini (1491). There are four reliefs by Benedetto Antelami, from 1178.

The side chapels were built to house the sepulchres of the noble families of Parma: two of them, the Valeri Chapel and the Commune Chapel, have maintained the original decoration from the 14th century. The Valeri Chapel is located on the left; its 15th-century frescoes are attributed to the studio of Bertolino de'Grossi. The frescoes in the Capella del Comune on the right, presumably by the same hands, were painted after the plague of 1410–11, and dedicated to Saint Sebastian.

The crypt fragments of ancient mosaics which show the presence here of a cult temple from at least the 3rd or 4th century AD. The Crypt has a monument to Saint Bernardo di Uberti, bishop of Parma 1106–1133, patron of the diocese. The monument, executed in 1544 by Prospero Clementi and Girolamo Clementi on the design of Mazzola Bèdoli. The Rusconi chapel located at the right of the crypt contains elegant frescoes commissioned by Bishop Giovanni Rusconi in 1398. The Ravacaldi chapel has frescoes attributed to the studio of Bertolino de'Grassi.

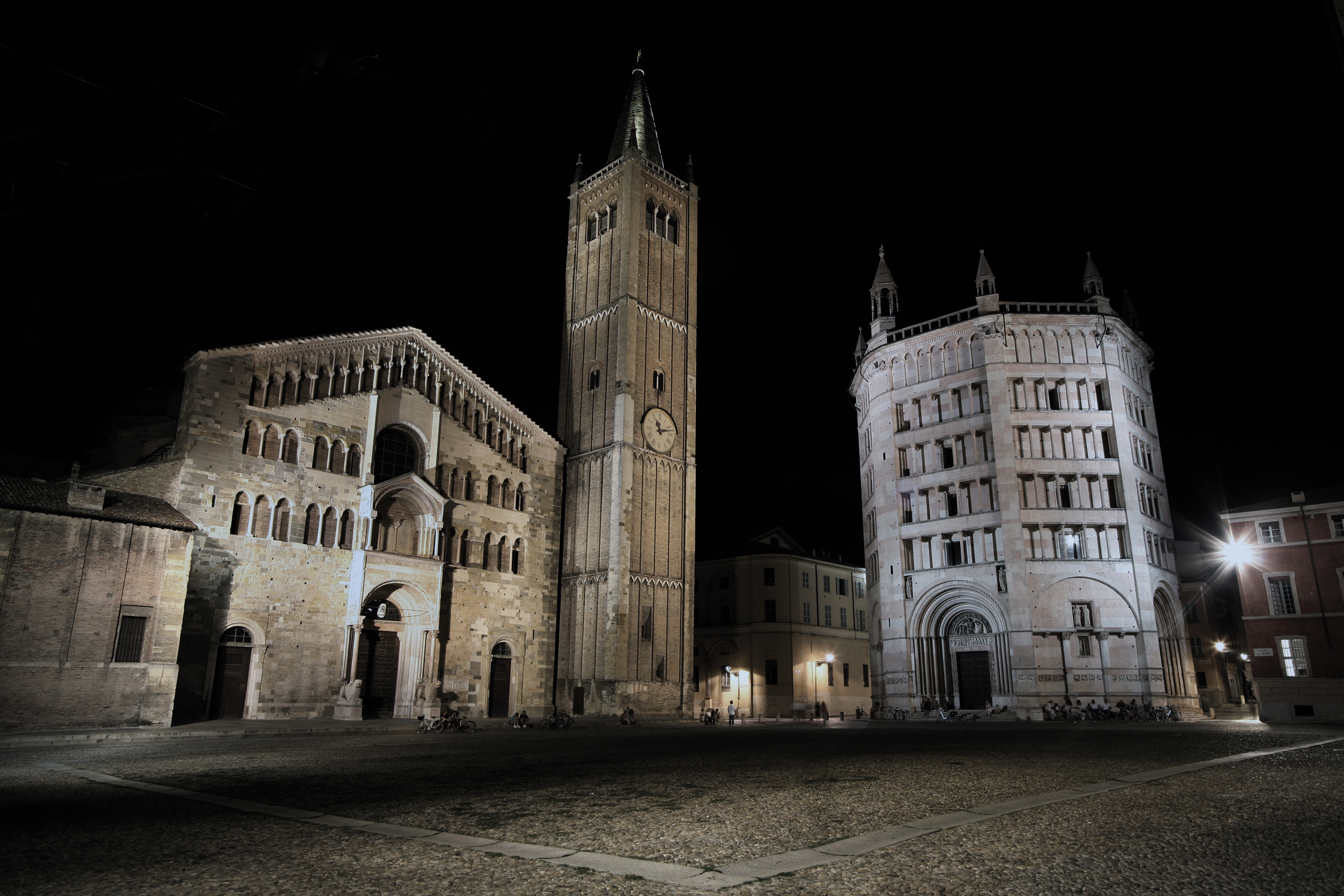
Piazza Duomo Parma 2009

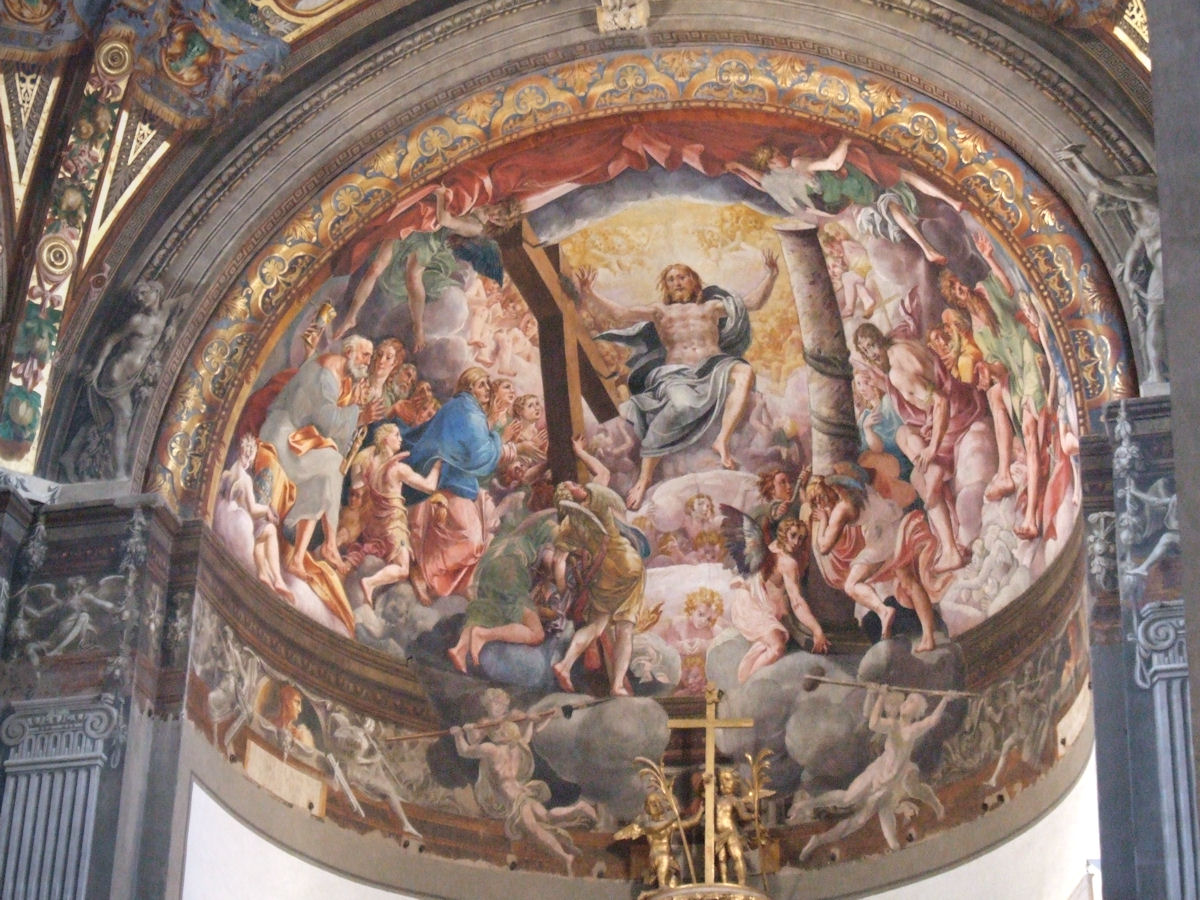
apse

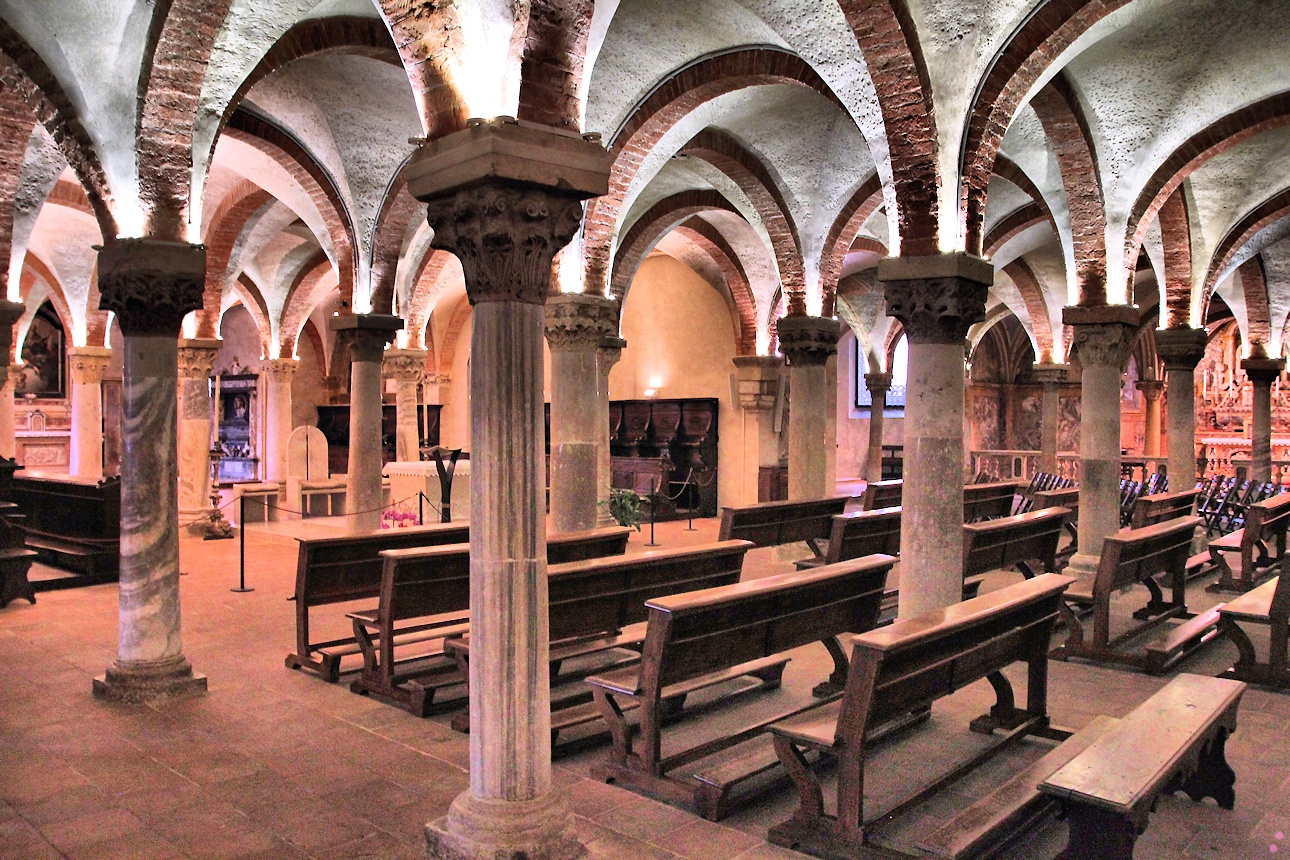
crypt

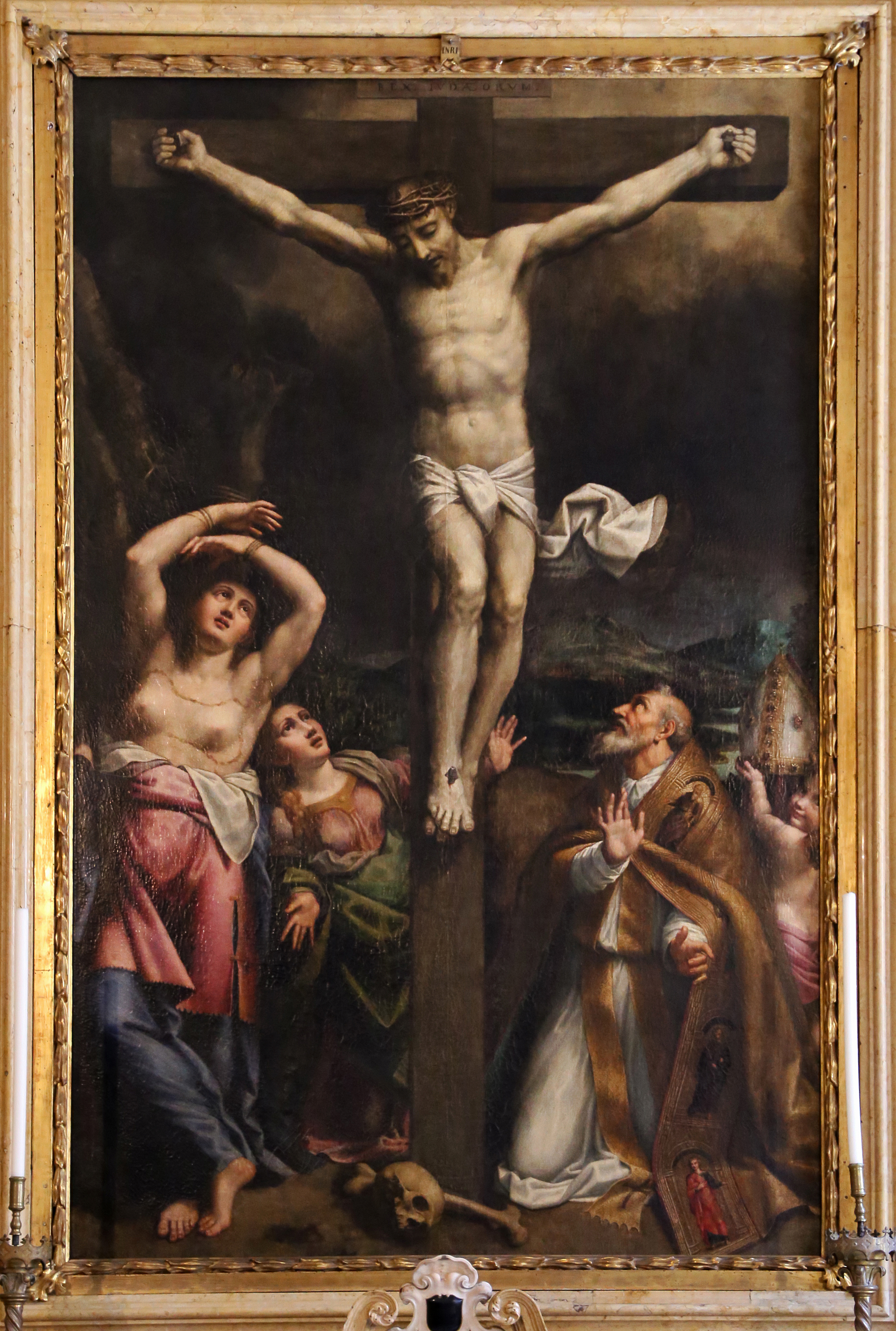
Crocifissione, Bernardino Gatti

== See also ==
- High medieval domes

== Bibliography ==
- Pauluzzi F. (1894). Il duomo di Parma e i suoi arcipreti. Udine, tip. del Patronato. 1894. (in Italian)
