= Santa Maria Annunziata, Fidenza =

Church building in Fidenza, Italy

Coordinates: 44°51′57.9″N 10°3′45.2″E

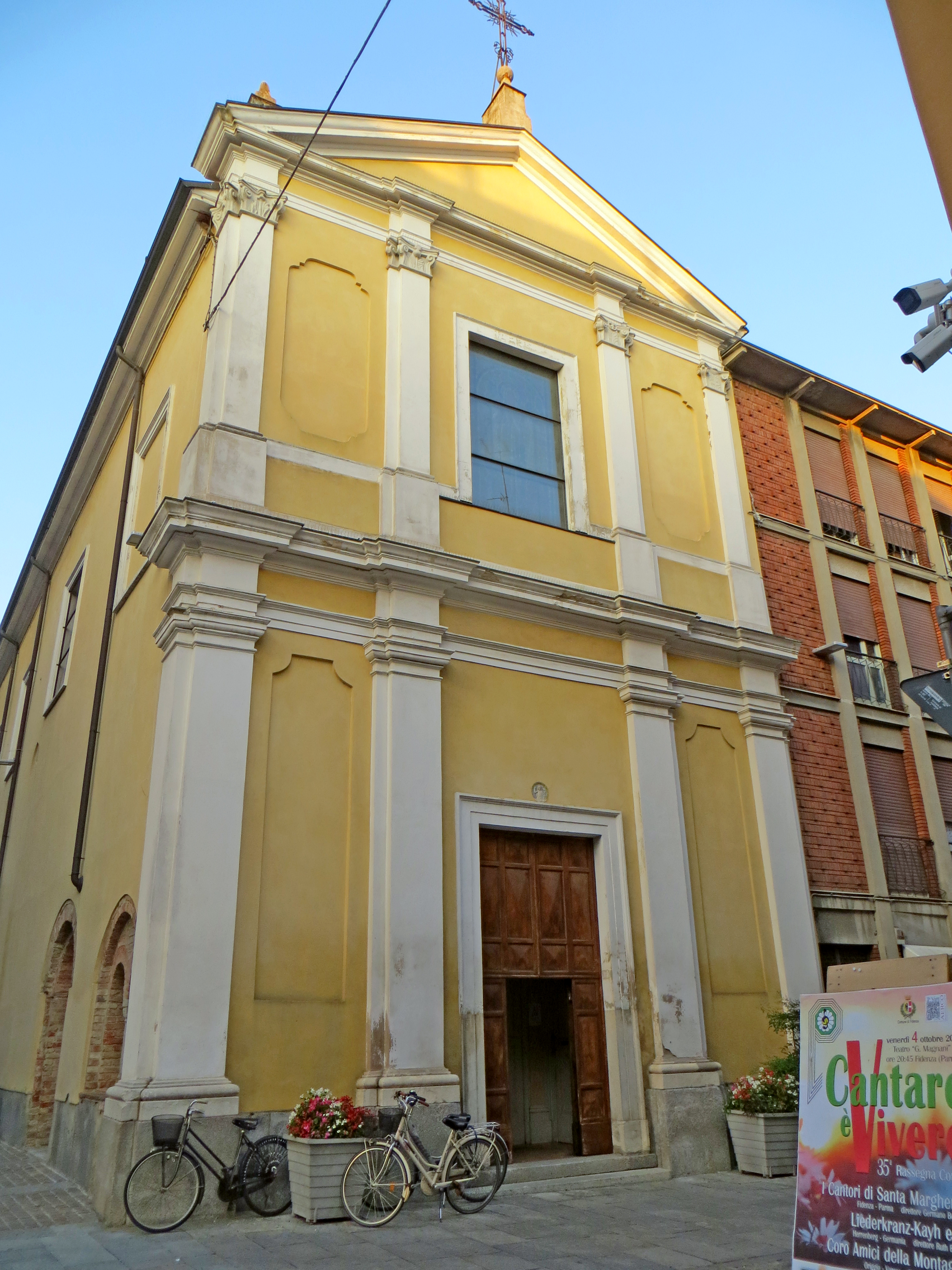
Church of Santa Maria Annunziata (Fidenza) - facade

Santa Maria Annunziata is a Baroque-style, Roman Catholic church located in the town of Fidenza, Province of Parma, Italy.

A chapel at the site is documented since 1230, erected under the patronage of the aristocratic Pinchelini (Pincolini) family. In the 15th century, a hospital arose adjacent to the chapel, dedicated to caring for the pilgrims called mysteriously in some documents "degli Scoatti" (Scivatorum, Scopatorum). Later the church was assigned to the Flagellant Confraternity of the Disciplinati, who were devoted to the Virgin of the Annunciation. The church was rebuilt in 1600. When the hospice and confraternity were suppressed by Pope Pius VI in 1778, the property was transferred to the hospital of the city. However, in 1785, with the closure of the church of Santi Giovanni Battista e Giovanni Evangelista, this was converted into a parish church. The interiors were frescoed in the 17th century by Antonio Formaiaroli. In 1970, the nave was elongated.
