= Fidenza =

Fidenza Bùragh (Emilian)
- Comune
- Città di Fidenza
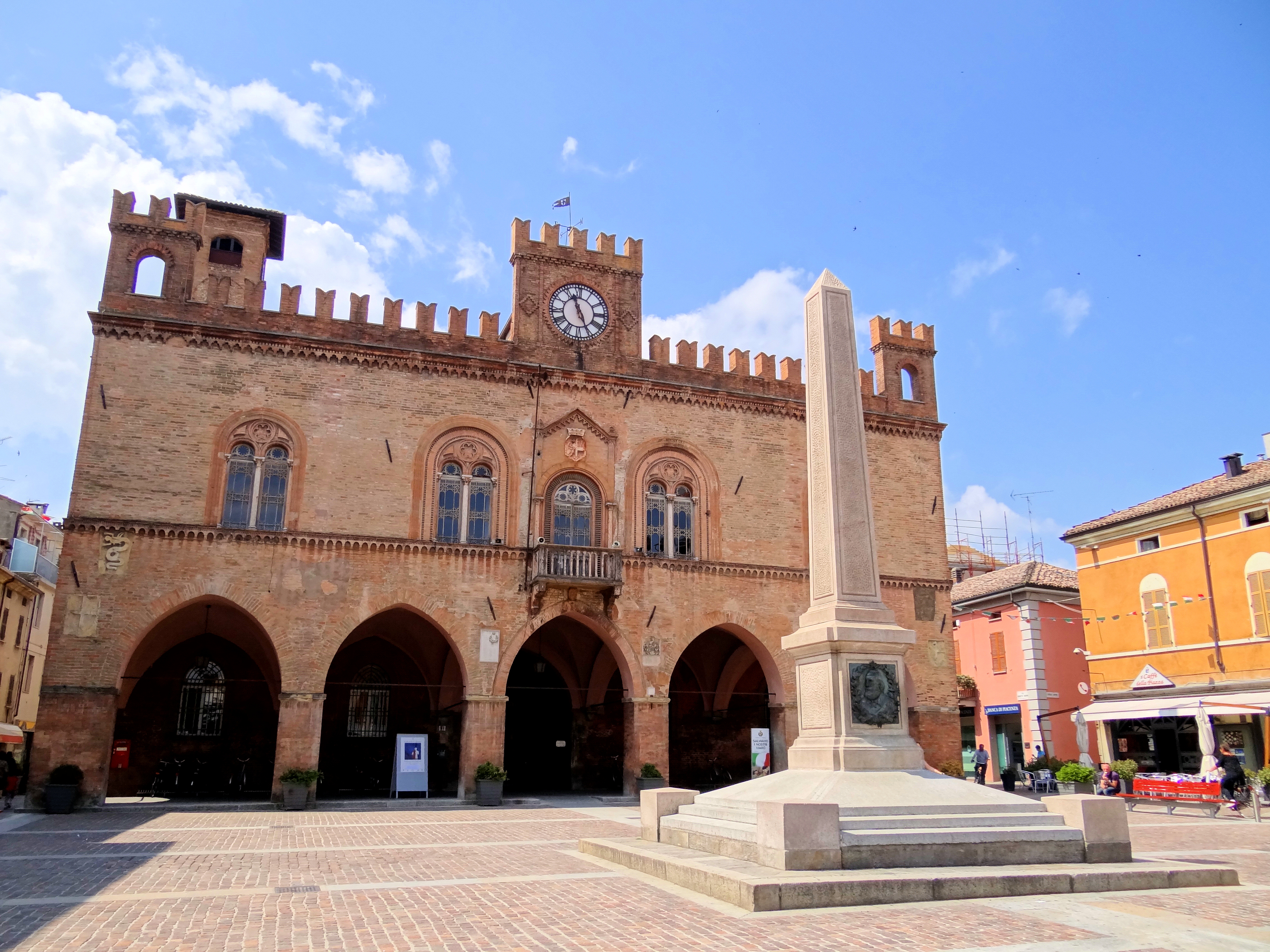
- Town Hall and Garibaldi Obelisk

- Flag Coat of arms

- Location within Italy Location within Emilia-Romagna
- Coordinates: 44°52′N 10°04′E
- Country: Italy
- Region: Emilia-Romagna
- Province: Parma (PR)
- Frazioni: Bastelli, Cabriolo, Castione Marchesi, Chiusa Ferranda, Chiusa Viarola, Cogolonchio, Fornio, Monfestone, Osteria Pietralunga, Parola, Pieve Cusignano, Ponte Ghiara, Rimale, San Faustino, Santa Margherita, Siccomonte

Government
  - Mayor: Davide Malvisi

Area
  - Total: 95 km^{2} (37 sq mi)
- Elevation: 75 m (246 ft)

Population (31 July 2017)
  - Total: 26,859
  - Density: 280/km^{2} (730/sq mi)
- Demonym: Fidentino or Borghigiano
- Time zone: UTC+1 (CET)
  - Summer (DST): UTC+2 (CEST)
- Postal code: 43036
- Dialing code: 0524
- Patron saint: St. Domninus of Fidenza
- Saint day: October 9
- Website: Official website

Fidenza (Parmigiano: Fidénsa, locally Bùragh) is a town and comune (municipality) in the province of Parma, in the Emilia-Romagna region of Italy. It has around 27,000 inhabitants. The town was renamed Fidenza in 1927, recalling its Roman name of Fidentia; before, it was called Borgo San Donnino (Parmigiano: Bórgh San Donén).

== History ==
The town originates from a Roman camp (Fidentia) founded on the place where the Ananes Gauls had their settlement of Vicumvia (Latin: Victumviae or Victumulae). In 41 BC, it received the Roman citizenship and became a municipium.

In the 5th century, it was destroyed by Constantine I. From 1092 to 1100, Borgo San Donnino was the seat of King Conrad II of Italy. In the same year, it became a commune, confirmed in 1162 by Emperor Frederick Barbarossa, who entrusted it to the Pallavicino family of Piacenza. In 1199, it was conquered by Parma, but was freed in 1221 by Frederick II of Hohenstaufen. In 1268 the city was however destroyed by the troops of Parma. It was rebuilt around 1300; from 1346 to 1447, it was under a discontinuous lordship of the Visconti of Milan. In 1449, it was conquered by the new Milanese lords, the Sforza, who held it until 1499.

After the date, it continued to change move to an autonomous state to the subjection to Parma until 1556, when it became part of the Duchy of Parma and Piacenza. After a period under France during the Napoleonic Wars, it was annexed to the Kingdom of Sardinia-Piedmont in 1859, during the unification of Italy.

The city underwent a large program of expansion during the Fascist government of Italy. It changed its name from Borgo Donnino to Fidenza in 1927. In May 1944, the city was bombed by Allied planes and nearly destroyed. In the Spring 1945, the German occupation troops perpetrated several massacres, such as that of the Carzole and of Via Baracca. It was conquered by the Allies on 26 April 1945.

== Main sights ==
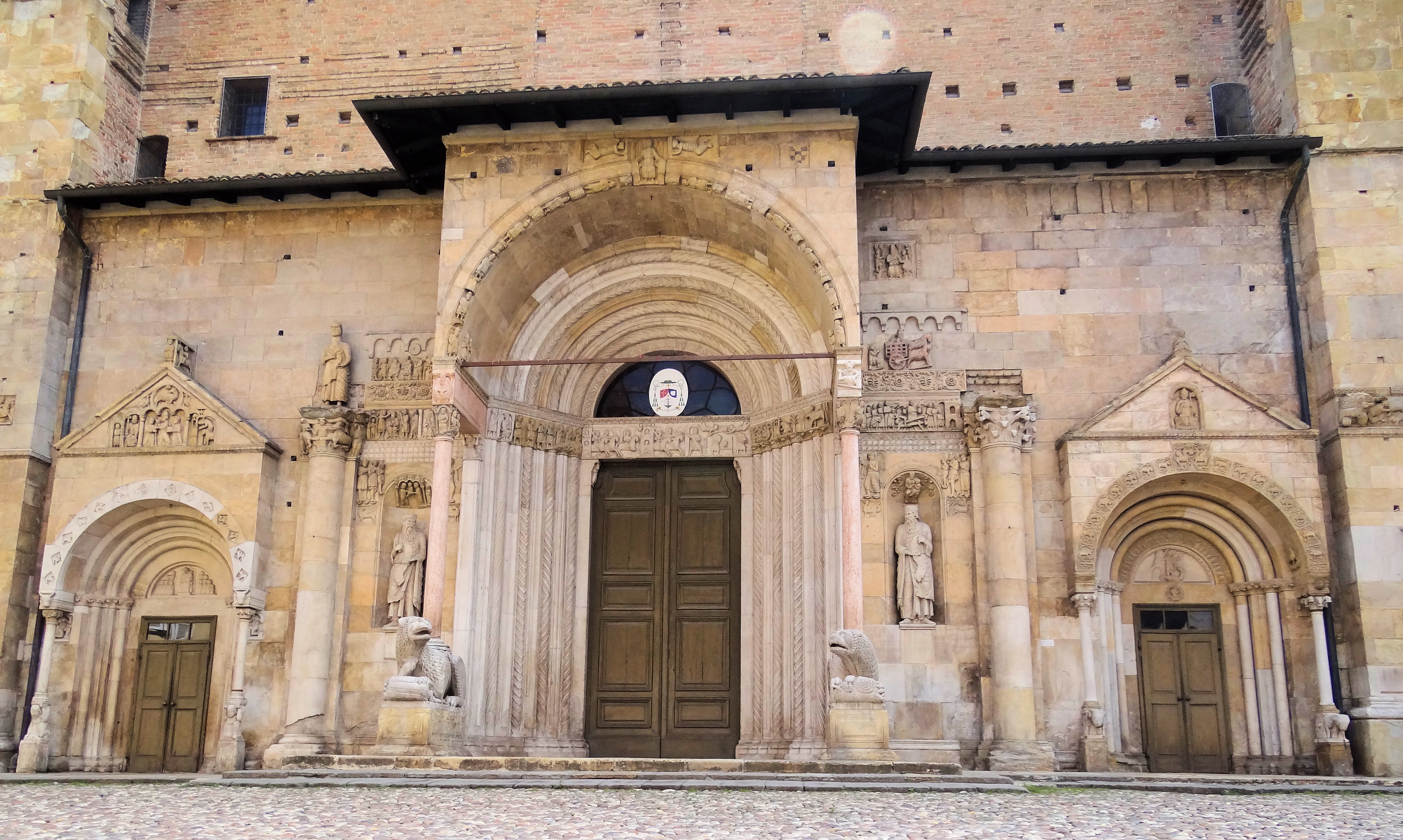
The lower part of the façade of the Fidenza Cathedral

The Fidenza Cathedral is the most prominent building, built in the 12th century and dedicated to Domninus of Fidenza, martyred by order of Maximian in 304 AD. The town's name prior to 1927, Borgo San Donnino, reflected its patron saint.

The lower part of the cathedral facade exemplifies Lombard-Romanesque church architecture and decoration of the 11th to 13th centuries. The three stone portals are garlanded with statuary, including two saints by Benedetto Antelami and bas-reliefs depicting the Histories of St Domninus. The statue at the front of the cathedral of the apostle Simon Peter is famous for its pointing in the direction of Rome, held in the left hand is an inscription reading "I show you the way to Rome", thus said to be one of the world's first road signs. The interior remains simple and well-proportioned, not tarnished by restoration. Enrichetta d'Este, Duchess of Parma is buried here.

- Remnants of Fidenza's medieval period cluster near the cathedral, including Porta San Donnino, the only surviving medieval gate, built in 1364 by the Visconti rulers.
- Sant'Antonio Abate: 12th century Romanesque-style church.
- Santa Margherita: 12th century Romanesque-style church.
- Santa Maria Annunziata: 13th century Baroque-style church.
- Palazzo Comunale: medieval town hall, documented since 1191. The current structure dates from the 14th century, but the façade was added in the 19th century. After being destroyed by Spanish and French troops during the Italian Wars, it was rebuilt and enlarged.

== Sport ==
AC Fidenza 1922 is the local football club, playing in Serie D.

== Twin towns ==
Fidenza is twinned with:

- Canterbury, United Kingdom
- Herrenberg, Germany
- Kremnica, Slovakia
- Sisteron, France
