= Santa Margherita, Fidenza =

Church in Fidenza, Italy

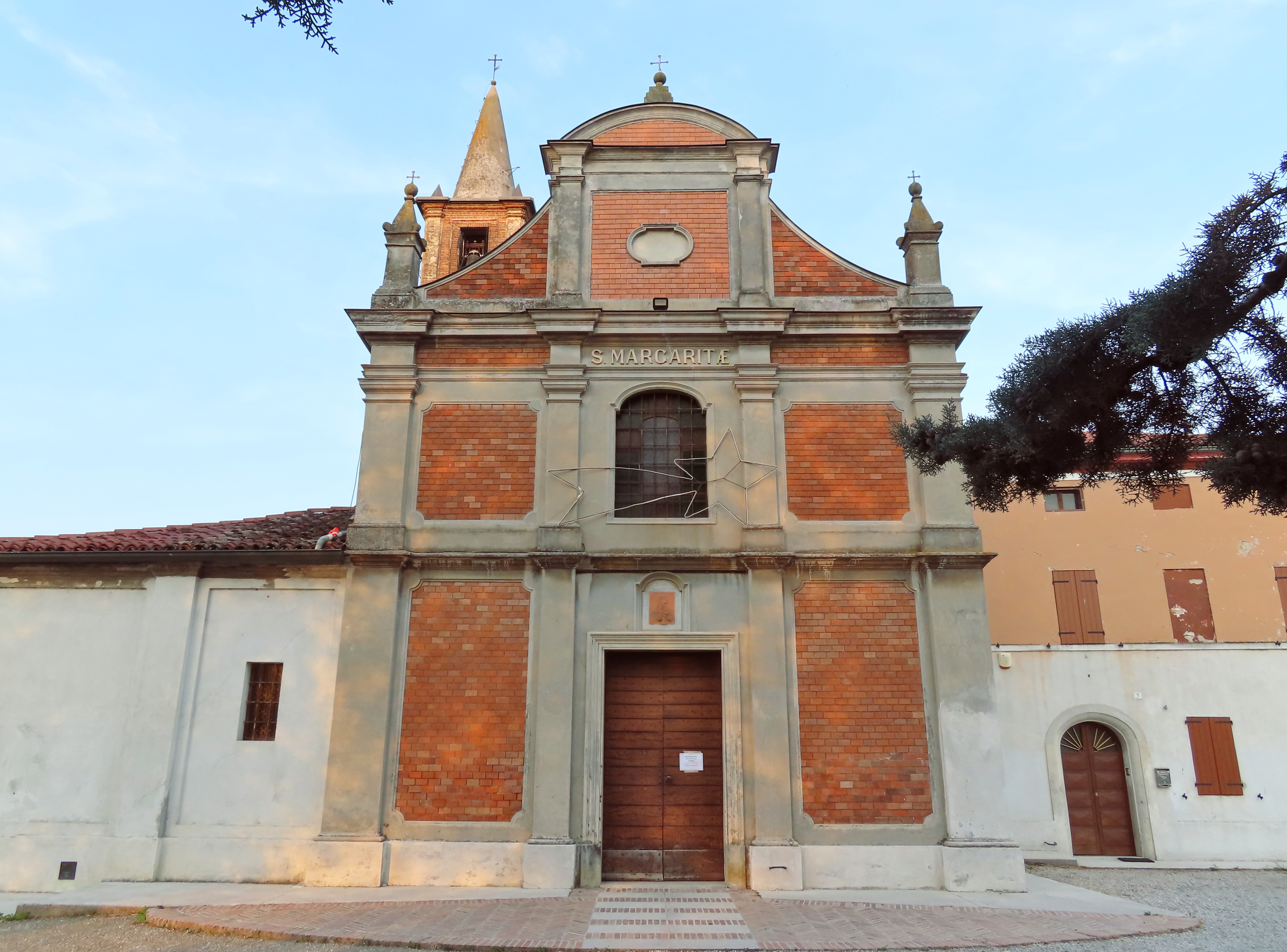
Façade

Santa Margherita or Santa Margherita Vergine e Martire is a Roman Catholic church Fidenza, Province of Parma, Italy.

A church at the site is documented since 1172 in a papal document sent from Pope Celestine III to the head of the nearby church of San Donnino. By 1477, it was a parish church. The structure today was based on a Romanesque 15th century building with later refurbishments. Including chapels added in the 17th century.
