= San Donnino, Bologna =

Church building in Bologna, Italy

Coordinates: 44.5091°N 11.3804°E

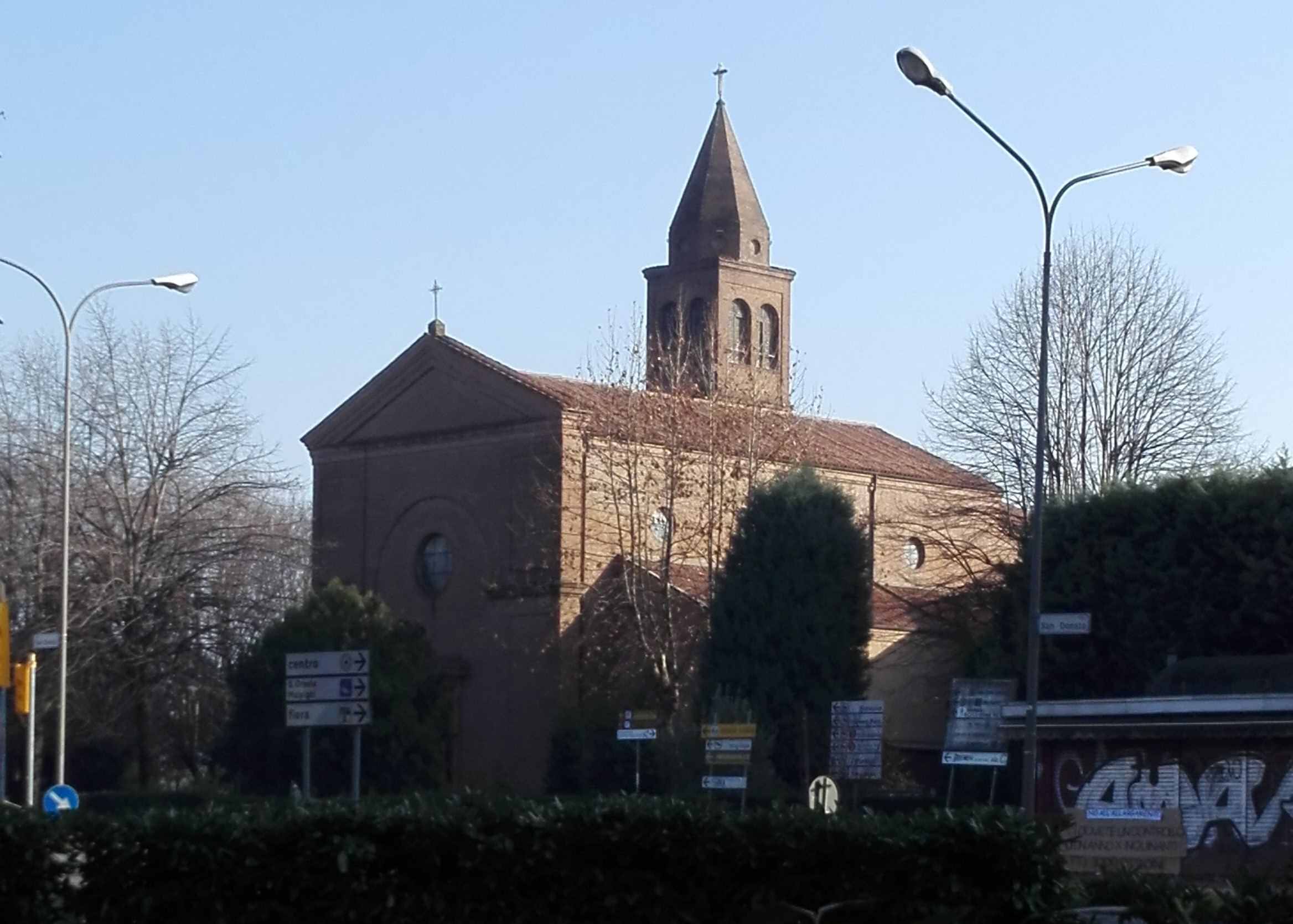
San Donnino esterno.jpg

San Donnino is a Roman Catholic parish church located on Via San Donnino in Bologna, Italy.

== History ==
The church is dedicated to Saint Domninus of Fidenza. A church at the site is documented from 1206. The bell-tower dated from 1399. The church was rebuilt in 1707 but destroyed during World War II. The present church was rebuilt in 1954–55 by the architect Pietro Bolognesi. The main altarpiece is a Madonna and child in Glory donated in 1956 to the church by Annibale Gozzadini.
