= Sant'Antonio Abate, Fidenza =

Church in Fidenza, Italy

Coordinates: 44°52′07″N 10°03′09″E

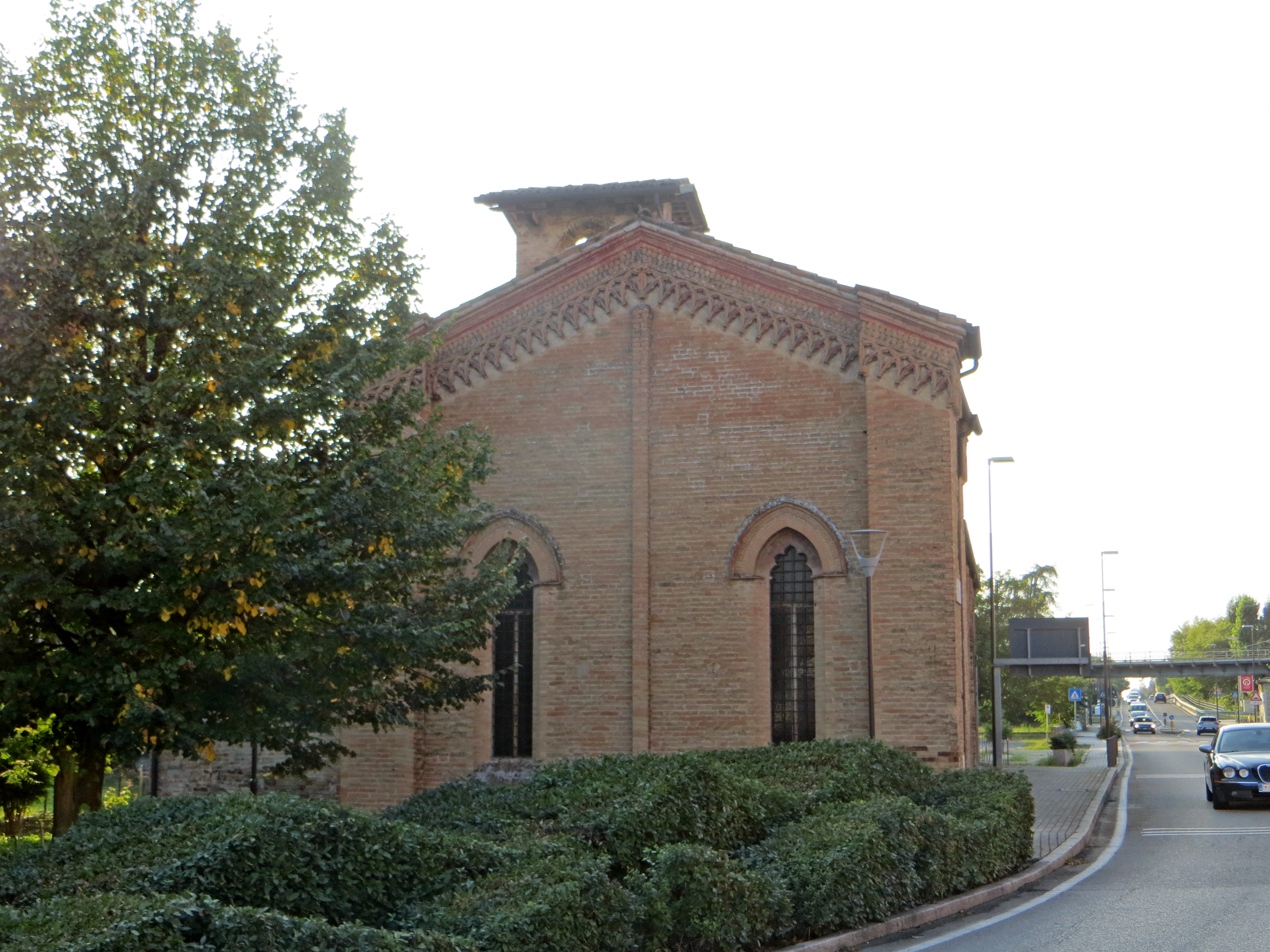

Sant'Antonio Abate is a Romanesque-style, Roman Catholic church in Fidenza, province of Parma, region of Emilia-Romagna, northern Italy.

The church was built in the 12th century as part of a hospice and monastery on the pilgrimage route of Via Aemilia. It was previously called Chiesa di San Faustino since it took over the parish of an earlier church dedicated to the holy martyrs Faustinus and Jovita. While the layout and internal pilasters are Romanesque, the windows are narrow and Gothic in style.
