= Parma Baptistery =

Religious edifice in Parma, Italy

Coordinates: 44°48′11″N 10°19′49″E

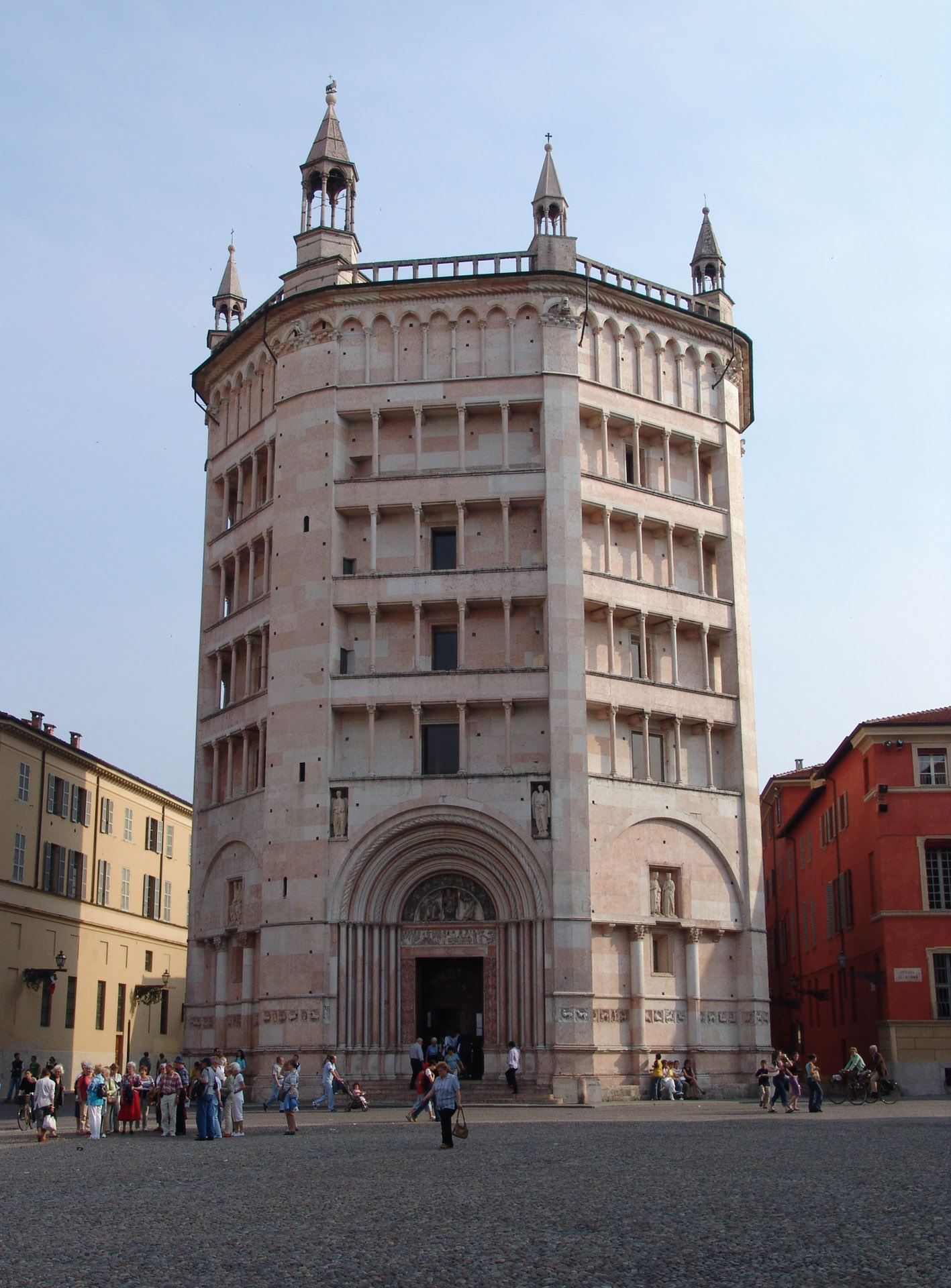
The Baptistery of Parma.

The Baptistery of Parma (Italian: Battistero di Parma) is a religious edifice in Parma, northern Italy. Architecturally, the baptistery of Parma Cathedral marks a transition between the Romanesque and Gothic styles, and it is considered to be among the most important Medieval monuments in Europe.

== Description ==
The city council of Parma commissioned Benedetto Antelami to build the baptistery in 1196. The attachment of the citizens to the project was tactile. Men put stones in the foundation to commemorate their families.

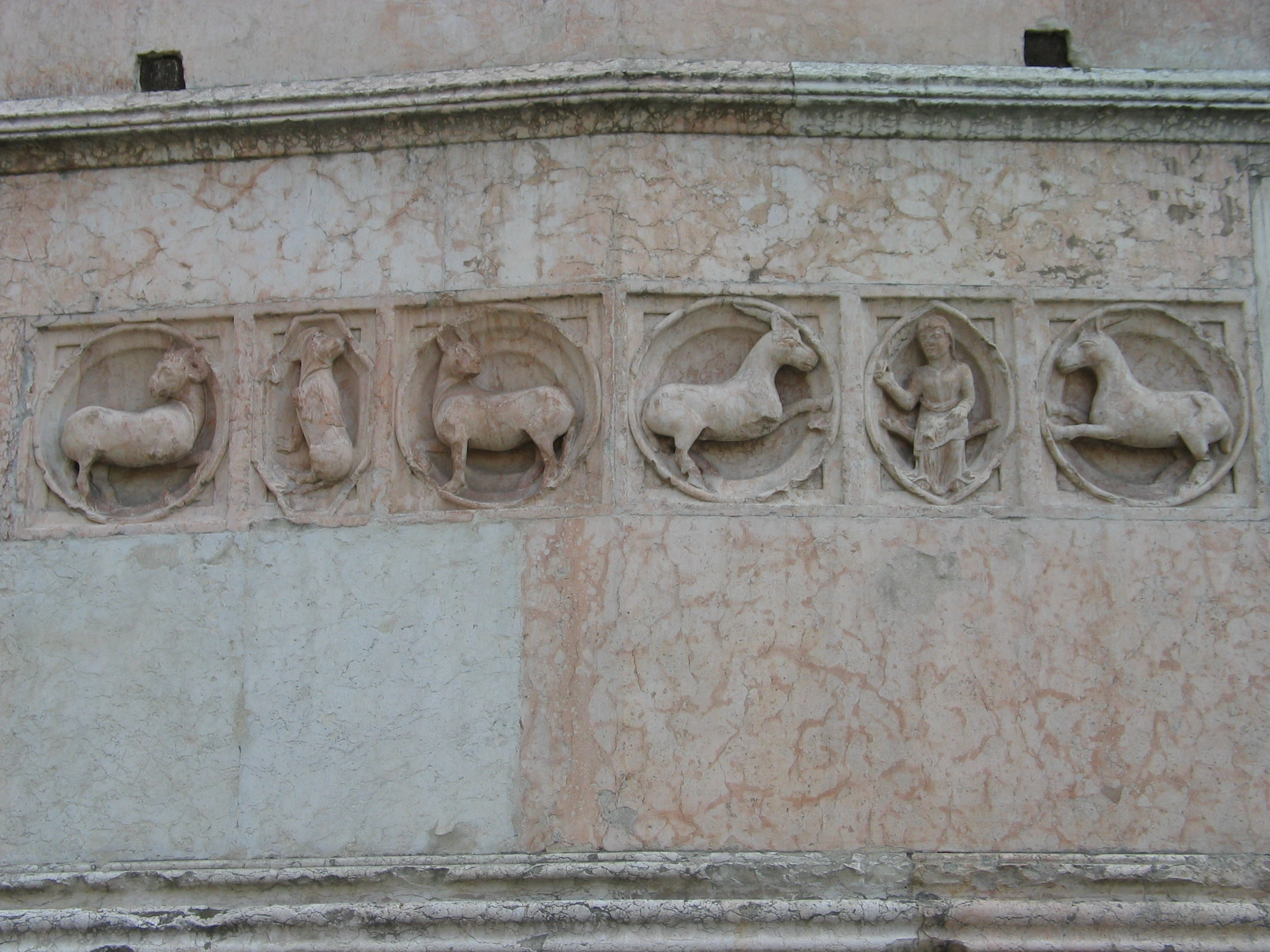
Facade reliefs

The outside of pink Verona marble is octagonal with four tiers of open loggias. Eight turrets crown the top of the building. In May 2022 the tallest underwent a 3D aerial scan to support conservation work.

The lowest part of the baptistery is encircled with bas-relief sculptures of animals, fabulous beasts, sea monsters, centaurs, mermaids, and unicorns.

The "Portal of the Virgin" faces north and overlooks the Piazza del Duomo. It is named after the figure of the Virgin and Child in the lunette above it. The door is decorated with scenes of the Adoration of the Magi and an angel instructing Joseph to flee to Egypt. The Bishop used to make his solemn entrance through here. The "Portal of Judgment" faces west. The lunette above depicts the Redeemer sitting on a throne. The "Portale della Vita" or Door of Life faces south, and the scene in its lunette shows a man eating honey in a tree.

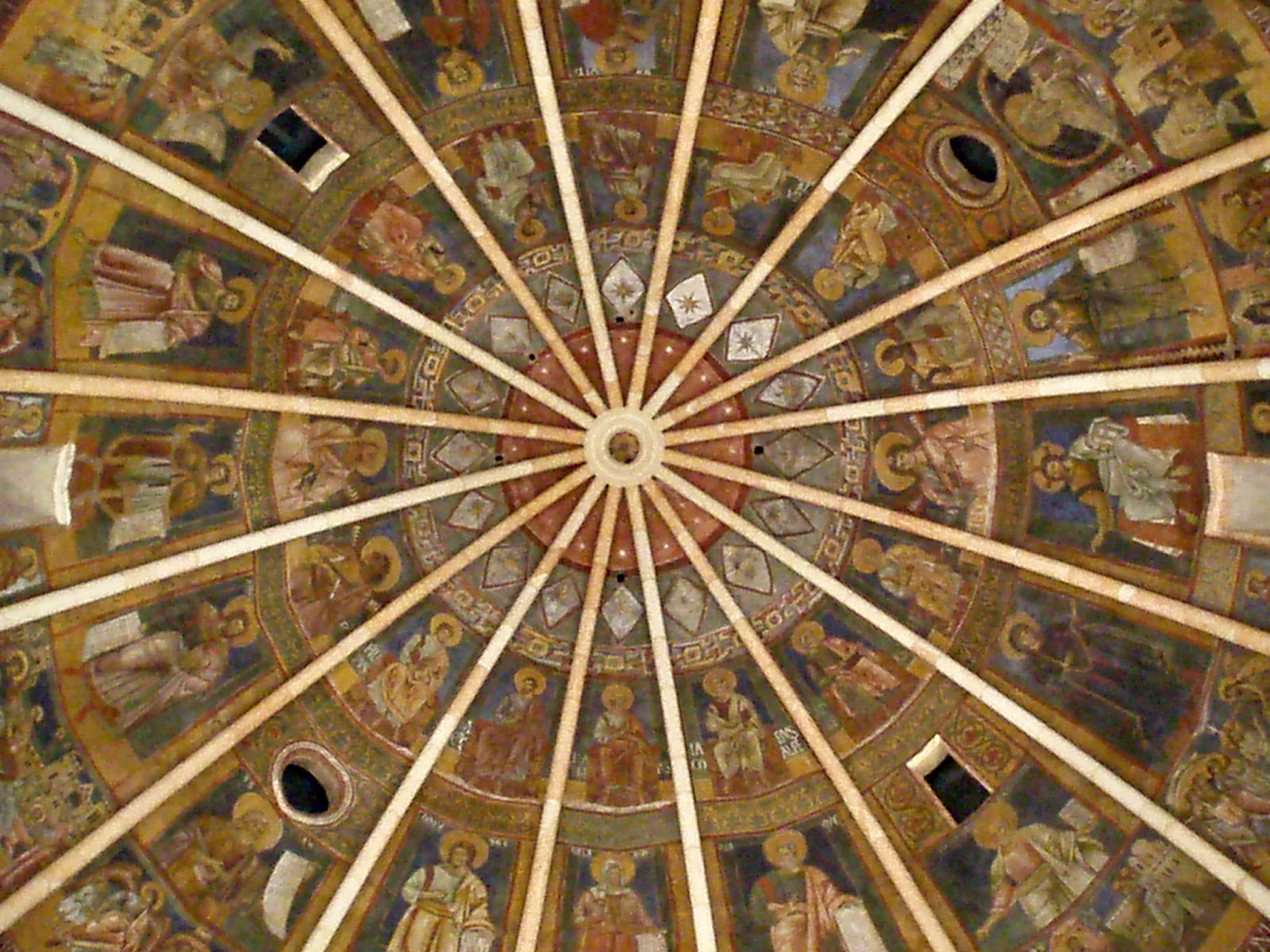
The middle of the painted ceiling.

The most striking part of the Baptistery is its painted domed ceiling. The vault is divided into six concentric horizontal bands, with a different series of frescoes in each. The red circle in the middle represents the upper heaven. Sixteen rays come down from the keystone, each corresponding to an arch. The lower part of the interior contains sixteen arches, forming alcoves each containing a painted scene. All these are 13th and 14th century frescoes and paintings, many as ex votos.

The large, octagonal baptismal basin stands the center. Made of Verona marble, it was designed for baptism by immersion. A baptismal font, located in the south-western niche, has been used for baptism by affusion since the 14th century. An altar in marble is located in the eastern apsidal niche. Above the altar, in the semi-dome, is a "Christ in Glory" surrounded by the symbols of the four evangelists and two angels.

== See also ==
- Baptistery
- Cathedral of Parma
- Parma
- High medieval domes
