= Benedetto Antelami =

Italian sculptor

Benedetto Antelami (c. 1150 – c. 1230) was an Italian architect and sculptor of the Romanesque school, whose "sculptural style sprang from local north Italian traditions that can be traced back to late antiquity". He is chiefly known for three carved doorways and the allegorical figures and prophets that decorate the Parma Baptistery.

== Life ==
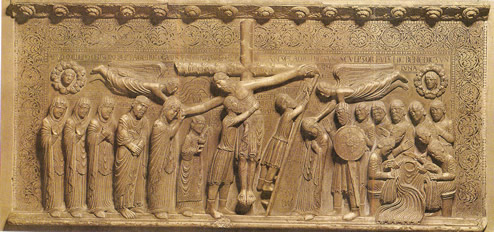
Deposition, 1178 (Duomo of Parma).

Little is known about his life. He was probably originally from Lombardy, perhaps born in Val d'Intelvi, near Como or in Genoa, where a group of artists originally from the Intelvi Valley operated in the 12th century. "Antelami" is not a surname, but a place-name used to denote skilled workers in sculpture and stone working from the Intelvi Valley just north of Como. It is believed from the Provençal style of his art that he served as an apprentice at the Church of St. Trophime, in Arles.

=== Parma ===
His earliest recorded work is at Parma Cathedral, where in 1178 he executed a bas-relief of the Deposition from the Cross, originally part of the ambo. His name and the date are inscribed in the work, which, in addition to the Provençal element, shows both classical and Byzantine influence.

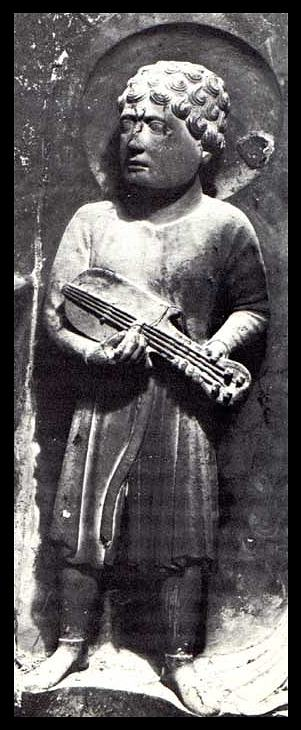
Citole player, Baptistry of Parma, c. 1180

Later, in 1196, he worked on the sculptural decoration of the Baptistry of Parma, a building of which he was probably also the architect. Here, between 1196 and 1214, he made the lunettes of the three portals: on the outside portraying the Adoration of the Magi, the Last Judgement and an allegory of life, and on the inside the Flight into Egypt, the Presentation at the Temple and David playing the harp.

Also on the interiors can be seen alto-relievo personifications of the months and the seasons. These were probably intended for a portal on the facade of the Cathedral, but the work was interrupted by Antelami’s death.

There are remarkable stylistic similarities with figures on the outer arch of the north porch at Chartres Cathedral in France in 1213. His trademark is relief carvings emphasizing design by means of drapery details on elongate figures and tight compositions.

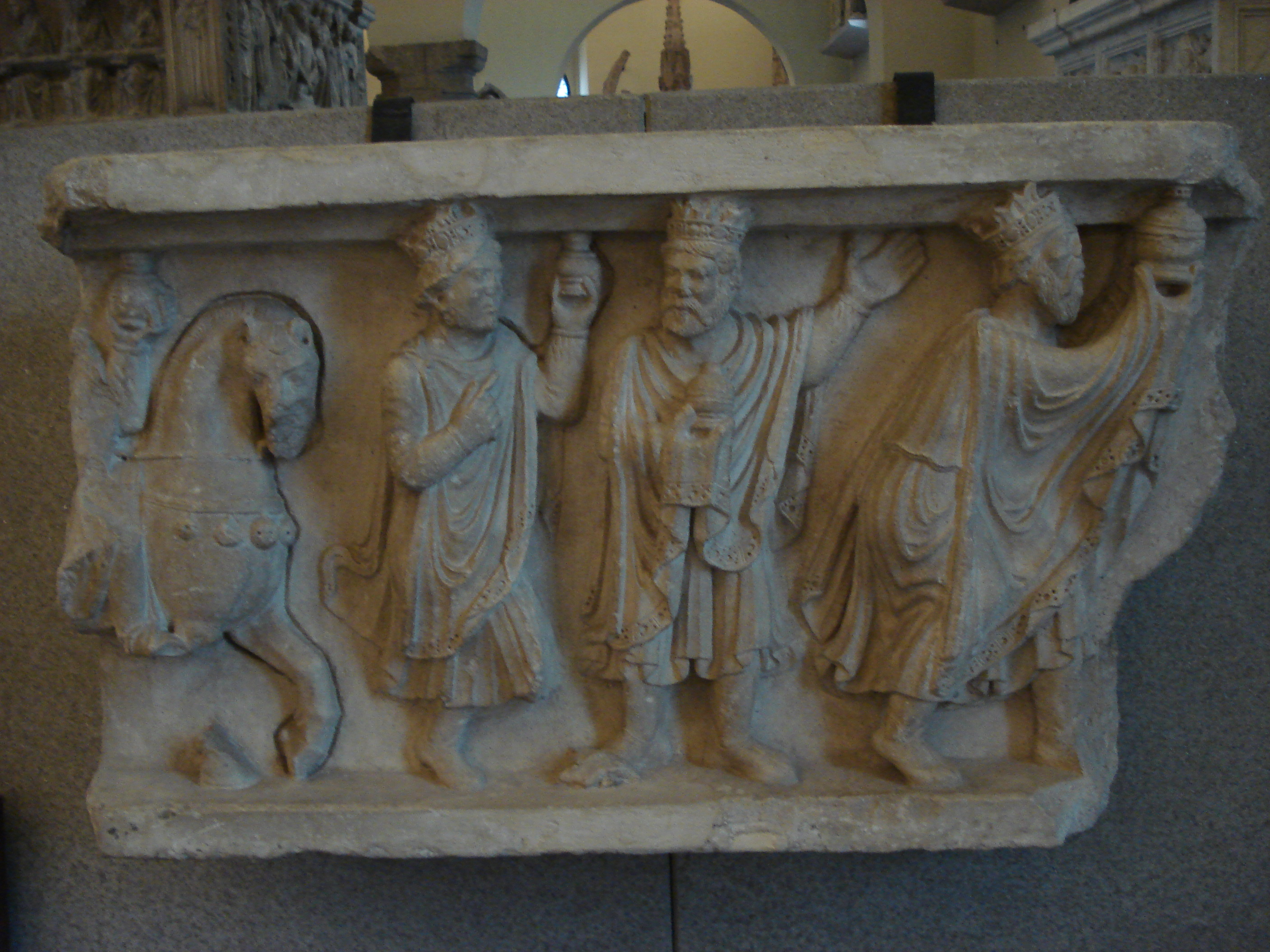
Three Wise Men, Museo d'Arte Antica in Milan.

=== Borgo San Donnino ===
Presumably, he went traveling in his 50s, and this opens the possibility that more of his work may be found along the roads he may have taken. Benedetto's sculpture is also to be found in the Fidenza Cathedral, dedicated to Saint Domninus of Fidenza. Definitely to be attributed to Antelami is the construction of the lower and middle part of the Cathedral's facade, a facade that in the Antelamic project also included the two side towers, confirming that Antelami's plan is a French one. The lower facade includes a cycle of sculptures made largely by the workshop of Antelami between the late 12th and early 13th centuries. Antelami completed his portion of the work on the cathedral in 1207.

The main west door of the St. Mark's Basilica, Venice, is also attributed by some to Antelami or his school, and the current replacement version of the Holy Face of Lucca (the Volto Santo) is likewise ascribed to his circle.

== Sources ==
- Moritz Woelk: Benedetto Antelami – Die Werke in Parma und Fidenza. Rhema-Verlag, Münster 1995, ISBN 978-3-930454-01-3
