= Montecchio Emilia =

- Comune
- Comune di Montecchio Emilia
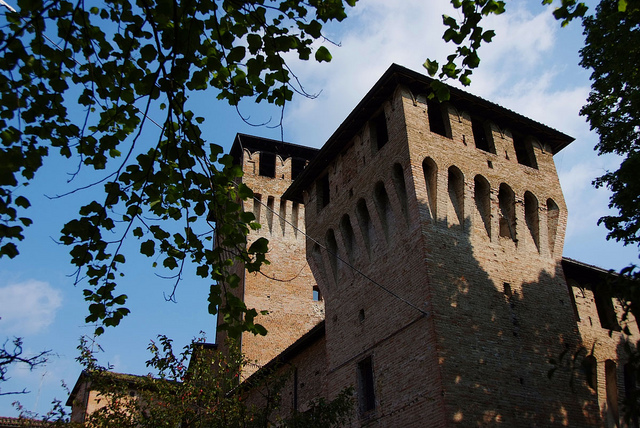
- Castle of Montecchio

- Location within Italy Location within Emilia-Romagna
- Coordinates: 44°41′N 10°26′E
- Country: Italy
- Region: Emilia-Romagna
- Province: Reggio Emilia (RE)
- Frazioni: Aiola, Braglia, Case Badodi, Case Gambetti, Case Pozzi, Cornocchio, Croce, Spadarotta

Government
  - Mayor: Fausto Torelli

Area
  - Total: 24.39 km^{2} (9.42 sq mi)
- Elevation: 99 m (325 ft)

Population (31 December 2016)
  - Total: 10,622
  - Density: 435.5/km^{2} (1,128/sq mi)
- Demonym: Montecchiesi
- Time zone: UTC+1 (CET)
  - Summer (DST): UTC+2 (CEST)
- Postal code: 42027
- Dialing code: 0522
- Website: Official website

Montecchio Emilia (Reggiano: Montè-c or Muntè-c) is a comune (municipality) in the Province of Reggio Emilia in the Italian region Emilia-Romagna, located about 70 kilometres (43 mi) northwest of Bologna and about 15 kilometres (9 mi) west of Reggio Emilia.

Montecchio Emilia borders the following municipalities: Bibbiano, Montechiarugolo, Cavriago, San Polo d'Enza, Sant'Ilario d'Enza. It is a largely industrial town located at nearly half the distance between Reggio and the other major nearby city, Parma.

== History ==
The area has been inhabited at least since the Early Bronze Age, as attested by the finding of the so-called Tazza d'Oro in the Cava Spalletti area: the artefact, dated between 1800 and 1700 BCE, is made entirely of gold and was probably buried and pressed as part of an unknown ritual practice. It is now conserved in the Museo Archeologico di Parma, in the comeplex of Palazzo della Pilotta.

In ancient times, it was called Monticulum, meaning "small mount" and referring to the hilly terrain formed by floods of the nearby river Enza. Traces of remains from as early as the Bronze Age (18th-17th centuries BC) have been found in the communal territory.

In the Middle Ages and early Modern times Montecchio (mentioned for the first time in a 781 diploma) was a fortified places contended between the Papal States, the Visconti of Milan, the Barbiano, the Sforza, the Gonzaga, the Farnese and then by Spain, France until, starting from the late Renaissance, it became part of the House of Este-held Duchy of Modena.

In 1859 it became part of the newly formed Italy as Montecchio Emilia.

On the 28 June 2008, Montecchio Emilia was conferred the title of 'city' by decree of the Presidente della Repubblica, Giorgo Napolitano.

== Main sights ==
- Church of San Donnino, built in Romanesque style in the 11th century but remade in 1596–1600.
- Sanctuary of Beata Vergine dell'olmo, in Baroque style
- Castle, mentioned for the first time in 1116 in a diploma by Matilde of Canossa.

== Notable people ==
• Nicolò Bulega (born 1999), motorcycle racer
