= Fidenza Cathedral =

Cathedral in Fidenza, Italy

Coordinates: 44.8665°N 10.0578°E

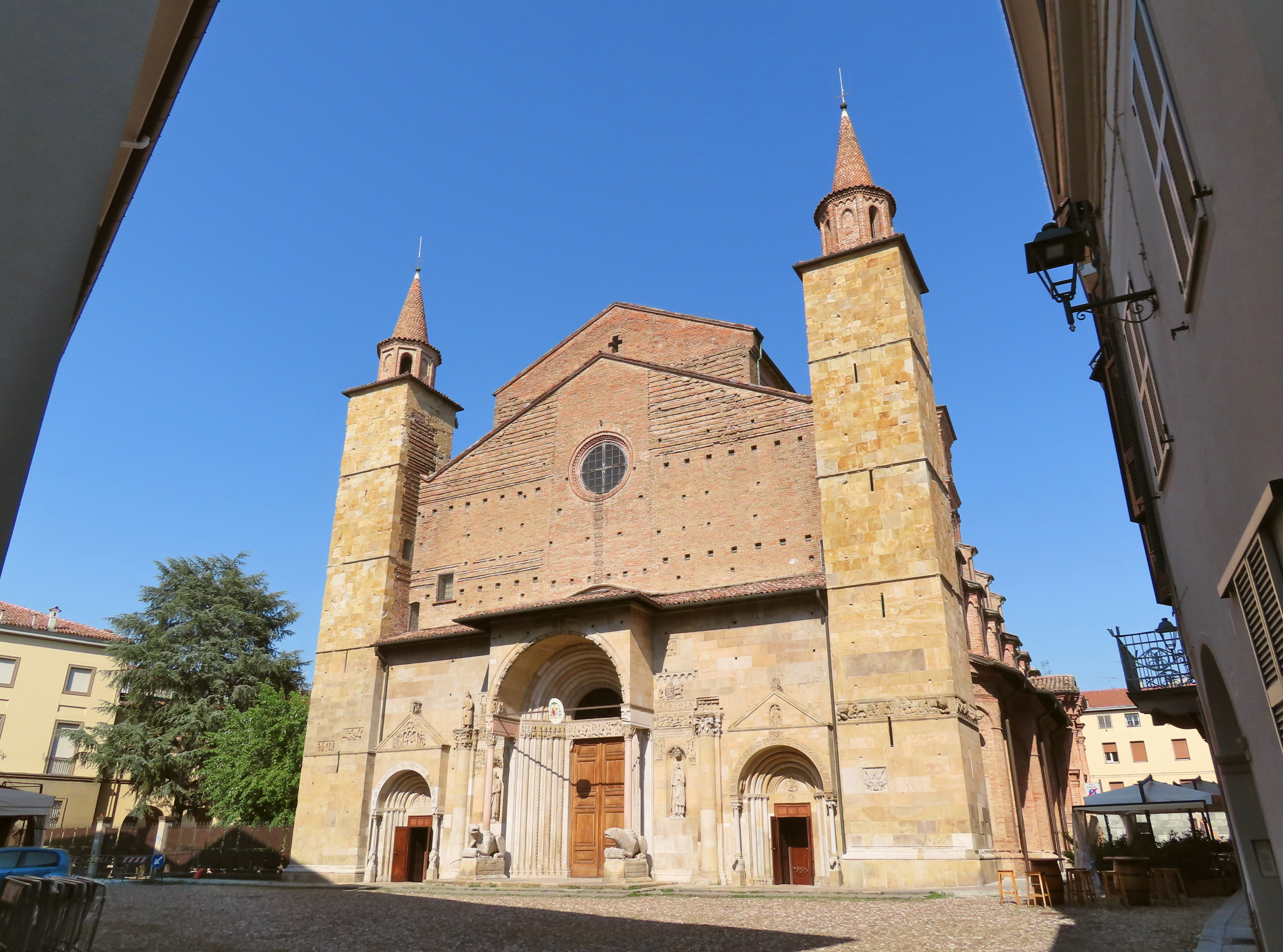
West front

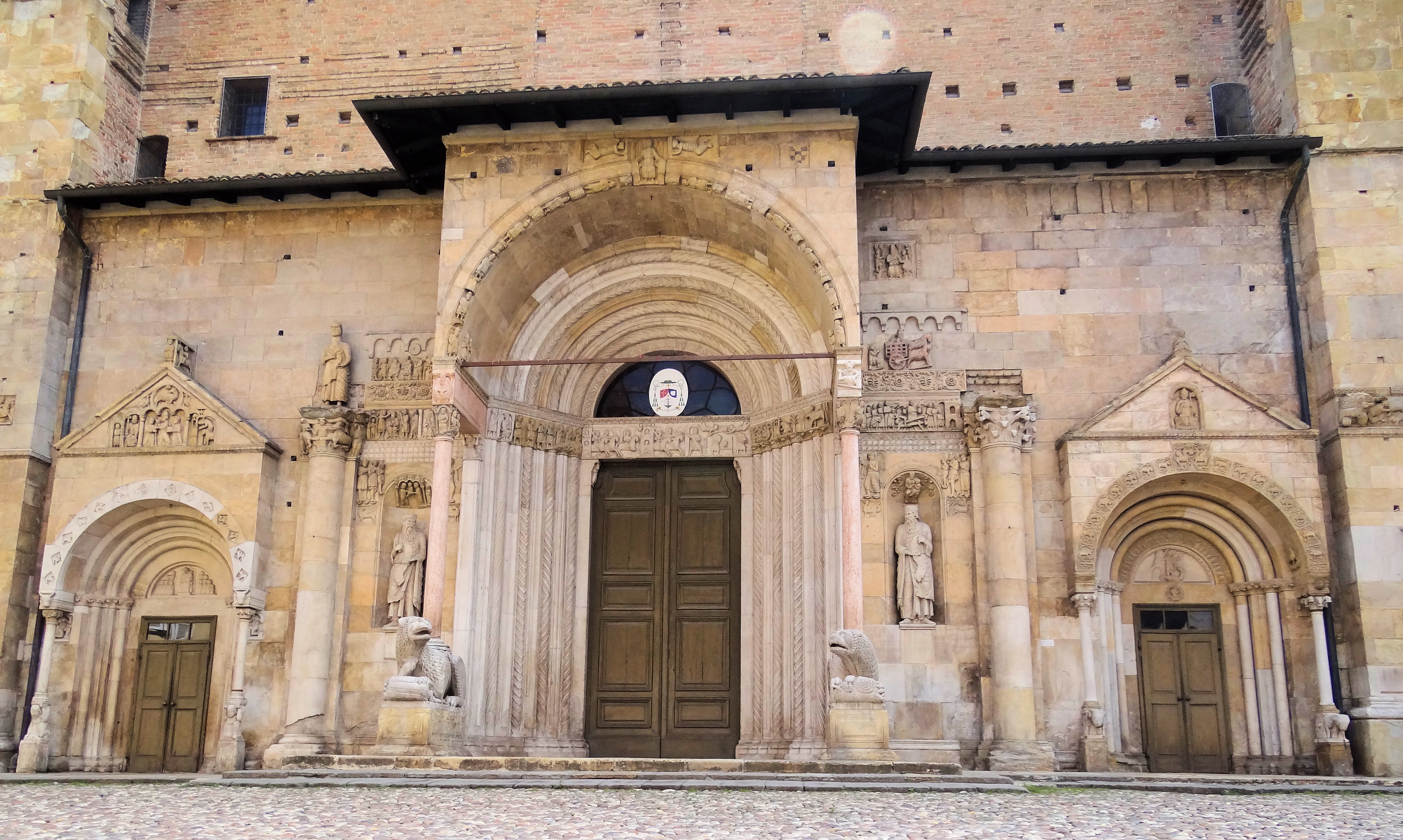
Romanesque portal

Fidenza Cathedral (Italian: Duomo di Fidenza; Cattedrale di San Donnino) is a Roman Catholic cathedral in the center of the town of Fidenza, province of Parma, region of Emilia Romagna, Italy. It is the episcopal seat of the Diocese of Fidenza, known until 1927 as the Diocese of Borgo San Donnino. The lower facade retains its original Romanesque sculptural decoration

== History ==
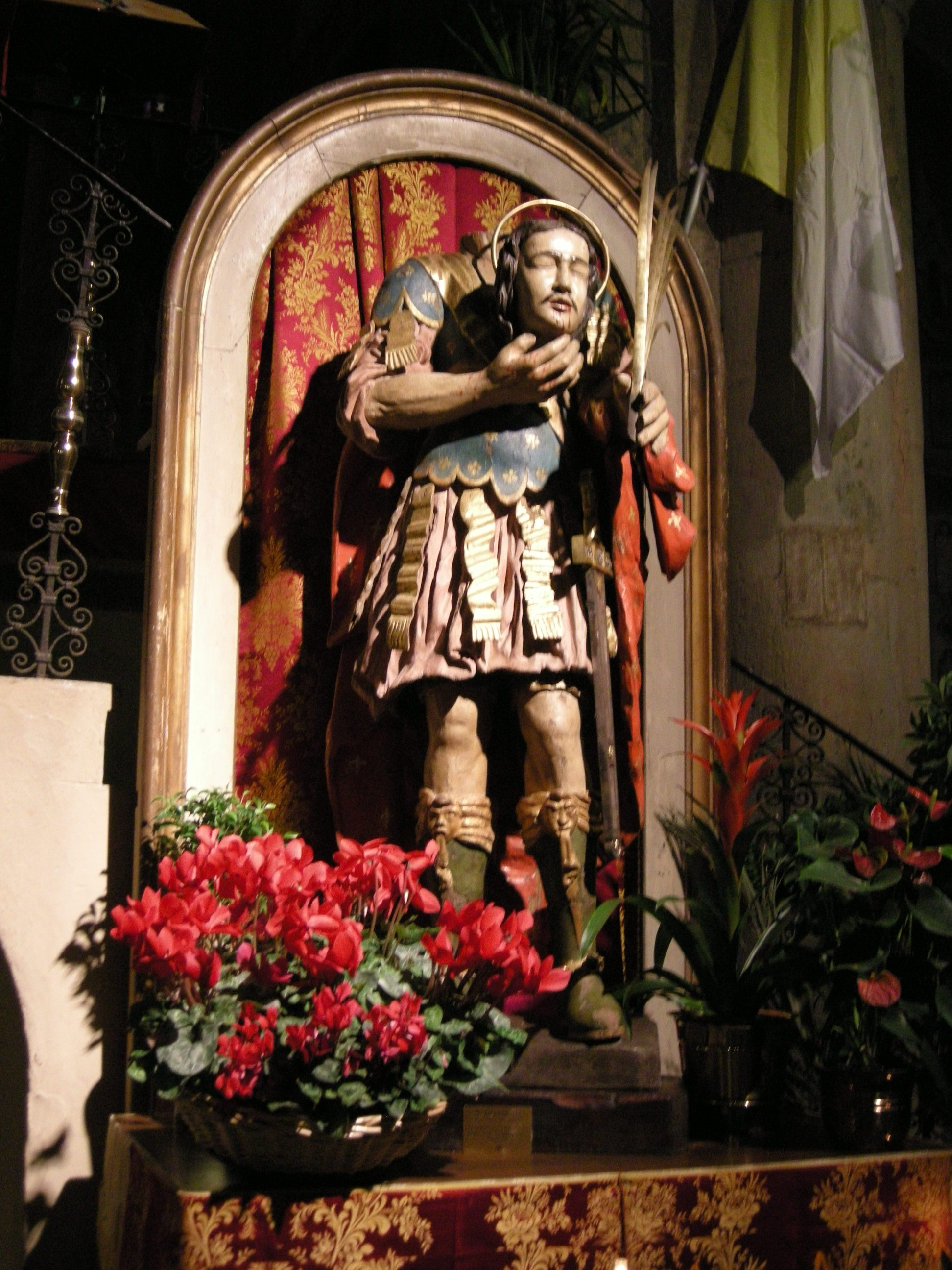
Cathedral interior: wooden statue of Saint Domninus decapitated

Construction of the cathedral began in the 12th century. It was dedicated to Saint Domninus of Fidenza, who was martyred by order of the Emperor Maximian in 304 AD. The saint's relics were brought here in 1207, and are believed to be contained in an urn in the crypt. The town's previous name, Borgo San Donnino, was given in honor of the saint.

The church survived the sack and destruction of the town of Fidenza in 1268. The apse and façade were completed a few decades later. The upper part of the façade is incomplete, but the lower, with its three portals and sculptures, is a fine example of Romanesque architecture, including two statues by Benedetto Antelami and bas-reliefs depicting the Histories of St. Domninus. The interior is simple and well-proportioned, and has not been spoilt by restoration. The statue at the front of the cathedral of the apostle Simon Peter is famous for its pointing in the direction of Rome. Fidenza was in fact a leg within the Via Francigena. Side chapels continued to be added into the 16th century.

Other low reliefs of the Anthelami's school are kept in the apse and in the diocesan museum of Fidenza. The complex figurative programme intersects the Glory of Christ, episodes of the Old and the New Testament, the life of Saint Domninus and other medieval historical traditions, as well as legends and fantastic images. Pictures realized a book of the Christian faith, a book which was conceived with a didactic purpose and destinated to believers and pilgrims of different languages, cultures or completely illiterate. This was not unusual in the Middle Age's Roman Catholic cathedrals.

The altarpiece depicting the Purification of Mary, by Andrea Mainardi (il Chiaveghino) was painted for the church circa 1600. The raised altar may be accessed by a series of smooth marble rungs that introduces to the choir. The episcopal seat is located in the west side of the altar, instead of the southern position which is more usual within the Modernist churches. Located at the extremity of the altar, two staircases which give access to the crypt where the holy relics of the saint are shown.

== Sculptural decoration ==
Fidenza Cathedral, even in its incomplete state, preserves masterly Romanesque elements. The brick façade is flanked by two bell-towers, and has three entrance portals. The central portal has a protruding portico held aloft by thin columns with lion bases. Antelami in this portal sculpted the prophets David and Ezekiel flanking the doorway. In this portal, scenes narrate the life of Saint Domninus and subsequent miracles, who started as chamberlain to the Roman Emperor Maximian. Domninus' conversion led to his martyrdom. Other scenes depict the life of the Virgin, and a statue of Saint Peter. The side portals have carvings depicting Charlemagne and Pope Adrian II. Other carvings depict Hercules and the Nemean lion. Sculpted carvings continue in the inside of the church.

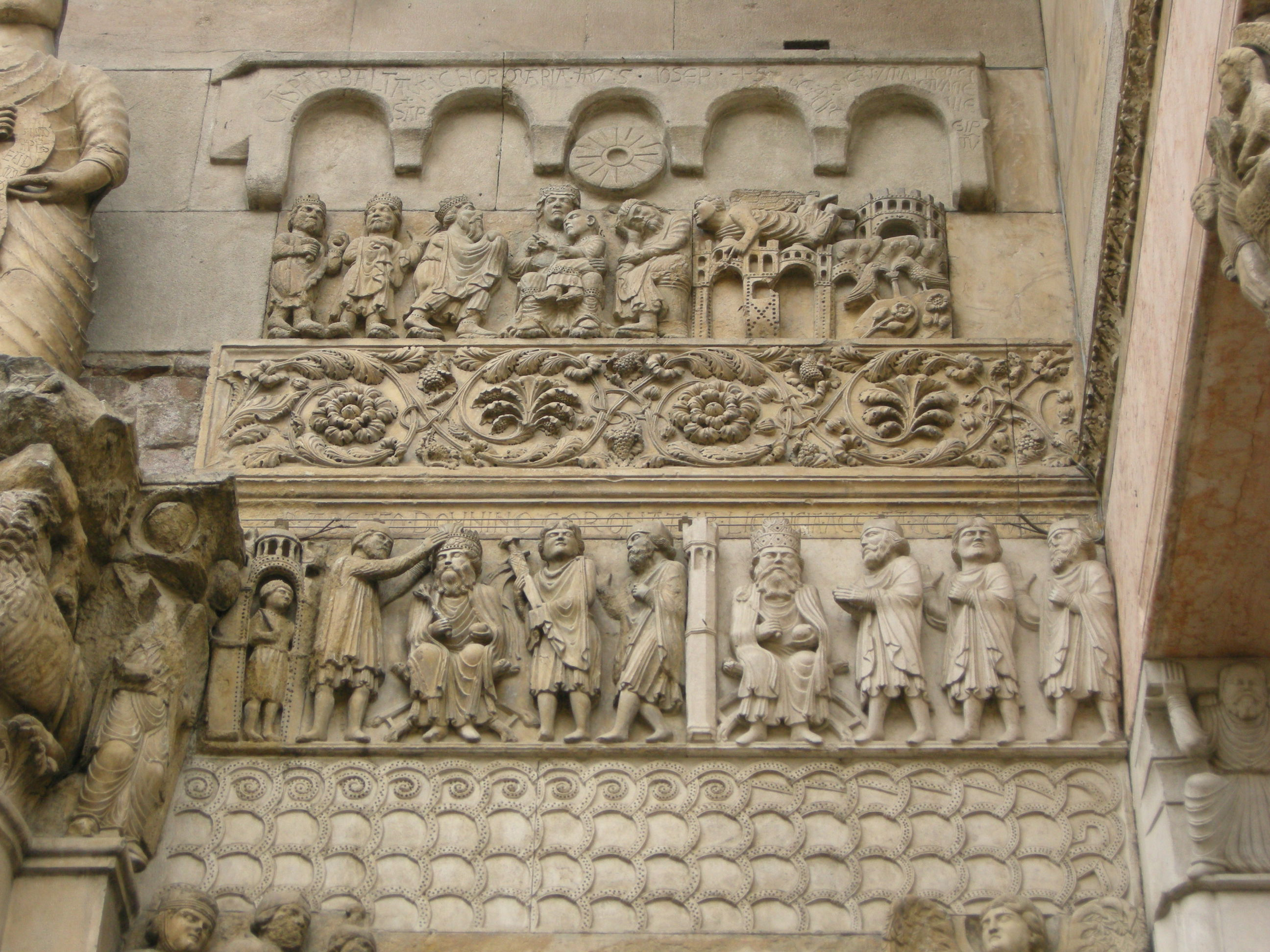
Lower register of bas reliefs on the west front: Domninus as chamberlain crowns Maximian; Maximian told of Domninus' conversion

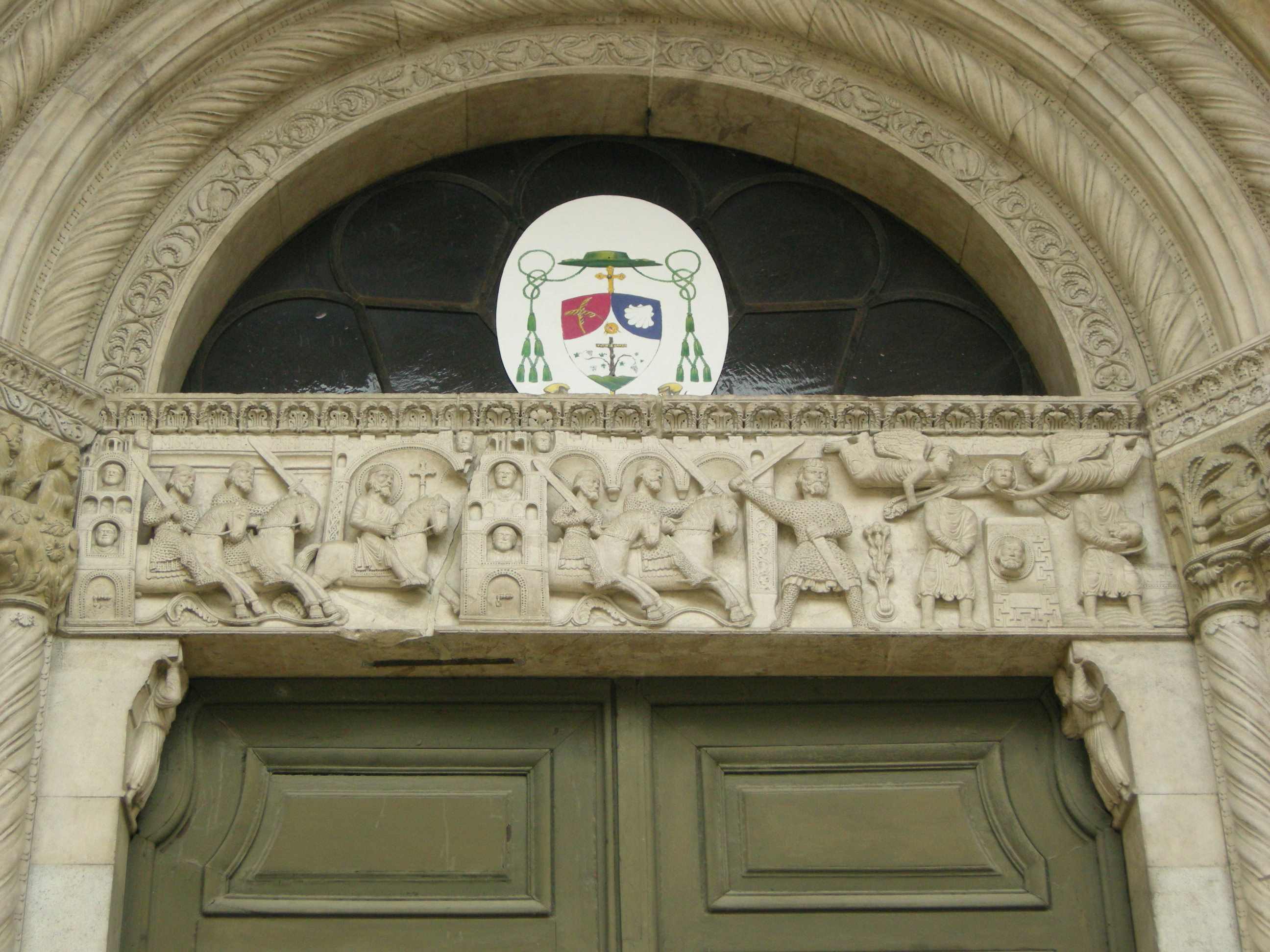
Central portal architrave: on the left, troops muster to execute Domninus; on the right, his decapitation, and angels transporting his head to Fidenza

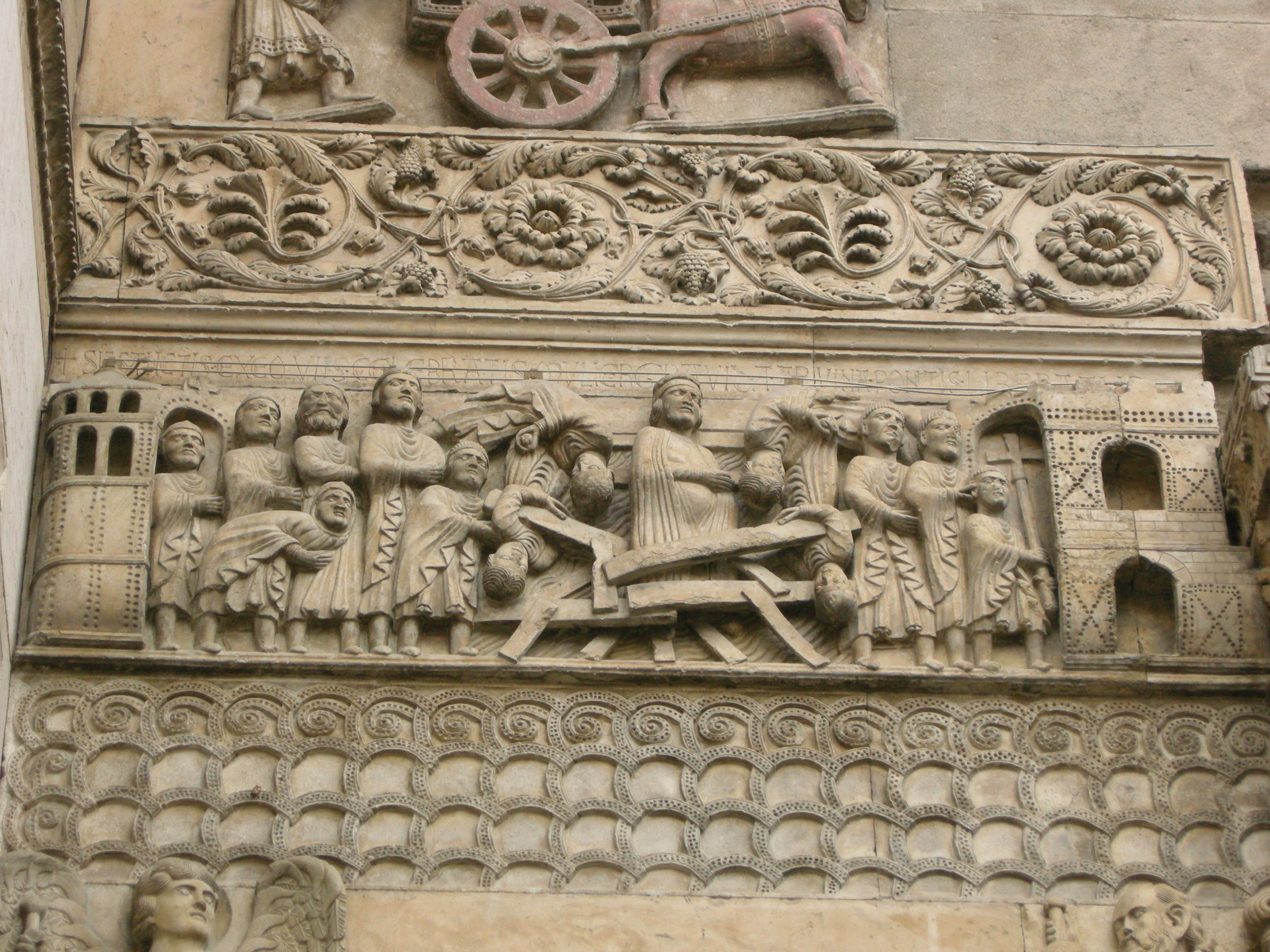
Bas reliefs on the west front: Saint Domninus saves a woman from a collapsed bridge

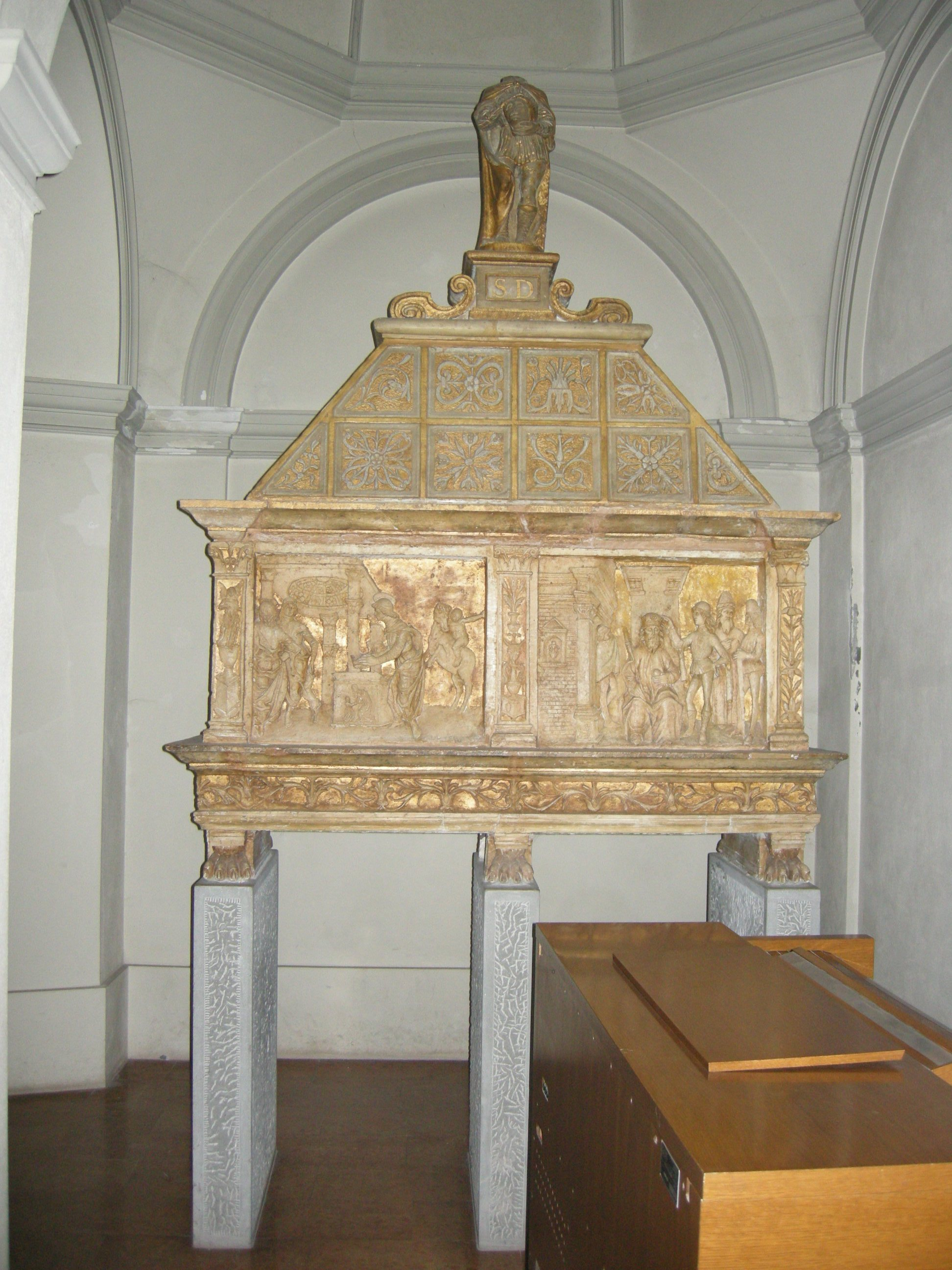
Crypt with the ark containing the relics of San Donnino
