= San Donnino, Pisa =

Coordinates: 43°42′25.03″N 10°23′51.58″E

Church of San Donnino, Pisa
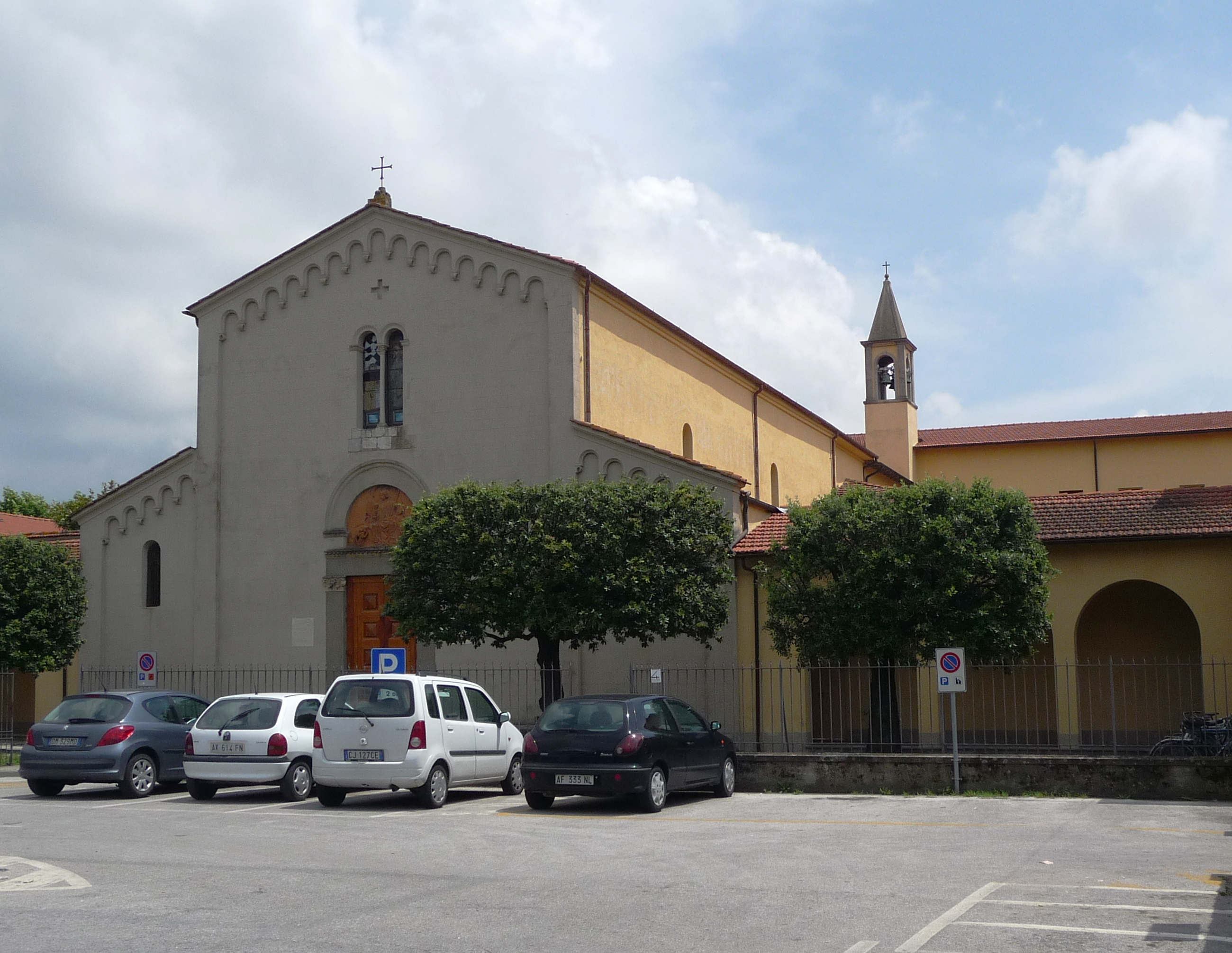
- Facade

Religion
- Affiliation: Roman Catholic
- Province: Pisa

Location
- Location: Pisa, Italy
- Interactive map of Church of San Donnino, Pisa

Architecture
- Type: Church
- Groundbreaking: 1303
- Completed: 1950

San Donnino is a church in Pisa, Italy.

A church was known at the site since 1240, and construction of the present structure began in 1303. It was adjacent to a Benedictine Monastery. In 1575, Cardinal Ferdinando de' Medici conceded the monastery to the Capuchins. Gravely damaged during World War II, it was subsequently restored.

The interior contains frescoes of the Madonna and child and a wooden crucifix, both from the 14th century. It also has canvases by Giovanni Bilivert (1636) and Giovanni Battista Tempesti (1770). Here, before the Allied aerial bombings, was the tomb of the Pisan architect Alessandro Gherardesca.
