= Melchiorre Crivelli =

Roman Catholic prelate

Most Reverend Melchiorre Crivelli, O.P.
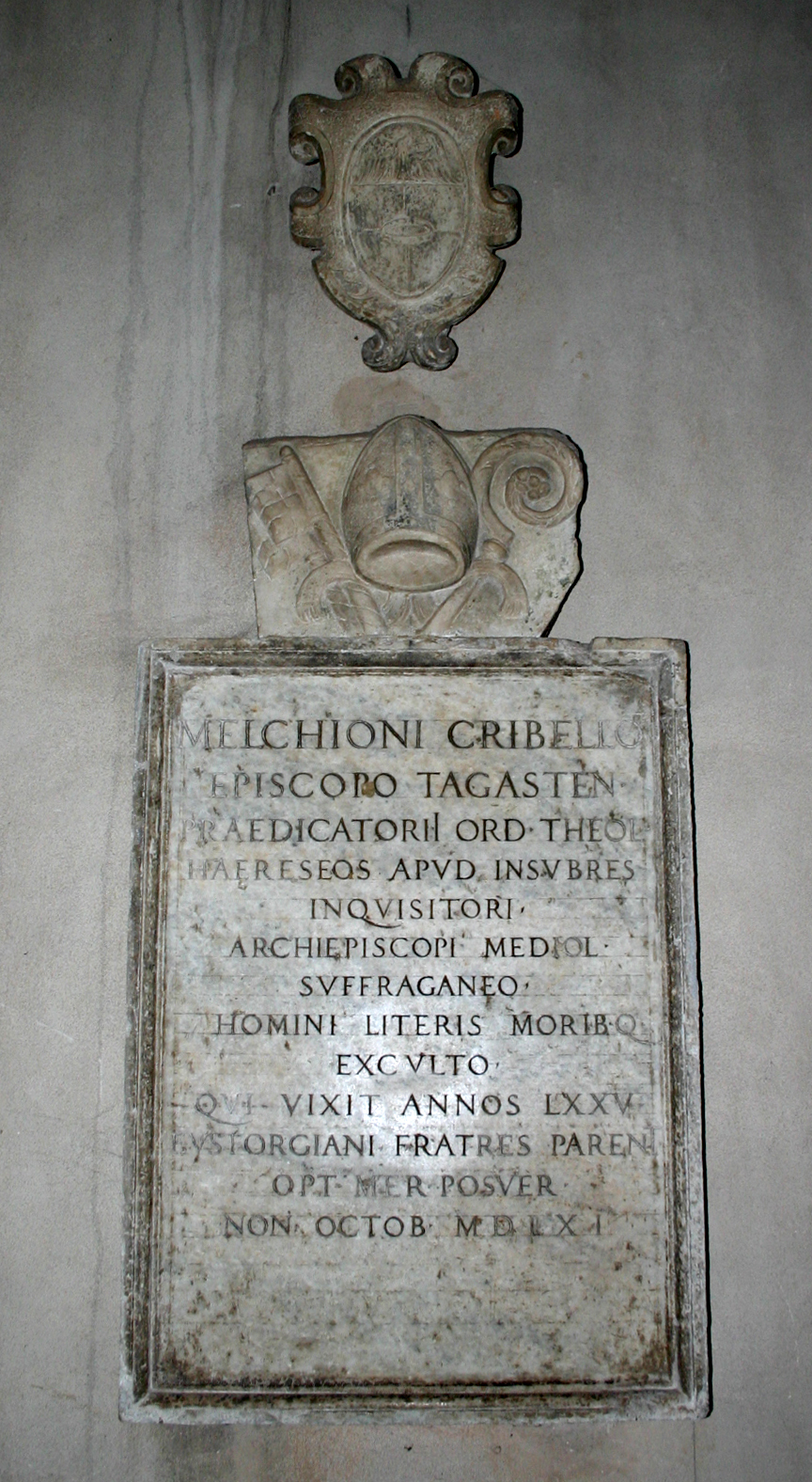
- His gravestone in Sant'Eustorgio
- Church: Catholic Church
- Diocese: Thagaste
- In office: 1540–1561

Personal details
- Born: 1486 Milan, Duchy of Milan
- Died: 7 October 1561 (aged 74–75) Milan, Duchy of Milan

Melchiorre Crivelli (Latin: Melchior Cribellus; 1486–1561) was a Roman Catholic prelate who served as General Inquisitor in the Duchy of Milan from 1518 to 1553, and as auxiliary bishop of Vercelli, Milan and Vigevano. He was an exponent of the early Catholic Reformation.

== Biography ==
He was born in Milan and joined the Dominican Order in the convent of Sant'Eustorgio. He studied theology at the University of Pavia, obtaining a master's degree. On August 24, 1518, Pope Leo X appointed him as General Inquisitor of Milan, even if probably he took the office of Inquisitor only in 1521.

In 1538, he compiled the first Index Librorum Prohibitorum in the territory of Italy, published by the Senate of Milan. This list of books dangerous for the Catholic faith included 46 entries, among them books of Jan Hus, John Wycliffe, Luther, Philip Melanchthon and Johannes Oecolampadius, as well as the Instruction et confession de foy of Calvin.

In 1540, Crivelli was appointed titular bishop of Thagaste, and auxiliary bishop of Vercelli. Since 1544 he started serving as auxiliary bishop in Milan, in a period when the formal bishop of Milano, Ippolito II d'Este, never dwelt in the diocese. The main office of Melchiorre Crivelli as auxiliary bishop was to act as visitor (i.e. inspector), as well as to perform the liturgical ceremonies where a bishop is required, such as ordinations, confirmations and consecration of churches.

Melchiorre Crivelli was an exponent of the early Catholic Reformation, in particular he supported Saint Antonio Maria Zaccaria, the founder of the Barnabites, and the countess Ludovica Torelli and her Angelic Sisters of Saint Paul. In this effort of reformation, he also approved the theological works of Battista da Crema, later condemned by the Inquisition.

He entered in conflict with the archbishop of Milan, Giovanni Angelo Arcimboldi, appointed in 1550 and who wanted take control of the inquisition. Crivelli was not confirmed as suffragean (auxiliary) bishop by the Arcimboldi, and in 1553 he was dismessed as General Inquistor by the Roman Curia. Crivelli moved to Vigevano where he served as auxiliary bishop.

In February 1560, as soon as Charles Borromeo was appointed administrator bishop of Milan, Crivelli was appointed again as auxiliary bishop of Milan. On 19 May 1560 he consecrated bishop Niccolò Sfondrati, the future Pope Gregory XIV. He died in Milan in a day between 19 August and 7 October 1561, and was buried in the church of Sant'Eustorgio, where his headstone is still present.
