= Paola Antonia Negri =

Italian nun

Paola Antonia Negri, later known as Virginia Negri (1508 in Castellanza – 4 April 1555 in Milan) was an Italian nun and co-founder of the Angelic Sisters of St. Paul. She played a dominant role in her community until she was ousted from it by the Roman Inquisition and condemned to seclusion.

== Biography ==
Paola Negri was born in Castellanza to Lazzaro and Elisabetta Doria Negri. Her father was a schoolmaster. She had three siblings: her older sister Porzia became a nun, entering the Milanese convent of the "Dimesse del Crocifisso," of which she became prioress; her brother Camillo was ordained a priest; her younger sister Angela would later join the Angelic nuns.

Virginia did not receive any particular education beyond learning to read and write. This wasn't unusual for that time period. In 1520, for work reasons, her father relocated with the family to Milan. They went to live near the Augustinian nunnery of Santa Marta, where the oratory of Eternal Wisdom was located This was a place of devotional practices frequented by leading figures of Milanese civic life.

The Negri family also did not fail to attend the oratory. The convent and oratory were under French protection, but they finally lost control of the Duchy of Milan to the Empire in 1524. The following year the congregation of Eternal Wisdom was dissolved, and Virginia fell into a period of depression, from which she tried to lift herself by providing assistance to the sick and needy.

In 1528, she met the Dominican Battista da Crema (1460–1534). He was the author of the 1525 work Via de aperta verità. This text instructed devotees to follow a moral discipline and emphasize Christian faith over outward rituals and worldly interests.

Two years later, through Friar Baptist, Virginia got to know Antonio Maria Zaccaria and the Countess of Guastalla Ludovica Torelli: the former would be the founder of the Clerics Regular of St. Paul and would become Virginia's confessor and collaborator, while the latter would finance the construction of colleges intended to house the Barnabites, and the congregation of the Angelic Sisters of Saint Paul. Virginia went to live with her sister Angela in the countess's house near the Basilica of Sant'Ambrogio, where a small community of a dozen young devotees was gathering.

== The Angelicals ==
When, after an initial request made in 1533 to Pope Clement VII, the new Pope Paul III issued the bull approving the new "college of religious virgins" on January 15, 1535, Torelli with Negri and the other sisters settled in the monastery of St. Paul, which had just been completed alongside the church of St. Euphemia.

On February 27, 1536, with five others, Virginia took the veil, taking the name Paula Antonia, in homage to the two saints. On January 25, 1537, she was professed, and on the following March 4 she was chosen as novice mistress. Countess Torelli would also take the veil, although without becoming professed, from the hands of Negri herself.

The Angelic Sisters of Saint Paul did not live a cloistered life: they could be seen on the streets of Milan dressed modestly with a veil over their faces, going to assist in hospitals and hospices.

Close ties were maintained between the two orders of Angelicals and Barnabites, united by common devotional, ascetical and charitable practice, under the spiritual guidance and teaching of Zaccaria and the material support of Torelli. By virtue of this close relationship and the high regard Zechariah always showed her, Paola Antonia became the teacher of St. Paul's clerics themselves. She communicated the essence of Friar Baptist's method of teaching, namely, that the word of God was to be transmitted by degrees, through a necessarily slow process of spiritual enlightenment, and necessarily diversified from subject to subject. She became a strong influence on both congregations.

== The mission in Veneto ==
The strict rules of the two congregations attracted the attention of Cardinal Niccolò Ridolfi, bishop of Vicenza, who specially requested the intervention of a number of Barnabites and angelic nuns so that they could provide for the reform of the local convents of the Convertite and Silvestrine: thus, on July 2, 1537, Negri, Torelli, Zaccaria and two other angelic nuns left for Vicenza.

After the death of Zaccaria in 1539, Negri's status grew even more in the congregations, where she was revered for her apparent prophetic gifts and religious teachings.

Constantly shuttling back and forth between the mother house in Milan and those that gradually sprang up in Lombardy and the Veneto, in an activism interrupted only by the frequent illnesses to which she was subject, Negri continued her work in Verona in 1542. She was called by Bishop Gian Matteo Giberti, who entrusted the Angelicals and Barnabites with the care of the Misericordia hospital and the Pietà orphanage. In 1544 she was in Treviglio, Padua, and Venice, where the two congregations took over the direction of the hospital of Saints John and Paul, then in Ferrara in 1547 and again in Cremona in 1548, gaining increasing attention and adherence everywhere, testifying to the heartfelt demand for a religious message that was truly innovative.

== Decline ==
Shortly before his death in July 1539, Zaccaria wrote an ambiguous letter to Neggro and the sisters, cautioning them not to judge by appearance. In 1551, on mainly political pretexts and not excluding Paola Antonia’s outrageous behavior, the Republic of Venice banished the Barnabites and the Angelics from its territory. In the early months of 1552 the Holy Office conducted an inquiry at the end of which, with an apostolic brief on 29 July, the cardinal inquisitor Juan Álvarez de Toledo was appointed protector of the two congregations; the doctrines of Battista da Crema condemned as heretical, and Negri accused of scandalous behavior and abuses. It also ordered the sending of a Dominican apostolic visitor who arrived in Milan in October. Negri's devotees (including Countess Torelli herself) revoked bequests and donations.

In December 1554, thanks to the protection of her followers, Negri, seriously ill, obtained permission from the Milanese Senate to leave the cloistered monastery in which she had been confined. On 22 March the Milan inquisitor Bonaventura Castiglioni ordered her to return to S. Chiara on the orders of Cardinal de Toledo. Carried on a litter, she was rejected by the Poor Clares because of her illness; she died outside the monastery on April 4, 1555.

== Bibliography (in Italian) ==
- Giovanni Battista Fontana de' Conti, Vita della Angelica Paola Antonia de' Negri, in Lettere Spirituali della devota religiosa Angelica Paola Antonia de' Negri milanese, Romae, in aedibus Populi Romani 1576
- Rita Bacchiddu, « Hanno per capo et maestra una monaca giovane »: l'ascesa e il declino di Paola Antonia Negri, in « Religioni e Società », 51, 2005, p. 59
- AA. VV., Rinascimento al femminile, a cura di O. Niccoli, Bari-Roma, Laterza 2006 ISBN 88-420-5655-3
- Andrea Maria Erba, L'angelica Paola Antonia Negri. Le drammatiche vicende della « divina madre » (1508-1555), Segni, EDIVI 2008 ISBN 978-88-89231-41-8
- Elena Bonora, Virginia Negri, in « Dizionario Biografico degli Italiani », 78, Roma, Istituto dell'Enciclopedia italiana, 2013
