= Francesco Sfondrati =

Italian jurist

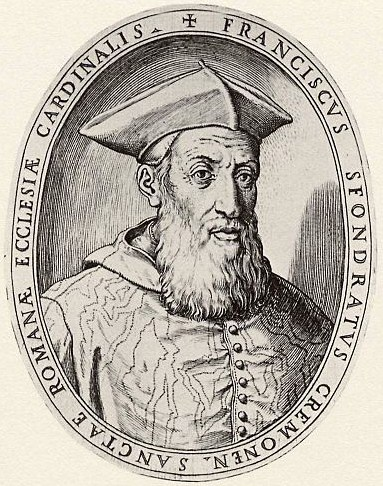
- Born: 26 October 1493; Cremona, Italy
- Died: 31 July 1550 (aged 56); Cremona, Italy
- Burial place: Cremona Cathedral
- Spouse: Anna Visconti (died 1538)
- Children: Niccolò, 6 others
- Parent: Giovanni Battista Sfondrati Margherita Homodeo

Francesco Sfondrati (26 October 1493 – 31 July 1550) was a professor of law at a series of Italian universities, and held important positions as a counselor of Emperor Charles V. He married Anna Visconti, with whom he had a number of children, one of which eventually became Pope Gregory XIV.

After making provision for his children, he accepted Pope Paul III's invitation to enter the service of the Holy See. He held a number of curial appointments. He was made cardinal and in 1549 named bishop of Cremona.

== Biography ==
Francesco Sfondrati was born in Cremona on 26 October 1493, the son of Cremonan Patricians Giovanni Battista Sfondrati (c. 1461 - 1497), Senator of Milan, and wife Margherita Homodeo or Omodeo. After graduating in law from Pavia, Giovanni Battista had entered the service of the Sforzas.

== Imperial counselor ==
Sfondrati studied Ancient Greek and Latin as a young man and then received a doctorate of law from the University of Pavia, where he studied civil law under Giasone del Maino and canon law under Filippo Decio. In 1518, he became a professor of public law at the University of Padua. He would later work as a professor at the University of Pavia, the University of Bologna, the Sapienza University of Rome, and the University of Turin. He was a counselor of Charles III, Duke of Savoy and a member of the senate of Turin. In 1527 and 1528, he was Podestà of Pavia. He was later a counselor of Francesco II Sforza, joining the Senate of Milan in 1530.

Sfondrati married his cousin Anna Visconti, a member of the House of Visconti, daughter of Antonio Visconti, Count of Lonate Pozzolo, and wife Maddalena Trivulzio, in 1537. Together, they had seven children, including Niccolò Sfondrati, who became Pope Gregory XIV. The couple were close friends of Countess Ludovica Torelli of Guastalla (then the tiny County of Guastalla) and her spiritual advisor, Anthony Zaccaria. Francesco's widowed sister Giulia joined the Angelic Sisters of Saint Paul, founded by Zaccaria. Sfondrati became a patron of Gerolamo Cardano after the physician cured one of his sons.

In 1533, Sfondrati acquired the fiefdom of Bellagio, formerly belonging to the Marquis of Stanga. The ruins of the sumptuous Stanga building were rebuilt by Francesco. For more than 200 years the Sfondrati family ruled Bellagio. It was during this period that, favoured by its ideal position for transport and trade, various small industries flourished: amongst others, particularly notable were candle-making and the silk industry (involving the breeding of silk worms and the cultivation of mulberry trees).

Charles V, Holy Roman Emperor then named Sfondrati to the Aulic Council. He was also Charles V's ambassador to the Duke of Savoy. On 23 October 1537 the emperor made him Graf of Riviera di Lecco and Freiherr of Valsassina. He also served as Governor of Siena. He was succeeded in his titles by his son Paolo Sfondrati (? - Turin, 23 April 1587), 2nd Count of Rivera di Lecco and 2nd Baron of Valassina, married to his twice cousin Sigismonda d'Este of the Lords of San Martino, by whom he had issue.

== Clerical career ==
Anna Visconti Sfondrati died on 20 November 1538. In 1543 Sfondrati accepted Pope Paul III's invitation to enter the service of the Holy See and entrusted the education of his four daughters to his sister's community, the Angelic Sisters of Saint Paul in Milan. He entered the clerical state and became a protonotary apostolic and Referendary of the Apostolic Signatura.

On 12 October 1543 he was elected Bishop of Sarno. Pope Paul III then despatched Bishop Sfondrati as nuncio to Ferdinand, King of the Romans and the other princes of the Holy Roman Empire to discuss peace with the Kingdom of France and to promote the forthcoming ecumenical council. Sfondrati was promoted to the metropolitan see of Amalfi on 27 October 1544. He then served as nuncio to the Diet of Speyer (1544) to congratulate the emperor on his peace agreement with Francis I of France.

Pope Paul III made him a cardinal priest in the consistory of 19 December 1544. He received the red hat and the titular church of Santi Nereo e Achilleo on 2 March 1545. He also made him a member of the Roman Inquisition. His statue as expert jurist, Milanese subject of the emperor and prelate in the service of the Holy See led to his being named in 1547 papal legate to the emperor. This legation lasted until June 1548.

On 23 March 1547 he was transferred to the see of Capaccio. He opted for the titular church of Sant'Anastasia on 10 October 1547. On 9 November 1549 he was transferred to the see of Cremona. In the 1549–1550 papal conclave that elected Pope Julius III, Sfondrati was aligned with the imperial faction.

While his son Niccolò embarked on an ecclesiastical career, Paolo succeeded to the titles of Count of Riviera and Baron of Valassina.

Francesco Sfondrati died suddenly in Cremona on 31 July 1550. Antonio Campi mentioned a rumor of poisoning. Sfondrati was buried in Cremona Cathedral.

== Bibliography ==
- Picinelli, Filippo (1670). Ateneo dei letterati milanesi. Milan: Francesco Vigone. pp. 222–3.
- Giannini, Massimo Carlo (2018). "SFONDRATI, Francesco". Dizionario Biografico degli Italiani, Volume 92: Semino–Sisto IV (in Italian). Rome: Istituto dell'Enciclopedia Italiana. ISBN 978-88-12-00032-6.
- Kämpf, Tobias (2015). Archäologie Offenbart Cäciliens Römisches Kultbild Im Blick Einer Epoche. Brill.
