= Isidoro Bianchi =

Italian painter (1581–1662)

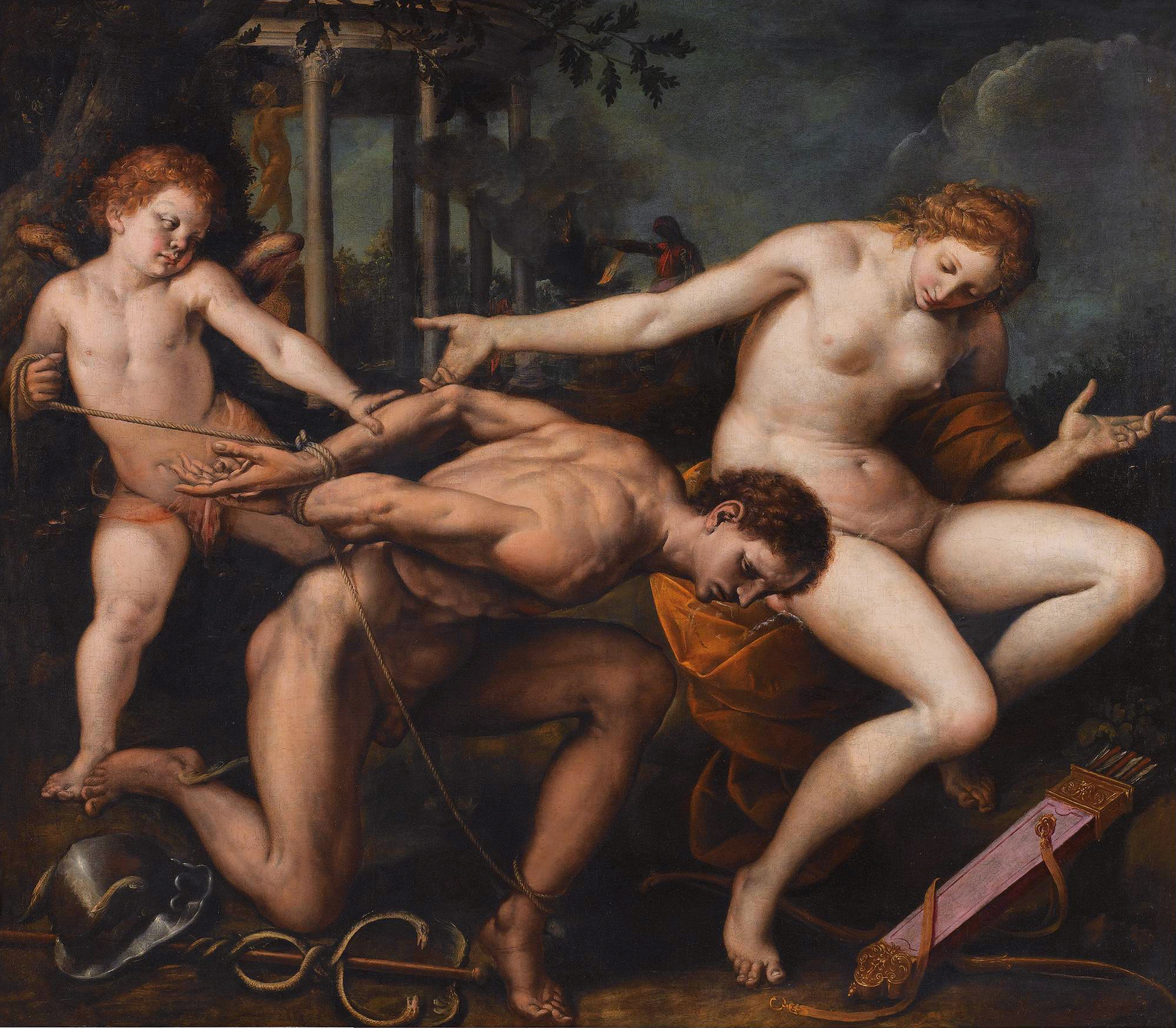
Allegory of Love and Wisdom, oil on canvas painting by Isidoro Bianchi di Campione

Isidoro Bianchi called da Campione (20 July 1581, in Campione d'Italia, Lombardy – 5 December 1662) was an Italian painter of the Baroque period.

== Biography ==
He studied under Pietro Francesco Mazzuchelli. He excelled in fresco painting for the Basilica of Sant'Ambrogio at Milan and in different churches at Como. The Duke of Savoy chose him to finish a grand hall at Rivoli, which had been left unfinished by the death of Mazzuchelli. Bianchi was afterwards made painter to the Court, and was knighted in 1631.

Between 1598 and 1601 he painted for the Cistercian monastery of the abbey of SantaMaria dell'Acquafredda above Lenno. In the following years he worked in Prague, while in 1606 he painted the chapel of the Madonna of Carmine in thechurch of Saint Stephen in Viggiù. In 1617 he completed some stuccoes and frescoes in the Royal Palace of Turin. In 1618 he completed frescoes for the parish church of Santa Maria Assunta in Santa Maria Rezzonico, while the next year he worked as an engineer in Orselina. In 1623 he completed frescoes in the Castle of Rivoli and in the next years worked in the Castle of Valentino, in the church of Monte Capucchino, in the church of St Thomas the Apostle, in the Jesuit church of the Holy Martyrs, all in Turin. He also worked in the sanctuary of the Madonna of Ghirli at Campione.

After 1640 he worked in the Basilica of Sant'Ambrogio, in the Cistercian church of San Remigio, in the church of Sant'Agostino, in the church of the monastery of Santa Marta, in the church of San Gerolamo and in the church of Santa Maria Assunta in Milan.

Other works from him are in the church of Santa Maria Immacolata (Lugano), in the parish church of San Giovanni Battista di Brenzio, in the church of San Martino di Pianello del Lario, in the presbytery of the cathedral of Monza, in the Sacro Monte di Varese, in the parish church of San Giorgio in Castagnola.

=== His other paintings and drawings ===
- Oils on canvas: Viggiù, parish church of St. Stephen, Chapel of Our Lady of Mount Carmel, Nativity of Jesus and the Virgin Birth;
- Chariot of Apollo, and the Chariot of Diana; Oils on canvas: Private Collection
- Allegory of Love and Reason; oil on canvas: Sotheby's catalogue,
- Oil on canvas: Private collection, the Valentino castle realm of Flora;
- David defeats Goliath, oil on canvas: private collection.
- Sleeping Cupid , oil on canvas, Milan, Kölliker Collection.
- Oil on canvas: Private collection, Christ giving the keys to St. Peter;
- Oil on board. Private collection, Battle of Crécy derived from the frescoes of the house near the Prima Madama Reale: Valentino Castle;
- Oil on board: Stresa, Isola Bella, Borromeo Arese Princes collection, Adoration of the Shepherds;
- Oil on slate: Private collection, Immacolata and Angels;
- Oil on slate: London, already at Christie's, Pieta with St. Michael and other Saints;
- Fresco: Cressogno, Sanctuary of Our Lady of Caravina, Lunette of the Chapel of Cordelieri, Stories of St. Antony of Padua;
- Fresco: Como, Church of the Holy Faithful (Como), Chapel of the Crucifix, figures in Paradise.
- Fresco: Castiglione Olona, Church of St. Mary of the Country, Adoration with the saints and shepherds (uncertain attribution);
- Drawing: Frankfurt am Main, City Art Institute, Virgin and St Anthony of Padua;
- Madonna with Child and Saints; Renunciation of the crown by Amadeo VIII of Savoy; Evangelists Matthew and Mark; St Gregory the Great and St Jerome; Two Holy Bishops; Venus and Mars with cherubs (Drawings) Ambrosiana Library, Milan
- Drawing: Dijon, Museum of Fine Art, Jesus with banner (front), St Francis of Assisi (reverse);
- Drawing: London, Victoria and Albert Museum, Virgin with Child and Saints;
- Drawing: London, Christies, Lamentation of Christ with a holy bishop and San Carlo Borromeo;
- The Miracle of the Mule (Drawing) Albertina Academy, Vienna
- Drawing: London, already at Christie's, Pietà with the Saints Abbot Anthony and Carlo Borromeo;
