= Oratory of Eternal Wisdom =

Confraternity in Milan between 1500 and 1530

The Oratory of Eternal Wisdom (Italian: Oratorio dell'Eterna Sapienza) was a confraternity in Milan between 1500 and 1530. It was founded by Giovanni Antonio Bellotti of Ravenna, commendatory abbot of the Augustinian friars of Saint Antoine de Grenoble. Amidst the ongoing Italian Wars, he had been sent to Milan by Joan of France in order to foster spiritual renewal and peace. The confraternity practised the Forty Hours' Devotion.

Prominent members include three future popes, Giovanni de' Medici (Leo X), Giovanni Angelo de' Medici (Pius IV) and Michele Ghislieri (Pius V); the Cardinal Guillaume Briçonnet and his sons, Bishops Guillaume Briçonnet and Denis Briçonnet; and the Bishops Giacomo Simonetta and Francesco Landini. An important spiritual influence on the confraternity was the visionary Arcangela Panigarola, the Augustinian prioress of Santa Marta. Her death in 1525 and that of Bellotti in 1528 sparked a crisis in the oratory. The few remaining members, including Giacomo Antonio Morigia and Bartolomeo Ferrari, were soon joined by new blood from Cremona, including Antonio Maria Zaccaria, Battista da Crema and Ludovica Torelli.

== See also ==
- Oratory of Divine Love
