= Thagaste (diocese) =

Ancient Catholic titular see in North Africa

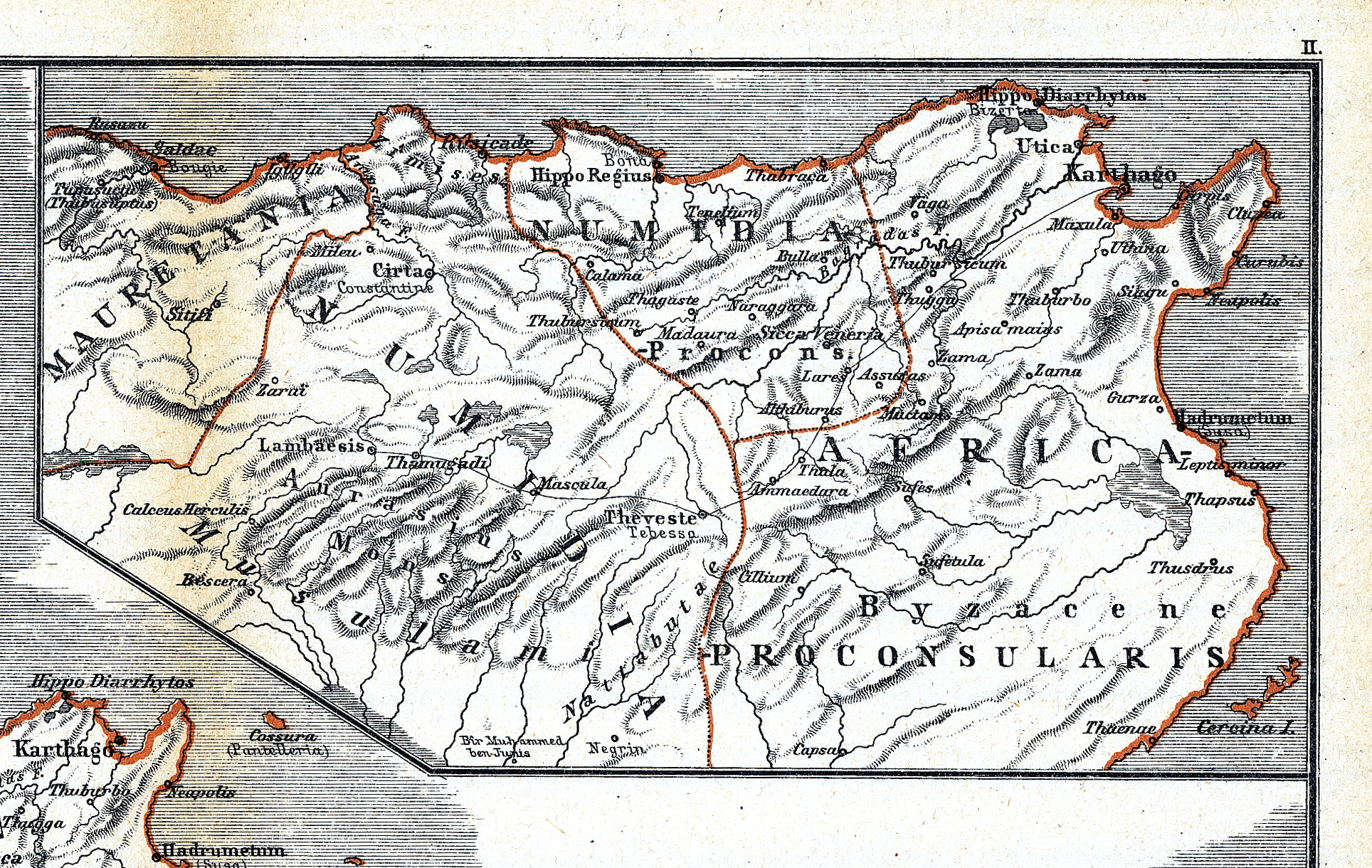
Map of Roman Numidia, according to Mommsen

The Diocese of Thagaste is an ancient Titular See of the Roman Catholic Church.

The ancient Roman town of Tagaste, corresponding to the city of Souk Ahras in Algeria, was the seat of an ancient episcopal diocese during the Roman and Vandal empires in what was the Roman province of Numidia.

Tagaste is famous for being the birthplace of Augustine, who was a bishop in nearby Hippo (now Annaba), and his mother, Monica. Near Tagaste, Saint Melanie the young founded two monasteries in one of the vast possessions of her property in Roman Africa, where she lived a few years before going to Jerusalem where she died in 439.

The first known bishop of Tagaste is Fermo, who suffered martyrdom in the late 3rd century and is remembered by the Vetus Martyrologium Romanum on 31 July: "Tagaste, in Africa, sancti Firmi Episcopi, confessionis gloria conspicui". St. Augustine mentions it in the work The lie.

The next known bishop is Alypius, a disciple and friend of Augustine, also remembered by Vetus Martyrologium Romanum on August 15.In Alipio Augustin dedicates three chapters of the book VI of his Confessions.

The third known bishop of Tagaste is Gennaro, who participated in the synod gathered in Carthage by the Huneric the Vandal in 484, after which he was exiled.

Today, Tagaste survives as a titular bishop's seat; the current archbishop, personal title, holder is Ivo Scapolo, apostolic nuncio to Portugal.

== Known bishops ==
- San Fermo (before Constantine I)
- Alypius of Thagaste (before 403 – after 429)
- Gennaro (mentioned in 484)
- João di Enitra (1452 – ???)
- Francesco of Maiorana (1476 – ???)
- Arnaldo di Bedoreto (1511 – ???)
- Filippo Varagi of San Paolo (1514 – ???)
- Cristóbal Barrionuevo (1515 – 1552)
- Juan de Porto (1517 – ???)
- Bernardo de Andújar (1525 – 1534)
- Melchiorre Crivelli (1540 – 1561)
- Gregorio Silvio (1552 – 1578)
- Andrea Strenguart (1578 – 1615)
- Angelo Rocca (1605 – 1620)
- Giovanni Battista de Asti (1620 – 1620)
- Giovanni Vincenzo Spinola (1620 – 1623)
- Giovanni Dolfin (1656 – 1657)
- Antonio Marinari, (1667 – ???)
- Manuel da Silva Frances (1708 – 1727)
- Alessandro Caputo, (1728 – 1731)
- Blas Antonio Olóriz(1733 – ???)
- Giuseppe Maria Marini, (1754 – ???)
- Jean-Baptiste du Plessis d'Argentré (1774 – 1775)
- Francisco Mateo Aguiriano Gómez (1776 – 1790)
- Francesco Bugliari (1792 – 1806)
- Eugène-Paul Coupat,(1882 – 1890)
- Anatole-Joseph Toulotte (1891 – 1907)
- Luis José María Amigó y Ferrer (1907 – 1913))
- Patrick Joseph Hayes (1914 – 1919)
- Godefroy Frederix (1920 – 1938)
- Costantino Maria Attilio Barneschi (1939 – 1951)
- Antonio Poma (1951 – 1954)
- Gilberto Baroni (1954 – 1963)
- Luigi Bettazzi (1963 – 1966)
- Antonio Mauro (1967 – 2001)
