= Guastallines =

Members of the College of Guastalla

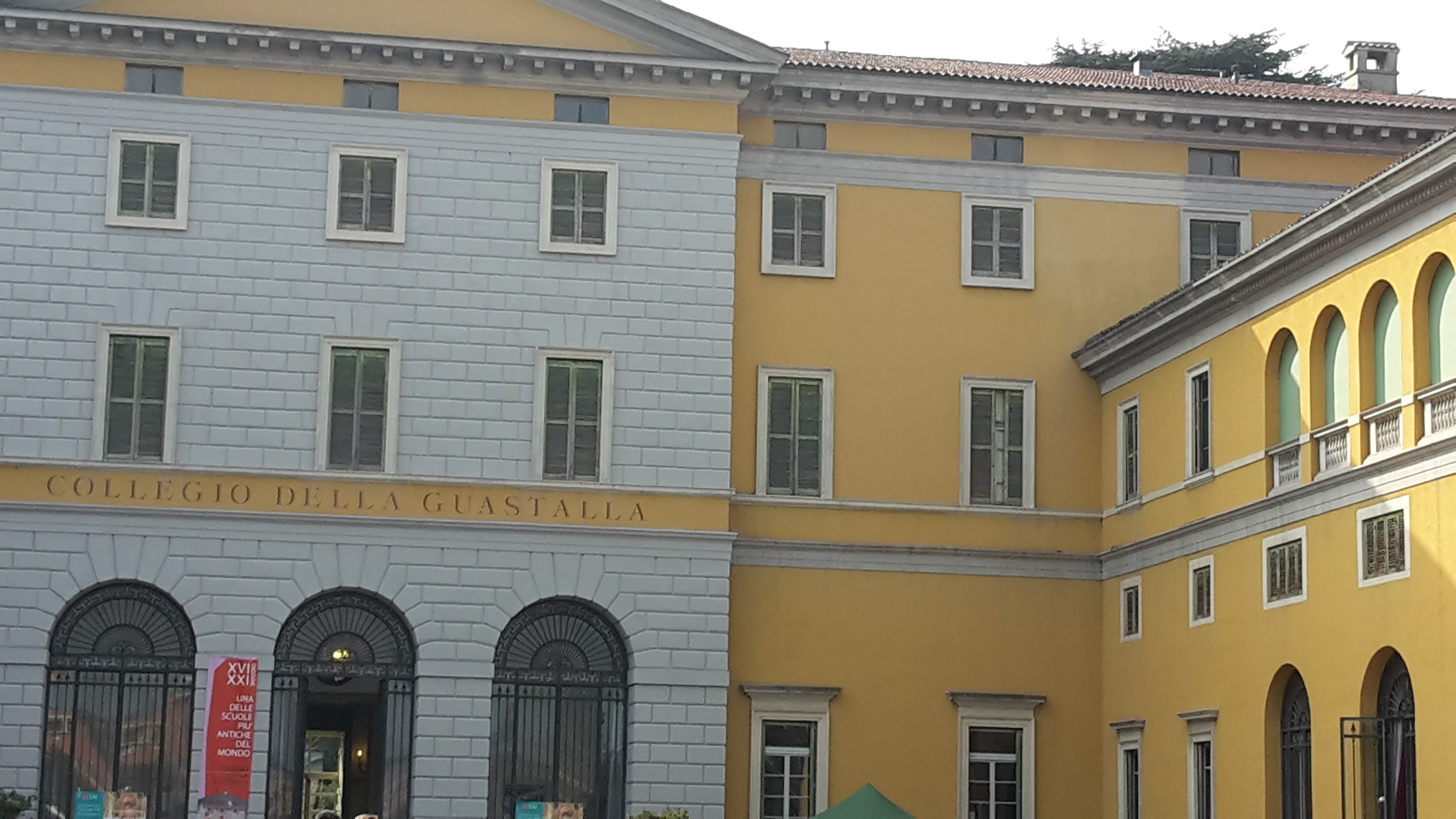
Villa Pallavicini-Barbò, Monza

The Guastallines are members of the College of Guastalla, a Roman Catholic congregation for women, founded in Milan.

== History ==
The widowed Ludovica Torelli, Countess of Guastalla, resolved to devote her life to works of charity. The County of Guastalla, which she had inherited from her father, was laid claim to by another branch of the family, and the affair carried before Pope Clement VIII and Emperor Charles V, whereupon she settled the matter by selling her estates to Ferrante Gonzaga, thereby also increasing her resources for the religious foundations she had in mind.

== Collegio della Guastalla ==
The Collegio della Guastalla is one of the oldest European educational institutions, founded in Milan in 1557 by Paola Ludovica Torelli, Countess of Guastalla.

In 1536, Torelli established the Angelic Sisters of Saint Paul, a congregation of women to assist the Barnabite fathers in the missions. With other Angelicals she accompanied the Barnabites, working among women, and the sick. When Pope Paul IV imposed the rule of cloister on the Angelicals, whom their foundress had destined for works of active charity, particularly the care of the sick and orphans, in 1557 she instituted another community, also at Milan, for whom she built a house between the Roman and the Tosa gate, known as the Collegio della Guastalla. Like the Angelicals, they were under the direction of the Barnabites.

The members, known as Daughters of Mary, dedicated themselves to the care of orphans of noble families, eighteen being provided for in the endowment. The orphans, appointed by prominent Milanese, who eventually became administrators of the institute, could remain for twelve years, after which they were free either to return to the world, or remain as religious, receiving in the former instance a dowry of 2000 lire.

After the death of the foundress, Pope Urban VIII, at the instance of St. Charles Borromeo, enclosed the community. The sisters lived as religious, observing definite hours for prayer, silence, and work, but took no solemn vows.

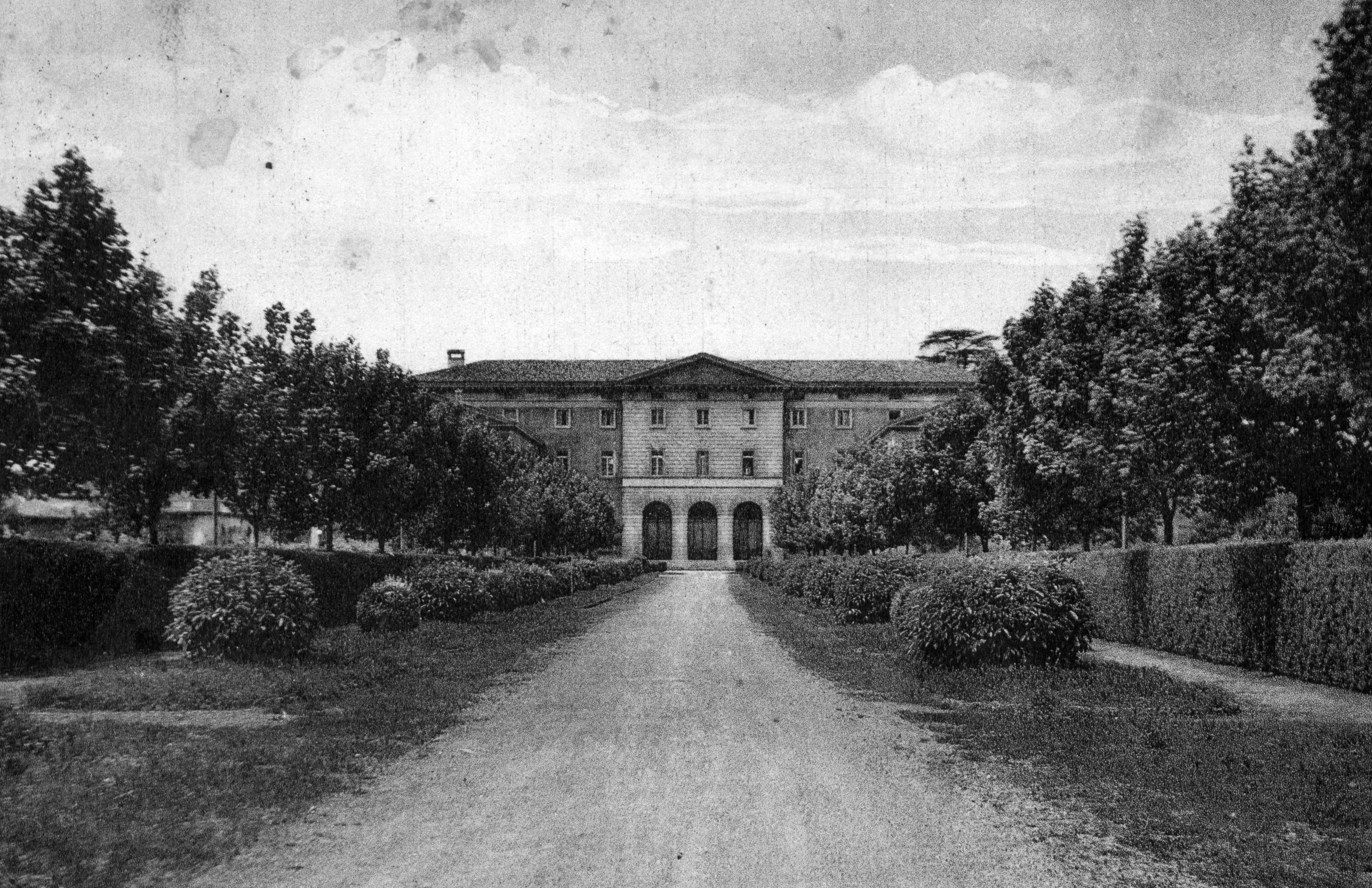
Viale d' ingresso Collegio della Guastalla a San Fruttuoso nel 1956

From 1938 the College moved to San Fruttuoso di Monza, placing its headquarters in Villa Barbò Pallavicini, a prestigious neoclassical building with a large park, a patrician residence built in 1815. Then used as a farmhouse, it underwent extensive renovations. Furnishings, paintings, and historical archives were transferred from Milan. The foundress' remains were brought from the Church of San Fedele to the new chapel.

The institution has adapted over time to changing educational needs. Today, after nearly five centuries, the College of Guastalla welcomes student of all grades, from the two-year nursery program to high school.

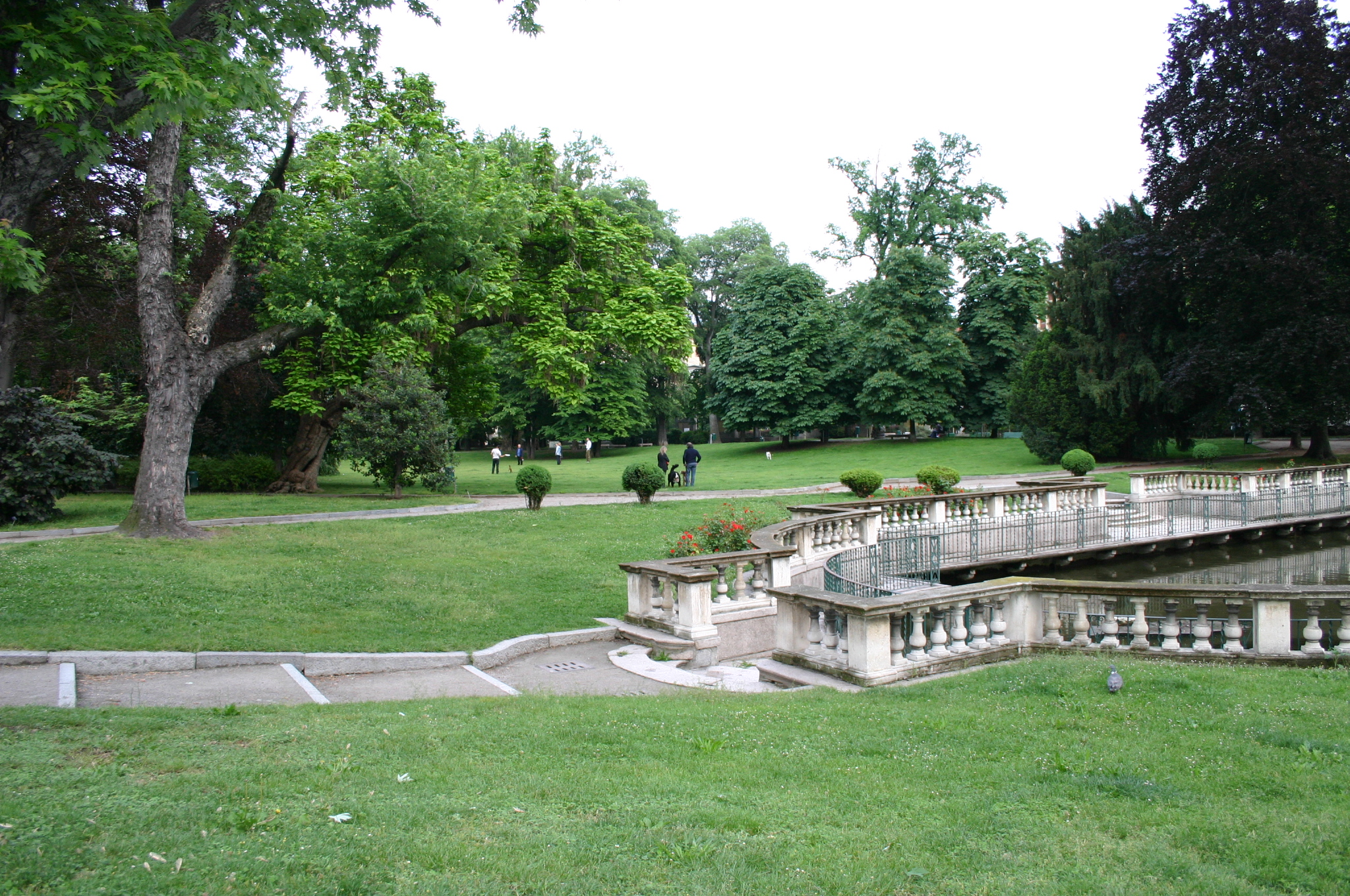
Giardini della Guastalla

The original palace, built near the Naviglio canal, which at the time flowed in Via Francesco Sforza, was equipped with a large park: this is today the "Giardino della Guastalla", the oldest park in Milan.
