= Arcangela =

Arcangela is a given name. Notable people with the given name include:

- Arcangela Panigarola
- Arcangela Paladini
- Arcangela Tarabotti
- Arcangela Felice Assunta Wertmüller
