= Angelo Rocca =

Italian librarian and bishop (1545–1620)

Most Reverend Angelo Rocca
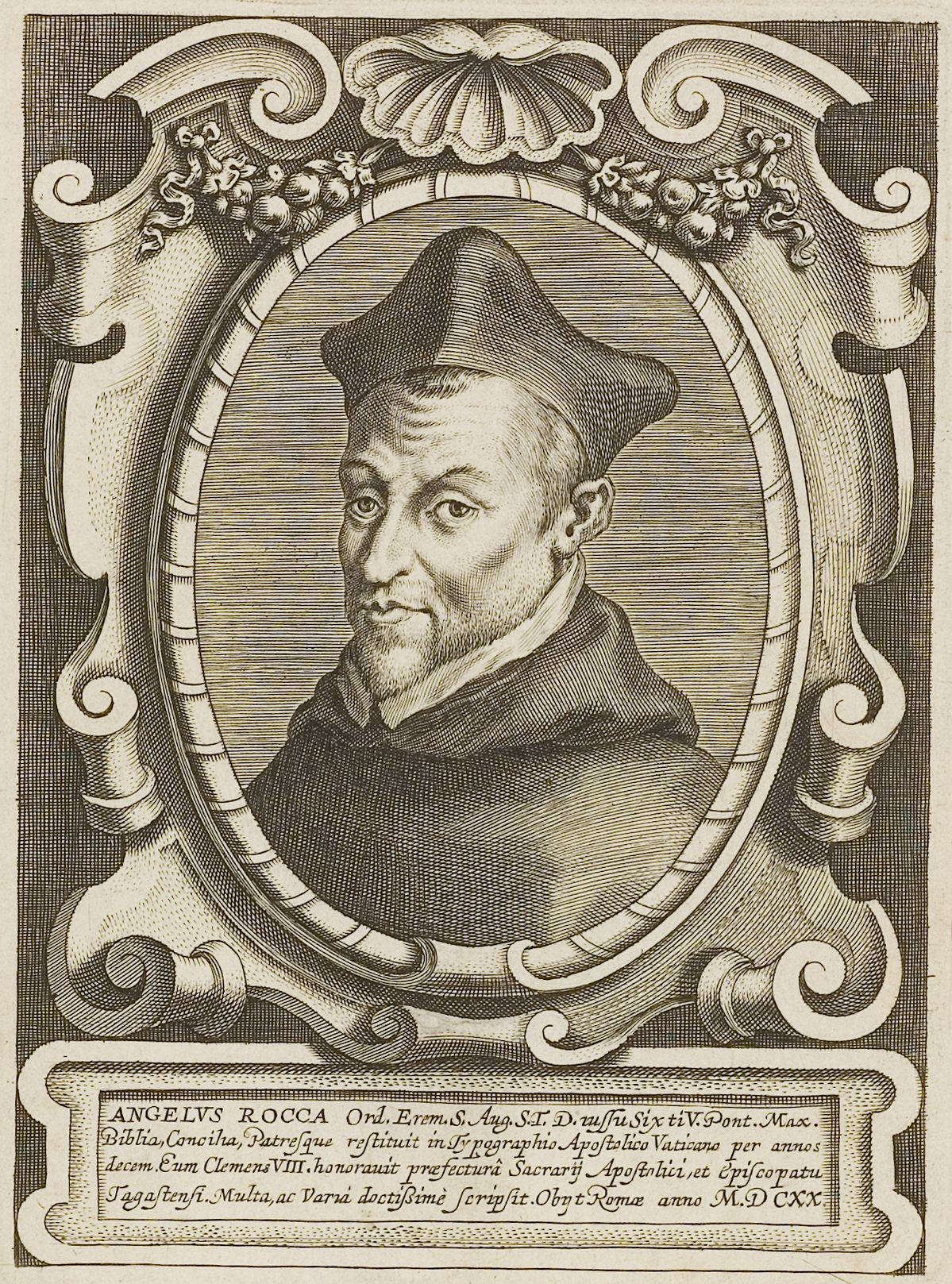
- Engraved portrait of Angelo Rocca by Cornelis Galle the Elder
- Church: Catholic Church
- Diocese: Thagaste
- In office: 1605–1620
- Predecessor: André Streignart
- Successor: Giovanni Battista de Asti

Orders
- Consecration: 6 February 1605 by Ottavio Bandini

Personal details
- Born: March 3, 1545 Rocca Contrada, near Ancona, Papal States
- Died: 8 April 1620 (aged 75) Rome, Papal States
- Buried: Sant'Agostino, Rome
- Occupation: Renaissance humanist; Librarian; Bishop
- Education: University of Padua

Angelo Rocca OSA (3 March 1545, in Rocca Contrada, near Ancona – 8 April 1620, in Rome) was an Italian humanist, librarian and bishop, founder of the Angelica Library at Rome, afterwards accessible from 1604 as a public library.

== Biography ==
=== Early life and education ===
Angelo Rocca was born in 1545 in Rocca Contrada, in what is now Arcevia. He gained admission to the Convent of the Augustinians in Camerino when he was merely seven years old, and completed his education at Perugia, at Rome and at Padua, where in 1577 he graduated in theology. After receiving his doctorate, he taught the humanities in Venice to young Augustinians.

In 1576 he published his first work, a commentary on Lorenzo Valla's De Elegantiis Latinae Linguae. About 1583 he planned to publish an atlas of Italian towns on the model of those produced by Münster, Braun and Hogemberg. He collected seventy-seven maps or panoramic views but realised that they were too different in style and quality to use in a single publication, and the atlas project never came to fruition.

=== Career ===
In 1579, Rocca became secretary to Agostino Molari da Fivizzano, superior-general of the Augustinians at Rome. A keen scholar of codes, because of his background and competence, Rocca was requested by Pope Sixtus V to fill the office of Director of the Vatican Printing Press.

The Vatican Printing Press was managed by Aldus Manutius the Younger, the grandson of the renowned Venetian typographer, Aldus Manutius. Rocca had met the younger Manutius in Venice, and the two men had become close friends. The Augustinian Father had been the keeper and revisor of the texts printed by Manutius, and Manutius had been the publisher of Rocca's first philological work: Osservazioni intorno alla bellezza della lingua latina [Observations regarding the beauty of the Latin language]. Aldo's typographical activity, even if far from the standard of refined elegance of that of his grandfather, enjoyed in those days a very good reputation, to the extent that his editions were highly appreciated and very much sought after. Rocca and Manutius shared a common interest in Christian Neoplatonism which sought to explore a mystical relationship between divine and human phenomena.

Sistus V had entrusted Bishop Rocca also with another assignment: to co-operate in the revisal of the Vulgate Bible that had been decreed by the Council of Trent. As evidence of this commitment, there is still in existence at the "Angelica" a Bible of 1590 with autograph annotations and marginal notes by Sistus V. This is one of the few copies left of the Sistine edition which in 1592, by order of Clement VIII, the new Pope, was withdrawn from circulation and burned. During the editing, Rocca became accustomed to historic manuscripts stored in the Vatican – some of them not readily accessible until modern times.

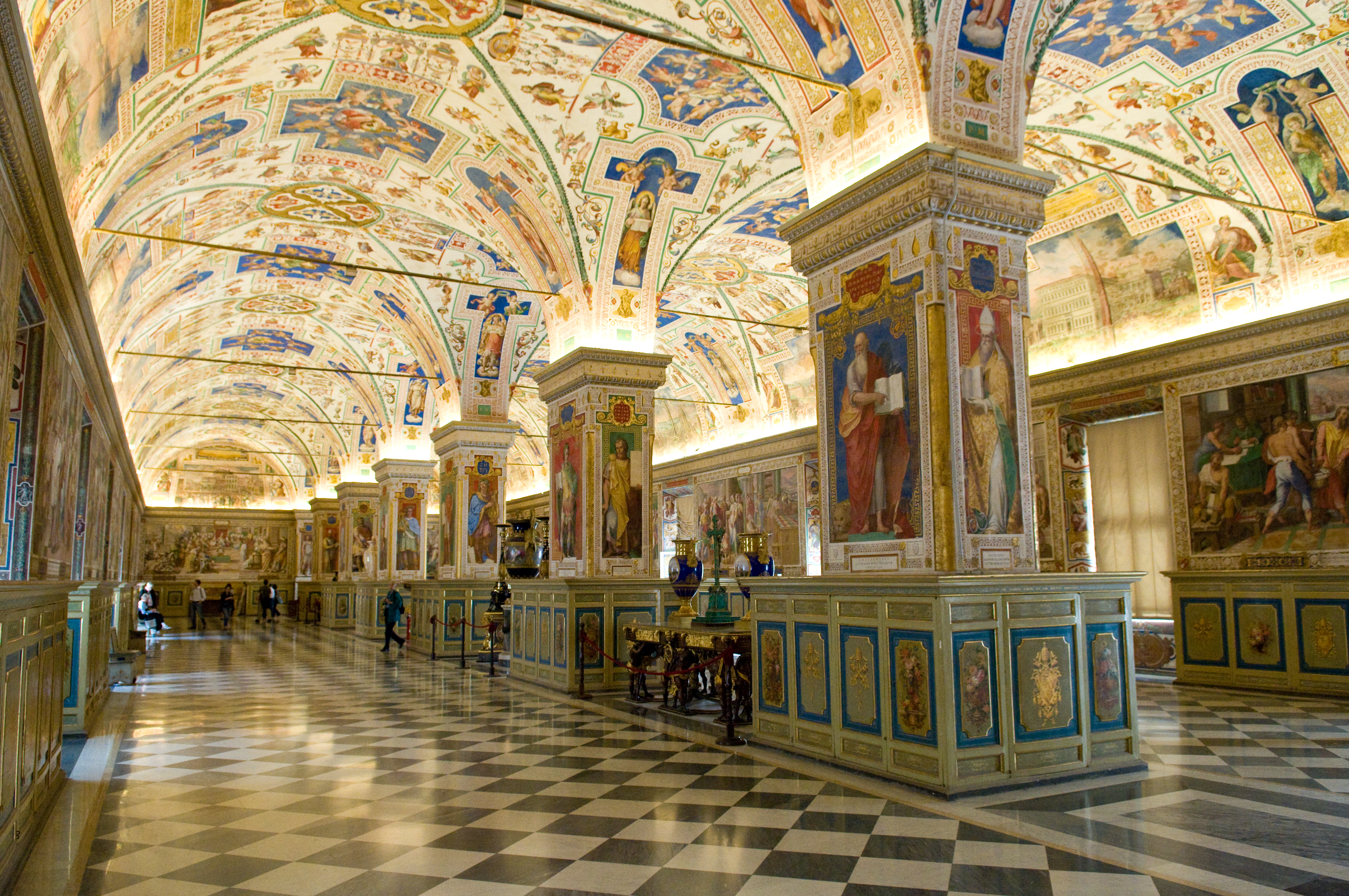
The Sistine Hall of the Vatican Library

Rocca helped plan the cycle of frescoes made by Domenico Fontana in the Sistine Hall of the Vatican Library. In 1591, he wrote the Bibliotheca Apostolica Vaticana, a bibliography of all books found in the Vatican Library, as well as a detailed exposition of the library's history and management.

In 1595 Rocca was appointed sacristan in the papal chapel. In 1605 he was granted the office of titular bishop of Thagaste in Numidia (the historic Augustinian diocese). He died in Rome on 8 April 1620 and was buried in the Basilica of Saint Augustine, the motherhouse of the Augustinian Friars.

=== Works and Library ===
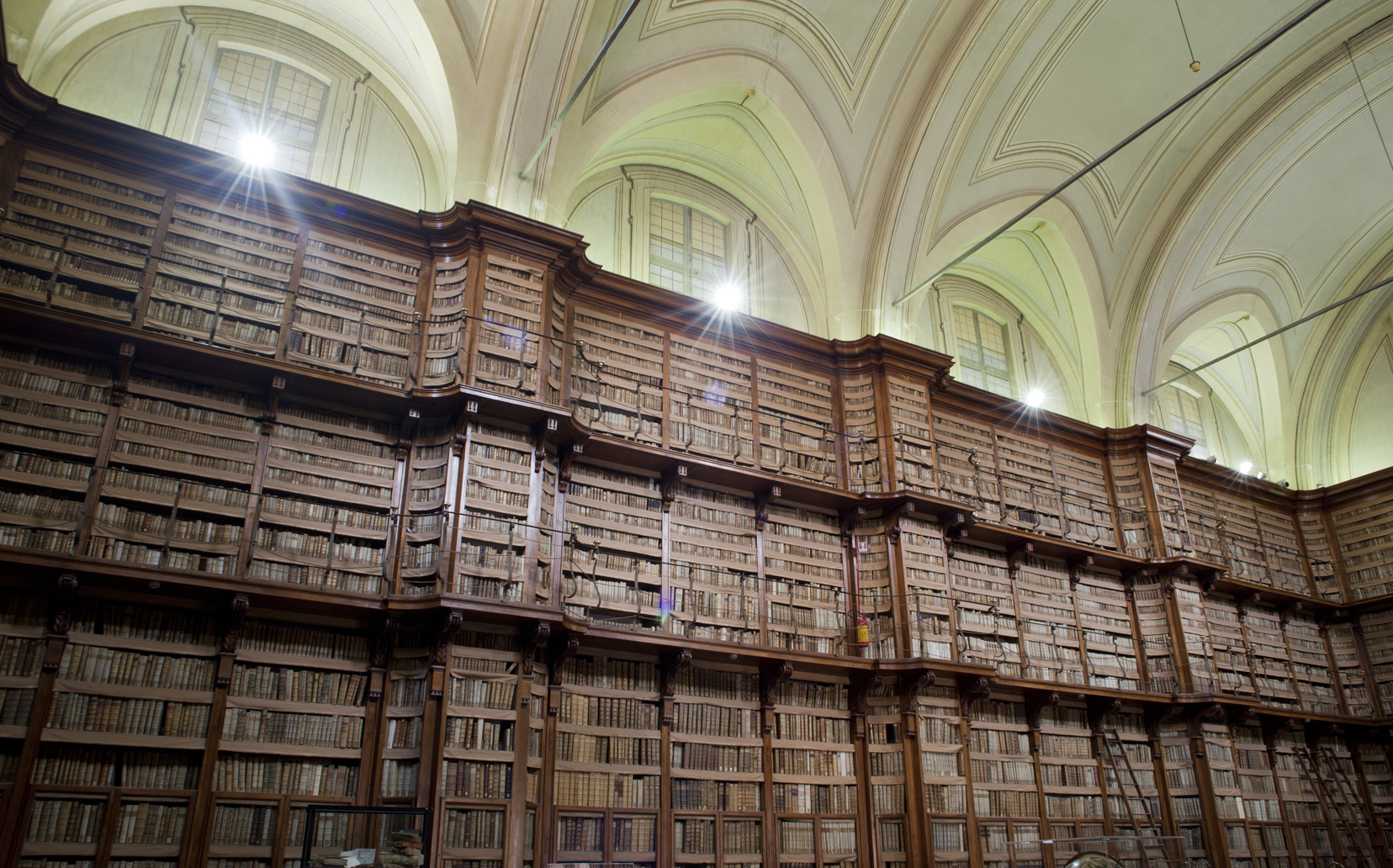
The Ancient Hall of the Biblioteca Angelica, founded by Angelo Rocca in 1604

Rocca, the classical character of a highly cultured man, ranged with his interests across other fields of learning: his production goes from works on theology to works on history, philology and philosophy. Even if, from a scientific standpoint, not always absolutely correct, his works, almost all of them in the Latin language, display his humanistic erudition.

As a counterpart to his activity as a scholar, Rocca appeared to be very keen on books. An alert and painstaking bibliographer, he constantly enlarged his library by the purchase of rare books and works of sundry learning. His library, named in his honour Biblioteca Angelica, became one of the most complete private collections in Rome, possessing over 20,000 volumes. Its holdings were further enriched through donations and purchases; particularly significant were the acquisitions of the personal libraries of Lucas Holstenius (1661) and Cardinal Domenico Silvio Passionei (1765).

In 1595 he received permission from Pope Clement VIII to leave this library to that monastery of his order which he deemed fitting. The permission was renewed by Pope Paul V in 1609. Subsequently, Rocca gave the library to the monastery of Sant'Agostino in Rome on the condition that it be available to the public. Having been open to the public since 1604, the Angelica is considered the oldest public library in Europe along with the Biblioteca Ambrosiana in Milan.

== Works ==
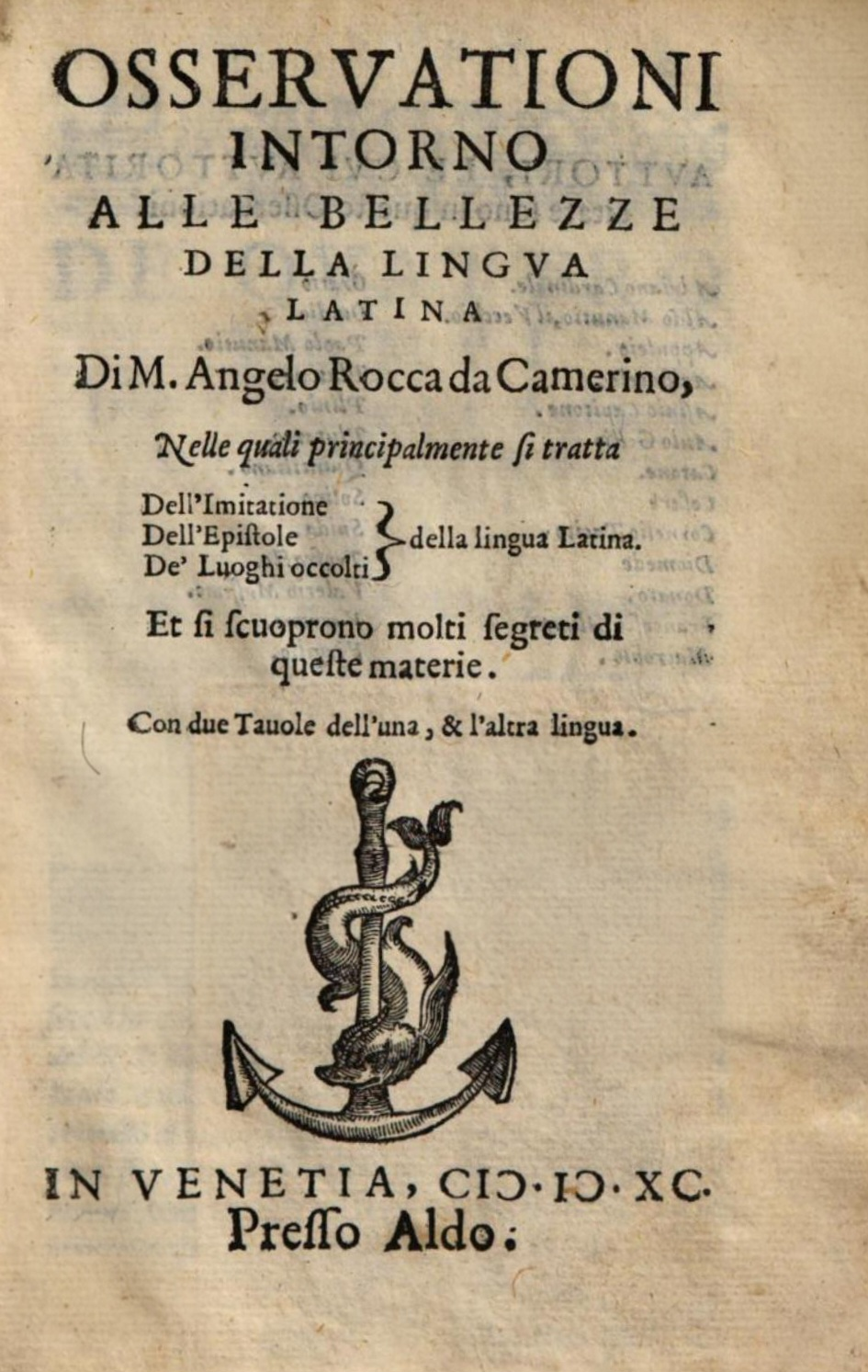
Osservazioni intorno alle bellezze della lingua latina, Venice, Aldo, 1590

Rocca is the author of a great number of studies on Theology, archaeology, liturgy, natural sciences and numismatics. He edited the works of Egidio Colonna (1581) and of Augustinus Triumphus (1582) and took part in the critical edition of the works of Gregory the Great and Bonaventure.

His notable works include:

- Rocca, Angelo (1590). Osservazioni intorno alle bellezze della lingua latina [Observations regarding the beauty of the Latin language]. Venice: Presso Aldo.
- Rocca, Angelo (1591). Bibliotheca Apostolica Vaticana, a Sixto V Pont. Max. in splendidiorem commodioremque locum translata. Rome: ex typogr. apostolica vaticana.
- Rocca, Angelo (1594). Bibliothecæ theologicæ et scripturalis epitome. Rome: ex typographia Dominici Basae.
- Rocca, Angelo (1599). De Sacrosancto Christi corpore romanis pontificibus iter conficientibus præferendo commentarius. Rome: apud Guillelmum Facciottum.
- Rocca, Angelo (1601). De canonizatione sanctorum commentarius. Rome: apud Guillelmum Facciottum.
- Rocca, Angelo (1612). De campanis commentarius. Rome: apud Guillelmum Facciottum.

An incomplete collection of his works was published in Thesaurus pontificiarum sacrarumque antiquitatum necnon rituum, praxium ac cæremoniarum (Rome: 1719 and 1745).

== Bibliography ==
- This article incorporates text from a publication now in the public domain: Herbermann, Charles, ed. (1913). "Angelo Rocca". Catholic Encyclopedia. New York: Robert Appleton Company.
- Morici, Medardo (1900–1901). "Del bibliofilo Angelo Rocca fondatore dell'Angelica". La Bibliofilía. 2 (9/10): 357–362. JSTOR 26205687.
- Castelbarco Albani Della Somaglia, M. (1927). "La Biblioteca Angelica e il suo Fondatore". La Bibliofilía. 28 (10/11): 382–393. JSTOR 26208870.
- Serrai, Alfredo (1991). "Muzio Pansa e Angelo Rocca, storiografi della Biblioteca Vaticana". Il Bibliotecario. 30: 1–67.
- Fiacchi, Cinzia (1996). "Il De dialectis di Angelo Rocca e il Mithridates di Conrad Gessner". Italia ed Europa nella linguistica del Rinascimento. Ferrara: Franco Cosimo Panini. pp. 333–341.
- Roth, F. (2003). "Rocca, Angelo". New Catholic Encyclopedia. Vol. 12: Ref–Sep (2nd ed.). Detroit: Thomson-Gale. p. 275.
- Dotto, Edoardo (2004). Disegni di città. Rappresentazione e modelli nelle immagini raccolte da Angelo Rocca alla fine del Cinquecento. Syracuse: Lombardi Editori. ISBN 88-7260-144-4.
- Serrai, Alfredo (2004). Angelo Rocca fondatore della prima biblioteca pubblica europea. Milan: Sylvestre Bonnard. ISBN 88-86842-95-3.
- Serrai, Alfredo (2006). Breve storia delle biblioteche in Italia. Milan: Sylvestre Bonnard. ISBN 88-89609-24-9.
