= Vincenzo Landinelli =

Roman Catholic prelate

Most Reverend Vincenzo Landinelli
- Bishop Emeritus of Albenga
- Church: Catholic Church
- Diocese: Diocese of Albenga
- In office: 1616–1624
- Predecessor: Domenico de' Marini (patriarch)
- Successor: Pietro Francesco Costa
- Previous post: Apostolic Collector to Portugal (1620–1621)

Orders
- Consecration: 14 August 1616 by Giambattista Leni

Personal details
- Born: Sarzana, Italy
- Died: January 1627 Albenga, Italy

Vincenzo Landinelli (died 1627) was a Roman Catholic prelate who served as Bishop of Albenga (1616–1624) and Apostolic Collector to Portugal (1620–1621).

== Biography ==
Vincenzo Landinelli was born in Sarzana, Italy. On 3 August 1616, he was appointed during the papacy of Pope Paul V as Bishop of Albenga. On 14 August 1616, he was consecrated bishop by Giambattista Leni, Bishop of Ferrara, with Galeazzo Sanvitale, Archbishop Emeritus of Bari-Canosa, and Ulpiano Volpi, Archbishop Emeritus of Chieti, serving as co-consecrators. On 4 June 1620, he was appointed during the papacy of Pope Paul V as Apostolic Collector to Portugal; he resigned on 15 September 1621. He served as Bishop of Albenga until his resignation in 1624. He died on January 1627.

== Episcopal succession ==
Episcopal succession of Vincenzo Landinelli

While bishop, he was the principal consecrator of:

- Ambrogio Machin, Bishop of Alghero (1622);

and the principal co-consecrator of:

- Girolamo Ricciulli, Bishop of Belcastro (1616);
- Lelio Veterano, Bishop of Fondi (1616);
- Altobello Carissimi, Bishop of Minervino Murge (1617);
- Giovanni Battista de Asti, Titular Bishop of Thagaste (1620);
- Fausto Caffarelli, Archbishop of Santa Severina (1624);
- Giovanni Battista Altieri (seniore), Bishop of Camerino (1624);
- Ottavio Broglia, Bishop of Asti (1624);
- Alderano Bellati (Bellatto), Bishop of Bisignano (1624);
- Francesco Maria Spinola, Bishop of Savona (1624);
- Pietro Francesco Costa, Bishop of Albenga (1624); and
- Ulysses Gherardini della Rosa, Bishop of Sessa Aurunca (1624).

== External links and additional sources ==
- Cheney, David M. "Diocese of Albenga-Imperia". Catholic-Hierarchy.org. (for Chronology of Bishops) ^{[self-published]}
- Chow, Gabriel. "Diocese of Albenga-Imperia (Italy)". GCatholic.org. (for Chronology of Bishops) ^{[self-published]}
- Cheney, David M. "Nunciature to Portugal". Catholic-Hierarchy.org. (for Chronology of Bishops) ^{[self-published]}

Catholic Church titles
Preceded by Ottavio Accoramboni	Apostolic Collector to Portugal; 1620–1621	Succeeded by Antonio Albergati
Preceded by Domenico de' Marini (patriarch)	Bishop of Albenga; 1616–1624	Succeeded by Pietro Francesco Costa
