= Cardinals created by Gregory XIV =

Catholic appointments from 1590 to 1591

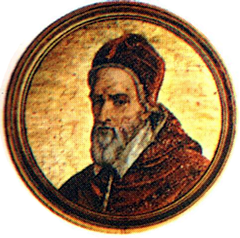
Pope Gregory XIV (1535-91).

Pope Gregory XIV (r. 1590–1591) created five new cardinals in two consistories:

== 19 December 1590 ==
1. Paolo Emilio Sfondrati, nephew of the Pope – cardinal-priest of S. Cecilia (received the title on 14 January 1591), then cardinal-bishop of Albano (17 August 1611), †14 February 1618.

== 6 March 1591 ==
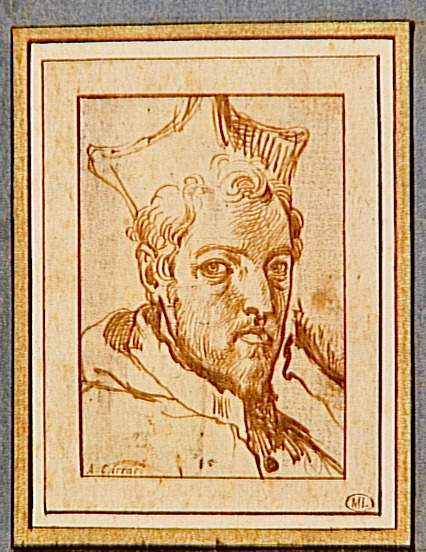
Odoardo Farnese (1573-1623), made a cardinal on March 6, 1591.

1. Ottavio Paravicini, bishop of Alessandria, nuncio in Switzerland – cardinal-priest of S. Giovanni a Porta Latina (received the title on 20 November 1591), then cardinal-priest of S. Alessio (9 March 1592), † 3 February 1611.
2. Ottavio Acquaviva d'Aragona, referendary of the Apostolic Signature – cardinal-deacon of S. Giorgio in Velabro (received the title on 5 April 1591), then cardinal-priest of S. Maria del Popolo (15 March 1593), cardinal-priest of SS. Giovanni e Paolo (22 April 1602), cardinal-priest of S. Prassede (5 June 1605), † 5 December 1612.
3. Odoardo Farnese, brother of the Duke of Parma – cardinal-deacon of S. Adriano (received the title on 20 November 1591), then cardinal-deacon of S. Eustachio (12 June 1605), cardinal-deacon of S. Maria in Via Lata (13 November 1617), cardinal-priest without the title (11 January 1621), cardinal-bishop of Sabina (3 March 1621), cardinal-bishop of Frascati (27 September 1623), †21 February 1626.
4. Flaminio Piatti, auditor of the Sacred Roman Rota – cardinal-deacon of S. Maria in Domnica (received the title on 5 April 1591), then cardinal-deacon of SS. Cosma e Damiano (9 March 1592), cardinal-priest of S. Clemente (15 March 1593), cardinal-priest of S. Onofrio (10 June 1596), cardinal-priest of S. Maria della Pace (24 April 1600), † 1 November 1613
