= Pope Gregory XIV =

Head of the Catholic Church from 1590 to 1591

- Bishop of Rome
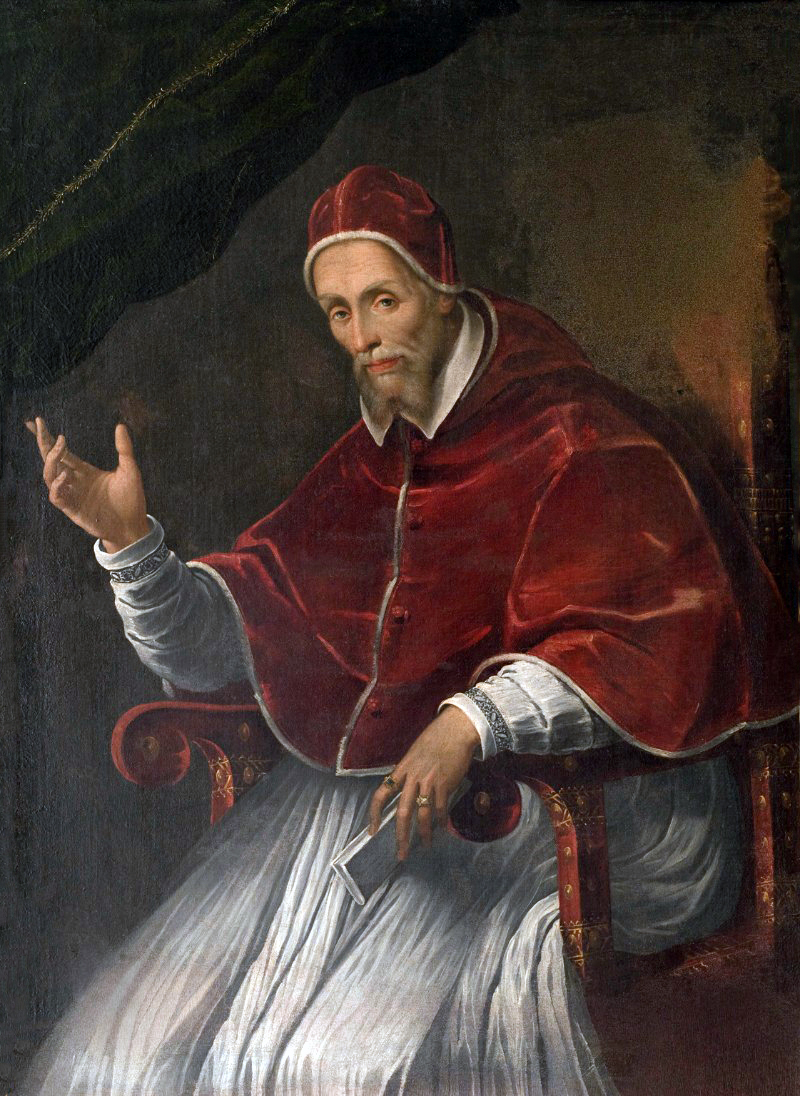
- Portrait identified as Gregory XIV (formerly identified as Urban VII), c. 1591
- Church: Catholic Church
- Papacy began: 5 December 1590
- Papacy ended: 16 October 1591
- Predecessor: Urban VII
- Successor: Innocent IX
- Previous posts: Abbot of Civate (1551–1560); Bishop of Cremona (1560–1590); Cardinal-Priest of Santa Cecilia in Trastevere (1585–1590)

Orders
- Consecration: 19 May 1560 (Bishop) by Melchiorre Crivelli, O.P.
- Created cardinal: 12 December 1583 by Gregory XIII

Personal details
- Born: Niccolò Sfondrato or Sfondrati; 11 February 1535 Somma Lombardo, Duchy of Milan
- Died: 16 October 1591 (aged 56) Rome, Papal States
- Buried: St. Peter's Basilica

- Coat of arms

Papal styles of Pope Gregory XIV
- Reference style: His Holiness
- Spoken style: Your Holiness
- Religious style: Holy Father
- Posthumous style: None

Pope Gregory XIV (Latin: Gregorius XIV; Italian: Gregorio XIV; 11 February 1535 – 16 October 1591), born Niccolò Sfondrato or Sfondrati, was head of the Catholic Church and ruler of the Papal States from 5 December 1590 to his death, in October 1591.

== Early career ==
Niccolò Sfondrati was born on 11 February 1535 at Somma Lombardo, then part of the Duchy of Milan, in the highest stratum of Milanese society. His mother, Anna of the House of Visconti, died in childbirth. His father Francesco Sfondrati, a senator of the ancient comune of Milan, after the death of his wife in 1538 entered in the ecclesiastic state and was created cardinal-priest by Pope Paul III in 1544. As soon as appointed bishop of Cremona, Niccolò's father died in 1550.

Niccolò in his youth was known for his modest lifestyle and stringent piety. He studied law at Perugia and he graduated in utroque iure at the University of Padua on 2 March 1555. He replaced his father as Commendatory abbot of the Abbey of Civate: differently from the uses of most commendatory abbots at that time, Niccolò with religious fervour took care of the buildings and reformed the religious life of the abbey. In June 1552 he was appointed by Philip II of Spain a senator in Milan, and the Spanish government urged the Pope to appoint him Bishop of Cremona in 1557. That appointment occurred on 13 March 1560 with the election of Pope Pius IV, a Lombard as were the Sfondrati. Niccolò Sfondrati was consecrated bishop in Milan on next 19 May by the auxiliary bishop of Milan Melchiorre Crivelli who acted in the name of Cardinal Charles Borromeo.

He participated in the sessions of the Council of Trent from 1561 to 1563 where he took a position in favour of the divine origin of the residence of bishops in their diocese, a position not well seen by Rome. Returned in his diocese, he applied the reforms of the Council of Trent under the supervision of his Metropolitan Archbishop, Cardinal Charles Borromeo, to whom he was related. Pope Gregory XIII made him a Cardinal-Priest of Santa Cecilia in Trastevere on 12 December 1583. When the Cardinal Borromeo died, Niccolò Sfondrati celebrated the Requiem Mass for Borromeo on 7 November 1584. Sfondrati was an intimate friend and a great admirer of Philip Neri, an Italian priest who died in 1595 and was canonised in 1622.

=== Papal election ===
After the death of Pope Urban VII on 27 September 1590, the Spanish ambassador Olivares presented the conclave a list of the seven cardinals who would be acceptable to his master Philip II of Spain. On 5 December 1590, after two months of deadlock, Sfondrati, who was on Philip II's list but had not aspired to the office, was elected pope. Cardinal Alessandro Peretti di Montalto came to Sfondrati's cell to inform him that the Sacred College had agreed on his election and found him kneeling in prayer before a crucifix.

On the day after he was elected Pope, Gregory XIV burst into tears and said to the cardinals: "God forgive you! What have you done?" In his bull of 21 March 1591, Cogit nos, he forbade under pain of excommunication all betting concerning the election of a Pope, the duration of a pontificate, or the creation of new cardinals.

== Papacy ==
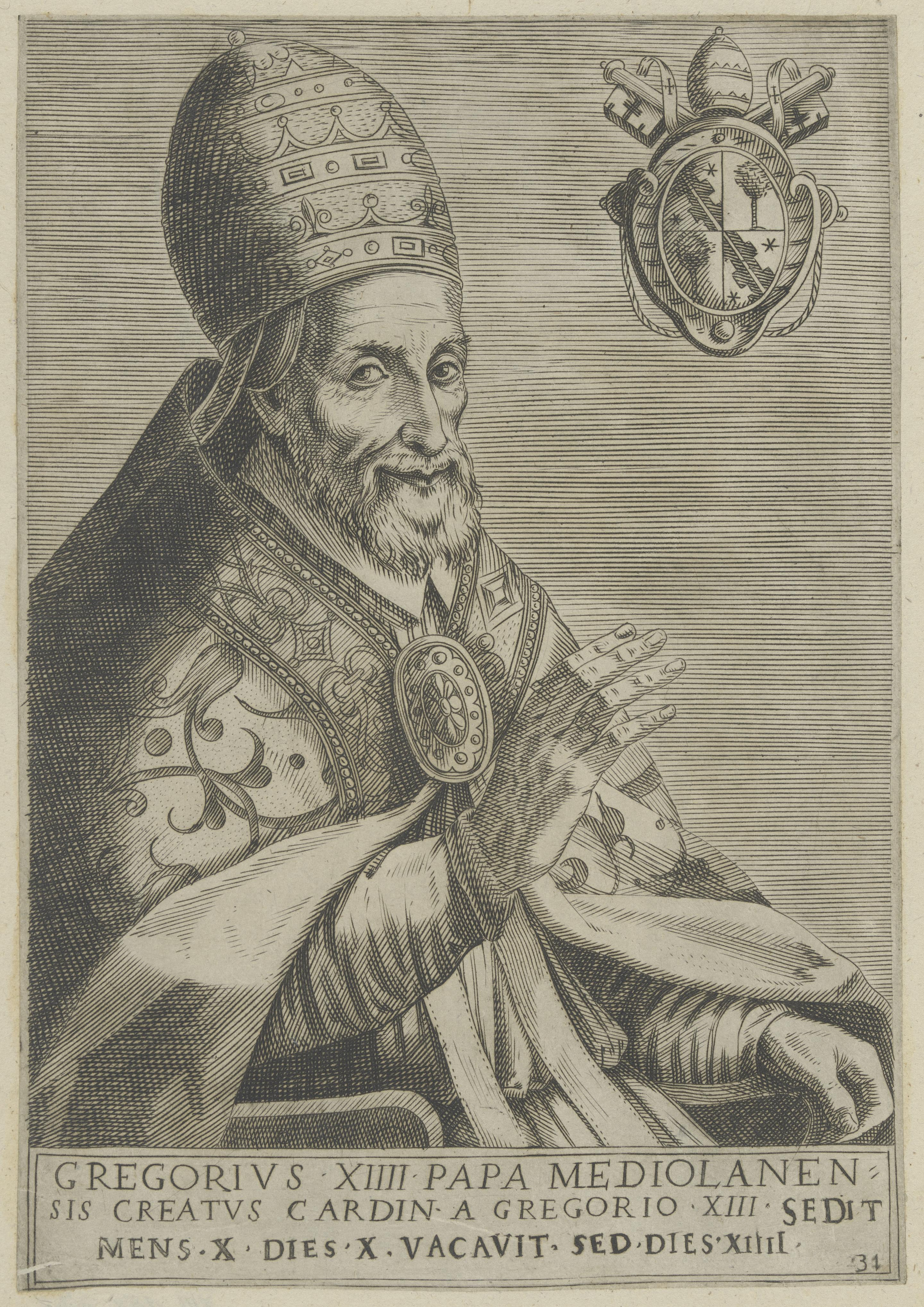
Engraving of Pope Gregory XIV by Philip Galle, c. 1591

Gregory XIV's brief pontificate was marked by vigorous intervention in favour of the Catholic party in the French Wars of Religion. Instigated by the king of Spain and the duke of Mayenne, he excommunicated Henry IV of France on 1 March 1591, reiterating the 1585 declaration of Pope Sixtus V that as a heretic (Protestant) Henry was ineligible to succeed to the throne of Catholic France and ordered the clergy, nobles, judicial functionaries, and the Third Estate of France to renounce him.

Gregory XIV levied an army for the invasion of France, and dispatched his nephew Ercole Sfondrati to France at its head. He also sent a monthly subsidy of 15,000 scudi to Paris to reinforce the Catholic League. By coming down solidly on the side of Spanish interests, in part because Gregory XIV was elected due to the influence of the Spanish cardinals, the recent Papal policy of trying to maintain a balance between Spain and France was abandoned.

Gregory XIV created five cardinals in two consistories, among whom was his nephew Paolo Emilio Sfondrati, his Secretary of State. He attempted to convince Philip Neri, a long-time friend, to accept the post of Cardinal, but Neri refused, saying that there were many more deserving of the honour than him.

In a decree dated 18 April 1591 (Bulla Cum Sicuti), Gregory XIV ordered reparations to be made by Catholics in the Philippines to the natives, who had been forced into slavery by Europeans, and he commanded under pain of excommunication of the owners that all native slaves in the islands be set free.

The biographers mention that Pope Gregory XIV had a nervous tendency to laughter, which occasionally became irresistible and even manifested itself at his coronation. Gregory XIV, who was in poor health before his election to the papacy, died due to a large gallstone and was succeeded by Innocent IX.

== See also ==
- Cardinals created by Gregory XIV

Catholic Church titles
Preceded by Federico Cesi	Bishop of Cremona; 1560 – 1590	Succeeded by Cesare Speciano
Preceded by Urban VII	Pope; 5 December 1590 – 16 October 1591	Succeeded by Innocent IX
