= Forty Hours' Devotion =

Roman Catholic liturgical action

Forty Hours' Devotion, in Italian called Quarant'ore or Quarantore, is a Roman Catholic liturgical action in which continuous prayer is made for forty hours before the Blessed Sacrament in solemn exposition. It often occurs in a succession of churches, with one finishing prayers at the same time as the next takes it up.

A celebration of such a devotion is begun by a Solemn Mass or "Mass of Exposition", and ended by a "Mass of Reposition". The latter concludes with a procession and benediction. The Blessed Sacrament is reposed in the tabernacle for the daily Mass, and then returned for exposition after Mass.

It is assumed that the exposition and prayer should be kept up by night as well as by day, but permission is given to dispense with this requirement when enough watchers cannot be obtained. In such a case, the interruption of the devotion by night does not forfeit the indulgences conceded by the Holy See to those who take part in it.

== History of the devotion ==
The precise origin of the Forty Hours' Devotion is obscure. St. Charles Borromeo speaks as if this practice of praying for forty hours was very ancient; he refers it to the forty hours that Christ's Body remained in the tomb. The number 40 is also associated with the rain at the time of the Flood, years the Israelites spent on the way to the Promised Land, and Jesus fasting for 40 days before beginning his public ministry.

The practice of reserving the Blessed Sacrament with some solemnity during the Easter Triduum began in the 12th or 13th century, From this the idea grew up of transferring this figurative vigil of forty hours to other days and other seasons. The transference to the carnival tide was very obvious, and is likely enough to have occurred independently to many different people.

There is evidence that Giovanni Antonio Bellotti organized this in connection with a certain confraternity at the Church of San Sepolcro in Milan as early as 1527. During the 1520s and 1530s, the Archdiocese of Milan, had this prayer devotion extended beyond Holy Week and often added to Pentecost, the Feast of the Assumption, and Christmas.

Evidence seems to favour the conclusion that the Capuchin Joseph Piantanida da Fermo was the first to organise the arrangement by which the Forty Hours' Exposition was transferred from church to church in Milan and was there kept up without interruption throughout all the year. The Milanese chronicler Burigozzo describes the custom of exposing the Blessed Sacrament in one church after another as a novelty which began at Milan in May 1537. His notice seems to have been actually written in that year. The practice has been attributed to the Milanese Capuchin Giuseppe da Ferno. In November 2021, the Roman Catholic Diocese of Arlington initiated a schedule of Forty Hours’ Devotion in successive parishes in preparation for its Golden Jubilee in 2024.

A Dominican Thomas Nieto, the Barnabite St. Antonio Maria Zaccharia, and his friend Brother Buono of Cremona, known as the Hermit, have also been suggested as the founders of the Forty Hours' Devotion. The claims of the last named, Brother Buono, were urged by Bergamaschi, who contends that the Quarant'Ore had been started by Brother Buono at Cremona in 1529. Philip II of Spain is also credited with having first instituted the Forty Hours' devotion at the Royal Chapel of the Cathedral of Granada. The practice spread rapidly.

But the evidence in all these cases only goes to show that the practice was then being introduced of exposing the Blessed Sacrament with solemnity on occasions of great public calamity or peril, and that for such expositions the period of forty hours was generally selected. In past centuries, especially in the late Middle Ages, the devotion was practiced during times of crisis. Bishops frequently ordered exposition of the Sacrament for "serious and general need." The faithful would come in shifts before the Sacrament seeking God's intercession during events threatening the local community, such as war, epidemics, drought or famine. Later it became common to hold the devotion around the feast of Corpus Christi.

One of the most important documents pertaining to this devotion is the apostolic constitution Graves et diuturnae of Pope Clement VIII, of 25 November 1592, in which the pontiff strongly commended the practice of unwearied prayer.

We have determined to establish publicly in this Mother City of Rome (in hac alma Urbe) an uninterrupted course of prayer in such wise that in the different churches (he specifies the various categories), on appointed days, there be observed the pious and salutary devotion of the Forty Hours, with such an arrangement of churches and times that, at every hour of the day and night, the whole year round, the incense of prayer shall ascend without intermission before the face of the Lord.

As in the case of a previously brief of Paul III, the keynote of this document is anxiety for the peace of Christendom. In 1731 Pope Clement XII issued a very minute code of instructions for the proper carrying out of the Quarant'Ore devotion, which is known as the Instructio Clementina.

The Plenary Council of Baltimore approved the Forty Hours’ Devotion for all Catholic dioceses in the United States in 1866.

== Saints ==
Before the year 1550 this, or some analogous exposition, had been established by St. Philip Neri for the Confraternity of the Santissima Trinità dei Pellegrini in Rome; while St. Ignatius Loyola, also encouraged the practice of exposing the Blessed Sacrament during the carnival as an act of expiation for the sins committed at that season. St. Francis de Sales, who was a great admirer of Philip Neri, incorporated the Forty Hours’ Devotion as part of his missionary outreach among the Calvinists living between Annecy and Geneva between 1594 and 1596. In the United States, Saint John Neumann (1811-1860), bishop of Philadelphia, helped spread the devotion, composing a special booklet for its practice. Bishop Neumann introduced the first Forty Hours’ Devotion at the Church of St. Philip Neri on May 26, 1853, the Feast of Corpus Christi, in honor of the church's patron, despite the hostility of the Know Nothing party.

== Rubrics ==
"Eucharistic adoration is simply the natural consequence of the Eucharistic celebration, which is itself the Church's supreme act of adoration... The act of adoration outside Mass prolongs and intensifies all that takes place during the liturgical celebration itself."

Whereas in the past benediction was frequently added to the end of another service or devotion, this is no longer permitted. Eucharistic exposition and benediction is a complete liturgical service in its own right.

The rules for "Exposition of the Holy Eucharist" are contained in the Roman Ritual: Holy Communion and Worship of the Eucharist Outside Mass. "It is for episcopal conferences, in the preparation of particular rituals in accord with the Constitution on the Liturgy (no. 63b), to accommodate this title of the Roman Ritual to the needs of individual regions so that, their actions having been confirmed by the Apostolic See, the ritual may be followed in the respective regions." In the United States the rules for celebrating the Forty Hours Devotion can be found in the "Order for the Solemn Exposition of the Holy Eucharist" published by the United States Conference of Catholic Bishops in 1992. This document is an adaptation of the Roman Ritual.

Although the forty-hour period should be continuous, some Churches break-up the time, reposing the Blessed Sacrament at night for security reasons.

Other Eucharistic devotions such as Perpetual Adoration and the Holy Hour are outgrowths of the Forty Hours Devotion.

== See also ==
- Easter Sepulchre
- Eucharistic adoration

== Sources ==
- Pietro da Cortona, A Design for a Quarantore at San Lorenzo in Damaso, c.1632
