= Giovanni Battista de Asti =

Roman Catholic prelate

Most Reverend Giovanni Battista de Asti
- Titular Bishop of Thagaste
- Church: Catholic Church
- In office: 1620
- Predecessor: Angelo Rocca
- Successor: Vincenzo Giovanni Spínola

Orders
- Consecration: 31 May 1620 by Giovanni Garzia Mellini

Personal details
- Born: 1566 Albenga, Italy
- Died: 20 September 1620 (age 54)

Giovanni Battista de Asti, O.S.A. (1566–1620) was a Roman Catholic prelate who served as Titular Bishop of Thagaste (1620).

== Biography ==
Giovanni Battista de Asti was born in Albenga, Italy in 1566 and ordained a priest in the Order of Saint Augustine. On 18 May 1620, he was appointed during the papacy of Pope Paul V as Titular Bishop of Thagaste. On 31 May 1620, he was consecrated bishop by Giovanni Garzia Mellini, Cardinal-Priest of Santi Quattro Coronati, with Vincenzo Landinelli, Bishop of Albenga, and Nicolò Spínola, Bishop of Ventimiglia, serving as co-consecrators. He served as Titular Bishop of Thagaste until his death on 20 September 1620.

Catholic Church titles
Preceded by Angelo Rocca	Titular Bishop of Thagaste; 1620	Succeeded by Vincenzo Giovanni Spínola
