= Anthony Zaccaria =

Italian Roman Catholic saint

Saint Anthony Zaccaria CRSP
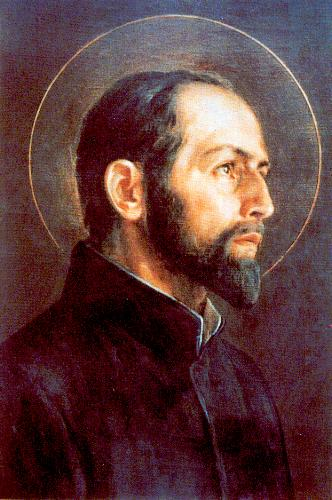

Confessor, Main Founder of Barnabites, Counter-Reformer, Soldier, Priest
- Born: 1502; Cremona, Duchy of Milan (now Italy)
- Died: 5 July 1539; Cremona, Duchy of Milan
- Venerated in: Catholic Church
- Beatified: 3 January 1890, Rome by Pope Leo XIII
- Canonized: 27 May 1897, Rome by Pope Leo XIII
- Major shrine: San Paolo convent, Milan, Italy
- Feast: 5 July
- Attributes: Black cassock, lily, Cross, Chalice, Host
- Patronage: The Barnabite order, Angelic Sisters of St. Paul, Laity of St. Paul, Physicians

Anthony Maria Zaccaria, CRSP (Italian: Antonio Maria Zaccaria; 1502 – 5 July 1539) was an Italian Catholic priest and early leader of the Counter-Reformation. He was the founder of the Barnabites and a promoter of devotion to the Passion of Christ and the Eucharist and of renewal of the religious life among the laity. He is venerated as a saint in the Catholic Church, which celebrates his feast day on 5 July.

== Life ==
Anthony Zaccaria was born in the city of Cremona, Italy, in December 1502 to Lazzaro and Antonia Pescaroli Zaccaria. He was baptized the same day in Cremona Cathedral, probably by his uncle Don Tommaso Zaccaria, canon of the cathedral. When he was two, his father died. His family was of the nobility, and in order to teach him compassion for the poor, his mother made him her almoner.

After attending the Episcopal School annexed to the cathedral, he studied philosophy at the University of Pavia, and, from 1520, medicine at the University of Padua. After completing studies in 1524, he returned to Cremona and practised as a physician for three years. In 1527, he started studying for the priesthood, and continued his theological studies in Bologna.

On 20 February 1529 Zaccaria was ordained a priest in the Chapel of Saint Joseph in Cremona Cathedral. Having explored his calling, mainly by working in hospitals and institutions for the poor, he became spiritual advisor to Countess Ludovica Torelli of Guastalla (then the tiny County of Guastalla), and in 1530 followed her to Milan. There, he became a member of the Oratory of Eternal Wisdom, where he met Bartolomeo Ferrari and Giacomo Antonio Morigia.

Their devotions mainly focused on the teachings of St Paul with emphasis on love for the Eucharist and for Christ crucified. They were soon joined by others. They gave instruction in the rudiments of the faith, gave missions in parishes in the city and elsewhere, and cared for the sick in the hospitals. Zaccaria preached regularly in the churches and on street corners and is credited for reviving the custom of ringing church bells in Milan at 3:00 p.m. on Fridays, in remembrance of the passion and death of Jesus. Despite arousing some opposition, the group persevered undaunted.

In 1533, having received encouragement from Pope Clement VII, Zaccaria took a small house near the church of St. Catherine at the Ponte dei Fabbri, and here they began their community life. The congregation was named after the companion of St. Paul, St. Barnabas. In 1534 at St. Catherine's, he popularized the Forty-hour devotion for the laity – the solemn exposition of the Blessed Sacrament for adoration by the faithful – accompanied by preaching. In July 1535 Pope Paul III issued a Bull of approbation, confirming Anthony and his companions in their devotion to St. Paul.

In July 1537 Zaccaria accompanied the first Pauline missionaries (Barnabites, Angelic Sisters, and Laity of St. Paul) and some collaborators (Castellino da Castello and Fra Bono Lizzari) to Vicenza for the opening of the congregation's second house.

While on mission to Guastalla in 1539, he caught a fever and this, combined with the effect of strict penances he practised, lead to worsened health. In June he wrote to the Omodei family in Milan, speaking of a great "weariness of the body." He felt that his end was imminent and wanted to be brought back to Cremona on the boat operated by merchants which made regular stops (in Cremona and Casalmaggiore) on their trade route along the Po River.

Anthony Zaccaria died on Saturday, 5 July 1539, at the age of 36, at three o’clock in the afternoon, in the house where he had been born, in the arms of his mother and surrounded by his first companions.

The suffragan bishop, Luca di Seriate, who had ordained him a priest, presided over his funeral. In attendance were the aristocrats and people of Cremona and the surrounding towns. He was buried in the San Paolo Convent of the Angelics of Saint Paul, the female branch of the Barnabites, in Milan. In his last will and testament, he provided for the construction in his parish, Saint Donato, of a chapel in honor of the Conversion of St. Paul.

== Foundations ==
While in Milan, he laid the foundations of three religious institutes: one for men (the Clerics Regular of Saint Paul, commonly known as the Barnabites); a female branch of uncloistered nuns, the Angelic Sisters of St. Paul; and a lay congregation for married people, the Laity of Saint Paul, originally called the Married of Saint Paul (sometimes called the Oblates of Saint Paul in North America). The three foundations met regularly, and engaged together in various forms of apostolic action. Their aim was the reform of decadent society, beginning with the clergy and religious.

=== The Clerics Regular of St. Paul (the Barnabites) ===
"The Congregation of the Regular Clerks of St. Paul" was canonically sanctioned by Pope Clement VII in 1533. Since the order criticized what they saw as abuses in the Church, Zaccaria soon gained a number of enemies, and as the order's founder, he was twice investigated for heresy, in 1534 and 1537. He was acquitted both times. In 1536, he stepped down as General of the Order. Giacomo Antonio Morigia was elected Superior. Zaccaria went to Vicenza, where he reformed two convents and founded the Order's second house.

=== The Angelic Sisters of St. Paul ===
On 15 January 1535 Pope Paul III approved the Angelic Sisters with the Bull, Debitum pastoralis officii. On 25 December Zaccaria celebrated Mass for the first time at the Oratory of the Monastery of Saint Paul. On 27 February 1536 Zaccaria conferred the habit on six postulants of the Angelic Sisters. Zaccaria appointed Paola Antonia Negri as mistress of novices on 4 March 1537.

== Veneration ==
After his death, a number of cures were attributed to the intercession of Anthony Mary Zaccaria. 27 years after his death, his body was found to be incorrupt. His mortal remains are now enshrined at the Church of Saint Barnabas in Milan, Italy. He was canonized by Pope Leo XIII on 27 May 1897. His feast day is celebrated on 5 July, and he is a patron saint of physicians.

=== Iconography ===
In art, he is depicted wearing the black cassock of the Order and holding a lily, cross, chalice and/or a host.

== Writings ==
He has left only a few writings: twelve letters, six sermons, and the constitution of the Barnabites.

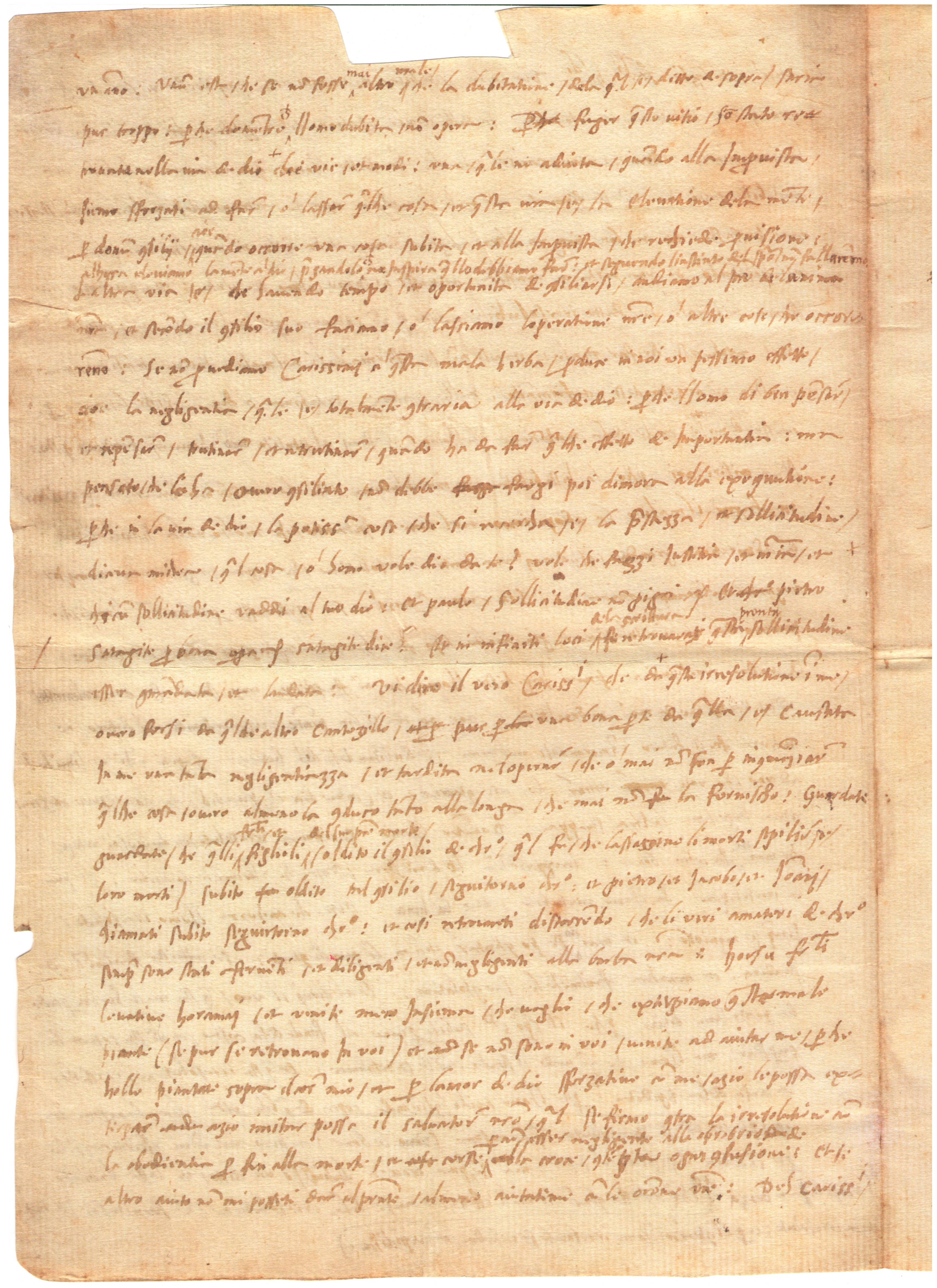
The Manuscript of Letter 2 of St. Anthony Mary Zaccaria

=== Letters ===
There are eleven letters signed by Anthony Mary. Four are original manuscripts: Letter II (addressed to Bartolomeo Ferrari and Giacomo Antonio Morigia, 4 January 1531); Letter IV (to Giovan Giacomo Piccinini, 16 January 1534); Letter VI (to Ferrari, 8 October 1538); and Letter VII (to Battista Soresina, 3 November 1538). Of the other seven, we have only copies, though they are very early. Three letters are cosigned by Anthony Mary and Angelic Paola Antonia Negri. They are, Letter VI, Letter VII], and Letter VIII. In addition, there is a twelfth letter: though it bears only Negri's signature, it was without a doubt penned by Anthony Mary. In fact, the original manuscript of this letter is in Anthony Mary's own handwriting.

One letter is addressed to Fra Battista da Crema (Letter I); two are addressed to the Angelics (Letter V and Letter IX); three to laymen (Letter III, Letter IV, and Letter XI); and four to the Barnabites (Letter II, Letter VII, Letter VIII, and Letter X). One (Letter VI) is addressed to Bartolomeo Ferrari, but it is meant for both Barnabites and Angelics who were doing missionary work in Vicenza.

The eleven letters cover a nine-year period, 1530 to 1539. However, there are gaps between 1531 and 1534, and between 1534 and 1537. Letter IX and Letter XII are undated. The last three letters, a remarkable total of 2,200 words penned in the brief space of ten busy days, were addressed to an Angelic, a Barnabite, and a Married Couple. Written respectively on 10, 11, and 20 June 1539, that is, within less than a month of his death, these letters unwittingly became, as it were, his final testament to the three families of his foundation. Anthony Mary's letters do not belong to any literary genre nor can they be styled “spiritual letters” per se. They were occasional writings dashed off without any concern for style, in plain, totally unadorned language. However, they do contain a wealth of extraordinary spirituality, a fact easily recognized by his earliest biographers.

Anthony Mary himself, in his last letter, pointedly remarked: “I have not written one word without some special meaning in it. If you discover it, it will be, I think, most useful and gainful for you.”

==== The 12 Letters of St. Anthony Mary Zaccaria ====
- Letter 1 - Being Thankful to God
- Letter 2 - Remedies for Irresoluteness
- Letter 3 - Unceasing Prayer
- Letter 4 - Confidence in God in the Face of Difficulty
- Letter 5 - Spiritual Renewal and Progress
- Letter 6 - Spiritual Progress & Christian Service
- Letter 7 - Christ’s Will Versus One’s Own Will
- Letter 8 - Trust in the Lord
- Letter 9 - The Saints, True Imitators of Christ
- Letter 10 - Steady Growth in Holiness
- Letter 11 - Becoming Great Saints
- Letter 12 - God’s Gift of Light

LISTEN FREE TO THE 12 LETTERS OF ST. ANTHONY MARY

=== Sermons ===
The manuscript codex of the Sermons is kept in the General Archives of the Barnabites in Rome. It was entrusted by Anthony Mary's mother to the Angelics of Santa Marta Convent in Cremona. Early Barnabite historian, Father Giovanni Antonio Gabuzio, retrieved it during his stay in that city from 1584 to 1595. It is an index-notebook. When he was a student at the University of Padua, Anthony Mary recorded in it some lines of the philosopher, Averroës. Later on, as a priest in Cremona, he wrote in it the talks on the Ten Commandments, which he gave at the Amicizia Oratory in Saint Vitalis Church. Clearly, he planned to write out ten sermons, one on each commandment. However, the notebook contains only five sermons: four on the first four commandments. The fifth one is on the commandment, but is only half finished. Sermon I has an appendix on how nuns should practice the first commandment. It was likely intended for the Augustinian Community of Santa Maria Annunziata in Cremona.

A sixth sermon was part of a projected trilogy on moral and spiritual lukewarmness. The Sermons are addressed to noble laymen, who were married and had children, and were active members of the Amicizia Oratory, in the years 1529-1530 when Anthony Mary was a priest; however, their content is applicable to everyone. The above-mentioned appendix to Sermon I proves it. All the Sermons have the same structure. They are divided in two parts. The first one treats of a specific theme. In Sermon I it is the “due order” of the spiritual life; in Sermon II, “true spiritual life”; in Sermon III, “acknowledgment”; in Sermon IV, love; in Sermon V, passions; in Sermon VI, the “way of God.” The second part of Sermons 1–V is an extensive exposition of each commandment and its practice. In the case of Sermon VI, the second part is a detailed explanation of lukewarmness.

The Sermons exhibit a more elaborate style than that of the Letters. The language, though direct, reveals greater care and elegance. The reasoning is cogently logical and is structured on solid theological preparation. The numerous Biblical quotations reveal a mastery of the Scriptures.

Recently, a hypothesis was put forth, saying the Sermons are not liturgical homilies but opening talks given at the Amicizia Oratory meetings, where all present could then speak. It is noteworthy that Anthony Mary reserves the term “sermon” only for his talk on lukewarmness.

==== List of Sermons ====
- Sermon 1
- Sermon 2
- Sermon 3
- Sermon 4
- Sermon 5
- Sermon 6
- Sermon 7

=== Constitutions ===
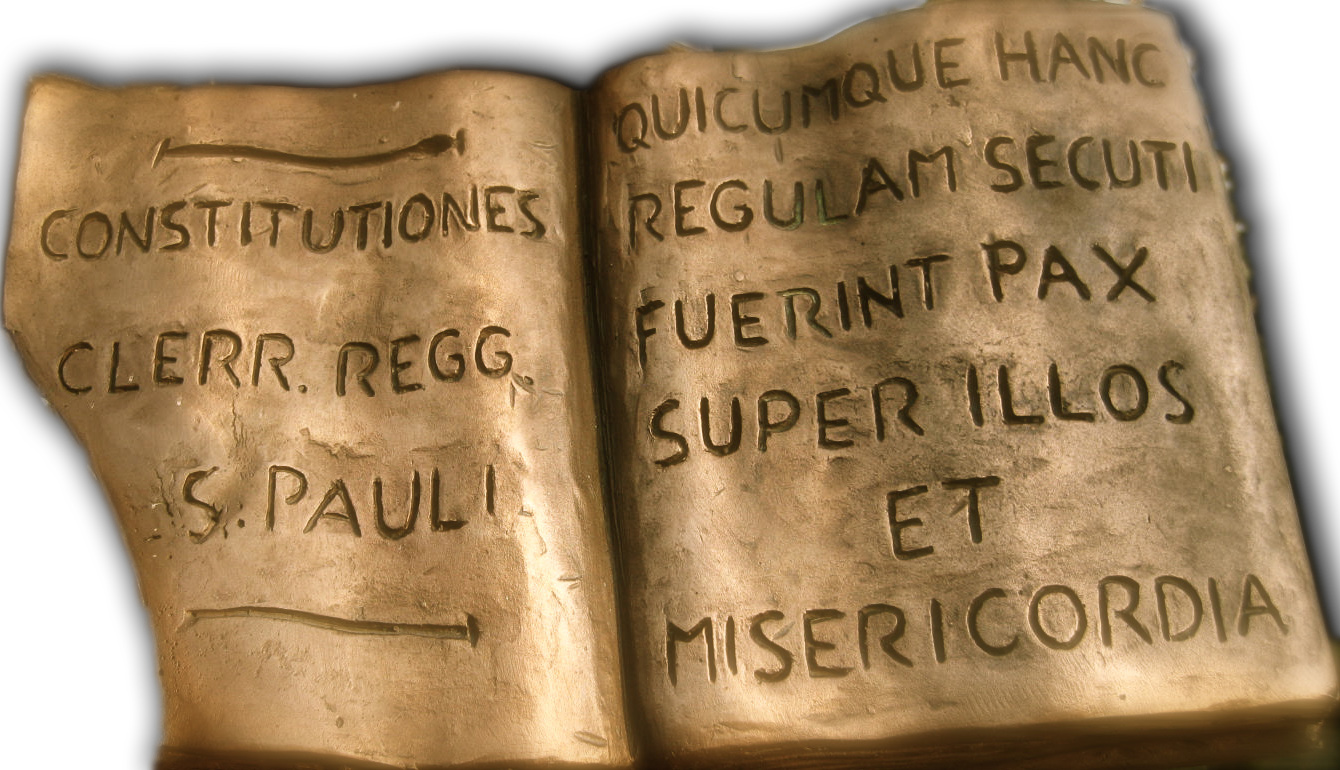
Representation of the Constitutions of 1579

No original manuscript of the Constitutions survive, only a very early copy. The Constitutions is no more than an extended outline. It was never approved nor promulgated, hence, it was never binding. In all probability, it is a reworked translation of a previous Latin outline by Fra Battista, the so-called “Primitive Constitutions.” It was a basic text worked on by the first Fathers toward a definitive text.

The available text consists of 19 chapters, but a close scrutiny points to several layers of composition. There is a conclusion at the end of Chapter 16; another one at the end of Chapter 18; and a third one at the end of Chapter 19. This is evidence that the text went through several writings and underwent multiple reworking.

A letter of Father Nicolò D’Aviano, dated October 10, 1570 (even as the definitive Constitutions of 1579 were being redacted), informs us that three chapters of the Constitutions were undoubtedly written by Anthony Mary himself. They are Chapter 12: “Formation of Novices”; Chapter 17: “Signs of Deteriorating 17 Religious Life”; and Chapter 19: “Qualities of a Reformer.” In addition, Anthony Mary's hand can be recognized, more or less, throughout the entire document.

The Constitutions is a document of laws, hence its classification in the juridical literary genre. However, in Anthony Mary's additions, the peremptory style turns exhortatory. This change of style helps locate Anthony Mary's interpolations in the original text of Battista da Crema.

== Bibliography ==
- Marcello Landi, La presenza della Summa Theologiae di Tommaso d'Aquino nei primi due Sermoni di Antonio Maria Zaccaria in Barnabiti Studi 20 (2003), pp. 69–81
- Marcello Landi, Sant'Antonio Maria Zaccaria. Contesto storico-culturale e presenza della Summa Theologiae di san Tommaso d'Aquino nei suoi primi tre sermoni, in Sacra Doctrina. Studi e ricerche n. 52 (3/2006), pp. 46–81
- Fr. Franco Maria Chilardotti, CRSP, 2009 Antonio Maia Zaccaria 1502-1539 : Una meteora del ciquecento nella scia di Paolo Apostolo.
