= Arcangela Panigarola =

Italian Augustinian nun (1468–1525)

Panigarola receiving a vision, from a manuscript of her revelations. Probably painted by Marco d'Oggiono.

Margherita Panigarola (1468 – 17 January 1525), known by the religious name Arcangela, was an Italian Augustinian nun and mystic.

Panigarola was born in Milan in 1468, the daughter of Gottardo Panigarola and Costanza San Pietro. Baptised Margherita, she took the name Arcangela when she entered the convent of Santa Marta in 1483. She served three terms as prioress (1500–1503, 1506–1508, 1512–1525). She died on 17 January 1525 during an outbreak of plague.

Panigarola's prophetic revelations were written down by Giovanni Antonio Bellotti with authorization from Pope Leo X. From 1514, they increasingly concern the reform of the church and the coming of an angelic pope. She was familiar with the Apocalypsis nova of Amadeus of Portugal, recently brought to light by Juraj Dragišić, to whom she refers in her letters. One 100 of her letters survive, including ones to Jacopo de' Medici and the brothers Guillaume and Denis Briçonnet.

== Bibliography ==
- Bacchiddu, Rita (2014). "Panigarola, Margherita". Dizionario Biografico degli Italiani (in Italian). Vol. 80: Ottone–Pansa. Rome: Istituto dell'Enciclopedia Italiana. ISBN 978-88-12-00032-6.
- Gagné, John (2020). Milan Undone: Contested Sovereignties in the Italian Wars. Harvard University Press. doi:10.4159/9780674249936.
- Gallori, Corinna T. (2018). "Las revelaciones de Arcangela Panigarola: entre profetismo y devoción". In Stefania Pastore; Mercedes García-Arenal (eds.). Visiones imperiales y profecía: Roma, España, Nuevo Mundo (PDF). Abada Editores. pp. 219–243.
- Herzig, Tamar (2008). Savonarola's Women: Visions and Reform in Renaissance Italy. University of Chicago Press.
- Richardson, Brian (2020). Women and the Circulation of Texts in Renaissance Italy. Cambridge University Press.
