= Santa Marta, Milan =

Former Convent in Milan, Italy

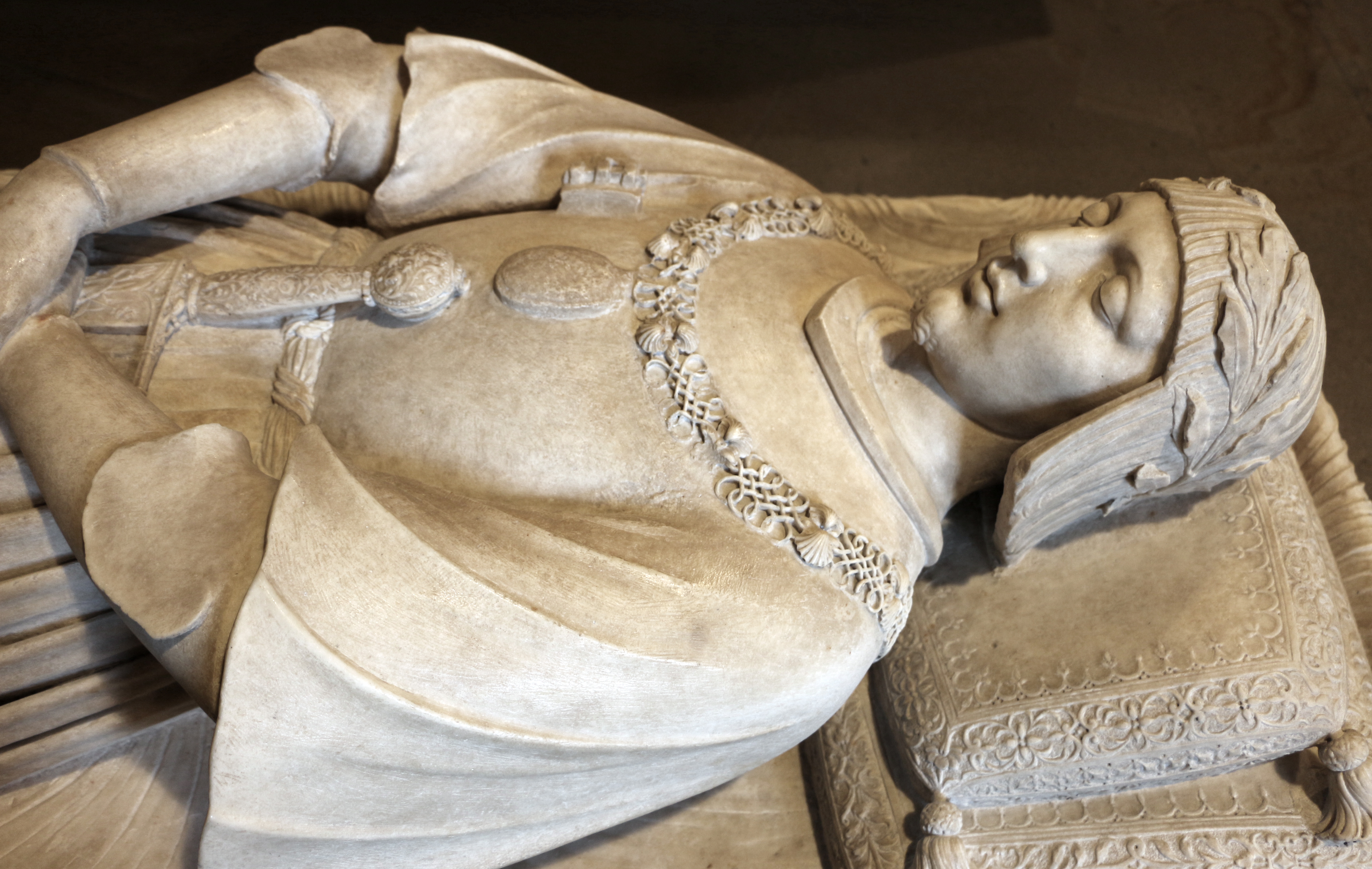
The funerary monument of Gaston de Foix was formerly in Santa Marta.

Santa Marta was an Augustinian convent of nuns in Milan between 1345 and 1799.

In the 1460s, Santa Marta joined the Observant Reform. The complex was expanded in the 1470s. The church was rebuilt in 1511 with funding from King Louis XII of France. The architect Francesco Maria Richini undertook major work between 1621 and 1624. Following its closure, it was dismantled between 1806 and 1875. Today, a high school occupies the site.

During the Italian Wars, Santa Marta was pro-French. It hosted the funerary monument of Gaston de Foix by Agostino Busti. Other artists who worked for Santa Marta include Bernardino Luini, Bernardo Zenale and Marco d'Oggiono.

From the 1470s to the 1520s, Santa Marta was famous for its mystics: Colomba de Suardi, Liberata da Giussano, Benedetta da Vimercate, Taddea da Ferrara, Veronica Negroni da Binasco and Arcangela Panigarola. Benedetta was also a scribe. Another nun, Veronica Stampa, wrote a chronicle of the convent in the sixteenth century.

The Oratory of Eternal Wisdom was a confraternity centred on Santa Marta in the early sixteenth century.

== Bibliography ==
- Bacchiddu, Rita (2014). "Panigarola, Margherita". Dizionario Biografico degli Italiani (in Italian). Vol. 80: Ottone–Pansa. Rome: Istituto dell'Enciclopedia Italiana. ISBN 978-88-12-00032-6.
- Gagné, John (2020). Milan Undone: Contested Sovereignties in the Italian Wars. Harvard University Press. doi:10.4159/9780674249936.
- Quattrini, Cristina (2013). "Il cantiere di Santa Marta a Milano fra secondo e terzo decennio del Cinquecento". In Frédéric Elsig; Mauro Natale (eds.). Le Duché de Milan et les cammanditaires français (1499–1521). Viella. pp. 237–265.
- Richardson, Brian (2020). Women and the Circulation of Texts in Renaissance Italy. Cambridge University Press.
