= Ludovica Torelli =

Countess of Guastalla (1500–1569)

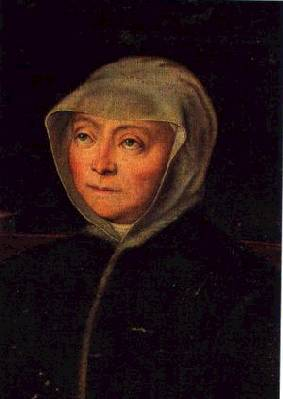
Ludovica Torelli

Ludovica Torelli (26 September 1500 – 28 October 1569) was ruling Countess of Guastalla in 1522–1539. A philanthropist, she was instrumental in the founding of two religious institutes for woman: the Angelic Sisters of Saint Paul and the "Collegio della Guastalla"/"Daughters of Mary".

== Life ==
She was the daughter of Achille Torelli, Count of Guastalla and his wife, Veronica Pallavicini. Her younger brother Francesco died at a young age, leaving her sole heir. Her father died in battle at Luzzara in 1522, making her Countess of Guastalla. She devoted herself to parties, studies, pomp, court life and all that involved her role as Countess.

In 1521, her four-year old son Achille died, and then her husband, Cremonese nobleman Count Ludovico Stanghi. She remarried in 1525 Antonio Martinengo. Martinengo was a violent individual, impatient to gain control of her estates. On more than one occasion he forced her to go hunting with him, on a recalcitrant horse, over dangerous terrain. He was murdered on 18 April 1528 by a brother-in-law. Twice-widowed by age twenty-five, Ludovica had to contend with covetous relatives eager to take over her possessions, who thought she should withdraw to a convent. Neighboring lords pressed real or presumed rights on her territory. Incensed that she had spent a portion of her wealth on armed guards, the Torelli's of Montechiarugolo and Casei repeatedly attempted to ambush her.

== Milan ==
Gianpietro Carafa called her "free, wealthy, and quick-witted", although not entirely with approval. By 1530 Ludovica began to live primarily in Milan, returning to Guastalla occasionally during the year. She was very religious, and had as spiritual guides Battista Carioni da Crema and Antonio Maria Zaccaria, who became her chaplain. The County of Guastalla, which she had inherited from her father, was laid claim to by another branch of the family, and the affair carried before Pope Clement VIII and Emperor Charles V, whereupon she settled the matter by disposing of her estates in October 1539 to condottiero Ferrante Gonzaga, who needed a fortified port on the river from which to defend against the French.

=== Angelic Sisters of Saint Paul ===
She used the funds to establish a convent of the Angelic Sisters of Saint Paul, and took the name "Paola Maria". The Angelicals were intended to be the female counterpart of the Barnabite Fathers. With other Angelicals she accompanied the Barnabites on their missions, working among women.

Pope Paul III approved the institute; Pope Paul IV opposed its continuation independently and in 1552 imposed the rule of cloister. Due to her friendship with Gonzaga, Ludovica was suspected of supporting proto-Protestant groups and she was called before the Holy Office. When it was established that she had not professed any vows, her status as a laywoman was confirmed.

=== Collegio della Guastalla ===
She had intended the Angelicals for works of active charity, particularly the care of the sick, orphans and impoverished nobility. She left the convent, retaining control of her property. In 1557, she instituted another community, also at Milan, for whom she built a house between the Roman and the Tosa gate, known as the "Collegio della Guastalla". Like the Angelicals, they were under the direction of the Barnabites. The members, known as "Daughters of Mary", dedicated themselves to the care of orphaned girls of noble family. After the death of the foundress, Pope Urban VIII, at the instance of Charles Borromeo, enclosed the community.

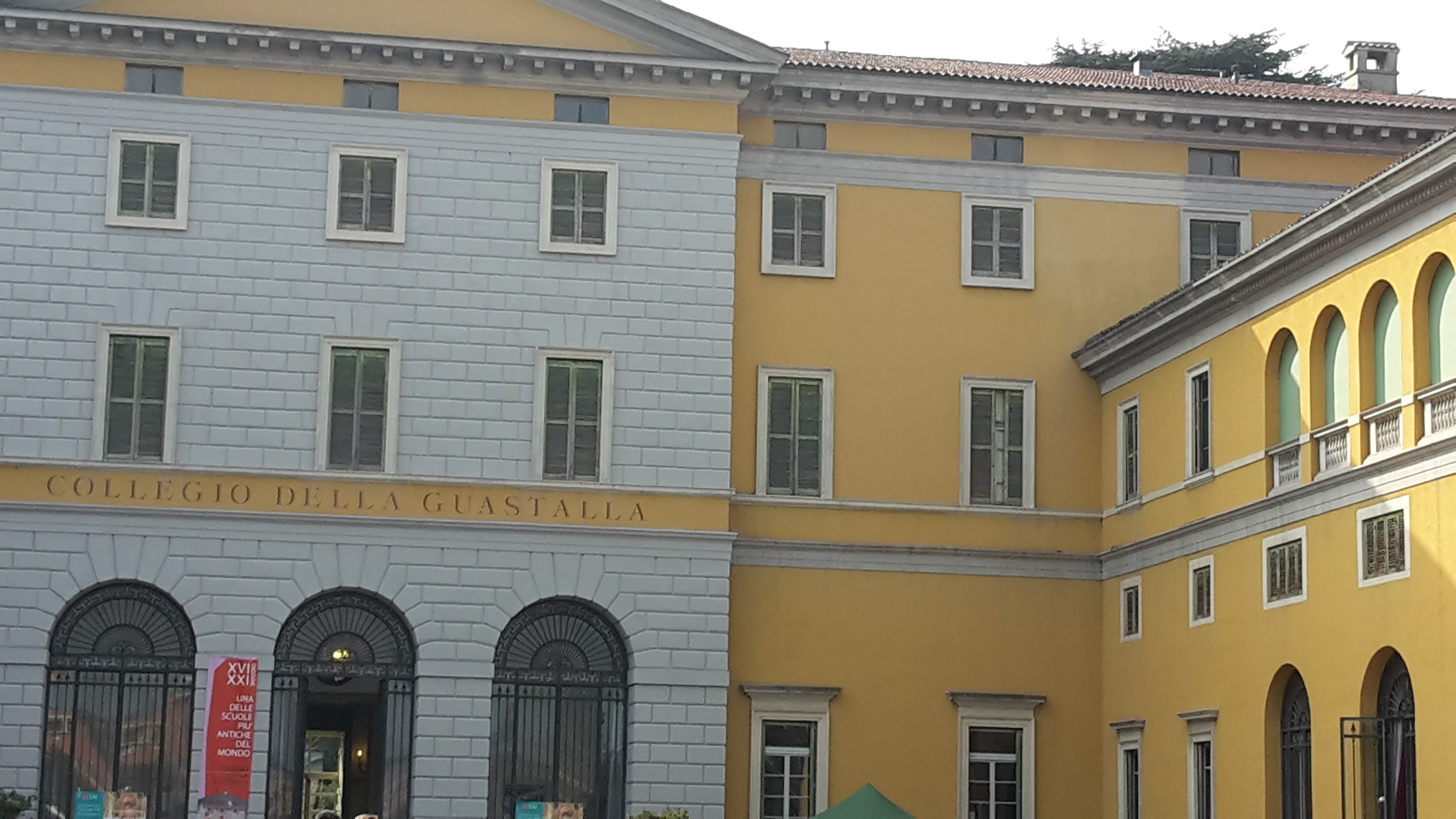
Villa Pallavicini-Barbò, Monza

Ludovica financed many good works in Milan, supported the newly established order of the Barnabites and was a patron of religious associations for women. She established or assisted in the establishment of several other religious houses in various parts of Italy. She died in 1569 and was buried in the Church of San Fedele in Milan. In 1938, when the "Collegio della Guastalla" was transferred to the Villa Pallavicini-Barbò in Monza, in her body was placed in the chapel of the villa.

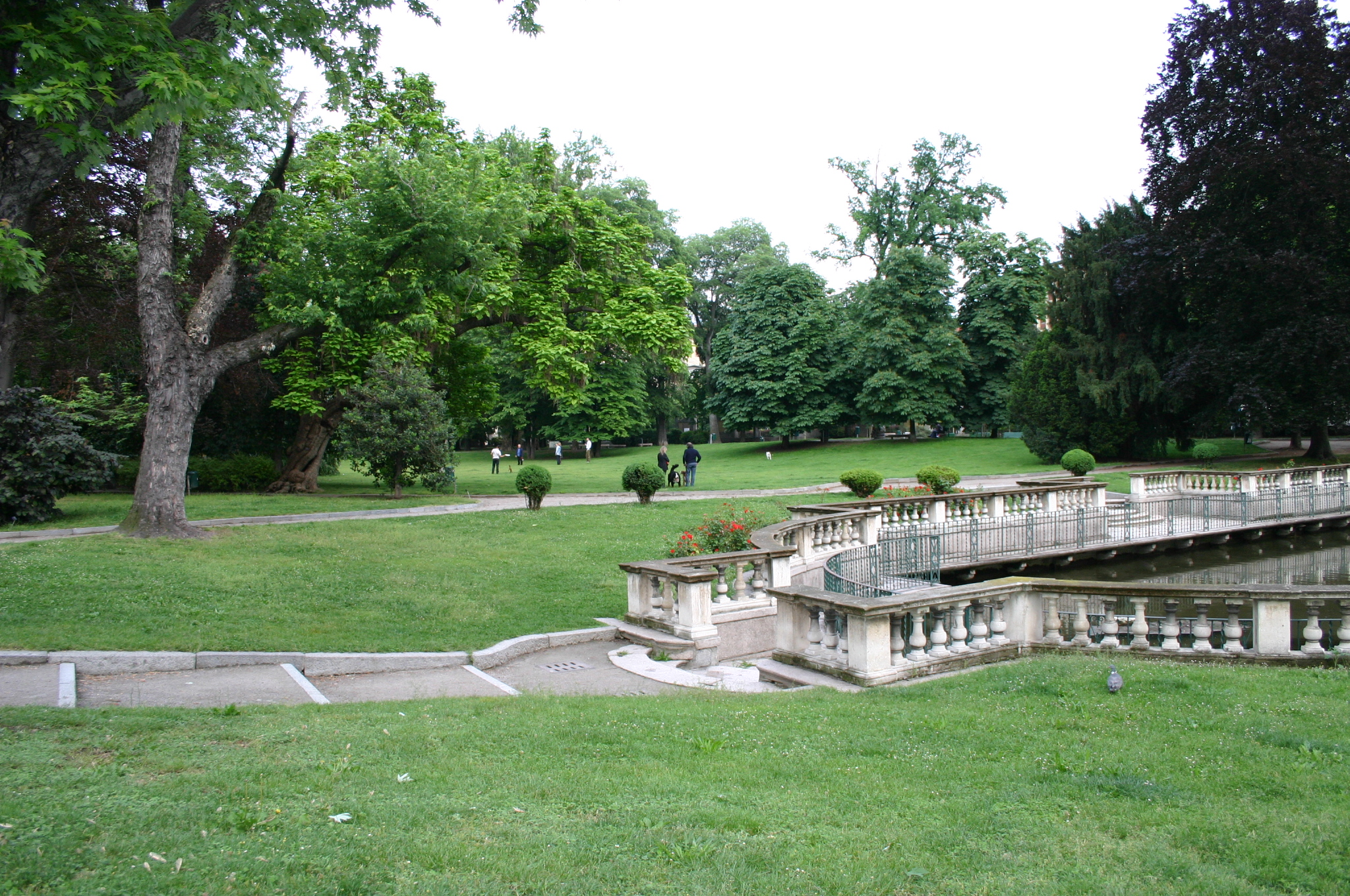
Giardini della Guastalla

== Legacy ==
The complex of buildings of the original "Collegio della Guastalla" was enclosed by high walls; a rectangular pond was drained in the seventeenth century for hygienic reasons, and replaced by a Baroque style fish pond. It is a main feature of the "Giardino della Guastalla", the oldest park in Milan.

== See also ==
- Ducal Palace of Guastalla
- Paola Antonia Negri, co-foundress of the Angelic Sisters

== Sources ==
- Aldo Zagni, La contessa di Guastalla, Reggiolo, Edizioni del Corno d'oro 1987.
- Fabio Arlati, Ludovica Torelli, in Dizionario Biografico degli Italiani, Vol. 96, 2019.

Preceded by Achille Torelli	Count of Guastalla; 1522–1539	Succeeded by Ferrante I Gonzaga
