= Angelic Sisters of Saint Paul =

Roman Catholic order

Angelic Sisters of St. Paul
- Sorores Angelicae Sancti Pauli
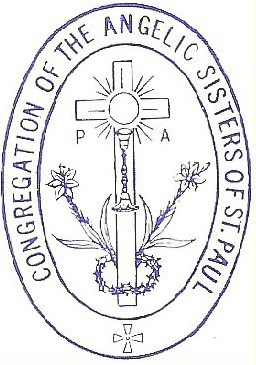
- Emblem ASP
- Abbreviation: ASP
- Formation: 1535; 491 years ago
- Founder: Anthony Mary Zaccaria
- Founded at: Milan, Italy
- Type: Catholic religious order
- Headquarters: Milan, Italy
- Superior General: Mo. Elaine Alnaissi, ASP
- Ministry: List: Education; Missionaries; Pastoral; Hospices for the elderly; Pastoral counselling of men and women in prison; Religious education; Eucharistic ministry to shut-ins; Youth ministry; Vocational Apostolate; Ministry in Spiritual Centers
- Patron: Blessed Virgin Mary (Under the title Mary, Mother of Divine Providence); St. Paul the Apostle
- Main organ: Barnabite Publications
- Parent organization: Catholic Church
- Website: https://www.barnabites.com/angelic-sisters-of-st-paul/

The Angelic Sisters of Saint Paul (Latin: Sorores Angelicae Sancti Pauli) are a Roman Catholic religious order founded by Anthony Maria Zaccaria in Milan, Italy in 1535.

The order is a female branch of the Barnabite Fathers. Their purpose was to be co-workers with the Barnabite Fathers (founded by the same founder) in bringing about a renewal of faith in a society that had become very worldly.

== History ==
The Angelic Sisters were founded in the sixteenth century (1535) in Milan (Italy), by Anthony Maria Zaccaria. The Angelicals worked to educate girls and assist poor women. In 1537 Cardinal Niccolò Ridolfi invited them to Vicenza, where they received the support of the Valmarana family. Other convents soon followed in Verona, Padua, and Venice.

In 1552, by a Papal decree, the Angelic Sisters were asked to become a cloistered community, thus discontinuing their active apostolate. The last Angelica died in 1846, but the congregation was re-established in 1879 by Barnabite Fr Pio Mauri. During World War I convents at Arienzo in Campania, took over the direction of homes for war orphans. It was not until 1926 that another Papal decree, dated July 5 (feast of Saint Anthony Maria Zaccaria) authorized the Congregation of the Angelic Sisters of Saint Paul to restore its original purpose of active life.

== Present day ==
They serve in Brazil, Belgium, Democratic Republic of Congo, Spain, Portugal, Kosovo, United States, Albania, Philippines, Chile and recently in Poland, Indonesia, and Rwanda.

The Istituto San Paolo in Rome has 600 pupils. The sisters in Rwanda run an orphanage for 140 children. The Angelic Sisters offer retreats at Villa Santa Rita in Segni, Italy.

== See also ==
- Ludovica Torelli
