= Cremona (disambiguation) =

Cremona is a city in northern Italy.

Cremona may also refer to:

== Places ==
- The Province of Cremona in northern Italy
- Cremona (crater), a lunar crater
- Cremona, Alberta, a village in Southern Alberta, Canada

== People ==
- Eusebius of Cremona, a 5th-century Italian monk, pre-congregational saint, and disciple of Jerome
- Himerius of Cremona, Saint (died ca. 560), also known as Himerius of Amelia or Irnerius, Italian Roman Catholic bishop
- Gerard of Cremona (1114–1187), Italian translator
- Roland of Cremona (1178–1259), Italian Dominican theologian and an early scholastic philosopher
- Sicard of Cremona (1155–1215), Italian prelate, historian and writer
- Simon of Cremona (died 1390), Italian writer and well-known preacher of the Augustinian Order
- Girolamo da Cremona, also known as Girolamo de'Corradi, (fl. 1451–1483) Italian Renaissance painter, illuminator and miniaturist of manuscripts
- Luigi Cremona (1830–1903), Italian mathematician
  - Cremona diagram, a graphical method used in statics of trusses
- Tranquillo Cremona (1837–1878), Italian painter
- Emvin Cremona (1919–1987), Maltese artist
- Ena Cremona (1936–2024), Maltese judge
- Paul Cremona O.P. (1946–2025), Maltese theologian and Roman Catholic Archbishop of Malta
- Llywelyn Cremona (born 1995), Maltese professional footballer
- Mónica Astorga Cremona (born 1967), Argentine nun
- Orazio Cremona (born 1989), South African athlete specialising in the shot put
- Rebecca Cremona, Maltese film director
- Giordano Cremona (born 1992), Italian EDM producer and DJ, half of Merk & Kremont

== Others ==
- 44 Infantry Division Cremona, an Italian infantry division of World War II
- Cremona (album), a 1996 album by Mina
- Cremona (bread), a traditional Argentine bread
- Cremona, a junior synonym of the moth genus Athrips
- Cremona cotoneastri, a moth of the family Gelechiidae
- Strunal CZ, a.s., formerly the Cremona cooperative, a music instrument manufacturer
- U.S. Cremonese, an Italian football club based in Cremona
