= Geremia Bonomelli =

Italian bishop (1831–1914)

- Bishop of Cremona
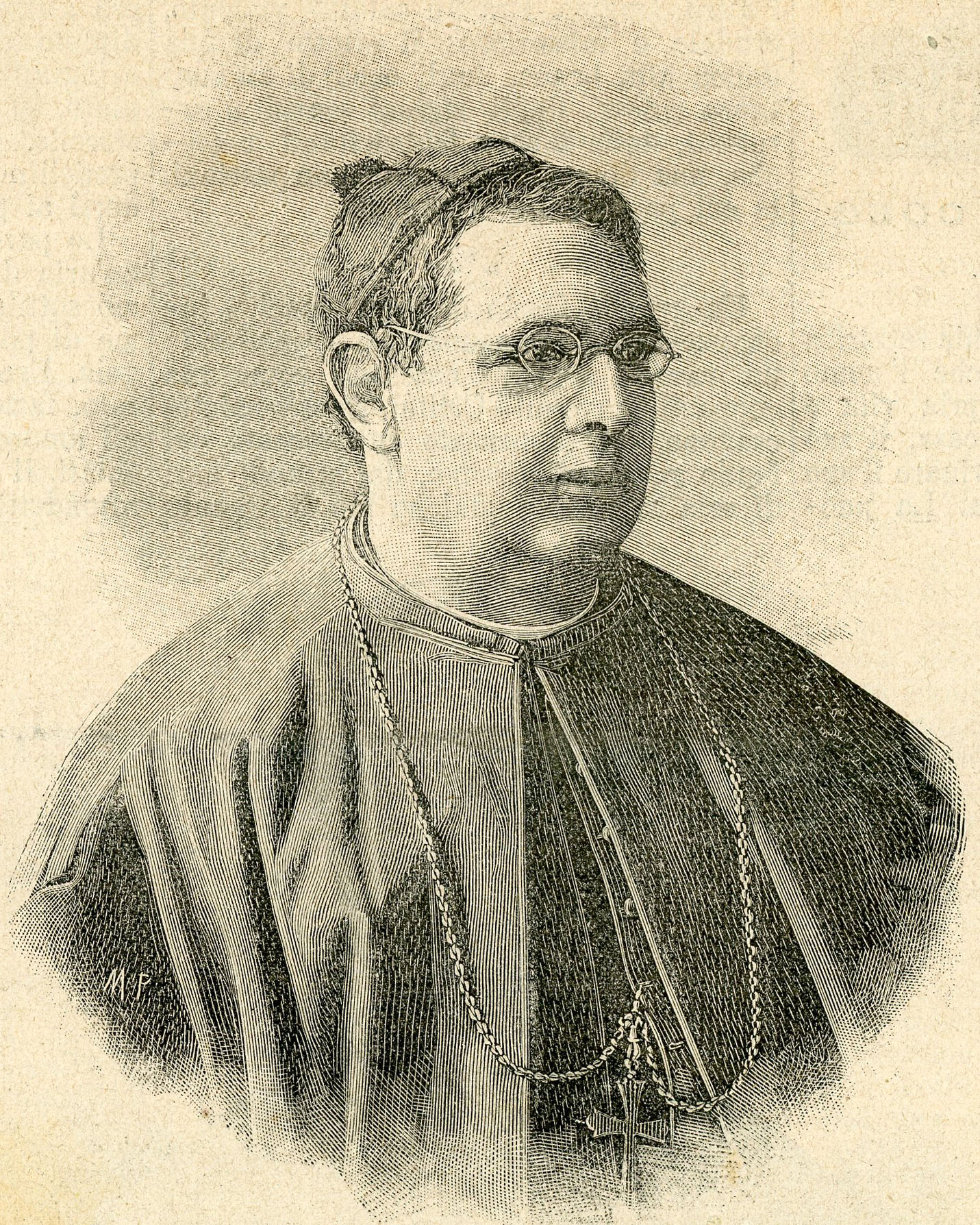
- Church: Catholic Church
- Diocese: Diocese of Cremona
- In office: 27 October 1871 – 3 August 1914
- Predecessor: Antonio Novasconi
- Successor: Giovanni Cazzani

Orders
- Ordination: 2 June 1855
- Consecration: 26 November 1871 by Girolamo Verzeri

Personal details
- Born: 22 September 1831 Nigoline, Corte Franca, Province of Brescia, Kingdom of Lombardy–Venetia, Austrian Empire
- Died: 3 August 1914 (aged 82)

Styles of Geremia Bonomelli
- Reference style: The Most Reverend
- Spoken style: Your Excellency
- Religious style: Monsignor
- Posthumous style: none

Geremia Bonomelli (22 September 1831 – 3 August 1914) was the bishop of the diocese of Cremona in the late years of the 19th century and first years of the 20th century. Bonomelli is still remembered for his work in support of Italian emigrants.

== Life ==
Born in Corte Franca in the time of the Kingdom of Lombardy–Venetia, he was ordained priest for his native diocese of Brescia in 1855. In 1871, Pope Pius IX named him bishop of Cremona.

From 1896 on, he was involved in the pastoral care of Italians that were living abroad, and many missions were founded for Italian emigration. For his work in this area, he was commemorated by Pope Pius XII in Exsul Familia (1952). The pope said that Bonomelli "founded an Agency for the Assistance of Italians who had migrated to other parts of Europe. From this Agency arose many institutions and flourishing centers of civic education and welfare. In 1900, devout priests and eminent laymen attracted to the work founded successful 'missions' in Switzerland, Austria, Germany and France".

Bonomelli was also a strong supporter of the involvement of Catholics (priests and laity) in the care of the poor, and he was involved in first attempts to solve the Roman Question. In 1889, one of his brochures was condemned by the Vatican, and so Bonomelli retracted it. Pope Leo XIII in turn thanked the bishop, saying that he had feared "those who [strove] to wrest [Bonomelli's] writings to support their own views" and insisted that the Pope's "civil princedom is not a question between man and man, but that the liberty of exercising [his] apostolic rights and duties is at stake, and this liberty ought not to be in the power and will of another".

Bonomelli died 3 August 1914.

Preceded by Antonio Novasconi	Bishop of Cremona; 1871 - 1914	Succeeded by Giovanni Cazzani
