= Giacomo de Suressi =

15th-century Roman Catholic bishop

Most Reverend Giacomo de Suressi
- Archbishop of Craina
- Church: Catholic Church
- Archdiocese: Archdiocese of Craina
- In office: 1482–1488

Orders
- Consecration: 13 Apr 1483 by Fabrizio Marliani

Personal details
- Born: Piacenza, Italy

Giacomo de Suressi or Giacomo Sulixio was a Roman Catholic prelate who served as Archbishop of Craina (1482–1488).

== Biography ==
Giacomo de Suressi was born in Piacenza, Italy. On 4 Sep 1482, he was appointed during the papacy of Pope Sixtus IV as Archbishop of Craina. On 13 Apr 1483, he was consecrated bishop by Fabrizio Marliani, Bishop of Piacenza, with Gabriel Abbiati, Titular Bishop of Berytus, and Jacopo-Antonio dalla Torre, Bishop of Cremona, serving as co-consecrators. He served as Archbishop of Craina until his resignation in 1488.

== External links and additional sources ==
- Cheney, David M. "Diocese of Craina". Catholic-Hierarchy.org. ^{[self-published]}
- Chow, Gabriel. "Titular Episcopal See of Craina (Albania)". GCatholic.org. ^{[self-published]}

Catholic Church titles
Preceded by	Archbishop of Craina; 1482–1488	Succeeded by
