= Pordenone (disambiguation) =

Pordenone may refer to:

- Pordenone, a comune in Italian Province of Pordenone
- Il Pordenone, Italian artist
- Pordenone Calcio S.S.D., Italian football club
- Odoric of Pordenone
