= Antonio Novasconi =

Italian politician

- Bishop of Cremona
- Church: Catholic Church
- Diocese: Diocese of Cremona
- In office: 20 May 1850 – 1867
- Predecessor: Bartolomeo Carlo Romilli
- Successor: Geremia Bonomelli

Orders
- Ordination: 7 October 1821
- Consecration: 30 June 1850 by Costantino Patrizi Naro

Personal details
- Born: 23 August 1798 Castiglione d'Adda, Department of Adda, Cisalpine Republic
- Died: 1867 (aged 68–69) Cremona, Province of Cremona, Kingdom of Italy

Styles of Antonio Novasconi
- Reference style: The Most Reverend
- Spoken style: Your Excellency
- Religious style: Monsignor
- Posthumous style: none

Antonio Novasconi (1798–1867) was an Italian prelate who became bishop of Cremona.

== Life ==
Novasconi was born in Castiglione d'Adda, part of the Cisalpine Republic. In 1810, he entered the minor seminary of Lodi and was ordained a priest in 1821. His first duty as priest was as a professor in the Lodi seminary, and in 1831 he was named pastor of the parish of Maleo and transferred to Lodi in 1838. After the failed revolution of 1848–1849, he begged for mercy for the Italian patriots sentenced to death by the Austrians. In 1850, Pope Pius IX named him bishop of Cremona; during his episcopacy, he was one of the few bishops who supported Italian Unification. During the Second Italian War of Independence, he wrote a letter to the priests in his diocese where he repeated his support for Italian Unification; this opinion was unpopular in Italian Catholic circles because Pope Pius IX supported the church's right to have a state. King Victor Emmanuel II named him a senator. He died in Cremona on 12 December 1867.

Catholic Church titles
| Preceded by Bartolomeo Carlo Romilli | Bishop of Cremona; 1850–1867 | Succeeded by Geremia Bonomelli |
