= Giacomo Antonio della Torre =

Italian Roman Catholic prelate

Most Reverend Giacomo Antonio della Torre
- Bishop of Cremona
- Church: Catholic Church
- In office: 1476–1486
- Predecessor: Giovanni Stefano Botticelli
- Successor: Ascanio Maria Sforza
- Previous posts: Bishop of Reggio Emilia (1439–1444); Bishop of Modena (1444–1463); Bishop of Parma (1463–1476)

Orders
- Consecration: 16 August 1439 by Antonio Bernieri (bishop)

Personal details
- Died: 1486 Cremona, Italy

Giacomo Antonio della Torre or Jacopo-Antonio dalla Torre (died 1486) was a Roman Catholic prelate who served as Bishop of Cremona (1476–1486), Bishop of Parma (1463–1476), Bishop of Modena (1444–1463), and Bishop of Reggio Emilia (1439–1444).

== Biography ==
Della Torre was born in the territory of Modena, and held a degree in the Arts, and was a Doctor of Medicine. Because of his intellectual gifts he was a favorite of Pope Eugene IV.

On 16 January 1439, Giacomo Antonio della Torre was appointed by Pope Eugene as Bishop of Reggio Emilia. On 16 August 1439, he was consecrated bishop by Antonio Bernieri (bishop), Bishop of Lodi, with Delfino della Pergola, Bishop of Parma, and Pier-Simone Brunetti, Auxiliary Bishop of Parma serving as co-consecrators.

On 19 October 1444, he was appointed Bishop of Modena by Pope Eugene.

On 24 September 1463, he was transferred to the diocese of Parma by Pope Pius II, at the same time as the Bishop of Parma, Delfino della Pergola, was transferred to Modena.

On 15 January 1476, Pope Sixtus IV transferred him to the diocese of Cremona. He served as Bishop of Cremona until his death in 1486.

While bishop, he was the principal co-consecrator of Giacomo de Suressi (Sulixio), Archbishop of Craina (1483).

== Sources and external links ==
- Allodi, Giovanni Maria (1856). Serie cronologica dei vescovi di Parma con alcuni cenni sui principali avvenimenti civili (in Italian). Vol. I. Parma: P. Fiaccadori. pp. 767–789.
- Di Zio, Tiziana. "DELLA TORRE, Giacomo Antonio" Dizionario Biografico degli Italiani Volume 37 (1989); retrieved: 13 October 2018. (in Italian)
- Eubel, Konrad (1914). Hierarchia catholica medii et recentioris aevi. Vol. II (second ed.). Münster: Libreria Regensbergiana. (in Latin)

Catholic Church titles
Preceded by Tebaldo da Sesso	Bishop of Reggio Emilia; 1439–1444	Succeeded by Battista Pallavicino
Preceded by Scipione Manenti	Bishop of Modena; 1444–1463	Succeeded by Delfino della Pergola
Preceded by Delfino della Pergola	Bishop of Parma; 1463–1476	Succeeded by Sagramoro Sagramori
Preceded by Giovanni Stefano Botticelli	Bishop of Cremona; 1476–1486	Succeeded by Ascanio Maria Sforza
