= Lorenzo Roverella =

Catholic bishop

Most Reverend Lorenzo Roverella
- Bishop of Ferrara
- Church: Catholic Church
- Diocese: Diocese of Ferrara
- In office: 1460–1474
- Predecessor: Francesco de Lignamine
- Successor: Bartolomeo della Rovere

Personal details
- Died: 1474

Lorenzo Roverella (died 1474) was a Roman Catholic prelate who served as Bishop of Ferrara (1460–1474).

== Biography ==
On 26 March 1460, Lorenzo Roverella was appointed during the papacy of Pope Pius II as Bishop of Ferrara. He served as Bishop of Ferrara until his death in 1474.

While bishop, he was the principal co-consecrator of Giovanni Stefano Botticelli, Bishop of Cremona.

Rovarella was a referendary in the Roman Curia when Pope Paul II named him to proclaim an indulgence for the crusade against the Hussite king of Bohemia, George Podiebrad in 1468.

== External links and additional sources ==
- Cheney, David M. "Archdiocese of Ferrara-Comacchio". Catholic-Hierarchy.org. (for Chronology of Bishops) ^{[self-published]}
- Chow, Gabriel. "Archdiocese of Ferrara–Comacchio (Italy)". GCatholic.org. (for Chronology of Bishops) ^{[self-published]}

Catholic Church titles
Preceded by Francesco de Lignamine	Bishop of Ferrara; 1460–1474	Succeeded by Bartolomeo della Rovere
