= Himerius of Cremona =

Saint Himerius of Cremona
- Died: c. 560
- Venerated in: Roman Catholic Church
- Feast: June 17
- Patronage: Cremona

Himerius (Imier, Imerio) of Cremona (d. June 17, c. 560), also known as Himerius of Amelia or Irnerius, was an Italian bishop. He is venerated as a saint by the Roman Catholic Church and Christian communities of Western Rite Orthodoxy.

== Life ==
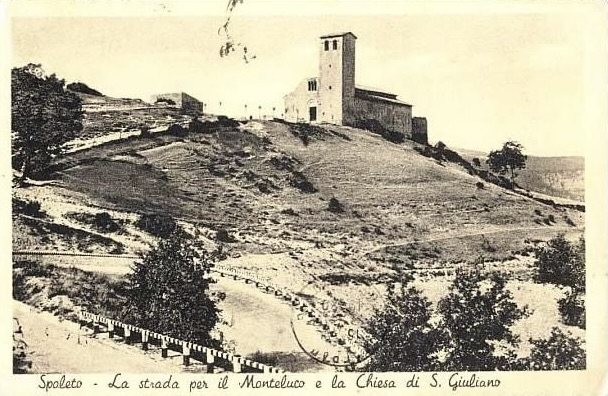
Abbazia di San Giuliano, Monteluco di Spoleto

A native of Calabria, Himerius was a hermit. He then became a monk, probably in the monastery of San Giuliano in Monteluco near Spoleto or in the monastery of San Pietro in Valle in the Valnerina Valley near Terni before being elected bishop of Amelia. He is described as having been an extremely austere, ascetic person.

== Veneration ==
Himerius' name does not appear in the ancient martyrologies. However, his name appears in the Roman Martyrology.

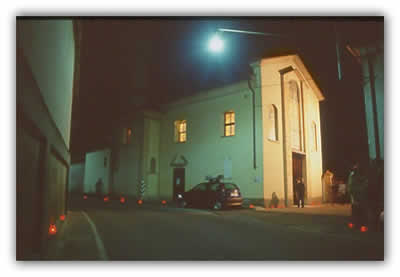
The parish church of Sant'Imerio (Madignano)

An abbot named Ambrose (Ambrogio), who lived around the twelfth century, wrote a Vita of Himerius, but only its prologue remains. A later bishop of Amelia, Antonio Maria Graziani (1592–1611), also wrote a biography of the saint.

Around 965, Himerius' relics were moved from Amelia to Cremona by Liutprand (Liutprando, Luizo), bishop of Cremona from 962 to 972. They were interred in a church that was later destroyed in the earthquake of 1117. Rediscovered in 1129, they were placed in a sepulcher. Miracles were reported at his tomb. A monk named John (Giovanni) wrote, in the 12th century, a collection of miracles performed by the saint after this rediscovery of the relics. This was composed during the episcopate of the Cremonese bishop Offredo (1168–1185).

In 1196, Sicardo, another bishop of Cremona, placed the relics of Himerius in an archway of stone along with those of a martyr named Archelaus (Archelao) and consecrated an altar in their honor.

There is a relief of "Bishop Himerius distributing alms" by Giovanni Antonio Amadeo in the presbytery of Cremona Cathedral at the entrance on the right.

The monastery of Sant'Imerio was built in Cremona in 1606 to house members of the Order of the Discalced Carmelites.

== See also ==
- Western Rite Orthodoxy
- St. Fructus (Frutos)
