= Annunziata, Cortemaggiore =

Church building in Cortemaggiore, Italy

Coordinates: 44.99590°N 9.93690°E

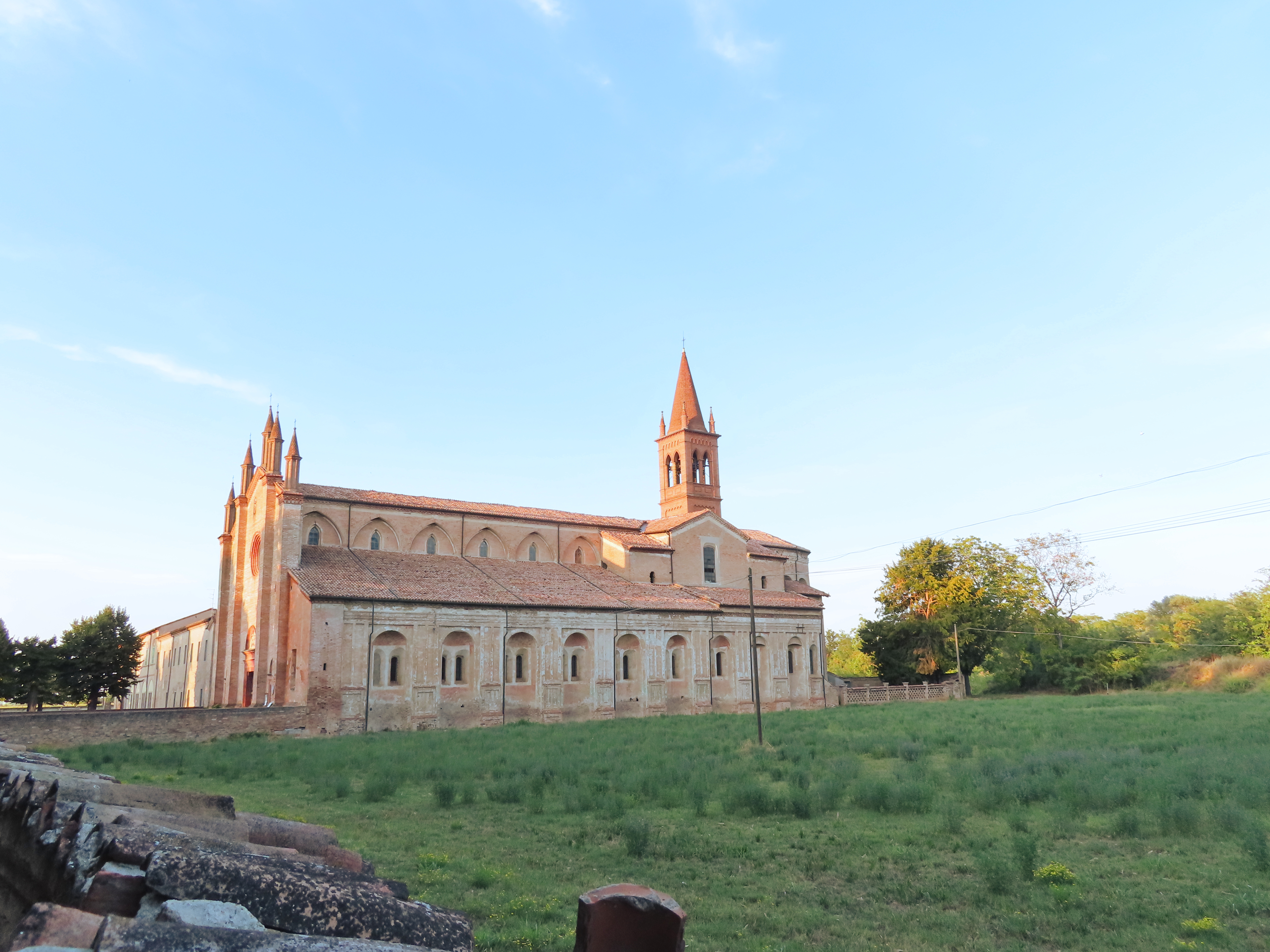
View of the church and monastery buildings from the south

The Chiesa dell'Annunziata is a late-Gothic style, Roman Catholic church just outside of Cortemaggiore, in the Province of Piacenza, region of Emilia-Romagna, Italy. The church is dedicated to Virgin Mary of the Annunciation.

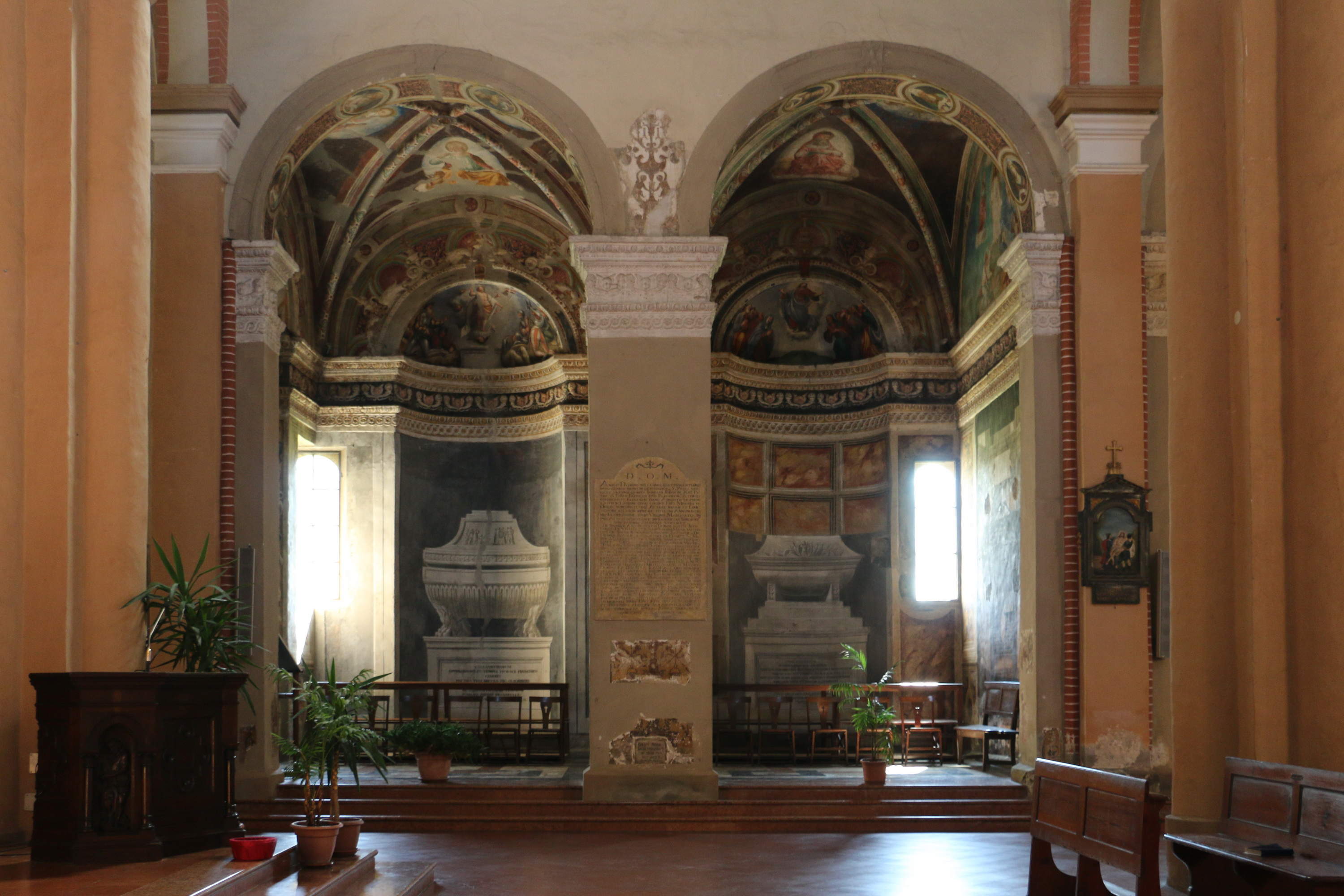
Capella Pallavicino

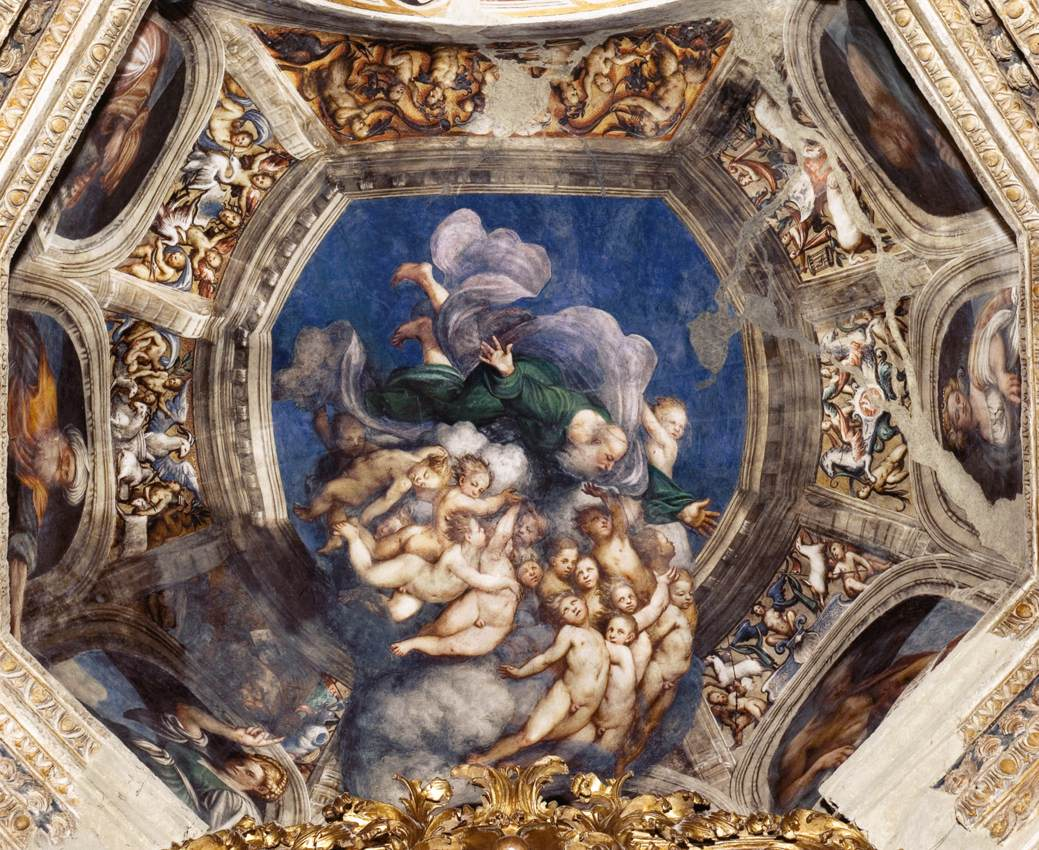
Dome of the Capella with fresco depicting God the Father and Angels by Pordenone.

The church and the adjacent Franciscan order convent were begun in 1487 and the site consecrated in 1492. By 1492, twenty Franciscan monks had begun living at the convent. The church has a layout with a central nave and two aisles. The nave was frescoed by Bernardo Zenale. Inside is the octagonal Chapel of the Pallavicino family. The burial relics were transferred in 1812 to a mausoleum in the Collegiata in the town. However, the painter Giovanni Antonio de Sacchis known as il Pordenone, was employed in 1529–1530 to fresco walls of the chapel. Pordenone also painted an altarpiece for the chapel, but this was moved by the Farnese to Naples, and the original is on display in the Capodimonte.

Adjacent to the church is the former Franciscan convent. This was suppressed in 1805. In 1870, it was restored to the church and hosted a group of Padri Sacramentini, as well as a school and town library.

On 29 August 2023 it was announced that the church would close for services due to the lack of Franciscan priests to accommodate services. The regional undersecretary of Culture plans to find a way to open the site to visitors.

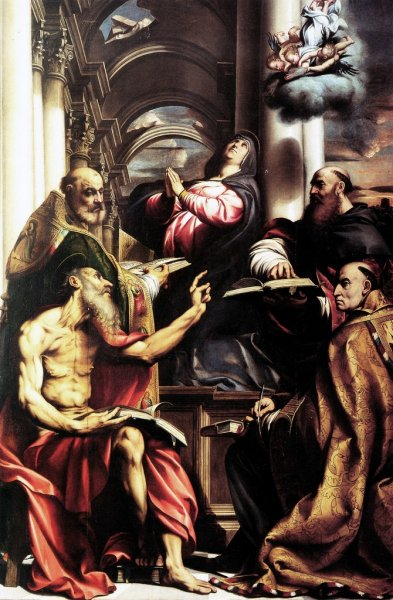
Dispute over the Immaculate Conception of Mary by Pordenone, now at the Capodimonte
