= Giovanni Cazzani =

20th-century Italian Catholic archbishop and bishop

Archbishop Giovanni Cazzani Servant of God
- Bishop of Cremona
- Church: Roman Catholic Church
- Diocese: Cremona
- See: Cremona
- Installed: 11 April 1915
- Term ended: 26 August 1952
- Predecessor: Geremia Bonomelli
- Successor: Danio Bolognini
- Previous post: Bishop of Cesena (1904–1915)

Orders
- Ordination: 1 November 1889
- Consecration: 28 August 1904 by Francesco Ciceri
- Rank: Archbishop

Personal details
- Born: Giovanni Cazzani; 4 March 1867 Samperone, Pavia, Kingdom of Italy
- Died: 26 August 1952 (aged 85) Cremona, Italy
- Motto: Non est prudentia nisi a Domino ("There is no understanding but from the Lord")

Giovanni Cazzani (4 March 1867 – 26 August 1952) was an Italian archbishop of the Roman Catholic Church who served as the head of the Diocese of Cremona; he was granted the title of archbishop in 1944 despite leading a diocese. He had led the Diocese of Cesena prior to his elevation to his new see.

Cazzani was hailed as one of the most distinguished to lead the diocese of Cremona for his deep piousness and his vast culture.

Cazzani's cause of sainthood commenced on 2 April 2015 thus granting him the posthumous title Servant of God.

== Life ==
Cazzani was born in Pavia on 4 March 1867 to Vincenzo Cazzani and Amalia Trovati. He had seven siblings and was left motherless at the age of twelve.

Cazzani commenced his studies for the priesthood and was ordained at the age of 22 on 1 November 1889. Following this he was assigned to teach seminarians and at the college of Saint Augustine. He continued his own studies and graduated with honors in philosophical studies in 1892 and then with the completion of his theological studies in 1893 in Milan. He also served as the private assistant to the Archbishop of Ravenna in 1901 until the latter's death in 1902.

Pope Pius X appointed him as the Bishop of Cesena on 5 August 1904. He was installed in his new diocese in 1904 and received his episcopal consecration as a result of his elevation. He was also an acquainted with the Archbishop of Bologna Cardinal Giacomo della Chiesa who became Pope Benedict XV in 1914 and appointed him as the Bishop of Cremona in 1914 during the onslaught of World War I which he was opposed to.

Pope Pius XII granted him the title of archbishop in 1944 "ad personam". As a bishop he published 38 pastoral letters and completed a total of six pastoral visits to all parishes across his diocese.

Cazzani died on 26 August 1952.

== Beatification process ==
Cazzani gained a reputation as a pious and innovative leader who paid strict attention to the needs of the faithful. The beatification process commenced under Pope Francis on 2 April 2015. He has been granted the title Servant of God.
