= Giovanni Stefano Botticelli =

Roman Catholic Bishop of Cremona (died 1472)

Most Reverend Giovanni Stefano Botticelli
- Bishop of Cremona
- Church: Catholic Church
- In office: 1466–1472
- Predecessor: Bernardus de Rubeis
- Successor: Jacopo-Antonio dalla Torre

Orders
- Consecration: 18 January 1467 by Giacomo Ammannati-Piccolomini

Personal details
- Died: 1472

Giovanni Stefano Botticelli (died 1472) was a Roman Catholic prelate who served as Bishop of Cremona (1466–1472).

== Biography ==
On 8 October 1466, Giovanni Stefano Botticelli was appointed Bishop of Cremona by Pope Paul II. On 18 January 1467, he was consecrated bishop by Giacomo Ammannati-Piccolomini, Bishop of Pavia, with Domenico de Dominicis, Bishop of Brescia, and Lorenzo Roverella, Bishop of Ferrara, serving as co-consecrators. He served as Bishop of Cremona until his death in 1472.

== External links and additional sources ==
Catholic Church titles
Preceded by Bernardus de Rubeis	Bishop of Cremona; 1466–1472	Succeeded by Jacopo-Antonio dalla Torre
