= Cremona Baptistery =

Religious edifice in Cremona, northern Italy

Coordinates: 45°7′59.21″N 10°1′30.26″E

The Cremona Baptistery (Italian: Battistero di Cremona) is a religious edifice in Cremona, northern Italy. It is an annex to the Cremona Cathedral, reflecting the early Christian practice that the unbaptized were not permitted to enter the consecrated main church. The water basin in the center of the building is not itself a baptismal font, but a storage location for holy water for baptisms.

Built in 1167, it has an octagonal plan. 16th century restorations include the marble cover of some walls, the pavement and the baptismal font (1531) and the narthex (1588) of the entrance.

The interior has a 14th-century crucifix over the St. John altar, and two wooden statues of saints, Philip Neri and John the Baptist. Over the ceiling is a 12th-century statue of the Archangel Gabriel.

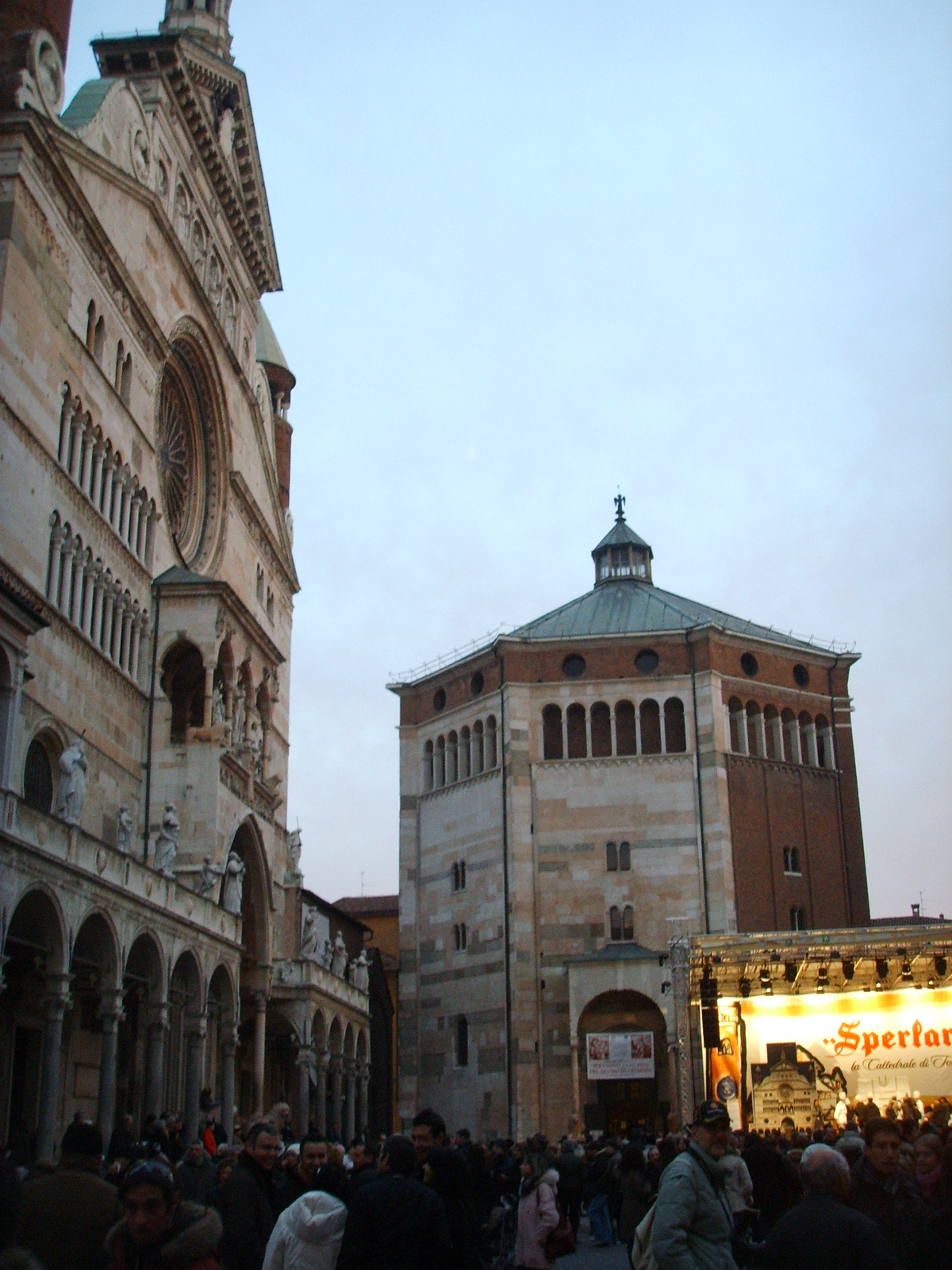
The baptistery; on the left side, the cathedral

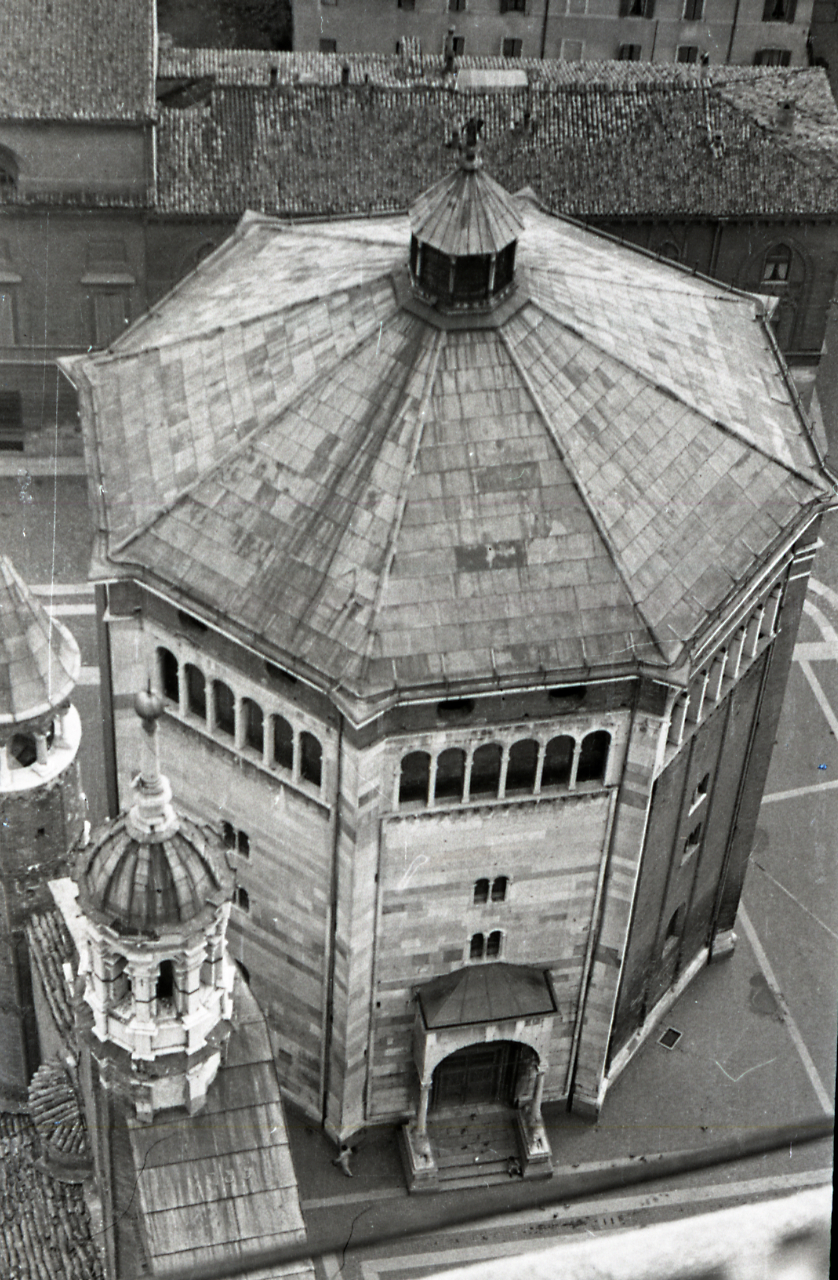
Photo by Paolo Monti
