= Danaë (Annibale Carracci) =

Destroyed painting by Annibale Carracci

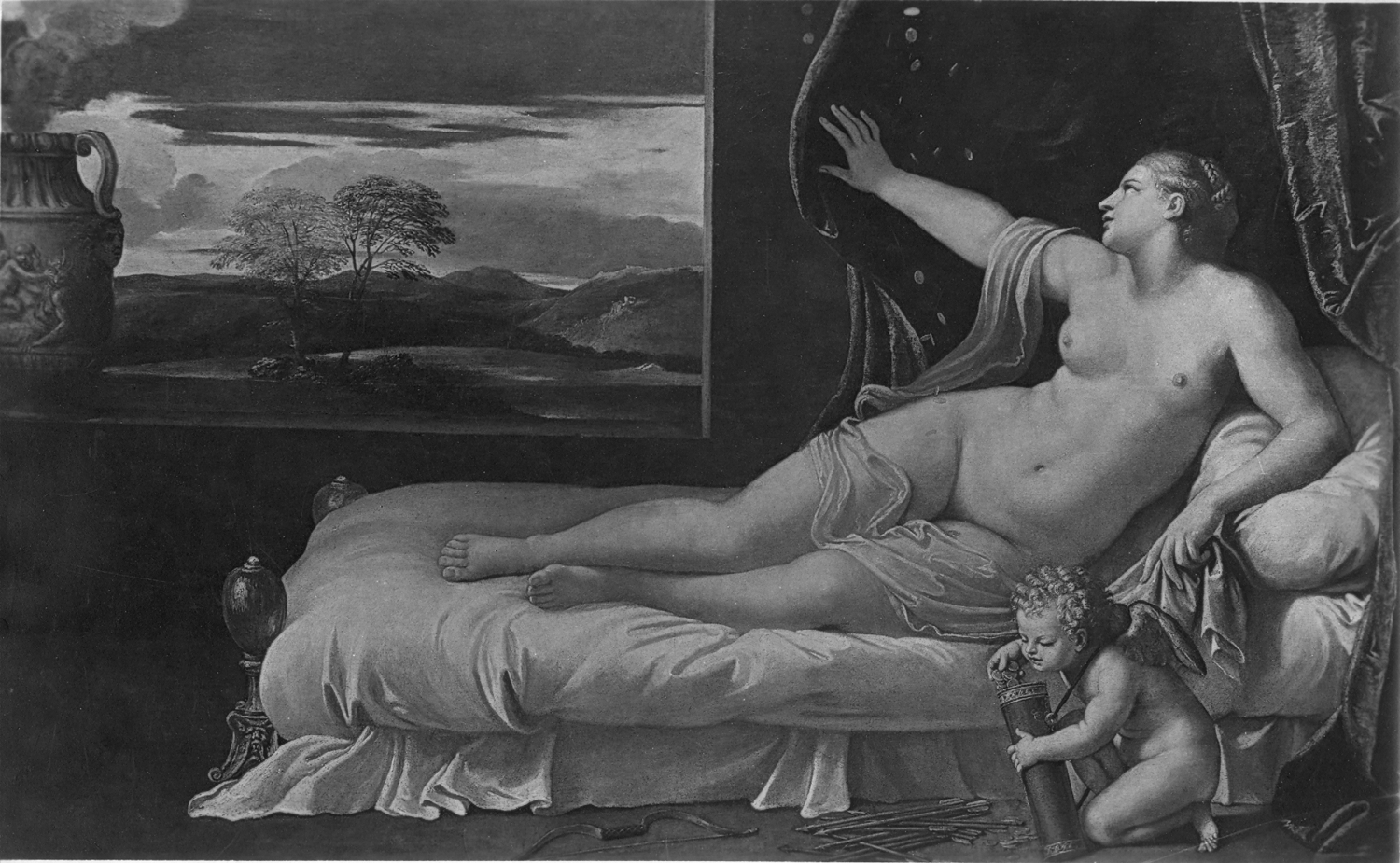
Danaë (ca. 1600–1605) by Annibale Carracci

Danaë was an oil-on-canvas painting by the Italian Baroque painter Annibale Carraci, created ca. 1600–1605 and destroyed during World War II. An autograph preparatory study survives in the Royal Collection at Windsor Castle.

Its attribution is widely accepted by art historians but has been doubted by Hans Tietze (1880–1954) and Donald Posner (1931–2005), with the former proposing Domenichino and the latter Francesco Albani.

The earliest reference to the work is a 1652 inventory of the Pamphili family collection. According to Giovanni Pietro Bellori's 1672 Vite de' pittori, scultori e architetti moderni and Scannelli's 1657 Il microcosmo della pittura, Christina of Sweden admired the work on a visit to Camillo Francesco Maria Pamphili's collections and in 1652 he gave it to her. It was then owned by the Odescalchi, but when that collection was split up it became part of the Orléans collection at the Palais Royal in Paris.

Like much of the Orléans Collection it was acquired by an English collector and later entered Bridgewater House in London, where it and other Carracci works such as Lamentation were destroyed by bombing in 1941.

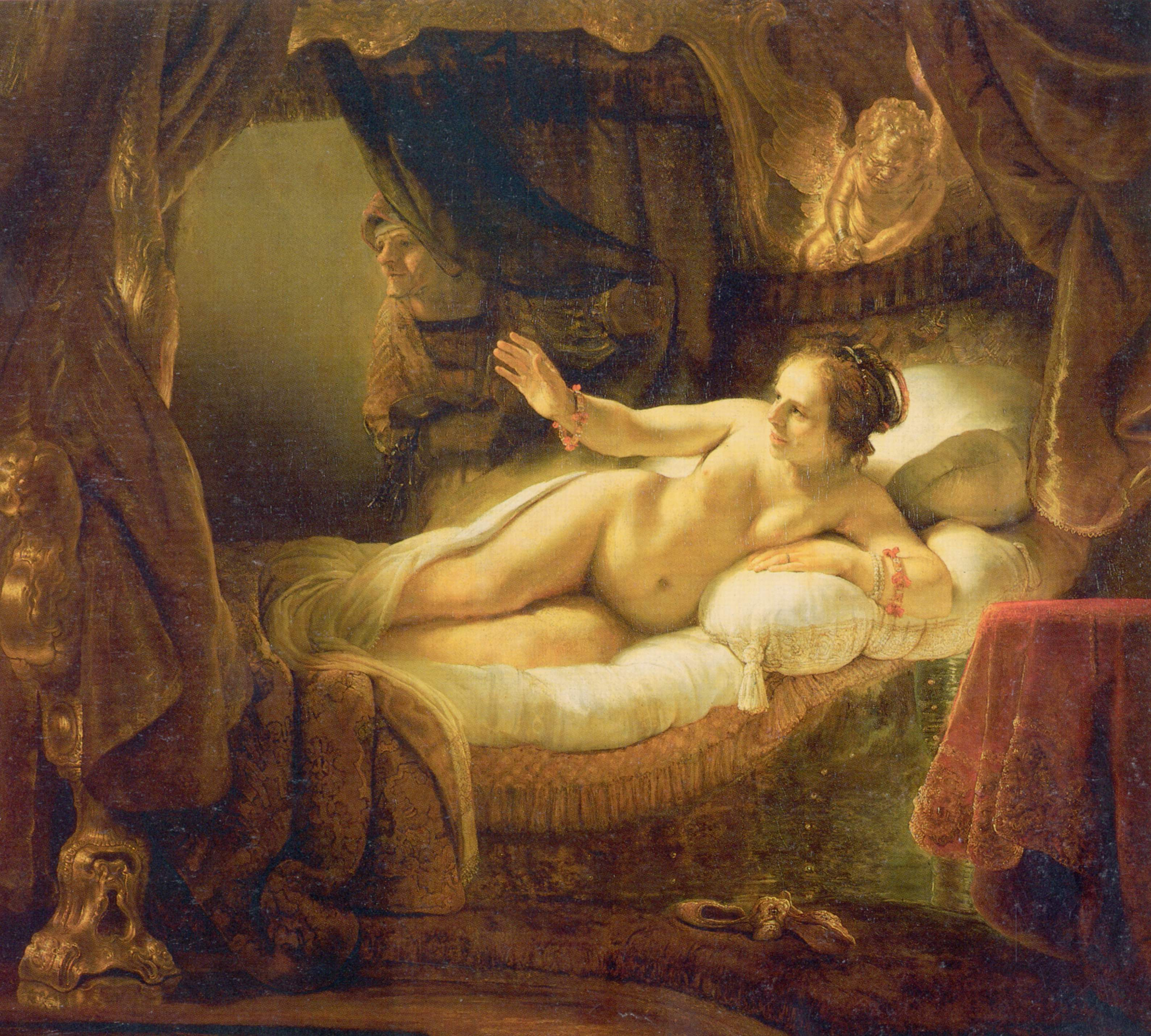
Rembrandt, Danae, 1636, Hermitage Museum, St Petersburg

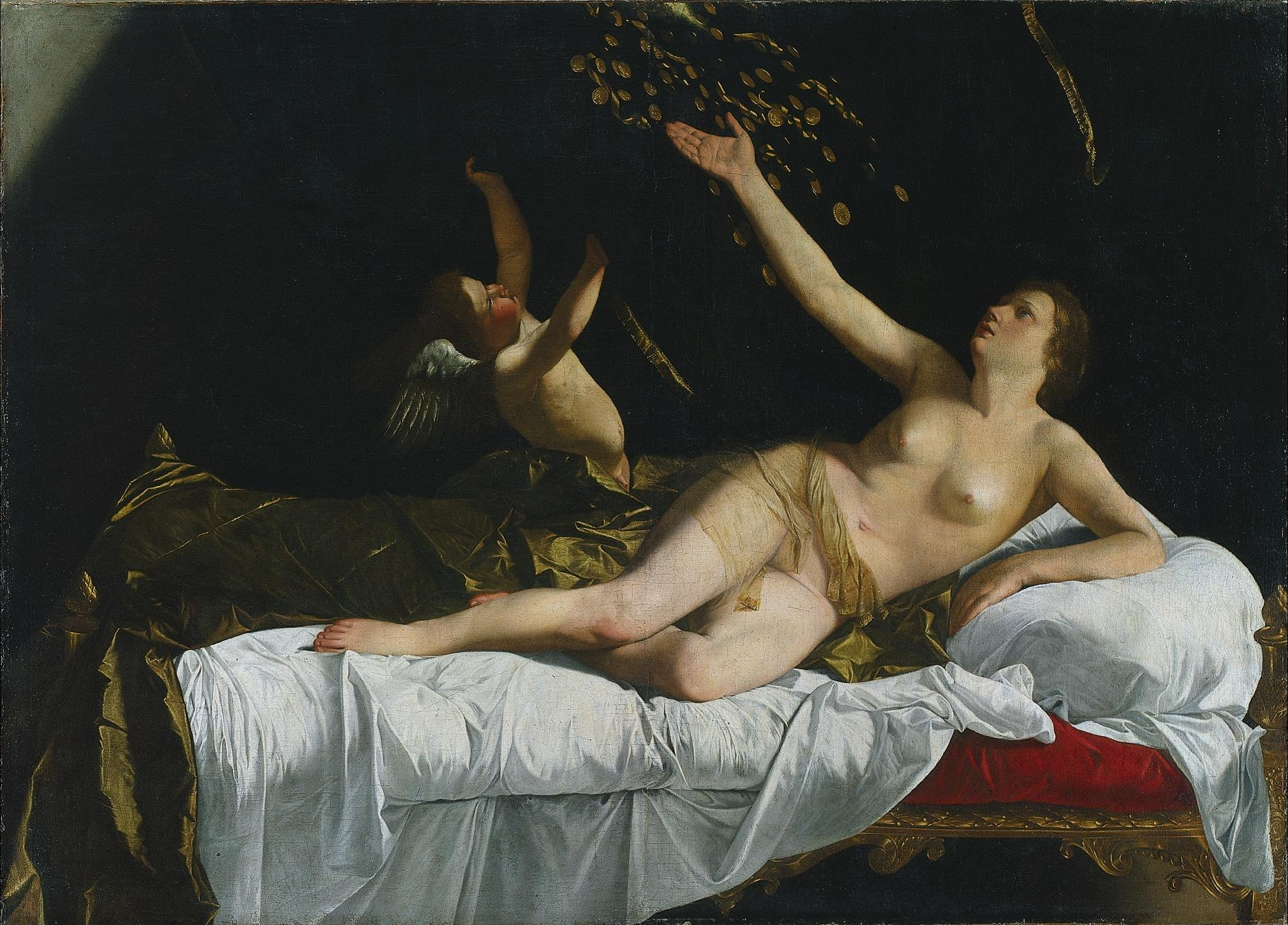
Orazio Gentileschi, Danae, 1623, Cleveland Museum of Art, Cleveland

Prints but no painted copies of it were known until 2011 when a painting from a Moscow private collection was shown at the exhibition "15-18th century Italian paintings from private collections in Moscow" (Central House of painters) as a workshop copy. Victoria Markova in her 2024 book suggests that the copy was made by Annibale's nephew Antonio Carracci.

The composition was a major influence on later treatments of the subject, such as those by Orazio Gentileschi and Rembrandt.

== Description ==
The episode depicted is related to the myth of Danae, daughter of the king of Argos Acrisius, who had been locked in a bronze tower by her father so that she would not have carnal contact with any man. In fact, the king of Argos had been told that his daughter Danae's son would cause his death. Jupiter however fell in love with the beautiful prisoner and, taking the form of a golden rain, mated with Danae, impregnating her. From this union was born Perseus who then fulfilled the oracle's prediction, causing the death of Acrisius.

In Annibale's canvas, Danae opens the curtain of her bed to receive Jupiter, transformed into a shower of gold coins. Cupid on the ground uses the quiver – from which he has removed the arrows – to fill it with the gold coins that fall from above, a detail that – according to Scannelli's interpretation – perhaps symbolizes how even things of love can be conditioned by money and wealth.

Cupid also appears in the relief of the vase (on the left of the composition) while he subdues Pan, a probable allusion to the theme of Omnia vincit amor (pan in Greek means everything). The same scene was depicted by Annibale in one of the monochrome medallions of the vault of the Farnese Gallery. A large window on the left opens onto a vast landscape.

Both Scannelli and Bellori praise the painting without reservations: for the former "the figure of Danae is very beautiful", for the latter it is "a work such that from every point of observation expressed with extreme beauty it appears among the most worthy and continually admirable".
