= Delfino della Pergola =

Roman Catholic bishop (1398–1465)

Most Reverend Delfino della Pergola
- Bishop of Modena
- Church: Catholic Church
- Diocese: Diocese of Modena
- In office: 1463–1465
- Predecessor: Jacopo-Antonio dalla Torre
- Successor: Nicolò Sandonnini
- Previous post: Bishop of Parma (1425–1463)

Orders
- Consecration: 18 Sep 1426 by Pietro Grassi

Personal details
- Born: 1398
- Died: 1465 (age 67)

Delfino della Pergola (1398–1465) was a Roman Catholic prelate who served as Bishop of Modena (1463–1465) and Bishop of Parma (1425–1463).

== Biography ==
Delfino della Pergola was born in 1398. On 24 Aug 1425, he was appointed during the papacy of Pope Martin V as Bishop of Parma. On 18 Sep 1426, he was consecrated bishop by Pietro Grassi, Bishop of Pavia. On 24 Sep 1463, he was appointed during the papacy of Pope Pius II as Bishop of Modena. He served as Bishop of Modena until his death in 1465.

While bishop, he was the principal co-consecrator of Jacopo-Antonio dalla Torre, Bishop of Reggio Emilia (1439); and Carlo Gabriele Sforza, Archbishop of Milan (1454).

== External links and additional sources ==
- Cheney, David M. "Diocese of Parma (-Fontevivo)". Catholic-Hierarchy.org. (for Chronology of Bishops) ^{[self-published]}
- Chow, Gabriel. "Diocese of Parma (Italy)". GCatholic.org. (for Chronology of Bishops) ^{[self-published]}
- Cheney, David M. "Archdiocese of Modena-Nonantola". Catholic-Hierarchy.org. (for Chronology of Bishops) ^{[self-published]}
- Chow, Gabriel. "Metropolitan Archdiocese of Modena–Nonantola (Italy)". GCatholic.org. (for Chronology of Bishops) ^{[self-published]}

Catholic Church titles
Preceded by Bernardo Zambernelli	Bishop of Parma; 1425–1463	Succeeded by Jacopo-Antonio dalla Torre
Preceded by Jacopo-Antonio dalla Torre	Bishop of Modena; 1463–1465	Succeeded by Nicolò Sandonnini
