= Bertolino Bragerio =

Italian architect

Bertolino Bragerio (active in 1288) was an Italian architect of the medieval period, active in Cremona. Along with Jacopo Camperio, he is crediting with erection of the Cathedral of Cremona.
