= Simon of Cremona =

Simon of Cremona (d. in Padua, 1390) was a writer and well-known preacher of the Augustinian Order. He worked during the late fourteenth century in Northern Italy, especially in Venice.

== Works ==
Excerpts from his sermons were published under the title of Postilla super Evangliis et Epistolis Omnium Dominicarum. These excerpts include:

- In Quatuor Libros Sententiarum
- Quaestiones de indulgentia Portiunculaee
- Quaestiones de sanguine Christi
