= Cremona Cathedral =

Roman Catholic Cathedral in Cremona, Italy

Coordinates: 45.1335°N 10.0255°E

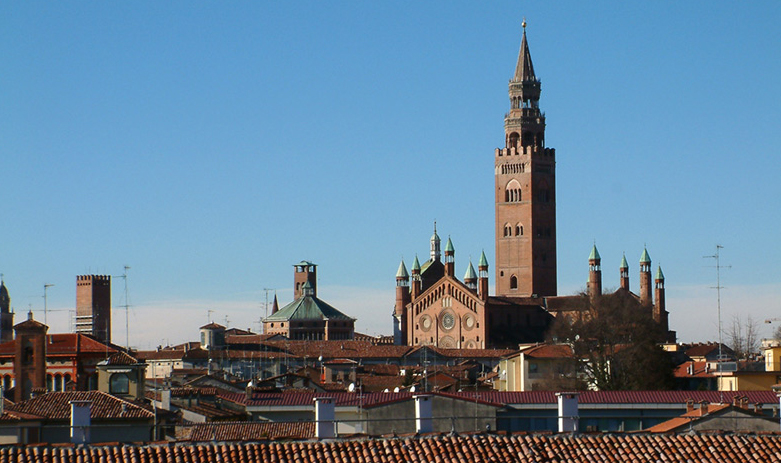
External view of the cathedral

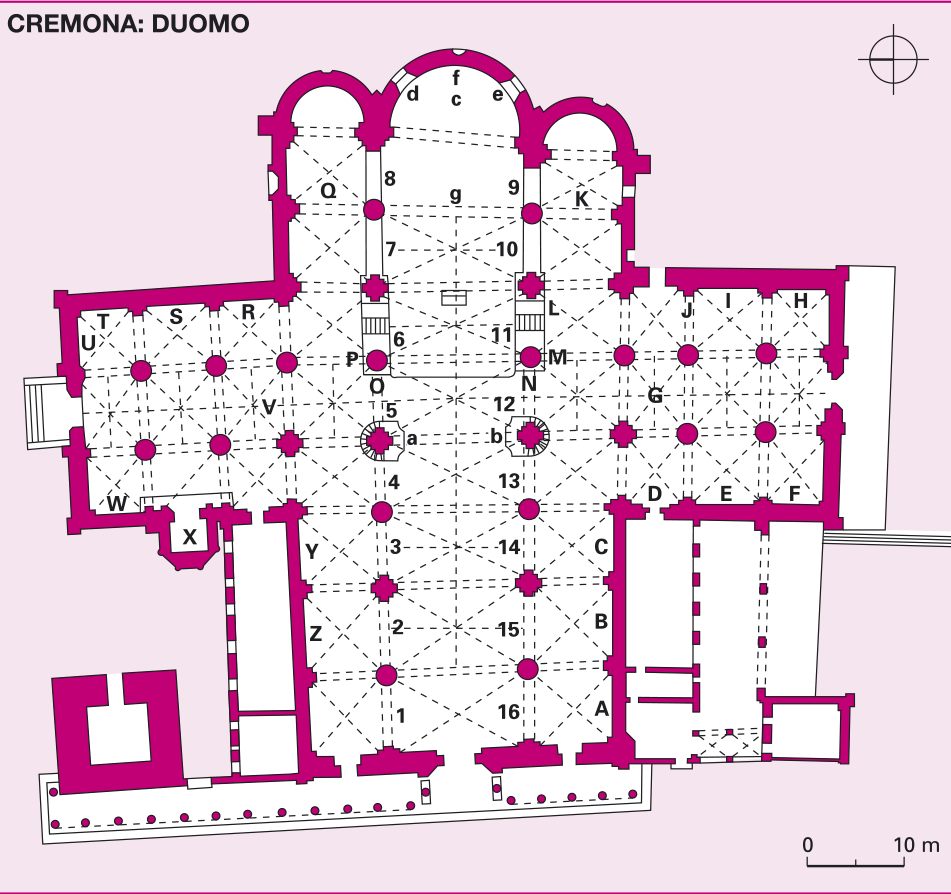
Map of the cathedral

Cremona Cathedral (Italian: Duomo di Cremona, Cattedrale di Santa Maria Assunta), dedicated to the Assumption of the Blessed Virgin Mary, is a Catholic cathedral in Cremona, Lombardy, northern Italy. It is the seat of the Bishop of Cremona. Its bell tower is the famous Torrazzo, symbol of the city and tallest pre-modern tower in Italy.

Also adjoining is the baptistery, another important medieval monument.

== History ==
Originally built in Romanesque style, the cathedral has been restored and extended several times, with Gothic, Renaissance and Baroque elements. Construction began in 1107, but the works were damaged and halted after an earthquake in 1117. Construction resumed in 1129, and the building was probably finished in 1160–1170. The main altar, dedicated to the city's patron saints Archelaus and Himerius, was consecrated in 1196.

The current façade was probably built in the 13th and the early 14th century. In the same period the arms of the transept were also added: the northern in 1288 and the southern in 1348.

== Exterior ==
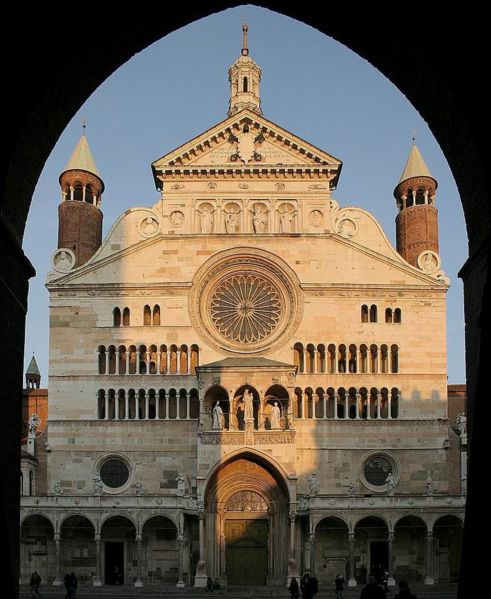
Façade

The main façade, together with the adjoining baptistery, is one of the most important monuments of Romanesque art in Europe. It has a portico with a narthex in the middle, to which a Renaissance loggia with three niches was added in 1491. This is surmounted by a large rose window, flanked by two orders of loggette ("small loggias").

The portal is probably from the early 12th century. On its side are the figures of the Four Major Prophets, each bearing a roll with the text of their prophecies. The narthex was made by masters from Campione in the following century: it incorporates an older frieze portraying the Labours of the Months (late 12th century, inspired by that in the Baptistery of Parma). The four statues on the upper loggia, portraying the Madonna with Child and two bishops, are of the Tuscan school (1310). The columns of the narthex stand on two lions in Verona marble. The left one is holding a dragon, symbol of Evil, in his paws, while the right one is holding a bear, which in turn is biting a bird's neck.

On the façade are also two tombs: the more recent one (mid-14th century) is by Bonino da Campione.

The façade of the northern arm of the transept (late 13th century) also has a narthex; and its columns also have two lions at the base. It is characterized by a sequence of mullioned windows and rose windows. The façade of the southern arm of the transept dates from 1342, and is in brickwork, as is typical in Lombard Gothic architecture. Its structure is similar to the northern arm, but has slightly more detailed decoration.

The three apses are all surmounted by loggias with small columns, each having a human face stretching out from the capital. The central apse is much higher than the flanking ones.

== Interior ==
The interior houses important works of art.

The oldest are the frescoes of the Stories of Abraham, Isaac, Jacob and Joseph in the southern and northern transept vaults (late 14th-early 15th century). Also from the Renaissance are the arch of the Stories of the Martyrs Marius and Marta, Audifax and Habakkuk, martyrs in Persia (best known as Arch of the Persian Martyrs, 1482), and the relief of Saint Himerius (1481–1484), both works by Giovanni Antonio Amadeo. Also notable is the urn of Saints Marcellinus and Peter, sculpted mostly by Benedetto Briosco (1506–1513), in the crypt.

The wooden choir, with inlay work by Platina (1482–1490), and the contemporary large altar cross in silver and gold, by Ambrogio Pozzi and Agostino Sacchi (1478), in the right aisle of the northern transept, are also notable.

The most important figurative complex of the cathedral is the fresco decoration on the side walls of the nave (early 16th century), portraying the Life of Mary and Christ. Different painters collaborated to its execution: the first was Boccaccio Boccaccino (with Annunciation to Joachim and Jesus with the Doctors), who, in 1506, had already painted a Redemeer with Cremona's Patron Saints in the apse vault. He was succeeded by Giovan Francesco Bembo (Epiphany and Presentation at the Temple) and Altobello Melone (Flight to Egypt, Massacre of the Innocents and the first four panels of the Passion of Christ), who both adopted a less classicist style. Next came Girolamo Romanino, author of the scenes from Jesus before Pilatus to Ecce Homo, who painted some of his masterworks here.

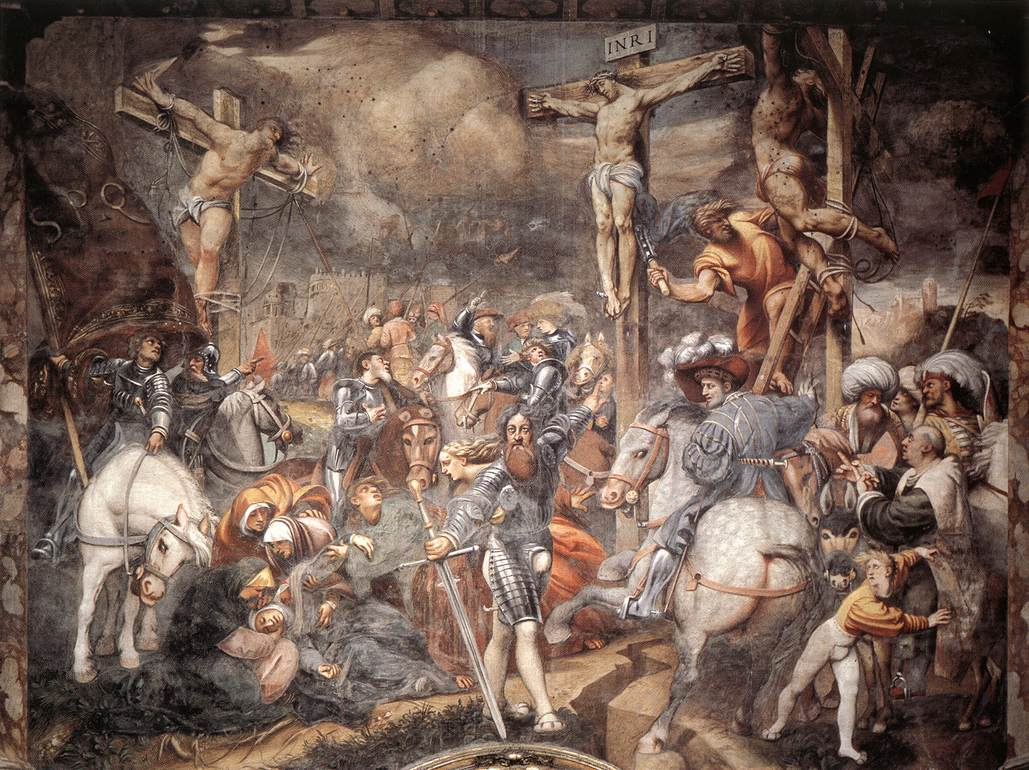
The Crucifixion by Il Pordenone, in the counter-façade

The last scenes of the Passion were executed by Il Pordenone, who was also responsible of the large Crucifixion (1521), the Deposition (1521, counterfaçade) and the Schizzi Altarpiece (before 1523, on the first altar in the right aisles), the latter inspired by Giorgione's style. The complex was completed by Bernardino Gatti with the Resurrection (1529).

Other frescoes were added in the mid-16th century by Mannerist painters, including Gatti himself, Bernardino Campi and others. In the 17th century Il Genovesino added the Life of St. Roch in the northern transept.

== See also ==
- Bertolino Bragerio
