= Roman Catholic Archdiocese of Craina =

Former Roman Catholic diocese in Albania

The Diocese of Craina (Latin: Dioecesis Craynensis) was a Roman Catholic diocese located in Craina, Albania (modern day Skadarska Krajina). In 1921, it was restored as a Titular Episcopal See.

== Ordinaries ==
- Sabbas (1452-1454), first bishop and Uniate Greek
- Pal Dushmani (1454-1457 Died), second bishop
- John (1457-), Uniate Greek

sede vacante

- André Zamonetic, O.P. (1476-1482)
- Giacomo de Suressi (Sulixio) (1482-1488 Resigned)
- Francesco Quirini, (1495-1499 Appointed, Archbishop of Durrës)

== See also ==
- Catholic Church in Albania

== Bibliography ==
- Farlati, Daniele; Coleti, Jacopo (1817). Illyrcum sacrum (in Latin). pp. 436–448.
