= Sicard of Cremona =

Italian prelate, historian and writer

Sicardus of Cremona (Latin: Sicardus Cremonensis; Italian: Sicardo) (1155–1215) was an Italian prelate, historian and writer.

== Biography ==
Sicardus was born in Cremona, probably to the Casalaschi family, and probably in the 1150s. His brother Bocardus is sometimes called Bocardus Casalascus.

He studied law in Bologna and Mainz, though he could not take a degree from Mainz since the university had not yet been founded or received a charter.

Sicardus himself records in his Cronica that he received minor holy orders in 1179 from Bishop Offredus of Cremona (1168–1185).

In 1180, while living in Mainz, he composed the Summa canonum.

He returned to Cremona. He was ordained a subdeacon by Pope Lucius III in 1183, and was sent to the emperor Frederic Barbarossa, to arrange a meeting between the emperor and the pope.

Bishop Offredus died on 9 August 1185, and Sicardus was elected bishop of Cremona, before 23 August 1185, when he signed an agreement with the Canons of the cathedral. At the same time, the Emperor rebuilt and fortified the city of Crema, and laid the city of Cremona under the imperial ban.

Early in 1188, Sicard made the journey to Germany, to beg the Emperor Frederick to allow the Cremonans to rebuild Castromanfredi. The emperor refused. Therefore, on April 18, 1188, Bishop Sicard laid the first stone of a new castle to defend Cremona. This was an outpost in the northwest, toward Crema, the Castrum Leonis, today Castelleone. Sicard and the people also built a transport ship, intended to carry supplies to the troops fighting in the Holy Land. In the same year, he fell afoul of the papacy. He had torn down and carried away the stones of a chapel on allodial land belonging to the convent of nuns at S. Julia in Brescia. Two cardinal legates, Soffredus and Petrus, ordered a trial. The bishop apparently lost, since Pope Clement III, who had refused appeals, appointed two commissioners on 30 March 1190 to conclude the business even in the face of further delaying tactics.

On 19 January 1191, Bishop Sicardus was at Lodi, where he met King Henry, Barbarossa's son, who was going to Rome for his coronation. In 1193, in a reply to an inquiry from Bishop Sicardus, Pope Celestine III assured Sicardus that he had the right to judge suits of clerics, without appeal, provided that the sum involved was less than 40 solidi, and provided that the bishop had no personal interest in the suit.

On 4 June 1196, Pope Celestine III issued a mandate to Bishop Sicardus, to intervene against the neighbors and patrons of the church of Santa Croce in Cremona, which belonged de jure to the monastery of Nonantola; they had detained the prior and chaplain unlawfully, and should be warned to return the church to the Abbot and monastery of Nonantola and to make restitution for the vineyard belonging to the church which they had plundered. The bishop was in Pavia on 26 August 1196, where he subscribed a charter of Henry VI. Henry died on 28 September 1197, and Pope Celestine on 8 January 1198. In northern Italy, one petty war after another disturbed the political and ecclesiastical scene, Milan and Cremona struggling again over Crema, while in Germany there were two contenders for the imperial crown, Otto of Brunswick and Philip of Swabia. Innocent III was elected pope on 8 January 1198.

In 1203, he followed the papal legate Cardinal Peter of Capua to the East during the Fourth Crusade. As they were returning in 1204, by way of Constantinople, to make a report on operations in the east, Sicardus conducted ordinations in Hagia Sophia on the legate's invitation, on 18 December 1204. How long he remained in Constantinople is not known, but the Legate, Cardinal Peter, received an angry letter from Pope Innocent III, dated 17 February 1205, berating him for leaving his post in the Holy Land.

Sicardus had certainly returned to Cremona by 16 December 1205, when he received the rights of patronage over the church of All Saints in Cremona from its former patron. In 1206, he was appointed, along with the Archdeacon and Canon Peter of Parma, to a commission against Mantua, which was building a bridge over the Zara River and erecting a fort, which threatened Reggio; the commission was granted power to impose an interdict on Mantua.

He supported Frederick II against the Holy Roman Emperor Otto IV of Braunschweig.

Sicardo died in Cremona on 8 June 1215. Two days before his death, however, several Canons issued a call for an electoral meeting to choose his successor. They duly met and elected the Archpriest Dompnettum. One of the Canons chose to appeal to the Holy See. When Pope Innocent heard of the circumstances of the election, he immediately quashed the election, and on 3 December 1216, announced that he had consecrated a new bishop for Cremona.

== Works ==
- Chronica Universalis (1213) – covers universal history from the creation to 1213. It was used extensively by Salimbene de Adam in his Chronica.
- Summa Canonum (Mainz, 1179-1181) – a digest of canon law.
- Apologia Sichardi – a defence against his detractors.
- Mitrale - a work on ecclesiastical liturgy in 9 books. It was published in a new edition: Sicardi Cremonensis episcopi Mitralis de officiis, ed. Gábor Sarbak and Lorenz Weinrich (Turnhout: Brepols, 2008).

== Sources ==
- Brocchieri, Ercole (1958). Sicardo di Cremona e la sua opera letteraria (in Italian). Cremona: Athenaeum Cremonense.
- Coleman, E. "Sicard of Cremona as legate of Innocent III in Lombardy," in: A. Sommerlechner (2003) (ed.), Innocenzo III Urbs et Orbis. Atti del Congresso internazionale (Roma 9-15 settembre 1998), Roma 2003 (Istituto Storico Italiano per il Medio Evo, Nuovi Studi Storici, 55; Miscellanea della Società Romana di Storia Patria, XLIV), II, pp. 929-953. (in Italian)
- Holder-Egger, O. (1903). "De vita Sicardi," in: Georg Heinrich Pertz (1903). Monumenta Germaniae historica inde ab anno Christi quingentesimo usque ad annum millesimum et quingentesimum: Scriptorum (in Latin). Vol. Tomus XXXI. Hannover: Impensis Bibliopolii, Hahniani. pp. 22–59.
- Leoni, Valeria (2005). "Privilegia episcopii Cremonensis. Il cartulario vescovile di Cremona e il vescovo Sicardo (1185-1215)." Scrineum Rivista 3 (2005), pp. 75-122. (in Italian)
- Sanclemente, Enrico (1814). Series critico-chronologica episcoporum Cremonensium (in Italian). Cremona: J. Feraboli. pp. 98–104.
