= Il Pordenone =

Italian painter (c.1484–1539)

Pordenone
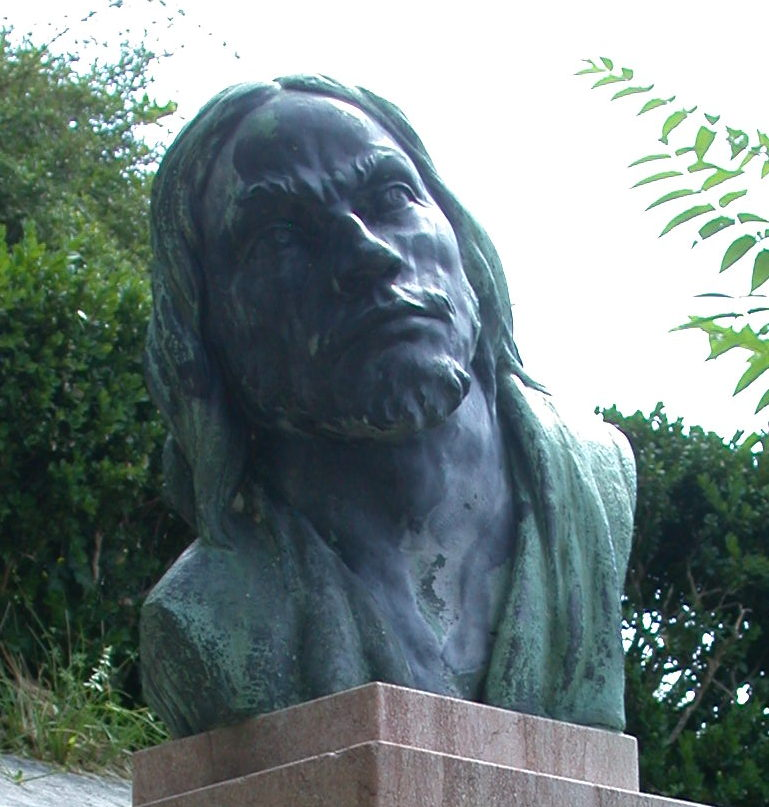
- Modern head in Udine
- Born: Giovanni Antonio de’ Sacchis c. 1484; Pordenone
- Died: 14 January 1539; Ferrara
- Known for: Painting
- Movement: Mannerism

Pordenone, Il Pordenone in Italian, is the byname of Giovanni Antonio de’ Sacchis (c. 1484 – 14 January 1539), an Italian Mannerist painter, loosely of the Venetian school. Vasari, his main biographer, wrongly identifies him as Giovanni Antonio Licinio. He painted in several cities in northern Italy "with speed, vigor, and deliberate coarseness of expression and execution—intended to shock".

He appears to have visited Rome, and learnt from its High Renaissance masterpieces, but lacked a good training in anatomical drawing. Like Polidoro da Caravaggio, he was one of the artists often commissioned to paint the exteriors of buildings; of such work at most a shadow survives after centuries of weather. Michelangelo is said to have approved of one palace facade in 1527; it is now only known from a preparatory drawing. Much of his work was lost when the Doge's Palace in Venice was largely destroyed by fires in 1574 and 1577. A number of fresco cycles survive, for example part of one at Cremona Cathedral, where his Passion scenes have a violence hardly repeated until Goya. Another cycle was at the Scuola Grande della Carità in Venice, now the Gallerie dell'Accademia, the main art museum, where he worked with the young Tintoretto.

His life was as energetic and restless as his art; he married three times, and was accused in court of hiring criminals to kill his brother to avoid sharing their inheritance. He perhaps had some influence on later works by Titian and more clearly on Tintoretto, who to some extent took over his position as the leading painter of large mural commissions in Venice. Titian and Pordenone were rivals in his last decade and gossip even claimed that his death was suspicious.

== Biography ==
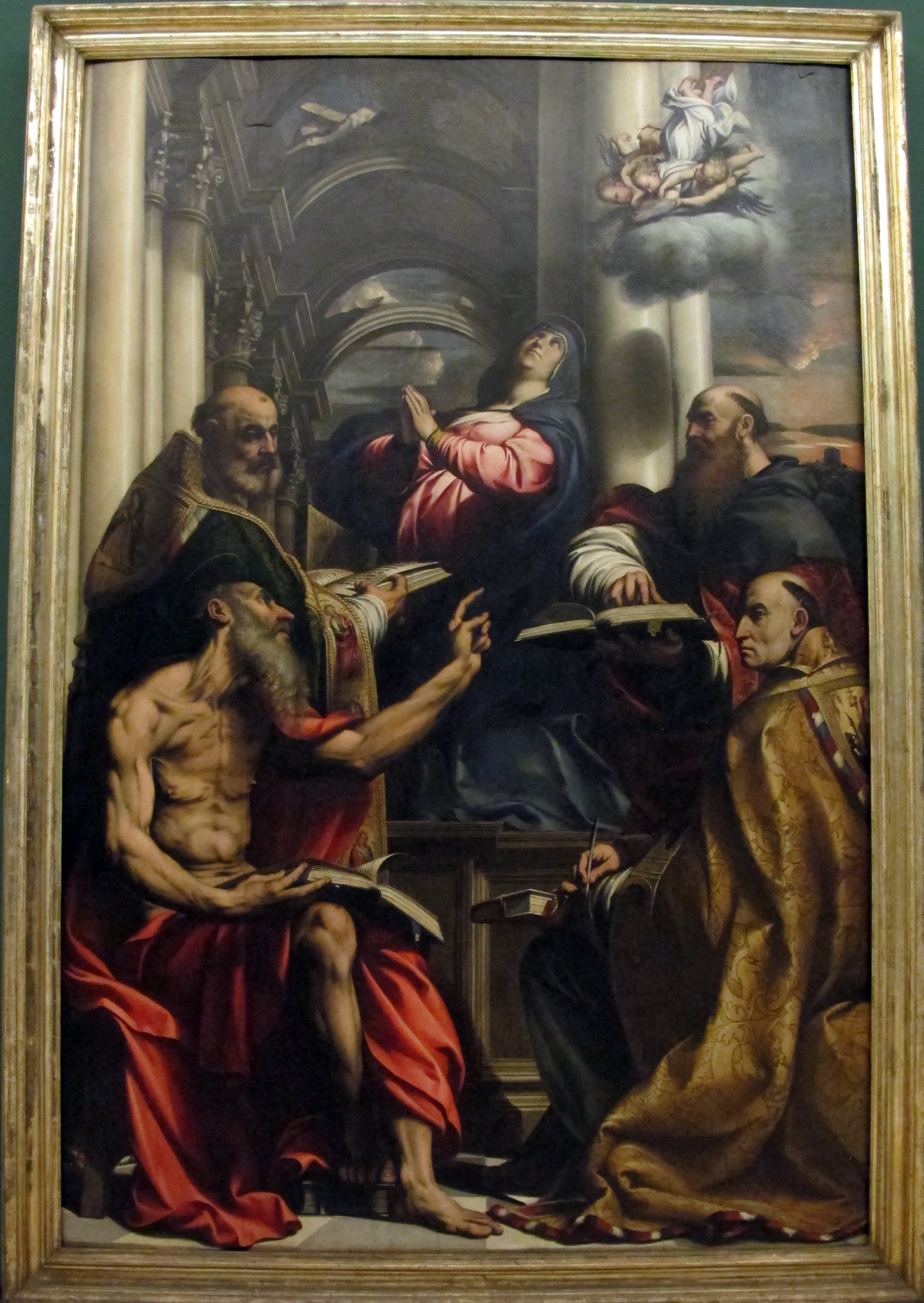
Debate over Immaculate Conception, Farnese collection in Capodimonte Museum, Naples; originally from the Church of the Annunziata, Cortemaggiore.

His name derives from being born in Pordenone in Friuli, though his family came from Corticelle (Brescia, Lombardy). He ultimately dropped the name of de’ Sacchis, having quarrelled with his brother Bartolomeo, who had wounded him in the hand. He then called himself Regillo, or De Regillo. His signature runs Antonius Portusnaonensis, or De Portunaonis. He was knighted as a cavaliere by the Hungarian King John Zápolya.

As a painter, Pordenone was a scholar of Pellegrino da San Daniele, but a leading influence of his style was Giorgione; the popular story that he was a fellow-pupil with Titian under Giovanni Bellini is false. It was claimed that Pordenone's first commission was given him by a grocer in his home town, to try his boast that he could paint a picture as the priest commenced High Mass, and complete it by the time Mass was over; he completed the picture in the required time. The district about Pordenone had been somewhat fertile in capable painters; but Pordenone is the best known, a vigorous chiaroscurist and flesh painter. The 1911 Britannica states that "so far as mere flesh-painting is concerned he was barely inferior to Titian in breadth, pulpiness and tone". The two were rivals for a time, and Giovanni Antonio would sometimes affect to wear arms while he was painting. He excelled in portraits; he was equally at home in fresco and in oil-color. He executed many works in Pordenone and elsewhere in Friuli, Cremona, and Venice; at one time he settled in Piacenza, where one of his most celebrated church pictures, St. Catherine disputing with the Doctors in Alexandria is located. The figure of St. Roch, in the Dome of Pordenone is considered his own portrait.

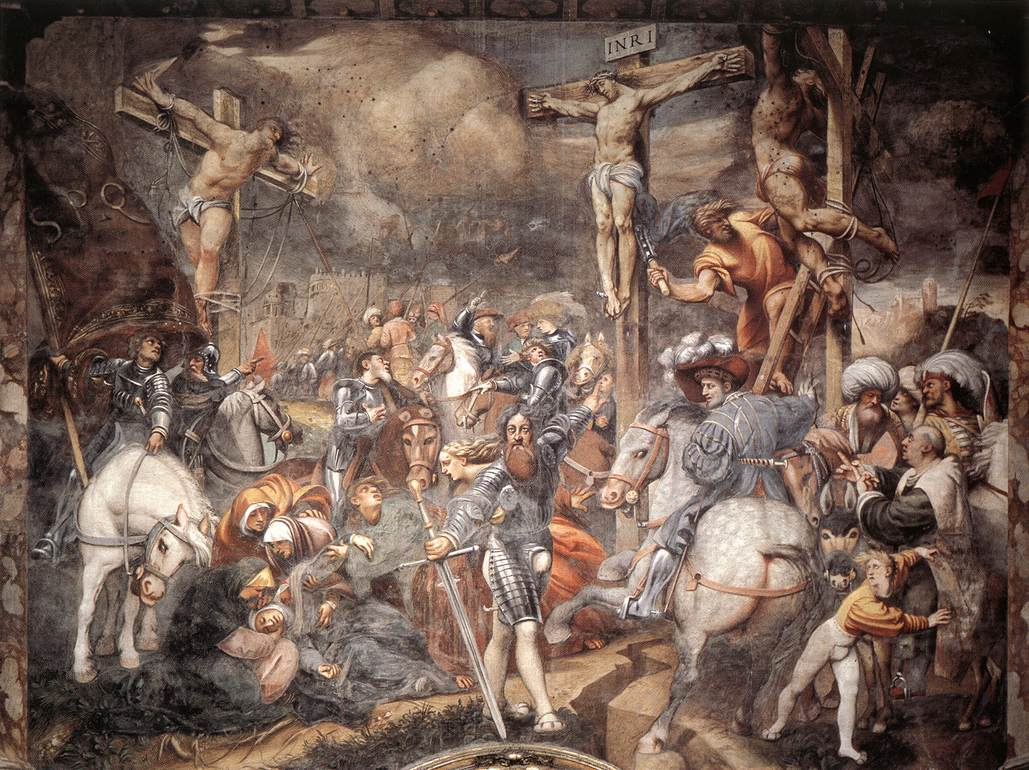
Golgotha, Cathedral of Cremona

He was invited by Duke Ercole II of Ferrara to court; here soon afterwards, in 1539, he died, not without suspicion of poison committed by Titian. His later works are comparatively careless and superficial; and generally he is better in male figures than in female-the latter being somewhat too sturdy-and the composition of his subject-pictures is scarcely on a level with their other merits. Pordenone appears to have been a vehement self-asserting man, to which his style as a painter corresponds.

Three of his principal pupils were Bernardino Licinio, named Il Sacchiense, his son-in-law Pomponio Amalteo, and Giovanni Maria Calderari.

== Partial anthology of works ==
- Study of the Martyrdom of St Peter Martyr (1526, J. Paul Getty Museum)
- St Bonaventure (National Gallery, London)
- St Louis of Toulouse (National Gallery, London)
- Saints Prosdocimus and Peter (1516, North Carolina Museum of Art, Raleigh).
- Golgotha (1520–21, fresco, Cathedral of Cremona)
- Enthroned Madonna and Child with Saints (c. 1525, Parish church, Susegana, Treviso)
- St Lorenzo Giustiniani and Other Saints (1532, originally in Santa Maria dell'Orto, now Accademia, Venice)
- Enthroned Madonna and Child with Saints (1525)
- Cupula Frescoes: Scenes from Old Testament, Basilica di Santa Maria di Campagna, Piacenza
- Saints Martin and Christopher (1528–29, Church of San Rocco, Venice)
- St Lorenzo Giustiniani and Two Friars with Saints (1532, Galleria dell'Accademia, Florence)
- Saints Sebastian, Roch and Catherine (1535, Church of San Giovanni Elemosinario, Venice)
- Enthroned Madonna and Child with Saints (1525, Parish Church, Grandcamp, France).
- Dispute of St Catherine with Pagan Philosophers (Cathedral of Piacenza)
- Deposition and Immaculate Conception (1530, Church of the Annunziata, Cortemaggiore)
- St Gottardo with Saints Sebastian and Rocco (Museo Civico d'Arte, Pordenone)
- St Catherine and Martyrs (Museo Civico di Conegliano)
- Drawings from Ambrosiana Library, Milan
- Magi (Treviso Cathedral)
- Giuditta (Judith) (attrib.) (Galleria Borghese)
