= Diocese of Cremona =

Roman Catholic diocese in Italy

Coordinates: 45.1333°N 10.0333°E

Diocese of Cremona Dioecesis Cremonensis

Catholic
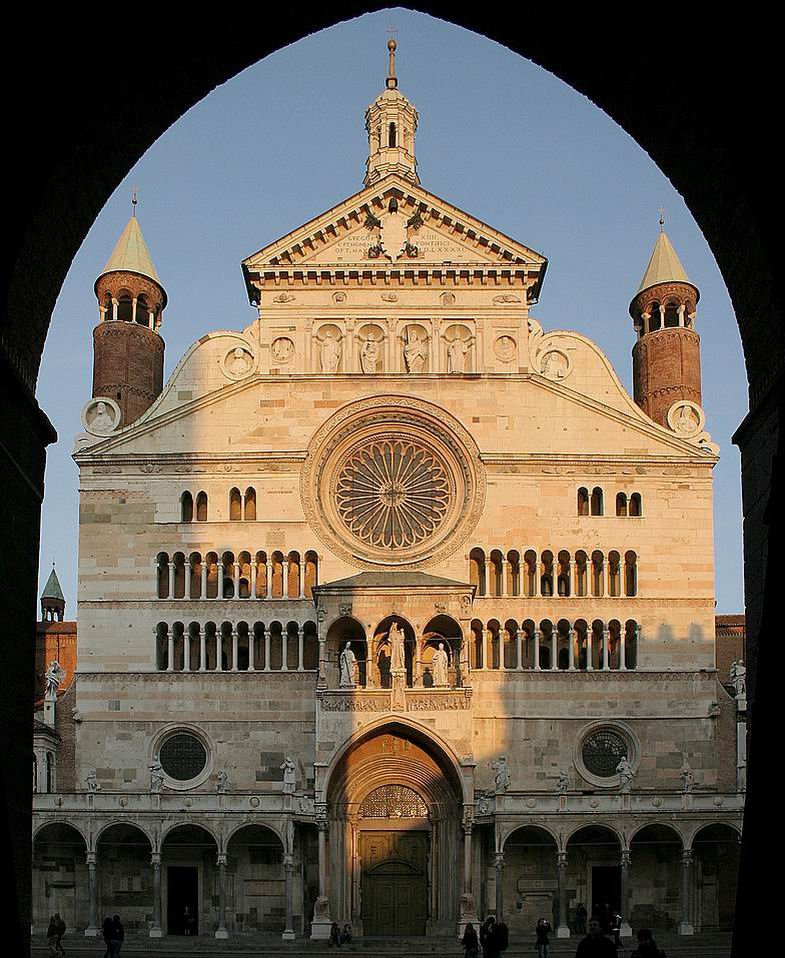
- Cremona Cathedral

Location
- Country: Italy
- Ecclesiastical province: Milan

Statistics
- Area: 1,917 km^{2} (740 sq mi)
- Population: Total; Catholics: (as of 2021); 360,956; 312,400 (est.) (86.5%)
- Parishes: 222

Information
- Denomination: Catholic Church
- Sui iuris church: Latin Church
- Rite: Roman Rite
- Established: 4th century
- Cathedral: Cattedrale di S. Maria Assunta
- Secular priests: 258 (diocesan); 20 (Religious Orders); 15 Permanent Deacons

Current leadership
- Pope: Leo XIV
- Bishop: Antonio Napolioni
- Bishops emeritus: Dante Lafranconi

Map

Website
- www.diocesidicremona.it

The Diocese of Cremona (Latin: Dioecesis Cremonensis) is a Latin Church ecclesiastical territory or diocese of the Catholic Church in northern Italy. It is a suffragan diocese in the ecclesiastical province of the metropolitan Archdiocese of Milan. The bishop of Cremona's cathedra is in the Cathedral of the Assumption of the Virgin Mary.

As of 2008, the Diocese of Cremona had 223 parishes, all located within the region of Lombardy, and the majority (174) within the Province of Cremona, besides 28 in the Province of Mantua, 17 in the Province of Bergamo, and 4 in the Province of Milan.

== History ==
Cremona is in Lombardy, Italy, on the left (north) bank of the River Po. It was built by the Cenomani Gauls, but later became a Roman colony and a frontier fortress.

The tradition of Cremona considers St. Sabinus to be its first missionary and first bishop; he is said to have lived in the 1st century, though there is no documentary or monumental proof of his existence. His putative successor, Felix (c. 86) is known only from the name of a church. Among the early bishops are S. Syrinus (c. 340), a mere name but said to be a vigorous opponent of Arianism because of his alleged date, and S. Silvinus (733). Liudprand of Cremona was sent (946) as ambassador to Constantinople by the Emperor Otto II, and is a noted historical writer of the 10th century.

On 21 September 603, Cremona, until then a part of the Byzantine Empire, was captured by the Lombard king, Agilulf and completely destroyed. Under the Emperor Otto I (962–973) and his successors, its bishops acquired temporal sovereignty, but the people expelled Bishop Oldericus (973–1004) and adopted a republican form of government. On 26 February 1004, Bishop Oldericus obtained from Adelmus (a.k.a. Azo), the royal Missus of King Arduin (1002–1014), the royal ban against anyone who attempted to seize properties belonging to the bishop.

In 987, Bishop Oldericus founded a Benedictine monastery in honor of S. Lawrence in Cremona. In 1546 the Benedictines were succeeded by Olivetan monks. The monastery was suppressed by the French occupation administration in 1797.

In 1104, the diocese received a new bishop, Landulfus, a German and a Councillor and Chaplain of the Emperor Henry II, whose ascent was patronized by Henry's queen, Cunegonda. Landulfus was insensitive, arrogant, and overbearing. He was particularly hostile to his predecessor's foundation, the monastery of S. Lorenzo. His ill-treatment of the monks roused the anger of the citizens of Cremona, who had already twice suffered under the invasion of German imperial armies. They expelled Bishop Landulfus from the city, confiscated all his goods, and razed the bishop's castle to its foundations. The bishop's servants who were inside the castle were able to make an arrangement with the canons of the cathedral to ransom themselves with all of their goods, but their houses were destroyed. Bishop Landulfus was not able to reoccupy his episcopal seat until around 1010.

The Emperor Henry IV (1056–1106), however, confirmed Bishop Landulf in all imperial grants made to his predecessors. On the other hand Emperor Henry V (1106–25) restored to the people their communal rights. Thenceforth Cremona became a citadel of Ghibellinism and was greatly favoured by Frederic Barbarossa and Emperor Frederick II, though for the same reason frequently at war with the neighbouring cities.

In 1107, the city committed itself to the building of a new cathedral, and laid the first cornerstone in the absence of the bishop. In 1113, after his return, Bishop Landulfus held a diocesan synod, but the city was consumed by a fire on 10 August 1113. Then, on 3 January 1117, a major earthquake struck the Veneto and Lombardy, ruining the cathedral.

In 1211 and 1212, the papal legate Gerard of Sessa used Cremona as his base of operations in Lombardy, and employed Bishop Sicard of Cremona in some of his activities.

In later medieval times Cremona had many lords or "tyrants", the Pallavicini, the Dovara, the Cavalcabo, the Visconti of Milan (1334–1402), the Sforza, until it became part of the Duchy of Milan (1328). The commune of Cremona was abolished by Azzo Visconti in 1334. In 1702 it was taken by imperial troops, and in 1796 and 1800 fell into the hands of the French.

Other important bishops were Gualtiero (1096), in whose time the cathedral was begun; Sicardus (1185–1215), author of a chronicle and of the Mitrale, a handbook on ecclesiastical offices; Cacciaconte da Somma (1261–1285), under whom was erected the belfry of the cathedral; Niccolo Sfondrati (1560–1590), later Pope Gregory XIV; his nephew Cardinal Paolo Sfondrati (1607–1610); also the zealous and charitable Omobono di Offredi (1791–1829).

Bartolomeo Platina, the papal scriptor, Librarian of the Vatican Library, and noted author of papal biographies, who was born in the village of Piadena (Platina), seven miles east of Cremona, styled himself Cremonensis.

Cremona lost part of its territory to the newly established Diocese of Crema in 1579 for political reasons, as Cremona was Spanish while Crema was Venetian at time.

=== The complicated election of 1313 ===
Bishop Raynerius de Casulo died two or three days before Christmas 1312. The preliminary meeting to summon electors to a meeting to elect his successor met on 15 February 1313, and fixed 17 February as the day of the election. Twelve electors met on 17 February in the choir of the cathedral, and announced their votes on oath in a scrutiny. Six of the twelve cast their votes for Canon Egidiolus de Bonseriis, four for Canon and Cantor Egidius de Madalbertis, one for Canon Joannes de Parma, and one for the archpriest. Egidiolus had half of the votes, but not a majority. Bickering began immediately. Egidiolus' party claimed that his supporters were older, were more outstanding in merit, and held more prestigious positions; they claimed that Egidius was not in Holy Orders, and therefore should not be electable. The other party pointed out that, while Egidiolus had more votes than Egidius, he had not reached a majority and his supporters were not the sanior pars of the electors; moreover, he possessed insufficient knowledge and his lifestyle was not commendable (as required by the Lateran Council).

Each party however proclaimed its candidate elected, and sang a Te Deum.

Sanclemente, relying on the authority of an unpublished manuscript by Giuseppe Maria Bonafossa, states that Egidiolus immediately demanded confirmation of his election from his metropolitan, Archbishop Gaston of Milan. The archbishop took the plea, and granted Egidiolus possession and administration rights. Egidiolus' opponents immediately registered a complaint with the archbishop, and demanded the confirmation of Egidius de Madalbertis, according to Cappelletti. In due course, the suits reached the papal Court. Unfortunately, Pope Clement V died on 20 April 1314, before the impasse was resolved. The papal Sede vacante lasted until 7 August 1316, when the Conclave elected Cardinal Jacques Duèse as Pope John XXII.

Pope John XXII finally issued a ruling on 18 July 1318, stating that Egidius de Madalbertis, Canon of the Church of Cremona, was the bishop of Cremona, to which he had been elected following the death of Bishop Raynerius. Egidiolus is referred to only as the other candidate in the contested election, and is not called a bishop. Since bishop-elect Egidius was still living in Avignon on 4 August 1319, he assigned to Frater Thomas of the house of S. Abundantius in Cremona the care of the physical fabric of the cathedral. Conditions in Cremona at the time are revealed in a letter to the Abbess and nuns of the monastery of Cistello, just outside the walls of Cremona, dated 6 October 1319; he commiserates with the nuns over the fact that they have been forced to abandon their monastery because of the incursions of hostile persons, and take up residence inside the city in houses of private individuals. Because they had been despoiled of all their property, they were forced to beg in the streets. In 1322, Duke Galeazzo Visconti seized Cremona. On 20 September 1325, Pope John sent a letter to Cardinal Giacomo Caetani Stefaneschi of S. Giorgio ad velum aureum, authorizing him to accept Bishop-elect Egidius' resignation, and to take charge of the administration of the diocese himself. Egidius had never been able to enter his diocese or take possession of his see due to the civil war which had enveloped Cremona. The Ghibellines had seized the city and the diocese and were triumphant against the papal government.

On 13 September 1319, Pope John XXII issued the bull "Imminente Nobis", reserving to the papacy the right of appointment to all benefices, archiepiscopal, episcopal, collegiate, abbatial, monasterial, prioral, and all other ecclesiastical places, whether secular or regular, exempt (from episcopal control) or not. In this grand seizure of power, the Papacy deprived all chapters of the right to elect their head. The right of the chapter of Cremona to elect its bishop was ended.

A new bishop for Cremona was appointed by John XXII in a letter of 6 March 1327. In 1328, the Emperor Louis the Bavarian seized Cremona.

=== Synods ===
A diocesan synod was an irregularly held, but important, meeting of the bishop of a diocese and his clergy. Its purpose was (1) to proclaim generally the various decrees already issued by the bishop; (2) to discuss and ratify measures on which the bishop chose to consult with his clergy; (3) to publish statutes and decrees of the diocesan synod, of the provincial synod, and of the Holy See.

In 1550, Cardinal Francesco Sfondrati, Bishop of Cremona (1549–1550), issued a set of constitutions and edicts to be observed in his diocese. In his letter of transmittal, he admits that his predecessors for more than seventy years, because of their long absences, had allowed some of the clergy and people of the diocese to go wrong, which made corrections both beneficial and necessary.

Bishop Cesare Speciano (1591–1607) held a diocesan synod in Cremona in 1599. He held his second diocesan synod in 1604. Cardinal Pietro Campori (1621–1643) held a diocesan synod in 1635.

Bishop Alessandro Litta (1718–1749) held a diocesan synod in the cathedral in Cremona on 28–30 April 1727.

== Bishops ==
The Diocese of Cremona provides a list of its bishops on its official web site. Of the bishops of the first eight centuries, it recognizes only Joannes (451), Eustasius (501), Desiderius (679), and Stephanus (774).

=== to 900 ===
- Stephen (320–342 ?)
- Sirinus (342–380)
- Auderius (381–391)
- Conrad
- Vincent (407–?)
- Sirinus II (422–451)
- John I (attested 451)
- Eustasius, Eustachius (491– c. 513)
- Crisogonus (513–537)
- Felix (537–562)
- Creato (563 – c. 584)
- Sixtus (584 – c. 609)
- Desiderius (609–610)
- Anselm (610–?)
- Eusebius (c. 637–?)
- Bernard (670–?)
- Desiderius (attested 679)
- Zeno, OSB (703–?)
- Silvino (733–?)
- Stephen II (776–?)
- Walfred (816–818)
- Atto (818–823)
- Siniperto degli Addobati (823–840?)
- Panchoard (840–851?)
- Benedict (c. 851 – c. 881)
- Lando (c. 881–c.910?)

=== 900 to 1200 ===
- John (attested c. 915–924)
- Dagibert (attested 931–960)
- Liutprand (attested 962–970/972)
- Olderic (attested 973–1004)
- Landulf (1007–1030)
- Ubald (1031–1067)
- Arnulf (1068–1078)
- Walter (attested 1096)
- Hugh of Noceto
- Ubert (1087–1095)

...

- Ubert (1118–1162)
- Presbyter de Medolao (1163–1167)
- Emmanuel, O.Cist. (1 May 1167 – 27 February 1168)
- Offredo degli Offredi (1168–1185)
- Sicard (1185–1215)

=== 1200 to 1500 ===
- Omobono de Madalberti (c. 1215–1248)
  - Giovanni Buono de Geroldi (1248–1249) (bishop-elect)
- Bernerio (1249 – c. 1260)
- Cacciaconte da Somma (1261–1288)
- Ponzio Ponzoni (1288–1290)
- Bonizo (c. 1290– c. 1294)
- Raynerius de Casulo (1296–1312)

[Egidiolo Bonseri (1313–1317)]

- Egidio Madalberti (1318–1325) Bishop-elect
- Ugolino di San Marco, O.P. (1327–1349)

Dondino (1328–1331) Intrusus

- Ugolino Ardengheri (1349–1361)
- Pietro Capello (1361–1383)
- Marco Porri (1383–1386)
- Giorgio Torti (1386–1389)
- Tommaso Visconti (1390)
- Francesco Lante, O.F.M. (1390–1401)
- Pietro Grassi (1401–1402)
- Francesco Lante (1402–1405)
- Bartolomeo Capra (1405–1411)
- Costanzo Fondulo (1412–1423)
- Venturino de Marni, OSB (1423–1457)
- Bernardo Rossi (1458–1466)
- Giovanni Stefano Botticelli (1466–1472)
- Jacopo-Antonio dalla Torre (1476–1486)
- Cardinal Ascanio Maria Sforza (1486–1505) Administrator

=== 1500 to 1800 ===
Cardinal Galeotto Franciotti della Rovere (1505–1507 Resigned) Administrator

- Gerolamo Trevisan, O.Cist. (1507–1523)
- Pietro Accolti (1523/4, resigned)
- Benedetto Accolti (1523–1549)
- Cardinal Francesco Sfondrati (1549–1550)
- Federico Cesi (1551–1560 Resigned)
- Niccolò Sfondrati (1560–1590)
- Cesare Speciano (1591–1607)
- Cardinal Paolo Camillo Sfondrati (1607–1610 Resigned)
- Giambattista Brivio (1610–1621)
- Cardinal Pietro Campori (1621–1643)
- Francesco Visconti (1643–1670 Resigned)
- Pietro Isimbardi, O. Carm. (1670–1675)
- Agostino Isimbardi, O.S.B. (1676–1681 Died)
- Lodovico Septala (1682–1697)
- Alessandro Croce (1697–1704)
- Carlo Ottaviano Guasco (1704–1717)
- Alessandro Maria Litta (1718–1749 Resigned)
- Ignazio Maria Fraganeschi (1749–1790)
- Omobono Offredi (1791–1829)

=== since 1831 ===
- Carlo Emmanuelle Sardagna de Hohenstein (1831–1837 Resigned)
- Bartolomeo Casati (1839–1844)
- Bartolomeo Carlo Romilli (1846–1847)
- Antonio Novasconi (1850–1867)
- Geremia Bonomelli (1871–1914)
- Giovanni Cazzani (1914–1952)
- Danio Bolognini (1952–1972)
- Giuseppe Amari (1973–1978)
- Fiorino Tagliaferri (1978–1983 Resigned)
- Enrico Assi (1983–1992)
- Giulio Nicolini (1993–2001)
- Dante Lafranconi (2001–2015 Retired)
- Antonio Napolioni (2015–)

== See also ==
- List of bishops of Cremona (in Italian)
- Timeline of Cremona

== Bibliography ==
=== Episcopal lists ===
- Gams, Pius Bonifatius (1873). Series episcoporum Ecclesiae catholicae: quotquot innotuerunt a beato Petro apostolo. Ratisbon: Typis et Sumptibus Georgii Josephi Manz. pp. 777–779. (in Latin)
- Eubel, Conradus, ed. (1913). Hierarchia catholica. Vol. Tomus 1 (second ed.). Münster: Libreria Regensbergiana. (in Latin)
- Eubel, Conradus, ed. (1914). Hierarchia catholica. Vol. Tomus 2 (second ed.). Münster: Libreria Regensbergiana. (in Latin)
- Gulik, Guilelmus (1923). Eubel, Conradus (ed.). Hierarchia catholica. Vol. Tomus 3 (second ed.). Münster: Libreria Regensbergiana. (in Latin)
- Gauchat, Patritius (Patrice) (1935). Hierarchia catholica. Vol. Tomus IV (1592-1667). Münster: Libraria Regensbergiana. (in Latin)
- Ritzler, Remigius; Sefrin, Pirminus (1952). Hierarchia catholica medii et recentis aevi V (1667-1730). Patavii: Messagero di S. Antonio.
- Ritzler, Remigius; Sefrin, Pirminus (1958). Hierarchia catholica medii et recentis aevi. Vol. Tomus VI (1730-1799). Patavii: Messagero di S. Antonio. (in Latin)
- Ritzler, Remigius; Sefrin, Pirminus (1968). Hierarchia Catholica medii et recentioris aevi sive summorum pontificum, S. R. E. cardinalium, ecclesiarum antistitum series... A pontificatu Pii PP. VII (1800) usque ad pontificatum Gregorii PP. XVI (1846) (in Latin). Vol. VII. Monasterii: Libr. Regensburgiana.
- Remigius Ritzler; Pirminus Sefrin (1978). Hierarchia catholica Medii et recentioris aevi... A Pontificatu PII PP. IX (1846) usque ad Pontificatum Leonis PP. XIII (1903) (in Latin). Vol. VIII. Il Messaggero di S. Antonio.
- Pięta, Zenon (2002). Hierarchia catholica medii et recentioris aevi... A pontificatu Pii PP. X (1903) usque ad pontificatum Benedictii PP. XV (1922) (in Latin). Vol. IX. Padua: Messagero di San Antonio. ISBN 978-88-250-1000-8.

=== Studies ===
- Annales Cremonenses (ed. O. Holder-Egger). In: Georg Heinrich Pertz (1903). Monumenta Germaniae historica inde ab anno Christi quingentesimo usque ad annum millesimum et quingentesimum: Scriptorum (in Latin). Vol. Tomus XXXI. Hannover: Impensis Bibliopolii, Hahniani. pp. 1–21.
- Aporti, Ferrante (1835). Memorie di Storia ecclesiastica Cremonese: Dall'anno 1 al 1335 dell'era volgare (in Italian). Vol. Parte 1. Cremona: Manini. - 20 Aporti, Ferrante sec. 19 (1837). Parte 2.
- Astegiano, Lorenzo, ed. (1895). Codex diplomaticus Cremonae (in Latin). Vol. I. Turin: Apud fratres Bocca.
- Cappelletti, Giuseppe (1856). Le chiese d'Italia dalla loro origine sino ai nostri giorni (in Italian). Vol. undecimo. Venice: G. Antonelli.
- Cremona città imperiale. Nell’VIII centenario della nascita di Federico II. Atti del Convegno Internazionale di Studi (Cremona, 27-28 ottobre 1995). Cremona 1999 (Annali della Biblioteca Statale e Libreria civica di Cremona, XLIX). (in Italian)
- Dragoni, Antonio (1840). Sulla storia ecclesiastica Cremonese nei primi tre secoli del Cristianesimo Discorsi o disquisizioni critiche (in Italian). Cremona: Giuseppe Feraboli.
- Filippini, E. (2001), "Il vescovo Sicardo di Cremona (1185–1215) e la fondazione del monastero di San Giovanni del Deserto," in Annali dell'Istituto storico italogermanico in Trento XXVII (2001), pp. 13–56. (in Italian)
- Gualazzini, U. (1972). "Falsificazioni di fonti dell’età paleocristiana e altomedievale nella storiografia cremonese". Cremona 1975 (Annali delle Biblioteca Statale e Libreria Civica di Cremon, XXIII, 1972), pp. 31–32, 51–78. (in Italian)
- Kehr, Paul Fridolin (1913). Italia pontificia : sive, Repertorium privilegiorum et litterarum a romanis pontificibus ante annum 1598 Italiae ecclesiis, monasteriis, civitatibus singulisque personis concessorum. Vol. VI. pars i. Berolini: Weidmann. (in Latin)
- Lanzoni, Francesco (1927). Le diocesi d'Italia dalle origini al principio del secolo VII (an. 604), vol. II, Faenza 1927. (in Italian)
- Leoni, Valeria (2005). "Privilegia episcopii Cremonensis. Il cartulario vescovile di Cremona e il vescovo Sicardo (1185-1215)". (in Italian) Scrineum Rivista, 3 (Firenze: Firenze UP 2005), pp. 75–122.
- Novati, Francesco, "L' Obituario della cattedrale di Cremona," in: Archivio storico lombardo. 1880. VII (Milano 1880), pp. 245–276. Archivio storico lombardo. 1881. VIII (1881), pp. 246–266, and 484–506. (in Italian)
- Robolotti, Francesco (1878). Repertorio diplomatico Cremonese: Dall'anno 715 al 1200 (in Italian). Vol. primo. Cremona: Ronzi e Signori.
- Sanclemente, Enrico (1814). Series critico-chronologica episcoporum Cremonensium (in Italian). Cremona: J. Feraboli.
- Schwartz, Gerhard (1907). Die Besetzung der Bistümer Reichsitaliens unter den sächsischen und salischen Kaisern: mit den Listen der Bischöfe, 951-1122. Leipzig: B.G. Teubner. pp. 109–115. (in German)
- Sigard, Bishop of Cremona. Cronica (ed. O. Holder-Egger). In: Georg Heinrich Pertz (1903). Monumenta Germaniae historica inde ab anno Christi quingentesimo usque ad annum millesimum et quingentesimum: Scriptorum (in Latin). Vol. Tomus XXXI. Hannover: Impensis Bibliopolii, Hahniani. pp. 22–181.
- Ughelli, Ferdinando; Coleti, Niccolò (1719). Italia sacra sive De episcopis Italiæ, et insularum adjacentium (in Latin). Vol. Tomus quartus (4). Venice: apud Sebastianum Coleti. pp. 404–519.
