= Francesco de Aiello =

Italian Catholic bishop (d. 1453)

Most Reverend Francesco de Aiello
- Archbishop of Bari-Canosa
- Church: Catholic Church
- Archdiocese: Archdiocese of Bari-Canosa
- In office: 1424–1453
- Predecessor: Nicolaus Paganus
- Successor: Guido Giudano
- Previous posts: Bishop of Cava de' Tirreni (1394–1407); Bishop of Todi (1407–1424)

Personal details
- Died: 1453

Francesco de Aiello (died 1453) was a Roman Catholic prelate who served as Archbishop of Bari-Canosa (1424–1453), Bishop of Todi (1407–1424), and Bishop of Cava de' Tirreni (1394–1407).

== Biography ==
On 7 August 1394, Francesco de Aiello was appointed during the papacy of Pope Boniface IX as Bishop of Cava de' Tirreni. On 30 December 1407, he was appointed during the papacy of Pope Gregory XII as Bishop of Todi. In 1424, he was appointed during the papacy of Pope Martin V as Archbishop of Bari-Canosa. He served as Archbishop of Bari-Canosa until his death in 1453.

== External links and additional sources ==
- Cheney, David M. "Diocese of Cava e Sarno". Catholic-Hierarchy.org. (for Chronology of Bishops) ^{[self-published]}
- Chow, Gabriel. "Diocese of Cava de' Tirreni". GCatholic.org. (for Chronology of Bishops) ^{[self-published]}
- Cheney, David M. "Diocese of Todi". Catholic-Hierarchy.org. (for Chronology of Bishops) ^{[self-published]}
- Chow, Gabriel. "Diocese of Todi (Italy)". GCatholic.org. (for Chronology of Bishops) ^{[self-published]}
- Cheney, David M. "Archdiocese of Bari-Bitonto". Catholic-Hierarchy.org. (for Chronology of Bishops) ^{[self-published]}
- Chow, Gabriel. "Metropolitan Archdiocese of Bari–Bitonto (Italy)". GCatholic.org. (for Chronology of Bishops) ^{[self-published]}

Catholic Church titles
Preceded by None	Bishop of Cava de' Tirreni; 1394–1407	Succeeded by Francesco Mormile
Preceded by Guglielmo della Vigna	Bishop of Todi; 1407–1424	Succeeded by Bartolomeo Aglioni
Preceded by Nicolaus Paganus	Archbishop of Bari-Canosa; 1424–1453	Succeeded by Guido Giudano
