= Constantin Eruli =

Roman Catholic prelate (died 1500)

Most Reverend Constantin Eruli
- Bishop of Spoleto
- Church: Catholic Church
- Diocese: Diocese of Spoleto
- In office: 1474–1500
- Predecessor: Berardo Eroli
- Successor: Francesco Erulli
- Previous posts: Bishop of Narni (1462–1472); Bishop of Todi (1472–1474)

Personal details
- Died: 1500 Spoleto, Italy

Constantin Eruli (also Costantino Eroli) (died 1500) was a Roman Catholic prelate who served as Bishop of Spoleto (1474–1500), Bishop of Todi (1472–1474), Bishop of Narni (1462–1472).

== Biography ==
On 10 December 1462, he was appointed during the papacy of Pope Pius II as Bishop of Narni. On 8 January 1472, he was appointed during the papacy of Pope Sixtus IV as Bishop of Todi. On 8 December 1474, he was appointed during the papacy of Sixtus IV as Bishop of Spoleto. He served as Bishop of Spoleto until his death in 1500. While bishop, he was the principal co-consecrator of Agostino Patrizi de Piccolomini, Bishop of Pienza.

== External links and additional sources ==
- Cheney, David M. "Diocese of Narni". Catholic-Hierarchy.org. (Chronology of Bishops) ^{[self-published]}
- Chow, Gabriel. "Diocese of Narni (Italy)". GCatholic.org. Archived from the original on February 4, 2014. (Chronology of Bishops) ^{[self-published]}
- Cheney, David M. "Diocese of Todi". Catholic-Hierarchy.org. (for Chronology of Bishops) ^{[self-published]}
- Chow, Gabriel. "Diocese of Todi (Italy)". GCatholic.org. (for Chronology of Bishops) ^{[self-published]}
- Cheney, David M. "Archdiocese of Spoleto-Norcia". Catholic-Hierarchy.org. (Chronology of Bishops) ^{[self-published]}
- Chow, Gabriel. "Archdiocese of Spoleto-Norcia (Italy)". GCatholic.org. (Chronology of Bishops) ^{[self-published]}

Catholic Church titles
Preceded by	Bishop of Narni; 1474–1500	Succeeded by Carlo Boccardini
Preceded by Bartolomeo Aglioni	Bishop of Todi; 1472–1474	Succeeded by Paolo Emilio Cesi
Preceded by Berardo Eroli	Bishop of Spoleto; 1474–1500	Succeeded by Francesco Erulli
