= Bernardino Buratti =

17th-century Roman Catholic bishop

Most Reverend Bernardino Buratti
- Archbishop of Manfredonia
- Church: Catholic Church
- Archdiocese: Archdiocese of Manfredonia
- In office: 1623–1628
- Predecessor: Giovanni Severini (bishop)
- Successor: André Caracciolo
- Previous post: Bishop of Vulturara e Montecorvino (1615–1623)

Orders
- Consecration: 5 Apr 1615 by Metello Bichi

Personal details
- Born: 1574 Rome, Italy
- Died: 11 Apr 1628 (age 54)

Bernardino Buratti or Buratto (1574–1628) was a Roman Catholic prelate who served as Archbishop of Manfredonia (1623–1628) and Bishop of Vulturara e Montecorvino (1615–1623).

== Biography ==
Bernardino Buratti was born in 1574 in Rome, Italy. On 12 Jan 1615, he was appointed during the papacy of Pope Paul V as Bishop of Vulturara e Montecorvino. On 5 Apr 1615, he was consecrated bishop by Metello Bichi, Cardinal-Priest of Sant'Alessio, with Ulpiano Volpi, Archbishop of Chieti, and Leonardo Roselli, Bishop Emeritus of Vulturara e Montecorvino, serving as co-consecrators. On 9 Jan 1623, he was appointed during the papacy of Pope Gregory XV as Archbishop of Manfredonia. He served as Archbishop of Manfredonia until his death on 11 Apr 1628.

While bishop, he was the principal co-consecrator of Dionisio Martini, Bishop of Nepi e Sutri (1616).

== External links and additional sources ==
- Cheney, David M. "Diocese of Vulturara e Montecorvino". Catholic-Hierarchy.org. (for Chronology of Bishops) ^{[self-published]}
- Chow, Gabriel. "Titular Episcopal See of Vulturara (Italy)". GCatholic.org. (for Chronology of Bishops) ^{[self-published]}
- Cheney, David M. "Archdiocese of Manfredonia-Vieste-San Giovanni Rotondo". Catholic-Hierarchy.org. (for Chronology of Bishops) ^{[self-published]}
- Chow, Gabriel. "Archdiocese of Manfredonia-Vieste-San Giovanni Rotondo (Italy)". GCatholic.org. (for Chronology of Bishops) ^{[self-published]}

Catholic Church titles
Preceded by Paolo Pico	Bishop of Vulturara e Montecorvino; 1615–1623	Succeeded by Franciscus Buratti
Preceded by Giovanni Severini (bishop)	Archbishop of Manfredonia; 1623–1628	Succeeded by André Caracciolo
