= Albert of Montecorvino =

Italian Roman Catholic saint

Saint Albert of Montecorvino

Bishop of Montecorvino
- Born: Normandy
- Died: 1127; Motta Montecorvino, Apulia, Italy
- Venerated in: Roman Catholic Church
- Feast: 5 April

Albert, born in Normandy, was taken to Motta Montecorvino in Apulia, Italy as a child. He later became Bishop there. Albert became blind in later years, but was known for his visions and as a miracle worker.
