= Angelo Cesi (bishop of Todi) =

16th and 17th-century Catholic bishop

Most Reverend Angelo Cesi
- Bishop of Todi
- Church: Catholic Church
- Diocese: Diocese of Todi
- In office: 1566–1606
- Predecessor: Giovanni Andrea Cesi
- Successor: Marcello Lante della Rovere

Orders
- Consecration: 31 March 1566 by Giulio Gentile

Personal details
- Born: 1530 Rome, Italy
- Died: 30 November 1606 (age 76) Todi, Italy

Angelo Cesi (1530 – 1606) was a Roman Catholic prelate who served as Bishop of Todi (1566 – 1606).

Cesi was born in Rome, Italy in 1530, younger brother of Cardinal Pier Donato Cesi. On 15 February 1566, he was appointed at the age of 36 years as Bishop of Todi during the papacy of Pope Pius V. On 31 March 1566, he was consecrated bishop by Giulio Gentile, Bishop of Vulturara e Montecorvino, with Bernardino de Cupis, Bishop of Osimo, and Ippolito Arrivabene, Bishop Emeritus of Hierapetra, serving as co-consecrators. He served as Bishop of Todi for 40 years until his death on 30 November 1606 in Todi, Italy.

While bishop, Cesi was the principal co-consecrator of Ottavio Santacroce, Bishop of Cervia (1576). And Pietro Francesco Montorio, Bishop of Nicastro (1594).

In Todi, the bishop was active in the construction of a number of architectural projects. Cesi was buried in his family's chapel built into the apse of the Todi Cathedral.

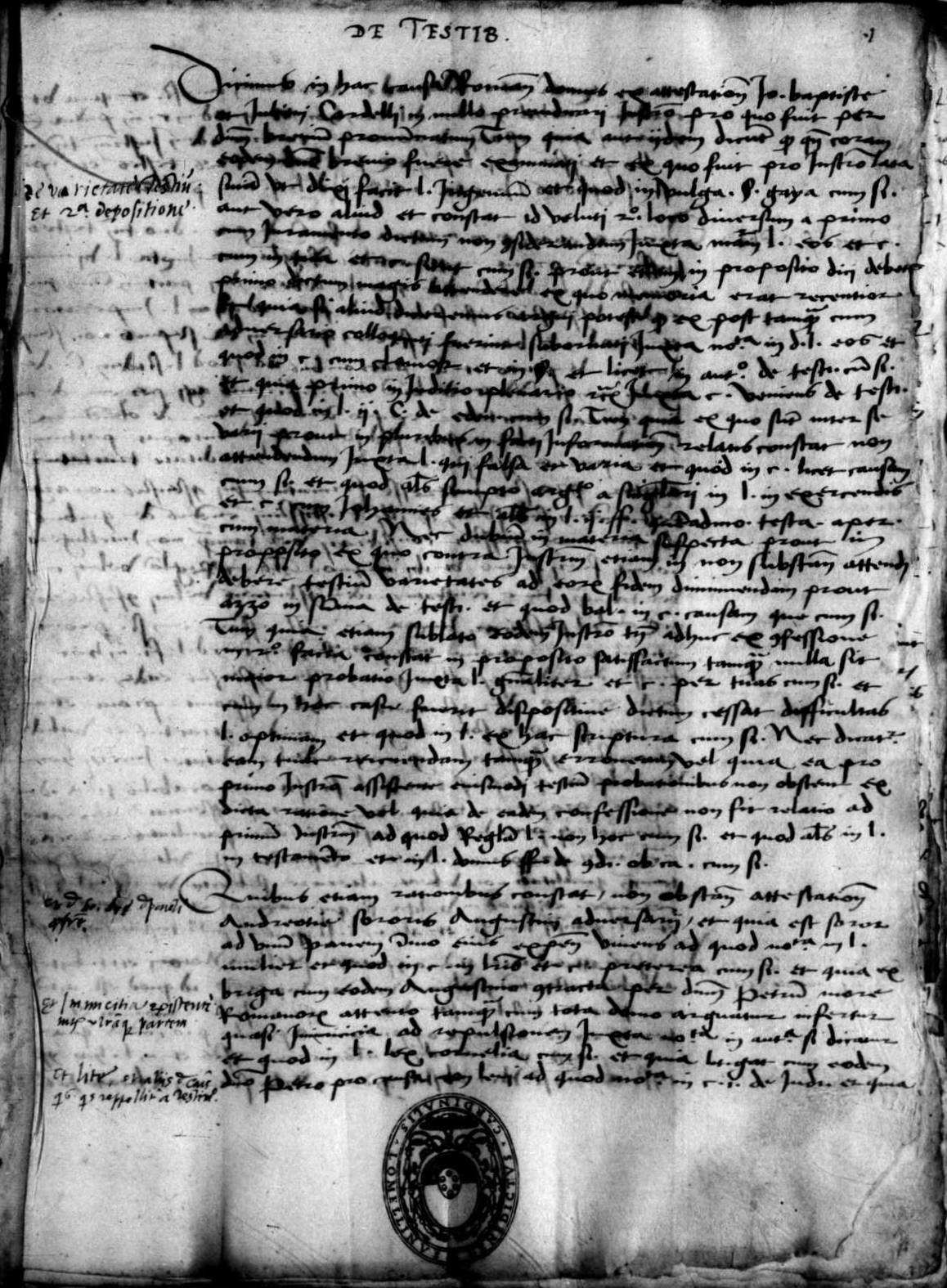
Iuris allegationes, 16th-century manuscript. Biblioteca Ambrosiana, Milan.

== External links and additional sources ==
- Cheney, David M. "Diocese of Todi". Catholic-Hierarchy.org. (for Chronology of Bishops) ^{[self-published]}
- Chow, Gabriel. "Diocese of Todi (Italy)". GCatholic.org. (for Chronology of Bishops) ^{[self-published]}

Catholic Church titles
Preceded by Giovanni Andrea Cesi	Bishop of Todi; 1566–1606	Succeeded by Marcello Lante della Rovere
