= Felice Centini =

17th-century Catholic cardinal

His Eminence Felice Centini
- Cardinal-Bishop of Sabina; Bishop of Macerata e Tolentino
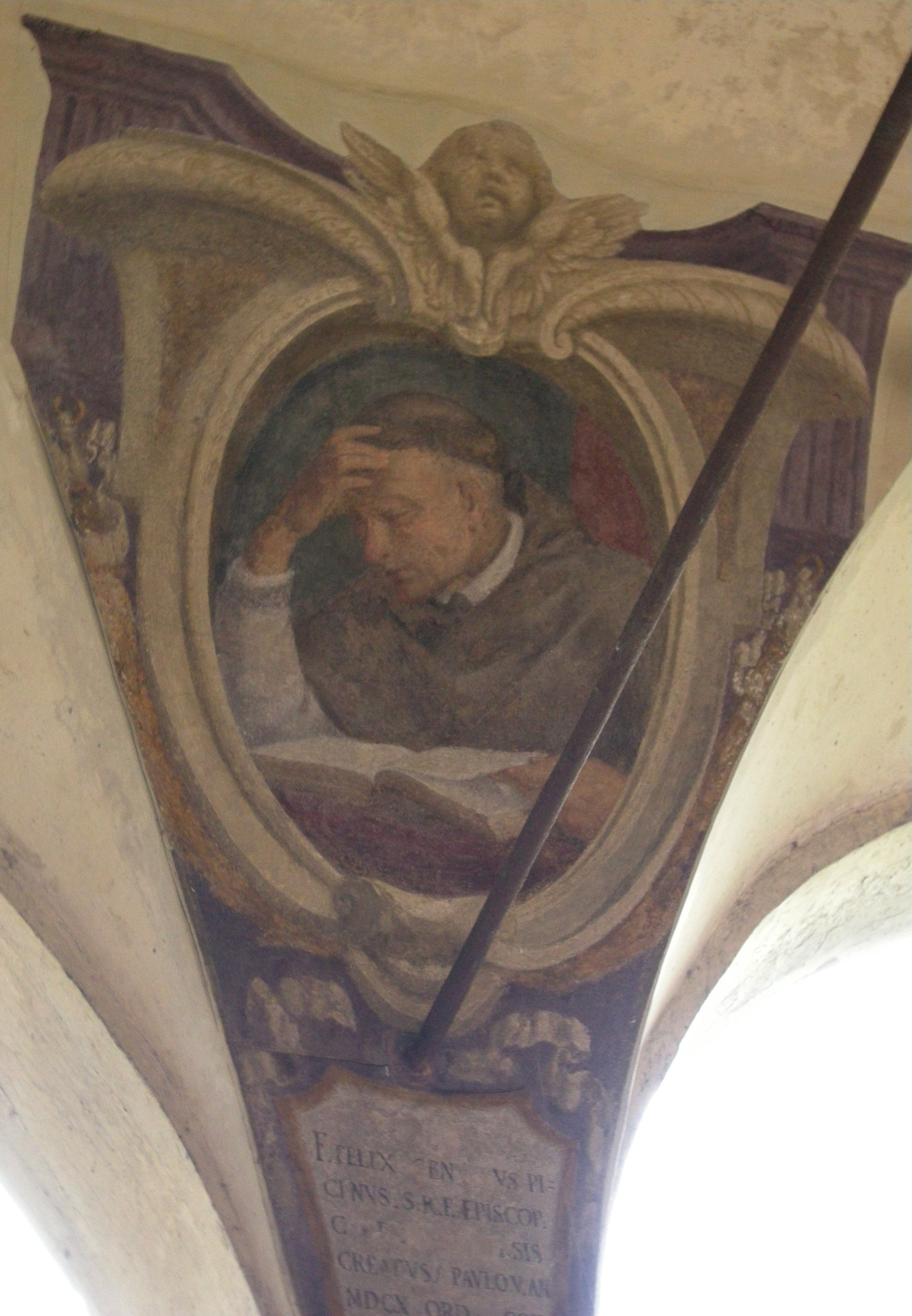
- Church: Catholic Church

Orders
- Consecration: 2 Oct 1611 by Pope Paul V

Personal details
- Born: 1562 Ascoli Piceno, Italy
- Died: 24 Jan 1641 (age 79)

Felice Centini (1562–1641) was a Roman Catholic cardinal.

== Biography ==
On 2 Oct 1611, he was consecrated bishop by Pope Paul V with Giovanni Garzia Mellini, Cardinal-Priest of Santi Quattro Coronati, and Michelangelo Tonti, Bishop of Cesena, serving as co-consecrators.

== Episcopal succession ==
Episcopal succession of Felice Centini

While bishop, he was the principal consecrator of:

- Giovanni Antonio Angrisani, Archbishop of Sorrento (1612);
- Paolo Pico, Bishop of Vulturara e Montecorvino (1613);
- Giovanni Dominico Giaconi, Bishop of Guardialfiera (1617);
- Giovanni Michele de Varolis, Bishop of Cefalonia e Zante (1625); and
- Maurizio Centini, Bishop of Massa Lubrense (1626).

Catholic Church titles
Preceded by Giambattista Leni	Bishop of Mileto; 1611–1613	Succeeded by Virgilio Cappone
Preceded by Bonifazio Bevilacqua Aldobrandini	Cardinal-Priest of San Girolamo dei Croati; 1612–1613	Succeeded by Matteo Priuli (cardinal)
Preceded by Galeazzo Moroni	Bishop of Macerata e Tolentino; 1613–1641	Succeeded by Papirio Silvestri
Preceded by Decio Carafa	Cardinal-Priest of San Lorenzo in Panisperna; 1613–1621	Succeeded by Eitel Friedrich von Hohenzollern-Sigmaringen
Preceded by Bernardo de Rojas y Sandoval	Cardinal-Priest of Sant'Anastasia; 1621–1633	Succeeded by Ulderico Carpegna
Preceded by Scipione Caffarelli-Borghese	Cardinal-Bishop of Sabina; 1633–1641	Succeeded by Francesco Cennini de' Salamandri
