= Roman Catholic Diocese of Montecorvino =

The Diocese of Montecorvino (Latin: Dioecesis Montis Corbini) was a Roman Catholic diocese located between the towns of Motta Montecorvino and Pietramontecorvino, both in the Province of Foggia. In 1433, it was united with the Diocese of Vulturara to form the Diocese of Vulturara e Montecorvino. In 1968 it was restored as the Titular Episcopal See of Montecorvino.
