= Giulio Gentile =

Roman Catholic prelate

Most Reverend Giulio Gentile
- Bishop of Vulturara e Montecorvino
- Church: Catholic Church
- Diocese: Diocese of Vulturara e Montecorvino
- In office: 1552–1572
- Predecessor: Leonardo Benzoni
- Successor: Simone Majolo

Personal details
- Died: 9 January 1572

Giulio Gentile (died 9 January 1572) was a Roman Catholic prelate who served as Bishop of Vulturara e Montecorvino (1552–1572).

== Biography ==
On 27 April 1552, Giulio Gentile was appointed during the papacy of Pope Julius III as Bishop of Vulturara e Montecorvino. He served as Bishop of Vulturara e Montecorvino until his death on 9 January 1572.

While bishop, he was the principal consecrator of Angelo Cesi, Bishop of Todi; and the principal co-consecrator of Giulio Giovio, Coadjutor Bishop of Nocera de' Pagani (1553).

== External links and additional sources ==
- Cheney, David M. "Diocese of Vulturara e Montecorvino". Catholic-Hierarchy.org. (for Chronology of Bishops) ^{[self-published]}
- Chow, Gabriel. "Titular Episcopal See of Vulturara (Italy)". GCatholic.org. (for Chronology of Bishops) ^{[self-published]}

Catholic Church titles
| Preceded by Leonardo Benzoni | Bishop of Vulturara e Montecorvino; 1552–1572 | Succeeded by Simone Majolo |
