= Volturara =

Volturara may refer to:

- Volturara Appula, Italian municipality of the province of Foggia
- Volturara Irpina, Italian municipality of the province of Avellino

== See also ==
- Vulturaria (titular see)
