= Vincenzo Sabbatini =

Most Reverend Vincenzo Sabbatini
- Bishop of Vulturara e Montecorvino
- Church: Catholic Church
- Diocese: Diocese of Vulturara e Montecorvino
- In office: 1519–1526
- Predecessor: Alejandro Geraldini
- Successor: Innocenzo Cibo

Personal details
- Died: 1526

Vincenzo Sabbatini (died 1526) was a Roman Catholic prelate who served as Bishop of Vulturara e Montecorvino (1519–1526).

== Biography ==
On 9 Sep 1519, Vincenzo Sabbatini was appointed during the papacy of Pope Leo X as Bishop of Vulturara e Montecorvino. He served as Bishop of Vulturara e Montecorvino until his death in 1526.

== External links and additional sources ==
- Cheney, David M. "Diocese of Vulturara e Montecorvino". Catholic-Hierarchy.org. (for Chronology of Bishops) ^{[self-published]}
- Chow, Gabriel. "Titular Episcopal See of Vulturara (Italy)". GCatholic.org. (for Chronology of Bishops) ^{[self-published]}

Catholic Church titles
Preceded by Alejandro Geraldini	Bishop of Vulturara e Montecorvino; 1519–1526	Succeeded by Innocenzo Cibo
