= Diocese of Norcia =

Former Latin Catholic diocese in Italy

Cathedral of Norcia, S. Maria Argentea

The Diocese of Norcia was a Latin Church diocese of the Catholic Church; the episcopal see was in Norcia in the modern Perugia Province, Umbria region of central Italy.

== History ==
It is stated that the diocese of Norcia (Nursinus, in Latin) was established in 490, or in 604. Stephanus was certainly bishop of Norcia in 499, when he attended the Roman council in that year. The date of 490 has no authority.

It is stated in the martyrology of S. Felix of Spello that Norcia was destroyed by the Goths and then by the Lombards.

In 603, Pope Gregory I, who was greatly disturbed by reports that priests in the territory of Nursia were cohabiting with women who were not members of the immediate family, sent a letter to his defensor Optatus, ordering him to exhort the persons in question to cease the practice. If they rejected his admonition, Optatus was to take the matter to Chrysanthus, the Bishop of Spoleto, who should correct them himself, or lend his authority to the efforts of Optatus. He also wrote to Gattulus, Romanus, and Wintarit, who had been commended to Optatus, to assist him in correcting matters. Finally, he wrote to Bishop Chrysanthus, instructing him that if any of the offending priests of the territory of Norcia belonging to his diocese were obstinate, he should use canonical authority against them. The pope's language seems to indicate that Norcia was not a diocese in 603, or at least did not have a bishop, but rather was subject to the discipline of the bishop of Spoleto. A bishop of Norcia is found again in 680.

On 12 May 1730, the city of Norcia was practically destroyed by a major earthquake. The campanile of the Basilica of S. Benedetto fell, causing further damage to adjacent buildings. The church of S. Maria Argentea was destroyed, only the lateral walls remaining. The church of S. Giovanni was also ruined, as were the churches and convents of the Augustinians and of the Conventual Franciscans. The college of the Scuole Pie e was rendered unusable. The monasteries of S. Antonio, S. Pace, and Santa Caterina were no longer habitable, and the church and oratory of the Filippini were unusable. In the city alone, there were around 200 dead.

=== Reestablishment of diocese ===
Norcia had two collegiate churches. Santa Maria Argentea had a Chapter presided over by an Archpriest and nine canons. It was a parish church, and the Archpriest had the responsibility for the spiritual care of the parishoners. San Giovanni had a Prior and four canons, and was also a parish church, the Prior being responsible for the parishoners. In 1820 the collegiate chapter was abolished by Pope Pius VII.

The territory of Norcia, then part of the diocese of Spoleto, was removed from that jurisdiction by Pope Pius VII in the bull "Ad Tuendam" of 6 January 1820. It was pointed out that Norcia was geographically separated from Spoleto by high mountains, which made serious difficulties for the bishop of Spoleto in visiting his subjects and caring for their spiritual welfare. The pope therefore intended to re-erect Norcia into a separate diocese with its own bishop. On 28 August 1820, the bishop of Spoleto was transferred to the diocese of Tivoli, making further changes a simpler matter. In compensation, Spoleto was made an archdiocese, though not a metropolitan, and its archbishops were granted the pallium..

The many difficulties in creating a stable income for the new bishop of Norcia (the mensa), and the problems involved in separating benefices of Norcia from those of Spoleto, especially with regard to the canons of the two cathedrals, were handled by the Vicar Capitular of Spoleto, Stefano Scerra, and by Cardinal Giovanni Battista Quarantotti and Annibale della Genga.

On 15 September 1821, Pope Pius VII, in the papal bull "Pervetustam Episcopalium," restored the Diocese of Norcia / Nursinus (Latin), on territory split off again from the Archdiocese of Spoleto.

==== Chapter and cathedral ====
The collegiate church of S. Maria Argentea was chosen to be the new cathedral.

The cathedral was to be staffed and administered by an ecclesiastical corporation called the Chapter. It was to be composed of two dignities, the Archpriest, and the Prior, and thirteen canons, one of whom was designated the Theologus and another the Penitentiary. The personnel were recruited by the disolution of the college of canons of the church of Santa Maria Argentea and their reestablishment as the Chapter of the cathedral. To them were added the members of the collegiate Chapter of S. Giovanni (which was permanently suppressed) as canons of the cathedral Chapter.

Since Norcia had no seminary, the pope ordered that candidates for the priesthood from the restored diocese were to be accommodated in the seminary of Spoleto, without charge.

==== Territorial changes ====
On 26 June 1976, the diocese of Norcia lost one parish to the diocese of Rieti.

The diocese of Nocera lost territory on 19 March 1984 to the Archdiocese of Camerino.

=== Diocesan reorganization ===
The Second Vatican Council (1962–1965), in order to ensure that all Catholics received proper spiritual attention, decreed the reorganization of the diocesan structure of Italy and the consolidation of small and struggling dioceses. It also recommended the abolition of anomalous units such as exempt territorial prelatures.

On 18 February 1984, the Vatican and the Italian State signed a new and revised concordat. Based on the revisions, a set of Normae was issued on 15 November 1984, which was accompanied in the next year, on 3 June 1985, by enabling legislation. According to the agreement, the practice of having one bishop govern two separate dioceses at the same time, aeque personaliter, as was the case with Spoleto e Nursia, was to be abolished. Instead, the Vatican continued consultations which had begun under Pope John XXIII for the merging of small dioceses, especially those with personnel and financial problems, into one combined diocese.

On 27 September 1986, Pope John Paul II approved a decree, which was published by the Congregation of Bishops on 30 September 1986. The dioceses of Spoleto and Norcia were united into one single diocese. Its seat was fixed at Spoleto, where its cathedral remained the cathedral of the united diocese. The former cathedral at Norcia was given the honorary rank of co-cathedral. The name of the diocese was to be «Archidioecesis Spoletana-Nursina».

== Special churches ==
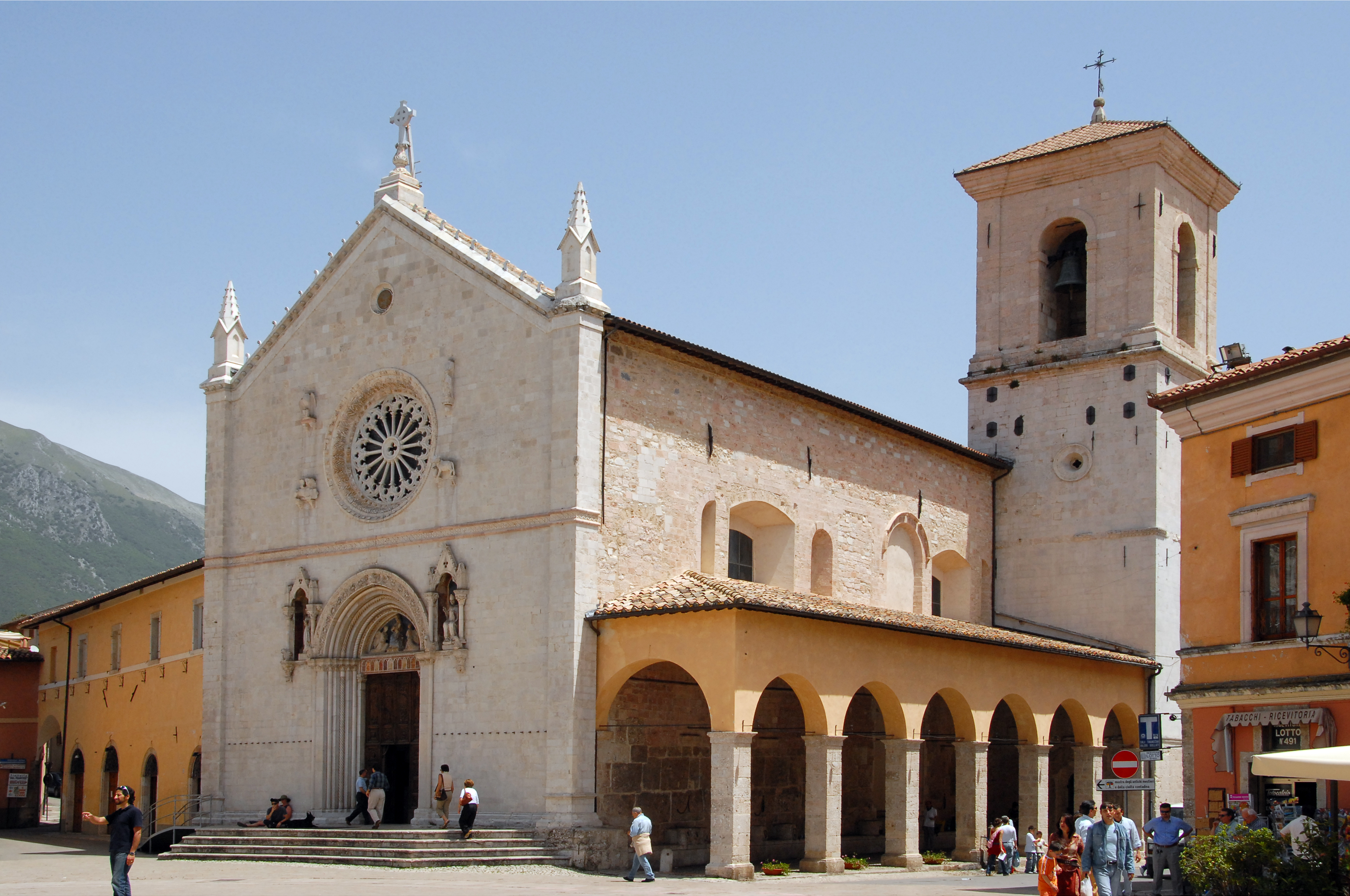
Basilica of S. Benedetto, 2026, after reconstruction

The former Cathedral of Norcia became a Co-Cathedral of the diocese of Spoleto-Norcia, the Concattedrale di S. Maria Argentea.

The Minor Basilica, dedicated to Saint Benedict, Basilica di S. Benedetto, was destroyed by an earthquake on 30 October 2016. It was reconstructed, and opened again in 2025.

== Bishops ==
=== Diocese of Norcia ===
...

- Stephanus (499)

[ Primaevius (594) ]

- Joannes (680)

=== Diocese of Norcia (restored) ===
- Gaetano Bonanni (27 June 1821 – 1843)
- Letterio Turchi (1843 – 1850)
- Raffaele Bacchettoni (1850 – 1880 Retired)
- Domenico Bucchi-Accica (1880 – 1889)
- Mariano Gavasci, O.F.M.Cap. (1890 – 1895)
- Nicola Ranieri, O.F.M. Ref. (1895 – 1905)
- Ercolano Marini (1905 – 1915)
- Vincenzo Migliorelli (1916 – 1927)
- Settimio Peroni (1928 – 1951 retired)
- Ilario Roatta (1951 – 1960)
- Alberto Scola (1960 – 1972)
- Giuliano Agresti (1972 – 1973)
- Ottorino Pietro Alberti (1973 – 1986)

== See also ==
- Archdiocese of Spoleto-Norcia
- List of Catholic dioceses in Italy

== Sources ==
=== Reference works ===
- Ritzler, Remigius; Sefrin, Pirminus (1968). Hierarchia Catholica medii et recentioris aevi (in Latin). Vol. VII (1800–1846). Monasterii: Libreria Regensburgiana.
- Remigius Ritzler; Pirminus Sefrin (1978). Hierarchia catholica Medii et recentioris aevi (in Latin). Vol. VIII (1846–1903). Il Messaggero di S. Antonio.
- Pięta, Zenon (2002). Hierarchia catholica medii et recentioris aevi (in Latin). Vol. IX (1903–1922). Padua: Messagero di San Antonio. ISBN 978-88-250-1000-8.

=== Studies ===
- Cappelletti, Giuseppe (1846). Le chiese d'Italia (in Italian). Vol. quarto (4). Venice: G. Antonelli. pp. 327–385.
- Cappelletti, Giuseppe (1846). Le chiese d'Italia (in Italian). Vol. quinto (5). Venice: G. Antonelli. pp. 45–69.
- Lanzoni, Francesco (1927). Le diocesi d'Italia dalle origini al principio del secolo VII (an. 604). Faenza: F. Lega. (in Italian)
- Patrizi-Forti, Feliciano (1869). Delle memorie storiche di Norcia. (in Italian). Norcia: Miccoci 1869.
- Ughelli, Ferdinando; Coleti, Nicola. (1722). Italia Sacra. Supplementa quaedam, et correctiones ad novem praecedentia volumina, et multiplices indices generales proferentur. Tomus decimus (X). (in Latin) Venice: S. Coleti 1722. Pp. 149-150.

=== External links ===
- Gregory Chow, GCatholic.org, "Diocese of Norcia"
- Gregory Chow, GCatholic.org, Google satellite photo/map - former cathedral
