= Giulio Mastrogiudice =

Italian Catholic bishop (fl 1526 – 1537)

Most Reverend Giulio Mastrogiudice
- Bishop of Vulturara e Montecorvino
- Church: Catholic Church
- Diocese: Diocese of Vulturara e Montecorvino
- In office: 1526–1537
- Predecessor: Innocenzo Cibo
- Successor: Giovanni Salviati

Personal details
- Died: 1537

Giulio Mastrogiudice (died 1537) was a Roman Catholic prelate who served as Bishop of Vulturara e Montecorvino (1526–1537).

== Biography ==
On 21 Nov 1526, Giulio Mastrogiudice was appointed during the papacy of Pope Clement VII as Bishop of Vulturara e Montecorvino. He served as Bishop of Vulturara e Montecorvino until his death in 1537.

== External links and additional sources ==
- Cheney, David M. "Diocese of Vulturara e Montecorvino". Catholic-Hierarchy.org. (for Chronology of Bishops) ^{[self-published]}
- Chow, Gabriel. "Titular Episcopal See of Vulturara (Italy)". GCatholic.org. (for Chronology of Bishops) ^{[self-published]}

Catholic Church titles
Preceded by Innocenzo Cibo	Bishop of Vulturara e Montecorvino; 1526–1537	Succeeded by Giovanni Salviati
