= Leonardo Benzoni =

Most Reverend Leonardo Benzoni
- Bishop of Vulturara e Montecorvino
- Church: Catholic Church
- Diocese: Diocese of Vulturara e Montecorvino
- In office: 1551–1552
- Predecessor: Federico Cesi
- Successor: Giulio Gentile

Personal details
- Died: 24 March 1552

Leonardo Benzoni (died 24 March 1552) was a Roman Catholic prelate who served as Bishop of Vulturara e Montecorvino (1551–1552).

== Biography ==
On 16 Mar 1551, Leonardo Benzoni was appointed during the papacy of Pope Julius III as Bishop of Vulturara e Montecorvino. He served as Bishop of Vulturara e Montecorvino until his death on 24 Mar 1552.

== See also ==
- Catholic Church in Italy

== External links and additional sources ==
- Cheney, David M. "Diocese of Vulturara e Montecorvino". Catholic-Hierarchy.org. (for Chronology of Bishops) ^{[self-published]}
- Chow, Gabriel. "Titular Episcopal See of Vulturara (Italy)". GCatholic.org. (for Chronology of Bishops) ^{[self-published]}

Catholic Church titles
Preceded by Federico Cesi	Bishop of Vulturara e Montecorvino; 1551–1552	Succeeded by Giulio Gentile
