= Leonardus Roselli =

Most Reverend Leonardus Roselli
- Bishop of Vulturara e Montecorvino
- Church: Catholic Church
- Diocese: Diocese of Vulturara e Montecorvino
- In office: 1597–1606
- Predecessor: Simone Majolo
- Successor: Fabritius Cocci

Personal details
- Died: 1606

Leonardus Roselli (died 1606) was a Roman Catholic prelate who served as Bishop of Vulturara e Montecorvino (1597–1606).

== Biography ==
On 10 November 1597, Leonardus Roselli was appointed during the papacy of Pope Clement VIII as Bishop of Vulturara e Montecorvino. He served as Bishop of Vulturara e Montecorvino until he died in1606.

== Episcopal succession ==
While bishop, he was the principal co-consecrator of:

- Valeriano Muti, Bishop of Bitetto (1599);
- Baccio Gherardini, Bishop of Fiesole (1615);
- Fabio Piccolomini, Bishop of Massa Marittima (1615);
- Bernardino Buratti, Bishop of Vulturara e Montecorvino (1615);
- Giovanni dei Gualtieri, Bishop of Sansepolcro (1615);
- François de La Valette Cornusson, Coadjutor Bishop of Vabres (1618); and
- Paolo Faraone, Bishop of Siracusa (1619).

== External links and additional sources ==
- Cheney, David M. "Diocese of Vulturara e Montecorvino". Catholic-Hierarchy.org. (for Chronology of Bishops) ^{[self-published]}
- Chow, Gabriel. "Titular Episcopal See of Vulturara (Italy)". GCatholic.org. (for Chronology of Bishops) ^{[self-published]}

Catholic Church titles
Preceded by Simone Majolo	Bishop of Vulturara e Montecorvino; 1597–1606	Succeeded by Fabritius Cocci
