= Petrus Federici =

Roman Catholic prelate

Most Reverend Petrus Federici
- Bishop of Vulturara e Montecorvino
- Church: Catholic Church
- Diocese: Diocese of Vulturara e Montecorvino
- In office: 1609–1613
- Predecessor: Julius Lana
- Successor: Paolo Pico

Orders
- Consecration: 8 Sep 1609 by Pompeio Arrigoni

Personal details
- Born: 1571 Florence, Italy
- Died: 1613 (age 42)

Pietro Federici or Petrus Federici (1571–1613) was a Catholic prelate who served as Bishop of Vulturara e Montecorvino (1609–1613).

== Biography ==
Petrus Federici was born in Florence, Italy in 1571. On 31 Aug 1609, he was appointed during the papacy of Pope Paul V as Bishop of Vulturara e Montecorvino. On 8 Sep 1609, he was consecrated bishop by Pompeio Arrigoni, Archbishop of Benevento. He served as Bishop of Vulturara e Montecorvino until his death in 1613.

== External links and additional sources ==
- Cheney, David M. "Diocese of Vulturara e Montecorvino". Catholic-Hierarchy.org. (for Chronology of Bishops) ^{[self-published]}
- Chow, Gabriel. "Titular Episcopal See of Vulturara (Italy)". GCatholic.org. (for Chronology of Bishops) ^{[self-published]}

Catholic Church titles
Preceded by Julius Lana	Bishop of Vulturara e Montecorvino; 1609–1613	Succeeded by Paolo Pico
