= Simone Majoli =

Most Reverend Simone Majoli
- Bishop of Vulturara e Montecorvino
- Church: Catholic Church
- Diocese: Diocese of Vulturara e Montecorvino
- In office: 1572–1597
- Predecessor: Giulio Gentile
- Successor: Leonardus Roselli

Personal details
- Died: 9 January 1572

Simone Majoli (1520 – 9 January 1597) was an Italian canon lawyer, bishop and author. His encyclopedic work Dies caniculares (Dog days), covered a wide range of topics in natural history, demonology and other subjects such as werewolves. First published in 1597, it ran to several later editions. He is mentioned in the early history of the explanation of fossils, by Charles Lyell, as a pioneer of volcanic explanations.

He was born in Asti. On 16 Jun 1572, Simone Majoli was appointed during the papacy of Pope Gregory XIII as Bishop of Vulturara e Montecorvino. He served as Bishop of Vulturara e Montecorvino until his death on 1597.

== External links and additional sources ==
- Cheney, David M. "Diocese of Vulturara e Montecorvino". Catholic-Hierarchy.org. (for Chronology of Bishops) ^{[self-published]}
- Chow, Gabriel. "Titular Episcopal See of Vulturara (Italy)". GCatholic.org. (for Chronology of Bishops) ^{[self-published]}

Catholic Church titles
Preceded by Giulio Gentile	Bishop of Vulturara e Montecorvino; 1572–1597	Succeeded by Leonardus Roselli
