= Terentian =

Roman bishop and martyr

Saint Terentian

Martyr and Bishop of Todi
- Died: 118
- Venerated in: Roman Catholic Church, Eastern Orthodox Church
- Canonized: Pre-congregation
- Feast: 1 September

"Terentian" can refer to anything pertaining to the works of Terence.

Terentian(us) (Italian: San Terenziano) (died 118) was Bishop of Todi who was killed during the reign of Hadrian (117–138).

== Biography ==
His legend states that before he was killed, his tongue was cut out. Then he was beheaded. His feast day is September 1.

== Bibliography ==
- Acta Sanctorum: Pien, Jean; Stiltingh, Jean; Van De Velde, Jean; Limpens, Jean (1746). Acta Sanctorum Septembris: Quo dies primus, secundus [et] tertius continentur (in Latin). Antwerp: Apud Bernardum Albertum Vander Plassche. pp. 108–116.
- Lanzoni, Francesco (1927). Le diocesi d'Italia dalle origini al principio del secolo VII (an. 604). Faenza: F. Lega, pp. 425. (in Italian)
- Leonii, Lorenzo (1889). Cronica dei vescovi di Todi (in Italian). Todi: F. Franchi. pp. 9–10.
