= Giovanni Antonio Angrisani =

17th-century Roman Catholic bishop

Most Reverend Giovanni Antonio Angrisani
- Archbishop of Sorrento
- Church: Catholic Church
- Archdiocese: Archdiocese of Sorrento
- In office: 1612–1641
- Predecessor: Girolamo Provenzale
- Successor: Antonio del Pezzo

Orders
- Consecration: 11 Jun 1612 by Felice Centini

Personal details
- Born: 1560 Naples, Italy
- Died: 29 Aug 1641 (age 81)

Giovanni Antonio Angrisani, C.R. (1560–1641) was a Roman Catholic prelate who served as Archbishop of Sorrento (1612–1641).

== Biography ==
Giovanni Antonio Angrisani was born in 1560 in Naples, Italy and ordained a priest in the Congregation of Clerics Regular of the Divine Providence. On 4 Jun 1612, he was appointed during the papacy of Pope Paul V as Archbishop of Sorrento. On 11 Jun 1612, he was consecrated bishop by Felice Centini, Bishop of Mileto, with Giovanni Battista del Tufo, Bishop Emeritus of Acerra, and Paolo de Curtis, Bishop Emeritus of Isernia, serving as co-consecrators. He served as Archbishop of Sorrento until his death on 29 Aug 1641.

While bishop, he was the principal co-consecrator of Pier Luigi Carafa (seniore), Bishop of Tricarico (1624).

== External links and additional sources ==
- Cheney, David M. "Archdiocese of Sorrento–Castellammare di Stabia". Catholic-Hierarchy.org. (for Chronology of Bishops) ^{[self-published]}
- Chow, Gabriel. "Archdiocese of Sorrento–Castellammare di Stabia (Italy)". GCatholic.org. (for Chronology of Bishops) ^{[self-published]}

Catholic Church titles
Preceded by Girolamo Provenzale	Archbishop of Sorrento; 1612–1641	Succeeded by Antonio del Pezzo
