= Volturara Appula =

- Comune
- Comune di Volturara Appula
- Location within Apulia Location within Italy
- Coordinates: 41°30′N 15°3′E
- Country: Italy
- Region: Apulia
- Province: Foggia (FG)

Government
  - Mayor: Vincenzo Zibisco

Area
  - Total: 52 km^{2} (20 sq mi)
- Elevation: 489 m (1,604 ft)

Population (30 June 2022)
  - Total: 380
  - Density: 7.3/km^{2} (19/sq mi)
- Demonym: Volturaresi
- Time zone: UTC+1 (CET)
  - Summer (DST): UTC+2 (CEST)
- Postal code: 71030
- Dialing code: 0881
- Patron saint: St. Luke
- Saint day: 18 October
- Website: Official website

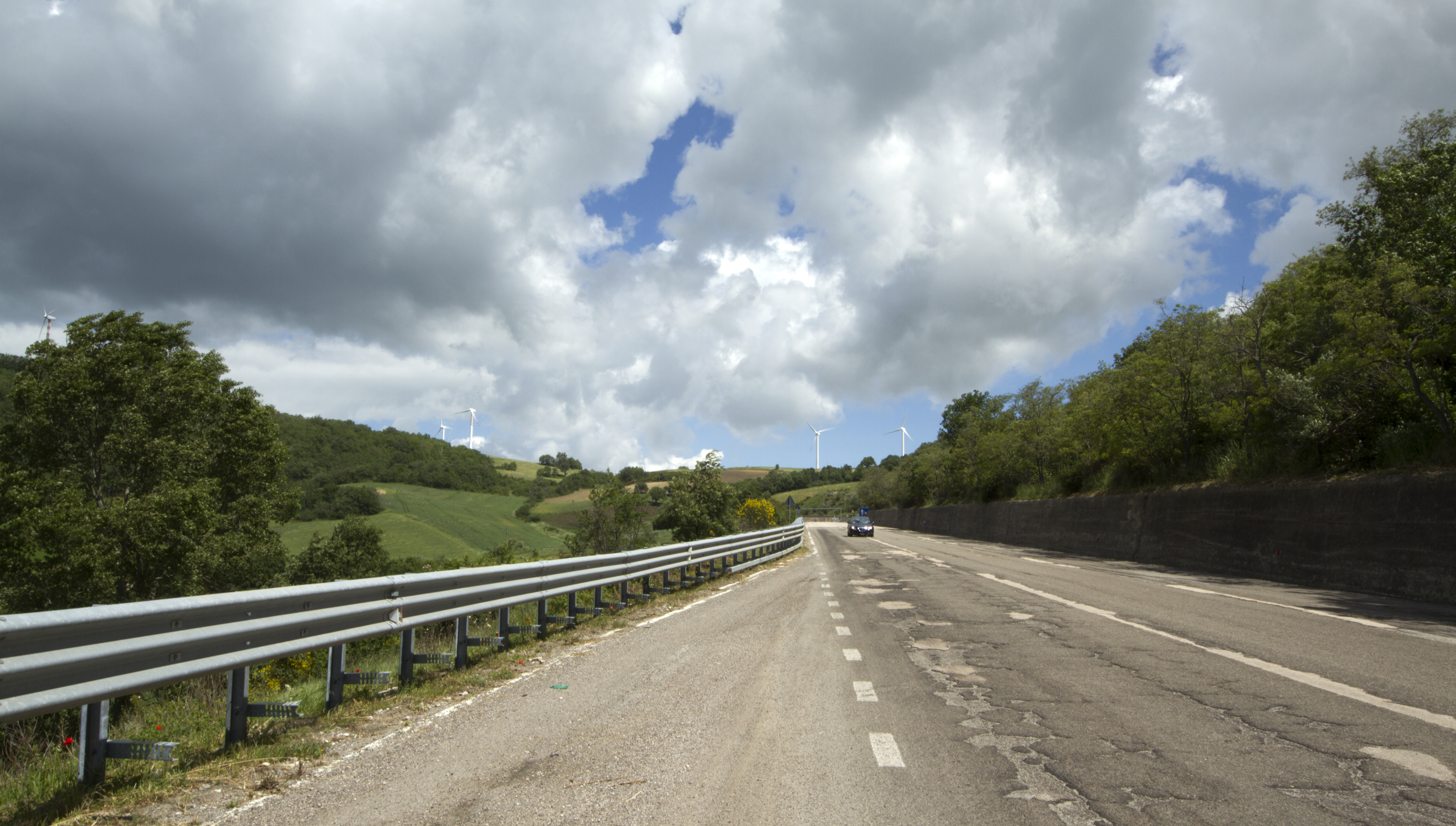
Road near Volturara

Volturara Appula is a town and comune in the province of Foggia in the Apulia region of southeast Italy. Once a flourishing city, the comune now has a population of less than 400.

== History ==
The date of his foundation is not known; the first historical paper citing it, is a document of Pope Giovanni (John) XIII that, in 969 A.D., lists Volturara as a bishopric, depending from Benevento. Vulturaria, as it was previously called, was ruled in various times by its bishops, and by a number of noble families, including a branch of Caracciolos that built the so said 'Dukedom Palace'.

== Main sights ==
The Apulian Romanesque cathedral was built in the 13th century. It has a massive bell-tower with three bells of bronze with a noteworthy percentage of silver. Another church, the 16th-century Santuario di Maria SS. della Sanità (Shrine of Our Lady of Health) was reputedly built by Marquis Bartolomeo Caracciolo in thanksgiving for recovery from illness.

== Bishopric ==
Its bishopric, the Diocese of Vulturara, was united with that of Diocese of Montecorvino to form the Diocese of Vulturara e Montecorvino in 1433. Giuseppe Cappelletti gives detailed information about most of its bishops. In 1818, upon a reorganization of the dioceses within the Kingdom of the Two Sicilies, the diocese ceased to exist as a residential see and its territory became part of the diocese of Lucera. It is now included in the Catholic Church's list of titular sees.

== People ==
Giuseppe Conte, the Prime Minister of Italy in 2018-2021 was born in Volturara, but grew up in San Giovanni Rotondo.
