= Giuseppe Pianetti =

1xth-century Roman Catholic bishop

Most Reverend Giuseppe Pianetti
- Bishop of Todi
- Church: Catholic Church
- Diocese: Diocese of Todi
- In office: 1673–1709
- Predecessor: Pier Maria Bichi
- Successor: Filippo Antonio Gualtieri

Orders
- Ordination: 19 Mar 1665
- Consecration: 30 Jul 1673 by Gasparo Carpegna

Personal details
- Born: 18 Jan 1631 Iesi, Italy
- Died: February 1709 (age 78)

Giuseppe Pianetti (1631–1709) was a Roman Catholic prelate who served as Bishop of Todi (1673–1709).

== Biography ==
Giuseppe Pianetti was born on 18 Jan 1631 in Iesi and ordained a priest on 19 Mar 1665. On 17 Jul 1673, he was appointed during the papacy of Pope Clement X as Bishop of Todi. On 30 Jul 1673, he was consecrated bishop by Gasparo Carpegna, Cardinal-Priest of San Silvestro in Capite, with Stefano Brancaccio, Bishop of Viterbo e Tuscania, and Giannotto Gualterio, Archbishop of Fermo, serving as co-consecrators. He served as Bishop of Todi until his death in February 1709.

== External links and additional sources ==
- Cheney, David M. "Diocese of Todi". Catholic-Hierarchy.org. (for Chronology of Bishops) ^{[self-published]}
- Chow, Gabriel. "Diocese of Todi (Italy)". GCatholic.org. (for Chronology of Bishops) ^{[self-published]}

Catholic Church titles
Preceded by Pier Maria Bichi	Bishop of Todi; 1673–1709	Succeeded by Filippo Antonio Gualtieri
