= Julius Lana =

Most Reverend Julius Lana
- Bishop of Vulturara e Montecorvino
- Church: Catholic Church
- Diocese: Diocese of Vulturara e Montecorvino
- In office: 1606–1609
- Predecessor: Fabritius Cocci
- Successor: Petrus Federici

Orders
- Consecration: 24 Dec 1606 by Ottavio Paravicini

Personal details
- Born: 1561 Brescia, Italy
- Died: 1609 (age 48)

Giulio Lana or Julius Lana (1561 – 1609) was a Roman Catholic prelate who served as Bishop of Vulturara e Montecorvino (1606–1609).

== Biography ==
Julius Lana was born in Brescia, Italy in 1561. On 18 Dec 1606, he was appointed during the papacy of Pope Paul V as Bishop of Vulturara e Montecorvino. On 24 Dec 1606, he was consecrated bishop by Ottavio Paravicini, Cardinal-Priest of Sant'Alessio. He served as Bishop of Vulturara e Montecorvino until his death in 1609.

== External links and additional sources ==
- Cheney, David M. "Diocese of Vulturara e Montecorvino". Catholic-Hierarchy.org. (for Chronology of Bishops) ^{[self-published]}
- Chow, Gabriel. "Titular Episcopal See of Vulturara (Italy)". GCatholic.org. (for Chronology of Bishops) ^{[self-published]}

Catholic Church titles
Preceded by Fabritius Cocci	Bishop of Vulturara e Montecorvino; 1606–1609	Succeeded by Petrus Federici
