= Alessandro Geraldini =

Renaissance humanist scholar

Most Reverend Alessandro Geraldini
- Bishop of Santo Domingo
- Church: Catholic Church
- Diocese: Diocese of Santo Domingo
- In office: 1516–1524
- Predecessor: Francisco Garcia de Padilla
- Successor: Luis de Figueroa
- Previous post: Bishop of Vulturara e Montecorvino (1496-1516)

Orders
- Consecration: 1496

Personal details
- Born: 1455 Amelia, Italy
- Died: March 8, 1524 (age 69) Santo Domingo
- Coat of arms

Alessandro Geraldini (also Gerardini or Gueraldini; 1455 – March 8, 1524) was a Renaissance humanist scholar at the Spanish court of King Ferdinand and Queen Isabella. He is known for his support of Christopher Columbus. He served as tutor to the royal children and later accompanied the Infanta Catharine of Aragon to England, as her confessor. He served as Bishop of Vulturara e Montecorvino (1496–1516); and in 1519, at 64 years of age, he traveled to the Spanish settlements in the New World, and became Bishop of Santo Domingo (1516–1524).

== Biography ==
Geraldini was born in Amelia, in the region of Umbria in Italy. As a young man, he went to Spain, where he served against the Portuguese in 1475/1476. He entered the Church and was entrusted with the education of the princesses of the royal family. While at court, he supported Columbus, who had come to present to the sovereigns of Castile and Aragon his plan for discovering a new road to India and the Far East.

In 1496, he was appointed by the King of Spain and confirmed by Pope Alexander VI as Bishop of Vulturara e Montecorvino. On November 23, 1516, he was nominated by the King of Spain and confirmed by Pope Leo X as Bishop of Santo Domingo and embarked at Seville. Geraldini wrote a great many works on theology, letters, poetry, a biography of Catharine of Aragon, treatises on politics and education, and an important account of his voyage to the Antilles. Geraldini served as Bishop of Santo Domigo until his death on March 8, 1524.

Geraldini attended one of the sessions of the Fifth Council of the Lateran in 1516, likely making him the first cleric from the Western Hemisphere to attend a Roman Catholic Ecumenical Council.

== External links and additional sources ==
- Cheney, David M. "Diocese of Vulturara e Montecorvino". Catholic-Hierarchy.org. (for Chronology of Bishops) ^{[self-published]}
- Chow, Gabriel. "Titular Episcopal See of Vulturara (Italy)". GCatholic.org. (for Chronology of Bishops) ^{[self-published]}
- Cheney, David M. "Archdiocese of Santo Domingo". Catholic-Hierarchy.org. (for Chronology of Bishops) ^{[self-published]}
- Chow, Gabriel. "Metropolitan Archdiocese of Santo Domingo". GCatholic.org. (for Chronology of Bishops) ^{[self-published]}

Religious titles
Preceded by None	Bishop of Vulturara e Montecorvino; 1496-1516	Succeeded by Vincenzo Sabbatini
Preceded by Francisco Garcia de Padilla	Bishop of Santo Domingo; 1516-1524	Succeeded by Luis de Figueroa
