= Guglielmo della Vigna =

Italian Roman Catholic prelate

Most Reverend Guglielmo della Vigna
- Bishop of Todi
- Church: Catholic Church
- Diocese: Diocese of Todi
- In office: 1405–1407
- Predecessor: Antonio Calvi
- Successor: Francesco de Aiello
- Previous post: Bishop of Ancona (1386–1405)

Personal details
- Died: 28 October 1407 Todi, Italy

Guglielmo della Vigna, O.S.B. (died 1407) was a Roman Catholic prelate who served as Bishop of Todi (1405–1407) and Bishop of Ancona (1386–1405).

== Biography ==
Guglielmo della Vigna was ordained a priest in the Order of Saint Benedict. On 6 February 1386, he was appointed during the papacy of Pope Urban VI as Bishop of Ancona. On 12 June 1405, he was appointed during the papacy of Pope Innocent VII as Bishop of Todi. He served as Bishop of Todi until his death on 28 October 1407. While bishop, he was the principal co-consecrator of Antonio Correr, Bishop of Modon (1407).

== External links and additional sources ==
- Cheney, David M. "Diocese of Todi". Catholic-Hierarchy.org. (for Chronology of Bishops) ^{[self-published]}
- Chow, Gabriel. "Diocese of Todi (Italy)". GCatholic.org. (for Chronology of Bishops) ^{[self-published]}

Catholic Church titles
| Preceded by | Bishop of Ancona; 1386–1405 | Succeeded by |
| Preceded by Antonio Calvi | Bishop of Todi; 1405–1407 | Succeeded by Francesco de Aiello |
