= Giovanni Battista del Giudice =

Most Reverend Giovanni Battista del Giudice
- Bishop of Vulturara e Montecorvino
- Church: Catholic Church
- Diocese: Diocese of Vulturara e Montecorvino
- In office: 1537–1542
- Predecessor: Giovanni Salviati
- Successor: Gerolamo Vecciani

Personal details
- Died: 1542

Giovanni Battista del Giudice (died 1542) was a Roman Catholic prelate who served as Bishop of Vulturara e Montecorvino (1537–1542).

== Biography ==
On 23 Jul 1537, Giovanni Battista del Giudice was appointed during the papacy of Pope Paul III as Bishop of Vulturara e Montecorvino. He served as Bishop of Vulturara e Montecorvino until his death in 1542.

== External links and additional sources ==
- Cheney, David M. "Diocese of Vulturara e Montecorvino". Catholic-Hierarchy.org. (for Chronology of Bishops) ^{[self-published]}
- Chow, Gabriel. "Titular Episcopal See of Vulturara (Italy)". GCatholic.org. (for Chronology of Bishops) ^{[self-published]}

Catholic Church titles
Preceded by Giovanni Salviati	Bishop of Vulturara e Montecorvino; 1537–1542	Succeeded by Gerolamo Vecciani
