= Catholic ecumenical councils =

Ecumenical council recognized by the Catholic Church

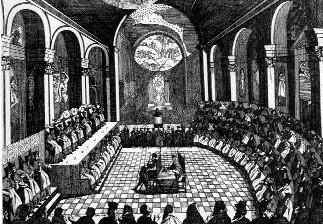
A session of the Council of Trent, from an engraving

According to the Catholic Church, a Church Council is ecumenical ("world-wide") if it is "a solemn congregation of the Catholic bishops of the world at the invitation of the Pope to decide on matters of the Church with him". The wider term "ecumenical council" relates to Church councils recognised by both Eastern and Western Christianity.

In Catholicism, in addition to ecumenical Councils, there are "particular Councils". Current Canon Law recognises two kinds of particular Councils: plenary councils involve the bishops of an episcopal conference (usually a single country), while provincial councils involve the bishops of an ecclesiastical province.

The Catholic Church recognizes as ecumenical 21 councils occurring over a period of some 1900 years. The ecumenical nature of some Councils was disputed for some time but was eventually accepted, for example the First Lateran Council and the Council of Basel. A 1539 book on ecumenical councils by Cardinal Dominicus Jacobazzi excluded them, as did other scholars.

The first few centuries did not know large-scale councils; they were feasible only after Emperor Constantine granted the Church freedom from persecution. The Council of Jerusalem or Apostolic Council, held in Jerusalem around AD 50 and described in Acts of the Apostles chapter 15, is not usually considered to be an "ecumenical Council", although most Christian denominations consider that it expresses a key part of Christian doctrine and moral teaching.

== First four ecumenical councils (4th–5th centuries) ==
These comprised the hierarchs of the undivided Church (i.e. both East and West), and are accepted as authoritative, not only by Catholics, but also by the Eastern Orthodox Church and many Protestant denominations.

=== First Council of Nicaea ===
The First Council of Nicaea (20 May – 25 July? 325) formulated the original Nicene Creed. Most importantly, the council defined the equality of God the Father and Christ, his son. It taught that Jesus was of the same substance as God the Father and not just merely similar. By defining the nature of the divinity of Jesus, the council did not solely rely on the Bible but jointly gave it a binding interpretation. The council issued 20 canons and repudiated Arianism.

=== First Council of Constantinople ===
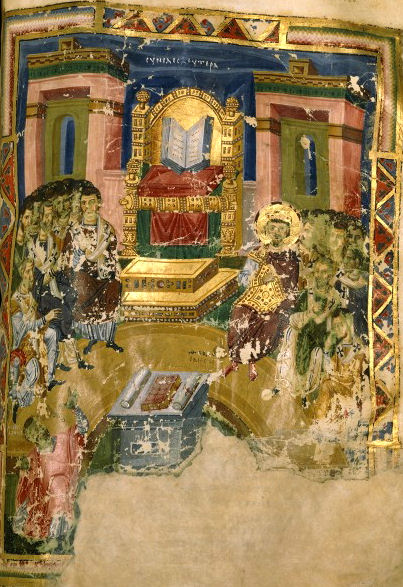
Early manuscript illustration of I Constantinople Homilies of Gregory Nazianzus, Bibliothèque nationale de France (879-882)

The First Council of Constantinople defined in four canons the Nicene Creed, which is still used in the Catholic Church. Most importantly, it defined the divinity of the Holy Spirit. The council met from May until July 381 during the pontificate of Pope Damasus I and issued four canons.

=== Council of Ephesus ===
The Council of Ephesus proclaimed the Virgin Mary as the Theotokos (Greek Η Θεοτόκος, "Mother of God" or "God-bearer"). The council met in seven sessions during the pontificate of Pope Celestine I from 22 June until 17 July 431. It rejected Nestorianism.

=== Council of Chalcedon ===
The Council of Chalcedon defined the two natures (divine and human) of Jesus Christ. "We teach unanimously that the one son, our lord Jesus Christ to be fully God and fully human." It met in 17 sessions from 8 October until November 451 during the pontificate of Pope Leo the Great. It issued 28 canons, the last one defining equality of the bishops of Rome and Constantinople, which was rejected by the papal delegates and Pope Leo the Great.

== Councils of the 6th to 9th centuries ==
=== Second Council of Constantinople ===
The council again dealt with the issue of the two natures of Christ, as monophysitism had spread through Christianity despite the decisions of Chalcedon. The council met from 5 May until 2 June 553, in eight sessions during the pontificate of Pope Vigilius, who was imprisoned during the council by the emperor. It condemned "Three Chapters" of Nestorian writings. Several Catholic provinces refused to accept the Second Council of Constantinople because of the political pressures.

=== Third Council of Constantinople ===
The council repudiated Monothelitism, and reaffirmed that Christ, being both human and divine, had both human and divine wills. It met in sixteen sessions from 7 November 680, until 16 September 681. The council was held during the pontificates of Pope Agatho and Pope Leo II. It also condemned Honorius for holding to Monothelitism.

=== Second Council of Nicaea ===
In 730, the emperor outlawed pictorial presentations of Christ and the saints. The Pope argued against the first iconoclasm and convened in 731 a local council in Rome to no avail. The Second Council of Nicaea discussed and restored the veneration of icons using the Bible and tradition of the Church as arguments. Pictures of Christ, the Blessed Virgin Mary and the Saints were used to stimulate piety and imitation. The council met in eight sessions from 24 September until 23 October 787, during the pontificate of Pope Adrian I. It issued twenty canons. This was the last ecumenical council to be accepted by both Eastern and Western churches.

=== Fourth Council of Constantinople ===
With the coronation of Charlemagne by Pope Leo III in 800, his new title as Patricius Romanorum, and the handing over of the keys to the Tomb of Saint Peter, the papacy had acquired a new protector in the West. This freed the pontiffs to some degree from the power of the emperor in Constantinople, but it also led to a schism, because the emperors and patriarchs of Constantinople interpreted themselves as the true descendants of the Roman Empire dating back to the beginnings of the Church. Pope Nicholas I had refused to recognize Patriarch Photios I of Constantinople, who in turn had attacked the pope as a heretic, because he kept the filioque in the creed, which referred to the Holy Spirit proceeding from God the Father and the Son.

The council was called by Emperor Basil I. The council condemned Photius, who questioned the legality of the papal delegates presiding over the council, and ended the schism. The council met in ten sessions from October 869 to February 870 and issued 27 canons.

== Councils of the High Middle Ages (12th–14th centuries) ==
All of these councils took place in the West and were attended by Western bishops.

=== First Council of the Lateran ===
Successors of Charlemagne insisted increasingly on the right to appoint bishops on their own, which led to the Investiture Controversy with the popes. The Concordat of Worms signed by Pope Calixtus II included a compromise between the two parties, by which the pope alone appoints bishops as spiritual head while the emperor maintains a right to give secular offices and honors. Pope Calixtus invoked the council to ratify this historic agreement. There are few documents and protocols left from the sessions and 25 canons approved. The council met in the Lateran Palace from 18 March to 5 April 1123.

=== Second Council of the Lateran ===
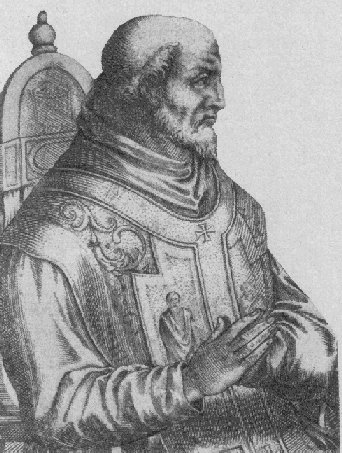
Pope Innocent II

After the death of Pope Honorius II (1124–1130), two popes were elected by two groups of cardinals. Sixteen cardinals elected Pope Innocent II, while others elected antipope Anacletus II who was called the Pope of the Ghetto, in light of his Jewish origins. The council deposed the antipope and his followers. In important decisions regarding the celibacy of Catholic priests, clerical marriages of priests and monks, which up to 1139 were considered illegal, were defined and declared as non-existing and invalid. The council met under Pope Innocent II in April 1139 and issued 30 canons.

=== Third Council of the Lateran ===
The council established the two-thirds majority necessary for the election of a pope. This two-thirds majority existed until Pope John Paul II. His change was reverted to the old two-thirds majority by Pope Benedict XVI in his Moto Proprio, De Aliquibus Mutationibus, from June 11, 2007. Still valid today are the regulations that outlawed simony, and the elevation to Episcopal offices for anyone under thirty. The council also ruled it illegal to sell arms or goods which could assist armaments to Muslim powers. Saracens and Jews were forbidden from keeping Christian slaves. All cathedrals were to appoint teachers for indigent and low-income children. Catharism was condemned as a heresy. This council is well documented: Reports include the saga of an Irish bishop whose income consisted in the milk from three cows. If one of the cows would stop giving milk, the faithful were obliged to donate another animal. The council met in March 1179 in three sessions and issued 27 chapters, which were all approved by Pope Alexander III.

=== Fourth Council of the Lateran ===
The council mandated every Christian in serious sin is to go at least once a year on Easter to confession and to receive the Holy Eucharist. The council formally repeated Catholic teaching, that Christ is present in the Eucharist and thus clarified transubstantiation. It dealt with several heresies without naming names but intended to include the Catharists and several individual Catholic theologians. It made several political rulings as well. It met in only three sessions in November 1215 under Pope Innocent III and issued 70 chapters.

=== First Council of Lyon ===
The council continued the political rulings of the previous council by deposing Frederick II, as German king and as emperor. Frederick was accused of heresy, treason and arresting a ship with about 100 prelates willing to attend a meeting with the pope. Frederick outlawed attendance at the council and blocked access to Lyon from Germany. Therefore, the majority of council fathers originated from Spain, France and Italy. The council met in three sessions from 28 June 1245, and issued 22 chapters all approved by Pope Innocent IV.

=== Second Council of Lyon ===
Pope Gregory X defined three aims for the council: aid to Jerusalem, union with the Greek Orthodox Church and reform of the Catholic Church. The council achieved a short-lived unity with the Greek representatives, who were denounced for this back home by the hierarchy and the emperor. A teaching on purgatory was defined. Papal conclaves were regulated in Ubi periculum, which specified that electors must be locked up during the conclave and, if they could not agree on a pope after eight days, would receive water and bread only. Franciscan, Dominican, and other orders had become controversial in light of their increasing popularity. The council confirmed their privileges. Pope Gregory X approved all 31 chapters, after modifying some of them, thus clearly indicating papal prerogatives. The council met in six sessions from 7 May to 17 July 1274, under his leadership.

=== Council of Vienne ===
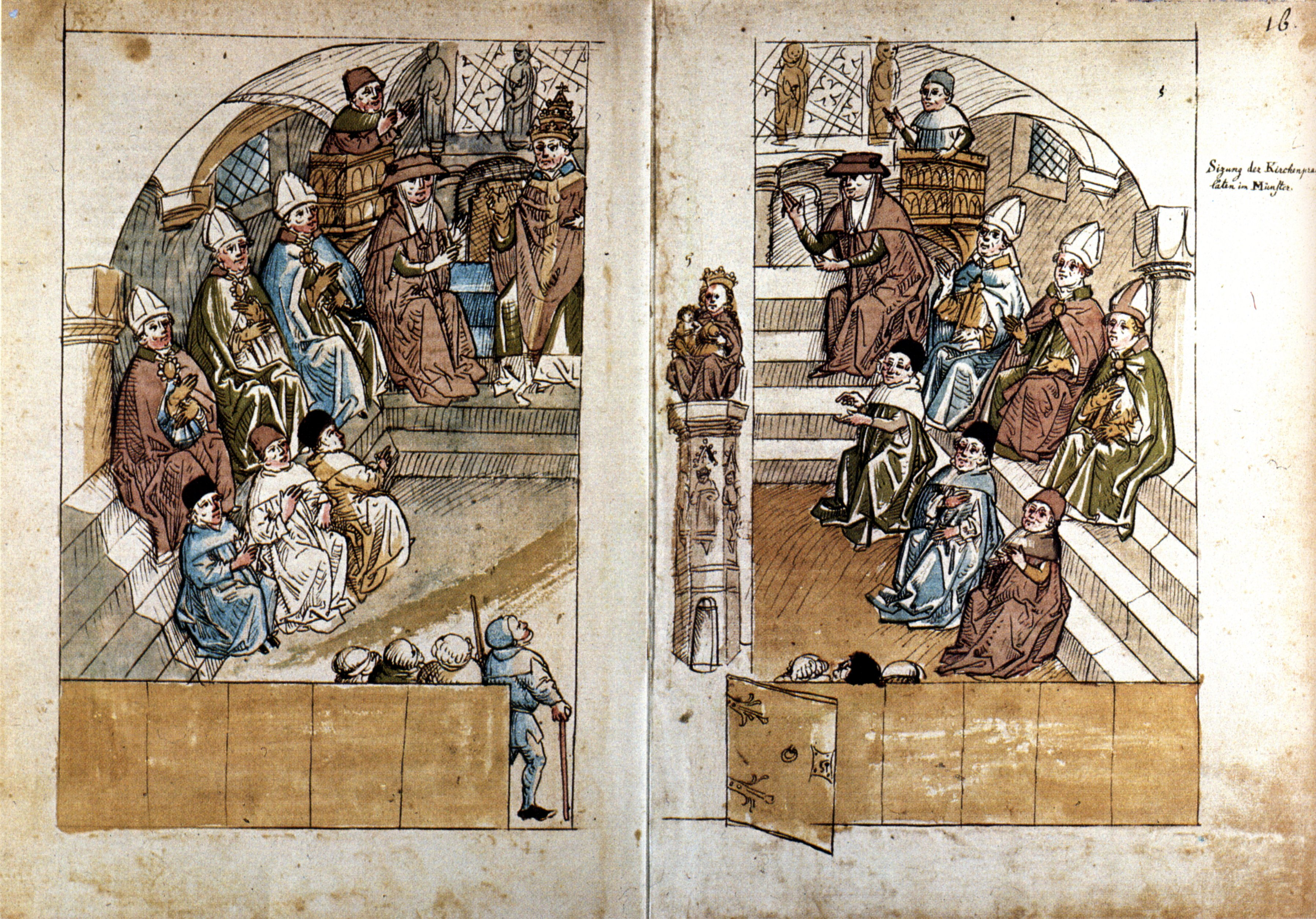
Bishops debating with the pope at the Council of Constance

Pope Clement V solemnly opened the council with a liturgy, which has been repeated since in all Catholic ecumenical councils. He entered the Cathedral in liturgical vestments with a small procession and took his place on the papal throne. Patriarchs, followed by cardinals, archbishops and bishops, were the next in rank. The Pope gave a blessing to the choir, which intoned the Veni Sancte Spiritus. The Pope issued a prayer to the Holy Spirit, the litany of saints was recited and only after additional prayer did the Pope actually address the council and open it formally. He mentioned four topics, the Order of Knights Templar, the regaining of the Holy Land, a reform of public morality and freedom for the Church. Pope Clement had asked the bishops to list all their problems with the Order. The Templars had become an obstacle to many bishops because they could act independently of them in such vital areas as filling parishes and other positions. Many accusations against the Order were not accepted as the Pope ruled that confessions under torture were inadmissible. He withdrew canonical support for the Order but refused to turn over its properties to the French king. The council fathers discussed another crusade, but were convinced instead by Raimundus Lullus that knowledge of foreign languages is the only way to Christianize Muslims and Jews. He successfully proposed the teaching of Greek, Hebrew, and Arabic languages in Catholic universities. With this the council is considered to have begun modern missionary policies. In the three sessions, the council discussed further Franciscan poverty ideals. It met from October 1311 until May 1312.

== Reform Councils (15th–16th centuries) ==
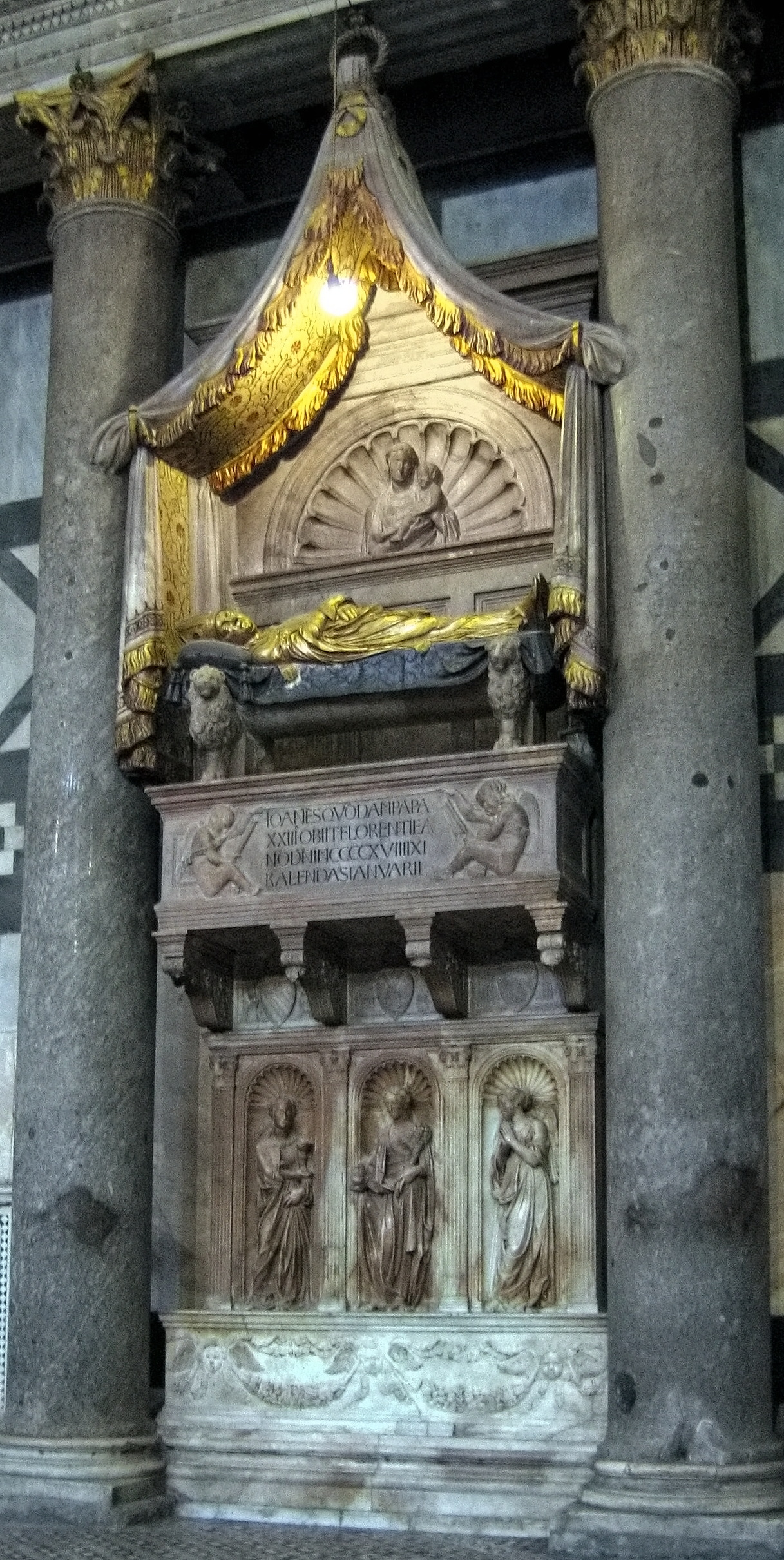
Tomb of antipope John XXIII.

All of these councils were called to reform the Church. The first three were involved in an ongoing debate about the alleged superiority of an ecumenical council over the pope.

=== Council of Constance ===
Before the council there was the Western Schism, with three popes each claiming legitimacy. One of them, John XXIII, called for the council to take place in Constance (Konstanz), Germany, hoping it would secure him additional legitimacy. When opinion in the council moved against him in March 1415, he fled to Schaffhausen and went into hiding in several Black Forest villages such as Saig.

After his flight, the council issued the famous declaration Haec sancta synodus, which declared that popes are below, not above, an ecumenical council. The council deposed all three popes and installed Pope Martin V, who made his peace with John XXIII by installing him as a cardinal. It also provided for future councils to be held, and signed five concordats with the major participating nations.

Reforms did not materialize as hoped for, because the reformers disagreed among themselves. John Hus, a Bohemian reformer, was issued an imperial guarantee for safe conduct to and from the council. However, after he contravened the agreement by saying Mass and preaching in public, he was arrested, tried for heresy, and burned at the stake by the civil authorities in 1415.

The Council of Constance was one of the longest in Church history, meeting in 45 sessions from 4 November 1414 until 22 April 1418. The influx of 15,000 to 20,000 persons into the medieval city of 10,000 created dramatic monetary inflation: the German poet Oswald von Wolkenstein wrote, "Just thinking of Constance, my purse begins to hurt."

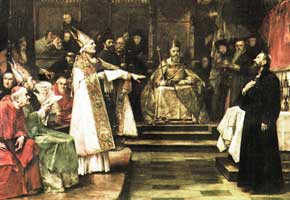
Painting of Jan Hus in the Council of Constance by Václav Brožík

=== Council of Basel-Ferrara-Florence ===
The council continued debate on conciliarism. The papal delegate opened the council in Basel on 23 July 1431, without a single bishop present. When he tried to close it later, bishops insisted on citing the pope to the council, which he refused. The council continued on its own and issued several decrees on Church reform. Most of the participants were theologians; bishops made only ten percent of the eligible voters. The Pope moved the council to Ferrara, where he achieved a major success, when the Greek Orthodox Church agreed to unity with Rome. But conciliarism continued to be the politically correct trend, as "reform" and "council" were seen as inseparable. Formally, the Council of Basel was never closed. The council decreed in 1439 (a short-lived) union with Greek, Armenian, and Jacobite Churches (1442). The council had 25 sessions from July 1431 until April 1442. It met under Pope Eugene IV in Basel, Germany, and Ferrara and Florence, Italy. It was moved to Rome in 1442.

=== Fifth Council of the Lateran ===
The Fifth Council of the Lateran opened under the leadership of the Pope in Rome. It taught that the soul of a human being lives forever (but see the current understanding of eternal life). As previous councils, it condemned heresies stating the opposite without mentioning names. The opening sermon included the sentence: "People must be transformed by holiness not holiness by the people." The issue was reform and numerous small reforms were approved by the council, such as selection of bishops, taxation issues, religious education, training of priests, improved sermons, etc., but the larger issues were not covered and Pope Leo X was not particularly reform-minded. The council condemned as illegal a previous meeting in Pisa. The council met from 1512–1517 in twelve sessions under Pope Julius II and his successor Pope Leo X. This was the first council to have a representative from the New World, Alessandro Geraldini, the Archbishop of Santo Domingo, attend.

=== Council of Trent ===
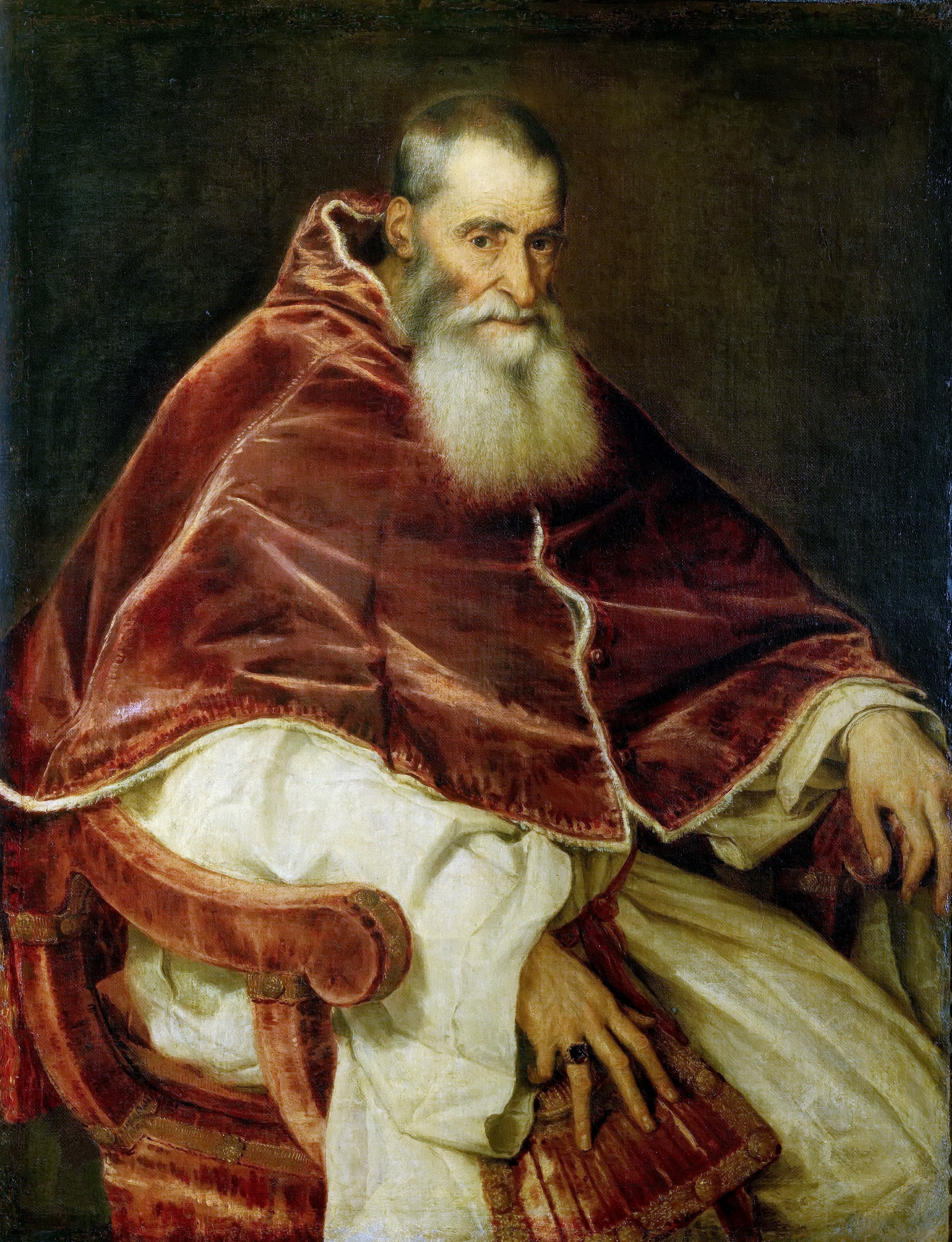
Pope Paul III convoked the Council of Trent

The council issued condemnations on what it defined as Protestant heresies and it defined Church teachings in the areas of Scripture and Tradition, Original Sin, Justification, Sacraments, the Eucharist in Holy Mass and the veneration of saints. It issued numerous reform decrees. By specifying Catholic doctrine on salvation, the sacraments, and the Biblical canon, the council was answering Protestant disputes. The council entrusted to the pope the implementation of its work, as a result of which Pope Pius V issued in 1566 the Roman Catechism, in 1568 a revised Roman Breviary, and in 1570 a revised Roman Missal, thus initiating the Tridentine Mass (from Trent's Latin name Tridentum), and Pope Clement VIII issued in 1592 a revised edition of the Vulgate.

The Council of Trent is considered one of the most successful councils in the history of the Catholic Church, firming up Catholic belief as understood at the time. It convened in Trent between 13 December 1545, and 5 December 1563, in twenty-five sessions for three periods. Council fathers met for the 1st–8th sessions in Trent (1545–1547) and for the 9th–11th sessions in Bologna (1547) during the pontificate of Pope Paul III. Under Pope Julius III, the council met in Trent (1551–1552) for the 12th–16th sessions. Under Pope Pius IV the 17th–25th sessions took place in Trent (1559–1565).

== Councils of the 19th and 20th centuries ==
=== First Vatican Council ===
The council, also known as Vatican I, was convened by Pope Pius IX in 1869 and had to be prematurely interrupted in 1870 because of advancing Italian troops. In the short time, it issued definitions of the Catholic faith, the papacy and papal infallibility. Many issues remained incomplete, such as a definition of the Church and the authority of the bishops. Many French Catholics desired the dogmatization of Papal infallibility and the assumption of Mary in the ecumenical council.

Nine mariological petitions favoured a possible assumption dogma, which however was strongly opposed by some council fathers, especially from Germany. On May 8, the fathers rejected a dogmatization at that time, a decision shared by Pope Pius IX. The concept of co-redemptrix was also discussed but left open. In its support, council fathers highlighted the divine motherhood of Mary and called her the mother of all graces. But by the time of Vatican II it was passed over for reasons given and later avoided because of its ambiguity. The council met in four sessions from 8 December 1869, to 18 July 1870.

=== Second Vatican Council ===
The Second Vatican Council, also known as Vatican II, was convoked by Pope John XXIII and met from 1962 to 1965. Unlike most previous councils, it did not issue any condemnations, as its objective was pastoral. 16 magisterial documents were issued by the Council:

- four constitutions (on restoration of liturgical ritual "according to the pristine norm of the Fathers", on the nature of the Church, on its relation to the modern world, and on promotion of Scripture and Biblical studies);
- nine decrees (the mission activity of the church, the ministry and life of priests, priestly training, the apostolate of the laity, the renewal of religious life, the pastoral office of bishops, ecumenism, Eastern Catholic churches, and media and social communications); and
- three declarations (on Christian education, on non-Christian religions, and on religious liberty).

The general sessions of the council were held in the autumns of four successive years (in four periods) 1962 through 1965. During the other parts of the year special commissions met to review and collate the work of the bishops and to prepare for the next session. Sessions were held in Latin in St. Peter's Basilica, with secrecy kept as to discussions held and opinions expressed. Speeches (called interventions) were limited to ten minutes. Much of the work of the council, though, went on in a variety of other commission meetings (which could be held in other languages), as well as diverse informal meetings and social contacts outside of the council proper.

Those eligible for seats at the council were 2,908 men, referred to as council fathers, including all bishops around the world, as well as many superiors of male religious orders. In the opening session 2,540 took part, making it the largest gathering in any council in church history. (This contrasts with Vatican I, where 737 attended, mostly from Europe.) Attendance varied in later sessions from 2,100 to over 2,300. The Council itself decreed that "all bishops who are members of the episcopal college", i.e. ordained bishops who are in hierarchical communion with the Pope and other bishops, "have the right to be present at an ecumenical council". In addition, a varying number of periti (Latin for "experts") were available for theological consultation—a group that exercised a major influence as the council went forward. Seventeen Orthodox Churches and Protestant denominations sent observers. More than three dozen representatives of other Christian communities were present at the opening session, and the number grew to nearly a hundred by the end of the 4th council session.

== Canon law concerning ecumenical councils ==
The rules and practices concerning ecumenical Councils have varied over the centuries. Many of the earlier Councils were not subject to the rules currently in force, but were accepted as ecumenical due to the practice of the time. Today an ecumenical council can be convoked only by the Pope, but the first eight councils (from the 4th to the 9th century) were convoked by the Christian Roman Emperor. Bishops are always the primary participants at councils, but a variety of other people have attended different Councils: for instance 800 abbots – outnumbering the bishops -- and some secular rulers took part in the Fourth Lateran Council (1215). Today, the Pope decides on the matters to be discussed and the procedure to be followed at an ecumenical council, but at all councils except the last two (Vatican I and II), these were decided by the assembled bishops.

Provisions of the 1983 Code of Canon Law concerning ecumenical councils include the authority of an ecumenical council, the authority of the Pope, and participants. The college of bishops, under and with its head the Pope, is "the subject of supreme and full power over the universal Church", and exercises this power "in a solemn manner in an ecumenical council". The decisions of an ecumenical council are therefore binding on all. The Pope has the sole authority "to convoke an ecumenical council, preside over it personally or through others, transfer, suspend or dissolve a council, and to approve its decrees". It belongs to the Pope to "determine the matters to be treated in a council and establish the order to be observed in a council". The decrees of an ecumenical council do not have obligatory force unless they have been approved by the Pope and promulgated at his order. About its participants, it says: "All the bishops and only the bishops who are members of the college of bishops have the right and duty to take part in an ecumenical council with a deliberative vote." Others "can be called to an ecumenical council by the supreme authority of the Church, to whom it belongs to determine their roles in the council." Participation is limited to these persons, who cannot delegate their voting rights.

== See also ==
- Dicastery for Interreligious Dialogue
- International Council of Christians and Jews, a group engaged in Christian-Jewish dialogue
- John Paul II Center for Interreligious Dialogue
