= Franciscus Buratti =

Most Reverend Franciscus Buratti
- Bishop of Vulturara e Montecorvino
- Church: Catholic Church
- Diocese: Diocese of Vulturara e Montecorvino
- In office: 1623
- Predecessor: Paolo Pico
- Successor: Tommaso Carafa

Orders
- Consecration: 21 May 1623 by Marco Antonio Gozzadini

Personal details
- Born: 1582
- Died: Unknown

Franciscus Buratti (born 1582) was a Roman Catholic prelate who served as Bishop of Vulturara e Montecorvino (1623).

== Biography ==
Franciscus Buratti was born in 1582 and ordained a priest in the Order of Preachers. On 10 May 1623, he was appointed during the papacy of Pope Gregory XV as Bishop of Vulturara e Montecorvino. On 21 May 1623, he was consecrated bishop by Marco Antonio Gozzadini, Cardinal-Priest of Sant'Eusebio, with Virgilio Cappone, Bishop of Mileto, and Alessandro Bosco, Bishop of Gerace, serving as co-consecrators. He was replaced as Bishop of Vulturara e Montecorvino in the same year as his appointment by Tommaso Carafa.

== See also ==
- Catholic Church in Italy

== External links and additional sources ==
- Cheney, David M. "Diocese of Vulturara e Montecorvino". Catholic-Hierarchy.org. (for Chronology of Bishops) ^{[self-published]}
- Chow, Gabriel. "Titular Episcopal See of Vulturara (Italy)". GCatholic.org. (for Chronology of Bishops) ^{[self-published]}

Catholic Church titles
Preceded by Paolo Pico	Bishop of Vulturara e Montecorvino; 1623	Succeeded by Tommaso Carafa
