= Gerolamo Vecciani =

Most Reverend Gerolamo Vecciani
- Bishop of Vulturara e Montecorvino
- Church: Catholic Church
- Diocese: Diocese of Vulturara e Montecorvino
- In office: 1542–1550
- Predecessor: Giovanni Battista del Giudice
- Successor: Federico Cesi

Personal details
- Died: 1550

Gerolamo Vecciani (died 1550) was a Roman Catholic prelate who served as Bishop of Vulturara e Montecorvino (1542–1550).

== Biography ==
On 18 Aug 1542, Gerolamo Vecciani was appointed during the papacy of Pope Paul III as Bishop of Vulturara e Montecorvino. He served as Bishop of Vulturara e Montecorvino until his death in 1550. While bishop, he was the principal co-consecrator of Girolamo Gaddi, Bishop of Cortona (1563).

== External links and additional sources ==
- Cheney, David M. "Diocese of Vulturara e Montecorvino". Catholic-Hierarchy.org. (for Chronology of Bishops) ^{[self-published]}
- Chow, Gabriel. "Titular Episcopal See of Vulturara (Italy)". GCatholic.org. (for Chronology of Bishops) ^{[self-published]}

Catholic Church titles
| Preceded by Giovanni Battista del Giudice | Bishop of Vulturara e Montecorvino; 1542–1550 | Succeeded by Federico Cesi |
