= Archdiocese of Spoleto-Norcia =

Latin Catholic ecclesiastical jurisdiction in Italy

Coordinates: 42°44′N 12°44′E

Archdiocese of Spoleto-Norcia Archidioecesis Spoletana-Nursina

Catholic
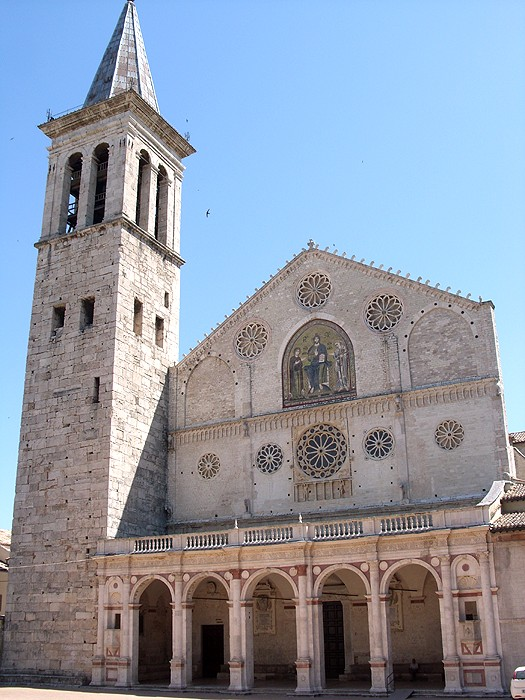
- Spoleto Cathedral

Location
- Country: Italy
- Ecclesiastical province: Immediately exempt to the Holy See

Statistics
- Area: 1,836 km^{2} (709 sq mi)
- Population: Total; Catholics: (as of 2023); 108,300 (est.) ▼; 104,000 (guess) ▲ (94.1%)
- Parishes: 71

Information
- Denomination: Catholic Church
- Sui iuris church: Latin Church
- Rite: Roman Rite
- Established: 1st century
- Cathedral: Cattedrale di S. Maria Assunta (Spoleto)
- Co-cathedral: Concattedrale di S. Maria Argentea (Norcia)
- Secular priests: 52 (diocesan) ▼46 (Religious Orders) ▼8 Permanent Deacons

Current leadership
- Pope: Leo XIV
- Archbishop: Renato Boccardo

Website
- Arcidiocesi di Spoleto Norcia (in Italian)

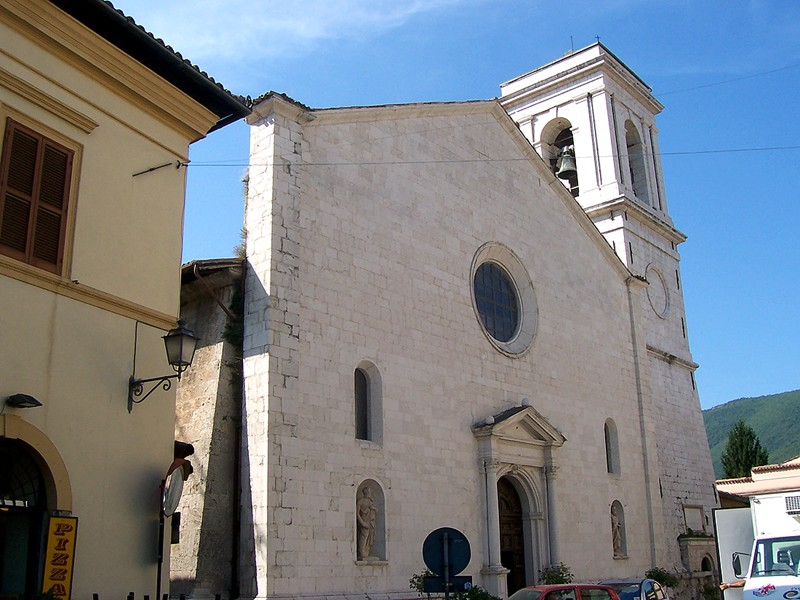
Co-cathedral in Norcia

The Archdiocese of Spoleto-Norcia (Latin: Archidioecesis Spoletana-Nursina) is a Latin Church ecclesiastical territory or archdiocese of the Catholic Church in Italy. Historically, it was the Diocese of Spoleto. Elevated to the status of an archdiocese since 1821, it is a non-metropolitan see and is immediately exempt to the Holy See.

== History ==
=== Civil affairs ===
Spoleto, the Roman Spoletium, surrendered in the Gothic war (537) to the Byzantine general, Constantine; but in 546 it was recovered by Totila, and it was not retaken by the Byzantines until 552, when Narses restored the fortifications. In 572 Spoleto became the seat of a Lombard duke, Faroald.

Under Hildebrand, the Duchy of Spoleto was promised to the Holy See by the King of the Franks, and the duke himself was named by Pope Adrian (773), but the succeeding dukes were named by the Frankish emperors. Winigisus aided Pope Leo III against his enemies.

Duke Lambert distinguished himself in the wars against the Saracens, but disgraced himself by massacres at Rome in 867; he was afterwards deposed (871), then restored (876), but was a second time excommunicated by Pope John VIII. In 883 Guido II of Spoleto united under his sway the entire dukedom, which from this time was called the Duchy of Spoleto and Camerino. After the death of Charles the Fat (888), Guido had himself crowned Roman Emperor and King of Italy under Pope Stephen V (891); Pope Formosus in 892 also crowned his son Lambert II, who succeeded his father in the dukedom, kingdom, and empire.

Alberico I, Duke of Camerino (897), and afterwards of Spoleto, married the notorious Marozia; he was killed by the Romans in 924. His son Alberico II made himself also master of Rome and remained there until the election to the papacy of his son John XII.

During the conflict between the papacy and the Emperor Henry IV, the latter named other dukes of Spoleto. After this the dukedom was in the family of the Werners (Guarnieri) of Urslingen, Margraves of Ancona.

On 28 July 1155, the city of Spoleto was completely destroyed by the Emperor Frederick Barbarossa.

As early as the thirteenth century, and more frequently in the fourteenth, Spoleto was involved in wars with Perugia, Terni, and other cities; in 1324 it was almost destroyed by the Perugians.

In August 1433, the Emperor Sigismund paid a visit to Spoleto, following his coronation in Rome by Pope Eugenius IV on 31 May 1433.

=== Papal affairs ===
The popes maintained at Spoleto a governor, who was often a cardinal. In 1319 the struggle between the Guelphs and Ghibellines tore the city. Cardinal Albornoz favoured the city for the services which it rendered in the restoration of the papal power, and made it independent of Perugia.

At the beginning of the Western Schism, Pietro di Prato succeeded in occupying Spoleto for the antipope Clement VII, but was expelled by Pope Boniface IX. King Ladislaus of Naples, in 1414 endeavoured in vain to make himself master of the city. Pope Eugenius IV named as governor the Abbot of Monte Cassino, Piero Tomacelli, who was tyrannical to such an extent that the people besieged him in his castle, and in 1438 summoned the bands of Piccinino to free them. In 1480 Cardinal Vitelleschi ended the tyranny of Piero and of the Trinci of Foligno.

On 15 January 1820, Spoleto became a metropolitan see, thanks to a bull of Pope Pius VII entitled Pervetustam Episcopalium, and the ancient Diocese of Norcia was revived, with its territory taken from that of Spoleto.

=== Bishops ===
Spoleto venerates as its apostle St. Brictius, who is also venerated in other cities of Umbria and Tuscany. He is said to have been consecrated a bishop by Saint Peter himself, who appeared to him along with an angel when Britius was imprisoned. The legend of his life is full of anachronisms.

Another martyred bishop was St. Saturnius (270).

At the time of Bishop Petrus (573) Spoleto was under Arian rule. It is told that an Arian bishop in Spoleto wished to enter the Church of San Pietro, then the cathedral, by force, but was stricken with blindness.

Bishop Alfonso Visconti (1601) began the construction of the diocesan seminary.

After the death of Cardinal Francesco Locatelli on 13 February 1811, King Napoleon of Italy on 14 April 1813 nominated Canon and Archpriest Antonio de Longo of Florence to be Bishop of Spoleto; the Canons of Spoleto were unwilling to obey the imperial-royal command, and were therefore nearly all exiled. Pope Pius VII was in no position to intervene, since he himself was a prisoner of the Emperor Napoleon at Navona.

=== Chapter and cathedral ===
Bishop Adalbert (1015) laid the foundations of the new cathedral, dedicated to the Virgin Mary and Saint Primianus. He also moved the episcopal residence within the city to the monastery of S. Eufemia.

Having destroyed the city in 1155, in 1185 Frederick Barbarossa presented to the cathedral the so-called Madonna of St. Luke, a Byzantine work with inscriptions of a dialogue between Mary and Jesus.

In 1417, on the death of Bishop Jacopo, who was a partisan of Pope John XXIII, the clergy wished to proceed to the election of a new bishop, but the people prevented them, proclaiming as bishop Nicolò Vivari, the nominee of Pope Gregory XII. Again in 1433 the clergy wished to revive their right of electing a bishop, but the intervention of Pope Eugenius IV prevented them.

In 1691 the cathedral Chapter was composed of two dignities (the Archdeacon and the Prior) and twelve Canons.

The cathedral was struck by lightning on18 March 1846, causing the collapse of the campanile into the roof of the cathedral, destroying a chapel and part of the façade.

=== Synods ===
A diocesan synod was an irregularly held, but important, meeting of the bishop of a diocese and his clergy. Its purpose was (1) to proclaim generally the various decrees already issued by the bishop; (2) to discuss and ratify measures on which the bishop chose to consult with his clergy; (3) to publish statutes and decrees of the diocesan synod, of the provincial synod, and of the Holy See.

In 1468, Cardinal Berardo Eroli (Bishop of Spoleto, 1448–1474) held a diocesan synod, attended by approximately 230 priests.

In 1564, Bishop Flavio Orsini (1562–1581) held a diocesan synod. Bishop Pietro Orsini (1581–1591) held a diocesan synod in Spoleto in 1583, and had the decisions published.

Bishop Lorenzo Castrucci (1617–1655) presided over a diocesan synod in 1621, and published its Constitutions. A diocesan synod took place in 1673.

Bishop Pietro Gaddi (1695–1710) held a diocesan synod on 13–15 September 1706. On 9–11 May 1729, Bishop Pietro Carlo Benedetti (1727–1739) presided at a diocesan synod.

A diocesan synod was held by Archbishop Giovanni de' Conti Sabbioni (1838–1852) on 10–12 May 1842.

== Bishops of Spoleto ==
=== to 1200 ===
...

- Laurence the Illuminator (end of 3rd cent. ?)

...

- Caecilianus (attested c. 353–354)

...

- Achilleus (attested 419)

...

- Spes (first half of 5th cent.)

...

- Amasius (476–489)
- [Meletius (c. 490)]
- Joannes (attested c. 492–496, 499, 501, 502)

...

- Laurentius (552?–563?)

...

- Paulinus (attested c. 558–560)

...

- Petrus (attested 574)

...

- Chrysanthus (attested 597–603)

...

- Adeodatus (attested 649)

...

- Deodatus (attested 777, 781)

...

- Sigualdus (early 9th cent.)

...

- Lupus (attested 967, 968, 1002)
- Adalbertus (attested 1015)

...

- Berardus (attested 1028)

...

- Henricus (attested 1049, 1050, 1059)

...

- Andreas (attested 1065–1069)

[Unknown (1076)]

- Rodulfus (attested 1080)

...

- Salomon (attested 1106–1107)

...

- Henricus (attested c. 1114)

...

- Manvaldus (attested 1146)
- Lotharius (c. 1155)

[Vitechirius (Viterichus) (1173–1178)] intrusus schismatic

- Rasisericus (Transaricus) (attested 1179)

...

- Matteo (1190–1198)

=== from 1200 to 1600 ===
- Benedictus (1199–1228?)
- Nicolaus de Castro Arquato (1228–1236)
- Bartholomaeus Accorombani (1236–1271)
- Thomas de Angelis (1271–1278)
- Rolandus Taverna (1278–1285)
- Paperone de' Papareschi, O.P. (1285–1290)
- Gerardus Pigolotti, O.P. (1290–1295)
- Franciscus, O.Min. (1295–1299)
- Niccolò Alberti, O.P. (1299–1303)
- Joannes (1303–1307)
- Petrus Trinci (1307–1320)
- Bartholomaeus Bardi, O.E.S.A. (1320–1349 ?)

Petrus (1346–1349) Bishop-elect

- Joannes (de Pistorio) (1349–1367)
- Bernardus Bonavalle
- Jacobus de Mutis (1371–1372)
- Gaillard de Pallairaco de Bellovide (1372–1379)
- Ferdinand (1379–1390) (Roman Obedience) Apostolic Administrator
- Lorenzo (1390–1403)
- Carlo, O.S.B. (1403–1404)
- Agostino da Lanzano (27 Feb 1404 – 1410)
- Jacopo Palladini (1410–1417)
- Niccolò Vivari (1410–1419)
- Giacomo del Camplo (del Turco) (1419–1424)
- Giacomo Bucci (1424)
- Lotto Sardi (1427–1445)
- Sagax Conti (1446–1448)
- Berardo Eroli (13 Nov 1448 – 8 Dec 1474 Resigned)
- Constantin Eruli (8 Dec 1474 – 1500 Died).
- Francesco Erulli (1500 – 1540 Died)
- Fabio Vigili (24 Sep 1540 – 1553 Died)
- Fulvio Giulio della Corgna, O.S.Io.Hieros. (22 Mar 1553 – 1555 Resigned)
- Alessandro Farnese (cardinal) (1555 – 16 Dec 1562 Resigned)
- Flavio Orsini (16 Dec 1562 – 16 May 1581 Died)
- Pietro Orsini (bishop) (16 May 1581 – 1591)
- Paolo Sanvitale (26 Apr 1591 – 11 May 1600 Died)

=== from 1600 to 1821 ===
- Cardinal Alfonso Visconti, C.O. (1601–1608)
- Maffeo Barberini (27 Oct 1608 – 17 Jul 1617 Resigned)
- Lorenzo Castrucci (17 Jul 1617 – 1655 Died)
- Cesare Facchinetti (2 Aug 1655 –1672)
- Ludovicus Sciamanna (9 Apr 1673? – 1689 Died)
- Opizio Pallavicini (28 Nov 1689 – 1691)
- Cardinal Marcello Durazzo (1691–1695 Resigned)
- Pietro Gaddi (7 Feb 1695 – Sep 1710 Died)
- Carlo Giacinto Lascaris, O.P. (11 May 1711 – 17 Mar 1727 Died)
- Pietro Carlo Benedetti (17 Mar 1727 Succeeded – Sep 1739 Died)
- Ludovico Ancaiani (1739–1743)
- Paolo Bonavisa (11 Mar 1743 – 21 Jul 1759 Died)
- Vincenzo Acqua (19 Nov 1759 – 31 Mar 1772 Died)
- Francesco Maria Locatelli (1 Jun 1772 – 13 Feb 1811 Died)
- Francesco Canali (26 Sep 1814 –1820)

== Archbishops of Spoleto ==
Elevated: 15 January 1821

- Mario Ancaiani (27 Jun 1821 – 24 Feb 1827 Died)
- Giovanni Maria Mastai-Ferretti (21 May 1827 –1832)
- Ignazio Giovanni Cadolini (17 Dec 1832 – 12 Feb 1838 Appointed, Titular Archbishop of Edessa in Osrhoëne)
- Giovanni de' Conti Sabbioni (12 Feb 1838 – 26 Sep 1852 Died)
- Giovanni Battista Arnaldi (7 Mar 1853 – 28 Feb 1867 Died)
- Domenico Cavallini Spadoni (27 Oct 1871 – 6 Feb 1879 Retired)
- Mariano Elvezio Pagliari (28 Feb 1879 – 5 Feb 1900 Died)
- Domenico Serafini, O.S.B. (19 Apr 1900 – 2 Mar 1912 Appointed, Titular Archbishop of Seleucia Pieria)
- Pietro Pacifici, C.R.S. (28 Aug 1912 – 7 Apr 1934 Died)
- Pietro Tagliapietra (1934 – 1948)
- Raffaele Mario Radossi, O.F.M. Conv. (1948–1967 Retired)
- Ugo Poletti (26 Jun 1967 – 1969)
- Giuliano Agresti (7 Nov 1969 – 1973)
- Ottorino Pietro Alberti (1973 – 1987)
- Antonio Ambrosanio (4 Jan 1988 – 7 Feb 1995 Died)
- Riccardo Fontana (16 Dec 1995 – 16 Jul 2009 Appointed, Archbishop (Personal Title) of Arezzo-Cortona-Sansepolcro)
- Renato Boccardo (16 Jul 2009 – )

== See also ==
- Diocese of Norcia

== Bibliography ==
=== Reference works ===
- Gams, Pius Bonifatius (1873). Series episcoporum Ecclesiae catholicae: quotquot innotuerunt a beato Petro apostolo. Ratisbon: Typis et Sumptibus Georgii Josephi Manz. pp. 727–729. (Use with caution; obsolete)
- Eubel, Conradus, ed. (1913). Hierarchia catholica, Tomus 1 (second ed.). Münster: Libreria Regensbergiana. p. . (in Latin)
- Eubel, Conradus, ed. (1914). Hierarchia catholica, Tomus 2 (second ed.). Münster: Libreria Regensbergiana. p. 152.
- Eubel, Conradus, ed. (1923). Hierarchia catholica, Tomus 3 (second ed.). Münster: Libreria Regensbergiana. pp. .
- Gauchat, Patritius (Patrice) (1935). Hierarchia catholica IV (1592-1667). Münster: Libraria Regensbergiana. p. .
- Ritzler, Remigius; Sefrin, Pirminus (1952). Hierarchia catholica medii et recentis aevi V (1667-1730). Patavii: Messagero di S. Antonio. p. .
- Ritzler, Remigius; Sefrin, Pirminus (1958). Hierarchia catholica medii et recentis aevi VI (1730-1799). Patavii: Messagero di S. Antonio. p. .

=== Studies ===
- Cappelletti, Giuseppe (1846). Le chiese d'Italia (in Italian). Vol. quarto (4). Venice: G. Antonelli. pp. 327–385.
- Kehr, Paul Fridolin (1909). Italia pontificia Vol. IV (Berlin: Weidmann 1909), pp. 5–17. (in Latin)
- Lanzoni, Francesco (1927). Le diocesi d'Italia dalle origini al principio del secolo VII (an. 604). Faenza: F. Lega, pp. 436–446. (in Italian)
- Sansi, Achille (1884). Storia del comune di Spoleto dal secolo XII al XVII: seguita da alcune memorie dei Tempi posteriori (in Italian). Vol. Parte II. Foligno: P. Sgariglia.
- Sansi, Achille (1886). Memorie aggiunte alla storia del comune di Spoleto (in Italian). Foligno: P. Sgariglia. ISBN 978-1-02-229717-3.
- Schwartz, Gerhard (1907). Die Besetzung der Bistümer Reichsitaliens unter den sächsischen und salischen Kaisern: mit den Listen der Bischöfe, 951-1122. Leipzig: B.G. Teubner. pp. 225–227. (in German)
- Serra, Joselita Raspi (1961). La diocesi di Spoleto (in Italian). Spoletp: Centro Italiano Di Studi Sull'alto Medioevo. ISBN 9788879882118.
- Sordini, Giuseppe (1908), Il duomo di Spoleto, delle origini, secondo i documenti Spoleto: Panello % Petrelli. (in Italian)
- Ughelli, Ferdinando; Coleti, Nicolò (1717). Italia sacra: sive De episcopis Italiae et insularum adjacentium (in Latin). Vol. Tomus primus. Venice: apud Sebastianum Coleti. pp. 1250–1273.
