= Roman Catholic Diocese of Vulturara =

The Diocese of Vulturara (Latin: Dioecesis Vulturariensis) was a Roman Catholic diocese located in the town of Vulturara (modern day Volturara Appula) in the province of Foggia in the Apulia region of southeast Italy. It was erected in 1059. In 1433, it was united with the Diocese of Montecorvino to form the Diocese of Vulturara e Montecorvino.
