= Luis de Figueroa =

Spanish Roman Catholic bishop and monk

Luis de Figueroa, OSH (died March 23, 1523) was a Roman Catholic monk who served as co-governor of Santo Domingo (1516–1519) and bishop elect of Santo Domingo but died before his consecration.

== Biography ==
Luis de Figueroa was born in Sevilla, Spain. He was ordained a priest in the Order of Saint Jerome where he served as the prior of the convent of Mejorada del Campo. In April 1516, he was elected as the commissioner of the Indies and tasked by cardinal Francisco Jiménez de Cisneros, regent of Spain, with stopping the abuses committed by the encomenderos as urgently documented by father Bartolomé de las Casas. On November 11, 1515, he left with two other Hieronimyte monks, Bernardino de Manzanedo (prior of the convent of Santa Marta) and Alonso de Santo Domingo (prior of the monastery of San Juan de Ortega) for the New World where they ruled for several years. They consolidated the Indian population into villages in order to better monitor their treatment as well as to facilitate evangelization; however, a smallpox epidemic devastated the population and efforts to prevent abuses by the encomenderos proved futile. The three Hieronimytes returned to Spain defeated. Adviser to the King and treasurer of Spain, Miguel de Pasamonte proposed Figueroa for bishop of the Diocese of Santo Domingo and President of Santo Domingo, which would have made him the highest religious and political dignitary in the Indies. The request was officially granted by Pope Clement VII in 1524 although Luis de Figueroa had already died on March 23, 1523, at the convent of Mejorada. Sebastián Ramírez de Fuenleal was appointed bishop of Santo Domingo in his place.

== See also ==
- Catholic Church in the Dominican Republic

== External links and additional sources ==
- Cheney, David M. "Archdiocese of Santo Domingo". Catholic-Hierarchy.org. (for Chronology of Bishops) ^{[self-published]}
- Chow, Gabriel. "Metropolitan Archdiocese of Santo Domingo". GCatholic.org. (for Chronology of Bishops) ^{[self-published]}

Catholic Church titles
Preceded by Alessandro Geraldini	Bishop Elect of Santo Domingo; 1524	Succeeded by Sebastián Ramírez de Fuenleal
