= Filippo Antonio Gualterio (cardinal) =

His Eminence Filippo Antonio Gualterio
- Cardinal-Priest of Santa Prassede
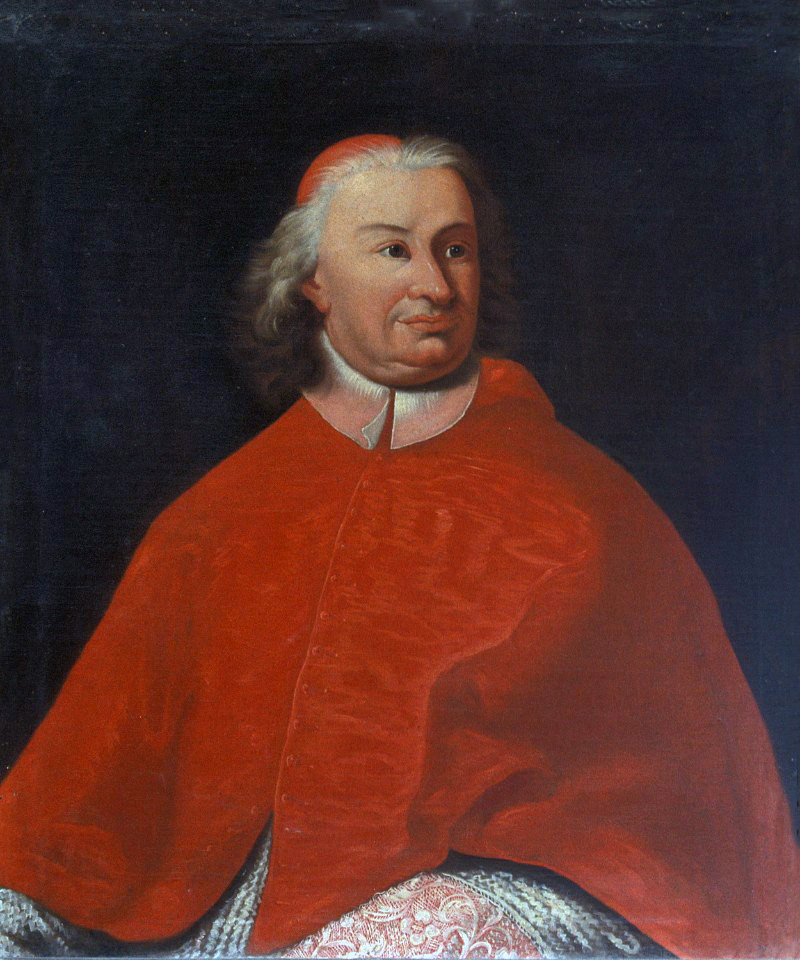
- Portrait.
- Church: Catholic Church
- Appointed: 31 July 1726
- Term ended: 21 April 1728
- Predecessor: Giuseppe Sacripante
- Successor: Luigi Pico della Mirandola
- Previous posts: Titular Archbishop of Athenæ (1700–01); Apostolic Nuncio to France (1700–01); Bishop of Imola (1701–09); Cardinal-Priest of San Crisogono (1708–25); Bishop of Todi (1709–14); Camerlengo of the College of Cardinals (1712–13); Cardinal-Priest of Santa Cecilia (1725–26)

Orders
- Consecration: 16 May 1700 by François de Mailly
- Created cardinal: 17 May 1706 by Pope Clement XI
- Rank: Cardinal-Priest

Personal details
- Born: Filippo Antonio Gualterio; 24 March 1660 Fermo, Papal States
- Died: 21 April 1728 (aged 68) Rome, Papal States
- Buried: Orvieto Cathedral
- Parents: Stanislao Gualterio; Anna Maria Cioli

Filippo Antonio Gualterio (24 March 1660 – 21 April 1728) was made a papal nuncio to France (1700–1706) and a cardinal of the Catholic Church from 1706.

== Life ==
Descended from the ancient Gualterio family of Orvieto related to Pope Innocent X, he was the uncle of Cardinal Luigi Gualterio.

Born at Fermo, whose archdiocese was governed by his grand-uncle Cardinal Carlo Gualterio, he was the eldest of 17 children of Stanislao Gualterio, Gonfaloniere of Orvieto, and Anna Maria Cioli, noble of Todi. He received doctorates at the University of Fermo in philosophy, theology, and utroque iure, both canon and civil law.

== In France ==
Beginning in 1685, when he was made Governor of San Severino, he served in various governorates of the Papal States until he was sent as Vice-legate to Avignon (1696–1700), where he carried himself so well he was made papal nuncio to the court of King Louis XIV of France in April 1700, in preparation for which he was made titular archbishop of Atena at the end of March. On 16 May 1700, he was consecrated bishop by François de Mailly, Archbishop of Arles. Another member of his family, Sebastiano Gualterio, had already served as nuncio to France in 1554.

An avid collector, in 1715 he became an honorary member of the Académie des inscriptions et belles-lettres, and was a regular visitor to François Roger de Gaignières. He amassed a library of 10,000 to 12,000 rare volumes, which was purchased by Cardinal Corsini, who incorporated it into his own, and who, having become Pope under the name of Clement XII (1730), made it accessible to the public. He befriended Louis de Rouvroy, duc de Saint-Simonand, according to Boislisle, they maintained an encrypted correspondence that has now disappeared, probably destroyed at the Duke's request. Many of his letters are preserved in the British Library (London).

During his nunciature he established ties with prominent members of the European nobility and, in particular, with the Duc of Saint-Simon, who often mentions him in the Memoirs. In recognition of the esteem he gained from King Louis XIV, he was named the commendatory abbot of the Abbey of Saint-Remy in Rheims (1710) and of the Abbey of Saint-Victor in Paris (1713 or 1714).

Gualterio was transferred to the bishopric of Imola in 1701, with the personal title of archbishop. He was recalled from Paris to be created cardinal in the consistory of 17 May 1706 and sent as legate to Romagna, 25 June. He returned from his nunciature in Paris and arrived in Imola in December 1706, but did not stay long.

He was cardinal-priest of St. Chrysogonus in 1708, then of Santa Cecilia in Trastevere in 1724, and finally of Santa Prassede in 1726.

Gualterio was nominated Cardinal Protector of Scotland, as of 1706, and England, as of 1717, he was one of the closest advisers to the Stuart Pretender, James Stuart, the would-be James VIII of Scotland, who conferred upon his brother Giovanni Battista the Jacobite title of Earl of Dundee.

In 1709 Gualterio was transferred to the Diocese of Todi, with the personal title of archbishop, later resigning the see in favour of his brother, Ludovico Anselmo Gualterio, 5 December 1714. He participated in the Papal conclave, 1721, which elected Pope Innocent XIII and in the conclave of 1724, which elected Pope Benedict XIII.

Founder of a monumental library, now part of the Accademia dei Lincei, and of a vast collection of art, which after his death was partly acquired by Hans Sloane and is now at the British Museum.

Gualterio's remains were transferred to the tomb of his family in the Chapel of the Madonna di San Brizio in the Cathedral of Orvieto, alongside his uncle Gianotto Gualterio, his great-uncle Carlo, both archbishops of Fermo, and his brother Ludovico Anselmo, bishop of Todi. The Gualterio papers are conserved at the British Library.

Catholic Church titles
Preceded by Marcello d'Aste	Titular Archbishop of Athenae; 1700–1706	Succeeded by Giuseppe Vallemani
Preceded by Daniello Marco Delfino	Apostolic Nuncio to France; 1700–1706	Succeeded by Agostino Cusani
Preceded by Taddeo Luigi dal Verme	Archbishop (Personal Title) of Imola; 1701–1714	Succeeded by Ulisse Giuseppe Gozzadini
Preceded by Fabrizio Spada	Cardinal-Priest of San Crisogono; 1708–1724	Succeeded by Prospero Marefoschi
Preceded by Giuseppe Pianetti	Bishop of Todi; 1709–1714	Succeeded by Ludovico Anselmo Gualtieri
Preceded by Francesco Acquaviva d'Aragona	Cardinal-Priest of Santa Cecilia; 1724–1726	Succeeded by Cornelio Bentivoglio
Preceded by Giuseppe Sacripante	Cardinal-Priest of Santa Prassede; 1726–1728	Succeeded by Lodovico Pico Della Mirandola
