= Fabritius Cocci =

Prelate and bishop

Most Reverend Fabritius Cocci
- Bishop of Vulturara e Montecorvino
- Church: Catholic Church
- Diocese: Diocese of Vulturara e Montecorvino
- In office: 1606
- Predecessor: Leonardus Roselli
- Successor: Julius Lana

Personal details
- Died: Oct 1606

Fabritius Cocci (died October, 1606) was a Roman Catholic prelate who served as Bishop of Vulturara e Montecorvino (1606).

== Biography ==
On 27 Feb 1606, Fabritius Cocci was appointed during the papacy of Pope Paul V as Bishop of Vulturara e Montecorvino. He served as Bishop of Vulturara e Montecorvino until his death in Oct 1606.

== See also ==
- Catholic Church in Italy

== External links and additional sources ==
- Cheney, David M. "Diocese of Vulturara e Montecorvino". Catholic-Hierarchy.org. (for Chronology of Bishops) ^{[self-published]}
- Chow, Gabriel. "Titular Episcopal See of Vulturara (Italy)". GCatholic.org. (for Chronology of Bishops) ^{[self-published]}

Catholic Church titles
Preceded by Leonardus Roselli	Bishop of Vulturara e Montecorvino; 1606	Succeeded by Julius Lana
