= Bartolomeo Aglioni =

Italian Roman Catholic prelate

Most Reverend Bartolomeo Aglioni
- Bishop of Todi
- Church: Catholic Church
- Diocese: Diocese of Todi
- In office: 1435–1472
- Predecessor: Francesco de Aiello
- Successor: Constantin Eruli

Personal details
- Died: 4 January 1472 Todi, Italy

Bartolomeo Aglioni (died 1472) was a Roman Catholic prelate who served as Bishop of Todi (1435–1472).

== Biography ==
On 12 December 1435, Bartolomeo Aglioni was appointed during the papacy of Pope Eugene IV as Bishop of Todi. He served as Bishop of Todi until his death on 4 January 1472. While bishop, he was the principal consecrator of Francesco Oddi de Tuderto, Bishop of Assisi (1445).

== External links and additional sources ==
- Cheney, David M. "Diocese of Todi". Catholic-Hierarchy.org. (for Chronology of Bishops) ^{[self-published]}
- Chow, Gabriel. "Diocese of Todi (Italy)". GCatholic.org. (for Chronology of Bishops) ^{[self-published]}

Catholic Church titles
Preceded by Francesco de Aiello	Bishop of Todi; 1435–1472	Succeeded by Constantin Eruli
