= Paolo Pico =

Most Reverend Paolo Pico
- Bishop of Vulturara e Montecorvino
- Church: Catholic Church
- Diocese: Diocese of Vulturara e Montecorvino
- In office: 1613–1614
- Predecessor: Petrus Federici
- Successor: Bernardino Buratti

Orders
- Consecration: Felice Centini by 15 Sep 1613

Personal details
- Born: 1563 Burgi San Sepulchri, Italy
- Died: 1614 (age 51)

Paolo Pico (1563 – 1614) was a Roman Catholic prelate who served as Bishop of Vulturara e Montecorvino (1613–1614).

== Biography ==
Paolo Pico was born in Burgi San Sepulchri, Italy in 1563 and ordained a priest in the Order of Preachers. On 15 Jul 1613, he was appointed during the papacy of Pope Paul V as Bishop of Vulturara e Montecorvino. On 15 Sep 1613, he was consecrated bishop by Felice Centini, Bishop of Mileto, with Antonio d'Aquino, Bishop of Sarno, and Sigismondo Gambacorta, Bishop of Telese o Cerreto Sannita, serving as co-consecrators. He served as Bishop of Vulturara e Montecorvino until his death in 1614.

== External links and additional sources ==
- Cheney, David M. "Diocese of Vulturara e Montecorvino". Catholic-Hierarchy.org. (for Chronology of Bishops) ^{[self-published]}
- Chow, Gabriel. "Titular Episcopal See of Vulturara (Italy)". GCatholic.org. (for Chronology of Bishops) ^{[self-published]}

Catholic Church titles
Preceded by Petrus Federici	Bishop of Vulturara e Montecorvino; 1613–1614	Succeeded by Bernardino Buratti
