= Francesco Eroli =

Bishop of Spoleto

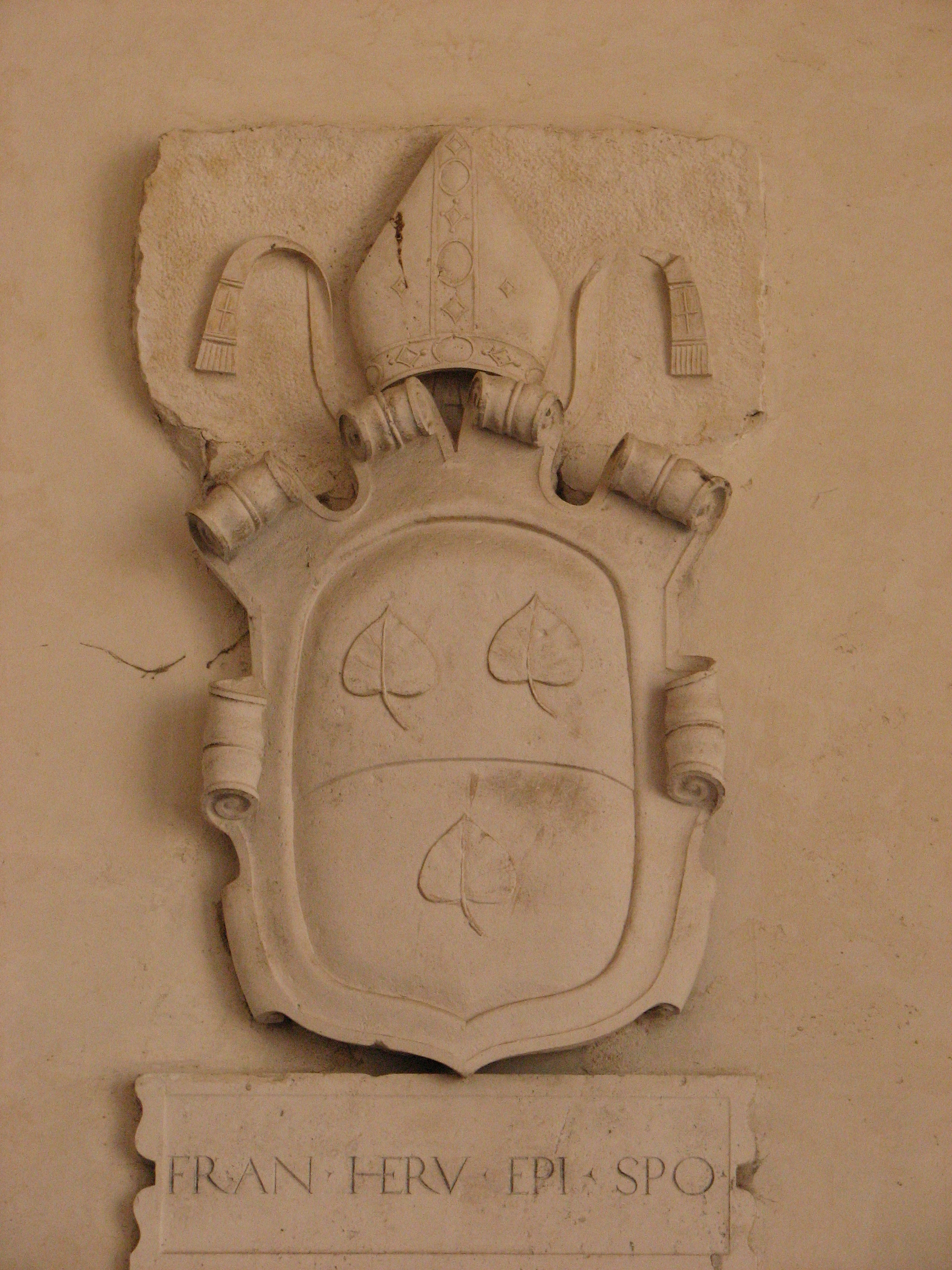
Eroli's coat of arms

Francesco Eroli (died 1540) was Bishop of Spoleto from 1500 to 1540. He opposed what he saw as the invasion of his rights by the abbot of Spoletto. He excommunicated the abbot of Spoletto when the abbot defied him, but was overturned by the pope. He was succeeded by Fabio Agatidio Vigili in September 1540.

== External links and additional sources ==
- Cheney, David M. "Archdiocese of Spoleto-Norcia". Catholic-Hierarchy.org. (for Chronology of Bishops) ^{[self-published]}
- Chow, Gabriel. "Archdiocese of Spoleto-Norcia". GCatholic.org. (Chronology of Bishops) ^{[self-published]}
