= Roman Catholic Diocese of Vulturara e Montecorvino =

The Diocese of Vulturara e Montecorvino (Latin: Dioecesis Vulturariensis et Montis Corbini) was a Roman Catholic diocese located in the city of Volturara Appula in the province of Foggia in the Apulia region of southeast Italy. The bishopric, which already existed in the 10th century, was united with that of Diocese of Montecorvino in 1433. Giuseppe Cappelletti gives detailed information about most of its bishops. In 1818, as part of a reorganization of the dioceses within the Kingdom of the Two Sicilies, the diocese ceased to exist as a residential see and its territory became part of the diocese of Lucera. It is now included in the Catholic Church's list of titular sees.

== History ==
- 1059: Established as Diocese of Vulturara
- 1433: Renamed as Diocese of Vulturara e Montecorvino (gained territory from the suppressed Diocese of Montecorvino)
- 1818 June 27: Suppressed to the Diocese of Lucera
- 1968: Restored as Titular Episcopal See of Vulturara
- 1968: Restored as Titular Episcopal See of Montecorvino

== Ordinaries ==
=== Diocese of Vulturara e Montecorvino ===
1433: Formed from the union of the Diocese of Montecorvino and the Diocese of Vulturara
Latin name: Vulturariensis et Montis Corbini
Metropolitan: Archdiocese of Benevento

- Alejandro Geraldini (1496–1516 Appointed, Bishop of Santo Domingo)
- Vincenzo Sabbatini (1519–1526 Died)
- Innocenzo Cibo (Cybo) (1526–1526 Resigned)
- Giulio Mastrogiudice (1526–1537 Died)
- Giovanni Salviati (1530–1532 Resigned)
- Giovanni Battista del Giudice (1537–1542 Died)
- Gerolamo Vecciani (1542–1550 Resigned)
- Federico Cesi (1550–1551 Resigned)
- Leonardo Benzoni (1551–1552 Died)
- Giulio Gentile (1552–1572 Died)
- Simone Majolo (1572–1597 Resigned)
- Leonardus Roselli (1597–1606 Resigned)
- Fabritius Cocci (1606–1606 Died)
- Julius Lana (1606–1609 Died)
- Petrus Federici (1609–1613 Died)
- Paolo Pico, O.P. (1613–1614 Died)
- Bernardino Buratti (1615–1623 Appointed, Archbishop of Manfredonia)
- Franciscus Buratti, O.P. (1623)
- Tommaso Carafa (1623–1637 Resigned)
- Maximilianus Raguzzi (1637–1639 Died)
- Bartolomeo Gessi (1639–1642 Died)
- Bonaventura D'Avalos, O.S.A. (1643–1654 Appointed, Bishop of Nocera de' Pagani)
- Marco Antonio Pisanelli (1654–1675 Appointed, Bishop of Sora)
- Domenico Sorrentino (bishop) (1676–1708 Died)
- Imperialis Pedicini (1718–1724 Died)
- Domenico Rossi (1724–1734 Died)
- Dominico Laymo (1734–1760 Died)
- Giovanni Coccoli (1760–1795 Died)
- Nicola Martini (1798–1808 Died)

1818 Suppressed to the Diocese of Lucera
