= Diocese of Todi =

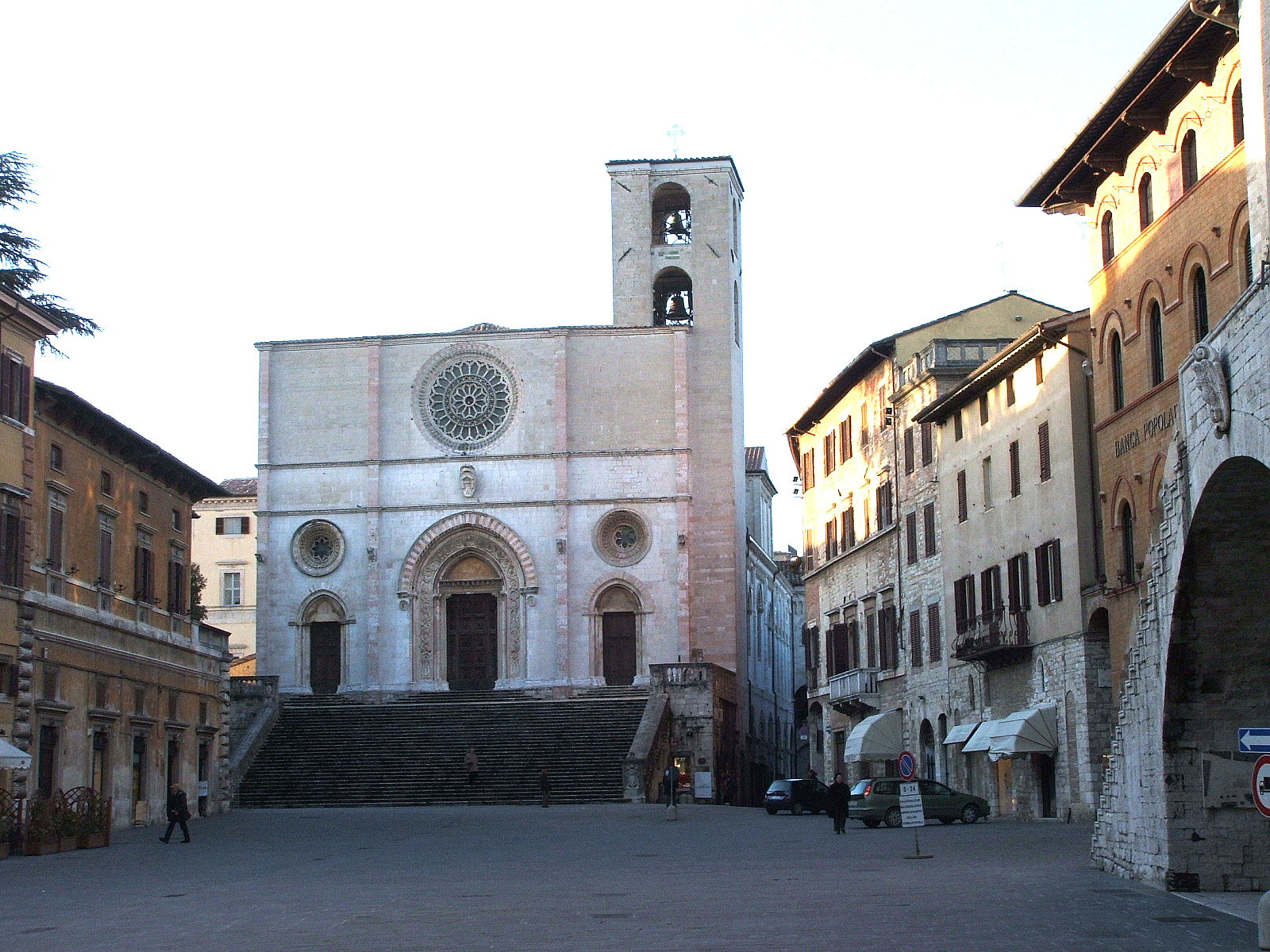
Todi Cathedral

The Italian Catholic diocese of Todi existed until 1986, when it was united into the diocese of Orvieto-Todi. Up until that point, the diocese had always been directly dependent on the Holy See.

== History ==
During the Gothic War the city of Todi withstood Totila during a long and severe siege. The Lombard failed to capture it, and Todi and Perugia remained the two chief fortresses defending the passage through the duchy from Rome to the Exarchate. It was included in Pepin's donation to the Holy See.

Other bishops are:

- Guglielmo Dallavigna (1405), who tried to induce the antipope Benedict XIII to renounce his claim;
- the brothers Cardinal Filippo Antonio Gualterio (1709) and Ludovico Anselmo Gualterio (1719), who erected a new seminary;
- Francesco M. Pasini (1760), under whom the restoration of the cathedral was completed.

=== Chapter and cathedral ===
The cathedral was also a parish church.

The Chapter of the cathedral of the Annunciation in Todi consisted of two dignities (the Provost and the Archdeacon) and twelve Canons, each with a prebend (assigned income). In addition there were eight mansionarii and other clergy. In 1673 and in 1746 there were two dignities and twelve Canons.

=== Synods ===
Bishop Angelo Cesi (1566–1606) presided over a diocesan synod in 1576, and published its constitutions, as well as those of earlier synods, including one of Bishop Andreas de Aptis (1356–1373).

A diocesan synod was held by Bishop Pietro Maria Bichi (1658–1673) on 22–24 May 1662, and another on 16 April 1668. Bishop Giuseppe Pianetti (1673–1709) held a diocesan synod in Todi on 27—29 April 1678.

Bishop Francesco Maria Gazzoli (1805–1848) held a diocesan synod on 1–2 May 1818.

=== Reorganization of dioceses ===
In a decree of the Second Vatican Council, it was recommended that dioceses be reorganized to take into account modern developments. Initiated under Pope John XXIII and continued by his successors, a project aimed to reduce the number of dioceses in Italy and adjust their boundaries in response to modern population shifts and a shortage of clergy. The need for reorganization became more pressing following modifications to the Concordat between the Italian State and the Holy See on 18 February 1984, which were formalized in a law enacted on 3 June 1985.

On 27 September 1986, Pope John Paul II approved the changes, which were subsequently enacted by a decree of the Sacred Congregation of Bishops on 30 September 1986. As a result, the Diocese of Todi was merged with the Diocese of Orvieto to form the Diocese of Orvieto-Todi (Dioecesis Urbevetana-Tudertina), with Orvieto designated as the diocesan seat. The former cathedral in Todi was granted the honorary title of co-cathedral, and its chapter was renamed the Capitulum Concathedralis. The reorganization established a single episcopal curia, seminary, and ecclesiastical tribunal, with all clergy becoming part of the newly formed diocese. The territorial jurisdiction of the diocese encompassed the combined areas of the former dioceses.

== Bishops of Todi ==
=== to 1200 ===
...

- Terentianus (4th century)

...

- Cresconius (attested 487–502)

[Candidus]
[Fortunatus]
[Callistus]

- Fortunatus (mid-6th cent.)

[Floridus]
[Sabinianus (Sabinius)]

- Laurentius (attested 649)

...

- Bonifatius (attested 680)

...

- Anonymous (743)

...

- Theophylactus of Todi (attested 787, 794)

...

- Joannes (attested 1015)

...

- Gregorius (attested 1037)

...

- Arduinus (attested 1050–1059)
- Rodulfus (attested 1068–1074)

...

- Guinardus (attested 1093)
- Oddo (attested 1109–1115)

Laurentius (attested 1117)

- Otto (1118–1144)
- Gratianus (1144–1179)
- Rusticus (1179–1218)

=== from 1200 to 1500 ===
- Bonifatius Colmezzo (1218–1238)
- Jacobus Ghezzi (attested 1238, 1249)
- Jacobus Azzi (c. 1250–1252)
- Petrus Gaetanus (1252–1276)
- Bentivenga de Bentivengis, O.Min. (1276–1278)
- Angelario de Bentivenghi, O.Min. (1278–1285)
- Nicolaus (1282–1296 ?)
- Nicolaus Armati (1296–1326)
- Rainuccio de Aptis (1326–1356)
- Andreas de Aptis (1356–1373)
- Stephanus Palosii (1373–1382) (Avignon Obedience)

Andreas de Aptis (1382–1384) (Avignon Obedience) Administrator

- Stephanus Palosii (1384–1395) Administrator
- Antonius de Calvis (1395–1405) (Roman Obedience)
- Guilelmus Dallavigna O.S.B. (1405–1407) (Roman Obedience)
- Franciscus de Agello (1407–1424)
- Angelus Scardoni, O.E.S.A. (1425–1428)
- Antonius of Anagni (1429–1434)
- Bartolomeo Aglioni (1435–1472)
- Constantin Eruli (1472–1474)
- Francesco Mascardi (1474–1499)
- Basilio Mascardi (1499–1517)

=== from 1500 to 1800 ===
- Aldericus Billioti (1517–1523)

Cardinal Paolo Emilio Cesi (1523) Administrator

- Federico Cesi (1523–1545)
- Giovanni Andrea Cesi (1545–1566)
- Angelo Cesi (1566–1606)
- Marcello Lante della Rovere (18 Dec 1606 – 6 Oct 1625 Resigned)
- Lodovico Cinci (6 Oct 1625 – 19 Sep 1638 Died)
- Ulderico Carpegna (11 Oct 1638 – 31 Aug 1643 Resigned)
- Giovanni Battista Altieri (seniore) (31 Aug 1643 – 26 Nov 1654 Died)
- Gerolamo Lomellini ( 1654 – 1656 Died)
- Pier Maria Bichi, O.S.B. (18 Mar 1658 –1673)
- Giuseppe Pianetti (17 Jul 1673 – Feb 1709 Died)
- Filippo Antonio Gualtieri (14 Oct 1709 – 5 Dec 1714 Resigned)
- Ludovico Anselmo Gualtieri (21 Jan 1715 – 15 Jul 1746 Died)
- Gerolamo Formagliari (28 Nov 1746 – 6 Jun 1760 Resigned)
- Francesco Maria Pasini (21 Jul 1760 – 24 Dec 1773 Died
- Tommaso Struzzieri, C.P. (18 Dec 1775 – 21 Jan 1780 Died)
- Giovanni Lotrecchi (20 Mar 1780 – 10 Sep 1800 Died)

=== since 1800 ===
- Francesco Maria Cioja (1800–1805)
- Francesco Maria Gazzoli (1805–1848)
- Nicola Rossi (1848–1854)
- Giovanni Rosati (23 Mar 1855 – 9 Mar 1882 Resigned)
- Eugenio Luzzi (27 Mar 1882 – 19 Feb 1888 Died)
- Giulio Boschi (1 Jun 1888 –1895)
- Giuseppe Ridolfi (29 Nov 1895 –1906)
- Giovanni Graziani (16 Oct 1906 – 7 Nov 1915 Died)
- Luigi Zaffarami (6 Dec 1915 – 10 Feb 1933 Resigned)
- Alfonso Maria de Sanctis (10 Aug 1933 – 8 Nov 1959 Died)
- Antonio Fustella (15 May 1960 –1967)
- Virginio Dondeo (12 Jul 1972 – 6 Aug 1974 Died)
- Decio Lucio Grandoni (12 Dec 1974 –1986)

30 September 1986: the diocese of Todi was united with the Diocese of Orvieto to form the Diocese of Orvieto-Todi. It ceased to exist as an independent bishopric.

== Bibliography ==
=== Reference works ===
- Gams, Pius Bonifatius (1873). Series episcoporum Ecclesiae catholicae: quotquot innotuerunt a beato Petro apostolo. Ratisbon: Typis et Sumptibus Georgii Josephi Manz. pp. 734–735. (Use with caution; obsolete)
- Eubel, Conradus, ed. (1913). Hierarchia catholica. Vol. Tomus 1 (second ed.). Münster: Libreria Regensbergiana. p. . (in Latin)
- Eubel, Conradus, ed. (1914). Hierarchia catholica. Vol. Tomus 2 (second ed.). Münster: Libreria Regensbergiana. p. 152.
- Gulik, Guilelmus (1923). Eubel, Conradus (ed.). Hierarchia catholica, Tomus 3 (second ed.). Münster: Libreria Regensbergiana. pp. .
- Gauchat, Patritius (Patrice) (1935). Hierarchia catholica. Vol. IV (1592-1667). Münster: Libraria Regensbergiana. p. .
- Ritzler, Remigius; Sefrin, Pirminus (1952). Hierarchia catholica medii et recentis aevi. Vol. V (1667-1730). Patavii: Messagero di S. Antonio. p. .
- Ritzler, Remigius; Sefrin, Pirminus (1958). Hierarchia catholica medii et recentis aevi. Vol. VI (1730-1799). Patavii: Messagero di S. Antonio. p. .

=== Studies ===
- Cappelletti, Giuseppe (1846). Le chiese d'Italia: dalla loro origine sino ai nostri giorni (in Italian). Vol. quinto (5). Venice: G. Antonelli. pp. 213–244.
- Ceci, Getulio (1897). Todi nel Medio Evo (in Italian). Todi: A. Trombetti.
- D'Ettorre, Francesca (1993). La diocesi di Todi (in Italian). Spoleto: Fondazione CISAM. ISBN 9788879882279.
- Lanzoni, Francesco (1927). Le diocesi d'Italia dalle origini al principio del secolo VII (an. 604). Faenza: F. Lega, pp. 419–427. (in Italian)
- Leonii, Lorenzo (1856). Memorie storiche di Todi (in Italian). Vol. Dispensa I. Todi: A. Natali. Leonii, Lorenzo (1856). Dispensa II. Leonii, Lorenzo (1857). Dispensa III. Leonii, Lorenzo (1857). Dispensa IV.
- Leonii, Lorenzo (1889). Cronica dei vescovi di Todi (in Italian). Todi: F. Franchi.
- Schwartz, Gerhard (1907). Die Besetzung der Bistümer Reichsitaliens unter den sächsischen und salischen Kaisern: mit den Listen der Bischöfe, 951-1122. Leipzig: B.G. Teubner. pp. 294–295. (in German)
- Ughelli, Ferdinando; Coleti, Nicolò (1717). Italia sacra: sive De episcopis Italiae et insularum adjacentium (in Latin). Vol. Tomus primus. Venice: apud Sebastianum Coleti. pp. 1463–1480.
