= Motta Montecorvino =

- Comune
- Comune di Motta Montecorvino
- Location within Italy Location within Apulia
- Coordinates: 41°30′N 15°7′E
- Country: Italy
- Region: Apulia
- Province: Foggia (FG)

Government
  - Mayor: Domenico Iavagnilio

Area
  - Total: 19.94 km^{2} (7.70 sq mi)
- Elevation: 662 m (2,172 ft)

Population (28 February 2017)
  - Total: 716
  - Density: 35.9/km^{2} (93.0/sq mi)
- Demonym: Mottesi
- Time zone: UTC+1 (CET)
  - Summer (DST): UTC+2 (CEST)
- Postal code: 71030
- Dialing code: 0881
- Patron saint: St. John the Baptist
- Saint day: 6 May
- Website: Official website

Motta Montecorvino (Pugliese: A Mottè) is a town, comune (municipality), former bishopric and present Latin Catholic titular see in the province of Foggia, Apulia, southeast Italy.

The city was losing its population in the early 15th century, and then an earthquake on 5 December 1456 reduced it to rubble and ruins, apart from a guard tower. Even its cathedral was destroyed.
