= Cape Planka =

Cape on Croatian coast of the Adriatic Sea

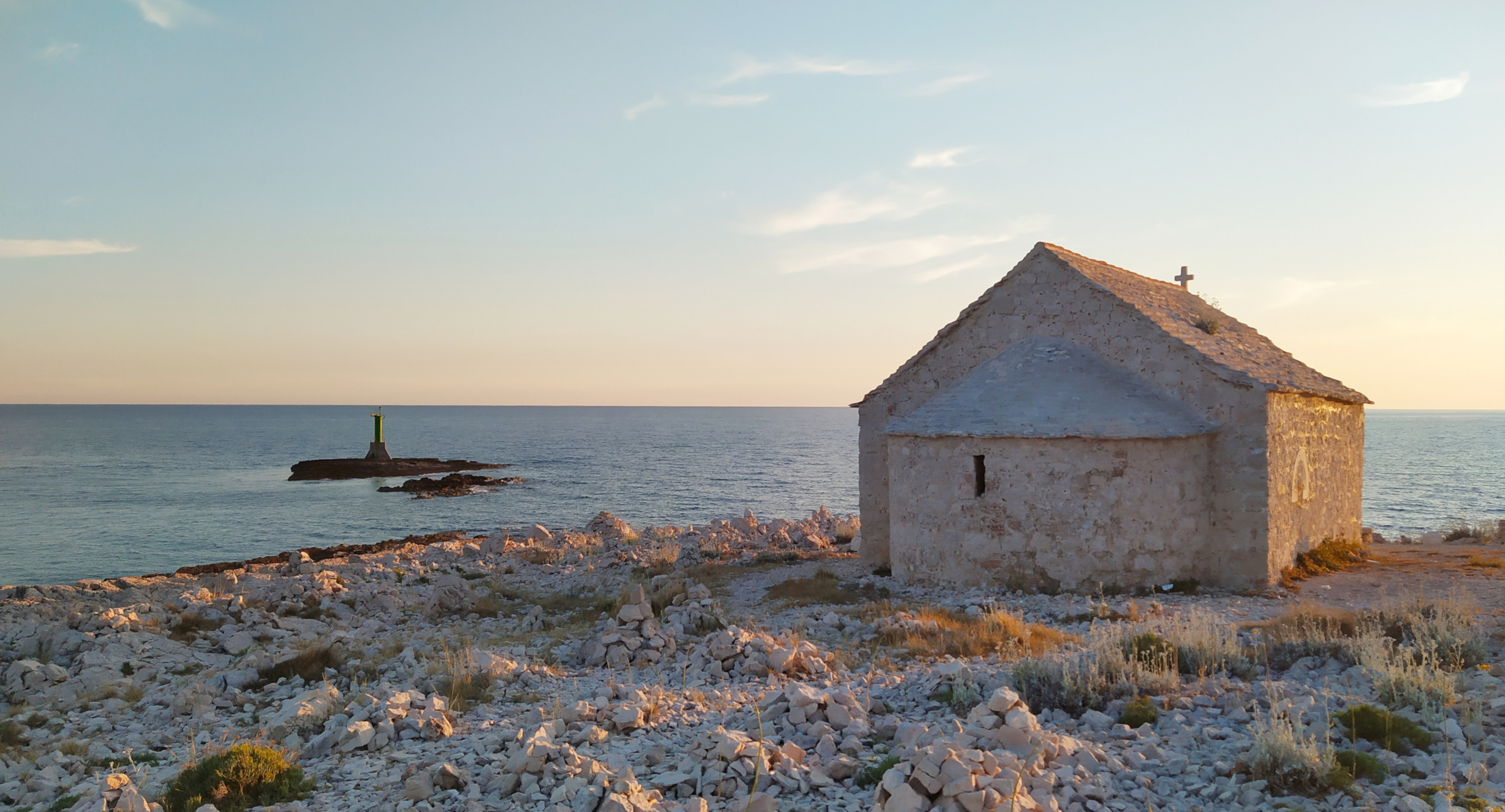
- Church dedicated to Saint John of Trogir at Cape Planka
- Interactive map of Cape Planka
- Coordinates: 43°29′39.19″N 15°58′12.04″E

Cape Planka (Croatian: Rt Ploča, Punta Planka) is a cape of the Croatian shore of the Adriatic Sea, located 2 kilometres (1.2 mi) southeast of the village of Rogoznica in Šibenik-Knin County. The cape is the most prominent point of land along the Dalmatian shore. It represents a geographic and climatological boundary of the northern and the southern Adriatic, often characterised by strong sea currents and swells as weather systems from the north and the south come in contact. There is a navigational beacon at the cape.

In classical antiquity, the cape was named after Diomedes, who was said to have sailed to that point of the coast. The cape is known as a hazardous point in navigation and there are several shipwrecks in the vicinity. There is a legend of a miracle attributed to John of Trogir, the bishop of the Roman Catholic Diocese of Tragurium and later a Christian saint. He is said to have saved Coloman, King of Hungary from death in a shipwreck off Cape Planka by walking on the surface of the sea. A votive church has been completed to commemorate the miracle on the cape in 1324.

Cape Planka was the southernmost point of the eastern Adriatic coast promised to the Kingdom of Italy by the Triple Entente during the World War I through the 1915 Treaty of London, in return for Italian entry into the war.
