= Lodovico Morosini =

Roman Catholic prelate

Most Reverend Lodovico Morosini
- Bishop of Modon
- Church: Catholic Church
- Diocese: Diocese of Modon
- In office: 1390–1407
- Predecessor: Leonardo Patrasso
- Successor: Antonio Correr
- Previous post: Bishop of Capodistria (1364–1390)

Orders
- Consecration: 27 July 1365 by Domenico Gaffaro

Personal details
- Died: 1407 Modon, Greece

Lodovico Morosini (died 1407) was a Roman Catholic prelate who served as Bishop of Modon (1390–1407) and Bishop of Capodistria (1364–1390).

== Biography ==
On 16 October 1364, Lodovico Morosini was appointed during the papacy of Urban V as Bishop of Capodistria. On 27 July 1365, he was consecrated bishop by Domenico Gaffaro, Bishop of Asolo, with Luca, Bishop of Cardica, and Giovanni Grandis, Bishop of Novigrad, serving as co-consecrators. On 21 November 1390, he was appointed during the papacy of Pope Boniface IX as Bishop of Modon. He served as Bishop of Modon until his death in 1407.

Catholic Church titles
Preceded by	Bishop of Capodistria; 1364–1390	Succeeded by Giacomo Loredan
Preceded by Leonardo Patrasso	Bishop of Modon; 1390–1407	Succeeded by Antonio Correr
