= Antonio Correr =

Antonio Correr may refer to:

- Antonio Correr (bishop) (1378–1445), Italian Roman Catholic bishop
- Antonio Correr (cardinal) (1359–1445), Italian Roman Catholic cardinal
