= Giuseppe Bologna =

Italian Roman Catholic prelate

Most Reverend Giuseppe Bologna
- Archbishop of Capua
- Church: Catholic Church
- Archdiocese: Archdiocese of Capua
- In office: 1691–1697
- Predecessor: Giacomo Cantelmo
- Successor: Carlo Loffredo
- Previous post: Archbishop of Benevento (1674–1680)

Personal details
- Born: 1634 Naples, Italy
- Died: 2 August 1697 (aged 62–63) Capua, Italy

Giuseppe Bologna (1634 – 2 August 1697) was a Roman Catholic prelate who served as Archbishop of Capua (1691–1697) and Archbishop of Benevento (1674–1680).

== Biography ==
Giuseppe Bologna was born in Naples, Italy in 1634. On 12 March 1674, he was appointed during the papacy of Pope Clement X as Archbishop of Benevento. He resigned in 1680. On 26 November 1691, he was appointed during the papacy of Pope Innocent XII as Archbishop of Capua. He served as Archbishop of Capua until his death on 2 August 1697.

== Episcopal succession ==
While bishop, he was the principal co-consecrator of:
- Paolo Filocamo (bishop), Bishop of Squillace (1676);
- Carlo Filippo Sfondrati, Bishop of Volterra (1677);
- Lelio Ardizzone, Bishop of Casale Monferrato (1680);
- Giuseppe Consoli, Bishop of Bisignano (1680);
- Alberto Mugiasca, Bishop of Alessandria della Paglia (1680);
- Benedetto Giacinto Sangermano, Bishop of Nusco (1680);
- Francesco Pignatelli, Archbishop of Taranto (1683);
- Giacomo Cantelmo, Titular Archbishop of Caesarea in Cappadocia (1683);
- Francesco Maria Moles, Bishop of Nola (1684);
- Annibale de Pietropaulo, Bishop of Castellammare di Stabia (1684);
- Nicolaus Gabrieli, Bishop of Novigrad (1684);
- Joannes Cuppari, Bishop of Trogir (1684);
- Stefano David, Bishop of Krk (1684);
- Pietro Vecchia (bishop), Bishop of Andria (1690);
- Domenico de Zaoli, Bishop of Veroli (1690);
- Michele de Bologna, Bishop of Isernia (1690);
- Charles Montecatini, Titular Archbishop of Chalcedon (1690);
- Marcello d'Aste, Titular Archbishop of Athenae (1692);
- Giovanni Battista Carrone, Bishop of Strongoli (1692); and
- Pietro Martire Giustiniani, Archbishop of Naxos (1692).

== See also ==
- Catholic Church in Italy

== External links and additional sources ==
- Cheney, David M. "Archdiocese of Benevento". Catholic-Hierarchy.org. (for Chronology of Bishops) ^{[self-published]}
- Chow, Gabriel. "Archdiocese of Benevento (Italy)". GCatholic.org. (for Chronology of Bishops) ^{[self-published]}
- Cheney, David M. "Archdiocese of Capua". Catholic-Hierarchy.org. (for Chronology of Bishops) ^{[self-published]}
- Chow, Gabriel. "Archdiocese of Capua (Italy)". GCatholic.org. (for Chronology of Bishops) ^{[self-published]}

Catholic Church titles
Preceded by Giovan Battista Foppa	Archbishop of Benevento; 1674–1680	Succeeded by Girolamo Gastaldi
Preceded by Giacomo Cantelmo	Archbishop of Capua; 1691–1697	Succeeded by Carlo Loffredo
