= Francesco Maria Giannotti =

Italian Roman Catholic prelate

Most Reverend Francesco Maria Giannotti
- Bishop of Segni
- Church: Catholic Church
- Diocese: Diocese of Segni
- In office: 1682–1699
- Predecessor: Guarnerio Guarnieri
- Successor: Orazio Minimi

Orders
- Ordination: 1 May 1682
- Consecration: 14 June 1682

Personal details
- Born: 1635 Rome, Italy
- Died: April 1699 (aged 63–64) Segni, Italy

Francesco Maria Giannotti (1635 – April, 1699) was a Roman Catholic prelate who served as Bishop of Segni (1682–1699).

== Biography ==
Francesco Maria Giannotti was born in Rome, Italy in 1635, He was ordained a deacon on 26 April 1682 and as a priest on 1 May 1682. On 4 May 1682, he was appointed during the papacy of Pope Innocent XI as Bishop of Segni. On 14 June 1682, he was consecrated bishop. He served as Bishop of Segni until his death in April 1699.

== Episcopal succession ==
While bishop, he was the principal co-consecrator of:

- Rainutius Baschi, Bishop of Senigallia (1682);
- Stefano Ghirardelli, Bishop of Alatri (1683);
- Agostino Fieschi, Bishop of Accia and Mariana (1683);
- Giambattista Quaranta, Bishop of Larino (1683);
- Giovanni Battista de Belli, Bishop of Telese o Cerreto Sannita (1684);
- Fulvio Crivelli, Bishop of Tricarico (1684);
- Antonio Polcenigo, Bishop of Feltre (1684);
- Domenico Minio, Bishop of Caorle (1684);
- Giambattista Rubini, Bishop of Vicenza (1684);
- Giovanni Battista De Pace, Bishop of Capaccio (1684);
- Nicolaus Gabrieli, Bishop of Novigrad (1684);
- Joannes Cuppari, Bishop of Trogir (1684); and
- Stefano David, Bishop of Krk (1684).

== External links and additional sources ==
- Cheney, David M. "Diocese of Segni". Catholic-Hierarchy.org. (for Chronology of Bishops) ^{[self-published]}
- Chow, Gabriel. "Diocese of Segni (Italy)". GCatholic.org. (for Chronology of Bishops) ^{[self-published]}

Catholic Church titles
| Preceded by Guarnerio Guarnieri | Bishop of Segni; 1682–1699 | Succeeded by Orazio Minimi |
