= Pace Giordano =

Most Reverend Pace Giordano
- Bishop of Trogir
- Church: Catholic Church
- Diocese: Diocese of Trogir
- In office: 1623–1649
- Predecessor: Martius Andreucci
- Successor: Franciscus Coccalini

Orders
- Consecration: 25 March 1623 by Marco Antonio Gozzadini

Personal details
- Born: 1586 Valle de Conty, Italy
- Died: 22 January 1649 (age 63) Trogir, Croatia

Pace Giordano or Pax Jordanus (1586–1649) was a Roman Catholic prelate who served as Bishop of Trogir (1623–1649).

== Biography ==
Pace Giordano was born in Valle de Conty, Italy in 1586. On 20 March 1623, he was appointed during the papacy of Pope Gregory XV as Bishop of Trogir. On 25 March 1623, he was consecrated bishop by Marco Antonio Gozzadini, Cardinal-Priest of Sant'Eusebio, with Joannes Mattaeus Caryophyllis, Titular Archbishop of Iconium, and Carlo Bovi, Bishop of Bagnoregio, serving as co-consecrators. He served as Bishop of Trogir until his death 22 January 1649.

== Episcopal succession ==
Episcopal succession of Pace Giordano

While bishop, he was the principal co-consecrator of:

- Ubertinus Papafava, Bishop of Adria (1623);
- Thomas Ivkovich, Bishop of Scardona (1626);
- Giulio Saraceni, Bishop of Pula (1627); and
- Thomas Marnavich, Bishop of Bosnia (1640).

== External links and additional sources ==
- Cheney, David M. "Diocese of Trogir (Traù)". Catholic-Hierarchy.org. (for Chronology of Bishops)^{self-published}
- Chow, Gabriel. "Titular Episcopal See of Trogir". GCatholic.org. (for Chronology of Bishops)^{self-published}

Catholic Church titles
| Preceded by Martius Andreucci | Bishop of Trogir; 1623–1649 | Succeeded by Franciscus Coccalini |
