= Paolo Naldini =

Paolo Naldini may refer to:

- Pietro Paolo Naldini (1619–1691), Italian sculptor
- Paolo Naldini (bishop) (1632–1713), bishop of Capodistria
