= Giulio Saraceni =

Roman Catholic prelate

Most Reverend Giulio Saraceni
- Bishop of Pula
- Church: Catholic Church
- Diocese: Diocese of Pula
- In office: 1627–1640
- Predecessor: Rodolfo Rodolfi-Sforza
- Successor: Marino Badoer

Orders
- Consecration: 19 March 1627 by Federico Baldissera Bartolomeo Cornaro

Personal details
- Died: August 1640 Pula, Italy

Giulio Saraceni (died August 1640) was a Roman Catholic prelate who served as Bishop of Pula (1627–1640).

== Biography ==
On 1 March 1627, Giulio Saraceni was appointed by Pope Urban VIII as Bishop of Pula. On 19 March 1627, he was consecrated bishop by Federico Baldissera Bartolomeo Cornaro, Bishop of Bergamo with Germanicus Mantica, Titular Bishop of Famagusta, and Pace Giordano, Bishop of Trogir, serving as co-consecrators. He served as Bishop of Pula until his death in August 1640.

While bishop, he was the principal co-consecrator of: Marc'Antonio Verità, Bishop of Ossero (1633).

== External links and additional sources ==
- Cheney, David M. "Diocese of Pula (Pola)". Catholic-Hierarchy.org. (for Chronology of Bishops) ^{[self-published]}
- Chow, Gabriel. "Diocese of Pula (Pola) (Croatia)". GCatholic.org. (for Chronology of Bishops) ^{[self-published]}

Catholic Church titles
Preceded by Rodolfo Rodolfi-Sforza	Bishop of Pula; 1627–1640	Succeeded by Marino Badoer
