= Antonio Elio =

Roman Catholic prelate

Most Reverend Antonio Elio
- Bishop of Capodistria
- Church: Catholic Church
- Diocese: Diocese of Capodistria
- In office: 1572–1576
- Predecessor: Adriano Beretti
- Successor: Giovanni Ingenerio
- Previous posts: Bishop of Pula (1548–1566); Titular Patriarch of Jerusalem (1558–1572)

Personal details
- Born: 1506 Capodistria
- Died: 1576 (aged 69–70) Capodistria

Antonio Elio or Antonio Helius (1506–1576) was a Roman Catholic prelate who served as Bishop of Capodistria (1572–1576), Titular Patriarch of Jerusalem (1558–1572), and Bishop of Pula (1548–1566).

== Biography ==
Antonio Elio was born in Capodistria in 1506. On 17 August 1548, he was appointed during the papacy of Pope Paul III as Bishop of Pula. On 20 July 1558, he was appointed during the papacy of Pope Paul IV as Titular Patriarch of Jerusalem. In 1566, he resigned as Bishop of Pula. On 30 July 1572, he was appointed during the papacy of Pope Gregory XIII as Bishop of Capodistria. He served as Bishop of Capodistria until his death in 1576.

== Episcopal succession ==
While bishop, he was the principal consecrator of:

- Giuseppe Pamphilj, Bishop of Segni (1570);

and the principal co-consecrator of:

- Giovanni D'Amato, Bishop of Minori (1565);
- Cristoforo Scotti, Bishop of Cavaillon (1569);
- Girolamo di Corregio, Archbishop of Taranto (1570);
- Claude de La Baume, Archbishop of Besançon (1570);
- Nicolò Ormanetto, Bishop of Padova (1570);
- Wolfgang Holl, Auxiliary Bishop of Eichstätt (1570);
- Alfonso Binarini, Bishop of Rieti (1572);
- Alessandro Riario, Titular Patriarch of Alexandria (1572);
- Leonardo Truchi, Bishop of Noli (1572); and
- Ferdinando Farnese, Bishop of Corneto e Montefiascone (1572).

== External links and additional sources ==
- Cheney, David M. "Diocese of Pula (Pola)". Catholic-Hierarchy.org. (for Chronology of Bishops) ^{[self-published]}
- Chow, Gabriel. "Diocese of Pula (Pola) (Croatia)". GCatholic.org. (for Chronology of Bishops) ^{[self-published]}
- Cheney, David M. "Patriarchate of Jerusalem {Gerusalemme}". Catholic-Hierarchy.org. (for Chronology of Bishops) ^{[self-published]}
- Chow, Gabriel. "Patriarchal See of Jerusalem (Israel)". GCatholic.org. (for Chronology of Bishops) ^{[self-published]}
- Cheney, David M. "Diocese of Capodistria (Capo d'Istria)(Koper)". Catholic-Hierarchy.org. (for Chronology of Bishops) ^{[self-published]}
- Chow, Gabriel. "Diocese of Koper (Croatia)". GCatholic.org. (for Chronology of Bishops) ^{[self-published]}

Catholic Church titles
Preceded by Giovanni Battista Vergerio	Bishop of Pula; 1548–1566	Succeeded by Matteo Barbabianca
Preceded by Cristoforo Spiriti	Titular Patriarch of Jerusalem; 1558–1572	Succeeded by Giovanni Antonio Facchinetti de Nuce
Preceded by Adriano Beretti	Bishop of Capodistria; 1572–1576	Succeeded by Giovanni Ingegneri
