= Tommaso Guzzoni =

Italian Roman Catholic prelate

Most Reverend Tommaso Guzzoni
- Bishop Emeritus of Sora
- Church: Catholic Church
- Diocese: Diocese of Sora
- In office: 1681–1702
- Predecessor: Marco Antonio Pisanelli
- Successor: Matteo Gagliani

Orders
- Ordination: 18 September 1655
- Consecration: 6 January 1681 by Alessandro Crescenzi (cardinal)

Personal details
- Born: Benevento, Italy 28 September 1632
- Died: 8 November 1704 Sora, Italy

Tommaso Guzzoni CO (28 September 1632 – 8 November 1704) was an Italian Catholic prelate who served as Bishop of Sora from 1681 until 1702.

== Biography ==
Tommaso Guzzoni was born in Benevento, Italy on 28 September 1632. On 13 May 1653, he professed as a member of the Congregation of the Oratory of Saint Philip Neri and was ordained a deacon on 19 December 1654 and ordained a priest on 18 September 1655. On 13 January 1681, he was appointed during the papacy of Pope Innocent XI as Bishop of Sora. On 26 January 1681, he was consecrated bishop by Alessandro Crescenzi (cardinal), Bishop of Recanati e Loreto, with Pier Antonio Capobianco, Bishop Emeritus of Lacedonia, and Antonio Savo de' Panicoli, Bishop of Termoli, serving as co-consecrators. He served as Bishop of Sora until his resignation on 5 December 1702. He died on 8 November 1704.

== Episcopal succession ==
While bishop, he was the principal co-consecrator of:

- Giovanni Vincenzo de Filippi, Bishop of Cefalonia e Zante (1698);
- Sebastiano Feoli, Bishop of Guardialfiera (1698);
- Francesco Morgioni, Bishop of Ruvo (1698);
- Fabrizio Maffei, Bishop of Penne e Atri (1698);
- Giovanni Cito, Bishop of Lettere-Gragnano (1698);
- Biagio Terzi, Bishop of Isernia (1698);
- Luca Trapani, Bishop of Ischia (1698);
- Filippo Anastasio, Archbishop of Sorrento (1699);
- Francesco Girgenti, Bishop of Patti (1699);
- Giuseppe Falces, Bishop of Pozzuoli (1699);
- Vincenzo Corcione, Bishop of Capaccio (1699);
- Stefano Cupilli, Bishop of Trogir (1699);
- Giuseppe de Carolis, Bishop of Aquino (1699);
- Orazio Minimi, Bishop of Segni (1699);
- Philippus Albini, Bishop of Sant'Agata de' Goti (1699);
- Antonio Rosignoli, Bishop of Arbe (1700);
- Emanuele Cicatelli, Bishop of Avellino e Frigento (1700); and
- Nicolò Cervini, Bishop of Lavello (1700).

== External links and additional sources ==
- Cheney, David M. "Diocese of Sora-Cassino-Aquino-Portecorvino". Catholic-Hierarchy.org. (for Chronology of Bishops) ^{[self-published]}
- Chow, Gabriel. "Diocese of Sora-Cassino-Aquino-Portecorvino (Italy)". GCatholic.org. (for Chronology of Bishops) ^{[self-published]}

Catholic Church titles
Preceded by Marco Antonio Pisanelli	Bishop of Sora; 1681–1702	Succeeded by Matteo Gagliani
