= Bottari =

Bottari is a surname. Notable people with the surname include:

- Angela Maria Bottari (1945–2023), Italian politician
- Franco Bottari (1925–1988), Italian set designer, screenwriter, and film director
- Giovanni Gaetano Bottari (1689–1775), Italian scholar and theologian
- Giuseppe Maria Bottari (1646–1729), Roman Catholic prelate
- Vic Bottari (1916–2003), American football player
