= Giovanni Ingegneri =

- Bishop of Capodistria
- Church: Catholic Church
- See: Diocese of Capodistria
- Appointed: 3 December 1576
- Term ended: 13 January 1600
- Predecessor: Antonio Elio
- Successor: Girolamo Contarini

Orders
- Consecration: 15 December 1577 (Bishop) by Giovanni Trevisan Patriarch of Venice

Personal details
- Born: 1522 or 1523 Venezia
- Died: 13 January 1600 (aged 77) Venezia

Giovanni Ingegneri (or Ingenerio, Latin: Johannes Ingegnierius, Venetian: Zuane Inzegneri; c.1522 – 1600) was bishop of Capodistria from 1576 to his death. A Jurist, he is mainly known for his treatise on physiognomy.

== Life ==
Giovanni Ingegneri was born in Venice to a Venetian family in 1522 or 1523. He studied at the University of Padua. From 1570 he became vicar and auditor (lawyer) of the bishop of Padua Nicolò Ormanetto, and because of this position he actively participated to the life of the university.

Cardinal Giovanni Francesco Commendone proposed Giovanni Ingegneri as new bishop of Capodistria after the resignation of Patriarch Antonio Elio. His appointed was debated because he had killed a men during an assault in which he was victim. However it was judged being a self-defense and he was appointed bishop on 3 December 1576. At the moment of his appointment he had not yet received the holy orders. He received the episcopal consecration in the chapel of Saint Justus of the Patriarcal Palace of Castello on 15 December 1577 by the hands of the Patriarch of Venice Giovanni Trevisan. He entered in the town of Capodistria not before March 1568.

Giovanni Ingegneri was particularly active in implementing the measures of the Council of Trent, in reforming the clergy and in defending the public morality. In 1574 he gathered a diocesan synod and personally visited the parishes of the diocese. His diocese was visited from 4 to 22 February 1580 by Cardinal Agostino Valier sent by the Republic of Venice to check the status of this strategic area at the borders of the Republic: Giovanni Ingegneri passed very successfully this deep investigation. He always remained a loyal citizen of Venice. In May 1596 he visited Rome.

He died in Venice on 13 January 1600 at the age of 77.

== Works ==
His main work appeared posthumous in 1606 in Napoli published by his nephew, the scholar Angelo Ingegneri, with the title Fisionomia naturale di monsignor Giovanni Ingegneri vescovo di Capod'Istria. Nella quale con ragioni tolte dalla filosofia, dalla medicina, dall'anatomia, si dimostra, come dalle parti del corpo humano, per la sua naturale complessione, si possa agevolmente conietturare quali siano le inclinazioni degl'huomini. The edition of 1606 in Napoli was anonymous, the following editions in the 17 century had his name. This book was near to be considered dubious by the Church. It is a treatise of physiognomy, a discipline in use at that time. It merged knowledges of philosophy, medicine and law in order to read the motions, gestures and signs of the body, and the emotions on face, as clues of guilty of a defendant.

He is remembered also for the treatise of Law in three books, never published, Contro la sofistica disciplina de' giureconsulti, in which he showed that the tradition of the Venetian Law System was superior to the old jurisprudence based on the Roman Law.
