= Agostino da Lanzano =

Italian Roman Catholic prelate

Most Reverend Agostino da Lanzano
- Bishop of Spoleto
- Church: Catholic Church
- In office: 1404–1410
- Successor: Niccolò Vivari
- Previous posts: Bishop of Penne e Atri (1380–1390); Bishop of Perugia (1390–1404)

Personal details
- Died: 1410 Spoleto, Italy

Agostino da Lanzano (died 1410) was a Roman Catholic prelate who served as Bishop of Spoleto (1404–1410), Bishop of Perugia (1390–1404), and Bishop of Penne e Atri (1380–1390).

== Biography ==
On 14 February 1380, Agostino da Lanzano was appointed by Pope Urban VI as Bishop of Penne e Atri. On 29 October 1390, he was appointed by Pope Boniface IX as Bishop of Perugia. On 27 February 1404, he was appointed during the papacy of Pope Boniface IX as Bishop of Spoleto. He served as Bishop of Spoleto until his death in 1410.

While bishop, he was the principal co-consecrator of Antonio Correr, Bishop of Modon (1407).

== External links and additional sources ==
- Cheney, David M. "Archdiocese of Pescara-Penne". Catholic-Hierarchy.org. (Chronology of Bishops) ^{[self-published]}
- Chow, Gabriel. "Metropolitan Archdiocese of Pescara-Penne". GCatholic.org. (Chronology of Bishops) ^{[self-published]}
- Cheney, David M. "Archdiocese of Perugia-Città della Pieve". Catholic-Hierarchy.org. (for Chronology of Bishops) ^{[self-published]}
- Chow, Gabriel. "Metropolitan Archdiocese of Perugia-Città della Pieve (Italy)". GCatholic.org. (for Chronology of Bishops) ^{[self-published]}
- Cheney, David M. "Archdiocese of Spoleto-Norcia". Catholic-Hierarchy.org. (for Chronology of Bishops) ^{[self-published]}
- Chow, Gabriel. "Archdiocese of Spoleto-Norcia". GCatholic.org. (Chronology of Bishops) ^{[self-published]}

Catholic Church titles
Preceded by	Bishop of Penne e Atri; 1380-1390	Succeeded by
Preceded by	Bishop of Perugia; 1390–1404	Succeeded by
Preceded by	Bishop of Spoleto; 1404–1410	Succeeded by Niccolò Vivari
