= Pier Matteo Petrucci =

18th-century Catholic cardinal

His Eminence Pier Matteo Petrucci
- Cardinal-Priest of San Marcello
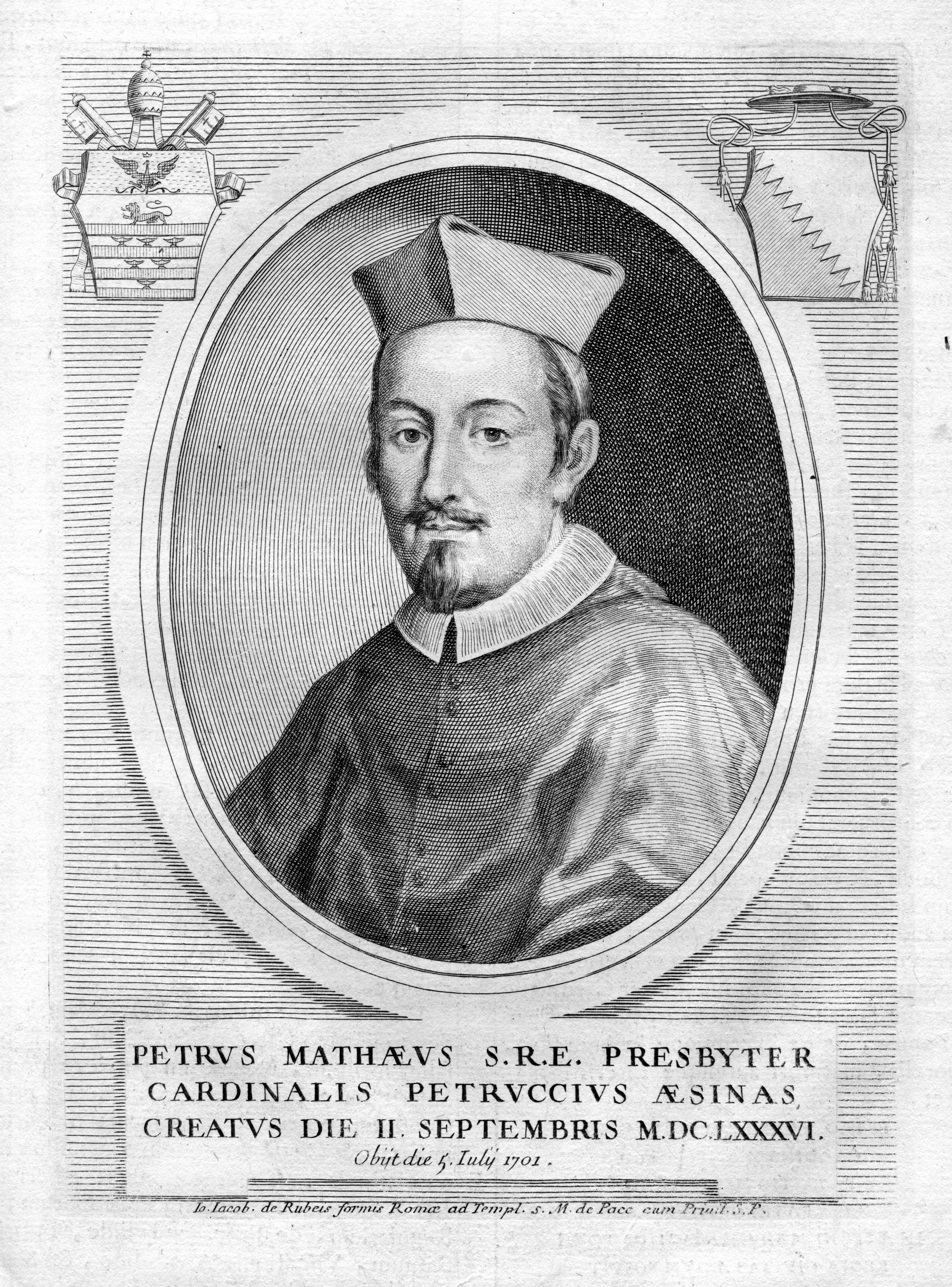
- Church: Catholic Church
- In office: 1687–1701
- Predecessor: Federico Baldeschi Colonna
- Successor: Gianalberto Badoer

Orders
- Consecration: 20 April 1681 by Alderano Cibo
- Rank: Cardinal-Priest

Personal details
- Born: 20 May 1636 Jesi, Italy
- Died: 5 July 1701 (aged 65)

Pier Matteo Petrucci, C.O. (1636–1701) was a Roman Catholic cardinal.

== Biography ==
Pier Matteo Petrucci was a priest and a philosophy professor. Together with Cardinal Alderano Cibo, he founded an institute for runaway children. In 1678, he became a superior of his Order. On 20 April 1681 he was consecrated bishop by Alderano Cibo, Cardinal-Bishop of Frascati in Jesi. Giacomo Altoviti, Titular Patriarch of Antiochia, and Odoardo Cibo, Titular Archbishop of Seleucia in Isauria were serving as co-consecrators. Pope Innocent XI made him a cardinal on 2 September 1686.

His works on mysticism and spirituality were criticized by the Jesuit Paolo Segneri. In 1688, the Inquisition banned his Quietistic writings about the passive resignation of the soul to God for being heretically mystical. Oddly enough, a treatise for women authored by the cardinal was still translated for English Protestants.

Petrucci participated at the conclaves of 1689 (election of Alexander VIII), 1691 (election of Innocent XII), and 1700 (election of Clement XI). He was Camerlengo of the Holy Roman Church in 1694–95.

== Episcopal succession ==
While bishop, he was the principal consecrator of:

- Giaconto Tuartkovich, Bishop of Stagno (1693);
- Placido Scoppa, Archbishop of Dubrovnik (1693);
- Bernardino Plastina, Bishop of Oppido Mamertina (1694);
- Francesco Maria Federico Carafa, Bishop of San Marco (1694);
- Giovanni Andrea Monreale, Archbishop of Lanciano (1695);
- Giuseppe Maria Bottari, Bishop of Pula (1695);
- Epifanio Fanelli, Bishop of Cefalonia e Zante (1695);
- François Marie Sacco, Bishop of Ajaccio (1695);
- Octavius Spader, Bishop of Arbe (1695);
- Bartolomeo Castelli, Bishop of Mazara del Vallo (1695);
- Gregorio Compagni, Bishop of Sansepolcro (1696);
- Maioranus Figlioli, Bishop of Caiazzo (1696);
- Giuseppe Schinosi, Bishop of Caserta (1696);
- Bernabé de Castro, Archbishop of Lanciano (1697);
- Lorenzo Kreutter de Corvinis, Bishop of Vieste (1697);
- Fortunato Durante, Bishop of Squillace (1697);
- Ambrosio Angelini, Bishop of Acquapendente (1697);
- Agustín Antonio de Arellano, Archbishop of Brindisi (1698);
- Ambrogio Croce, Bishop of Bobbio (1698);
- Gaetano De Andrea, Bishop of Monopoli (1698);
- Michele Gallo Vandeinde, Bishop of Capri (1698);
- Antonio Forteguerra, Bishop of Pienza (1698);
- Giulio Troili, Bishop of Foligno (1698);
- Fabrizio Maffei, Bishop of Penne e Atri (1698);
- Giovanni Cito, Bishop of Lettere-Gragnano (1698);
- Biagio Terzi, Bishop of Isernia (1698);
- Luca Trapani, Bishop of Ischia (1698);
- François Amédée Milliet d'Arvillars, Bishop of Aosta (1699);
- Giovanni Battista Braschi, Bishop of Sarsina (1699);
- Giuseppe de Carolis, Bishop of Aquino (1699);
- Orazio Minimi, Bishop of Segni (1699);
- Tommaso d'Aquino, Bishop of Vico Equense (1700); and
- Giovanni Battista Capano, Bishop of Bitonto (1700).

Catholic Church titles
Preceded by Lorenzo Cibo	Bishop of Jesi; 1681–1691	Succeeded by Alessandro Fedele
Preceded by Federico Baldeschi Colonna	Cardinal-Priest of San Marcello; 1687–1701	Succeeded by Gianalberto Badoer
