= Domenico Gaffaro =

Roman Catholic Bishop

Most Reverend Domenico Gaffaro
- Bishop of Asolo
- Church: Catholic Church
- See: Diocese of Asolo
- In office: 1348–1371

Personal details
- Died: 1371 Asolo, Italy

Domenico Gaffaro (died 1371) was a Roman Catholic prelate who served as Bishop of Asolo (1348–1371).

== Biography ==
On 5 November 1348, he was appointed during the papacy of Pope Gregory XIII as Bishop of Asolo. He served as Bishop of Asolo until his death in 1371. While bishop, he was the principal consecrator of Lodovico Morosini, Bishop of Capodistria (1365).

Catholic Church titles
| Preceded by | Bishop of Asolo; 1348–1371 | Succeeded by |
