= Michele Orsini =

Catholic Bishop of Pula from 1475 to 1493

Most Reverend Michele Orsini
- Bishop of Pula
- Church: Catholic Church
- Diocese: Diocese of Pula
- In office: 1475–1493
- Predecessor: Biaggio Molino
- Successor: Altobello de Averoldi

Orders
- Consecration: 2 April 1475 by Marco Barbo

Personal details
- Died: 1493 Pula, Italy

Michele Orsini (died 1493) was a Roman Catholic prelate who served as Bishop of Pula (1475–1493).

== Biography ==
On 8 March 1475, Michele Orsini was appointed by Pope Sixtus IV as Bishop of Pula. On 2 April 1475, he was consecrated bishop by Marco Barbo, Patriarch of Aquileia with Leonello Chiericato, Bishop of Arbe, serving as co-consecrator. He served as Bishop of Pula until his death in 1493.

== External links and additional sources ==
- Cheney, David M. "Diocese of Pula (Pola)". Catholic-Hierarchy.org. (for Chronology of Bishops) ^{[self-published]}
- Chow, Gabriel. "Diocese of Pula (Pola) (Croatia)". GCatholic.org. (for Chronology of Bishops) ^{[self-published]}

Catholic Church titles
| Preceded by Biaggio Molino | Bishop of Pula; 1475–1493 | Succeeded by Altobello de Averoldi |
