= Giacomo Ciera =

Roman Catholic bishop

Most Reverend Giacomo Ciera
- Bishop of Chiron
- Church: Catholic Church
- Diocese: Diocese of Chiron
- In office: 1406–?

Giacomo Ciera was a Roman Catholic prelate who served as Bishop of Chiron (1406–?).

== Biography ==
On 1 Mar 1406, Giacomo Ciera was appointed during the papacy of Pope Innocent VII as Bishop of Chiron. It is uncertain how long he served. While bishop, he was the principal co-consecrator of Antonio Correr, Bishop of Modon (1407).

== See also ==
- Catholic Church in Greece

Catholic Church titles
Preceded by	Bishop of Chiron; 1406–?	Succeeded by
