= Nicolaus Gabrieli =

Italian Roman Catholic prelate

Most Reverend Nicolaus Gabrieli
- Bishop of Novigrad
- Church: Catholic Church
- Diocese: Diocese of Novigrad
- In office: 1684–1717
- Predecessor: Giacomo Bruti
- Successor: Daniele Sansoni

Orders
- Ordination: 21 September 1670
- Consecration: 25 June 1684 by Alessandro Crescenzi (cardinal)

Personal details
- Born: 31 January 1645 Villa Rivolti, Codroipo, Italy
- Died: 12 April 1717 (aged 72)

Nicolaus Gabrieli (born 31 January 1645 – 12 April 1717) was a Roman Catholic prelate who served as Bishop of Novigrad (1684–1717).

== Biography ==
Nicolaus Gabrieli was born in Villa Rivolti, Codroipo, Italy on 31 January 1645 and ordained a priest on 21 September 1670. On 19 June 1684, he was appointed during the papacy of Pope Innocent XI as Bishop of Novigrad. On 25 June 1684, he was consecrated bishop by Alessandro Crescenzi (cardinal), Cardinal-Priest of Santa Prisca, with Giuseppe Bologna, Archbishop Emeritus of Benevento, and Francesco Maria Giannotti, Bishop of Segni, serving as co-consecrators. He served as Bishop of Novigrad until his death on 12 April 1717.

== External links and additional sources ==
- Cheney, David M. "Diocese of Novigrad (Cittanova)". Catholic-Hierarchy.org. (for Chronology of Bishops) ^{[self-published]}
- Chow, Gabriel. "Titular Episcopal See of Novigrad (Croatia)". GCatholic.org. (for Chronology of Bishops) ^{[self-published]}

Catholic Church titles
Preceded by Giacomo Bruti	Bishop of Novigrad; 1684–1717	Succeeded by Daniele Sansoni
