= Manuel de la Torre Gutiérrez =

Most Reverend Manuel de la Torre Gutiérrez
- Archbishop of Lanciano
- Church: Catholic Church
- Archdiocese: Archdiocese of Lanciano
- In office: 1688–1694
- Predecessor: Francesco Antonio Carafa
- Successor: Giovanni Andrea Monreale

Orders
- Consecration: 24 August 1688 by Carlo Pio di Savoia

Personal details
- Born: 18 June 1635 Alcalá de Henares, Spain
- Died: 21 July 1694 (age 59) Lanciano, Italy

Manuel de la Torre Gutiérrez, O. de M. (1635–1694) was a Roman Catholic prelate who served as Archbishop of Lanciano (1688–1694).

== Biography ==
Manuel de la Torre Gutiérrez was born in Alcalá de Henares, Spain on 18 June 1635 and ordained a priest in the Order of the Blessed Virgin Mary of Mercy. On 9 August 1688, he was appointed Archbishop of Lanciano by Pope Innocent XI.

On 24 August 1688, he was consecrated bishop by Carlo Pio di Savoia, Cardinal-Bishop of Sabina, with Pietro de Torres, Archbishop of Dubrovnik, and Pier Antonio Capobianco, Bishop Emeritus of Lacedonia, serving as co-consecrators.

He served as Archbishop of Lanciano until his death on 21 July 1694.

== External links and additional sources ==
- Cheney, David M. "Archdiocese of Lanciano-Ortona". Catholic-Hierarchy.org. (for Chronology of Bishops) ^{[self-published]}
- Chow, Gabriel. "Archdiocese of Lanciano-Ortona (Italy)". GCatholic.org. (for Chronology of Bishops) ^{[self-published]}

Catholic Church titles
Preceded by Francesco Antonio Carafa	Archbishop of Lanciano; 1688–1694	Succeeded by Giovanni Andrea Monreale
