= Pier Giulio Delfino =

Italian Roman Catholic prelate

Most Reverend Pier Giulio Delfino
- Church: Catholic Church
- Diocese: Diocese of Capodistria
- In office: 1684–1685
- Predecessor: Francesco Zeno
- Successor: Paolo Naldini (bishop)

Orders
- Ordination: 28 October 1671
- Consecration: 24 June 1684 by Alessandro Crescenzi (cardinal)

Personal details
- Born: 3 April 1634 Rovigo, Italy
- Died: 24 April 1685 (age 51) Capodistria, Slovenia

Pier Giulio Delfino (3 April, 1634 – 24 April, 1685) was a Roman Catholic prelate who served as Bishop of Capodistria (1684–1685).

== Biography ==
Pier Giulio Delfino was born in Rovigo, Italy on 3 April 1634. He was ordained a deacon on 25 October 1671 and ordained a priest on 28 October 1671. On 19 June 1684, he was appointed during the papacy of Pope Innocent XI as Bishop of Capodistria. On 24 June 1684, he was consecrated bishop by Alessandro Crescenzi (cardinal), Cardinal-Priest of Santa Prisca. He served as Bishop of Capodistria until his death on 24 April 1685.

Catholic Church titles
Preceded by Francesco Zeno	Bishop of Capodistria; 1684–1685	Succeeded by Paolo Naldini (bishop)
