= Charles Montecatini =

17th-century Italian Catholic bishop

Most Reverend Charles Montecatini
- Titular Archbishop of Chalcedon
- Church: Catholic Church
- In office: 1690–1699
- Predecessor: Marcello Durazzo
- Successor: Gaetano Stampa

Orders
- Ordination: 26 March 1656
- Consecration: 16 July 1690 by Flavio Chigi

Personal details
- Born: 1615 Ferrara, Italy
- Died: 20 March 1699 (aged 83–84)

Charles Montecatini (1615 – 20 March 1699) was a Roman Catholic prelate who served as Titular Archbishop of Chalcedon (1690–1699).

== Biography ==
Charles Montecatini was born in Ferrara, Italy in 1615 and ordained a priest in 26 March 1656. On 10 July 1690, he was appointed during the papacy of Pope Alexander VIII as Titular Archbishop of Chalcedon. On 16 July 1690, he was consecrated bishop by Flavio Chigi, Cardinal-Bishop of Porto e Santa Rufina, with Prospero Bottini, Titular Archbishop of Myra, and Giuseppe Bologna, Archbishop Emeritus of Benevento, serving as co-consecrators. He served as Titular Archbishop of Chalcedon until his death on 20 March 1699.

Catholic Church titles
Preceded by Marcello Durazzo	Titular Archbishop of Chalcedon; 1690–1699	Succeeded by Gaetano Stampa
