= Giovanni Andrea Monreale =

18th-century Roman Catholic bishop

Most Reverend Giovanni Andrea Monreale
- Archbishop of Reggio Calabria
- Church: Catholic Church
- In office: 1696–1726
- Predecessor: Martín Ibáñez y Villanueva
- Successor: Domingo Polou
- Previous post: Archbishop of Lanciano (1695–1696)

Orders
- Consecration: 10 Jul 1695 by Pier Matteo Petrucci

Personal details
- Born: 7 Oct 1653 Brindisi, Italy
- Died: July 1726 (age 72)

Giovanni Andrea Monreale (1653–1726) was a Roman Catholic prelate who served as Archbishop of Reggio Calabria (1696–1726) and Archbishop of Lanciano (1695–1696).

== Biography ==
Giovanni Andrea Monreale was born on 7 Oct 1653 in Brindisi, Italy. He was ordained a deacon on 8 Apr 1685, and a priest on 15 Apr 1685.

On 4 Jul 1695, he was appointed Archbishop of Lanciano by Pope Innocent XII. On 10 Jul 1695, he was consecrated bishop by Pier Matteo Petrucci, Cardinal-Priest of San Marcello al Corso, with Francesco Gori, Bishop of Catanzaro, and Domenico Diez de Aux, Bishop of Gerace, serving as co-consecrators.

On 21 May 1696, Pope Innocent XII appointed him Archbishop of Reggio Calabria. He served as Archbishop of Reggio Calabria until his death in July 1726.

== Episcopal succession ==
While bishop, he was the principal co-consecrator of:
- Giuseppe de Carolis, Bishop of Aquino (1699);
- Orazio Minimi Bishop of Segni (1699);
- Oronzio Filomarini, Bishop of Gallipoli (1700);
- Benito Noriega, Bishop of Acerra (1700);
- Giovanbattista Carafa Bishop of Nocera de' Pagani (1700);
- Marco Antonio de Rosa Bishop of Policastro (1705);
- Bartolomeo Gambadoro Bishop of Ruvo (1705); and
- Raffaele Maria Filamondo, Bishop of Sessa Aurunca (1705).

== External links and additional sources ==
- Cheney, David M. "Archdiocese of Lanciano-Ortona". Catholic-Hierarchy.org. (for Chronology of Bishops) ^{[self-published]}
- Chow, Gabriel. "Archdiocese of Lanciano-Ortona (Italy)". GCatholic.org. (for Chronology of Bishops) ^{[self-published]}
- Cheney, David M. "Archdiocese of Reggio Calabria-Bova". Catholic-Hierarchy.org. (for Chronology of Bishops) ^{[self-published]}
- Chow, Gabriel. "Metropolitan Archdiocese of Reggio Calabria–Bova". GCatholic.org. (for Chronology of Bishops) ^{[self-published]}

Catholic Church titles
Preceded by Manuel de la Torre Gutiérrez	Archbishop of Lanciano; 1695–1696	Succeeded by Bernabé de Castro
Preceded by Martín Ibáñez y Villanueva	Archbishop of Reggio Calabria; 1696–1726	Succeeded by Domingo Polou
