= Uberto Testa =

Roman Catholic prelate

Most Reverend Uberto Testa
- Bishop of Pula
- Church: Catholic Church
- Diocese: Diocese of Pula
- In office: 1618–1623
- Predecessor: Cornelio Sozomeno
- Successor: Innocentius Serpa

Personal details
- Born: 1569 Venice, Republic of Venice
- Died: August 1623 (age 54) Pula, Republic of Venice

Uberto Testa (1569 – August 1623) was an Italian Roman Catholic prelate who served as Bishop of Pula (1618–1623).

Uberto Testa was born in Venice, Republic of Venice. On 26 March 1618, he was appointed by Pope Paul V as Bishop of Pula. He served as Bishop of Pula until his death in August 1623.

== External links and additional sources ==
- Cheney, David M. "Diocese of Pula (Pola)". Catholic-Hierarchy.org. (for Chronology of Bishops) ^{[self-published]}
- Chow, Gabriel. "Diocese of Pula (Pola) (Croatia)". GCatholic.org. (for Chronology of Bishops) ^{[self-published]}

Catholic Church titles
Preceded by Cornelio Sozomeno	Bishop of Pula; 1618–1623	Succeeded by Innocentius Serpa
