= Martius Andreucci =

Most Reverend Martius Andreucci
- Bishop of Trogir
- Church: Catholic Church
- Diocese: Diocese of Trogir
- In office: 1604–1623
- Predecessor: Antonio Guidi
- Successor: Pace Giordano

Orders
- Consecration: 8 August 1604 by Girolamo Bernerio

Personal details
- Died: 1623 Trogir, Croatia

Martius Andreucci (died 1623) was a Roman Catholic prelate who served as Bishop of Trogir (1604–1623).

== Biography ==
On 19 July 1604, Martius Andreucci was appointed during the papacy of Pope Clement VIII as Bishop of Trogir. On 8 August 1604, he was consecrated bishop by Girolamo Bernerio, Cardinal-Bishop of Albano, with Agostino Quinzio, Bishop of Korčula, and Diodato Gentile, Bishop of Caserta serving as co-consecrators. He served as Bishop of Trogir until his death in 1623.

== See also ==
- Catholic Church in Croatia

== External links and additional sources ==
- Cheney, David M. "Diocese of Trogir (Traù)". Catholic-Hierarchy.org. (for Chronology of Bishops)^{self-published}
- Chow, Gabriel. "Titular Episcopal See of Trogir". GCatholic.org. (for Chronology of Bishops)^{self-published}

Catholic Church titles
Preceded by Antonio Guidi	Bishop of Trogir; 1604–1623	Succeeded by Pace Giordano
