= François Marie Sacco =

18th-century Roman Catholic bishop

Most Reverend François Marie Sacco
- Bishop of Brugnato
- Church: Catholic Church
- Diocese: Diocese of Brugnato
- In office: 1697–1721
- Predecessor: Giambattista Dadece
- Successor: Nicolò Leopoldo Lomellini
- Previous post: Bishop of Ajaccio (1695–1697)

Orders
- Consecration: 30 Nov 1695 by Pier Matteo Petrucci

Personal details
- Born: 1643 Savona, Italy
- Died: 21 Dec 1721 (age 78)

François Marie Sacco, C.R. or Francesco Maria Sacco (1643–1721) was a Roman Catholic prelate who served as Bishop of Brugnato (1697–1721) and Bishop of Ajaccio (1695–1697).

== Biography ==
François Marie Sacco was born in 1643 in Savona, Italy and ordained a priest in the Congregation of Clerics Regular of the Divine Providence. On 28 November 1695, he was appointed during the papacy of Pope Innocent XII as Bishop of Ajaccio. On 30 November 1695, he was consecrated bishop by Pier Matteo Petrucci, Cardinal-Priest of San Marcello al Corso, with Francesco Gori, Bishop of Catanzaro, and Giovanni Battista Visconti Aicardi, Bishop of Novara, serving as co-consecrators. On 27 March 1697, he was appointed during the papacy of Pope Innocent XII as Bishop of Brugnato. He served as Bishop of Brugnato until his death on 21 December 1721.

== Episcopal succession ==
While bishop, he was the principal co-consecrator of:
- Vincenzo Maria de Rossi, Bishop of Penne e Atri (1696);
- Giuseppe Maria Pignatelli, Bishop of Cava (1696);
- Lorenzo Fabri, Bishop of Fossombrone (1697); and
- Bernabé de Castro, Archbishop of Lanciano (1697).

== External links and additional sources ==
- Cheney, David M. "Diocese of Ajaccio". Catholic-Hierarchy.org. (for Chronology of Bishops) ^{[self-published]}
- Chow, Gabriel. "Diocese of Ajaccio (France)". GCatholic.org. (for Chronology of Bishops) ^{[self-published]}
- Cheney, David M. "Diocese of Brugnato". Catholic-Hierarchy.org. (for Chronology of Bishops) ^{[self-published]}
- Chow, Gabriel. "Diocese of Brugnato (Italy)". GCatholic.org. (for Chronology of Bishops) ^{[self-published]}

Catholic Church titles
| Preceded by Giovanni Battista Gentile | Bishop of Ajaccio; 1695–1697 | Succeeded by Pietro Spínola |
| Preceded by Giambattista Dadece | Bishop of Brugnato; 1697–1721 | Succeeded by Nicolò Leopoldo Lomellini |
