= Franciscus Manini =

17th-century Roman Catholic bishop

Most Reverend Franciscus Manini
- Bishop of Novigrad
- Church: Catholic Church
- Diocese: Diocese of Novigrad
- In office: 1607–1619
- Predecessor: Antonio Saraceno
- Successor: Eusebius Caimus

Orders
- Consecration: 8 Jul 1607 by Ludovico de Torres

Personal details
- Died: Sep 1619

Franciscus Manini (died 1619) was a Roman Catholic prelate who served as Bishop of Novigrad (1607–1619).

== Biography ==
On 4 Jul 1607, he was appointed during the papacy of Pope Paul V as Bishop of Novigrad. On 8 Jul 1607, he was consecrated bishop by Ludovico de Torres, Archbishop of Monreale, with Juan de Rada, Bishop of Patti, and Metello Bichi, Bishop Emeritus of Sovana, serving as co-consecrators. He served as Bishop of Novigrad until his death in Sep 1619.

== External links and additional sources ==
- Cheney, David M. "Diocese of Novigrad (Cittanova)". Catholic-Hierarchy.org. (for Chronology of Bishops) ^{[self-published]}
- Chow, Gabriel. "Titular Episcopal See of Novigrad (Croatia)". GCatholic.org. (for Chronology of Bishops) ^{[self-published]}

Catholic Church titles
Preceded by Antonio Saraceno	Bishop of Novigrad; 1607–1619	Succeeded by Eusebius Caimus
