= Antonio Correr (cardinal) =

Roman Catholic cardinal (1359 – 1445)

- Cardinal-Bishop of Ostia e Velletri
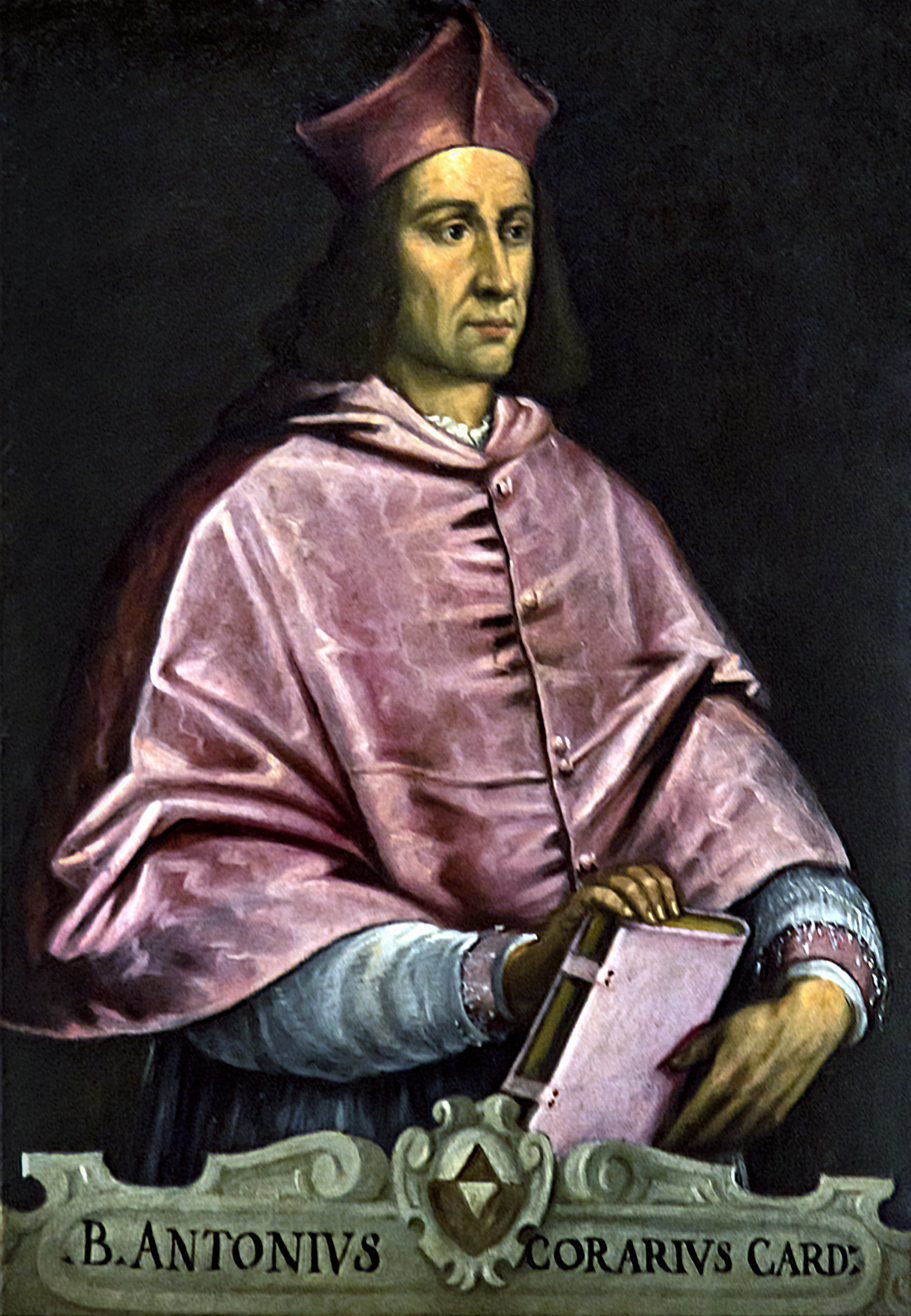
- Other post: Dean of the Sacred College of Cardinals (1438 – 1445)
- Previous posts: Latin Patriarch of Constantinople (1408 – 1409); Cardinal-Priest of San Pietro in Vincoli (1408 – 1431); Bishop of Bologna (1407 – 1408); Bishop of Modon (1405 – 1407)

Orders
- Consecration: 26 February 1407 by Pope Gregory XII
- Created cardinal: 9 May 1408 by Pope Gregory XII

Personal details
- Born: 15 July 1359 Venice, Republic of Venice
- Died: 19 January 1445 (aged 85) Padua, Republic of Venice

Antonio Correr (15 July 1359 – 19 January 1445) was a Roman Catholic cardinal who was appointed cardinal by his uncle Pope Gregory XII during the period of the Great Western Schism.

== Biography ==
Correr was born in Venice, the son of Filippo Correr and wife Cassandra Venier. He was Cardinal-nephew of Pope Gregory XII, Pope of the Roman Obedience in the period of the Great Western Schism, eldest brother of Filippo Correr. He was also cousin of Pope Eugene IV, son of his father Filippo's sister Bariola and Angelo Condulmer. His last name is listed also as Corrario and Corraro.

Correr was one of the founders of the Congregation of the Canons Regular of San Giorgio in Alga in his native city of Venice. In 1405, he was named bishop of Modon, and on 26 February 1407 he was consecrated bishop by Pope Gregory XII with Agostino da Lanzano, Bishop of Spoleto, Guglielmo della Vigna, Bishop of Todi, Giacomo Ciera, Bishop of Chiron, and Antonio Correr, Bishop of Asolo, serving as co-consecrators. Two years later his uncle, Pope Gregory XII, transferred him to the see of Bologna. He could not take possession of the latter see due to opposition of Cardinal Baldassare Cossa (later Antipope John XXIII), who did not recognized his nomination, because he considered Gregory XII an antipope.

On 9 May 1408, Antonio was created Cardinal Priest of San Pietro in Vincoli by his uncle and a few months later was promoted to Cardinal Bishop of Porto. He was also administrator of the see of Fiesole (1408–10) and Latin Patriarch of Constantinople (1408–09). Correr was Camerlengo of the Holy Roman Church from 1407 until July 1415. Antonio attended the Council of Constance as representative of the Roman Obedience of the Sacred College, and he participated in the Papal conclave, 1417 and the Papal conclave, 1431. Archpriest of the patriarchal Vatican Basilica 1420–1434, he served also as papal legate in Perugia (1425) and in Tuscany (1431). Antonio was administrator of the sees of Novigrad (1420–21), Rimini (1435) and Cervia (1435–40). New pope Eugene IV (his cousin) transferred him to the suburbicarian see of Ostia e Velletri on 14 March 1431. He became Dean of the Sacred College of Cardinals at the death of Giordano Orsini on 29 May 1438. Author of an unpublished history of his times, he died at Padua, but his remains were transferred to Venice where he was buried in the church of San Giorgio in Alga.

Catholic Church titles
Preceded by Lodovico Morosini	Bishop of Modon; 1405–1407	Succeeded by
Preceded by Bartolomeo Raimondi	Bishop of Bologna; 1407	Succeeded by Niccolò Albergati
Preceded by	Cardinal-Priest of San Pietro in Vincoli; 1408–1409	Succeeded by
Preceded by Berenguer de Anglesola	Cardinal-Bishop of Porto e Santa Rufina; 1409–1431	Succeeded by
Preceded by	Apostolic Administrator of Novigrad; 1420–1421	Succeeded by Daniel Rampi Scoto
Preceded by Jean Allarmet de Brogny	Cardinal-Bishop of Ostia e Velletri; 1431–1445	Succeeded by Juan de Cervantes
Preceded by	Apostolic Administrator of Rimini; 1435	Succeeded by Cristoforo di San Marcello
Preceded by Cristoforo di San Marcello	Apostolic Administrator of Cervia; 1435–1440	Succeeded by Pietro Barbo
