= Giovanni Cito =

Italian Roman Catholic prelate

Most Reverend Giovanni Cito
- Bishop of Lettere-Gragnano
- Church: Catholic Church
- Diocese: Diocese of Lettere-Gragnano
- Predecessor: Antonio Molinari (bishop)
- Successor: Domenico Antonio Gagliano

Orders
- Ordination: 22 March 1671
- Consecration: 28 December 1698 by Pier Matteo Petrucci

Personal details
- Born: 20 March 1633 Naples, Italy
- Died: 15 October 1708 (age 75)

Giovanni Cito (1633–1708) was a Roman Catholic prelate who served as Bishop of Lettere-Gragnano (1698–1708).

== Biography ==
Giovanni Cito was born in Naples, Italy on 20 March 1633. He was ordained a deacon on 15 March 1671 and ordained a priest on 22 March 1671. On 22 December 1698, he was appointed during the papacy of Pope Innocent XII as Bishop of Lettere-Gragnano. On 28 December 1698, he was consecrated bishop by Pier Matteo Petrucci, Cardinal-Priest of San Marcello, with Tommaso Guzzoni, Bishop of Sora, and Domenico Belisario de Bellis, Bishop of Molfetta, serving as co-consecrators. He served as Bishop of Lettere-Gragnano until his death on 15 October 1708.

== External links and additional sources ==
- Cheney, David M. "Diocese of Lettere (-Gragnano)". Catholic-Hierarchy.org. (for Chronology of Bishops) ^{[self-published]}
- Chow, Gabriel. "Titular Episcopal See of Lettere (Italy)". GCatholic.org. (for Chronology of Bishops) ^{[self-published]}

Catholic Church titles
Preceded by Antonio Molinari (bishop)	Bishop of Lettere-Gragnano; 1698–1708	Succeeded by Domenico Antonio Gagliano
