= Cornelio Sozomeno =

Bishop of Pula in Croatia (d. 1617)

Most Reverend Cornelio Sozomeno
- Bishop of Pula
- Church: Catholic Church
- Diocese: Diocese of Pula
- In office: 1605–1617
- Predecessor: Claudius Sozomenus
- Successor: Uberto Testa

Orders
- Consecration: 11 September 1605 by Giovanni Delfino (seniore)

Personal details
- Died: 1617 Venice, Republic of Venice

Cornelio Sozomeno (Latin:Kornelios Sozomenus) (died 1617) was an Italian Roman Catholic prelate who served as Bishop of Pula (1605–1617).

== Biography ==
Cornelio Sozomeno was born in Venice, Republic of Venice. On 31 August 1605, Cornelio Sozomeno was appointed by Pope Paul V as Bishop of Pula. On 11 September 1605, he was consecrated bishop by Giovanni Delfino (seniore), Bishop of Vicenza with Fabio Biondi, Titular Patriarch of Jerusalem, and Metello Bichi, Bishop of Sovana, serving as co-consecrators. He served as Bishop of Pula until his death in 1617 in Venice, Italy.

While bishop, he was the principal co-consecrator of Fabrizio Verallo, Bishop of San Severo (1606), Vincenzo Meligne, Bishop of Ostuni (1606), and Giovanni Battista Bonetti (Berosi), Bishop of Narni (1606).

== External links and additional sources ==
- Cheney, David M. "Diocese of Pula (Pola)". Catholic-Hierarchy.org. (for Chronology of Bishops) ^{[self-published]}
- Chow, Gabriel. "Diocese of Pula (Pola) (Croatia)". GCatholic.org. (for Chronology of Bishops) ^{[self-published]}

Catholic Church titles
Preceded by Claudius Sozomenus	Bishop of Pula; 1605–1617	Succeeded by Uberto Testa
