= Domenico Mudazio =

Most Reverend Domenico Mudazio
- Bishop of Chiron
- Church: Catholic Church
- Diocese: Diocese of Chiron
- In office: 1549–1572
- Predecessor: Giovanni Battista Bernini
- Successor: Giovanni Francesco Pozzo

Personal details
- Died: 1617 Chersonissos, Crete

Domenico Mudazio (died 1617) was a Roman Catholic prelate who served as Bishop of Chiron (1605–1617).

== Biography ==
On 10 Oct 1605, Domenico Mudazio was appointed during the papacy of Pope Paul V as Bishop of Chiron. He served as Bishop of Chiron until his death in 1617.

Catholic Church titles
Preceded by Giovanni Battista Bernini	Bishop of Chiron; 1605–1617	Succeeded by Giovanni Francesco Pozzo
