= Marino Badoer =

Roman Catholic prelate

Most Reverend Marino Badoer
- Bishop of Pula
- Church: Catholic Church
- Diocese: Diocese of Pula
- In office: 1641–1648
- Predecessor: Giulio Saraceni
- Successor: Alvise Marcello

Orders
- Consecration: 7 July 1641 by Giulio Cesare Sacchetti

Personal details
- Died: 1648 Pula, Republic of Venice (modern-day Croatia)

Marino Badoer, O.S.B. (died 1648) was a Roman Catholic prelate who served as Bishop of Pula (1641–1648).

== Biography ==
On 8 January 1634, Marino Badoer was ordained a priest in the Order of Saint Benedict. On 1 July 1641, he was appointed by Pope Urban VIII as Bishop of Pula. On 7 July 1641, he was consecrated bishop by Giulio Cesare Sacchetti, Cardinal-Priest of Santa Susanna with Emilio Bonaventura Altieri, Bishop of Camerino, and Bernardo Florio, Bishop of Canea, serving as co-consecrators. He served as Bishop of Pula until his death in 1648.

== External links and additional sources ==
- Cheney, David M. "Diocese of Pula (Pola)". Catholic-Hierarchy.org. (for Chronology of Bishops) ^{[self-published]}
- Chow, Gabriel. "Diocese of Pula (Pola) (Croatia)". GCatholic.org. (for Chronology of Bishops) ^{[self-published]}

Catholic Church titles
| Preceded by Giulio Saraceni | Bishop of Pula; 1641–1648 | Succeeded by Alvise Marcello |
