= Orazio Minimi =

18th-century Roman Catholic bishop

Most Reverend Orazio Minimi
- Bishop of Segni
- Church: Catholic Church
- In office: 1699–1701
- Predecessor: Francesco Maria Giannotti
- Successor: Pietro Corbelli

Orders
- Ordination: 29 Sep 1670
- Consecration: 11 Oct 1699 by Pier Matteo Petrucci

Personal details
- Born: 9 Feb 1646 Viterbo, Italy
- Died: July 1701 (age 55)

Orazio Minimi (1646–1701) was a Roman Catholic prelate who served as Bishop of Segni (1699–1701).

== Biography ==
Orazio Minimi was born in Viterbo, Italy and ordained a priest on 29 Sep 1670. On 5 Oct 1699, he was appointed during the papacy of Pope Innocent XII as Bishop of Segni. On 11 Oct 1699, he was consecrated bishop by Pier Matteo Petrucci, Cardinal-Priest of San Marcello al Corso, with Giovanni Andrea Monreale, Archbishop of Reggio Calabria, and Tommaso Guzzoni, Bishop of Sora, serving as co-consecrators. He served as Bishop of Segni until his death in July 1701.

== External links and additional sources ==
- Cheney, David M. "Diocese of Segni". Catholic-Hierarchy.org. (for Chronology of Bishops) ^{[self-published]}
- Chow, Gabriel. "Diocese of Segni (Italy)". GCatholic.org. (for Chronology of Bishops) ^{[self-published]}

Catholic Church titles
Preceded by Francesco Maria Giannotti	Bishop of Segni; 1699–1701	Succeeded by Pietro Corbelli
