= Giuseppe de Carolis =

18th-century Roman Catholic bishop

Most Reverend Giuseppe de Carolis
- Bishop of Aquino e Pontecorvo; Titular Archbishop of Tyana
- Church: Catholic Church
- Diocese: Diocese of Aquino e Pontecorvo
- In office: 1725–1742
- Predecessor: Giovanni Ferrari (bishop)
- Successor: Francesco Antonio Spadea

Orders
- Consecration: 11 Oct 1699 by Pier Matteo Petrucci

Personal details
- Born: 14 Jul 1652 Pofi, Italy
- Died: 5 Jan 1742 (age 89)

Giuseppe de Carolis (1652–1742) was a Roman Catholic prelate who served as Bishop of Aquino e Pontecorvo (1725–1742) and Bishop of Aquino (1699–1725).

== Biography ==
Giuseppe de Carolis was born on 5 Oct 1699 in Pofi, Italy. On 5 Oct 1699, he was appointed during the papacy of Pope Innocent XII as Bishop of Aquino. On 11 Oct 1699, he was consecrated bishop by Pier Matteo Petrucci, Cardinal-Priest of San Marcello al Corso, with Giovanni Andrea Monreale, Archbishop of Reggio Calabria, and Tommaso Guzzoni, Bishop of Sora, serving as co-consecrators. On 23 Jun 1725, he was appointed during the papacy of Pope Benedict XIII as Bishop of Aquino e Pontecorvo after the diocese was merged with the Diocese of Aquino. On 13 Jul 1725, he was named Titular Archbishop of Tyana. He served as Bishop of Aquino e Pontecorvo until his death on 5 Jan 1742.

== External links and additional sources ==
- Cheney, David M. "Diocese of Aquino e Pontecorvo". Catholic-Hierarchy.org. (for Chronology of Bishops) ^{[self-published]}
- Chow, Gabriel. "Diocese of Aquino (Italy)". GCatholic.org. (for Chronology of Bishops) ^{[self-published]}
- Cheney, David M. "Tyana (Titular See)". Catholic-Hierarchy.org. (for Chronology of Bishops) ^{[self-published]}
- Chow, Gabriel. "Titular Metropolitan See of Tyana (Turkey)". GCatholic.org. (for Chronology of Bishops) ^{[self-published]}

Catholic Church titles
Preceded by Giovanni Ferrari (bishop)	Bishop of Aquino then Bishop of Aquino e Pontecorvo; 1699–1725 and 1725–1742	Succeeded by Francesco Antonio Spadea
Preceded by	Titular Archbishop of Tyana; 1725–1742	Succeeded by Simone Gritti
