= Luca Trapani =

18th-century Roman Catholic bishop

Most Reverend Luca Trapani
- Church: Catholic Church
- Diocese: Diocese of Tricarico
- In office: 1718–1719
- Predecessor: Francesco Antonio Leopardi
- Successor: Simeone Veglini
- Previous post: Bishop of Ischia (1698–1718)

Orders
- Ordination: 2 Mar 1687
- Consecration: 28 Dec 1698 by Pier Matteo Petrucci

Personal details
- Born: 26 March 1664 Naples, Italy
- Died: September 1719 (aged 55)

Luca Trapani (1664–1719) was a Roman Catholic prelate who served as Bishop of Tricarico (1718–1719) and Bishop of Ischia (1698–1718).

== Biography ==
Luca Trapani was born on 26 Mar 1664 in Naples, Italy and successively ordained a deacon on 24 Feb 1687 and a priest on 2 Mar 1687. On 22 Dec 1698, he was appointed during the papacy of Pope Innocent XII as Bishop of Ischia. On 28 Dec 1698, he was consecrated bishop by Pier Matteo Petrucci, Cardinal-Priest of San Marcello al Corso, with Tommaso Guzzoni, Bishop of Sora, and Domenico Belisario de Bellis, Bishop of Molfetta, serving as co-consecrators. On 24 Jan 1718, he was appointed during the papacy of Pope Clement XI as Bishop of Tricarico. He served as Bishop of Tricarico until his death in September 1719.

While bishop, he was the principal co-consecrator of Antonio Sellent, Titular Bishop of Adraa and Auxiliary Bishop of Cagliari (1713).

== External links and additional sources ==
- Cheney, David M. "Diocese of Ischia". Catholic-Hierarchy.org. (for Chronology of Bishops) ^{[self-published]}
- Chow, Gabriel. "Diocese of Ischia". GCatholic.org. (for Chronology of Bishops) ^{[self-published]}
- Cheney, David M. "Diocese of Tricarico". Catholic-Hierarchy.org. (for Chronology of Bishops) ^{[self-published]}
- Chow, Gabriel. "Diocese of Tricarico (Italy)". GCatholic.org. (for Chronology of Bishops) ^{[self-published]}

Catholic Church titles
Preceded by Michelangelo Cotignola	Bishop of Ischia; 1698–1718	Succeeded by Gianmaria Capecelatro
Preceded by Francesco Antonio Leopardi	Bishop of Tricarico; 1718–1719	Succeeded by Simeone Veglini
