= Pietro Leon =

Most Reverend Pietro Leon
- Bishop of Ceneda
- Church: Catholic Church
- Diocese: Diocese of Ceneda
- In office: 1445–1474
- Predecessor: Antonio Correr (bishop)
- Successor: Nicolò Trevisan
- Previous post: Bishop of Ossero (1436–1445)

Personal details
- Died: 1474 Ceneda, Italy

Pietro Leon (died 1474) was a Roman Catholic prelate who served as Bishop of Ceneda (1445–1474) and Bishop of Ossero (1436–1445).

== Biography ==
On 6 February 1436, Pietro Leon was appointed Bishop of Ossero by Pope Eugene IV. On 4 June 1445, he was appointed Bishop of Ceneda by Pope Eugene IV. He served as Bishop of Ceneda until his death in 1474.

== External links and additional sources ==
- Cheney, David M. "Diocese of Vittorio Veneto (Ceneda)". Catholic-Hierarchy.org. (for Chronology of Bishops) ^{[self-published]}
- Chow, Gabriel. "Diocese of Vittorio Veneto (Ceneda)(Italy)". GCatholic.org. (for Chronology of Bishops) ^{[self-published]}

Catholic Church titles
Preceded by	Bishop of Ossero; 1436–1445	Succeeded by Simeon de Valle
Preceded by Antonio Correr (bishop)	Bishop of Ceneda; 1445–1474	Succeeded by Nicolò Trevisan
