= Altobello de Averoldi =

Italian Roman Catholic prelate

Most Reverend Altobello de Averoldi
- Bishop of Pula
- Portrait by Francesco Francia, c. 1505
- Church: Catholic Church
- Diocese: Diocese of Pula
- In office: 1497–1531
- Predecessor: Michele Orsini
- Successor: Giovanni Battista Vergerio

Orders
- Consecration: 2 April 1475 by Marco Barbo

Personal details
- Died: 1 November 1531 Pula, Italy

Altobello de Averoldi (died 1 November 1531) was a Roman Catholic prelate who served as Bishop of Pula (1497–1531).

== Biography ==
On 13 November 1497, Altobello de Averoldi was appointed by Pope Alexander VI as Bishop of Pula. On 6 May 1498, he was consecrated bishop. He served as Bishop of Pula until his death on 1 November 1531.

== External links and additional sources ==
- Cheney, David M. "Diocese of Pula (Pola)". Catholic-Hierarchy.org. (for Chronology of Bishops) ^{[self-published]}
- Chow, Gabriel. "Diocese of Pula (Pola) (Croatia)". GCatholic.org. (for Chronology of Bishops) ^{[self-published]}

Catholic Church titles
Preceded by Michele Orsini	Bishop of Pula; 1497–1531	Succeeded by Giovanni Battista Vergerio
