= Innocentius Serpa =

Roman Catholic bishop

Most Reverend Innocentius Serpa
- Bishop of Pula
- Church: Catholic Church
- Diocese: Diocese of Pula
- In office: 1624–1625
- Predecessor: Uberto Testa
- Successor: Rodolfo Rodolfi-Sforza

Orders
- Consecration: 18 February 1624 by Pietro Valier

Personal details
- Born: 1573 Vicenza, Republic of Venice
- Died: August 1625 (age 52) Pula, Republic of Venice

Innocentius Serpa, C.R.L. (1573 – August 1625) was an Italian Roman Catholic prelate who served as Bishop of Pula (1624–1625).

== Biography ==
Innocentius Serpa was born in Venice, Republic of Venice and ordained a priest in the Canons Regular of the Lateran. On 12 February 1624, he was appointed by Pope Urban VIII as Bishop of Pula. On 18 February 1624, he was consecrated bishop by Pietro Valier, Bishop of Ceneda with Agostino Gradenigo, Bishop of Feltre, and Vincenzo Giustiniani (bishop), Bishop of Treviso, serving as co-consecrators. He served as Bishop of Pula until his death in August 1625.

== External links and additional sources ==
- Cheney, David M. "Diocese of Pula (Pola)". Catholic-Hierarchy.org. (for Chronology of Bishops) ^{[self-published]}
- Chow, Gabriel. "Diocese of Pula (Pola) (Croatia)". GCatholic.org. (for Chronology of Bishops) ^{[self-published]}

Catholic Church titles
Preceded by Uberto Testa	Bishop of Pula; 1624–1625	Succeeded by Rodolfo Rodolfi-Sforza
