= Bernabé de Castro =

Most Reverend Bernabé de Castro
- Archbishop of Brindisi
- Church: Catholic Church
- Archdiocese: Archdiocese of Brindisi
- In office: 1700–1707
- Predecessor: Agustín Antonio de Arellano
- Successor: Pablo Vilana Perlas
- Previous post: Archbishop of Lanciano (1697–1700)

Orders
- Consecration: 3 March 1697 by Pier Matteo Petrucci

Personal details
- Born: 15 June 1644 Manrique
- Died: 11 December 1707 (age 63) Brindisi, Italy

Bernabé de Castro, O.S.A. (1644–1707) was a Roman Catholic prelate who served as Archbishop of Brindisi (1700–1707) and Archbishop of Lanciano (1697–1700).

== Biography ==
Bernabé de Castro was born in Manrique, Italy on 15 June 1644 and ordained a priest in the Order of Saint Augustine.

On 25 February 1697, he was appointed Archbishop of Lanciano by Pope Innocent XII. On 3 March 1697, he was consecrated bishop by Pier Matteo Petrucci, Cardinal-Priest of San Marcello, with Carlo Loffredo, Archbishop of Bari-Canosa, and François Marie Sacco, Bishop of Ajaccio, serving as co-consecrators.

On 15 December 1700, he was appointed Archbishop of Brindisi by Pope Clement XI. He served as Archbishop of Brindisi until his death on 11 December 1707.

== Episcopal succession ==
While bishop, he was the principal co-consecrator of:

- Tommaso Antonio Scotti, Archbishop of Dubrovnik (1701); and
- Francesco Frosini, Bishop of Pistoia e Prato (1701).

Catholic Church titles
Preceded by Giovanni Andrea Monreale	Archbishop of Lanciano; 1697–1700	Succeeded by Giovanni Uva
Preceded by Agustín Antonio de Arellano	Archbishop of Brindisi; 1700–1707	Succeeded by Pablo Vilana Perlas
