= Giovanni Battista Vergerio =

Bishop of Pula, Croatia (d. 1548)

Most Reverend Giovanni Battista Vergerio
- Bishop of Pula
- Church: Catholic Church
- Diocese: Diocese of Pula
- In office: 1497–1531
- Predecessor: Altobello de Averoldi
- Successor: Antonio Elio

Personal details
- Died: 1548 Pula, Italy

Giovanni Battista Vergerio (died 1548) was a Roman Catholic prelate who served as Bishop of Pula (1497–1531).

== Biography ==
On 5 January 1532, Giovanni Battista Vergerio was appointed by Pope Clement VII as Bishop of Pula. He served as Bishop of Pula until his death in 1548.

While bishop, he was the principal consecrator of Pietro Paolo Vergerio, Bishop of Modruš.

== External links and additional sources ==
- Cheney, David M. "Diocese of Pula (Pola)". Catholic-Hierarchy.org. (for Chronology of Bishops) ^{[self-published]}
- Chow, Gabriel. "Diocese of Pula (Pola) (Croatia)". GCatholic.org. (for Chronology of Bishops) ^{[self-published]}

Catholic Church titles
Preceded by Altobello de Averoldi	Bishop of Pula; 1497–1531	Succeeded by Antonio Elio
