= Ambrosio Fracassini =

Roman Catholic prelate

Most Reverend Ambrosio Fracassini
- Bishop of Pula
- Church: Catholic Church
- Diocese: Diocese of Pula
- In office: 1663
- Predecessor: Gaspare Cattaneo
- Successor: Bernardino Corniani

Orders
- Consecration: 27 Mar 1663 by Scipione Pannocchieschi d'Elci

Personal details
- Born: 8 Dec 1597 Brescia, Italy
- Died: 22 Sep 1663 (age 65) Pula, Italy

Ambrosio Fracassini, O.P. (died 1663) was a Roman Catholic prelate who served as Bishop of Pula (1663).

== Biography ==
Ambrosio Fracassini was born in Brescia, Italy on 8 Dec 1597 and ordained a priest in the Order of Preachers. On 12 Mar 1663, he was appointed by Pope Alexander VII as Bishop of Pula. On 27 Mar 1663, he was consecrated bishop by Scipione Pannocchieschi d'Elci, Archbishop of Pisa. He served as Bishop of Pula until his death on 22 Sep 1663.

== External links and additional sources ==
- Cheney, David M. "Diocese of Pula (Pola)". Catholic-Hierarchy.org. (for Chronology of Bishops) ^{[self-published]}
- Chow, Gabriel. "Diocese of Pula (Pola) (Croatia)". GCatholic.org. (for Chronology of Bishops) ^{[self-published]}

Catholic Church titles
Preceded by Gaspare Cattaneo	Bishop of Pula; 1663	Succeeded by Bernardino Corniani
