= Rodolfo Rodolfi-Sforza =

Roman Catholic prelate

Most Reverend Rodolfo Rodolfi-Sforza
- Bishop of Pula
- Church: Catholic Church
- Diocese: Diocese of Pula
- In office: 1625–1626
- Predecessor: Innocentius Serpa
- Successor: Giulio Saraceni

Orders
- Ordination: 22 December 1624

Personal details
- Born: 1594 Padua, Italy
- Died: 1626 (age 32) Pula, Italy

Rodolfo Rodolfi-Sforza (1594–1626) was a Roman Catholic prelate who served as Bishop of Pula (1625–1626).

== Biography ==
Rodolfi-Sforza was born in Padua, Italy and ordained a priest on 22 December 1624. On 3 March 1625, he was appointed by Pope Urban VIII as Bishop of Pula. He served as Bishop of Pula until his death in 1626.

== External links and additional sources ==
- Cheney, David M. "Diocese of Pula (Pola)". Catholic-Hierarchy.org. (for Chronology of Bishops) ^{[self-published]}
- Chow, Gabriel. "Diocese of Pula (Pola) (Croatia)". GCatholic.org. (for Chronology of Bishops) ^{[self-published]}

Catholic Church titles
Preceded by Innocentius Serpa	Bishop of Pula; 1625–1626	Succeeded by Giulio Saraceni
