= Antonio Correr (bishop) =

Roman catholic prelate (1406-1445)

Most Reverend Antonio Correr
- Bishop of Ceneda
- Church: Catholic Church
- Diocese: Diocese of Ceneda
- In office: 1409–1445
- Predecessor: Pietro Marcelli
- Successor: Pietro Leon
- Previous post: Bishop of Asolo (1406–1409)

Personal details
- Born: 1378
- Died: 1445 (age 67) Ceneda, Italy

Antonio Correr, O.P. (1378–1445) was a Roman Catholic prelate who served as Bishop of Ceneda (1409–1445) and Bishop of Asolo (1406–1409).

== Biography ==
Antonio Correr was born in 1378 and ordained a priest in the Order of Preachers. On 24 May 1406, he was appointed Bishop of Asolo by Pope Innocent VII. On 15 Jul 1409, he was appointed during the papacy of Pope Gregory XII as Bishop of Ceneda. He served as Bishop of Ceneda until his death in 1445. While bishop, he was the principal co-consecrator of Antonio Correr, Bishop of Modon (1407).

== External links and additional sources ==
- Cheney, David M. "Diocese of Vittorio Veneto (Ceneda)". Catholic-Hierarchy.org. (for Chronology of Bishops) ^{[self-published]}
- Chow, Gabriel. "Diocese of Vittorio Veneto (Ceneda)(Italy)". GCatholic.org. (for Chronology of Bishops) ^{[self-published]}

Catholic Church titles
Preceded by	Bishop of Asolo; 1406–1409	Succeeded by
Preceded by Pietro Marcelli	Bishop of Ceneda; 1409–1445	Succeeded by Pietro Leon
