= Giovanni Francesco Pozzo =

Roman Catholic bishop

Most Reverend Giovanni Francesco Pozzo
- Bishop of Chiron
- Church: Catholic Church
- Diocese: Diocese of Chiron
- In office: 1617–1619
- Predecessor: Domenico Mudazio
- Successor: Pietro Colletti

Personal details
- Died: 1619 Chersonissos, Crete

Giovanni Francesco Pozzo (died 1619) was a Roman Catholic prelate who served as Bishop of Chiron (1617–1619).

== Biography ==
On 2 Oct 1617, Giovanni Francesco Pozzo was appointed during the papacy of Pope Paul V as Bishop of Chiron. He served as Bishop of Chiron until his death in 1619.

Catholic Church titles
Preceded by Domenico Mudazio	Bishop of Chiron; 1617–1619	Succeeded by Pietro Colletti
