= Matteo Barbabianca =

Roman Catholic prelate

- Bishop of Pula
- Church: Catholic Church
- Diocese: Diocese of Pula
- In office: 1567–1582
- Predecessor: Antonio Elio
- Successor: Claudius Sozomenus

Orders
- Consecration: 1 November 1567 bishop by Giovanni Delfino

Personal details
- Born: c. 1532 Koper
- Died: 11 March 1582 (aged 49–50) Pula

Matteo Barbabianca (c. 1532 – 1582) was a Roman Catholic prelate who served as Bishop of Pula from 1567 to his death, implementing in that town the reforms of the Council of Trent.

== Biography ==
Matteo Barbabianca was born in Koper to a local noble family on about 1532. He moved to Roma, and he graduated in utroque iure. He returned to his hometown becoming an archdeacon.

On 28 April 1567, Barbabianca was appointed by Pope Pius V as Bishop of Pula. He was consecrated bishop by Giovanni Delfino (bishop of Torcello) on 1 November 1567 in the church of Santa Maria degli Angeli, Murano.

His main actions were the introduction and acceptance into the diocese of the new decrees of the Council of Trent, reforming the customs of the clergy and renewing the religious spirit; for their correct application, he called a first diocesan synod in Albona in 1576 and a second two years later.

Bishop Barbabianca also tried to implement the Tridentine reform by combating the ignorance of the clergy and by establishing obligatory meetings, of the type of those implemented in Milan by Carlo Borromeo, where the major questions of dogmatic and moral theology were explained. Furthermore, following the proposal made on 14 January 1580 by the apostolic visitor Agostino Valier, he quickly established the diocesan seminary, which however survived its founder for a few years and was closed in 1592.

His reforming work was prematurely cut short by his death: caught by fever while exercising his ministry near Pula, he died on 3 November 1582.

== See also ==
- Catholic Church in Croatia
