= Giacomo Cantelmo =

Italian Roman Catholic cardinal

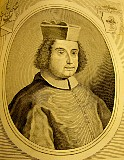
Giacomo Cantelmo

Giacomo Cantelmo (13 June 1645 – 11 December 1702) was a Roman Catholic cardinal from 1690 to 1702.

== Biography ==
Giacomo Cantelmo was born in Naples on 13 June 1645, the son of Fabrizio Cantelmo, 5th Duke of Popoli and prince of Pettorano, and Beatrice Brancia, duchess of Padula. The family's surname is sometimes given as Cantelmo-Stuart because they claimed a relationship to James II of England. Restaino Cantelmo-Stuart was his younger brother.

Prior to attending university, Cantelmo had mastered Latin, Greek, and Hebrew. He was educated at the Sapienza University of Rome and at the University of Bologna.

Pope Innocent XI named him abbot in commendam of San Antonio di Vienna in Naples. On 4 June 1678, he was named inquisitor of Malta. He served as Referendary of the Apostolic Signatura.

On 27 September 1683, he was elected Titular Archbishop of Caesarea. He was consecrated as a bishop by Cardinal Carlo Pio di Savoia, Titular Bishop of Sabina, on 3 October 1683. He became nuncio to Vienna in 1683. He then served as nuncio to Switzerland from 18 April 1685 to 10 December 1687. On 23 October 1688, he was named nuncio extraordinary to Poland. He became nuncio extraordinary to Austria on 25 October 1689. He then returned to Rome to become secretary of the Sacred Congregation for Bishops and Regulars.

On 23 February 1690, he was named extraordinary nuncio to the imperial election held at Augsburg and which elected Joseph of Austria as King of the Romans.

In the consistory held on 13 February 1690, Pope Alexander VIII created him a cardinal priest. On 10 April 1690, he attended Joseph's coronation as King of the Romans; on the same day he received the red hat, was awarded the titular church of Santi Marcellino e Pietro al Laterano and named papal legate to Urbino. He was transferred to the metropolitan see of Capua on 27 September 1690, receiving the pallium on 11 December 1690.

He participated in the papal conclave of 1691, which elected Pope Innocent XII. The new pope transferred him to the metropolitan see of Naples, with Cantelmo receiving the pallium on 8 August 1691. There he held a diocesan synod on Pentecost 1694. He also convened a provincial synod, attended by 13 bishops, and opened on 7 June 1699.

He participated in the papal conclave of 1700, which elected Pope Clement XI. The new pope named him Camerlengo of the Sacred College of Cardinals, with Cantelmo serving from 3 February 1700 to 23 January 1702.

He died in Naples on 11 December 1702.

Catholic Church titles
Preceded by Savo Millini	Titular Archbishop of Caesarea in Palaestina; 1683–1690	Succeeded by Lorenzo Casoni
Preceded by Odoardo Cibo	Apostolic Nuncio to Switzerland; 1685–1687	Succeeded by Bartolomeo Menatti
Preceded by Opizio Pallavicini	Apostolic Nuncio to Poland; 1687–1689	Succeeded by Francesco Giambattista Bonesana
Preceded by Francesco Buonvisi	Apostolic Nuncio to Emperor; 1689	Succeeded by Sebastiano Antonio Tanara
Preceded by	Secretary of the Congregation of Bishops and Regulars; 1689	Succeeded by
Preceded by Girolamo Boncompagni	Cardinal-Priest of Santi Marcellino e Pietro; 1690–1702	Succeeded by Francesco Pignatelli (seniore)
Preceded by Gasparo Cavalieri	Archbishop of Capua; 1690–1691	Succeeded by Giuseppe Bologna
Preceded by Antonio Pignatelli del Rastrello	Archbishop of Naples; 1691–1702	Succeeded by Giambattista Patrizi
Preceded by Bandino Panciatici	Camerlengo of the Sacred College of Cardinals; 1700—1702	Succeeded by Toussaint de Forbin-Janson
