= Bongiovanni da Recanati =

Most Reverend Bongiovanni da Recanati
- Archbishop of Dubrovnik
- Church: Catholic Church
- Archdiocese: Archdiocese of Dubrovnik
- In office: 1440–1460
- Predecessor: Antonio da Rieti
- Successor: Francesco Petri

Orders
- Consecration: 18 September 1440 by Biaggio Molino

Personal details
- Died: 2 September 1460 Dubrovnik, Croatia

Bongiovanni da Recanati or Giacomo Veneri de Racaneto (died 1460) was a Roman Catholic prelate who served as Archbishop of Dubrovnik (1440–1460).

On 5 September 1440, Bongiovanni da Recanati was appointed during the papacy of Pope Eugene IV as Archbishop of Dubrovnik. On 18 September 1440, he was consecrated bishop by Biaggio Molino, Titular Patriarch of Jerusalem, with Daniel Rampi Scoto, Bishop of Concordia, and Zanone Castiglione, Bishop of Bayeux, serving as co-consecrators. He served as Archbishop of Dubrovnik until his death on September 2nd 1460.

== External links and additional sources ==
- Cheney, David M. "Diocese of Dubrovnik (Ragusa)". Catholic-Hierarchy.org. (for Chronology of Bishops) ^{[self-published]}
- Chow, Gabriel. "Diocese of Dubrovnik (Croatia)". GCatholic.org. (for Chronology of Bishops) ^{[self-published]}

Catholic Church titles
Preceded by Antonio da Rieti	Archbishop of Dubrovnik; 1440–1460	Succeeded by Francesco Petri
