= Joannes Cuppari =

Croatian Roman Catholic prelate

Most Reverend Joannes Cuppari
- Bishop of Trogir
- Church: Catholic Church
- Diocese: Diocese of Trogir
- In office: 1684–1694
- Predecessor: Giovanni de Andreis
- Successor: Joseph Simeon Cavagnini

Orders
- Ordination: 10 August 1661
- Consecration: 25 June 1684 by Alessandro Crescenzi (cardinal)

Personal details
- Born: 9 September 1635 Split, Croatia
- Died: 1694 (age 58) Trogir, Croatia

Joannes Cuppari also Ivan Cupareo (9 September 1635 – 1694) was a Roman Catholic prelate who served as Bishop of Trogir (1684–1694).

== Biography ==
Joannes Cuppari was born in Split, Croatia on 9 September 1635. He was ordained a deacon on 8 August 1661 and ordained a priest on 10 August 1661. On 19 June 1684, he was appointed during the papacy of Pope Innocent XI as Bishop of Trogir. On 25 June 1684, he was consecrated bishop by Alessandro Crescenzi (cardinal), Cardinal-Priest of Santa Prisca, with Giuseppe Bologna, Archbishop Emeritus of Benevento, and Francesco Maria Giannotti, Bishop of Segni, serving as co-consecrators. He served as Bishop of Trogir until his death in 1694.

== External links and additional sources ==
- Cheney, David M. "Diocese of Trogir (Traù)". Catholic-Hierarchy.org. (for Chronology of Bishops)^{self-published}
- Chow, Gabriel. "Titular Episcopal See of Trogir". GCatholic.org. (for Chronology of Bishops)^{self-published}

Catholic Church titles
Preceded by Giovanni de Andreis	Bishop of Trogir; 1684–1694	Succeeded by Joseph Simeon Cavagnini
