= Giovanni Francesco Verdurae =

Most Reverend Giovanni Francesco Verdurae
- Bishop of Chiron
- Church: Catholic Church
- Diocese: Diocese of Chiron
- In office: 1549–1572
- Successor: Giulio Floretti

Personal details
- Died: 1572 Chersonissos, Crete

Giovanni Francesco Verdurae (died 1572) was a Roman Catholic prelate who served as Bishop of Chiron (1549–1572).

== Biography ==
On 7 Jun 1549, Giovanni Francesco Verdurae was appointed during the papacy of Pope Paul III as Bishop of Chiron. He served as Bishop of Chiron until his death in 1572.

Catholic Church titles
Preceded by	Bishop of Chiron; 1549–1572	Succeeded by Giulio Floretti
