= Eleonoro Pacello =

Roman Catholic prelate

Most Reverend Eleonoro Pacello
- Bishop of Pula
- Church: Catholic Church
- Diocese: Diocese of Pula
- In office: 1689–1695
- Predecessor: Bernardino Corniani
- Successor: Giuseppe Maria Bottari

Personal details
- Born: 9 January 1643 Vicence, Italy
- Died: May 1695 (age 52) Pula, Italy

Eleonoro Pacello (9 January 1643 – May 1695) was a Roman Catholic prelate who served as Bishop of Pula (1689–1695).

== Biography ==
Eleonoro Pacello was born in Vicence, Italy. On 16 Jun 1669, he was ordained as a priest and on 7 Nov 1689, he was appointed by Pope Alexander VIII as Bishop of Pula. He served as Bishop of Pula until his death in May 1695.

== See also ==
- Catholic Church in Italy

== External links and additional sources ==
- Cheney, David M. "Diocese of Pula (Pola)". Catholic-Hierarchy.org. (for Chronology of Bishops) ^{[self-published]}
- Chow, Gabriel. "Diocese of Pula (Pola) (Croatia)". GCatholic.org. (for Chronology of Bishops) ^{[self-published]}

Catholic Church titles
| Preceded by Bernardino Corniani | Bishop of Pula; 1689–1695 | Succeeded by Giuseppe Maria Bottari |
