= Bernardino Corniani =

Bishop of Pula, Croatia (1626–1689)

Most Reverend Bernardino Corniani
- Bishop of Pula
- Church: Catholic Church
- Diocese: Diocese of Pula
- In office: 1664–1689
- Predecessor: Ambrosio Fracassini
- Successor: Eleonoro Pacello

Personal details
- Born: 1626 Venice, Republic of Venice
- Died: 28 Jan 1689 (age 63) Pula, Republic of Venice

Bernardino Corniani (1626–1689) was an Italian Roman Catholic prelate who served as Bishop of Pula (1664–1689).

== Biography ==
Corniani was born in Venice, Republic of Venice. On 11 February 1664, he was appointed by Pope Alexander VII as Bishop of Pula. He served as Bishop of Pula until his death on 28 January 1689.

While bishop, he was the principal consecrator of Aleksandar Ignacije Mikulić Brokunovečki, Bishop of Knin (1688); and the principal co-consecrator of Nikola Spanic, Bishop of Korčula.

== External links and additional sources ==
- Cheney, David M. "Diocese of Pula (Pola)". Catholic-Hierarchy.org. (for Chronology of Bishops) ^{[self-published]}
- Chow, Gabriel. "Diocese of Pula (Pola) (Croatia)". GCatholic.org. (for Chronology of Bishops) ^{[self-published]}

Catholic Church titles
Preceded by Ambrosio Fracassini	Bishop of Pula; 1664–1689	Succeeded by Eleonoro Pacello
