= Diocese of Chiron =

Roman Catholic diocese

The Diocese of Chiron or Diocese of Chersonissos (Latin: Dioecesis Chersonesus) was a Roman Catholic diocese located in the town of Chersonissos in the north of Crete, bordering the Aegean Sea. In 1787, it was suppressed and became a Titular Episcopal See.

== History ==
- 1230?: Established as Diocese of Chiron (or Chersonissos)
- 1787: Suppressed as Titular Episcopal See of Chersonesus
- 1933: Renamed as Titular Episcopal See of Chersonesus in Creta

== Ordinaries ==
=== Diocese of Chiron ===
Name	Date appointed	Year died
Giacomo Ciera	1 Mar 1406	
...	...	...
Giovanni Francesco Verdurae	7 June 1549	1572
Giulio Floretti, O.F.M.	5 September 1572	1587
Giovanni Battista Bernini, O.F.M. Conv.	7 August 1587	1605
Domenico Mudazio	10 October 1605	1617
Giovanni Francesco Pozzo	2 October 1617	1619
Pietro Colletti	29 July 1619	1643
Giovanni de Rossi (bishop)	10 Jul 1645 (10 Nov 1653, appointed Bishop of Ossero)	

== See also ==
- Catholic Church in Greece
