= Biagio Molino =

Italian Catholic prelate (1380–1447)

Most Reverend Biagio Molino
- Titular Patriarch of Jerusalem
- Church: Catholic Church
- In office: 1434–1447
- Predecessor: Leonardo Delfino (patriarch)
- Successor: Cristoforo Garatoni
- Previous posts: Bishop of Pula (1410–1420); Archbishop of Zadar (1420–1427); Patriarch of Grado (1427–1434)

Personal details
- Born: 1380 Venice, Italy
- Died: 1447 (aged 66–67)

Biagio Molino or Biaggio Molina or Biageo de Molina (1380–1447) was a Roman Catholic prelate who served as Titular Patriarch of Jerusalem (1434–1447), Patriarch of Grado (1427–1434), Archbishop of Zadar (1420–1427), and Bishop of Pula (1410–1420).

== Biography ==
Biagio Molino was born in Venice, Italy in 1380. On 19 February 1410, he was appointed during the papacy of Pope Gregory XII as Bishop of Pula. On 4 March 1420, he was appointed during the papacy of Pope Martin V as Archbishop of Zadar. On 17 October 1427, he was appointed during the papacy of Pope Martin V as Patriarch of Grado. On 20 October 1434, he was appointed during the papacy of Pope Eugene IV as Titular Patriarch of Jerusalem. He served as Titular Patriarch of Jerusalem until his death in 1447. While bishop, he was the principal consecrator of Giacomo Veneri de Racaneto, Archbishop of Dubrovnik (1440).

== External links and additional sources ==
- Cheney, David M. "Diocese of Pula (Pola)". Catholic-Hierarchy.org. (for Chronology of Bishops) ^{[self-published]}
- Chow, Gabriel. "Diocese of Pula (Pola) (Croatia)". GCatholic.org. (for Chronology of Bishops) ^{[self-published]}
- Cheney, David M. "Archdiocese of Zadar (Zara)". Catholic-Hierarchy.org. (for Chronology of Bishops) ^{[self-published]}
- Chow, Gabriel. "Archdiocese of Zadar (Croatia)". GCatholic.org. (for Chronology of Bishops) ^{[self-published]}
- Cheney, David M. "Patriarchate of Grado". Catholic-Hierarchy.org. (for Chronology of Bishops) ^{[self-published]}
- Chow, Gabriel. "Patriarchate of Grado (Italy)". GCatholic.org. (for Chronology of Bishops) ^{[self-published]}
- Cheney, David M. "Patriarchate of Jerusalem {Gerusalemme}". Catholic-Hierarchy.org. (for Chronology of Bishops) ^{[self-published]}
- Chow, Gabriel. "Patriarchal See of Jerusalem". GCatholic.org. (for Chronology of Bishops) ^{[self-published]}

Catholic Church titles
Preceded by Bartolomeo	Bishop of Pula; 1410–1420	Succeeded by Tommaso Tommasini Paruta
Preceded by Luca Turriano da Fermo	Archbishop of Zadar; 1420–1427	Succeeded by Lorenzo Venier
Preceded by Leonardo Delfino (patriarch)	Patriarch of Grado; 1427–1434	Succeeded by Marco Condulmer
Preceded by Leonardo Delfino (patriarch)	Titular Patriarch of Jerusalem; 1434–1447	Succeeded by Cristoforo Garatoni
