= Paolo Naldini (bishop) =

Most Reverend Paolo Naldini
- Bishop of Capodistria
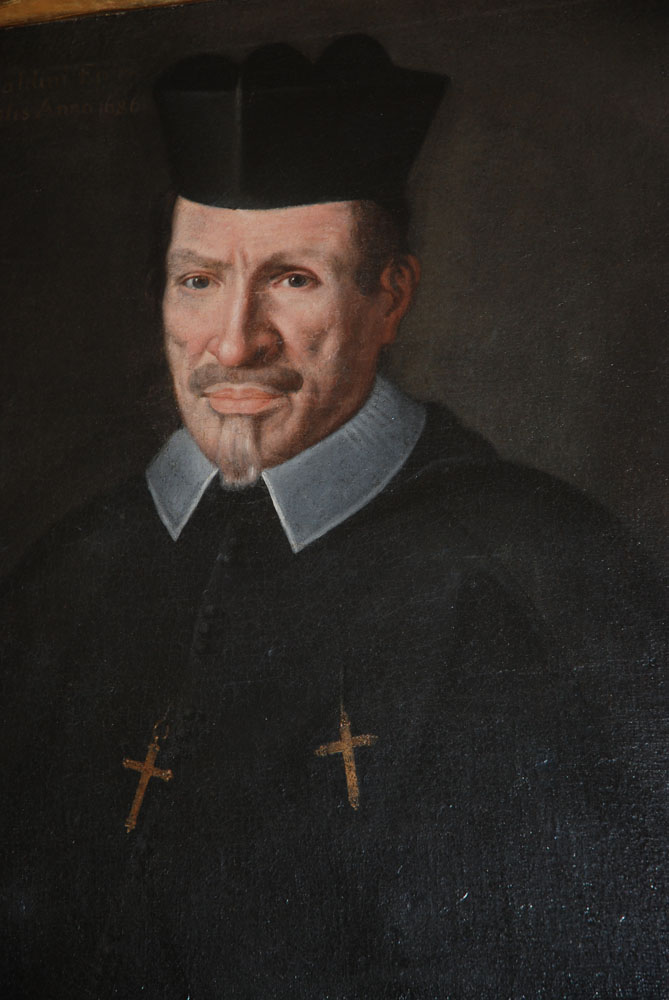
- Paolo Naldini
- Church: Catholic Church
- Diocese: Diocese of Capodistria
- In office: 1686–1713
- Predecessor: Pier Giulio Delfino
- Successor: Anton Maria Borromeo

Orders
- Ordination: 18 September 1655
- Consecration: 25 March 1686 by Alessandro Crescenzi (cardinal)

Personal details
- Born: 15 October 1632 Padua, Italy
- Died: 21 April 1713 (age 80) Capodistria, Slovenia

Paolo Naldini, O.E.S.A. (15 October 1632 – 21 April 1713) was a Roman Catholic prelate who served as Bishop of Capodistria (1686–1713).

== Biography ==
Paolo Naldini was born in Padua, Italy on 15 October 1632 and ordained a priest in the Order of Hermits of Saint Augustine on 18 September 1655. On 18 March 1686, he was appointed during the papacy of Pope Gregory XIII as Bishop of Capodistria. On 25 March 1686, he was consecrated bishop by Alessandro Crescenzi (cardinal), Cardinal-Priest of Santa Prisca, with Giuseppe Eusanio, Titular Bishop of Porphyreon, and Pier Antonio Capobianco, Bishop Emeritus of Lacedonia, serving as co-consecrators. He served as Bishop of Capodistria until his death on 21 April 1713.

Catholic Church titles
Preceded by Pier Giulio Delfino	Bishop of Capodistria; 1686–1713	Succeeded by Anton Maria Borromeo
