= Giuseppe Maria Bottari =

Roman Catholic prelate

Most Reverend Giuseppe Maria Bottari
- Bishop of Pula
- Church: Catholic Church
- Diocese: Diocese of Pula
- In office: 1695–1729
- Predecessor: Eleonoro Pacello
- Successor: Lelio Valentino Contessini-Ettorio

Orders
- Consecration: 10 Jul 1695 by Pier Matteo Petrucci

Personal details
- Born: 1646 Venice, Republic of Venice
- Died: Sep 1729 (age 83) Pula, Republic of Venice

Giuseppe Maria Bottari, O.F.M. Conv. (1646–1729) was an Italian Roman Catholic prelate who served as Bishop of Pula (1695–1729).

== Biography ==
Giuseppe Maria Bottari was born in Venice, Republic of Venice. In 1689, he was appointed Minister General of Order of Friars Minor Conventual. On 4 Jul 1695, he was appointed by Pope Innocent XII as Bishop of Pula. On 10 Jul 1695, he was consecrated bishop by Pier Matteo Petrucci, Cardinal-Priest of San Marcello with Francesco Gori, Bishop of Catanzaro, and Domenico Diez de Aux, Bishop of Gerace, as co-consecrators. He served as Bishop of Pula until his death in Sep 1729.

== See also ==
- Catholic Church in Croatia

== External links and additional sources ==
- Cheney, David M. "Diocese of Pula (Pola)". Catholic-Hierarchy.org. (for Chronology of Bishops) ^{[self-published]}
- Chow, Gabriel. "Diocese of Pula (Pola) (Croatia)". GCatholic.org. (for Chronology of Bishops) ^{[self-published]}

Catholic Church titles
Preceded by Eleonoro Pacello	Bishop of Pula; 1695–1729	Succeeded by Lelio Valentino Contessini-Ettorio
