= Roman Catholic Diocese of Capodistria =

The Diocese of Capodistria (also Diocese of Capo d'Istria or Diocese of Koper) (Latin: Dioecesis Iustinopolitanus) was a Roman Catholic diocese located in the town of Koper (Capodistria in Italian) in southwestern Slovenia. In 1828, it was united aeque principaliter with the Diocese of Trieste to form the Diocese of Trieste e Capodistria.

== Ordinaries ==
=== Diocese of Capodistria ===
Erected: 530 from the Diocese of Trieste
Latin Name: Iustinopolitanus

- Lodovico Morosini (1367 – 1390 Appointed, Bishop of Modon)
- Giacomo Loredan (1390 – 22 Apr 1411 Died)
- Cristoforo Zeno (16 Jun 1411 – 1420 Died)
- Girolamo de Pola (2 Dec 1420 – 1424 Died)
- Marino de' Bernardini, O.S.A. (14 Jul 1424 – 23 Feb 1428 Appointed, Bishop of Modon)
- Francesco Servandi, O.P. (23 Feb 1428 – 29 Mar 1448 Died)
- Gabriele Jacobi (20 May 1448 – 1471 Died)
- Pietro Bagnacavallo (16 Sep 1472 – 1473 Died)
- Šimun Vosić (Vossich) (26 Nov 1473 – Aug 1482 Died)
- Jacques Valaresso (30 Aug 1482 – 9 Mar 1503 Died)
- Bartolomeo da Sonica, O.P. (5 Apr 1503 – 13 Apr 1529 Died)
- Defendente Valvassori (Valaresso) (18 Apr 1529 – 1536 Died)
- Pietro Paolo Vergerio (6 Sep 1536 – 3 Jul 1549 Resigned)
- Tommaso Stella, O.P. (10 Nov 1549 – 6 Jan 1566 Died)
- Adriano Beretti (Valentico), O.P. (6 Mar 1566 – 7 Mar 1572 Died)
- Antonio Elio (30 Jul 1572 – 1576 Died)
- Giovanni Ingegneri (3 Dec 1576 – 13 Jan 1600)
- Girolamo Contarini, O.P. (15 May 1600 – 9 Oct 1619 Died)
- Girolamo Rusca, O.P. (29 Apr 1620 – 1632 Died)
- Pietro Morari (20 Sep 1632 – 1653 Died)
- Baldassarre Bonifazio (23 Nov 1653 – 1659 Died)
- Francesco Zeno (16 Feb 1660 – 14 Aug 1680 Died)
- Pier Giulio Delfino (19 Jun 1684 – 24 Apr 1685 Died)
- Paolo Naldini (bishop), O.E.S.A. (18 Mar 1686 – 21 Apr 1713 Died)
- Anton Maria Borromeo, C.R. (30 Aug 1713 – 7 Jul 1733 Resigned)
- Agostino Bruti (28 Sep 1733 – Oct 1747 Died)
- Giovanni Battista Sandi (18 Dec 1747 – 24 May 1756 Appointed, Bishop of Belluno)
- Carlo Camuzi (20 Sep 1756 – 1 Jun 1776 Resigned)
- Bonifacio da Ponte, O.S.B. (15 Jul 1776 – 6 Jan 1810 Died)

30 June 1828: United with the Diocese of Trieste to form the Diocese of Trieste e Capodistria Re-established as Diocese of Koper in 1977

== See also ==
- Catholic Church in Slovenia
