= John of Trogir =

Christian Bishop in the middle ages

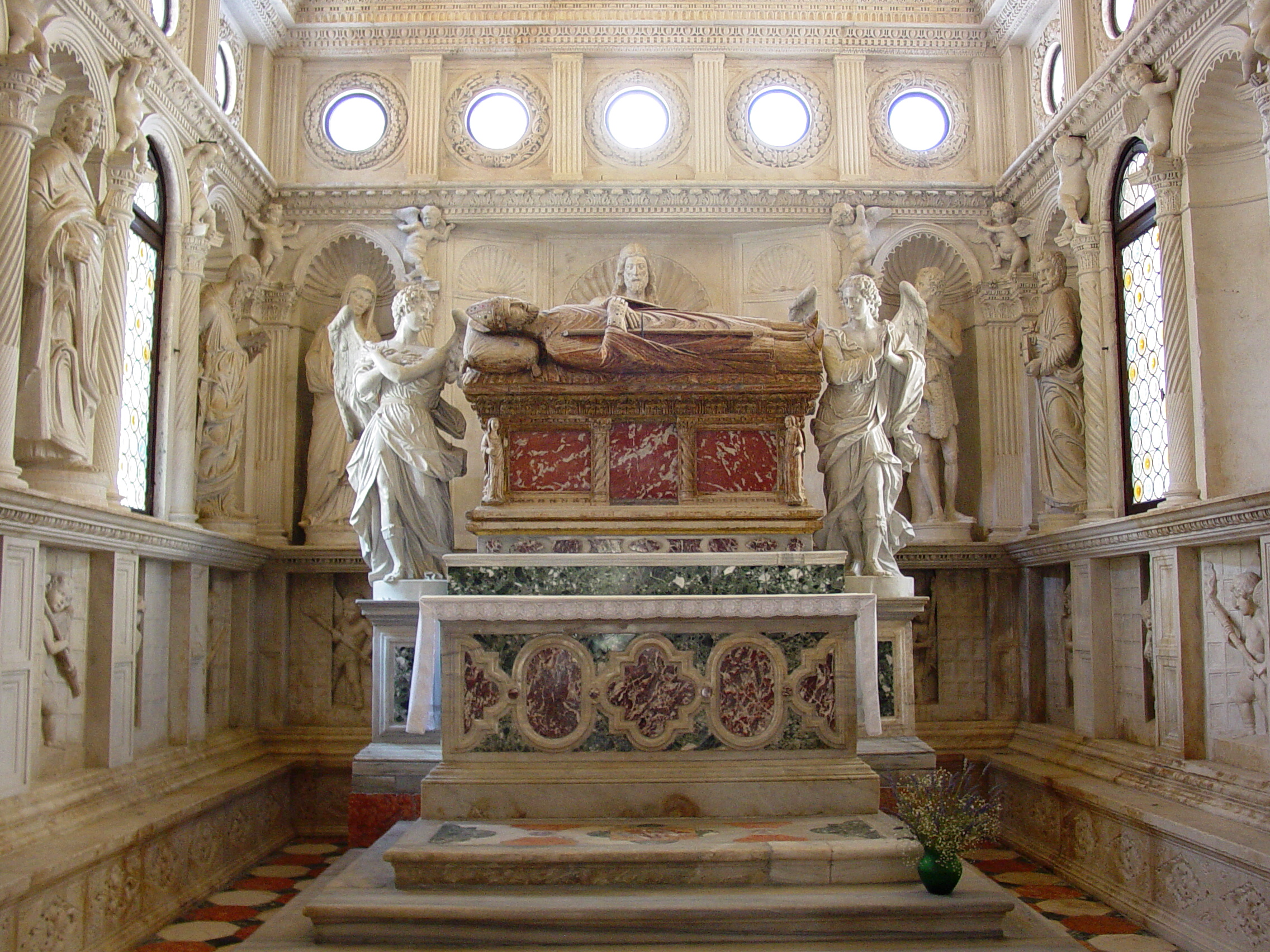
Tomb of John of Trogir in Trogir Cathedral

John of Trogir (died before 1111) was the bishop of Trogir, a Christian saint who lived in the 11th century.

He was originally a Benedictine monk in the monastery of Saint Peter in Osor, located on the island of Cres. John was eventually consecrated as the bishop of Trogir upon the citizen's request by Laurentinus, Archbishop of Split. His name appears variously in the charters of Croatian Kings towards the end of 11th century.

In 1105, he had diverted Coloman, King of Hungary from destroying Trogir, during his succession campaign for the crown.

His tomb is located in the Trogir Cathedral (Chapel of Saint Ivan Trogiranin). Feast of St. Ivan Trogir, patron of the city of Trogir, is solemnly celebrated on November 14.
