= Diocese of Asolo =

The Diocese of Asolo (Latin: Dioecesis Civitatis Novae Italian: Diocesi di Asolo) was a Roman Catholic diocese located in the town of Asolo in the Veneto Region of Northern Italy. In 969, it was suppressed and united with the Diocese of Treviso.

== Ordinaries ==
=== Diocese of Asolo ===
Erected: 6th century
Latin Name: Cardicensis
Metropolitan: Patriarchate of Grado

- Domenico Gaffaro (5 Nov 1348 Appointed – 1371 Died)
- Antonio Correr, O.P. (24 May 1406 – 15 Jul 1409 Appointed, Bishop of Ceneda)

Suppressed: 969

== See also ==
- Catholic Church in Italy
