= Nicolò Ormanetto =

Italian bishop

Nicolò Ormanetto (died 18 June 1577) was an Italian clergyman and bishop for the Roman Catholic Diocese of Padua. Ormanetto was born in Verona. He became ordained in 1570. He was appointed bishop in 1570. He died on 18 June 1577.
