= Roman Catholic Diocese of Novigrad =

Former Latin Catholic diocese in Croatia

The Diocese of Novigrad (alias Diocese of Cittanova in Italian) was a Latin Church ecclesiastical jurisdiction or diocese of the Catholic Church located in the city of Novigrad, Istria, Croatia until it was suppressed to the Diocese of Trieste in 1831.

== History ==
TO ELABORATE

- Established in 520 as the Diocese of Cittanova/ Novigrad, on reassigned territory from the suppressed Diocese of Emona (Emona is the present Ljubljana)
- Lost territory in 542 to establish the Diocese of Trieste (Italy)
- Gained territory back in 557 from above daughter Diocese of Trieste
- Lost territory in 811 to the Patriarchate of Aquileia (Italy)
- Held in personal union ('United aeque principaliter) with the (also Croatia]]) Diocese of Poreč 1442–1448
- united aeque principaliter with the Patriarchate of Grado (Italy) 1448–1451.10.08
- united aeque principaliter with the Patriarchate of Venice (Venezia, Italy; Grado's Patriarchal successor see) 1451.10.08–1465
- Gained territory back in 1784 from above Italian daughter Diocese of Trieste
- Suppressed on 30 June 1828, its territory being merged into the Diocese of Trieste via the papal bull, Locum Beati Petri, issued by Pope Leo XII on 30 June 1828; other sources state the official suppression came later on 23 May 1831

=== Residential Episcopal Ordinaries ===
Bishops of Cittanova/ Novigrad

- Leonardo (1212? – death 1224)
- Canziano (1228? – ?)
- Gerardo (1230.06.05 – 1237?)
- Bonaccorso (1243? – 1260?)
- Nicolò (1269? – ?)
- Egidio (1279? – 1283?)
- Simone (1284.05.15 – 1301?)
- Giraldo, Dominican Order (O.P.) (1308 – 1310?)
- Canziano (1318 – death 1330.04.04)
- Natale Bonafede (1330 – death 1344?)
- Giovanni Morosini, O.E.S.A. (1347.02.12 – death 1358?)
- Guglielmo Conti, O.P. (1359.03.15 – ?)
- Giovanni Grandi(s), Augustinian Order (O.E.S.A.) (21 April 1363 - death 1365)
- Marino Michiel (1366.01.14 – death 1374?)
- Nicolò Montaperto, Friars Minor (O.F.M.) (1376.05.14 – 1377.02.18), next Metropolitan Archbishop of Palermo (Sicily, Italy) (1377.02.18 – death 1382)
- Archbishop-bishop Ambrogio da Parma (1377.02.20 – 1380.10.10), previously Metropolitan Archbishop of Oristano (Italy) (1364 – 1377.02.20); later Archbishop-Bishop of Concordia (Italy) (1380.10.10 – 1389), Archbishop-Bishop of Tuscanella (1389 – 1391), Archbishop-Bishop of Viterbo (Italy) (1389 – death 1391)
- Paolo da Montefeltro, O.E.S.A. (1382.04 – 1400.08)
  - Apostolic Administrator Leonardo (1401.07.27 – ?), no other prelature recorded
- Tommaso Tommasini Paruta, O.P. (1409 – 1420.03.04), next Bishop of Pula (Croatia) (1420.03.04 – 1423.09.24), Bishop of Urbino (Italy) (1423.09.24 – 1424.12.11), Bishop of Traù (1424.12.11 – 1435.10.24), Bishop of Macerata (Italy) (1435.10.24 – 1440.10.15), Bishop of Recanati (Italy) (1435.10.24 – 1440.10.15), Bishop of Feltre (Italy) (1440.10.15 – death 1446.03.24)
- Giacomo de Montina, O.F.M. (1409.09.09 – ?)
  - Apostolic Administrator Cardinal Antonio Correr, C.R.S.A. (25 April 1420 - 20 Feb 1421), while Cardinal-Bishop of Suburbicarian Diocese of Porto e Santa Rufina (1409.05.09 – 1431.03.14), Chamberlain of the Holy Roman Church of Reverend Apostolic Camera (1412.07 – ?), Archpriest of Papal Basilica of St. Peter (1420 – 1434); later Cardinal Dean of Sacred College of Cardinals (1431? – 1445.01.19), transferred Cardinal-Bishop of Suburbicarian Diocese of Ostia–Velletri (1431.03.14 – death 1445.01.19), Apostolic Administrator of Diocese of Rimini (Italy) (1435.10.10 – 1435.11.21) and Apostolic Administrator of Diocese of Cervia (Italy) (1435.11 – 1440)
- Daniel Rampi Scoto (26 Feb 1421 - 7 Jan 1426), ?next Bishop of Poreč
- Filippo Paruta (1426.01.07 – 1426.04.02), next Bishop of Torcello (Italy) (1426.04.02 – 1448.02.20), Metropolitan Archbishop of Crete (insular Greece) (1448.02.20 – death 1458)
- Giovanni Morosini (1426.11.05 – 1442?), succeeding as previous Apostolic Administrator of Cittanova (1426.05.27 – 1426.11.05)
- Giovanni di Parenzo (1442 – retired 1448), died 1457; previously Bishop of Arba (Croatia) (1433.01.07 – 1440.04.11), Bishop of Poreč (Croatia) (1440.04.11 – 1457)

Patriarch of Grado and Suffragan Bishop of Cittanova/ Novigrad

- Domenico Michiel (1448 – 1451), only incumbent in personal union Patriarch of Grado (Italy) (1445.01.08 – 1451)

Patriarchs of Venice and Suffragan Bishops of Cittanova/ Novigrad

- Saint Lorenzo Giustiniani (1451.10.08 – 1456.01.08), first in personal union Patriarch of Venezia (Venice, Italy) (1451.10.08 – 1456.01.08); previously Bishop of Castello (1433.05.12 – 1451.10.08)
- Maffio Contarini (1456 – 1460)
- Andrea Bondimerio, Augustinian Order (O.E.S.A.) (1460 – 1464)
- Gregorio Correr (1464 – 1464)
- Giovanni Barozzi (1465.01.07 – death 1465); previously Bishop of Bergamo (Italy) (1449.10.31 – 1465.01.07)

Bishops of Cittanova/Novigrad

- Francesco Contarini (1466 – 1495)
- Marcantonio Foscarini (1495 – death 1521)
- Archbishop-bishop Antonio Marcello, Conventual Franciscans (O.F.M. Conv.) (1521.09.06 – 1526), previously Titular Archbishop of Patrasso (Patrae, peninsular Greece) (1520.05.21 – 1521.09.06)
  - Apostolic Administrator Cardinal Francesco Pisani (28 Sep 1526 - 10 May 1535), see below, while Cardinal-Deacon of S. Teodoro (1518.10.22 – 1527.05.03), Bishop of Padova (Padua, Italy) (1524.08.08 – 1555); next promoted Cardinal-Priest of S. Marco (1527.05.03 – 1555.05.29), Apostolic Administrator of Diocese of Treviso (Italy) (1528.01.27 – 1564), also Cardinal-Deacon of S. Maria in Portico in commendam (1528.02.27 – 1541.05.04) and Cardinal-Deacon of S. Agata alla Suburra in commendam (1529.05.24 – 1545.01.09) and Cardinal-Deacon of S. Maria in Portico in commendam (1550.02.28 – 1555.05.29), Apostolic Administrator of Archdiocese of Narbonne (France) (1551.05.11 – 1563.10.08), promoted Cardinal-Bishop of Suburbicarian Diocese of Albano (1555.05.29 – 1557.09.20), remaining Cardinal-Priest of S. Marco in commendam (1555.05.29 – 1564.06.21) see below
- Vincenzo de Benedictis (1535.05.10 – death 1536)
- Alessandro Orsi (1536.09.01 – 1559)
  - Apostolic Administrator Cardinal Francesco Pisani (again, see above 1559 – 1561.09.05 see below), while Cardinal-Bishop of Frascati (1557.09.20 – 1562.05.18)
- Matteo Priuli (bishop) (1561.09.05 – 1565.04.13)
  - Apostolic Administrator Cardinal Francesco Pisani (1559 – 1561.09.05), while Cardinal-Bishop of Suburbicarian Diocese of Ostia–Velletri (1564.05.12 – 1570.06.28) and Cardinal Dean of Sacred College of Cardinals (1564.05.12 – 1570.06.28); long earlier career
- Gerolamo Vielmi, Dominican Order (O.P.) (1570.07.19 – death 1582.03.07)
- Antonio Saraceno (1582.03.28 – death 1606.11.07)
- Franciscus Manini (4 July 1607 - death Sep 1619)
- Eusebius Caimus (10 Feb 1620 - death Oct 1640)
- Jacobus Philippus Tomasini (16 June 1642 - death June 1655)
- Giorgio Darmini (30 August 1655 - death Oct 1670), previously Bishop of Caorle (1653.11.24 – 1655.08.30)
- Giacomo Bruti (1 July 1671 - death Nov 1679)
- Nicolaus Gabrieli (19 June 1684 - 12 April 1717)
- Daniele Sansoni (14 June 1717 - death March 1725), previously Bishop of Caorle (1712.07 – 1717.07.14)
- Vittorio Mazzocca, O.P. (11 June 1725 - death 14 May 1732)
- Gaspar Negri (21 July 1732 - 22 Jan 1742), next Bishop of Diocese of Poreč (Croatia) (1742.01.22 – death 1778.01)
- Marino Bozzatini (9 July 1742 - death 9 July 1754)
- Stefano di Leoni (16 Sep 1754 - death May 1776)
- Giovanni Domenico Straticò, O.P. (15 July 1776 - 20 Sep 1784), next Bishop of Hvar (Croatia) (1784.09.20 – death 1799)
- Antonio Giovanni Giuseppe Lucovich (20 Sep 1784 - death 2 Dec 1794)
- Teodoro Lauretano Balbi (1 June 1795 - death 23 May 1831).

== Titular see ==
In 1969, the see was restored as a titular see:

- Titular Archbishop: Ugo Poletti (1969.07.03 – 1973.03.05) as Second Vicegerent for the Vicariate of Rome (Italy) (1969.07.03 – 1972.10.13) and as Pro-Vicar General for the Vicariate of Rome (1972.10.13 – 1973.03.26); previously Titular Bishop of Medeli (1958.07.12 – 1967.06.26) as Auxiliary Bishop of Diocese of Novara (Italy) (1958.07.12 – 1967.06.26), Archbishop of Spoleto (Italy) (1967.06.26 – 1969.07.03); later created Cardinal-Priest of Ss. Ambrogio e Carlo (1973.03.05 – death 1997.02.25), President of Commission for Advocates (1973.03.05 – 1997.02.25), Vicar General for the above Vicariate of Rome (Italy) (1973.03.26 – 1991.01.17), Apostolic Administrator of Suburbicarian Diocese of Ostia (Italy) (1973.03.26 – 1991.01.17), Archpriest of Papal Archbasilica of St. John Lateran (1973.03.26 – 1991.01.17), Grand Chancellor of Pontifical Lateran University (1973.03.26 – 1991.01.17), President of Liturgical Academy (1974? – 1990), President of Episcopal Conference of Italy (1985.07.03 – 1991.03), Archpriest of Papal Basilica of St. Mary Major (1991.01.17 – 1997.02.25)
- Titular Archbishop: Maximino Romero de Lema (1973.03.21 – 1996.10.29) as emeritate; previously Titular Bishop of Horta (1964.06.15 – 1968.10.19) as Auxiliary Bishop of Archdiocese of Madrid (Spain) (1964.06.15 – 1968.10.19), Bishop of Ávila (Spain) (1968.10.19 – 1973.03.21), Secretary of Commission of Cardinals for the Pontifical Shrines of Pompeii, Loreto and Bari (1973 – 1986), Secretary of Congregation for Clergy (1973.03.21 – 1986)
- Titular Archbishop: Leonardo Sandri (1997.07.22 – 2007.11.24), first as papal diplomat : Apostolic Nuncio (ambassador) to Venezuela (1997.07.22 – 2000.03.01), Apostolic Nuncio to Mexico (2000.03.01 – 2000.09.16), then as Substitute for General Affairs of Secretariat of State (2000.09.16 – 2007.06.09); previously Regent of Prefecture of the Papal Household (1991.08.22 – 1992.04.02), Assessor for General Affairs of Papal Secretariat of State (1992.04.02 – 1997.07.22); later Prefect of Congregation for the Oriental Churches (2007.06.09 – ...), Grand Chancellor of Pontifical Oriental Institute (2007.06.09 – ...), created Cardinal-Deacon of Ss. Biagio e Carlo ai Catinari (2007.11.24 [2007.12.02] – ...)
- Beniamino Pizziol (2008.01.05 – 2011.04.16) as Auxiliary Bishop of Patriarchate of Venezia (Venice, Italy) (2008.01.05 – 2011.04.16); later Bishop of Vicenza (Italy) (2011.04.16 – ...), Apostolic Administrator of Patriarchate of Venice (Venezia, Italy) (2011.09.08 – 2012.01.31)
- Lorenzo Leuzzi (Italian) (2012.01.31 – ...), Auxiliary Bishop of the papal Vicariate of Rome (Italy) (2012.01.31 – ...).

== See also ==
- List of Catholic dioceses in Croatia

== Sources and external links ==
- GCatholic - data for all sections
