= Latin Bishopric of Modon =

Diocese in Greece

The Diocese of Modon or Medone (Latin: Dioecesis Mothonensis) was a "Latin" (Roman Catholic) diocese located in the town of Modon in Messenia in the Peloponnese region of Greece. It was established in place of the pre-existing Greek Orthodox see in the aftermath of the Fourth Crusade, with the creation of the Principality of Achaea and the establishment of Venetian rule over Modon in 1209.

Following its fall to the Ottoman Empire, in 1506 it was suppressed and became a titular see.

== History ==
- ca. 1205: Established as Diocese of Modone
- 1506: Suppressed as Titular Episcopal See of Modon
- 1925: Renamed as Titular Episcopal See of Methone

== Ordinaries ==
=== Diocese of Modon ===
ca. 1205: Erected. Metropolitan: Old Patras

- Leonardo Patrasso (1295 - 17 Jun 1297 Appointed, Bishop of Aversa)
- Lodovico Morosini (1390 - 1407)
- Antonio Correr, C.R.S.A. (24 Feb 1407 - 31 Mar 1407 Appointed, Bishop of Bologna)

...

- Marino de' Bernardini, O.S.A. (23 Feb 1428 - 25 Sep 1430 Appointed, Archbishop of Corfù)
- Gabriele Jacobi (15 Dec 1432 - 20 May 1448 Appointed, Bishop of Capodistria)
- Angelo Fasolo (7 Nov 1459 - 16 Sep 1464 Appointed, Bishop of Feltre)
- Johann Ostwein (12 Mar 1472 - 1491 Died)

1506: Suppressed
