= Roman Catholic Diocese of Pula =

Diocese in Croatia

The Diocese of Pula (Italian: Diocese of Pola) was a Roman Catholic diocese in Croatia, located in the city of Pula. In 1828, it was suppressed and united with the Diocese of Poreč to form the Archdiocese of Diocese of Poreč-Pula.

== History ==
- 600: Established as Diocese of Pula (Dioecesis Polensis)
- October 16, 1787: Lost territory to Diocese of Senj–Modruš
- 1794: Lost territory to Diocese of Trieste
- June 30, 1828: Suppressed and united with the Diocese of Poreč to form the Archdiocese of Diocese of Poreč-Pula via the papal bull, Locum Beati Petri, issued by Pope Leo XII on 30 June 1828.

== Ordinaries ==
=== Diocese of Pula ===
- Odon de Sala, O.P. (7 Feb 1302 - 30 Mar 1308 Appointed, Archbishop of Oristano)

...

- Biaggio Molino (19 Feb 1410 - 4 Mar 1420 Appointed, Archbishop of Zadar)

...

- Michele Orsini (8 Mar 1475 - 1493 Died)
- Altobello de Averoldi (13 Nov 1497 - 1 Nov 1531 Died)
- Giovanni Battista Vergerio (15 Jan 1532 - 1548 Died)
- Antonio Elio (17 Aug 1548 - 1566 Resigned)
- Matteo Barbabianca (28 Apr 1567 - 1582 Died)
- Claudius Sozomenus (7 Feb 1583 - 1605 Resigned)
- Kornelios Sozomenus (31 Aug 1605 - 1617 Died)
- Uberto Testa (26 Mar 1618 - Aug 1623 Died)
- Innocentius Serpa, C.R.L. (12 Feb 1624 - 1625 Died)
- Rodolfo Rodolfi-Sforza (3 Mar 1625 - 1626 Died)
- Giulio Saraceni (1 Mar 1627 - Aug 1640 Died)
- Marino Badoer, O.S.B. (1 Jul 1641 - 1648 Died)
- Alvise Marcello, C.R.S. (15 Dec 1653 - 16 Jul 1661 Died)
- Gaspare Cattaneo (31 Jul 1662 - Nov 1662 Died)
- Ambrosio Fracassini, O.P. (12 Mar 1663 - 22 Sep 1663 Died)
- Bernardino Corniani (11 Feb 1664 - 28 Jan 1689 Died)
- Eleonoro Pacello (7 Nov 1689 - May 1695 Died)
- Giuseppe Maria Bottari, O.F.M. Conv. (4 Jul 1695 - Sep 1729 Died)
- Lelio Valentino Contessini-Ettorio (28 Nov 1729 - Mar 1732 Died)
- Giovanni Andrea Balbi (21 Jul 1732 - Oct 1771 Died)
- Francesco Polesini (22 Jun 1772 - 1 Jun 1778 Appointed, Bishop of Poreč)
- Ivan Dominik Juras (20 Jul 1778 - 19 Sep 1802 Died)

== See also ==
- Catholic Church in Croatia
