= Roman Catholic Diocese of Tragurium =

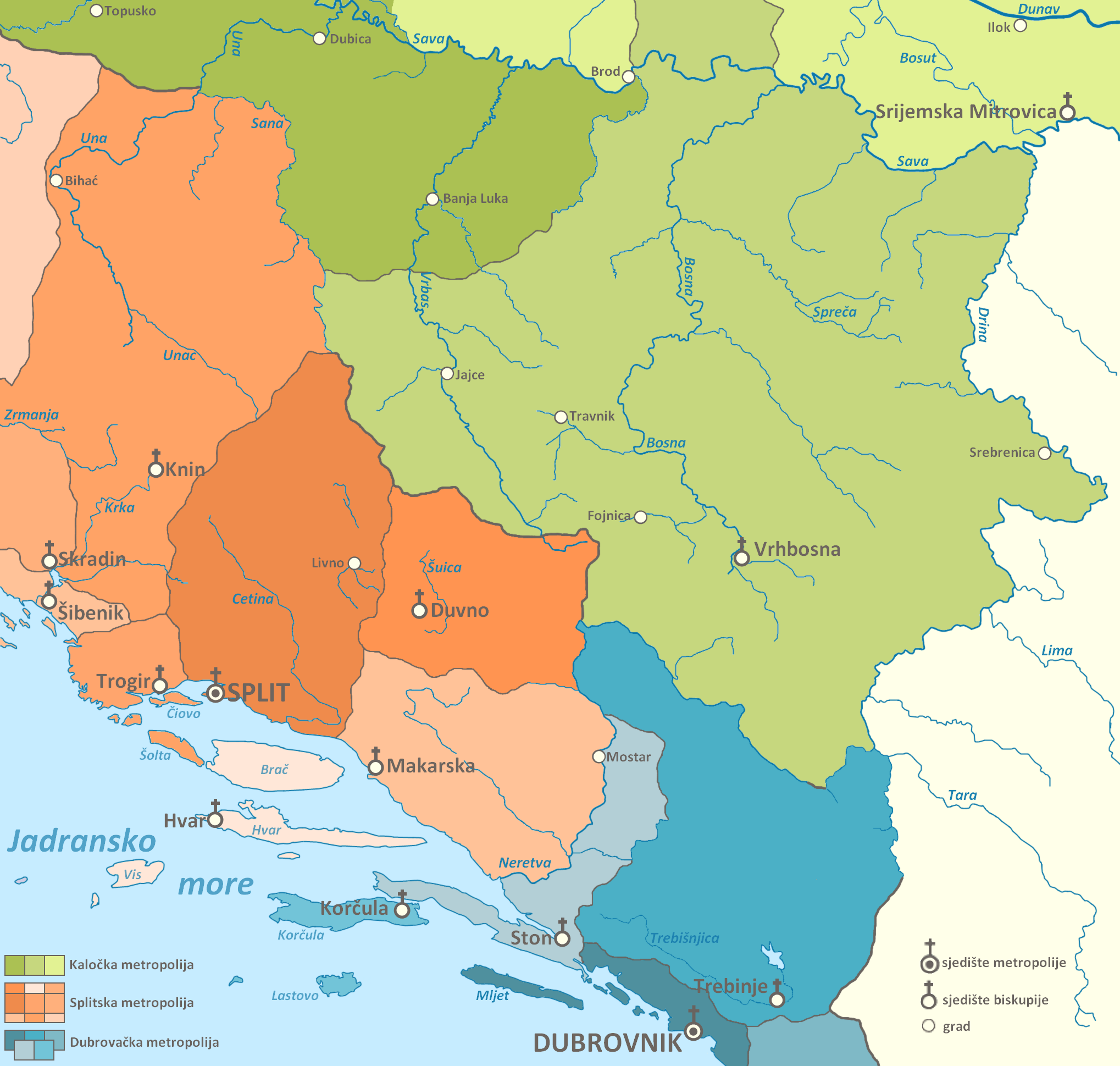

Tragurium, Ancient Latin name of a city in Dalmatia (coastal Croatia), now called Trogir, was a bishopric until 1829 and a Latin titular bishopric until 1933.

== History ==
In 1050 Tragurium became the seat of a diocese also known as Traù (in curiate Italian) or Trogir in Croatian.

On 1 May 1298 it lost territory to establish the Diocese of Šibenik.

On 30 June 1828, the residential see was abolished by papal bull Locum Beati Petri, a Croatian dioceses reshuffle, which divided its territory over the then Roman Catholic Diocese of Split–Makarska and its own above daughter Šibenik.

=== Residential suffragan bishops ===
- Petrus (970-?)
- Saint John of Trogir, actually Giovanny, from Osor (1062 - death 14.11.1111)
- Anonim (1112 -?)
- sede vacante (1123-1151?)
- Dessa Maccarelli, from Tragurium (1151-1180, elected only)
- Michael, from Tragurium (1180-1206), previously Coadjutor Bishop of Traù (? – 1180?)
- Treguanus alias Treguano, from Florence (1206 - death 1254)
- Columbanus alias fra Columbano, from Rab, Friars Minor (O.F.M.) (1255-1277)
- Joannes II (1277-?)
- Gregorius Machinatura, from Tragurium (1282 - death 1297)
- Liberio, from Ancona (Italy, 1297 - death 1319)
- Lampridio Vitturi, from Tragurium (1320 - death 1348)
- fra Bartolomeo, from Vallismontana (1349 - death 1361?), previously Bishop of Kotor (Montenegro) (1348.07.14 – 1349.01.30)
- Niccolò de' Casotti (Nikola Kažotić), from Tragurium (1361 - death 1370)
- Valentinus (1370-?)
- Crisogono (Krševan) de Dominis (14 July 1372 - 1403), from and previously Bishop of the Roman Catholic Diocese of Arba (Rab) (1363.06.07 – 1372.07.14); later Metropolitan Archbishop of Kalocsa (Hungary, plausibly not possessed as he died the same year)
- Simone (Šimun) de Dominis, from Rab (1403 - death 1420?)
- Marino de Cernotis (Carnota), from Rab (1423 - 1424), previously Bishop of Arba (1414.02.11 – 1423.05.07); later bishop of Trieste (Italy, 1424.12.11 – death 1441)
- fra Tommaso Tomasini from Tuscia, Dominicans (O.P.) (1424 - 1435), previously Bishop of Cittanova (d'Istria) (Croatia, 1409 – 1420.03.04), Bishop of Pula (Croatia) (1420.03.04 – 1423.09.24), Bishop of Roman Catholic Diocese of Urbino (Italy) (1423.09.24 – 1424.12.11); later bishop of Recanati (Italy, 1435.10.24 – 1440.10.15), then Bishop of Feltre (Italy) (1440.10.15 – 1446.03.24)
- Ludovico (Trevisan) Scarampi Mezzarota, from Padua (Italy, 1435 - 1437), later Metropolitan Archbishop of Firenze (Florence) (Italy) (1437.08.06 – 1439.12.18), Patriarch of Aquileia (Italy) (1439.12.18 – 1465.03.22), created Cardinal-Priest of San Lorenzo in Damaso (1440.07.01 – 1465.01.07), Chamberlain of the Holy Roman Church of Reverend Apostolic Camera (1440 – death 1465.03.22)
- Giovanni Vitelleschi, Apostolic administrator or Bishop, according to the source, 1437 - 1440); previously Bishop of Macerata (Italy) (1431.04.16 – 1435.10.12), Titular Patriarch of Alexandria (1435.02.21 – death 1440.04.02), Metropolitan Archbishop of Firenze (Florence) (Italy) (1435.10.12 – 1437.08.09); also Cardinal-Priest of San Lorenzo in Lucina (1437.08.09 – 1440.04.02), Archpriest of the Roman Papal Basilica of St. Mary Major (1439 – 1440.04.02)
- Angelo Cavazza from Venice (1440 - death 1452), previously Bishop of Arba (1428.02.23 – 1433.01.07), Bishop of Poreč–Novigrad (Croatia) (1433.01.07 – 1440.04.11)
- Giacomo Trugloni, from Ancona (Italy, 1452 - death 1483)
- Leonello Chiericato, from Vicenza (Italy, 1484 - 1488), previously Bishop of Arba (1472.01.08 – 1484.01.19); later bishop of Concordia (1488.10.22 – death 1506.08.19)
- Francesco Marcelli, from Venice (1488 - death 1524)
- Toma Niger (Tommaso de Nigris) from Split (1524-1525), alias Tommaso de Nigris, previously Bishop of Skradin (1520.01.11 – 1524.09.02) ***
- Cristoforo de Baptistis (Niger) alias Cristoforo de Nigris, from Split (Croatia, 1525.06.07 - death 1559.11.25)
- Federico Cornaro from Venice (1560-1561), later Bishop of Bergamo (Italy) (1561.01.15 – 1577.07.19), Bishop of Padua (Italy) (1577.07.19 – 1590.10.04), created Cardinal-Priest of San Stefano al Monte Celio (1586.01.15 – 1590.10.04)
  - apostolic administrator (1561-1567) Alvise cardinal Corner from Venice ***
- Tommaso Sperandio Corbelli, from Fano (Italy, 1567 - 1574)
- Antonio Guidi, from Mantua (Italy, 1574 - 1604)
- Martius Andreucci, from Udine (Italy, 1604 - 1622)
- Pace Giordano (Pax Jordanus) (1623-1649) from Vicenza (1623-1649)
  - sede vacante (1649-1654)
- Francesco Coccalini, from Venice (1654 - 1661)
- Giovanni Paolo Garzoni, from Venice (1663 - 1675)
- Giovanni de Andreis, from Trogir (1676 - 1683)
- Joannes Cuppari (Ivan Cupareo), from Split (1684 - 1694)
- Joseph Simeon Cavagnini, from Split (1695 - 1698)
- Stefano Cupilli, from Venice (1699 - 1708 transferred to the see of Split)
- Pietro Paolo Calorio (Calore), from Venice (1708 - 1713 transferred to the see of Krk, Croatia)
- fra Michael Angelus Farfulfi (Michelangelo Farolfi), from Candia (Heraklion) (Crte, Greece, 1713 - 1715)
- Ivan Vidović (Jean Vidovich) from Šibenik (1716 - 1721)
- Ante Kadčić (Antoine Kacich) from Makarska (1722 – 1730 transferred to the see of Split)
- fra Giuseppe Caccia, from Venice (1731 - 1737)
- Gerolamo Fonda from Piran (1738 - 1754)
- Didak Manola (Diego Manola), from Split (1755 - 1765)
- Ivan Antun Miočević (Johann Anton Miocevich), from Šibenik (Croatia, 1766 - 1786)
- Lelio Cippico, from Trogir (accepted 1783 the transfer from the see of Šibenik when Miočević was to be transferred to the see of Split – 1784 transferred to the see of Split)
- Antun Belglava (Antonio Belglava), from Zadar (Croatia, 1787 - 1790)
- Giovanni Pietro Galzigna, from Rab (1790 - 1795 transferred to the see of Rab)
- Giovanni Antonio Pinelli, from Trogir (1795 - 1821)
  - sede vacante (1821-1828)

== Titular see ==
Since 1933 the bishopric was nominally restored and is on the Catholic Church's list of titular sees.

It has had the following incumbents, all of the lowest (episcopal) rank :

- Frans Joseph Bruls Canisius, Montfort Missionaries (S.M.M.) (26 April 1969 - 7 January 1976) as emeritate; previously Titular Bishop of Parætonium (1939.01.07 – 1964.02.11) & Coadjutor Apostolic Vicar of Los Llanos de San Martín (Colombia) (1939.01.07 – 1939.06.27) succeeding as Vicar Apostolic of Los Llanos de San Martín (1939.06.27 – 1949.06.09), last Apostolic Vicar of Villavicencio (Colombia) (1949.06.09 – 1964.02.11), promoted first Bishop of Villavicencio (1964.02.11 – 1969.04.26)
- Thaddeus Anthony Shubsda (20 December 1976 - 26 May 1982 named Bishop of Monterey)
- Dale Joseph Melczek (3 December 1982 - 28 October 1995 named Coadjutor Bishop of Gary)
- Pierre Farine (12 August 1996 - ), Auxiliary Bishop emeritus of Lausanne, Geneva and Fribourg (Switzerland)

== See also ==
- Catholic Church in Croatia
