= Alessandro Crescenzi (cardinal) =

Italian Roman Catholic cardinal

- Cardinal Priest of Santa Prisca
- Church: Catholic Church
- In office: 1675–1688
- Predecessor: Carlo Pio di Savoia
- Successor: Marcello Durazzo
- Previous posts: Bishop of Termoli (1643–1644); Bishop of Ortona a Mare e Campli (1644–1652); Bishop of Bitonto (1652–1668); Titular Patriarch of Alexandria (1671–1676); Archbishop (Personal Title) of Recanati e Loreto (1676–1682); Camerlengo of the Sacred College of Cardinals (1685–1688)

Orders
- Consecration: 26 July 1643 by Alessandro Cesarini (iuniore)
- Created cardinal: 27 May 1675
- Rank: Cardinal Priest

Personal details
- Born: Alessandro Agostino Crescenzi; 1607 Rome, Papal States
- Died: 8 May 1688 (aged 80–81) Rome, Papal States

Alessandro Agostino Crescenzi, C.R.S. (1607 – 8 May 1688) was a Roman Catholic cardinal who served as Camerlengo of the Sacred College of Cardinals (1685–1688), Archbishop (Personal Title) of Recanati e Loreto (1676–1682), Titular Patriarch of Alexandria (1671–1676), Bishop of Bitonto (1652–1668), Bishop of Ortona a Mare e Campli (1644–1652), and Bishop of Termoli (1643–1644).

== Biography ==
Alessandro Agostino Crescenzi was born in Rome in 1607, the son of Giovanni Battista Crescenzi and Anna Massimi. He is related to Cardinal Marcello Crescenzi (named 1542) and is the nephew of Cardinal Pier Paolo Crescenzi (named 1611). He was ordained a priest in the Ordo Clericorum Regularium a Somascha.

On 13 July 1643, he was appointed Bishop of Termoli by Pope Urban VIII. In Rome, on 26 July 1643, he was consecrated bishop by Alessandro Cesarini (iuniore), Cardinal-Deacon of Sant'Eustachio.

On 13 June 1644, he was appointed Bishop of Ortona a Mare e Campli by Pope Urban VIII.

On 26 August 1652, he was appointed Bishop of Bitonto by Pope Innocent X. Pope Innocent X appointed him Apostolic Nuncio to Savoy (Turin), where he served until 1658.

On 14 May 1668, he resigned as Bishop of Bitonto. On 23 December 1670, he was named Prefect of the Cubiculi of His Holiness (Maestro di Camera) by Pope Clement X. On 19 January 1671, he was promoted by Pope Clement X to the titular post of Titular Patriarch of Alexandria. On 27 May 1675, he was installed as Cardinal Priest of Santa Prisca in the consistory of 1675.

On 24 February 1676, he was appointed Bishop of Recanati e Loreto by Pope Clement X, where he served until his resignation on 9 January 1682. As cardinal, he participated in the conclave of 1676 which elected Pope Innocent XI. On 9 April 1685, he was named camerlengo of the Sacred College of Cardinals.

He died in Rome on 8 May 1688, and was buried in the church of Santa Maria in Vallicella.

== Episcopal succession ==
Episcopal succession of Alessandro Crescenzi

While bishop, he was the principal consecrator of:

- Andrea Bonito, Bishop of Capaccio (1677);
- Vitus Piluzzi, Titular Archbishop of Marcianopolis (1678);
- Stephanus Cosimi, Archbishop of Split (1678);
- Bernardino Belluzzi, Bishop of Montefeltro (1678);
- Francesco Scannagatta, Bishop of Avellino e Frigento (1679);
- Carlo Berlingeri, Archbishop of Santa Severina (1679);
- Francesco Megale, Bishop of Isola (1679);
- Giacomo Villani, Bishop of Caiazzo (1679);
- Giovanni Battista Nepita, Bishop of Sant'Angelo dei Lombardi e Bisaccia (1680);
- Tommaso Guzzoni, Bishop of Sora (1681);
- Andrea Brancaccio, Bishop of Conversano (1681);
- Sebastien Knab, Archbishop of Nakhchivan (1682);
- Giovanni Battista Giberti, Bishop of Cava de' Tirreni (1683);
- Giuseppe Felice Barlacci, Bishop of Narni (1683);
- Bernardin Marchese, Bishop of Sarsina (1683);
- Stefano Ghirardelli, Bishop of Alatri (1683);
- Agostino Fieschi, Bishop of Accia and Mariana (1683);
- Giambattista Quaranta, Bishop of Larino (1683);
- Francesco Antonio Leopardi, Bishop of Marsico Nuovo (1683);
- Domenico Menna, Bishop of Minori (1683);
- Vincenzo Maria Durazzo, Bishop of Savona (1683);
- Ferdinando de Rojas (Roxas), Bishop of Vigevano (1683);
- Francesco Maria Moles, Bishop of Nola (1684);
- Annibale de Pietropaulo, Bishop of Castellammare di Stabia (1684);
- Horatius Ondedei, Bishop of Urbania e Sant'Angelo in Vado (1684);
- Giovanni Battista de Belli, Bishop of Telese o Cerreto Sannita (1684);
- Fulvio Crivelli (Cribelli), Bishop of Tricarico (1684);
- Antonio Polcenigo, Bishop of Feltre (1684);
- Domenico Minio, Bishop of Caorle (1684);
- Giambattista Rubini, Bishop of Vicenza (1684);
- Giovanni Battista De Pace, Bishop of Capaccio (1684);
- Giovanni Battista Sanudo, Bishop of Treviso (1684);
- Pier Giulio Delfino, Bishop of Capodistria (1684);
- Nicolaus Gabrieli, Bishop of Novigrad (1684);
- Joannes Cuppari, Bishop of Trogir (1684);
- Stefano David, Bishop of Krk (1684);
- Giambattista Morea, Bishop of Lacedonia (1684);
- Pietro Luigi Malaspina, Bishop of Cortona (1684);
- Giovanni Riccanale, Bishop of Boiano (1684);
- Girolamo Compagnone, Archbishop of Rossano (1685);
- Angelo Cerasi, Bishop of Bovino (1685);
- Giovanni Battista Antici, Bishop of Amelia (1685);
- Pietro Valentini, Bishop of Sovana (1685);
- Emiddio Lenti, Bishop of Nocera de' Pagani (1685);
- Domenico Valvassori, Bishop of Gravina di Puglia (1686);
- François Genet, Bishop of Vaison (1686);
- Paolo Naldini (bishop), Bishop of Capodistria (1686);
- Muzio Dandini, Bishop of Senigallia (1686);
- Filippo Tani, Bishop of Città Ducale (1686);
- Giulio Giacomo Castellani, Bishop of Cagli (1686);
- Baldassare de Benavente, Bishop of Potenza (1686);
- Filippo Massarenghi, Bishop of Bitonto (1686);

and the principal co-consecrator of:

- Camillo Astalli-Pamphilj, Bishop of Catania (1661);
- Antonio Bottis, Bishop of Minori (1670);
- Giuseppe Labonia, Bishop of Montemarano (1670);
- Mario Alberizzi, Titular Archbishop of Neocaesarea in Ponto (1671);
- Pompeo Varese, Titular Archbishop of Hadrianopolis in Haemimonto (1671);
- Domenico Massimo, Bishop of Corneto (Tarquinia) e Montefiascone (1671);
- Fabrizio Spada, Titular Archbishop of Patrae (1672);
- Friedrich von Hessen-Darmstadt, Bishop of Wrocław (1673);
- Simon Gaudenti, Bishop of Ossero (1673);
- Andrea Francolisio d'Aquino, Bishop of Tricarico (1673); and
- Giuseppe di Giacomo, Bishop of Bovino (1673).

== Sources ==
- Cardella, Lorenzo. Memorie storiche de' cardinali della Santa Romana Chiesa, (in Italian), Vol. 7 (Roma: Pagliarini 1793), pp. 231–233.

Catholic Church titles
Preceded by Gerolamo Cappello	Bishop of Termoli; 1643–1644	Succeeded by Cherubino Manzoni
Preceded by Francesco Antonio Biondo	Bishop of Ortona a Mare e Campli; 1644–1652	Succeeded by Carlo Bonafaccia
Preceded by Giovanni Battista Landi	Apostolic Nuncio to Savoy; 1646–1658	Succeeded by Carlo Roberti de' Vittori
Preceded by Fabrizio Carafa (bishop)	Bishop of Bitonto; 1652–1668	Succeeded by Tommaso Acquaviva d'Aragona
Preceded by Federico Borromeo (iuniore)	Titular Patriarch of Alexandria; 1671–1676	Succeeded by Aloysius Bevilacqua
Preceded by Giacinto Cordella	Archbishop (Personal Title) of Recanati e Loreto; 1676–1682	Succeeded by Guarnerio Guarnieri
Preceded by Girolamo Gastaldi	Camerlengo of the Sacred College of Cardinals; 1685–1688	Succeeded by Galeazzo Marescotti
Preceded by Carlo Pio di Savoia	Cardinal Priest of Santa Prisca; 1675–1688	Succeeded by Marcello Durazzo
