= Egidio Colonna (patriarch) =

Most Reverend Egidio Colonna
- Titular Patriarch of Jerusalem
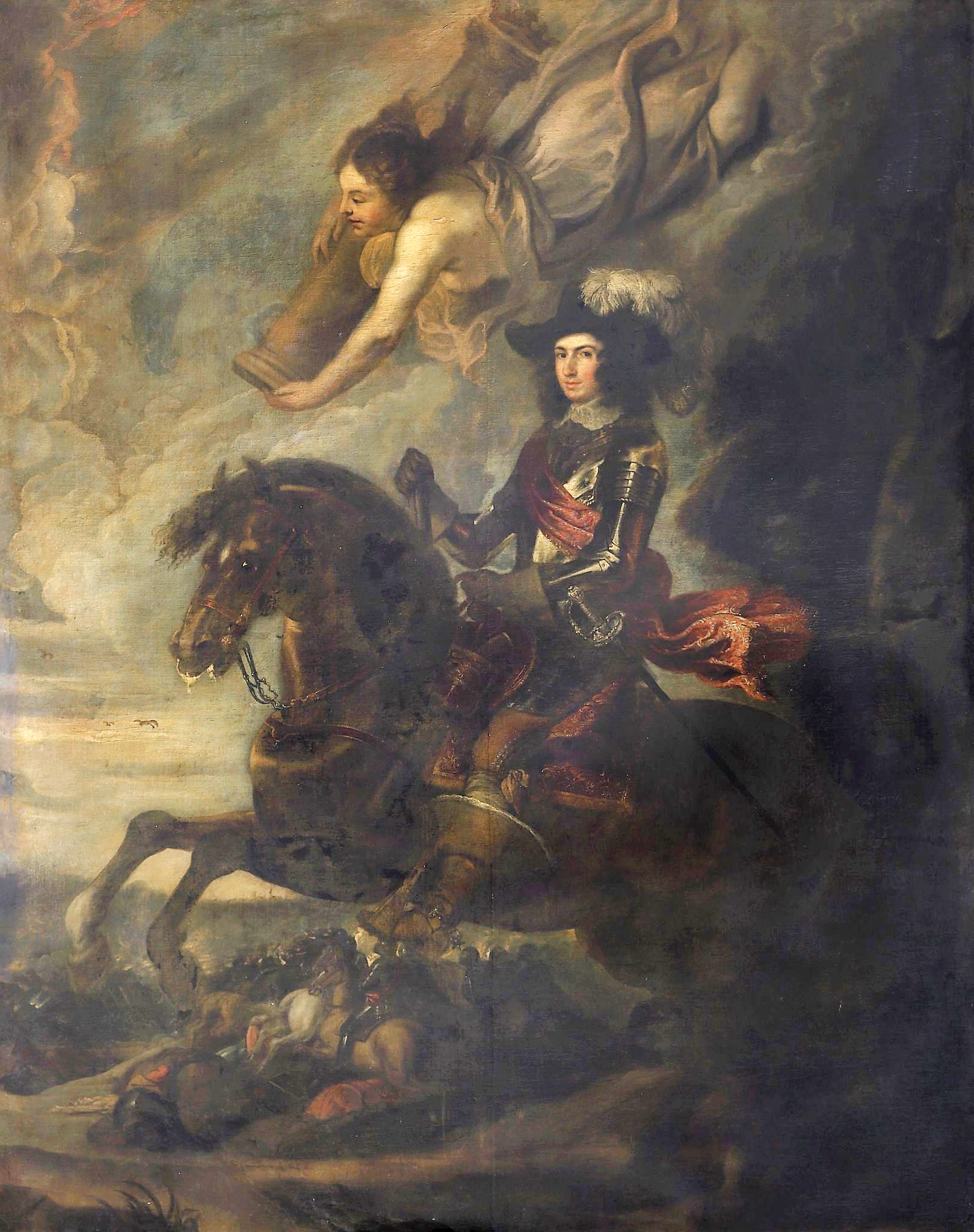
- Church: Catholic Church
- In office: 1671–1686
- Predecessor: Camillo Massimi
- Successor: Bandino Panciatici
- Previous post: Titular Archbishop of Amasea (1643–1671)

Orders
- Ordination: 4 December 1638

Personal details
- Born: 1607
- Died: 11 October 1686 (age 79)
- Coat of arms

Egidio Colonna, O.S.B., born Carlo Colonna (1607 – 11 October 1686) was a Roman Catholic prelate who served as Titular Patriarch of Jerusalem (1671–1686) and Titular Archbishop of Amasea (1643–1671).

== Biography ==
Egidio Colonna was born in 1607 and ordained a priest in the Order of Saint Benedict on 4 December 1638. On 19 December 1643, he was appointed during the papacy of Pope Urban VIII as Titular Archbishop of Amasea. On 19 January 1671, he was appointed during the papacy of Pope Clement X as Titular Patriarch of Jerusalem. He served as Titular Patriarch of Jerusalem until his death on 11 October 1686.

== Episcopal succession ==
While bishop, he was the principal co-consecrator of:
- Francisco de Rojas-Borja y Artés, Archbishop of Tarragona (1653);
- Francisco Antonio Díaz de Cabrera, Bishop of Salamanca (1660);
- Ambrosio Ignacio Spínola y Guzmán, Bishop of Oviedo (1665);
- Diego de Silva y Pacheco, Bishop of Guadix (1668);
- Baltasar de los Reyes, Bishop of Orense (1668);
- Miguel de Cárdenas, Bishop of Ciudad Rodrigo (1668);
- Francisco de Rois y Mendoza, Bishop of Badajoz (1668);
- Domenico Massimo, Bishop of Corneto e Montefiascone (1671);
- Johann Eberhard Nidhard (Neidhardt), Titular Archbishop of Edessa in Osrhoëne (1672);
- Friedrich von Hessen-Darmstadt, Bishop of Wrocław (1673);
- Giovanni Gambacorta, Bishop of Marsico Nuovo (1676);
- Ercole Visconti, Titular Archbishop of Tamiathis (1678); and
- Federico Visconti, Archbishop of Milan (1681);

== External links and additional sources ==
- Cheney, David M. "Amasea (Titular See)". 'Catholic-Hierarchy.org. (for Chronology of Bishops)
- Chow, Gabriel. "Titular Metropolitan See of Amasea (Turkey)". GCatholic.org. (for Chronology of Bishops)
- Cheney, David M. "Patriarchate of Jerusalem {Gerusalemme}". Catholic-Hierarchy.org. (for Chronology of Bishops) ^{[self-published]}
- Chow, Gabriel. "Patriarchal See of Jerusalem (Israel)". GCatholic.org. (for Chronology of Bishops) ^{[self-published]}

Catholic Church titles
Preceded by Faustus Poli	Titular Archbishop of Amasea; 1643–1671	Succeeded by Francesco de' Marini
Preceded by Camillo Massimi	Titular Patriarch of Jerusalem; 1671–1686	Succeeded by Bandino Panciatici
