= Giuseppe di Giacomo =

Italian Roman Catholic prelate

Most Reverend Giuseppe di Giacomo
- Bishop of Bovino
- Church: Catholic Church
- Diocese: Diocese of Bovino
- In office: 1673–1684
- Predecessor: Francesco Antonio Curzio
- Successor: Angelo Cerasi

Orders
- Ordination: 30 September 1657
- Consecration: 12 March 1673 by Gasparo Carpegna

Personal details
- Born: 3 November 1632 Messina, Italy
- Died: 21 March 1684 (age 51) Bovino, Italy

Giuseppe di Giacomo (3 November, 1632 – 21 March, 1684) was a Roman Catholic prelate who served as Bishop of Bovino (1673–1684).

== Biography ==
Giuseppe di Giacomo was born in Messina, Italy on 3 November 1632 and ordained a priest on 30 September 1657. On 27 February 1673, he was appointed during the papacy of Pope Clement X as Bishop of Bovino. On 12 March 1673, he was consecrated bishop by Gasparo Carpegna, Cardinal-Priest of San Silvestro in Capite, with Alessandro Crescenzi (cardinal), Titular Patriarch of Alexandria, and Hyacinthe Libelli, Archbishop of Avignon, serving as co-consecrators. He served as Bishop of Bovino until his death on 21 March 1684.

== Episcopal succession ==
While bishop, he was the principal co-consecrator of:

- Carlo Pellegrini (bishop), Bishop of Avellino e Frigento (1673);
- Domenico Sorrentino, Bishop of Ruvo (1673);
- Stefan Knezevic (Conti), Archbishop of Sardica (1677); and
- Gaspar Gasparini, Titular Bishop of Spiga (1677).

== See also ==
- Catholic Church in Italy

Catholic Church titles
Preceded by Francesco Antonio Curzio	Bishop of Bovino; 1673–1684	Succeeded by Angelo Cerasi
