= Lucchetti =

Lucchetti or Luchetti is an Italian surname. Notable people with the surname include:

== Lucchetti ==
- Antonio S. Lucchetti (1888–1958), Puerto Rican electrical engineer and public servant
- Cristian Lucchetti (born 1978), Argentine footballer
- Domenico Lucchetti (1623–1707), Italian Roman Catholic bishop
- Héctor Lucchetti, Argentine fencer
- Luis Lucchetti (1902–1990), Argentine fencer
- Rubens Francisco Lucchetti, Brazilian writer
- Vittorio Lucchetti (1894–1965), Italian gymnast

== Luchetti ==
- Cathy Luchetti (born 1945), American author
- Daniele Luchetti (born 1960), Italian film director, screenwriter and actor
- Emily Luchetti, American chef
- Laura Luchetti (born 1974), Italian film director
- Rosario Luchetti (born 1984), Argentine Olympic field hockey player
- Sergio Luchetti (born 1958), Argentine Olympic fencer
- Tony Luchetti (1904–1984), Australian politician
- Veriano Luchetti (1939–2012), Italian tenor
- Walter Luchetti (born 1937), Italian politician
