= Bovino Cathedral =

Cathedral in Bovino, Apulia, Italy

Coordinates: 41.251447°N 15.341000°E

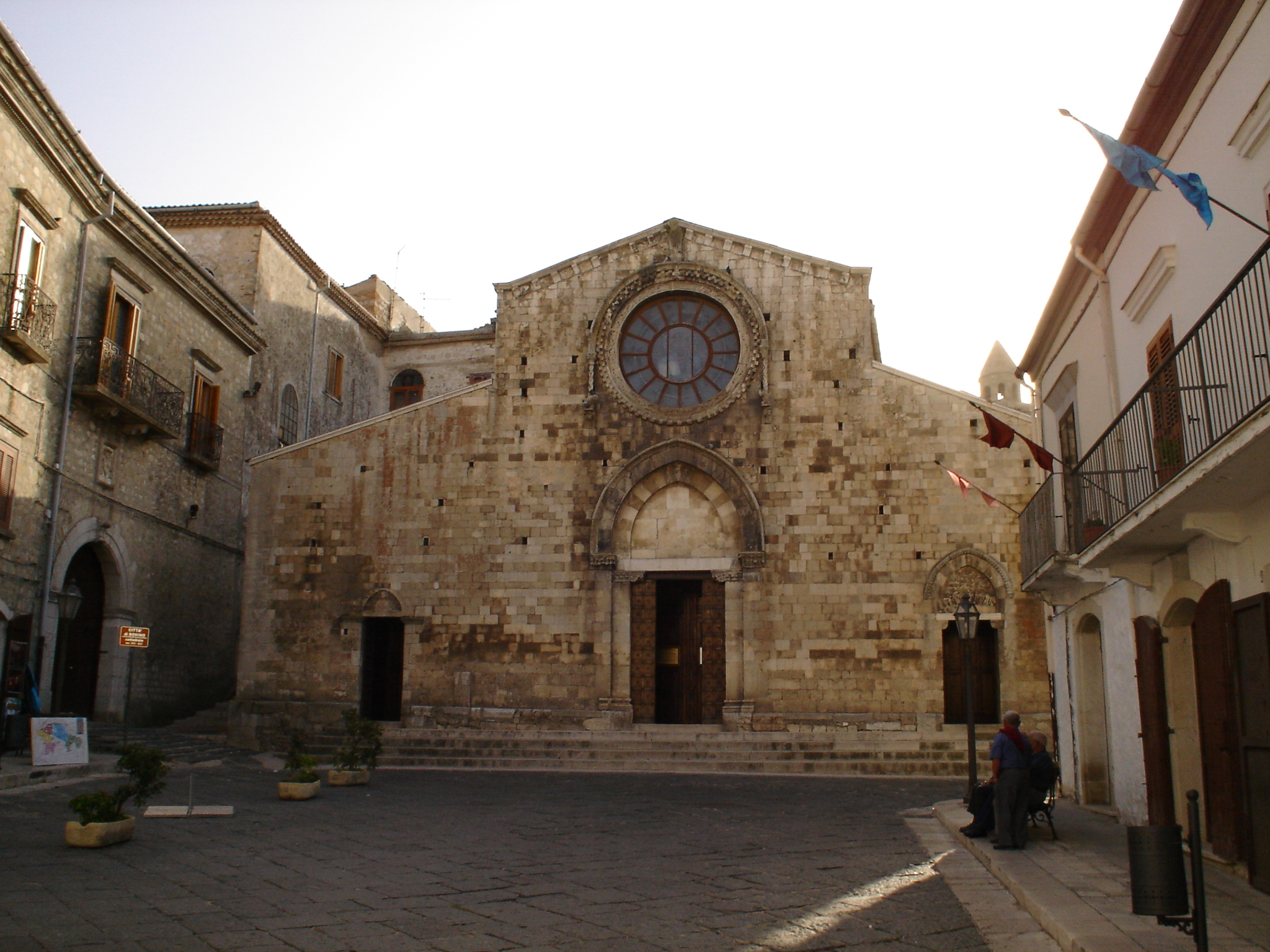
West front of the cathedral

Bovino Cathedral (Italian: Duomo di Bovino; Basilica Concattedrale di Santa Maria Assunta) is a Roman Catholic cathedral in Bovino, region of Apulia, Italy, dedicated to the Assumption of the Virgin Mary. Formerly the episcopal seat of the Diocese of Bovino, it has been since 1986 a co-cathedral in the Archdiocese of Foggia-Bovino.

The site is an ancient one, but the cathedral was destroyed in an earthquake in 1930 and the present building is a 20th-century reconstruction, re-consecrated in 1936.

The cathedral was granted the status of a minor basilica in 1970.

== See also ==
- Catholic Church in Italy
