= Gaspare Carpegna =

Italian cardinal

His Eminence Gaspare Carpegna
- Cardinal-Bishop of Sabina
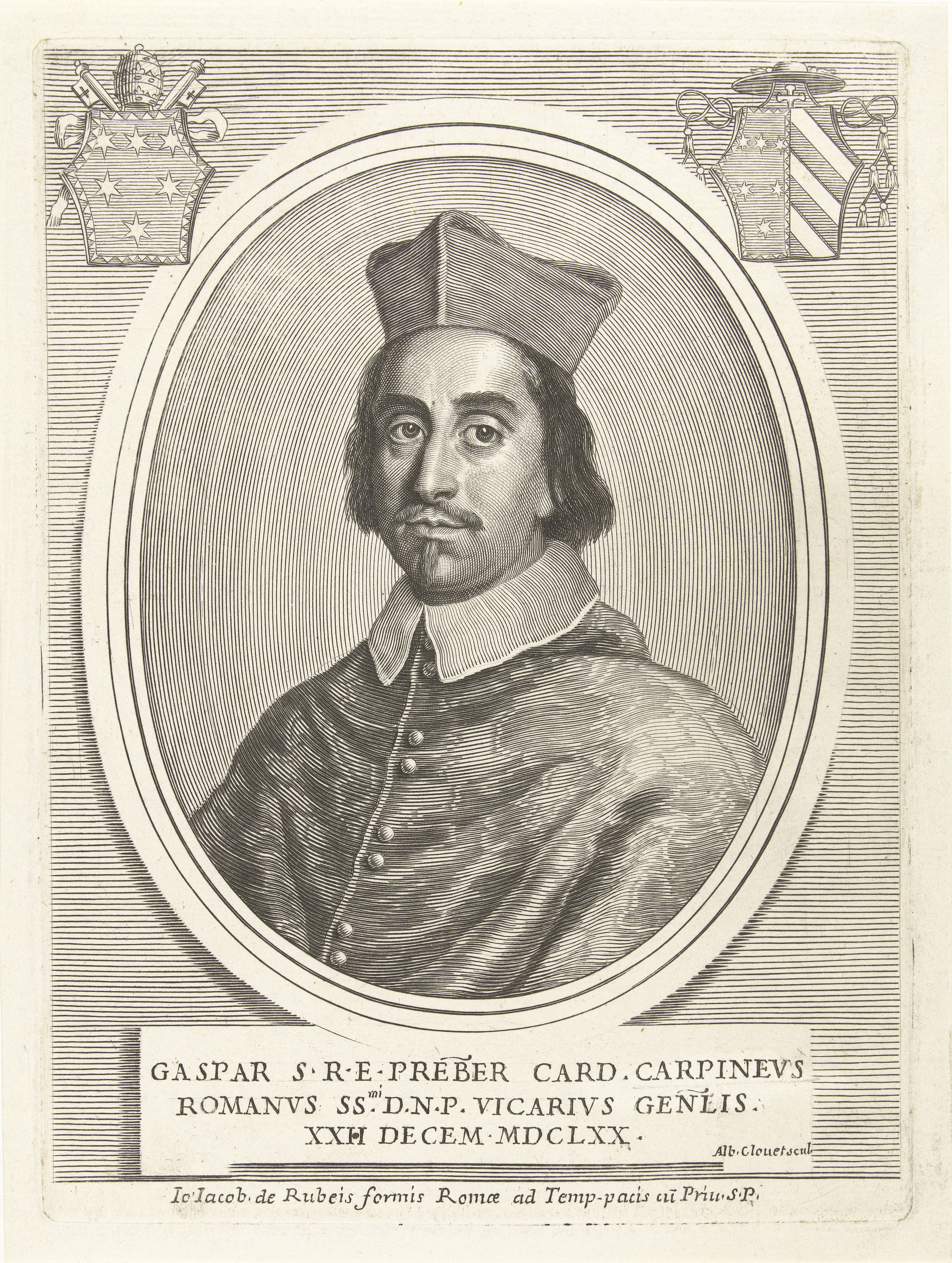
- Predecessor: Giannicolò Conti
- Successor: Fulvio Astalli

Orders
- Consecration: 22 June 1670 by Paluzzo Paluzzi Altieri Degli Albertoni
- Rank: Cardinal-Bishop

Personal details
- Born: 8 April 1625 Rome, Italy
- Died: 6 May 1714 (aged 89)
- Denomination: Roman Catholic

Gaspare Carpegna (8 April 1625 – 6 May 1714) was an Italian Catholic Cardinal.

== Early life ==
Gaspare was born in 1625 in Rome. His mother was from the Spada family. He was a relative of the Cardinal Ulderico Carpegna of the Holy Roman Catholic Church who died in 1679. He was born in Rome on 8 May 1625, in the family of the Counts of Carpegna, the Montefeltro. The mother was a descendant of the aristocratic Spada family.

== Ecclesiastic career ==
He was indirectly linked to Pope Clement X Altieri, since the pope's nephew had married Carpegna's sister. This pope elevated him to the rank of cardinal in the consistory of 1670. He was made a cardinal on 29 December 1670. He was known for assembling a large library, as well as a medallion and coin collection. On 8 August 1671, Clement X appointed him cardinal vicar, when he had to replace Cardinal Paluzzo degli Albertoni Altieri, who had been adopted into the Altieri family. Cardinal Carpegna firmly held the vicarage until death, for over forty years, well below the following five popes: Clement X, Innocent XI, Pope Alexander VIII, Innocent XII, and Clement XI.

He was an influential member of the Curia and associated with numerous congregations. He was a member of the cultural Arcadia Society in 1695, skilled in court manoeuvres, very severe in repressing abuses, and also attempted to gain the papacy in the Conclave of 1689, which ended up elevating Alexander VIII Ottoboni. The hostility of France and the Grand Duchy of Tuscany to his candidacy blocked Carpegna's election.

Incapacitated in 1707 by a stroke, he died on 6 April 1714 at the age of eighty-nine, and was buried in the family tomb in Santa Maria in Vallicella.

== Episcopal succession ==
Episcopal succession of Gaspare Carpegna

While bishop, he was the principal consecrator of:

- Ippolito Vicentini, Bishop of Rieti (1671);
- Fabrizio Spada, Titular Archbishop of Patrae (1672);
- Hyacinthe Libelli, Archbishop of Avignon (1673);
- Simon Gaudenti, Bishop of Ossero (1673);
- Andrea Francolisio d'Aquino, Bishop of Tricarico (1673);
- Giuseppe di Giacomo, Bishop of Bovino (1673);
- Carlo Francesco Airoldi, Titular Archbishop of Edessa in Osrhoëne (1673);
- Giuseppe Pianetti, Bishop of Todi (1673);
- Lodovico Magni, Bishop of Acquapendente (1674);
- Alfonso Pacella, Bishop of Muro Lucano (1674);
- Giuseppe de Lazzara, Bishop of Alife (1676);
- Vincenzo Cavalli, Bishop of Bertinoro (1676);
- Antonio Savo de' Panicoli, Bishop of Termoli (1678);
- Louis d'Anglure de Bourlemont, Bishop of Fréjus (1679);
- Gaetano Miraballi, Archbishop of Amalfi (1679);
- Carlo Molza, Bishop of Modena (1679);
- Francesco Berardino Corradini, Bishop of Marsi (1680);
- Carlo Riggio, Bishop of Mazara del Vallo (1681);
- Federico Visconti, Archbishop of Milan (1681);
- Stefano Ricciardi, Bishop of Nepi e Sutri (1681);
- Giacomo Antonio Morigia, Bishop of San Miniato (1681);
- Francesco Maria Caffori, Bishop of Castro di Puglia (1681);
- Leonardo Marsili, Archbishop of Siena (1682);
- Fabrizio Paolucci, Bishop of Macerata e Tolentino (1685);
- Gasparo Cavalieri, Archbishop of Capua (1687);
- Franciscus Liberati, Titular Archbishop of Ephesus (1688);
- Giorgio Emo, Archbishop of Corfù (1688);
- Giovanni Vusich, Bishop of Nona (1688);
- Bandino Panciatici, Titular Patriarch of Jerusalem (1689);
- Giacomo Boncompagni, Archbishop of Bologna (1690);
- Marco Battista Battaglini, Bishop of Nocera Umbra (1690);
- Michele Antonio Vibò, Archbishop of Turin (1690);
- Paolo Vallaresso, Bishop of Concordia (1693);
- Andrea Riggio, Bishop of Catania (1693);
- Michelangelo Veraldi, Bishop of Martirano (1693);
- Juan Alfonso Valerià y Aloza, Bishop of Solsona (1694);
- Giuseppe Olgiati, Bishop of Parma (1694);
- Francesco Acquaviva d'Aragona, Titular Archbishop of Larissa in Thessalia (1697);
- Giulio Piazza, Titular Archbishop of Rhodus (1697);

and the principal co-consecrator of:

- Giovanni Francesco Albani, Pope (1700); and
- Charles Thomas Maillard de Tournon, Titular Patriarch of Antioch (1701).

Catholic Church titles
| Preceded by Jacques de La Haye | Titular Archbishop of Nicaea; 1670 | Succeeded by Carlo Vaini |
| Preceded by Louis de Vendôme | Cardinal-Priest of Santa Maria in Portico; 1671 | Succeeded by Felice Rospigliosi |
| Preceded by Rinaldo d'Este | Cardinal-Priest of Santa Pudenziana; 1671–1672 | Succeeded by Girolamo Gastaldi |
| Preceded by Carlo Rossetti | Cardinal-Priest of San Silvestro in Capite; 1672–1689 | Succeeded by Girolamo Casanate |
| Preceded by Ottavio Bandini | Prefect of the Congregation of Bishops and Regulars; 1675–1714 | Succeeded by Fabrizio Paolucci |
| Preceded by Giulio Spinola | Cardinal-Priest of Santa Maria in Trastevere; 1689–1698 | Succeeded by Giambattista Spínola |
| Preceded by Giannicolò Conti | Cardinal-Bishop of Sabina; 1698–1714 | Succeeded by Fulvio Astalli |
Records
| Preceded by Henri Albert de la Grange d'Arquien | Oldest living Member of the Sacred College; 24 May 1707 - 6 May 1714 | Succeeded by Galeazzo Marescotti |
