= Hyacinthe Libelli =

Italian Roman Catholic prelate

Most Reverend Hyacinthe Libelli
- Archbishop of Avignon
- Church: Catholic Church
- Archdiocese: Archdiocese of Avignon
- In office: 1673–1684
- Predecessor: Azon Ariosti
- Successor: Alexandre de Montecatini

Orders
- Consecration: 24 February 1673 by Gasparo Carpegna

Personal details
- Born: 1616 Citta di Castello, Italy
- Died: 23 October 1684 (age 68) Avignon, France

Hyacinthe Libelli, O.P. (1616 – 23 October 1684) was a Roman Catholic prelate who served as Archbishop of Avignon (1673–1684).

== Biography ==
Hyacinthe Libelli was born in Citta di Castello, Italy in 1616 and ordained a priest in the Order of Preachers . From 1630 to 1634 he was a student at the College of Saint Thomas, the future Pontifical University of St. Thomas Aquinas, the Angelicum, in Rome. In 1644 he was made a Doctor of Sacred Theology at the college. On 30 January 1673, he was appointed during the papacy of Pope Clement X as Archbishop of Avignon. On 24 February 1673, he was consecrated bishop by Gasparo Carpegna, Cardinal-Priest of San Silvestro in Capite, with Stefano Brancaccio, Bishop of Viterbo e Tuscania, and Carlo Vaini, Titular Archbishop of Nicaea, serving as co-consecrators. He served as Archbishop of Avignon until his death on 23 October 1684.

== Episcopal succession ==
While bishop, he was the principal co-consecrator of:

- Simon Gaudenti, Bishop of Ossero (1673);
- Andrea Francolisio, Bishop of Tricarico (1673); and
- Giuseppe di Giacomo, Bishop of Bovino (1673).

== External links and additional sources ==
- Cheney, David M. "Archdiocese of Avignon". Catholic-Hierarchy.org. (for Chronology of Bishops) ^{[self-published]}
- Chow, Gabriel. "Archdiocese of Avignon". GCatholic.org. (for Chronology of Bishops) ^{[self-published]}

Catholic Church titles
Preceded by Azon Ariosti	Archbishop of Avignon; 1673–1684	Succeeded by Alexandre de Montecatini
