= Paluzzo Paluzzi Altieri degli Albertoni =

Italian cardinal

His Eminence Paluzzo Paluzzi Altieri degli Albertoni
- Cardinal Bishop of Porto e Santa Rufina
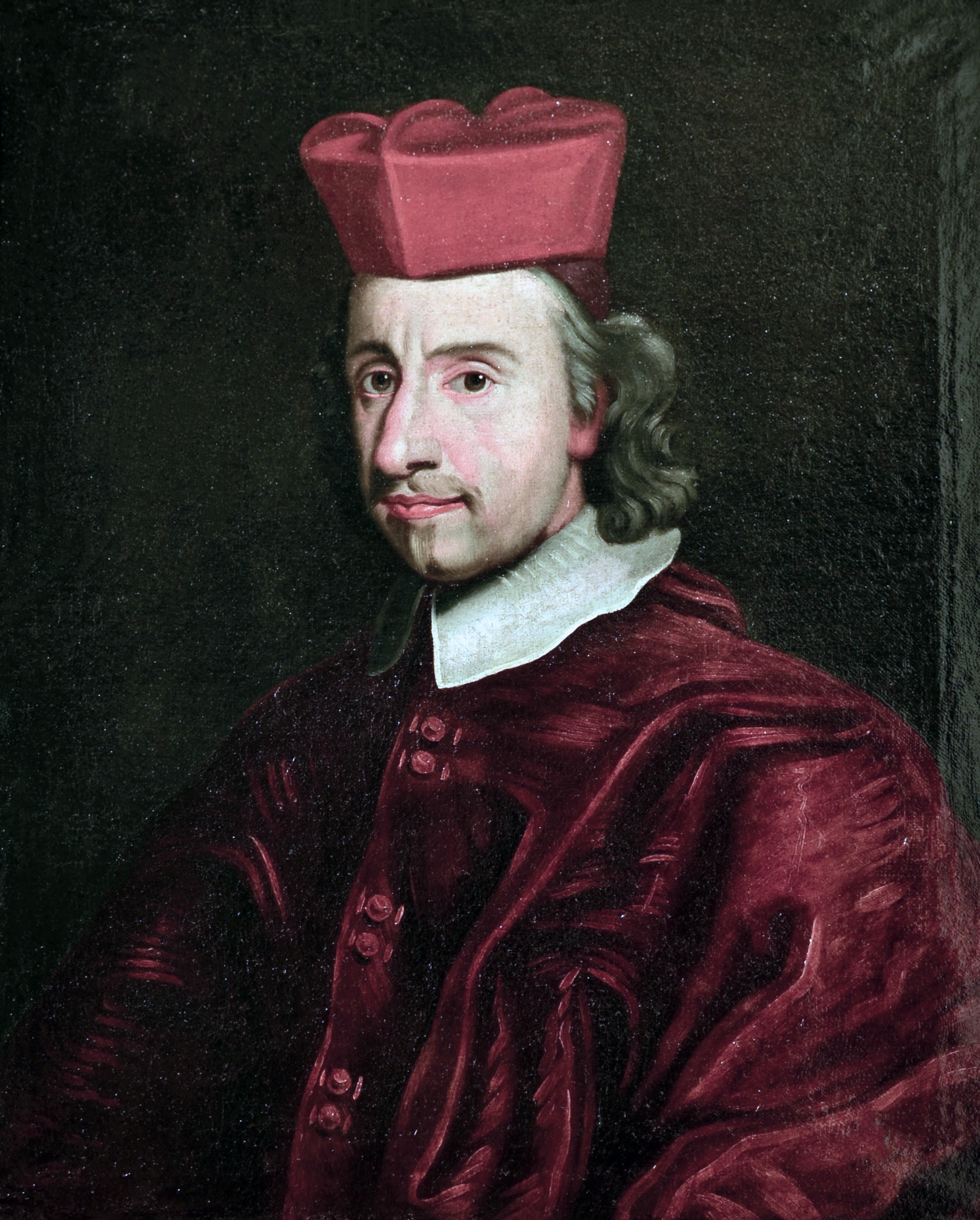
- Church: Roman Catholic Church
- Appointed: 27 January 1698
- Term ended: 29 June 1698
- Predecessor: Giacomo Franzoni
- Successor: Emmanuel-Theódose de la Tour d'Auvergne de Bouillon

Orders
- Consecration: 2 May 1666 by Ulderico Carpegna
- Created cardinal: 14 January 1664 by Pope Alexander VII
- Rank: Cardinal-Bishop

Personal details
- Born: 8 June 1623 Rome, Papal States
- Died: 29 June 1698 (age 75) Rome, Papal States
- Buried: Santa Maria in Campitelli

Paluzzo Paluzzi Altieri degli Albertoni (8 June 1623 – 29 June 1698) was an Italian Catholic Cardinal and Cardinal-Nephew to Pope Clement X.

== Biography ==
Altieri was born Paluzzo Paluzzi degli Albertoni in Rome, the eldest of two sons to Antonio Paluzzi degli Albertoni (second Marquis of Rasina) and Laura Carpegna. He studied at the University of Perugia and earned a doctorate of law. Thereafter he became a cleric of the Apostolic Chamber during the final part of the pontificate of Pope Urban VIII and during the pontificate of Pope Innocent X. He became Auditor-General of the Apostolic Chamber during the pontificate of Pope Alexander VII.

In 1664, Altieri was elevated to Cardinal in pectore by Pope Alexander VII. His elevation to cardinal was published in 1666 and he was made Cardinal-Priest of Santi Apostoli, Rome. The following month he was elected Bishop of Montefiascone e Corneto and consecrated by his mother's relative, Cardinal Ulderico Carpegna. He participated in the conclave of 1667 which elected Pope Clement IX.

Over the following few years he became a close advisor to Cardinal Emilio Altieri. At the papal conclave of 1669–1670 Altieri was elected as Pope Clement X. On the day of his election, since there were no more male descendants in the Altieri family, he adopted Paluzzo and he changed his name to Paluzzo Paluzzi Altieri degli Albertoni in honour of his new adoptive uncle. Thereafter he became Clement's Cardinal-Nephew. In May 1670 he was appointed Bishop of Ravenna and papal legate in Avignon.

In 1671, Altieri was named Prefect of the Sacred Consulta Propaganda Fide (a position he held until his death) and was made Governor of Tivoli. That same year he was appointed Camerlengo of the Holy Roman Church and Crown-cardinal of Ireland (he held both positions until 1698).

Between 1673 and 1677 he was made legate in Urbino and during that period he was made Secretary of the Apostolic Briefs, resigned the diocese of Ravenna and, when Pope Clement died, he participated in the conclave of 1676 which elected Pope Innocent XI.

Altieri was appointed, or appointed himself, to so many positions he was accused by his contemporaries of megalomania. Though he had established a well-regarded ecclesiastic career, his limited diplomatic experience caused problems for the Pope and for the Holy See, even after Clement's death.

Between 1678 and 1679 he was also appointed Camerlengo of the Sacred College of Cardinals (he was already Camerlengo of the Holy Roman Church).

He was appointed Cardinal-Priest of San Crisogono (1681), Cardinal-Priest of S. Maria in Trastevere (1684) and then Cardinal-Bishop of Sabina in 1689 before participating in the conclave of 1689 which elected Pope Alexander VIII. He participated in the conclave of 1691 which elected Pope Innocent XII and was thereafter appointed Cardinal-Bishop of Palestrina. He was made Archpriest of the Patriarchal Lateran Basilica in 1693 and Bishop of Porto e Santa Rufina and Sub-Dean of the College of Cardinals in January 1698.

Six months later, on 29 June 1698, he died suddenly at his dinner table. He was waked in the Church of Santa Maria in Campitelli and buried in the chapel of St. John the Baptist (Italian: San Giovanni Battist) which he had commissioned at the church.

Altieri’s death inventory lists in great detail the contents of his collection of paintings and furniture displayed in his apartment in the Altieri palace in Rome.

== Episcopal succession ==
Ulderico Carpegna consecrated Altieri to the episcopacy on 2 May 1666. Having himself consecrated Pope Benedict XIII to the episcopacy, Cardinal Altieri is in the episcopal lineage of Pope Francis.

== Episcopal succession ==
Episcopal succession of Francesco Maria Brancaccio

While bishop, he was the principal consecrator of:

- Azon Ariosti, Archbishop of Avignon (1669);
- Gasparo Carpegna, Titular Archbishop of Nicaea (1670);
- Pietro Francesco Orsini de Gravina, Archbishop of Manfredonia (1675) (later Pope Benedict XIII);
- Juan Tomás de Rocaberti, Archbishop of Valencia (1677);
- Nicola Oliva, Bishop of Cortona (1677);
- Giovanni Borgoforte, Bishop of Nona (1677);
- Antonio de Monroy y Hijar, Archbishop of Santiago de Compostela (1685);
- Flavio Chigi (seniore), Cardinal-Bishop of Albano (1686);
- Leone Strozzi, Bishop of Pistoia e Prato (1690);
- Raimondo Ferretti, Bishop of Recanati e Loreto (1690);
- Laurent Buti (Buzzi), Bishop of Carpentras (1691);
- José Guerrero de Torres, Bishop of Gaeta (1693); and
- Gianfrancesco Bembo (bishop), Bishop of Belluno (1694).

Catholic Church titles
Preceded by Francesco Maria Brancaccio	Cardinal-Priest of Santi Apostoli; 1666–1681	Succeeded by Francesco Lorenzo Brancati
Preceded by Gasparo Cecchinelli	Bishop of Corneto e Montefiascone; 1666–1670	Succeeded by Domenico Massimo
Preceded by Luca Torreggiani	Archbishop of Ravenna; 1670–1674	Succeeded by Fabio Guinigi
Preceded by Marzio Ginetti	Cardinal Vicar; 1671	Succeeded by Gasparo Carpegna
Preceded by Antonio Barberini	Camerlengo of the Holy Roman Church; 1671–1698	Succeeded by Galeazzo Marescotti (pro-camerlengo)
Preceded by Antonio Barberini	Prefect of the Sacred Consulta Propaganda Fide; 1671–1698	Succeeded by Carlo Barberini
Preceded by Carlo Carafa della Spina	Camerlengo of the Sacred College of Cardinals; 1678–1679	Succeeded by Giacomo Filippo Nini
Preceded by Carlo Pio di Savoia	Cardinal-Priest of San Crisogono; 1681–1684	Succeeded by Giulio Spinola
Preceded by Decio Azzolini (iuniore)	Cardinal-Priest of Santa Maria in Trastevere; 1684–1689	Succeeded by Giulio Spinola
Preceded by Carlo Pio di Savoia (iuniore)	Cardinal-Bishop of Sabina; 1689–1691	Succeeded by Giannicolò Conti
Preceded by Antonio Bichi	Cardinal-Bishop of Palestrina; 1691–1698	Succeeded by Luis Manuel Fernández de Portocarrero
Preceded by Flavio Chigi	Archpriest of the Basilica of St. John Lateran; 1693–1698	Succeeded by Fabrizio Spada
Preceded by Giacomo Franzoni	Cardinal-Bishop of Porto-Santa Rufina; 1698	Succeeded by Emmanuel Théodose de la Tour
