= Sant'Agata in Cantalena, Cortona =

Church in Cortona, Italy

Coordinates: 43.27153°N 11.93170°E

Sant'Agata in Cantalena, a frazione of the town of Cortona in Province of Arezzo, is an ancient Roman-Catholic church, built during the early Renaissance.

The church was founded in 1274–1275, and rebuilt in 1426, when it was made a parish church. It contains a Madonna and child with Saints Michael, and Agatha (1523) painted by Turpino Zaccagnini. The baptismal font was built in 1659. The west facade has frescoes by the painter from Amalfi, Ignazio Lucibello (1904-1970), who taught design in Cortona. It was restored again in 2013.
