= Cerasi =

Cerasi is a surname. Notable people with the surname include:

- Angelo Cerasi (1643–1728), Italian Roman Catholic bishop
- Tiberio Cerasi (1544–1601), Italian jurist and papal treasurer-general
