= Ludovico Serristori =

Catholic prelate

- Diocese of Cortona
- Church: Catholic Church
- Appointed: 25 September 1634
- Term ended: 4 August 1656
- Other post: Inquisitor general in Malta

Orders
- Ordination: 19 March 1633 (Priest)
- Consecration: 12 November 1634 (Bishop) by Giulio Cesare Sacchetti

Personal details
- Born: 1600 Florence, Grand Duchy of Tuscany
- Died: 4 August 1656 (aged 55–56) Cortona, Grand Duchy of Tuscany
- Buried: Cortona Cathedral

Ludovico Serristori (1600–1656) was a Catholic prelate who served as inquisitor general in Malta (1630–1631) and as Bishop of Cortona (1634–1656).

== Life ==
Ludovico Serristori was born to a noble family in Florence in 1600, son of senator Luigi. He graduated in utroque iure in Pisa. He took up a career in the administration of the Papal States: he was made Referendary of the Tribunals of the Apostolic Signature of Justice and of Grace, and served as Vice-legato in Ferrara from September 1628 to March 1630.

He was appointed inquisitor general in Malta on 29 May 1630. Serristori arrived in Malta in October 1630. He presided over a general chapter of the Order of Malta and headed the diocese of Malta after Bishop Baldassare Cagliares was declared unfit for office.

He left Malta at the end of 1631 and soon after became a consultor to the Roman Inquisition. Ludovico Serristori was ordained a priest on 19 March 1633. He also supervised the papal army in Ferrara.

On 25 September 1634, he was appointed Bishop of Cortona, and he was consecrated bishop on 12 November 1634 in the Roman church of San Giovanni dei Fiorentini by cardinal Giulio Cesare Sacchetti. In 1639 he served as ambassador in Germany for the Grand Duke Ferdinando II de' Medici. He remained bishop of Cortona until his death in Cortona on 4 August 1656. He was buried in the cathedral of that town.
