= Vincenzo Roviglioni =

Italian Roman Catholic prelate

Most Reverend Angelo Giustiniani
- Bishop of Bovino
- Church: Catholic Church
- Diocese: Diocese of Bovino
- In office: 1658–1669
- Predecessor: Giovanni Antonio Galderisi
- Successor: Francesco Antonio Curzio

Personal details
- Died: 14 September 1669 Bovino, Kingdom of Naples

Vincenzo Roviglioni (died 14 September 1669) was a Roman Catholic prelate who served as Bishop of Bovino (1658–1669).

== Biography ==
On 3 June 1658, Vincenzo Roviglioni was appointed during the papacy of Pope Alexander VII as Bishop of Bovino. He served as Bishop of Bovino until his death on 14 September 1669.

Catholic Church titles
Preceded by Giovanni Antonio Galderisi	Bishop of Bovino; 1658–1669	Succeeded by Francesco Antonio Curzio
