= Angelo Giustiniani =

Italian Roman Catholic prelate

Most Reverend Angelo Giustiniani
- Bishop of Bovino
- Church: Catholic Church
- Diocese: Diocese of Bovino
- In office: 1578–1600
- Predecessor: Giovanni Domenico D'Anna
- Successor: Paolo Tolosa

Personal details
- Died: 26 August 1600 Bovino, Italy

Angelo Giustiniani (died 26 August 1600) was a Roman Catholic prelate who served as Bishop of Bovino (1578–1600).

On 14 May 1578, Angelo Giustiniani was appointed during the papacy of Pope Gregory XIII as Bishop of Bovino. He served as Bishop of Bovino until his death on 26 Aug 1600.

Catholic Church titles
Preceded by Giovanni Domenico D'Anna	Bishop of Bovino; 1578–1600	Succeeded by Paolo Tolosa
