= Antonio Lucci =

Italian bishop

Blessed Bishop Antonio Lucci O.F.M. Conv.
- Bishop of Bovino
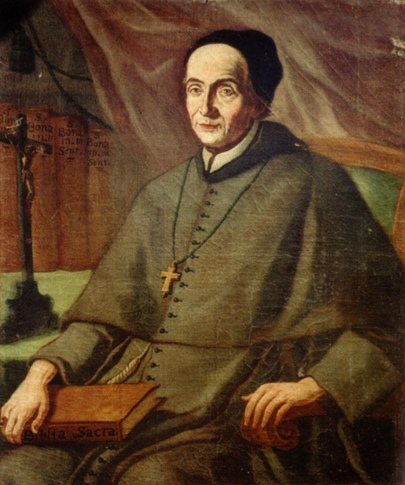
- Church: Catholic
- Diocese: Bovino
- See: Bovino
- Appointed: 7 February 1729
- Term ended: 25 July 1752
- Predecessor: Angelo Cerasi
- Successor: Tommaso Pacelli

Orders
- Ordination: 19 September 1705
- Consecration: 13 February 1729 by Pope Benedict XIII
- Rank: Bishop

Personal details
- Born: Angelo Nicola Lucci; 2 August 1681 Agnone, Isernia, Kingdom of Naples
- Died: 25 July 1752 (aged 70) Bovino, Foggia, Kingdom of Naples

Sainthood
- Feast day: 25 July
- Venerated in: Catholic Church
- Beatified: 18 June 1989; Saint Peter's Square, Vatican City by Pope John Paul II
- Attributes: Franciscan habit; Episcopal attire

Antonio Lucci (2 August 1682 – 25 July 1752), born Angelo Nicola Lucci, was an Italian Catholic professed member from the Order of Friars Minor Conventual (the "Franciscans") and served as the Bishop of Bovino from 1729 until his death.

The beatification cause started on 5 December 1764 under Pope Clement XIII while he was later titled as Venerable on 13 June 1847 under Pope Pius IX. Pope John Paul II beatified Lucci on 18 June 1989 in Saint Peter's Square.

== Life ==
Angelo Nicola Lucci was born on 2 August 1682 to the cobbler and coppersmith Francesco Lucci and his wife, Angela Paolantonio.

He attended the local school that the Franciscans managed and later joined them in 1698. Lucci made his solemn profession in 1698 in the religious name of "Antonio".

He completed his studies for the priesthood in Assisi where he was ordained in 1705. He studied rhetoric and philosophical studies at Venagro and Alvito as well as in Aversa before doing theological studies at Agnone. Further studies led to a doctorate in theological studies and appointments as a professor in Agnone as well as at the Franciscan school in Ravello (from 1709 to 1712) and at the Franciscan school of San Lorenzo in Naples (from 1713 to 1718). He also served as guardian of the convent in Naples.

Lucci was elected as the Minister Provincial in 1718 and held that post until 1719; in 1719, he was appointed as a professor at the Pontifical University of St. Bonaventure in Rome and remained there until his appointment to the episcopate. In 1725, he received instructions from Pope Benedict XIII to write against Jansenism. It was rumored that Benedict XIII would appoint him as a cardinal but this did not happen: the pope had decided to name him in 1729 as the Bishop of Bovino and explained of the appointment: "I have chosen as Bishop of Bovino an eminent theologian and a great saint". Benedict XIII himself conferred episcopal consecration upon Lucci in Saint Peter's Basilica.

Lucci had a reputation for being reserved but his episcopate was marked with frequent visits to his local parishes in the diocese as well as a renewal of Gospel application amongst the faithful; he dedicated his episcopal income to works of education and set up free schools. He repaired churches and enforced discipline on priests who indulged in vanities. He also visiting hermits to ensure the magisterium was being upheld in those places of hermitage. The Minister General for his order requested he write a hagiographical account in 1740 and so he wrote a major book about the Franciscan saints and blesseds in the first two centuries.

Lucci studied with, and was a close friend of Francis Fasani who, after Lucci's death, testified on 29 November 1742, at the diocesan hearings regarding the holiness of Lucci's life; he and Fasani were both ordained as priests together. Alphonsus Maria de' Liguori wrote of Lucci and heaped great praise upon him.

Lucci died in of a high fever in mid-1752 and his remains were interred in the Bovino Cathedral.

== Beatification ==
The cause commenced under Pope Clement XIII on 5 December 1764 and Lucci became titled as a Servant of God while Pope Pius IX confirmed that Lucci had lived a model life of heroic virtue and so named him as Venerable on 13 June 1847.

The informative process for the miracle needed for beatification spanned from 1779 until 1780 and received validation in Rome from the Congregation for Rites on 10 September 1782 before a medical board met and approved this miracle two centuries later on 3 February 1988. Theologians approved the miracle on 7 July 1988 as did the Congregation for the Causes of Saints on 8 November 1988. Pope John Paul II approved this miracle on 28 November 1988 and beatified Lucci on 18 June 1989 in Saint Peter's Square.

The current postulator for this cause is Fra Angelo Paleri.
