= Giovanni Antonio Galderisi =

Italian Roman Catholic prelate

Most Reverend Giovanni Antonio Galderisi
- Bishop of Bovino
- Church: Catholic Church
- Diocese: Diocese of Bovino
- In office: 1616–1658
- Predecessor: Paolo Tolosa
- Successor: Vincenzo Roviglioni

Orders
- Consecration: 24 January 1616 by Giovanni Garzia Mellini

Personal details
- Born: 1577 Monopoli, Kingdom of Naples
- Died: 1658 (age 81) Bovino, Kingdom of Naples

Giovanni Antonio Galderisi (1577–1658) was a Roman Catholic prelate who served as Bishop of Bovino (1616–1658).

== Biography ==
Giovanni Antonio Galderisi was born in Monopoli, Italy in 1577. On 11 January 1616, he was appointed during the papacy of Pope Paul V as Bishop of Bovino. On 24 January 1616, he was consecrated bishop by Giovanni Garzia Mellini, Cardinal-Priest of Santi Quattro Coronati, with Lucio de Morra, Archbishop of Otranto, and Alessandro Guidiccioni (iuniore), Bishop of Lucca, serving as co-consecrators. He served as Bishop of Bovino until his death in 1658.

Catholic Church titles
Preceded by Paolo Tolosa	Bishop of Bovino; 1616–1658	Succeeded by Vincenzo Roviglioni
