= Giovanni Gambacorta =

Roman Catholic Bishop

Most Reverend Giovanni Gambacorta
- Bishop of Marsico Nuovo
- Church: Catholic Church
- Diocese: Diocese of Marsico Nuovo
- In office: 1676–1683
- Predecessor: Giovanni Battista Falvo
- Successor: Francesco Antonio Leopardi

Orders
- Consecration: 26 April 1676 by Camillo Massimi

Personal details
- Born: 1613 Limatola, Italy
- Died: 25 May 1683 (age 70) Marsico Nuovo, Italy

Giovanni Gambacorta, C.R. (1613 – 25 May 1683) was a Roman Catholic prelate who served as Bishop of Marsico Nuovo (1676–1683).

== Biography ==
Giovanni Gambacorta was born in Limatola, Italy and ordained a priest in the Congregation of Clerics Regular of the Divine Providence.

On 23 March 1676, he was appointed during the papacy of Pope Clement X as Bishop of Marsico Nuovo. On 26 April 1676, he was consecrated bishop by Camillo Massimi, Cardinal-Priest of Sant'Eusebio, and Egidio Colonna (patriarch), Titular Patriarch of Jerusalem, and Angelo della Noca, Archbishop Emeritus of Rossano, serving as co-consecrators. He served as Bishop of Marsico Nuovo until his death on 25 May 1683.

== External links and additional sources ==
- Cheney, David M. "Diocese of Marsico Nuovo". Catholic-Hierarchy.org. (for Chronology of Bishops) (for Chronology of Bishops) ^{[self-published]}
- Chow, Gabriel. "Diocese of Marsico Nuovo (Italy)". GCatholic.org. (for Chronology of Bishops) (for Chronology of Bishops) ^{[self-published]}

Catholic Church titles
Preceded by Giovanni Battista Falvo	Bishop of Marsico Nuovo; 1676–1683	Succeeded by Francesco Antonio Leopardi
