= Domenico Massimo =

Italian bishop

Most Reverend Domenico Massimo
- Bishop of Corneto (Tarquinia) e Montefiascone
- Church: Catholic Church
- Diocese: Diocese of Corneto (Tarquinia) e Montefiascone)
- In office: 1671–1685
- Predecessor: Paluzzo Paluzzi Altieri Degli Albertoni
- Successor: Marcantonio Barbarigo

Orders
- Ordination: 5 March 1667
- Consecration: 30 March 1671 by Camillo Massimi

Personal details
- Born: 1630 Rome, Italy
- Died: September 1685 (age 55)

Domenico Massimo (1630 – September 1685) was a Roman Catholic prelate who served as Bishop of Corneto (Tarquinia) e Montefiascone (1671–1685).

He was born in Rome, Italy in 1630 and was ordained as a priest on 5 March 1667. On 18 March 1671, he was appointed during the papacy of Pope Clement X as Bishop of Corneto (Tarquinia) e Montefiascone. On 30 March 1671, he was consecrated bishop by Camillo Massimi, Cardinal-Priest of Santa Maria in Domnica, with Alessandro Crescenzi (cardinal), Titular Patriarch of Alexandria, and Egidio Colonna (patriarch), Titular Patriarch of Jerusalem, serving as co-consecrators. He served as Bishop of Corneto (Tarquinia) e Montefiascone until his death in September 1685.

== External links and additional sources ==
- Cheney, David M. "Diocese of Montefiascone". Catholic-Hierarchy.org. (for Chronology of Bishops) ^{[self-published]}
- Chow, Gabriel. "Titular Episcopal See of Montefiascone (Italy)". GCatholic.org. (for Chronology of Bishops) ^{[self-published]}

Catholic Church titles
| Preceded by Paluzzo Paluzzi Altieri Degli Albertoni | Bishop of Corneto (Tarquinia) e Montefiascone; 1671–1685 | Succeeded by Marcantonio Barbarigo |
