= Nicola Oliva =

17th-century Catholic bishop

Most Reverend Nicola Oliva
- Bishop of Cortona
- Church: Catholic Church
- Diocese: Diocese of Cortona
- In office: 1677–1684
- Predecessor: Filippo Galilei
- Successor: Pietro Luigi Malaspina

Orders
- Consecration: 30 November 1677 by Paluzzo Paluzzi Altieri Degli Albertoni

Personal details
- Born: 1617 Siena, Italy
- Died: 13 March 1684 (age 67) Cortona, Italy

Nicola Oliva, O.S.A. (1617–1684) was a Roman Catholic prelate who served as Bishop of Cortona (1677–1684).

== Biography ==
Nicola Oliva was born in 1617 and ordained a priest in the Order of Saint Augustine. On 22 November 1677, he was appointed during the papacy of Pope Innocent XI as Bishop of Cortona. On 30 November 1677, he was consecrated bishop by Paluzzo Paluzzi Altieri Degli Albertoni, Camerlengo of the Apostolic Chamber, with Prospero Bottini, Titular Archbishop of Myra, and Lodovico Magni, Bishop of Acquapendente, serving as co-consecrators. He served as Bishop of Cortona until his death on 13 March 1684.

== External links and additional sources ==
- Cheney, David M. "Diocese of Cortona". Catholic-Hierarchy.org. (for Chronology of Bishops) ^{[self-published]}
- Chow, Gabriel. "Diocese of Cortona (Italy)". GCatholic.org. (for Chronology of Bishops) ^{[self-published]}

Catholic Church titles
Preceded by Filippo Galilei	Bishop of Cortona; 1677–1684	Succeeded by Pietro Luigi Malaspina
