= Angelo Cerasi =

Italian Roman Catholic prelate

Most Reverend Angelo Cerasi
- Bishop of Bovino
- Church: Catholic Church
- Diocese: Diocese of Bovino
- In office: 1685–1728
- Predecessor: Giuseppe di Giacomo
- Successor: Antonio Lucci

Orders
- Consecration: 11 February 1685 by Alessandro Crescenzi (cardinal)

Personal details
- Born: 15 October 1643 Buonabitacolo, Italy
- Died: 11 December 1728 (age 85) Bovino, Italy

Angelo Cerasi (15 October 1643 – 11 December 1728) was a Roman Catholic prelate who served as Bishop of Bovino (1685–1728).

== Biography ==
Angelo Cerasi was born in Buonabitacolo, Italy on 15 October 1643. On 5 February 1685, he was appointed during the papacy of Pope Innocent XI as Bishop of Bovino. On 11 February 1685, he was consecrated bishop by Alessandro Crescenzi (cardinal), Cardinal-Priest of Santa Prisca, with Pier Antonio Capobianco, Bishop Emeritus of Lacedonia, and Giuseppe Felice Barlacci, Bishop of Narni, serving as co-consecrators. He served as Bishop of Bovino until his death on 11 December 1728.

Catholic Church titles
Preceded by Giuseppe di Giacomo	Bishop of Bovino; 1685–1728	Succeeded by Antonio Lucci
