= Francis Fasani =

Christian saint

Saint Francis Anthony Fasani OFM Conv.
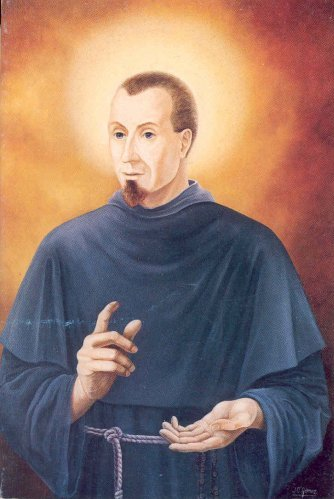
- Born: Giovanniello Fasani; 6 August 1681; Lucera, Foggia, Kingdom of Naples
- Died: 29 November 1742; Lucera, Foggia, Kingdom of Naples
- Venerated in: Roman Catholic Church (Franciscan Order)
- Beatified: 15 April 1951 by Pope Pius XII
- Canonized: 13 April 1986 by Pope John Paul II
- Feast: 29 November
- Patronage: Lucera

Francis Anthony Fasani, OFM Conv. (6 August 1681 – 29 November 1742) was an Italian friar of the Order of Conventual Friars Minor who has been declared a saint by the Catholic Church.

Fasani held a number of offices in the Franciscan order and was pastor of his home town. "He promoted devotion to Our Lady Immaculate and for nearly forty years was famous in Apulia for his fervent preaching and his great charity towards the poor, orphans, and prisoners."

== Early life ==
He was born Giovanniello Fasani on 6 August 1681 in Lucera, in the Province of Foggia, then part of the Kingdom of Naples. He was the son of Giuseppe Fasani and Isabella della Monaca. He began his studies at the Conventual friary in his town and there entered the order, taking the religious names of Francis and Anthony. Fasani professed his religious vows in 1696.

== Religious life ==
Once having professed his vows, Fasani began theological studies in Agnone, and continued them in the General Study Centre at Assisi, close to the tomb of St. Francis. It was there that Fasani was ordained to the priesthood in 1705. He was a friend of another Conventual friar, Antonio Lucci; he and Lucci were both ordained as priests together. Fasani stayed in Assisi, completing his theological studies there in 1707.

From 1707 until his death in 1742, Fasani resided in his hometown of Lucera, and endeared himself to the faithful of that town as well as Daunia and Molise. In 1709, he received the degree of Doctor of Theology and, from that time on, Fasani became known to all as "Padre Maestro" ('Father Master'), a title which is still attributed to him today in Lucera. Fasani also fulfilled many duties in the Franciscan Order, being a respected teacher of scholastic philosophy, and was entrusted with the position of Master of novices and the junior professed friars. He was later appointed to serve as the guardian of the community of friars and the pastor of the town. He came to be elected Minister Provincial of his province in the Order.

As a worthy ministry of "the one who uninterruptedly exercises his priestly mission for us in the Liturgy through the Spirit" (PO, 5), Fasani dedicated himself with zeal-especially the administration of the sacrament of Penance and the celebration of the Holy Eucharist. "He heard the confession of every type of person," asserted a witness, "with the greatest patience and kindness on his face". He was charitable and welcoming to all, giving as his reason the hope of being able one day to say to the Lord: "I was indulgent, I don't deny it; but it was You who taught me to be so."

Fasani was known for having a deep life of prayer and was considered to be a mystic, becoming greatly in demand as a confessor and preacher. He constantly preached popular parish missions, gave retreats and led Lenten devotions and novenas - either in his own town or wherever he was requested. It was reported by his contemporaries that he would levitate while at prayer. At the same time, he was a steadfast friend of the poor, constantly seeking out the financial support necessary for efforts to meet their needs.

Fasani died in Lucera and was buried in the parish church there. Upon the news of his death, children could be heard running through the streets shouting, "The saint is dead! The saint is dead!"

== Veneration ==
The proceedings to open the cause for his canonization began several years after his death. Testimony to his holy life was given by many people of region. Among them was his old friend, Lucci, who by then was a bishop in the region. Progress did not take place, however, until the 20th century, when he was beatified in 1951, and subsequently canonized in 1986. His feast day is celebrated by the Franciscan Order on 29 November.
