= Paolo Pecci =

Italian Roman Catholic bishop (1630–1694)

Most Reverend Paolo Pecci
- Bishop of Massa Marittima
- Church: Catholic Church
- Diocese: Diocese of Massa Marittima
- In office: 1679–1694
- Predecessor: Niccolò Della Ciaia
- Successor: Pietro Luigi Malaspina

Orders
- Ordination: 3 May 1679
- Consecration: 10 Dec 1679 by Antonio Bichi

Personal details
- Born: 18 Aug 1630 Siena, Italy
- Died: Oct 1694 (age 64)

Paolo Pecci (1630–1694) was a Roman Catholic prelate who served as Bishop of Massa Marittima (1679–1694).

== Biography ==
Paolo Pecci was born on 18 Aug 1630 in Siena, Italy and ordained a priest on 3 May 1679. On 27 Nov 1679, he was appointed during the papacy of Pope Innocent XI as Bishop of Massa Marittima. On 10 Dec 1679, he was consecrated bishop by Antonio Bichi, Bishop of Osimo, with Giacomo de Angelis, Archbishop Emeritus of Urbino, and Marcantonio Zollio, Bishop of Crema, serving as co-consecrators. He served as Bishop of Massa Marittima until his death in Oct 1694.

== External links and additional sources ==
- Cheney, David M. "Diocese of Massa Marittima-Piombino". Catholic-Hierarchy.org. (for Chronology of Bishops) ^{[self-published]}
- Chow, Gabriel. "Diocese of Massa Marittima-Piombino (Italy)". GCatholic.org. (for Chronology of Bishops) ^{[self-published]}

Catholic Church titles
Preceded by Niccolò Della Ciaia	Bishop of Massa Marittima; 1679–1694	Succeeded by Pietro Luigi Malaspina
