= Francesco Antonio Leopardi =

Italian Roman Catholic prelate

Most Reverend Francesco Antonio Leopardi
- Bishop of Tricarico
- Church: Catholic Church
- Diocese: Diocese of Tricarico
- Predecessor: Fulvio Crivelli
- Successor: Luca Trapani
- Previous post: Bishop of Marsico Nuovo (1683–1685)

Orders
- Ordination: 14 March 1671
- Consecration: 3 October 1683 by Alessandro Crescenzi (cardinal)

Personal details
- Born: 21 January 1635 Bonihabitaculi, Italy
- Died: 5 February 1717 (age 82) Tricarico, Italy

Francesco Antonio Leopardi (1635–1717) was a Roman Catholic prelate who served as Bishop of Tricarico (1685–1717) and Bishop of Marsico Nuovo (1683–1685).

== Biography ==
Francesco Antonio Leopardi was born in 1635 in Buonabitacolo, Italy and ordained a priest on 14 March 1671. On 27 September 1683, he was appointed during the papacy of Pope Innocent XI as Bishop of Marsico Nuovo. On 3 October 1683, he was consecrated bishop by Alessandro Crescenzi, Cardinal-Priest of Santa Prisca. On 1 October 1685, he was appointed during the papacy of Pope Innocent XI as Bishop of Tricarico. He served as Bishop of Tricarico until his death on 5 February 1717.

== External links and additional sources ==
- Cheney, David M. "Diocese of Marsico Nuovo". Catholic-Hierarchy.org. (for Chronology of Bishops) (for Chronology of Bishops) ^{[self-published]}
- Chow, Gabriel. "Diocese of Marsico Nuovo (Italy)". GCatholic.org. (for Chronology of Bishops) ^{[self-published]}
- Cheney, David M. "Diocese of Tricarico". Catholic-Hierarchy.org. (for Chronology of Bishops) ^{[self-published]}
- Chow, Gabriel. "Diocese of Tricarico (Italy)". GCatholic.org. (for Chronology of Bishops) ^{[self-published]}

Catholic Church titles
| Preceded by Giovanni Gambacorta | Bishop of Marsico Nuovo; 1683–1685 | Succeeded by Domenico Lucchetti |
| Preceded by Fulvio Crivelli | Bishop of Tricarico; 1685–1717 | Succeeded by Luca Trapani |
