= Simon Gaudenti =

Most Reverend Simon Gaudenti
- Bishop of Ossero
- Church: Catholic Church
- Diocese: Diocese of Ossero
- In office: 1673–1719
- Predecessor: Matthieu Scrivanelli
- Successor: Nicolò Drasich

Orders
- Ordination: 19 September 1654
- Consecration: 12 March 1673 by Gasparo Carpegna

Personal details
- Born: 4 November 1629 Spalaten
- Died: September 1719 (age 89) Osor, Croatia

Simon Gaudenti (4 November 1629 – September, 1719) was a Roman Catholic prelate who served as Bishop of Ossero (1673–1719).

== Biography ==
Simon Gaudenti was born in Spalaten on 4 November 1629 and ordained a priest on 19 September 1654. On 30 January 1673, he was appointed during the papacy of Pope Clement X as Bishop of Ossero. On 12 March 1673, he was consecrated bishop by Gasparo Carpegna, Cardinal-Priest of San Silvestro in Capite, with Alessandro Crescenzi (cardinal), Titular Patriarch of Alexandria, and Hyacinthe Libelli, Archbishop of Avignon, serving as co-consecrators. He served as Bishop of Ossero until his death in September 1719.

Catholic Church titles
Preceded by Matthieu Scrivanelli	Bishop of Ossero; 1673–1719	Succeeded by Nicolò Drasich
