= Giuseppe Cei (bishop) =

Italian Roman Catholic bishop (1640–1704)

Most Reverend Giuseppe Cei
- Bishop of Cortona
- Church: Catholic Church
- Diocese: Cortona
- In office: 1695–1704
- Predecessor: Pietro Luigi Malaspina
- Successor: Sebastiano Zucchetti

Orders
- Consecration: 30 November 1695 by Bandino Panciatici

Personal details
- Born: 1640 Livorno, Italy
- Died: 6 March 1704 (aged 63–64) Cortona, Italy

Giuseppe Cei CO (1640–1704) was an Italian Roman Catholic prelate who served as Bishop of Cortona (1695–1704).

== Biography ==
Giuseppe Cei was born in Livorno, Italy, in 1640 and ordained a priest in the Congregation of the Oratory of Saint Philip Neri. On 28 November 1695, he was appointed during the papacy of Pope Innocent XII as Bishop of Cortona. On 30 November 1695, he was consecrated bishop by Bandino Panciatici, Cardinal-Priest of San Pancrazio with Michelangelo Mattei, Titular Patriarch of Antioch, and Sperello Sperelli, Bishop of Terni, serving as co-consecrators. He served as Bishop of Cortona until his death on 6 March 1704.

== External links and additional sources ==
- Cheney, David M. "Diocese of Cortona". Catholic-Hierarchy.org. (for Chronology of Bishops) ^{[self-published]}
- Chow, Gabriel. "Diocese of Cortona (Italy)". GCatholic.org. (for Chronology of Bishops) ^{[self-published]}

Catholic Church titles
Preceded by Pietro Luigi Malaspina	Bishop of Cortona; 1695–1704	Succeeded by Sebastiano Zucchetti
