= Turpino Zaccagna =

Italian painter

Turpino Zaccagna (active c. 1537) was an Italian painter of the Renaissance period, born in Florence or Cortona (according to Lanzi). He was a pupil of Luca Signorelli, and painted a Burial and Ascension of the Virgin in the choir of the Cortona Cathedral.
