= Pietro Luigi Malaspina =

Italian Roman Catholic prelate

Most Reverend Pietro Luigi Malaspina
- Bishop of Massa Marittima
- Church: Catholic Church
- Diocese: Diocese of Massa Marittima
- In office: 1695–1705
- Predecessor: Paolo Pecci
- Successor: Ascanio Silvestri
- Previous post: Bishop of Cortona (1684–1695)

Orders
- Consecration: 8 October 1684 by Alessandro Crescenzi (cardinal)

Personal details
- Born: 1637 Florence, Italy
- Died: December 1705 (aged 67–68) Massa Marittima, Italy

Pietro Luigi Malaspina, C.R. (1637 – December, 1705) was a Roman Catholic prelate who served as Bishop of Massa Marittima (1695–1705) and Bishop of Cortona (1684–1695).

== Biography ==
Pietro Luigi Malaspina was born in Florence, Italy in 1637 and ordained a priest in the Congregation of Clerics Regular of the Divine Providence. On 2 October 1684, he was appointed during the papacy of Pope Innocent XI as Bishop of Cortona. On 8 October 1684, he was consecrated bishop by Alessandro Crescenzi (cardinal), Cardinal-Priest of Santa Prisca, with Pier Antonio Capobianco, Bishop Emeritus of Lacedonia, and Benedetto Bartolo, Bishop of Belcastro, serving as co-consecrators. On 2 May 1695, he was appointed during the papacy of Pope Innocent XII as Bishop of Massa Marittima. He served as Bishop of Massa Marittima until his death in December 1705.

== External links and additional sources ==
- Cheney, David M. "Diocese of Cortona". Catholic-Hierarchy.org. (for Chronology of Bishops) ^{[self-published]}
- Chow, Gabriel. "Diocese of Cortona (Italy)". GCatholic.org. (for Chronology of Bishops) ^{[self-published]}
- Cheney, David M. "Diocese of Massa Marittima-Piombino". Catholic-Hierarchy.org. (for Chronology of Bishops) ^{[self-published]}
- Chow, Gabriel. "Diocese of Massa Marittima-Piombino (Italy)". GCatholic.org. (for Chronology of Bishops) ^{[self-published]}

Catholic Church titles
Preceded by Nicola Oliva	Bishop of Cortona; 1684–1695	Succeeded by Giuseppe Cei (bishop)
Preceded by Paolo Pecci	Bishop of Massa Marittima; 1695–1705	Succeeded by Ascanio Silvestri
