= Ascanio Parisi =

Italian Roman Catholic prelate (died 1614)

Most Reverend Ascanio Parisi
- Church: Catholic Church
- Diocese: Diocese of Marsico Nuovo
- In office: 1600–1614
- Predecessor: Antonio Fera
- Successor: Timoteo Castelli
- Previous post: Titular Bishop of Hebron (1599–1600)

Orders
- Consecration: 29 August 1599 by Domenico Pinelli

Personal details
- Died: 23 April 1614 Marsico Nuovo, Italy

Ascanio Parisi (died 23 April 1614) was a Roman Catholic prelate who served as Bishop of Marsico Nuovo (1600–1614) and Titular Bishop of Hebron (1599–1600).

== Biography ==
On 2 August 1599, Ascanio Parisi was appointed Coadjutor Bishop of Marsico Nuovo and Titular Bishop of Hebron. by Pope Clement VIII. On 29 August 1599, he was consecrated bishop by Domenico Pinelli, Cardinal-Priest of San Crisogono, with Leonard Abel, Titular Bishop of Sidon, and Scipione Spina, Bishop of Lecce, serving as co-consecrators. On 24 April 1600, he succeeded to the Bishopric of Marsico Nuovo, where he served until his death on 23 April 1614.

== External links and additional sources ==
- Cheney, David M. "Diocese of Marsico Nuovo". Catholic-Hierarchy.org. (for Chronology of Bishops) (for Chronology of Bishops) ^{[self-published]}
- Chow, Gabriel. "Diocese of Marsico Nuovo (Italy)". GCatholic.org. (for Chronology of Bishops) (for Chronology of Bishops) ^{[self-published]}
- Cheney, David M. "Hebron (Titular See)". Catholic-Hierarchy.org. (for Chronology of Bishops) (for Chronology of Bishops) ^{[self-published]}
- Chow, Gabriel. "Titular Episcopal See of Hebron". GCatholic.org. (for Chronology of Bishops) (for Chronology of Bishops) ^{[self-published]}

Catholic Church titles
Preceded by Giacomo Rovello	Titular Bishop of Hebron; 1599–1600	Succeeded by Friedrich Förner
Preceded by Antonio Fera	Bishop of Marsico Nuovo; 1600–1614	Succeeded by Timoteo Castelli
