= Domenico Lucchetti =

Most Reverend Domenico Lucchetti
- Bishop of Marsico Nuovo
- Church: Catholic Church
- Diocese: Diocese of Marsico Nuovo
- In office: 1686–1707
- Predecessor: Francesco Antonio Leopardi
- Successor: Donato Ansani

Orders
- Ordination: 21 September 1646

Personal details
- Born: 12 October 1623 Aliano, Italy
- Died: February 1707 (age 83) Marsico Nuovo, Italy

Domenico Lucchetti (12 October 1623 – February 1707) was a Roman Catholic prelate who served as Bishop of Marsico Nuovo (1686–1707).

Lucchetti was born in Aliano, Italy on 12 October 1623 and ordained a priest on 21 September 1646. On 1 April 1686, he was appointed Bishop of Marsico Nuovo by Pope Innocent XI. He served as Bishop of Marsico Nuovo until his death in Feb 1707.

== External links and additional sources ==
- Cheney, David M. "Diocese of Marsico Nuovo". Catholic-Hierarchy.org. (for Chronology of Bishops) (for Chronology of Bishops) ^{[self-published]}
- Chow, Gabriel. "Diocese of Marsico Nuovo (Italy)". GCatholic.org. (for Chronology of Bishops) ^{[self-published]}

Catholic Church titles
Preceded by Francesco Antonio Leopardi	Bishop of Marsico Nuovo; 1686–1707	Succeeded by Donato Ansani
