= Roman Catholic Diocese of Marsico Nuovo =

Roman Catholic ecclesiastical territory in Basilicata, southern Italy

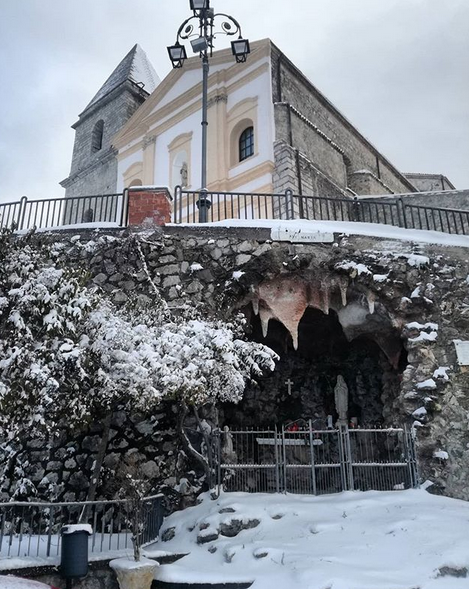

The diocese of Marsico Nuovo was a Roman Catholic ecclesiastical territory in Basilicata, southern Italy, which existed until 1818. It was a suffragan of the archbishops of Salerno. In 1818, Marsico Nuovo was united aeque principaliter with the diocese of Potenza, to form the diocese of Marsico Nuovo and Potenza.

== History ==
Marsico Nuovo is a city of the province of Potenza in Southern Italy. Its origin is obscure, but the ancient Grumentum was destroyed by the Saracens.

It is said that a Saint Laberius or Saverius first preached the Gospel there. In the story of Laberius appears the name of a Bishop Sempronius Atto; both are inventions. An attested bishop of Grumentum is Tullianus (c. 558-560). In a letter of July 599, Pope Gregory I orders Romanus, his Defensor Siciliae, to intervene in a squabble between two men "in parochia Grumentina."

=== Transfer of episcopal residence ===
The town of Marsico Nuovo grew in importance, and became under the Normans the seat of a county. It became an episcopal see, dioecesis Marsicensis, when a bishop of Grumentum established his residence there, retaining, however, his former title. A number of bishops had formerly been assigned to Marsico Nuovo in the Lombard period who actually belonged to the diocese of the Marsi; the confusion persists even beyond that period.

Marsico Nuovo appears as a diocese in a papal document of 24 March 1058, in which Pope Stephen IX confirmed the diocese of Salerno in its archiepiscopal and metropolitan status. He listed the suffragan dioceses assigned to Salerno, including Marsico.

In 1744, the city of Marsico Nuovo had a population of c. 4,000 persons. In addition to the cathedral, there were four parish churches, two religious houses of men, and one of women. The monastery of S. Stephen Protomartyr had been founded inside the city; the monastery of S. Peter Tramutulae had been founded in 1150 by the monk Giovanni from the monastery of Cava (who later became Bishop of Marsico); and the monastery of S. Thomas of Canterbury at Raya had been founded by Count William of the Marsi in 1179.

=== Post-Napoleonic consolidation ===
On 27 June 1818, the diocese of Potenza was united with the Diocese of Marsico Nuovo aeque principaliter, to form Diocese of Potenza e Marsico Nuovo. Potenza was made a suffragan of the archdiocese of Acerenza, along with Anglona e Tursi, Tricarico, and Venosa.

=== Post-Vatican-II changes ===
Following the Second Vatican Council, and in accordance with the norms laid out in the council's decree, Christus Dominus chapter 40, Pope Paul VI ordered a reorganization of the ecclesiastical provinces in southern Italy. The decree "Eo quod spirituales" of 12 September 1976 created a new episcopal conference in the region called "Basilicata", to which were assigned all of the dioceses that belonged to the ecclesiastical province of Potenza, including Materana and Mons Pelusii; they had formerly belonged to the episcopal conference of "Apulia". Pope Paul VI ordered consultations among the members of the Congregation of Bishops in the Vatican Curia, the Italian Bishops Conference, and the various dioceses concerned. After twenty years, problems and objections were still apparent.

On 18 February 1984, the Vatican and the Italian State signed a new and revised concordat. Based on the revisions, a set of Normae was issued on 15 November 1984, which was accompanied in the next year, on 3 June 1985, by enabling legislation. According to the agreement, the practice of having one bishop govern two separate dioceses at the same time, aeque personaliter, was abolished. The Vatican continued consultations which had begun under Pope John XXIII for the merging of small dioceses, especially those with personnel and financial problems, into one combined diocese.

On 30 September 1986, Pope John Paul II ordered that the dioceses of Potenza, Marsico Nuovo, and Muro Lucano be merged into one diocese with one bishop, with the Latin title Archidioecesis Potentina-Murana-Marsicensis. The seat of the diocese was to be in Potenza, and the cathedral of Potenza was to serve as the cathedral of the merged diocese. The cathedrals in Marsico Nuovo and Muro Lucano were to become co-cathedrals, and their cathedral Chapters were each to be a Capitulum Concathedralis. There was to be only one diocesan Tribunal, in Potenza, and likewise one seminary, one College of Consultors, and one Priests' Council. The territory of the new diocese was to include the territory of the suppressed dioceses of Marsico Nuovo and Muro Lucano.

== Bishops of Marsico Nuovo ==
=== to 1450 ===
[Grimaldus]
...

- Gisulf (attested 1089)
- Giovanni, O.S.B. (attested 1095–1098)

...

- Leo (attested 1123)
- Enrico (attested 1130)

...

- Giovanni (attested 1144–1155)
- Giovanni (attested 1163–1166)

...

- Joannes (attested 1189–c. 1200)
- Anselm (attested 1210)
- Rogerius (attested 1222)
- Odericus (Oderisius) (1234–1242)
- Joannes
- Reginaldus de Leontini, O.P. ( –1274)
- Rainaldus de Piperno, O.P. (1275)
- Giovanni de Vetere (attested 1287)
- Matthaeus
- Giovanni Acuto
- Rogerius
- Petrus de Lupico, O.P. (1328– ? )
- Rogerius
- Bartholomaeus (1349–
- Pietro Corsario (1375–1378)
- Thomas Sferrato, O.Min. (1378–1384 deposed) Roman Obedience
- Jacobus de Padula (1384– ) Avignon Obediewnce
- Andreas ( ? –1399) Roman Obedience
- Marcus (1399–1400 deposed) Avignon Obedience
- Petrus (1400)
- Nardellus (Leonardus) da Gaeta, O.Min (1400–1440)
- Carletus (1440-1453)

=== 1450 to 1818 ===
- Leonardo da Gaeta (1453–1456)
- Petrus de Diano (1456–1458)
- Andreas (1458-1460)
- Samson de Coyano (1460–1478)
- Giovanni Antonio Pitito, O.F.M. Conv. (25 Jul 1478 – 1483 Died)
- Nicola Angelo de Abbatissa (1483–1484 Died)
- Antonio de'Medici, O.F.M. (1484–1485 Died)
- Fabrizio Guarna (1485–1494 Died)
- Ottaviano Caracciolo (19 Mar 1494 – 1535 Died)
- Vincenzo Boccaferro, O.S.B. (1536–1537)
- Angelo Archilegi (1537–1541)
- Marzio Marzi Medici (1541–1574)
- Angelo Marzi Medici (15 Oct 1574 – 1582 Died)
- Jean Louis Pallavicino di Ceva (1583)
- Antonio Fera, O.F.M. Conv. (9 Apr 1584 – 24 Apr 1600 Died)
- Ascanio Parisi (24 Apr 1600 Succeeded – 1614)
- Timoteo Castelli, O.P. (21 Jul 1614 – 23 Nov 1639 Died)
- Giuseppe Ciantes, O.P. (5 Mar 1640 – Jan 1656 Resigned)
- Angelo Pineri (26 Jun 1656 – 22 Jul 1671 Died)
- Giovanni Battista Falvo (16 Nov 1671 – 1 Jan 1676 Died)
- Giovanni Gambacorta, C.R. (23 Mar 1676 – 25 May 1683 Died)
- Francesco Antonio Leopardi (27 Sep 1683 – 1 Oct 1685 Appointed, Bishop of Tricarico)
- Domenico Lucchetti (1 Apr 1686 – Feb 1707 Died)
- Donato Ansani (19 May 1710 – 9 Jul 1732 Died)
- Alessandro Puoti (1 Oct 1732 – 3 Aug 1744 Died)
- Diego Andrea Tomacelli (7 Sep 1744 – 24 Aug 1766 Died)
- Andrea Tortora (1 Dec 1766 – 10 May 1771 Died)
- Carlo Nicodemi (29 Jul 1771 – 26 Mar 1792 Confirmed, Bishop of Sant'Angelo dei Lombardi e Bisaccia)
- Bernardo Maria della Torre (26 Mar 1792 Confirmed – 18 Dec 1797 Confirmed, Bishop of Lettere-Gragnano))
- Paolo Garzillo (18 Dec 1797 Confirmed – 2 Oct 1818 Confirmed, Bishop of Bovino)

27 June 1818: United with the Diocese of Potenza to form the Diocese of Potenza e Marsico Nuovo

== See also ==
- Roman Catholic Archdiocese of Sorrento-Castellammare di Stabia

== Books ==
- Eubel, Conradus, ed. (1913). Hierarchia catholica (in Latin). Vol. Tomus 1 (second ed.). Münster: Libreria Regensbergiana.
- Eubel, Conradus, ed. (1914). Hierarchia catholica (in Latin). Vol. Tomus 2 (second ed.). Münster: Libreria Regensbergiana.
- Eubel, Conradus; Gulik, Guilelmus (1923). Hierarchia catholica (in Latin). Vol. 3 (second ed.). Münster: Libreria Regensbergiana.
- Gams, Pius Bonifatius (1873). Series episcoporum Ecclesiae catholicae: quotquot innotuerunt a beato Petro apostolo (in Latin). Ratisbon: Typis et Sumptibus Georgii Josephi Manz.
- Gauchat, Patritius (Patrice) (1935). Hierarchia catholica (in Latin). Vol. IV (1592-1667). Münster: Libraria Regensbergiana.
- Ritzler, Remigius; Sefrin, Pirminus (1952). Hierarchia catholica medii et recentis aevi (in Latin). Vol. V (1667-1730). Patavii: Messagero di S. Antonio.
- Ritzler, Remigius; Sefrin, Pirminus (1958). Hierarchia catholica medii et recentis aevi (in Latin). Vol. VI (1730-1799). Patavii: Messagero di S. Antonio.

=== Studies ===
- Cappelletti, Giuseppe (1870). Le chiese d'Italia: dalla loro origine sino ai nostri giorni (in Italian). Vol. vigesimo (20). Venezia: G. Antonelli. pp. 379–400.
- Colangelo, G.A. (1978). La diocesi di Marsico nei secoli XVI-XVIII. (in Italian). Roma 1978.
- D'Avino, Vincenzio (1848). Cenni storici sulle chiese arcivescovili, vescovili, e prelatizie (nullius) del regno delle due Sicilie (in Italian). Naples: dalle stampe di Ranucci. pp. 541–545.
- Kamp, Norbert (1975). Kirche und Monarchie im staufischen Königreich Sizilien. I. Prosopographische Grundlegung: 2. Apulien und Kalabrien. München: Wilhelm Fink Verlag. (in German) pp. 760–763.
- Kehr, Paul Fridolin (1935). Italia pontificia. Vol. VIII: Regnum Normannorum — Campania. Berlin: Weidmann. (in Latin) pp. 373–376.
- Lanzoni, Francesco (1927). Le diocesi d'Italia dalle origini al principio del secolo VII (an. 604). (in Italian) Faenza: F. Lega, pp. 324–325.
- Mattei-Cerasoli, Leone (1919). Da archivii e biblioteche: Di alcuni vescovi poco noti. (in Italian). In: Archivio storico per le province Neapolitane (Napoli: Luigi Lubrano). pp. 310–335, at 313-315.
- Racioppi, Giacomo (1881). Fonti della storia basilicatese al medio evo: l'agiografia di San Laverio del MCLXII. Roma: Tipog. di G. Barbèra, 1881
- Servanzi-Collio, Severino (1867). Serie dei vescovi delle chiese cattedrali di Potenza e di Marsico Nuovo nella Basilicata (in Italian) Roma: Tipografia delle belle arti.
- Torelli, Felice (1848). La chiave del Concordato dell'anno 1818 e degli atti emanati posteriormente al medesimo. (in Italian) Volume 1, second edition Naples: Stamperia del Fibreno, 1848.
- Ughelli, Ferdinando; Coleti, NIccolo (1720). Italia sacra sive De episcopis Italiæ, et insularum adjacentium (in Latin). Vol. Tomus sextus (6). Venice: apud Sebastianum Coleti. pp. 485–524.
