= Diocese of Cortona =

Former Latin Catholic diocese in Italy

Coordinates: 43.2765°N 11.9923°E

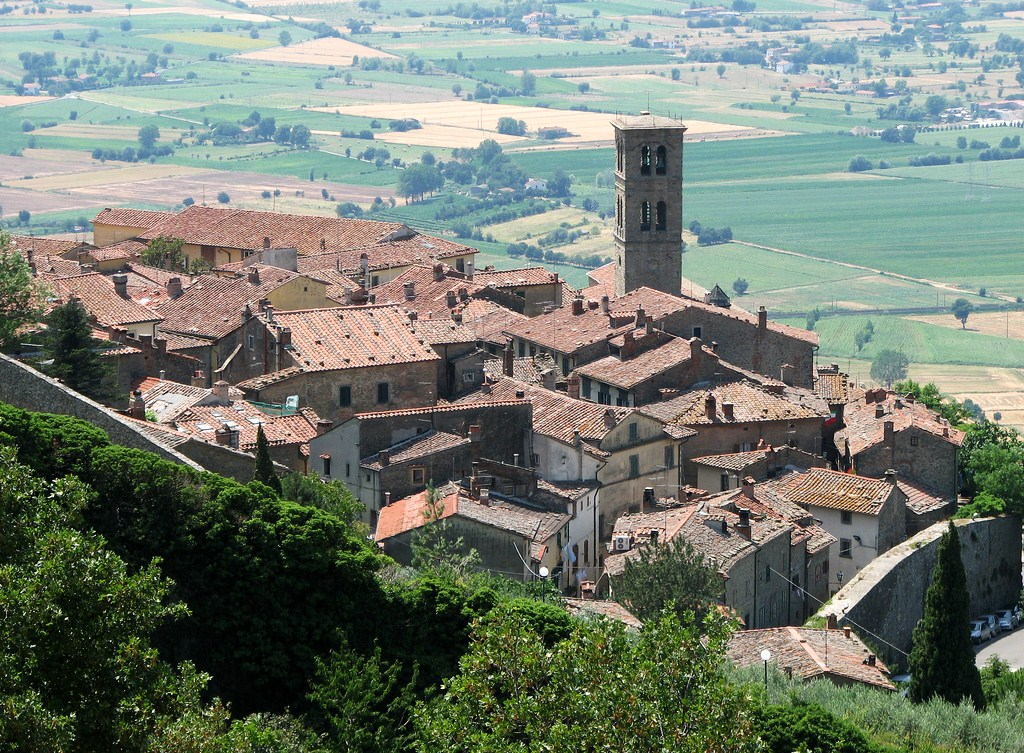
Cathedral of Cortona

The Diocese of Cortona was a Catholic Churchecclesiastical territory in central Italy, which existed from 1325 to 1986. It was immediately subject to the Holy See.

In 1986 the diocese of Cortona was united with the Diocese of Sansepolcro and the Diocese of Arezzo to form the diocese of Arezzo-Cortona-Sansepolcro. It became a suffragan (subordinate) diocese of the Metropolitan archdiocese of Florence.

== History ==
Ancient Cortona was one of the twelve cities of Etruria. In the 6th century it was destroyed by the Lombards but was soon rebuilt. From that time until 1325 the city and its territory were assigned ecclesiastically to the Diocese of Arezzo.

At the beginning of the 14th century, however, Arezzo and Cortona were still involved in the struggles between the Guelfs and the Ghibellines. Arezzo was Ghibelline in allegiance, supporting the emperor; Cortona, which had been conquered by Arezzo in 1258, was Guelf, and supported the papal states. In Arezzo, two aristocratic factions contended for domination, the Verdi and the Secchi, and when the latter gained control they had their leader, Guido Tarlati of the castle of Petramala, elected bishop of Arezzo. He embarked on an activist program, building a wall around the city, and creating a new silver and copper currency. His program also included military conquest: Lusignano, Chiusi, Fronzoli, Castel Focognano, Rondina, Bucine, Caprese, Lacerina, and Monte Sansovino. This expansionist activity greatly alarmed both the Florentines and Pope John XXII, who, though safely settled in Avignon, feared for the loss of church territories and the threat to the papal states. He determined to take action against Bishop Guido, who was paying no attention to his angry protests.

In the year 1325, at the request of Guglielmo Casali, Captain (Gonfaloniere) of the People of Cortona, Pope John XXII raised Cortona to episcopal rank, as a reward for the fidelity of its Guelph populace. A month later, on 20 July 1325, the Bishop of Arezzo, Guido Tarlati de Petramala, was excommunicated.

In the papal bull, "Vigilis speculatoris", dated 19 June 1325, Pope John XXII established the new diocese of Cortona by detaching its territory from the diocese of Arezzo. He created the church of S. Vincenzo, which had belonged to the monastery of Ss. Lucilla and Flora, the new cathedral. In a bull of 29 June 1325, the Pope designated Rinaldo di Guido, parish priest of S. Andrea, the new Provost of the cathedral. In another bull, dated 30 June 1325, Pope John established the cathedral Chapter, composed of two dignities (Provost and Archdeacon) and eight Canons.

The current Cathedral of Cortona became the diocesan seat only in 1507.

The diocesan seminary was founded by Bishop Francesco Perignani (1572–1577) in 1573.

=== Diocesan synods ===
A diocesan synod was an irregularly held, but important, meeting of the bishop of a diocese and his clergy. Its purpose was (1) to proclaim generally the various decrees already issued by the bishop; (2) to discuss and ratify measures on which the bishop chose to consult with his clergy; (3) to publish statutes and decrees of the diocesan synod, of the provincial synod, and of the Holy See.

Bishop Giovanni Alberti (1585–1596) presided over a diocesan synod in 1588.

Bishop Cosmo Minerbetto conducted a diocesan synod in Cortona in 1624. A diocesan synod was held in Cortona in August 1634 by Bishop Lorenzo della Robbia.

=== Suppression of the diocese ===
On 18 February 1984, the Vatican and the Italian State signed a new and revised concordat. Based on the revisions, a set of Normae was issued on 15 November 1984, which was accompanied in the next year, on 3 June 1985, by enabling legislation. According to the agreement, the practice of having one bishop govern two separate dioceses at the same time, aeque personaliter, was abolished. Instead, the Vatican continued consultations which had begun under Pope John XXIII for the merging of small dioceses, especially those with personnel and financial problems, into one combined diocese. In Tuscany, this particularly affected three dioceses: Arezzo, Cortona, and Borgo San Sepolcro (Biturgensis).

On 30 September 1986, Pope John Paul II ordered that the dioceses of Arezzo, Cortona, and San Sepolcro be merged into one diocese with one bishop, with the Latin title Dioecesis Arretina-Cortonensis-Biturgensis. The seat of the diocese was to be in Arezzo, and the cathedral of Arezzo was to serve as the cathedral of the merged diocese. The cathedrals in Cortona and San Sepolcro were to become co-cathedrals, and their cathedral Chapters were to be a Capitulum Concathedralis. There was to be only one diocesan Tribunal, in Arezzo, and likewise one seminary, one College of Consultors, and one Priests' Council. The territory of the new diocese was to include the territory of the former dioceses of Cortona and Borgo San Sepolcro.

== Bishops ==
=== from 1325 to 1603 ===
- Rainerius Ubertini (1325–1348)
- Gregorio de Fasciani (1348–1364)
- Benedetto Vallati, O.P. (1364– ? )
- Giuliano de Chinibaldi, O.P. (attested 1382)
- Lorenzo Coppi (1388– ? ) Roman Obedience
- Ubaldino Bonamici (1391–1393)
- Bartolomeo da Troia, O.Min (1393–1404)
- Henochus (Enoc) de Cioncolari, O.E.S.A. (1404– ? )
- Matteo Testi (1426–1439 deposed)
- Bartolomeo Lopaci, O.P. (1439–1449)
- Matteo Testi (1449–1455 resigned)
- Mariano Salvini, O.S.M. (1455–1477)
- Cristoforo Bordini (1477–1502)
- Rainerio Guicciardini (1502–1504)

Cardinal Francesco Soderini (1504–1505 Resigned) Administrator

- Guglielmo Copponi (1505–1515)

Cardinal Francesco Soderini (1515–1516 Resigned)Administrator

- Giovanni Sernini (1516–1521)
- Silvio Passerini (1521–1529 Died)
- Leonardo Bonafide, O.S.B. (1529–1538 Resigned)
- Giovambattista Ricasoli (1538–1560 Appointed, Bishop of Pistoia)
- Matteo Concini (1560–1562 Resigned)
- Girolamo Gaddi (1562–1572 Died)
- Francesco Perignani (1572–1577 Died)
- Costantino Piccioni, O.S.A. (1577–1585 Died)
- Giovanni Alberti (bishop) (1585–1596 Died)
- Cosimo de Angelis (1597–1603 Died)

=== from 1603 to 1986 ===
- Filippo Bardi (dei Verni) (1603–1622 Died)
- Cosmas Minerbetti (1622–1628 Died)
- Lorenzo della Robbia (1628–1634 Appointed, Bishop of Fiesole)
- Ludovico Serristori (1634–1656 Died)
- Filippo Galilei (1657–1677)
- Nicola Oliva, O.S.A. (1677–1684)
- Pietro Luigi Malaspina, C.R. (1684–1695 Appointed, Bishop of Massa Marittima)
- Giuseppe Cei, C.O. (1695–1704)
- Sebastiano Zucchetti (1705–1714)
- Pietro Giovanni Battista Puccini (1716–1726 Died)
- Luigi Gherardi (1726–1754)
- Giuseppe Ippoliti (1755–1776)
- Gregorio Alessandri (1776–1802)
- Filippo Ganucci (1802–1806)
- Niccolò Laparelli (1807–1821)
- Girolamo Conversini (1824–1826)
- Ugolino Carlini (1829–1847 Died)
- Giuseppe Antonio Giacomo Borghi, O.F.M. Cap. (1849–1851 Died)
- Feliciano (Laurentius Joachim) Barbacci, O.F.M. (1854–1869 Died)
- Giovanni Battista Laparelli Pitti (1872–1896 Died)
- Guido Corbelli, O.F.M. (1896–1901 Resigned)
- Michele Angelo Baldetti (1901–1923 Resigned)
- Riccardo Carlesi (1923–1932 Died)
- Giuseppe Franciolini (1932–1978 Retired)
- Telesforo Giovanni Cioli, O. Carm. (1978–1983 Retired)
- Giovanni D'Ascenzi (1983–1986 Appointed, Bishop of Arezzo-Cortona-Sansepolcro)

== See also ==
- Roman Catholic Diocese of Arezzo-Cortona-Sansepolcro
- Roman Catholic Diocese of Sansepolcro
- List of Catholic dioceses in Italy

== Books ==
- Gams, Pius Bonifatius (1873). Series episcoporum Ecclesiae catholicae: quotquot innotuerunt a beato Petro apostolo. Ratisbon: Typis et Sumptibus Georgii Josephi Manz. p. 743. (Use with caution; obsolete)
- Eubel, Conradus, ed. (1913). Hierarchia catholica (in Latin). Vol. Tomus 1 (second ed.). Münster: Libreria Regensbergiana.
- Eubel, Conradus, ed. (1914). Hierarchia catholica (in Latin). Vol. Tomus 2 (second ed.). Münster: Libreria Regensbergiana.
- Gulik Guilelmus (1923). Eubel, Conradus (ed.). Hierarchia catholica (in Latin). Vol. Tomus 3 (second ed.). Münster: Libreria Regensbergiana.
- Gauchat, Patritius (Patrice) (1935). Hierarchia catholica (in Latin). Vol. Tomus IV (1592-1667). Münster: Libraria Regensbergiana.
- Ritzler, Remigius; Sefrin, Pirminus (1952). Hierarchia catholica medii et recentis aevi (in Latin). Vol. Tomus V (1667-1730). Patavii: Messagero di S. Antonio.
- Ritzler, Remigius; Sefrin, Pirminus (1958). Hierarchia catholica medii et recentis aevi. Vol. Tomus VI (1730-1799). Patavii: Messagero di S. Antonio.
- Ritzler, Remigius; Sefrin, Pirminus (1968). Hierarchia Catholica medii et recentioris aevi (in Latin). Vol. VII (1800–1846). Monasterii: Libreria Regensburgiana.
- Remigius Ritzler; Pirminus Sefrin (1978). Hierarchia catholica Medii et recentioris aevi (in Latin). Vol. VIII (1846–1903). Il Messaggero di S. Antonio.
- Pięta, Zenon (2002). Hierarchia catholica medii et recentioris aevi (in Latin). Vol. IX (1903–1922). Padua: Messagero di San Antonio. ISBN 978-88-250-1000-8.

=== Studies ===
- Bullarum diplomatum et privilegiorum sanctorum romanorum pontificum taurinensis (in Latin). Vol. Tomus IV. Turin (Augusta Taurinorum): Seb. Franco et Henrico Dalmazzo editoribus. 1859. pp. 312–315.
- Cappelletti, Giuseppe (1864). Le chiese d'Italia (in Italian). Vol. decimotto (18). Venezia: G. Antonelli. pp. 267–297.
- Guazzesi, Lorenzo (1760). Dell'antico dominio del vescovo di Arezzo in Cortona. Pisa: per Gio. Paolo Giovannelli. p. 69.
- Mancini, Girolamo (1897). Cortona nel medio evo (in Italian). Firenze: G. Carnesecchi.
- Mirri, Giuseppe (1972). I vescovi di Cortona dalla istituzione della diocesi (1325–1971). Cortona 1972. (in Italian)
- Ughelli, Ferdinando; Coleti, Nicolò (1717). Italia sacra: sive De episcopis Italiae et insularum adjacentium, rebusque abiis praeclare gestis... (in Latin). Vol. Tomus primus (secunda ed.). Venice: apud Sebastianum Coleti. pp. 620–632.
