= Cortona Cathedral =

Roman catholic cathedral in Cortona, Italy

Coordinates: 43°16′35″N 11°59′03″E

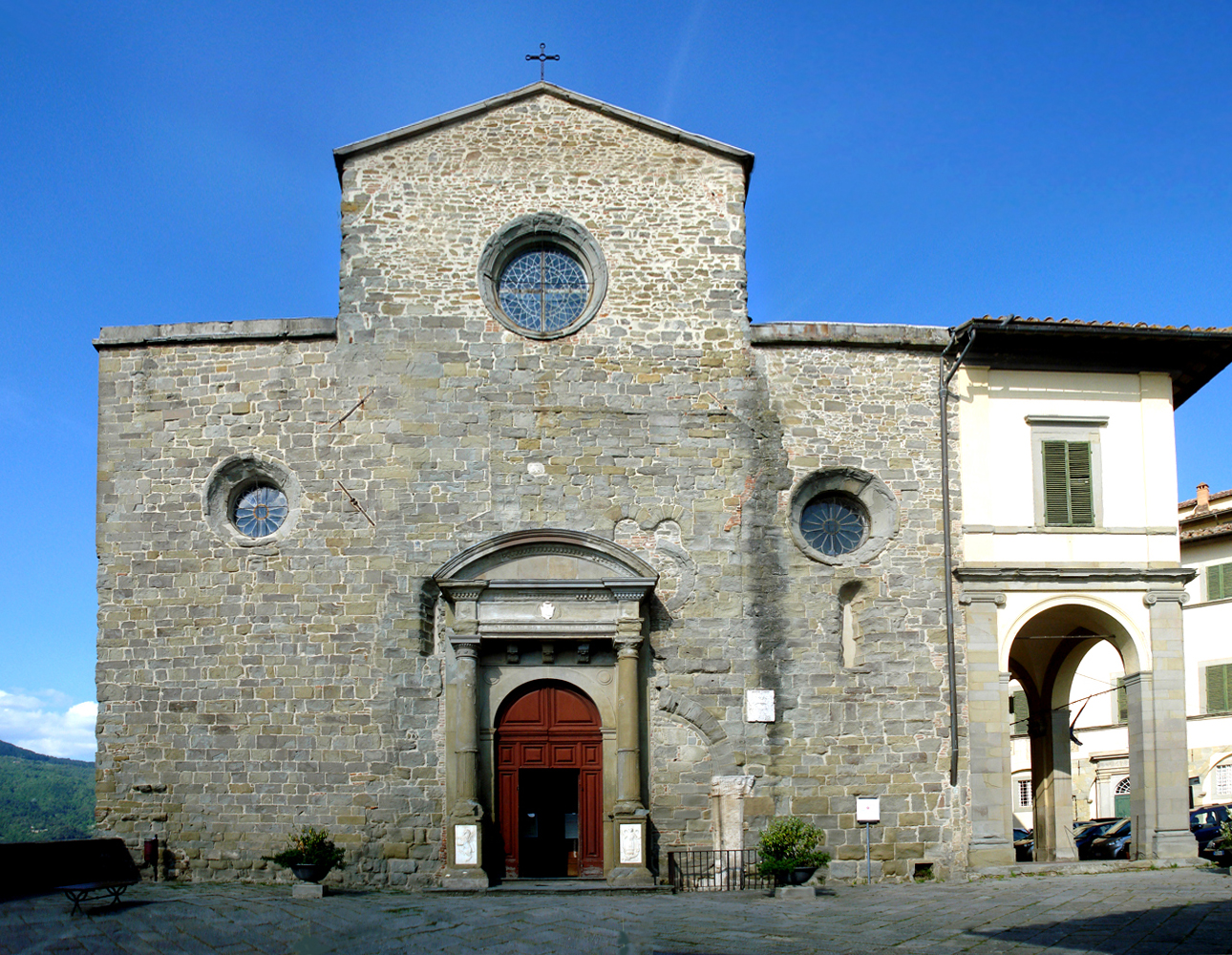
West front of the cathedral

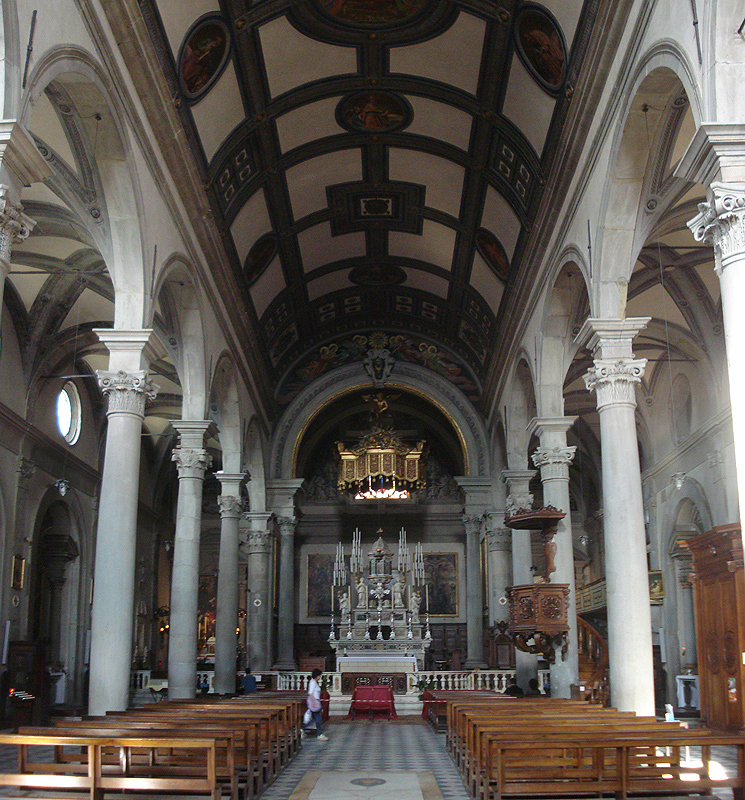
Interior of the cathedral

Cortona Cathedral (Italian: Duomo di Cortona, Concattedrale di Santa Maria Assunta) is a Roman Catholic cathedral in Cortona, Tuscany, central Italy, dedicated to the Assumption of the Virgin Mary. It was the seat of the Bishops of Cortona from 1507 to 1986, and is now a co-cathedral in the present Diocese of Arezzo-Cortona-Sansepolcro.

== History ==
The church was built over the remains of an ancient Roman temple and is mentioned (as a pieve, or plebeian church) in the 11th century. In 1325 the diocese of Cortona was created from the territory of the diocese of Arezzo, but the present cathedral was not chosen at that date as the episcopal seat, although the adjoining building was used as the bishop's residence.

In 1507 Pope Julius II resolved the anomaly and transferred the bishop's seat from the sub-urban church of San Vincenzo. As if in preparation for its new importance, the interior had been refurbished in the late 15th century.

== Description ==
The appearance of the original medieval church is mostly hidden by later additions, such as the 18th century barrel vaulted ceiling in the nave, which was repainted in the late 19th century by the local artist Giovanni Brunacci; in the same period the oval windows, the triumphal arch and the pavement were also added or remade. The oldest elements visible are in the Romanesque façade - a pier with capital, and small columns at the corners, and part of the large arcade.

The church has a central nave and two aisles, divided by columns with Brunelleschi-inspired capitals. The south side has a loggia built in the late 16th century. The bell tower dates from the middle of the same century.

Artworks in the interior include an Adoration of the Shepherds by Pietro da Cortona and assistants (c. 1663), a Consecration of the Church of the Holy Saviour by Andrea Commodi (1607, brought here in the late 18th century) and a Descent of the Holy Spirit by Tommaso Bernabei (1528-1529). The town's Diocesan Museum houses works formerly in the cathedral, including Pietro Lorenzetti's Maestà (before 1320), and a tapestry and a reliquary from the period of the Renaissance.

== Sources ==
- Plan and photographs (in Italian)
- Cortonaweb: Cattedrale (in Italian)
