= Camillo Massimo =

17th-century Italian cardinal

His Eminence Camillo Massimi
- Cardinal-Priest of Sant'Anastasia
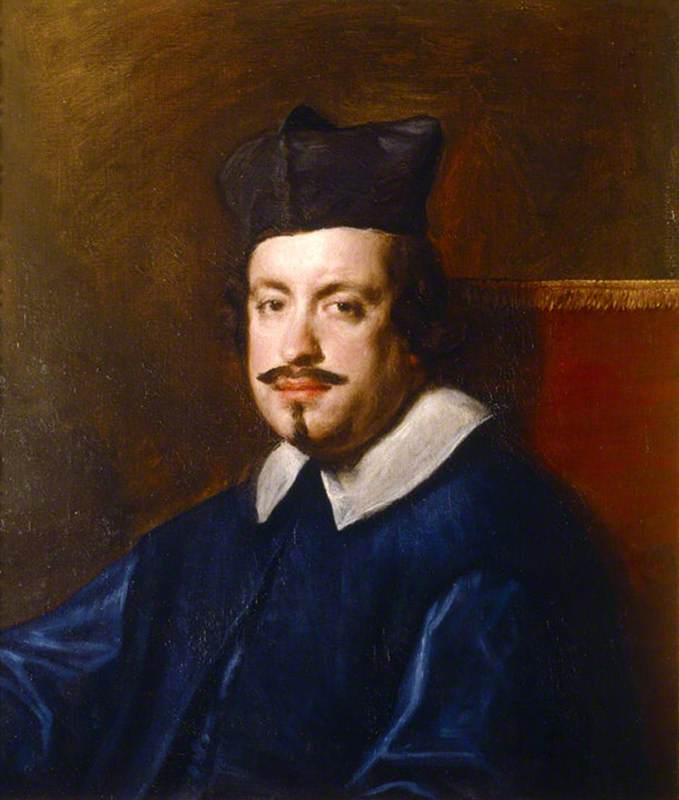
- Camillo Massimi portrayed by Diego Velázquez.
- Church: Roman Catholic Church
- Appointed: 19 October 1676
- Term ended: 12 September 1677
- Previous posts: Cardinal-Priest of Sant'Eusebio (1673-1676); Santa Maria in Domnica (1671-1673); Apostolic Nuncio to Spain (1654-1656); Titular Patriarch of Jerusalem (1653-1671)

Orders
- Consecration: 4 January 1654 by Fabio Chigi
- Created cardinal: 22 December 1670 by Pope Clement X
- Rank: Cardinal-Priest

Personal details
- Born: 20 July 1620 Rome, Papal States
- Died: 12 September 1677 (aged 57) Rome, Papal States
- Coat of arms: Camillo Massimi's coat of arms

Camillo Massimi (20 July 1620 – 12 September 1677) was an Italian cardinal in 17th century Rome, best remembered as a major patron of Baroque artists such as Poussin, Lorrain, Velázquez, Duquesnoy, Algardi, Francesco Fontana and Cosimo Fancelli.

== Biography ==
Born as Carlo in 1620 into the prominent princely Massimo family, he was educated at La Sapienza University. He succeeded at age 20 to the estate of his cousin Camillo, from whom he derived his name. The elder Camillo had been the executor of the will of another great Roman collector, Marchese Vincenzo Giustiniani. He started his ecclesiastical career as papal prelate at a young age and in 1651 he became cleric of the Apostolic Chamber.

On 15 December 1653, Massimo was made titular Patriarch of Jerusalem and a year later as Apostolic Nuncio to Spain. However, Philip IV of Spain refused his appointment as nuncio, complaining he was too friendly with the French. He was forced to stop for a year in a small town between Valencia and Madrid. Back in Italy, Monsignor Camillo Massimo retired in semi-exile from 1658 until the end of the pontificate of Pope Clement IX in 1669, in a town called Roccasecca dei Volsci, in his 'Palazzo Baroniale'.

On 22 December 1670, Pope Clement X elevated him to Cardinal with the title of S. Maria in Domnica, which Massimo later changed to that of Sant'Eusebio. He took part in the 1676 Papal conclave. In the same year, he was opted for the title of Sant'Anastasia al Palatino. He died in 1677 in Rome.

Massimi's portraits were painted by both Diego Velázquez and Carlo Maratta. He reorganised the Roman academy of the Umoristi. He had copies, made by Pietro Santo Bartoli, of the illustrations of an antique edition of Virgil and drawings based on the ancient paintings found in the Tomb of the Nasonii in Rome. He was also aided the eccentric former Queen Christina of Sweden with her library and collections.

== Sources ==
- Haskell, Francis (1993). "Chapter 6". Patrons and Painters: Art and Society in Baroque Italy. 1980. Yale University Press. pp. 114–119.
- Miranda, Salvador. "MASSIMI, Camillo (1620-1677)". The Cardinals of the Holy Roman Church. Florida International University. OCLC 53276621.
- Cheney, David M. "Camillo Cardinal Massimi". Catholic-Hierarchy.org. ^{[self-published]}
