= Bovino =

- Comune
- Comune di Bovino
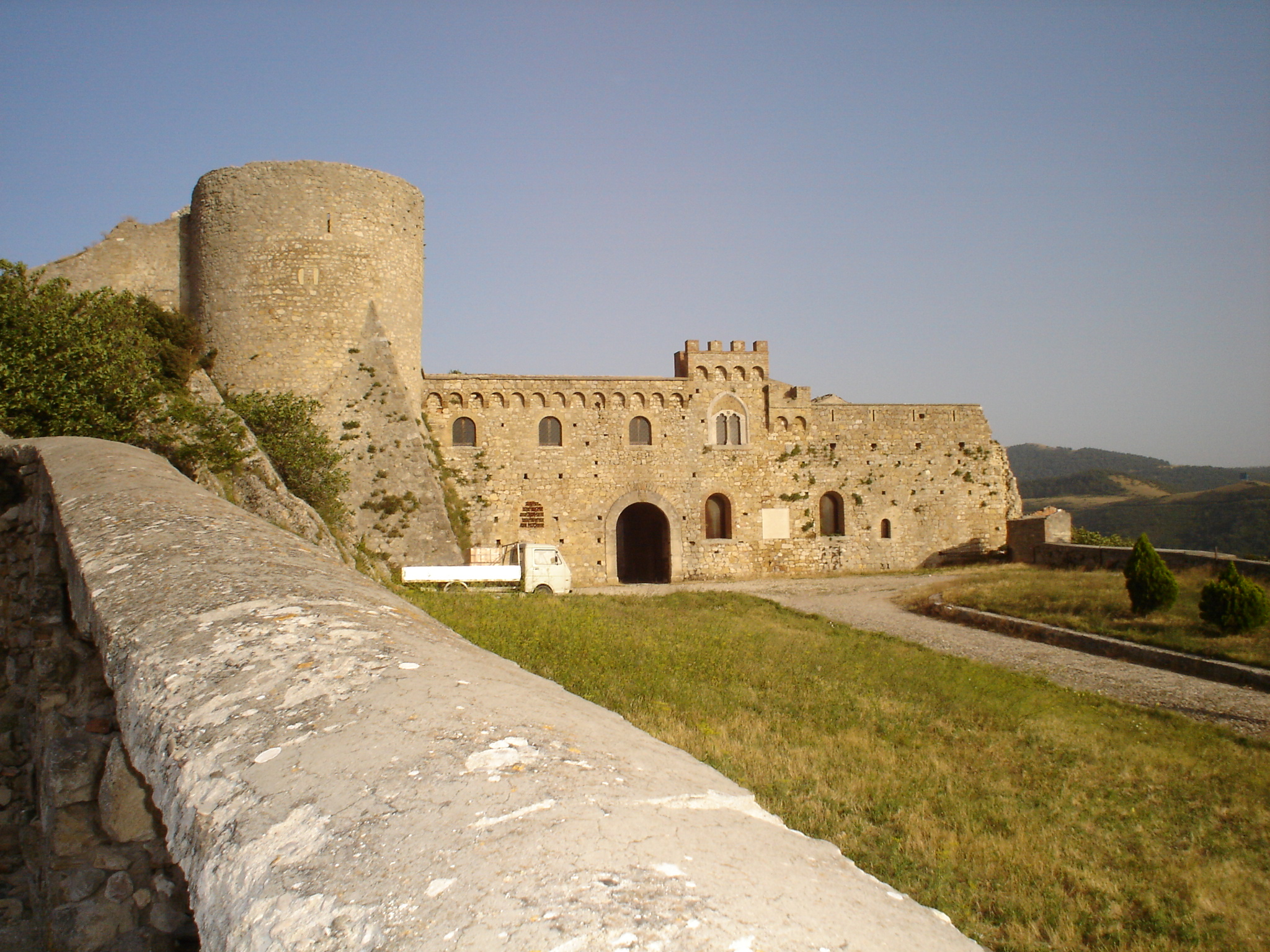
- Romanic castle of Bovino with Norman Tower

- Location within Italy Location within Apulia
- Coordinates: 41°15′N 15°21′E
- Country: Italy
- Region: Apulia
- Province: Foggia (FG)
- Frazioni: Ponte Bovino, Radogna

Government
  - Mayor: Michele Dedda

Area
  - Total: 84 km^{2} (32 sq mi)
- Elevation: 620 m (2,030 ft)

Population (31 December 2014)
  - Total: 3,385
  - Density: 40/km^{2} (100/sq mi)
- Demonym: Bovinesi
- Time zone: UTC+1 (CET)
  - Summer (DST): UTC+2 (CEST)
- Postal code: 71023
- Dialing code: 0881
- Patron saint: Maria SS. of Valleverde
- Saint day: August 29
- Website: Official website

Bovino is a comune and hill town at the eastern side of the Apennines in the province of Foggia, Apulia, southern Italy.

Located within the woody Daunian Mountains as a terrace over the Tavoliere plains, Bovino is one of I Borghi più belli d'Italia ("The most beautiful villages of Italy").

== History ==
Bovino has more than two thousand years of history, and in 323 BC, participated in the Samnite Wars, fighting against the Romans. The Romans subsequently rebuilt the town, calling it Vibinum. During the Second Carthaginian War, it is likely that Hannibal camped on Monte Castro during his march to Rome.

In 663, after being conquered by the Lombards, Bovino was destroyed during the war with the Byzantines. In 876, after the Byzantine reconquest, the walls around Bovino were rebuilt by Emperor Basil I, and the streets were laid out in their characteristic narrow design. In the 11th century, during the Norman conquest of southern Italy, Bovino was one of the last remaining Byzantine strongholds. In 1656, bubonic plague killed the majority of the local population, and only 1,200 people survived.

== Main sights ==
The largest single edifice is the Norman castle. It occupies a commanding view of the village. The courtyard is permanently open.

The villa communale is a municipal park with ponds and fountains, housing an extensive arboretum lined with horse chestnut trees.

There are several panorama viewpoints. Most are next to remains of the original Roman wall. Several streets in the historic centre are still stepped and paved with cobbles. Other ancient sights include the Roman aqueduct.

Bovino is the seat of the Roman Catholic Diocese of Bovino. Bovino is home to several ancient churches. The oldest is St. Peter's (Italian San Pietro), which was built on the site of an ancient temple dedicated to Hercules. The Gothic-style Church of the Rosary (Italian Chiesa del Rosario) has an elongated brick campanile. The Cathedral is dedicated to the Blessed Virgin Mary. Its interior varies in style according to the construction period. The most ancient section is the chapel of San Marco in Ercana, housing the relics of this local patron saint. The church of San Pietro contains a painting of the crucifixion of St. Peter by the Master of Bovino of the Caravaggio school.

As archbishop of Kraków, the future Pope John Paul II visited Bovino in 1965 together with eleven other Polish bishops. He then laid the foundation stone of what was to become the Santuario di Santa Maria di Valleverde, dedicated to an alleged appearance of the Virgin Mary. Situated part way up hill from the main SS90 trunk road to Bovino, the Santuario has become a popular pilgrimage site. Wojtyła returned as Pope in the 1980s in order to officially ratify the Marian apparition and open the church.

== Events ==
Bovino is home to several festivals, the largest being the "Feast of August 29th". Dating back to the time of the ruling feudal Guevara family, Bovino has a fair on that day. In addition to visits by a large number of vendors, there is usually a holy procession featuring the statue of the Madonna of Valleverde. The day is also marked by an historic cavalcade.

== Economy ==
Bovino's economy is principally agrarian. Main crops are olive oil, sunflower oil, wine and tomatoes. Family small holdings have increasingly given way to co-operatives, allowing farmers to gain access to larger markets. Grape vines are generally of the sangiovese variety. Bovino grows winter tomatoes in large greenhouses. Tomatoes are of the plum tomato variety. Bovino also has its own varieties of Puglia cheeses, including mozzarella, caciocavallo, ricotta and provolone. The main industrial area of Bovino is Bovino Scalo, situated 8 kilometres (5 miles) downhill by the River Cervaro. This zone marks a boundary for the Tavoliere d'Italia, a large fertile plain famous for producing high quality durum wheat for pasta. Nearby Foggia claims several of the world's most famous pasta manufacturers, including Barilla and Buitoni.

Of increasing importance is tourism. As a member of the society of "Italy's most beautiful villages", Bovino is recognised for its natural environment and archeological heritage. There are restaurants which specialise in local food. A handful of hotels are available for tourists.

FCA (former FIAT) has become an important local employer since the construction of the Punto model began at Melfi. There is a bus service to the factory for employees.
