= Diocese of Bovino =

The Diocese of Bovino (Latin: Bivinensis, or Bovinensis) is a Latin Church diocese of the Catholic Church in the civil province of Apulia, southern Italy. It is 23 mi (37 km) southwest of Foggia. It was established in the tenth century, and was a suffragan of the archdiocese of Benevento. In 1986 it was merged into the Archdiocese of Foggia-Bovino. In 1980, the diocese claimed 23,500 adherents, served by 26 priests.

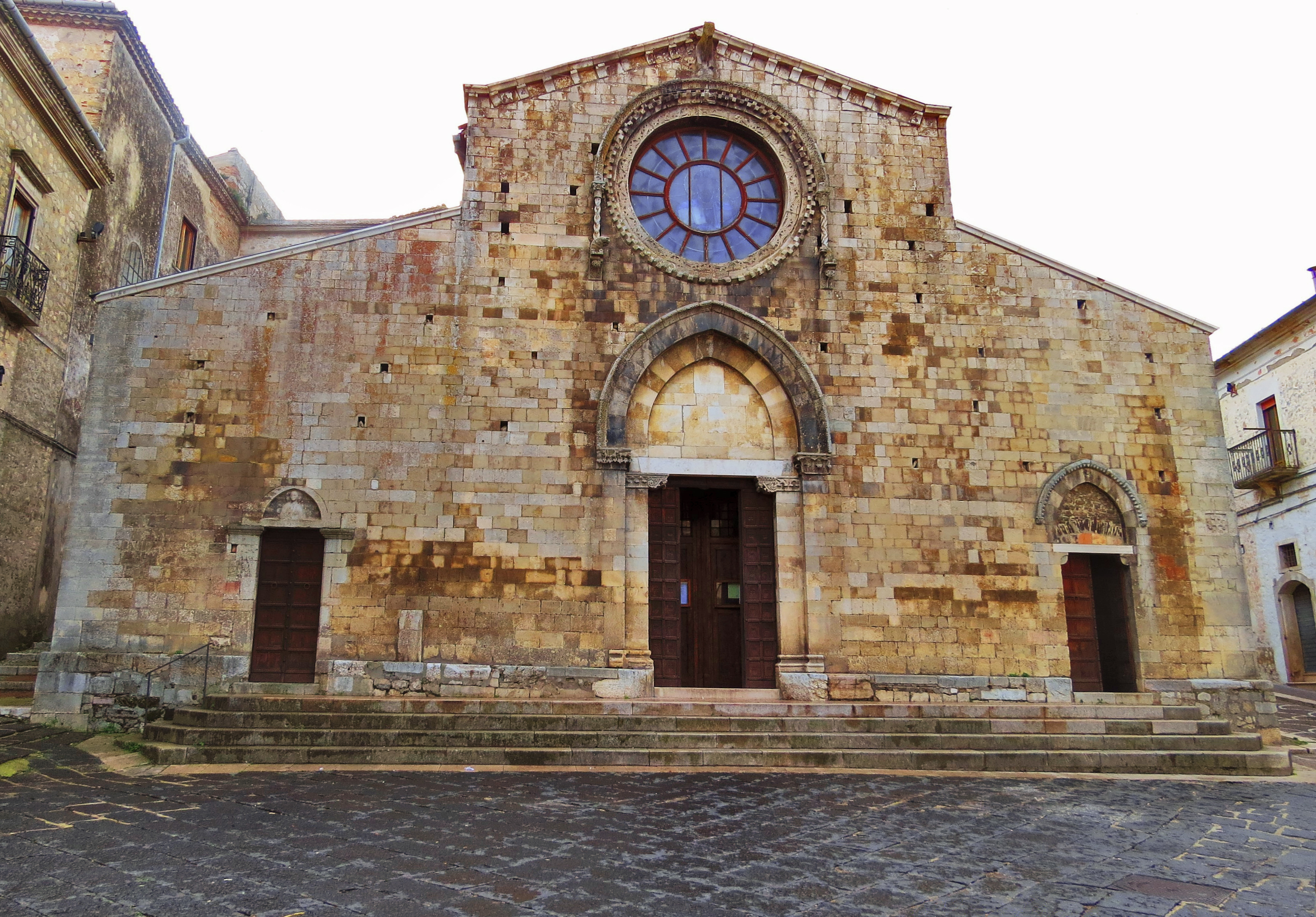
The cathedral of S. Maria Assunta e S. Marco, Bovino

== History ==
It used to be claimed that the diocese of Bovino was founded by the end of the fifth century. The bishop Johannes who was present at the Roman synod of 499 was claimed as the proof of the existence of the diocese, but that Bishop Johannes has been shown to be bishop of Vibona in the Abruzzi. There is therefore no evidence for the diocese of Bovino before the 10th century.

In 944, Pope Marinus II (942–946) confirmed the privileges and possessions of the archdiocese of Benevento, which included Bovino.

The diocese was greatly affected by the 1629–1631 Italian plague. Bishop Giovanni Antonio Galderisi (1616–1658) blessed a statue of S. Dominic in the cathedral on 16 January 1631, in the hope of arresting the pestilence. The mayor and city council named him their protector, and provided an annual sum for a votive light in front of his statue.

=== Chapter and cathedral ===
The cathedral of Bovino is dedicated to the Assumption of the Body of the Virgin Mary into Heaven, and to S. Marco, once bishop of Lucera.

The cathedral was administered by a corporative body called the Chapter, which was composed of three dignities (the Archdeacon, the Dean, and the Cantor) and six canons. Since the cathedral was also a parish church, there were also a body of nine "capitolari", who saw to the daily needs of the cathedral and its parishioners. There was also another parish church, and together with the cathedral some 2,000 parishioners were served. In 1685, there were four dignities and six canons. In his first ad limina report, in 1660, Bishop Vincenzo Raviglioni informed the papacy that he had found the cathedral in a dilapidated state.

The diocese also had six archpriests, each stationed in a town or village ("loca").

=== Napoleonic disruptions ===
From 1809 to 1815, Pope Pius VII was prisoner of Napoleon in France, and was unable and unwilling to cooperate with Napoleon's brother-in-law, Joachim Murat who had been named King of Naples (1808–1815). In 1815 the Congress of Vienna restored King Ferdinand I of Naples and Sicily (Kingdom of the Two Sicilies), and Pius VII ceded him the papal rights to Benevento (which included Bovino). A concordat (treaty) was signed on 16 February 1818, and in a separate document, dated 7 March 1818, Pius VII granted Ferdinand the right to nominate all bishops in the Kingdom of the Two Sicilies.

On 27 June 1818, Pius VII issued the bull De Ulteriore, in which he reestablished the metropolitan archbishopric of Benevento. Bovino was a suffragan diocese of the archdiocese of Benevento.

=== Diocesan reorganization ===
On 14 December 1974, Pope Paul VI appointed Giuseppe Lenotti, the Bishop of Foggia (1962–1979), to be at the same time Bishop of Bovino. On the same day, he was then also named Bishop of Troia. On 4 April 1981, Pope John Paul II appointed as successor to Bishop Lenotti, Bishop Salvatore De Giorgi, with the title of metropolitan archbishop of Foggia, Bovino, and Troia.

With special faculties granted by Pope Paul VI, the Sacred Congregation for Bishops issued the decree Quo Aptius on 15 November 1977, by which an exchange of territories between the dioceses of Bovino and Ariano Irpino was authorized, Boviano to surrender the town of Montaguto to Ariano, and Ariano to surrender the town of Monteleone to Bovino.

The Second Vatican Council (1962–1965), in order to ensure that all Catholics received proper spiritual attention, decreed the reorganization of the diocesan structure of Italy and the consolidation of small and struggling dioceses.

On 18 February 1984, the Vatican and the Italian State signed a new and revised concordat. Based on the revisions, a set of Normae was issued on 15 November 1984, which was accompanied in the next year, on 3 June 1985, by enabling legislation. According to the agreement, the practice of having one bishop govern two separate dioceses at the same time, aeque personaliter, was abolished. Instead, the Vatican continued consultations which had begun under Pope John XXIII for the merging of small dioceses, especially those with personnel and financial problems, into one combined diocese.

On 30 September 1986, Pope John Paul II ordered that the dioceses of Foggio e Bovino be merged into one diocese with one bishop, with the Latin title Archidioecesis Fodiana-Bovinensis. The seat of the diocese was to be in Foggia, and the cathedral of Foggia was to serve as the cathedral of the merged dioceses. The cathedral in Bovino was to become a co-cathedral, and the cathedral Chapter was to be a Capitulum Concathedralis. There was to be only one diocesan Tribunal, in Foggia, and likewise one seminary, one College of Consultors, and one Priests' Council. The territory of the new diocese was to include the territory of the former diocese of Bovino.

The diocese of Troia was also suppressed, united with the diocese of Lucera as the Diocese of Lucera-Troia.

== Bishops of Bovino ==
=== to 1500 ===
...

- Johannes (attested 971)

...

- [Anonymous] (attested 1059 – 1061)

...

- Hugo (attested 1092 – 1099)

...

- Giso (attested 1122)

...

- Alexander (attested 1131 – 1137)

...

- Pandulfus (attested 1175)

...

- Robertus (1190 – 1215)
- Guilelmus (1215 – 1220)
- Petrus (1220 – 1238)
- Matthaeus (1238 – 1240)
- Manerius (1240 – 1244)
- Johannes Baptista (attested 1244)

...

- Henricus (1269 – 1285?)
- Maynerius (attested 1289)
- Richardus (1290 – 1300)
- Petrus
- Alexander (1304 – 1309)
- Jacobus (1309 – 1324)
- Rostagnus (1329)
- Rogerius, O.F.M. (1 May 1329 - 1340)
- Matthaeus (1340 - )
- Guilelmus de Cabilone, O.P. (8 Mar 1346 - 1349)
- Nicolaus, O.S.B. (19 Jun 1349 - 1353)
- Petrus de Argentino, O.E.S.A. (12 Feb 1354 - 1370)
- Domenico de Sassinoro (31 Jan 1371 - Mar 1371)
- Bartolomeo de Sperella, O.F.M. (3 Sep 1371 - 1381)
- Pietro, O.E.S.A.(1381 - )
- Bernardo Ferrari (2 Sep 1386 - )
- Antonio, O.F.M. (1397 - 1403) Roman Obedience
- Bartolomeo Vanni, O.E.S.A. (24 Aug 1403 - 1407 Resigned)
- Pietro da Auletta, O.P. (15 Apr 1407 - 1425)
- Bartolomeo de Sperella, O.F.M. (1425 - 1427)
- Pietro degli Scaleri (1427 - 1463)
- Natale de Lombardi (1463 - 1477)
- Giovanni Candida (2 Mar 1477 - 1499)
- Giovanni Battista Gagliardi (1499 - 1510)

=== 1500 to 1800 ===
- Giovanni Battista Gagliardi (1499 – 1510)
- Joannes de Capellaniis (1510 – 1529)

Benedetto de Accolti (1530 – 1535 Resigned) Administrator
Esteban Gabriel Merino (1535), Administrator

- Alfonso Oliva, O.S.A. (20 Aug 1535 – 1541)
- Ferdinando D'Anna (13 May 1541 – 1565)
- Giovanni Domenico D'Anna (1565 – 1578)
- Angelo Giustiniani (14 May 1578 – 26 Aug 1600)
- Paolo Tolosa, C.R. (1601 – 1615)
- Giovanni Antonio Galderisi (1616 – 1658)
- Vincenzo Roviglioni (1658 – 1669)
- Francesco Antonio Curzio (1670 – 1672)
- Giuseppe di Giacomo (27 Feb 1673 – 21 Mar 1684)
- Angelo Cerasi (5 Feb 1685 – 11 Dec 1728)
- Antonio Lucci, O.F.M. Conv. (7 Feb 1729 – Jul 1752)
- Tommaso Pacelli (27 Nov 1752 – 4 Oct 1780)
- Nicola Molinari, O.F.M. Cap. (15 Dec 1783 – 18 Jan 1792)
- Vincenzo Maria Parruco Tries, O.P. (1798)

=== 1800 to 1986 ===
Sede vacante (1798–1818)

- Paolo Garzilli (1818 – 1832)
- Francesco Iovinelli, C.M. (29 Jul 1833 – 8 Nov 1836)
- Francesco Saverio Farace (2 Oct 1837 – 10 May 1851)
- Filippo Gallo, C.M. (18 Mar 1852 – 9 Mar 1858 Resigned)
- Giovanni Montuoro (20 Jun 1859 – 24 Mar 1862)
- Alessandro Cantoli, O.F.M. (22 Dec 1871 – 16 Oct 1884)
- Salvatore Maria Bressi, O.F.M. Cap. (10 Nov 1884 – 1887)
- Michele de Jorio (25 Nov 1887 – 1898)
- Giuseppe Padula (24 Mar 1898 – 1908)
- Uberto Maria Fiodo (9 Dec 1910 – 1922)
- Cornelio Sebastiano Cuccarollo, O.F.M. Cap. (27 Mar 1923 – 1930)
- Innocenzo Alfredo Russo, O.F.M. (13 Mar 1937 – 9 Dec 1959 Retired)
- Renato Luisi (17 Dec 1959 – 1963)
- Giuseppe Lenotti (14 Dec 1974 – 28 Jan 1981)
- Salvatore De Giorgi (4 Apr 1981 – 1986)

== See also ==
- Roman Catholic Archdiocese of Foggia–Bovino
- List of Catholic dioceses in Italy

== Bibliography ==
=== Episcopal lists ===
- Eubel, Conradus, ed. (1913). Hierarchia catholica (in Latin). Vol. I (second ed.). Münster: Libreria Regensbergiana.
- Eubel, Conradus, ed. (1914). Hierarchia catholica (in Latin). Vol. II (second ed.). Münster: Libreria Regensbergiana.
- Eubel, Conradus; Gulik, Guilelmus (1923). Hierarchia catholica (in Latin). Vol. III (second ed.). Münster: Libreria Regensbergiana.
- Gams, Pius Bonifatius (1873). Series episcoporum Ecclesiae catholicae: quotquot innotuerunt a beato Petro apostolo (in Latin). Ratisbon: Typis et Sumptibus Georgii Josephi Manz. pp. 861–862.
- Gauchat, Patritius (Patrice) (1935). Hierarchia catholica (in Latin). Vol. IV (1592-1667). Münster: Libraria Regensbergiana.
- Ritzler, Remigius; Sefrin, Pirminus (1952). Hierarchia catholica medii et recentis aevi (in Latin). Vol. V (1667-1730). Patavii: Messagero di S. Antonio.
- Ritzler, Remigius; Sefrin, Pirminus (1958). Hierarchia catholica medii et recentis aevi (in Latin). Vol. VI (1730-1799). Patavii: Messagero di S. Antonio.
- Ritzler, Remigius; Sefrin, Pirminus (1968). Hierarchia Catholica medii et recentioris aevi (in Latin). Vol. VII (1800–1846). Monasterii: Libreria Regensburgiana.
- Remigius Ritzler; Pirminus Sefrin (1978). Hierarchia catholica Medii et recentioris aevi (in Latin). Vol. VIII (1846–1903). Il Messaggero di S. Antonio.
- Pięta, Zenon (2002). Hierarchia catholica medii et recentioris aevi (in Latin). Vol. IX (1903–1922). Padua: Messagero di San Antonio. ISBN 978-88-250-1000-8.

=== Studies ===
- Cappelletti, Giuseppe (1864). Le chiese d'Italia: dalla loro origine sino ai nostri giorni (in Italian). Vol. XIX. Venezia: G. Antonelli. pp. 203–221.
- D'Avino, Vincenzo (1848). Cenni storici sulle chiese arcivescovili, vescovili, e prelatizie (nulluis) del Regno delle Due Sicilie (in Italian). Napoli: Ranucci. pp. 79–93. [article written by Marco Lolatte]
- Kehr, Paulus Fridolin (1962). Italia pontificia. Regesta pontificum Romanorum. Vol. IX: Samnia – Apulia – Lucania. Berlin: Weidmann. (in Latin). pp. 141–142.
- Mattei-Cerasoli, L. (1918), "Di alcuni vescovi poco noti," (in Italian), in: Archivio storico per le provincie Napolitane XLIII (n.s. IV 1918), pp. 363–382, at pp. 371–372.
- Nicastro, Carlo Gaetano (1984). Bovino, storia di popolo, vescovi, duchi e briganti. (in Italian). Ammin. Provinc. di Capitanata, 1984.
- Ughelli, Ferdinando; Coleti, Niccolo (1721). Italia sacra, sive De episcopis Italiae et insularum adjacentium. Vol. Tomus octavus (8). Venice: Apud Sebastianum Coleti. pp. 249–270.
- Vattasso, Marco (1900). Le due Bibbie di Bovino: ora Codici vaticani latini 10510-10511, e le loro note storiche. (in Italian). Roma: Tipografia Vaticana.
