= Kräuter =

Kräuter is a German surname. Notable people with the surname include:

- Aaron Krauter, American politician
- Mónica Kräuter (born 1967), Venezuelan chemist
- Neil C. Krauter, American businessman
- Sebastian Kräuter (1922–2008), Romanian Roman Catholic bishop
- Stefan Krauter (born 1963), German scientist

== See also ==
- Kratter, Kreuter, Kreutter, Kreuder, Greuter
