= Kreuder =

Kreuder is a German surname. Notable people with the surname include:

- Ernst Kreuder (1903 — 1972), German author
- Peter Kreuder (1905 – 1981), German-Austrian pianist, composer and conductor

== See also ==
- Kräuter, Kreuter, Kreutter, Kreuther, Greuter
