= Fortunato Durante =

Italian Catholic bishop (1655–1714)

Most Reverend Fortunato Durante
- Bishop of Squillace
- Church: Catholic Church
- Diocese: Diocese of Squillace
- In office: 1697–1714
- Predecessor: Gennaro Crespino
- Successor: Marco Antonio Attaffi

Orders
- Consecration: 24 November 1697 by Pier Matteo Petrucci

Personal details
- Born: 1655 Albi, Italy
- Died: 23 November 1714 (age 59) Squillace, Italy

Fortunato Durante (1655–1714) was a Roman Catholic prelate who served as Bishop of Squillace (1697–1714).

== Biography ==
Fortunato Durante was born in Albi, Italy. On 20 November 1697, he was appointed during the papacy of Pope Innocent XII as Bishop of Squillace. On 24 November 1697, he was consecrated bishop by Pier Matteo Petrucci, Cardinal-Priest of San Marcello, with Prospero Bottini, Titular Archbishop of Myra, and Giuseppe Felice Barlacci, Bishop Emeritus of Narni, serving as co-consecrators. He served as Bishop of Squillace until his death on 23 November 1714.

== External links and additional sources ==
- Cheney, David M. "Diocese of Squillace". Catholic-Hierarchy.org. (for Chronology of Bishops) ^{[self-published]}
- Chow, Gabriel. "Diocese of Squillace (Italy)". GCatholic.org. (for Chronology of Bishops) ^{[self-published]}

Catholic Church titles
Preceded by Gennaro Crespino	Bishop of Squillace; 1697–1714	Succeeded by Marco Antonio Attaffi
