= Carlo Carafa =

Italian cardinal

His Eminence Carlo Carafa
- Cardinal-Deacon of San Nicola in Carcere
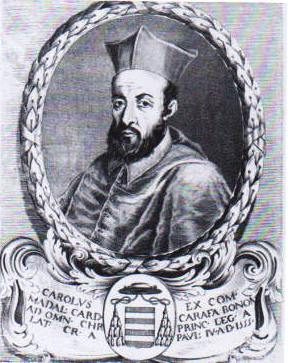
- Engraving of Cardinal Carafa, 16th century
- Church: Catholic Church
- Appointed: January 1560
- Term ended: 6 March 1561
- Predecessor: Giovanni Battista Consiglieri
- Successor: Francesco Gonzaga
- Previous posts: See list: Cardinal-Deacon of Santi Vito e Modesto (1555–1560); Administrator of Comminges (1555-1561)

Orders
- Created cardinal: 7 June 1555 by Pope Paul IV
- Rank: Cardinal-Deacon

Personal details
- Born: 29 March 1517 Naples, Italy
- Died: 6 March 1561 (aged 43) Castel Sant'Angelo, Rome
- Coat of arms

Carlo Carafa (29 March 1517 – 6 March 1561) was an Italian cardinal, and Cardinal Nephew of Pope Paul IV Carafa, whose policies he directed and whom he served as papal legate in Paris, Venice and Brussels.

== Early years ==
Styles of Carlo Carafa
- Reference style: His Eminence
- Spoken style: Your Eminence
- Informal style: Cardinal
- See: Naples

He was born at Naples into one of the city's most ancient and distinguished families, a younger son of Giovanni Alfonso Carafa, count of Montorio, and his countess, Caterina Cantelma. One brother was Giovanni Carafa, Duke of Paliano another, Antonio Carafa (1520—1588), was made marchese di Montebello.

Without making a name for himself, he had a long and dubious career as a mercenary soldier in Italy and Germany. He entered the household of Cardinal Pompeo Colonna at an early age, as a page and was enrolled in the Order of St John of Jerusalem later, that of Pierluigi Farnese, Duke of Castro (later Duke of Parma), the son of Paul III. He then fought under the Alfonso d'Avalos, Marchese del Vasto, in Lombardy and Piedmont, and under Ottavio Farnese, Duke of Parma, in Flanders and Germany, fighting Protestants in the name of the Emperor. Here an incident occurred that reinforced perceptions among contemporaries for greed, arrogance and a violent nature: his possession of a captive gentleman worth a considerable ransom was challenged by a Spaniard, whose right was upheld by his compatriot, the Duke of Alba; and in the aftermath Carlo, pursuing his adversary to provoke a duel was incarcerated at Trento until he agreed not to pursue the vendetta.

He was subsequently exiled from Naples in 1545 for murder and banditry and, having withdrawn to Benevento, was embroiled in another assassination, and was then alleged to have perpetrated the massacre of Spanish soldiers as they recuperated in a hospital in Corsica.

== Cardinal Nephew ==
Two weeks after Giovanni Pietro Carafa was elected pope, as Paul IV, he raised Carlo to the cardinalate on 7 June 1555. Carlo assisted his uncle with diplomatic work during the Italian War of 1551–1559, during which he supported the pope's search of a military alliance with the Ottoman Empire against Holy Roman Emperor Charles V. The Cardinal-nephew established thus an epistolary relationship with Sultan Suleiman the Magnificent in order to seek the support of his navy against the emperor's Italian territories.

His tenure as Cardinal-nephew was not a great success, though, and he and Paul IV effectively brought the Papacy to a humiliating defeat against the Spanish that nearly resulted in another Sack of Rome. Carlo's government proved unpopular and he developed a reputation for avarice, cruelty and licentiousness, as well as for homosexual sodomy (Paul had chastised Cardinal Ghisleri for not sharing his suspicions on this latter point). In January 1559, Paul finally accepted the accuracy of the accusations made and exiled both his nephews from Rome and replaced Carlo as Cardinal Nephew with Carlo's own nephew Alfonso Carafa, Cardinal Archbishop of Naples.

== Arrest and death ==
In June 1560, Paul's successor, Pope Pius IV arrested the leading members of the family - Carlo, his brother Duke Govanni, and their nephew the Cardinal Archbishop of Naples, seizing their papers, and levying a range of charges relating to abuses of power during Paul's reign. Carlo was charged with murder, sodomy, and the promotion of Protestantism. After a nine-month trial, he was condemned along with his brother, and was executed by strangulation at Castel Sant' Angelo on the night of 6 March 1561. His execution was considered at the time to have been motivated primarily by political factors such as his pro-French, anti-Spanish policies.

On 26 September 1567, the sentence was declared unjust by Pope Pius V. The memory of the victims was vindicated and their estates restored.

== Bibliography ==
- Aubert, Alberto (1999). Paolo IV: politica, inquisizione e storiografia (in Italian). Firenze: Le lettere. ISBN 978-88-7166-437-8.
- Duruy, George (1882). Le cardinal Carlo Carafa (in French). Paris: Hachette.
- Pattenden, Miles (2013). Pius IV and the Fall of The Carafa: Nepotism and Papal Authority in Counter-Reformation Rome. Oxford: OUP. pp. 2–. ISBN 978-0-19-164961-5.
- Pieper, Anton (1897). Die päpstlichen Legaten und Nuntien in Deutschland, Frankreich und Spanien seit der Mitte des sechzehnten Jahrhunderts (in German). Münster: Verlag der Aschendorffschen Buchdruckerei. pp. 71–118, 184–207.
