= Giuseppe Felice Barlacci =

Bishop of Narni from 1683 to 1690

Most Reverend Giuseppe Felice Barlacci
- Bishop of Narni
- Church: Catholic Church
- Diocese: Diocese of Narni
- In office: 1683–1690
- Predecessor: Ottavio Avio
- Successor: Francesco Picarelli

Orders
- Consecration: 30 May 1683 by Alessandro Crescenzi (cardinal)

Personal details
- Born: 1633 Rome, Italy
- Died: 27 November 1708 (age 75) Narni, Italy

Giuseppe Felice Barlacci (1633 – 27 November 1708) was a Roman Catholic prelate who served as Bishop of Narni (1683–1690).

== Biography ==
Giuseppe Felice Barlacci was born in Rome, Italy in 1633. On 24 May 1683, he was appointed during the papacy of Pope Innocent XI as Bishop of Narni. On 30 May 1683, he was consecrated bishop by Alessandro Crescenzi (cardinal), Cardinal-Priest of Santa Prisca, with Francesco Casati, Titular Archbishop of Trapezus, and Francesco de' Marini, Titular Archbishop of Amasea, serving as co-consecrators. He served as Bishop of Narni until his resignation on 1 May 1690. He died on 27 November 1708.

== Episcopal succession ==
While bishop, he was the principal co-consecrator of:

- Girolamo Compagnone, Archbishop of Rossano (1685);
- Angelo Cerasi, Bishop of Bovino (1685);
- Bartolomeo Riberi, Bishop of Nicotera (1691);
- Sebastiano Perissi, Bishop of Nocera de' Pagani (1692);
- Luca Antonio Eustachi, Bishop of Città di Castello (1693);
- Michael Cantelmi, Bishop of Umbriatico (1693);
- John Baptist Sleyne, Bishop of Cork and Cloyne (1693);
- Placido Scoppa (Stoppa), Archbishop of Dubrovnik (1693);
- Benedetto Luperti, Bishop of Cagli (1694);
- Lorenzo Kreutter de Corvinis, Bishop of Vieste (1697);
- Fortunato Durante, Bishop of Squillace (1697); and
- Ambrosio Angelini, Bishop of Acquapendente (1697).

== See also ==
- Catholic Church in Italy

== External links and additional sources ==
- Cheney, David M. "Diocese of Narni". Catholic-Hierarchy.org. (Chronology of Bishops) ^{[self-published]}
- Chow, Gabriel. "Diocese of Narni (Italy)". GCatholic.org. Archived from the original on February 4, 2014. (Chronology of Bishops) ^{[self-published]}

Catholic Church titles
Preceded by Ottavio Avio	Bishop of Narni; 1683–1690	Succeeded by Francesco Picarelli
