= Camillo Tarquini =

Italian Cardinal, Jesuit canonist and archaeologist

His Eminence Camillo Tarquini S.J.
- Cardinal-Deacon of San Nicola in Carcere
- Church: Roman Catholic Church
- Appointed: 16 January 1874
- Term ended: 15 February 1874
- Predecessor: Pietro Marini
- Successor: Domenico Bartolini

Orders
- Ordination: 21 September 1833
- Created cardinal: 22 December 1873 by Pope Pius IX
- Rank: Cardinal-Deacon

Personal details
- Born: Camillo Tarquini; 27 September 1810 Marta, Papal States
- Died: 15 February 1874 (aged 63) Rome, Kingdom of Italy
- Parents: Giuseppe Tarquini; Maria Anna Durani

Camillo Tarquini (27 September 1810 in Marta, located in the Montefiascone region of Italy – 15 February 1874 in Rome) was an Italian Cardinal, Jesuit canonist and archaeologist.

== Early life ==
Tarquini was born 27 September 1810; he was one of three children born to Giuseppe Tarquini and Maria Anna Durani di Proceno. He was ordained as a priest on 21 September 1833 and then studied at the Sapienza University in Rome. In 1835 he published a thesis for his doctorate on canon law: Institutionum juris canonici tabulae synopticae juxta ordinem habitum a Joanne Devote; he entered the Society of Jesus on August 27, 1837.

== Career ==
Tarquini held the chair of canon law at the Roman College, and he attracted notice by his explanations of sacred scripture at the Gesu. Besides his published works, he contributed many articles to reviews, notably to the Civiltà Cattolica. It is principally as a canonist that he achieved fame. His first work on the law of the Church to bring him into international celebrity was that on the Regium Placet, or Exequatur, for Papal Bulls (Rome, 1851), which was translated into German, Spanish, and French. This treatise has generally been published as an appendix to his main work on canon law: Juris ecclesiastici publici institutiones (Rome, 1862), which has gone through many editions. The work was translated into French (Brussels, 1868). Other works on canon law are his treatise on the French Concordat of 1801 (Rome, 1871), and a disquisition on the Pauline privilege (published posthumously in 1888).

Though best known as a canonist, Tarquini was also an archaeologist of no mean repute, especially on matters relating to the ancient Etruscans. His earliest archaeological treatise is Breve commento di antiche iscrizioni appartenenti alla citta di Fermo (1847). He began the Etruscan series of his works specifically with Dichiarazione dell' epigrafe del lampadario di Cortona (1862), which was soon followed by a more general treatise: Dizzertazioni intorno ad alcuni monumenti etruschi (Rome, 1862). The Civilta Cattolica of 1857 and 1858 contains many of Tarquini's articles on Etruscan antiquities, the most noted being: Origini italiche e principalmente etruschi rivelate dei nomi geografici (Ser. 3, Vol. VI); I misteri della lingua etrusca (Vol. VIII); Iscrizioni etrusche in monumenti autofoni (Vol. IX); Di vasi etruschi divinatorii (Vol. X); Iscrizione etrusca di Perugia (Vol. XI); and Sopra il semitismo della lingua etrusca (Ser. 4, Vol. VII). He also wrote an Etruscan grammar and a dictionary of the Etruscan language. Other archaeological treatises are Della iscrizione della cattedra Alessandrina di San Marco (1868), and De L'origine des pheniciens et leur identite avec les Pasteurs qui envahirent l'Egypte (1870). Tarquini was a member of the Roman Pontifical Academy of Archaeology and of the Imperial and Royal Academy of Science of Lucca. He was also president of the historical and archaeological sections of the Accademia dei Quiriti.

He was raised to the cardinalate by Pius IX with the diaconal title of St. Nicholas at the Tullian Prison on 22 December, 1873.

He died from pulmonary disease on 15 February 1874.
