= Girolamo Compagnone =

Most Reverend Girolamo Compagnone
- Archbishop of Rossano
- Church: Catholic Church
- Diocese: Archdiocese of Rossano
- In office: 1685–1687
- Predecessor: Girolamo Orsaja
- Successor: Andrea de Rossi (archbishop)

Orders
- Consecration: 11 February 1685 by Alessandro Crescenzi (cardinal)

Personal details
- Born: 17 January 1620 Aversa, Italy
- Died: 1 November 1687 (age 67) Rossano, Italy

Girolamo Compagnone (17 January 1620 – 1 November 1687) was a Roman Catholic prelate who served as Archbishop of Rossano (1685–1687).

== Biography ==
Girolamo Compagnone was born in Aversa, Italy on 17 January 1620. On 5 February 1685, he was appointed during the papacy of Pope Innocent XI as Archbishop of Rossano. On 11 February 1685, he was consecrated bishop by Alessandro Crescenzi (cardinal), Cardinal-Priest of Santa Prisca, with Pier Antonio Capobianco, Bishop Emeritus of Lacedonia, and Giuseppe Felice Barlacci, Bishop of Narni, serving as co-consecrators. He served as Archbishop of Rossano until his death on 1 November 1687.

== See also ==
- Catholic Church in Italy

== External links and additional sources ==
- Cheney, David M. "Archdiocese of Rossano-Cariati". Catholic-Hierarchy.org. (for Chronology of Bishops)
- Chow, Gabriel. "Archdiocese of Rossano-Cariati (Italy)". GCatholic.org. (for Chronology of Bishops)

Catholic Church titles
Preceded by Girolamo Orsaja	Archbishop of Rossano; 1685–1687	Succeeded by Andrea de Rossi (archbishop)
