= Enrique de Villalobos Xeres =

Roman Catholic bishop (died 1554)

Most Reverend Enrique de Villalobos Xeres
- Bishop of Squillace
- Church: Catholic Church
- In office: 1540–1554
- Predecessor: Enrique de Borja y Aragón
- Successor: Alfonso de Villalobos Xeres
- Previous post: Bishop of Lucera (1538–1540)

Personal details
- Died: 1554 Squillace, Italy

Enrique de Villalobos Xeres (died 1554) was a Roman Catholic prelate who served as Bishop of Squillace (1540–1554) and Bishop of Lucera (1538–1540).

== Biography ==
On 29 July 1538, Enrique de Villalobos Xeres was appointed Bishop of Lucera by Pope Paul III.

On 5 November 1540, he was appointed during the papacy of Pope Paul III as Bishop of Squillace. He served as Bishop of Squillace until his death in 1554.

== External links and additional sources ==
- Cheney, David M. "Diocese of Lucera-Troia". Catholic-Hierarchy.org. (for Chronology of Bishops) ^{[self-published]}
- Chow, Gabriel. "Diocese of Lucera-Troi (Italy)". GCatholic.org. (for Chronology of Bishops) ^{[self-published]}
- Cheney, David M. "Diocese of Squillace". Catholic-Hierarchy.org. (for Chronology of Bishops) ^{[self-published]}
- Chow, Gabriel. "Diocese of Squillace (Italy)". GCatholic.org. (for Chronology of Bishops) ^{[self-published]}

Catholic Church titles
Preceded by Michele Visconti	Bishop of Lucera; 1538–1540	Succeeded by Fabio Mignanelli
Preceded by Enrique de Borja y Aragón	Bishop of Squillace; 1540–1554	Succeeded by Alfonso de Villalobos Xeres
