= Costanzo Zani =

17th-century Catholic bishop

Most Reverend Costanzo Zani
- Bishop of Imola
- Church: Catholic Church
- Diocese: Diocese of Imola
- In office: 1672–1694
- Predecessor: Francesco Maria Ghislieri
- Successor: Taddeo Luigi dal Verme

Orders
- Consecration: 18 Sep 1672 by Cesare Facchinetti

Personal details
- Born: 1622 Rome, Italy
- Died: 16 Jun 1694 (age 72)

Costanzo Zani, O.S.B. (1622–1694) was a Roman Catholic prelate who served as Bishop of Imola (1672–1694).

== Biography ==
Costanzo Zani was born in Rome, Italy in 1622 and ordained a priest in the Order of Saint Benedict. On 12 Sep 1672, he was appointed during the papacy of Pope Clement X as Bishop of Imola. On 18 Sep 1672, he was consecrated bishop by Cesare Facchinetti, Bishop of Spoleto. He served as Bishop of Imola until his death on 16 Jun 1694.

== Episcopal succession ==
While bishop, he was the principal co-consecrator of:

- Pietro Francesco Orsini de Gravina, Archbishop of Manfredonia (1675);
- Domenico Menna, Bishop of Minori (1683);
- Vincenzo Maria Durazzo, Bishop of Savona (1683);
- Ferdinando de Rojas, Bishop of Vigevano (1683);
- Bartolomeo Rosa, Bishop of Lavello (1688);
- Domenico Morelli (bishop), Bishop of Lucera (1688);
- Alessandro Avio, Bishop of Pesaro (1688);
- Alfonso de Aloysio, Bishop of Squillace (1688);
- Francesco Verde, Bishop of Vico Equense (1688); and
- Giovanni Battista Costa, Bishop of Sagone (1688).

== External links and additional sources ==
- Cheney, David M. "Diocese of Imola". Catholic-Hierarchy.org. (for Chronology of Bishops) ^{[self-published]}
- Chow, Gabriel. "Diocese of Imola (Italy)". GCatholic.org. (for Chronology of Bishops) ^{[self-published]}

Catholic Church titles
Preceded by Francesco Maria Ghislieri	Bishop of Imola; 1672–1694	Succeeded by Taddeo Luigi dal Verme
