= Cardinals created by Paul III =

Catholic appointments from 1534 to 1549

Pope Paul III (1468-1549) with Cardinal Alessandro Farnese (1520-80) and Ottavio Farnese, Duke of Parma (1524-86).

Pope Paul III (r. 1534–1549) created 71 cardinals in twelve consistories.

== 18 December 1534 ==
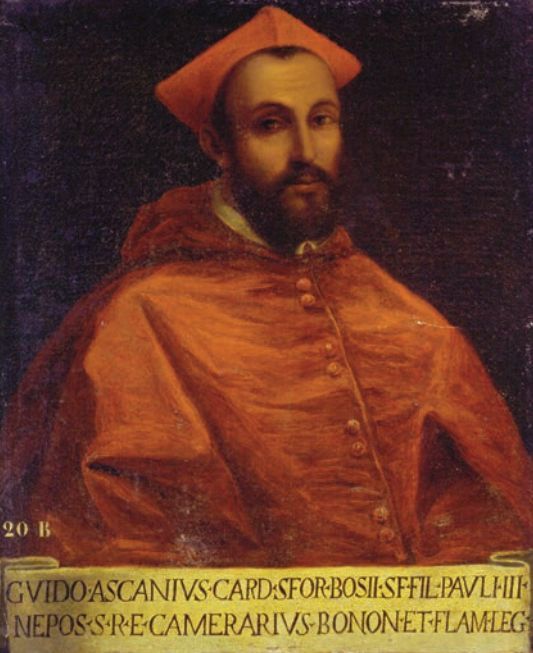
Guido Ascanio Sforza di Santa Fiora (1518-64), made a cardinal on 18 December 1534.

1. Alessandro Farnese, iuniore
2. Guido Ascanio Sforza di Santa Fiora

== 21 May 1535 ==
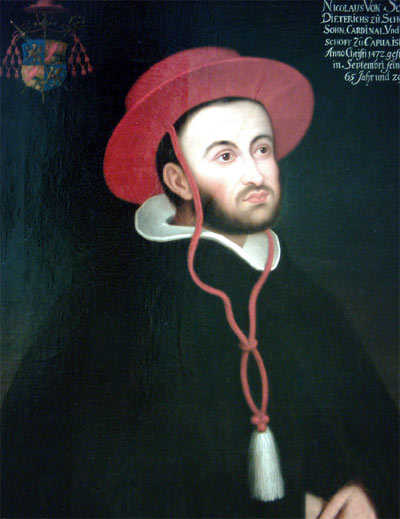
Nikolaus von Schönberg (1472-1537), made a cardinal on 21 May 1535.

1. Nikolaus von Schönberg
2. Girolamo Ghinucci
3. Giacomo Simoneta
4. John Fisher
5. Jean du Bellay
6. Gasparo Contarini
7. Marino Caracciolo

Desiderius Erasmus was offered a cardinal's hat, but he declined.

== 22 December 1536 ==
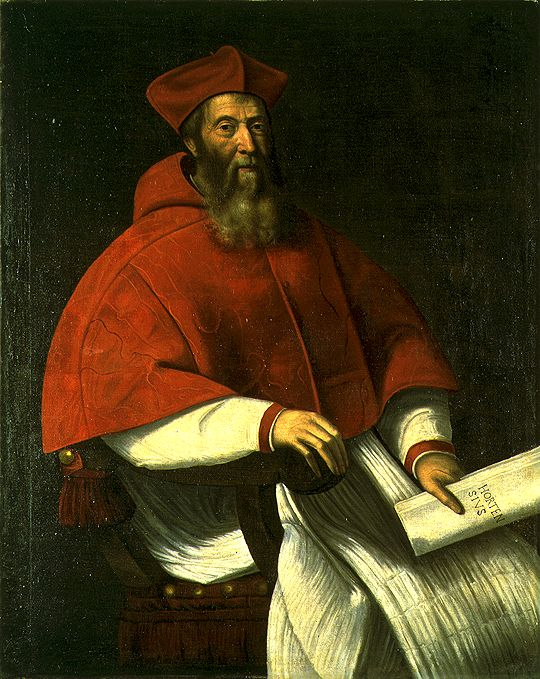
Jacopo Sadoleto (1477-1547), made a cardinal on 22 December 1536.

1. Gian Pietro Carafa
2. Giovanni Maria Ciocchi del Monte
3. Ennio Filonardi
4. Jacopo Sadoleto
5. Cristoforo Giacobazzi
6. Charles de Hémard de Denonville
7. Rodolfo Pio da Carpi
8. Reginald Pole
9. Rodrigo Luis de Borja y de Castre-Pinós
10. Girolamo Aleandro (created in pectore)
11. Niccolò Caetani

== 18 October 1538 ==
1. Pedro Sarmiento

== 20 December 1538 ==
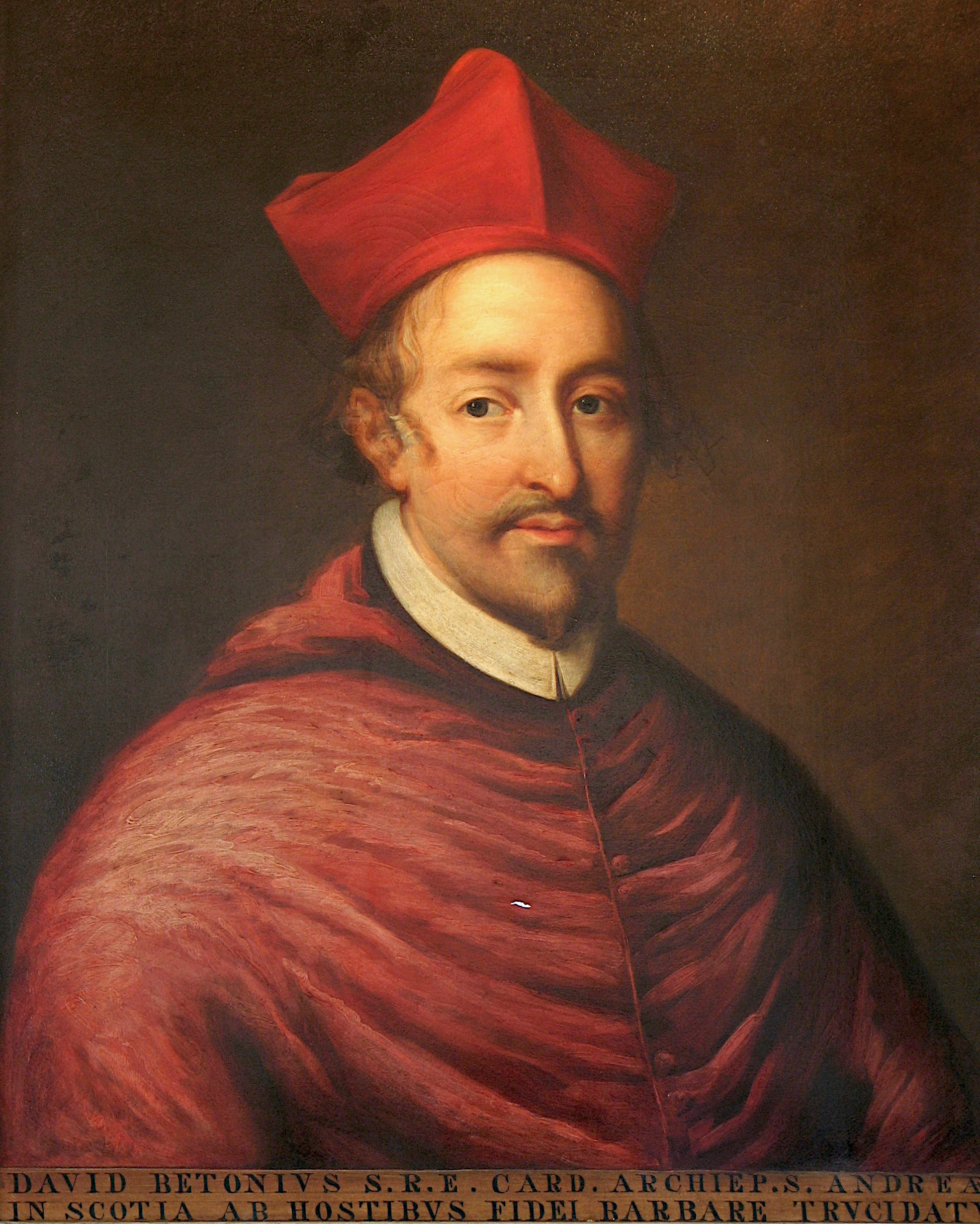
David Beaton (c1494-1546), made a cardinal on 20 December 1538.

1. Juan Álvarez de Toledo
2. Pedro Fernández Manrique
3. Robert de Lénoncourt
4. David Beaton
5. Ippolito II d'Este
6. Pietro Bembo

== 19 December 1539 ==
1. Federigo Fregoso
2. Pierre de La Baume
3. Antoine Sanguin
4. Uberto Gambara
5. Pierpaolo Parisio
6. Marcello Cervini
7. Bartolomeo Guidiccioni
8. Ascanio Parisani
9. Dionisio Laurerio
10. Enrique de Borja y Aragón
11. Giacomo Savelli
12. Miguel da Silva

== 2 June 1542 ==
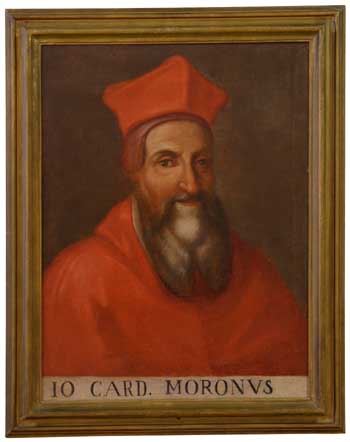
Giovanni Morone (1509-80), made a cardinal on 2 June 1542.

1. Giovanni Morone
2. Marcello Crescenzi
3. Giovanni Vincenzo Acquaviva d'Aragona
4. Pomponio Cecci
5. Roberto Pucci
6. Tommaso Badia
7. Giovanni Andrea Cortese
8. Cristoforo Madruzzo

== 19 December 1544 ==
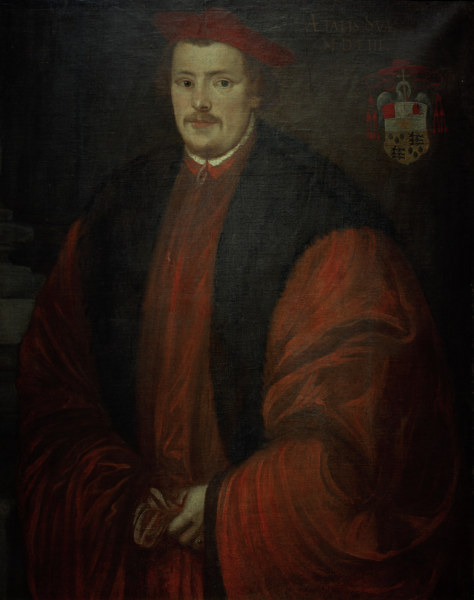
Otto Truchsess von Waldburg (1514-73), made a cardinal on 19 December 1544.

1. Gaspar de Ávalos de la Cueva
2. Francisco Mendoza de Bobadilla
3. Bartolomé de la Cueva y Toledo
4. Georges d'Armagnac
5. Jacques d'Annebaut
6. Otto Truchsess von Waldburg
7. Andrea Cornaro
8. Francesco Sfondrati
9. Federico Cesi
10. Durante Duranti
11. Niccolò Ardinghelli
12. Girolamo Recanati Capodiferro
13. Tiberio Crispo

== 16 December 1545 ==
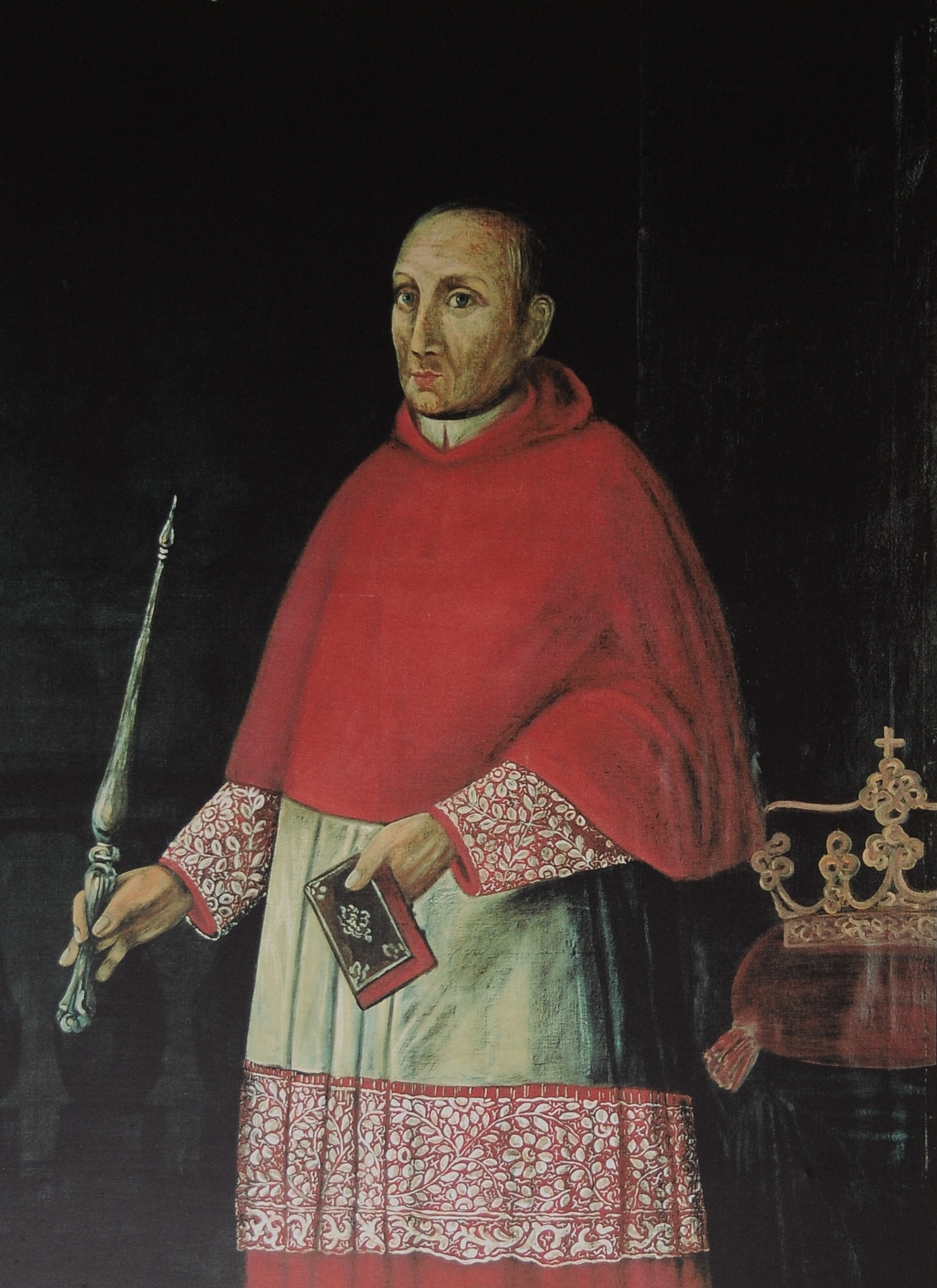
Henry, King of Portugal (1512-80), made a cardinal on 16 December 1545.

1. Pedro Pacheco de Villena
2. Georges II d'Amboise
3. Henrique de Portugal
4. Ranuccio Farnese

== 27 July 1547 ==
1. Charles de Guise
2. Giulio della Rovere

== 9 January 1548 ==
1. Charles de Bourbon-Vendôme

== 8 April 1549 ==
1. Girolamo Verallo
2. Giovanni Angelo de' Medici
3. Filiberto Ferrero
4. Bernardino Maffei

== Additional sources ==
- Jos E. Vercruysse (2000). "DIE KARDINÄLE VON PAUL III". Archivum Historiae Pontificiae (in German). 38: 41–96. JSTOR 23564681.
- Miranda, Salvador. "Consistories for the creation of Cardinals 16th Century (1503-1605): Paul III". The Cardinals of the Holy Roman Church. Florida International University. OCLC 53276621.
