= Picarelli =

Picarelli is an Italian surname. Notable people with the surname include:

- Anna Maria Picarelli (born 1984), American-born Italian women's footballer
- Francesco Picarelli (1631–1708), Italian Roman Catholic bishop
