= Rodrigo Luis de Borja y de Castre-Pinós =

Rodrigo Luis de Borja y de Castre-Pinós (1524–1537) was a Spanish Roman Catholic cardinal. A member of the influential House of Borgia, he inherited the barony of Navarrés at a young age before being elevated to the cardinalate by Pope Paul III in 1536. He died in 1537 at the age of 13, shortly after receiving his red galero hat.

== Biography ==
A member of the House of Borgia, Rodrigo Luis de Borja y de Castre-Pinós was born in Gandía in 1524, the son of Juan de Borja y Enríquez de Luna, 3rd Duke of Gandía, and his second wife Francisca de Castro y de Pinós. He was the half-brother on his father's side of Saint Francis Borgia, 4th Duke of Gandía and of Enrique de Borja y Aragón. He was the great-great-grandson of Pope Alexander VI.

He inherited the barony of Navarrés by cessation of his father on June 8, 1530. He joined the Order of Santiago in 1533.

At a very young age, Pope Paul III created him a cardinal deacon in the consistory of December 22, 1536. He received the deaconry of San Nicola in Carcere on January 15, 1537. He died almost immediately after Francisco Juan Roca, dean of the collegiate church of Gandía arrived with the red hat.

He died in the ducal palace of Gandía on August 6, 1537.
