= San Nicola in Carcere =

- Basilica of Saint Nicholas in Prison
- Basilica di San Nicola in Carcere
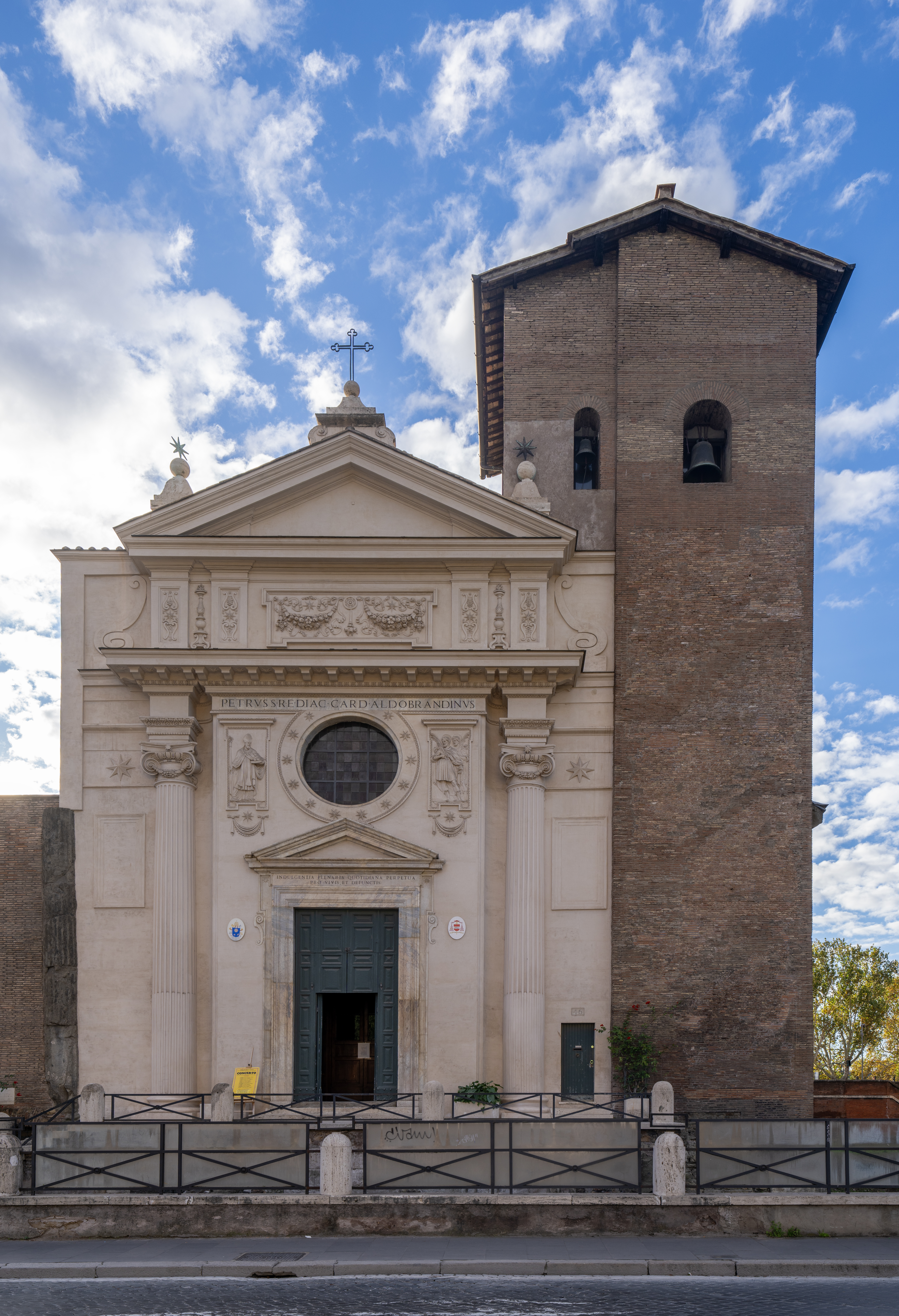
- San Nicola in Carcere.
- Click on the map for a fullscreen view
- 41°53′28″N 12°28′48″E
- Location: Via del Teatro di Marcello 46, Rome
- Country: Italy
- Language: Italian
- Denomination: Catholic
- Tradition: Roman Rite
- Religious institute: Clerics Regular of the Mother of God

History
- Status: titular church minor basilica regional church
- Dedication: Nicholas of Myra

Architecture
- Architect: Giacomo della Porta
- Architectural type: medieval
- Completed: 1599

Administration
- Diocese: Rome

San Nicola in Carcere (Italian, "Saint Nicholas in prison") is an ancient titular church and minor basilica in Rome near the Forum Boarium in rione Ripa. It is constructed in the remains of the three temples of the Forum Holitorium and is one of the traditional stational churches of Lent. The parish was suppressed in 1931 and it is now served by the Clerics Regular of the Mother of God from the nearby Santa Maria in Campitelli.

== History ==
The first church on the site was probably built in the 6th century, and a 10th-century inscription may be seen on a fluted column next to the entrance, but the first definite dedication is from a plaque on the church dating to 1128. The inscriptions found in S. Angelo, a valuable source illustrating the history of the Basilica, have been collected and published by Vincenzo Forcella.

It was constructed in and from the ruins of the Forum Holitorium and its Roman temples, along with a jail (carcer) which a tradition (supported by Pliny's history of Rome) states was sited in the temples' ruins. However, the in Carcere (in jail) part of the name of the church was only changed to "in Carcere Tulliano" in the 14th century, owing to an erroneous identification. The prison was really that of Byzantine times (LPD i.515, n13; ii.295, n12).

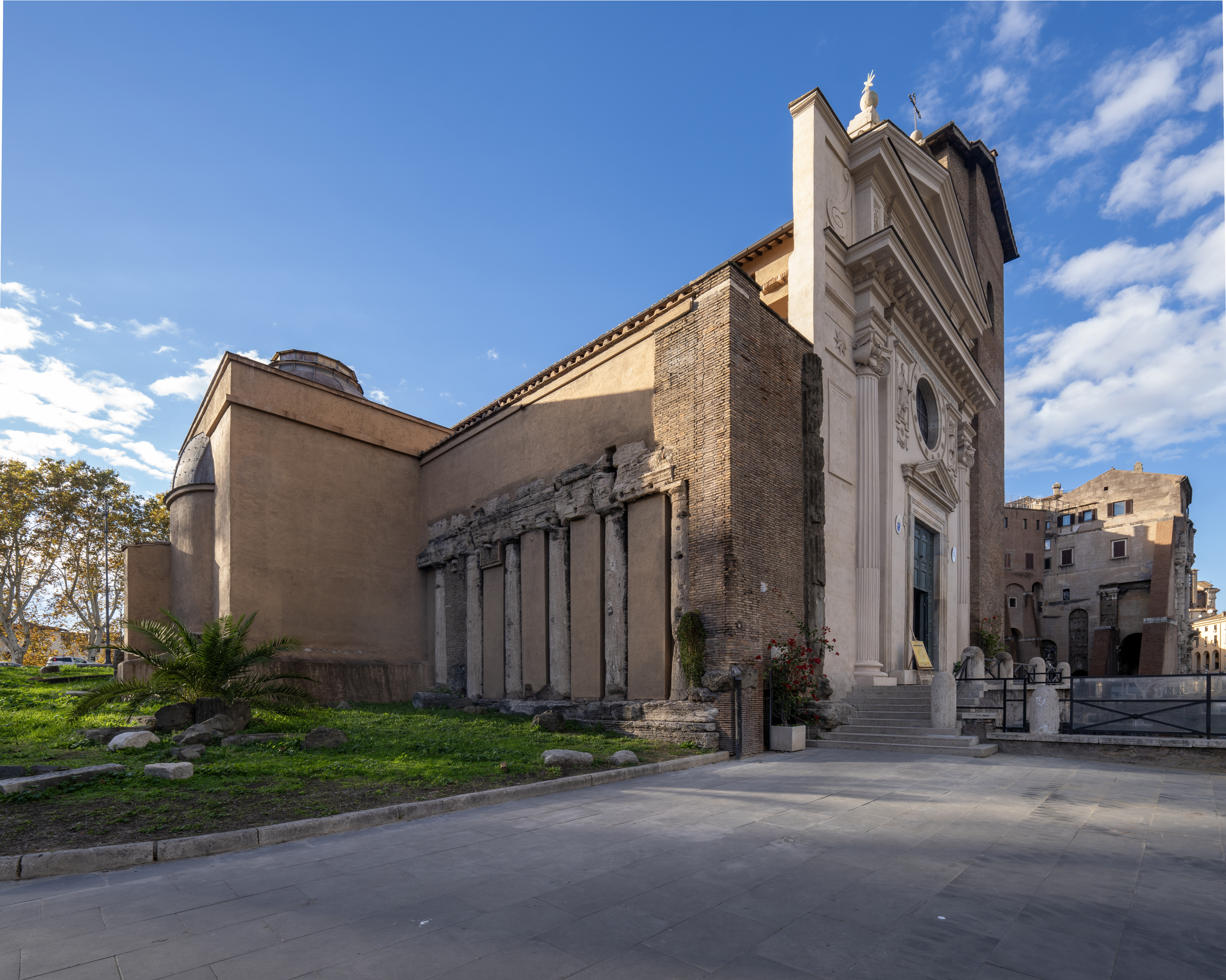
Six columns of the Temple of Spes in the southern wall of the Church.

Spolia from all these ancient remains is still apparent in the church's construction, most particularly three columns from the Temple of Juno Sospita which are incorporated into both the 10th century and 1599 frontal façades of the church. The columns of the Temple of Janus, dedicated by Gaius Duilius after his naval victory at the Battle of Mylae in 260 BC, can still be seen as being incorporated into the northern wall of the church. Six columns from the Temple of Spes are visible in the southern wall.

The dedication to Saint Nicholas was made by the Greek population in the area. In the 11th century, it was known as the church of Petrus Leonis, referring to the converted Jewish family, the Pierleoni, who rebuilt the nearby Theatre of Marcellus as a fortress. One of their members, Pietro Pierleone, was an important cardinal in the 1120s and was elected Pope Anacletus II, though he was later branded a schismatic antipope.

The church was rebuilt in 1599, with a new facade by Giacomo della Porta (though the medieval campanile - originally a fortified tower, then adapted to a bell tower after being abandoned - was not altered). Stairs under the altar lead to the crypt and to the base of the former Roman temples. Beneath the high altar is also an ancient basalt bath tub containing martyrs' relics.

== Present ==
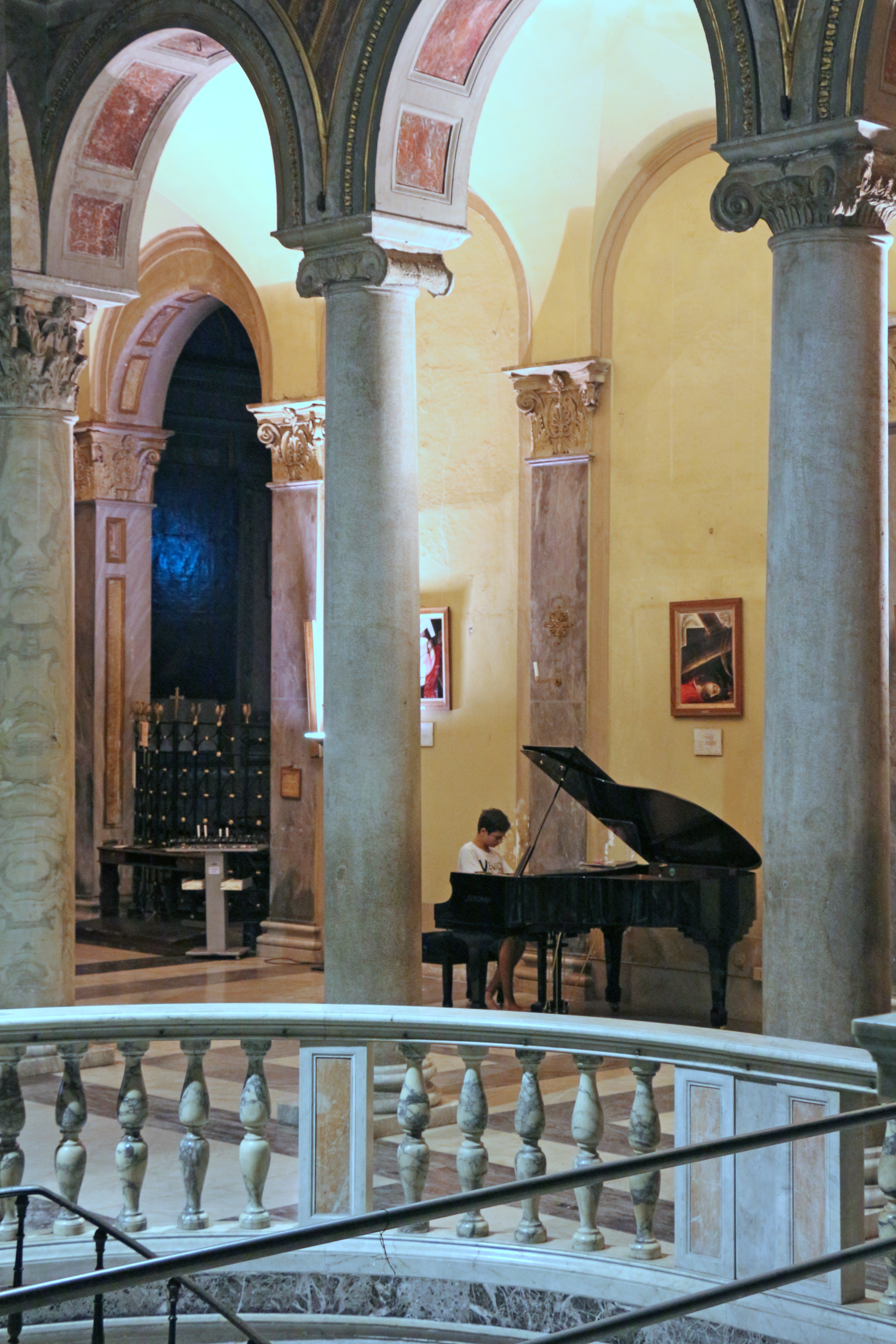
Pianist playing next to the stairs to the Roman ruins

The church is known for Marian celebrations; one is the Italian Our Lady of Pompeii, whose feast is celebrated here, and the other is the Mexican Our Lady of Guadalupe, a reproduction of whose miraculous painting, sent here from Mexico in 1773, is shown.

Nearby structures include:

- Piazza Venezia
- Campidoglio
- Theatre of Marcellus
- Temple of Portunus in the Forum Boarium
- Santa Maria in Cosmedin and the Bocca della Verità

== List of cardinal-deacons ==
- Ottaviano de Monticello (1138–1151)
- Ottone (1152–1174)
- Vibiano (1175)
- Gerardo (1175–1178)
- Bernardo (1178–1181)
- Pietro Diana (1185–1188)
- Egidio Pierleoni (1190–1194)
- Gerard OCist (1198–1199)
- Guido Pierleone (1205–1221)
- Otto of Tonengo (1227–1244)
- Giovanni Gaetano Orsini (1244–1277)
- Guglielmo de Longhi (1294–1319)
  - Giovanni Arlotti (1328), pseudocardinal
- Landolfo Maramaldo (1381–1415)
- Rodrigo Lanzol-Borja y Borja (1456–1484)
- Giovanni Battista Savelli (1484–1498)
- Amanieu d'Albret (1500–1520)
- Agostino Trivulzio, in commendam (1520–1531)
- Íñigo López de Mendoza y Zúñiga (1531–1537)
- Rodrigo Luis de Borja y de Castre-Pinós (1537)
- Girolamo Grimaldi, in commendam (1537–1538)
- Niccolò Caetani di Sermoneta (1538–1552)
- Giacomo Savelli (1552–1558)
- Giovanni Battista Consiglieri (1558–1559)
- Carlo Carafa (1560–1561)
- Francesco II Gonzaga (1561–1562)
- Georges d'Armagnac (1562–1585)
- Francesco Sforza (1585–1588)
- Ascanio Colonna (1588–1591)
- Federico Borromeo (1591–1593)
- Pietro Aldobrandini (1593–1604)
- Carlo Emmanuele Pio di Savoia (1604–1623)
- Carlo di Ferdinando de' Medici (1623–1644)
- Giangiacomo Teodoro Trivulzio (1644)
- Rinaldo d'Este (1644–1668)
- Friedrich von Hessen-Darmstadt (1668–1670)
- Paolo Savelli (1670–1678)
- Urbano Sacchetti (1681–1689)
- Gianfrancesco Ginetti (1689–1691)
- vacant (1691–1699)
- Henri Albert de La Grange d'Arquien (1699–1707)
- Lorenzo Altieri (1707–1718)
- Damian Hugo Philipp Reichsgraf von Schönborn-Buchheim (1721)
- vacant (1721–1728)
- Antonio Banchieri (1728–1733)
- vacant (1733–1738)
- Carlo Della Torre di Rezzonico (1738–1747)
- Mario Bolognetti (1747–1751)
- Domenico Orsini d'Aragona (1751–1763)
- vacant (1763–1770)
- Giovanni Battista Rezzonico (1770–1783)
- Romoaldo Braschi-Onesti (1787–1800)
- Marino Carafa di Belvedere (1801–1807)
- vacant (1807–1816)
- Pietro Vidoni (1816–1830)
- vacant (1830–1834)
- Nicola Grimaldi (1834–1845)
- Giuseppe Antonio Zacchia Rondinini (1845)
- Pietro Marini (1847–1863)
- vacant (1863–1874)
- Camillo Tarquini SJ (1874)
- Domenico Bartolini (1875–1876)
- Joseph Hergenröther (1879–1888)
- vacant (1888–1907)
- Gaetano De Lai (1907–1911)
- vacant (1911–1922)
- Giuseppe Mori (1922–1933) pro hac vice (1934)
- Nicola Canali (1935–1961)
- vacant (1961–1967)
- Patrick Aloysius O'Boyle pro hac vice (1967–1987)
- Hans Urs von Balthasar SJ (1988)
- vacant (1988–1994)
- Alois Grillmeier SJ (1994–1998)
- Zenon Grocholewski (2001–2020)
- Silvano Maria Tomasi (2020–present)

== Bibliography ==
- Andreina Palombi, La basilica di San Nicola in Carcere: il complesso architettonico dei tre templi del Foro Olitorio (Roma: Istituto nazionale di studi romani, 2006).
- Franco Astolfi, I templi di San Nicola in Carcere (Roma : E.S.S. Editorial Service System, 1999). [Forma Urbis, 5. 1999, Supplemento].
- S. Nicola in Carcere (Roma : Istituto nazionale di studi romani, 1991). [no author]
- Giovanni Battista Proja, San Nicola in Carcere (Roma: Istituto di Studi Romani, 1981). [in Italian]
- Vincenzo Golzio, San Nicola in Carcere e i tre templi del Foro Olitorio (Roma: Libreria Fratelli Treves dell'Anonima Libraria Italiana, 1928). [in Italian]

Preceded by Santi Nereo e Achilleo	Landmarks of Rome; San Nicola in Carcere	Succeeded by San Pancrazio
