= Cassius of Narni =

6th-century Italian bishop and saint

Saint Cassius of Narni

Bishop
- Died: 558; Rome
- Venerated in: Catholic Church, Eastern Orthodox Church, True Orthodox Church
- Feast: June 29

Saint Cassius was a bishop of Narni in Umbria from 537 to 558, the date of his death. He was praised by St. Gregory the Great, and was noted for his charity.

Cassius would offer Mass daily at the tomb of his predecessor Saint Juvenal of Narni, on whom he tried to pattern himself. On the feast of SS. Peter and Paul, on the occasion of which he used to go every year to Rome, after having celebrated the holy mysteries in his city and having distributed communion to all, he died.

His wife's name was Fausta.

In the year 878, Cassius' relics were taken to Basilica di San Frediano in Lucca with those of Saints Juvenal and Cassius' wife Fausta. They were taken by Adalbert, Margrave of Tuscany, but all of the relics were returned to Narni two years later. The relics of Saint Cassius were built in a restored shrine later known as the Sacello di San Cassio. Juvenal's relics are said to have been hidden.
