= Taddeo Luigi dal Verme =

Italian cardinal (1641-1717)

- Cardinal-Priest of Sant'Alessio
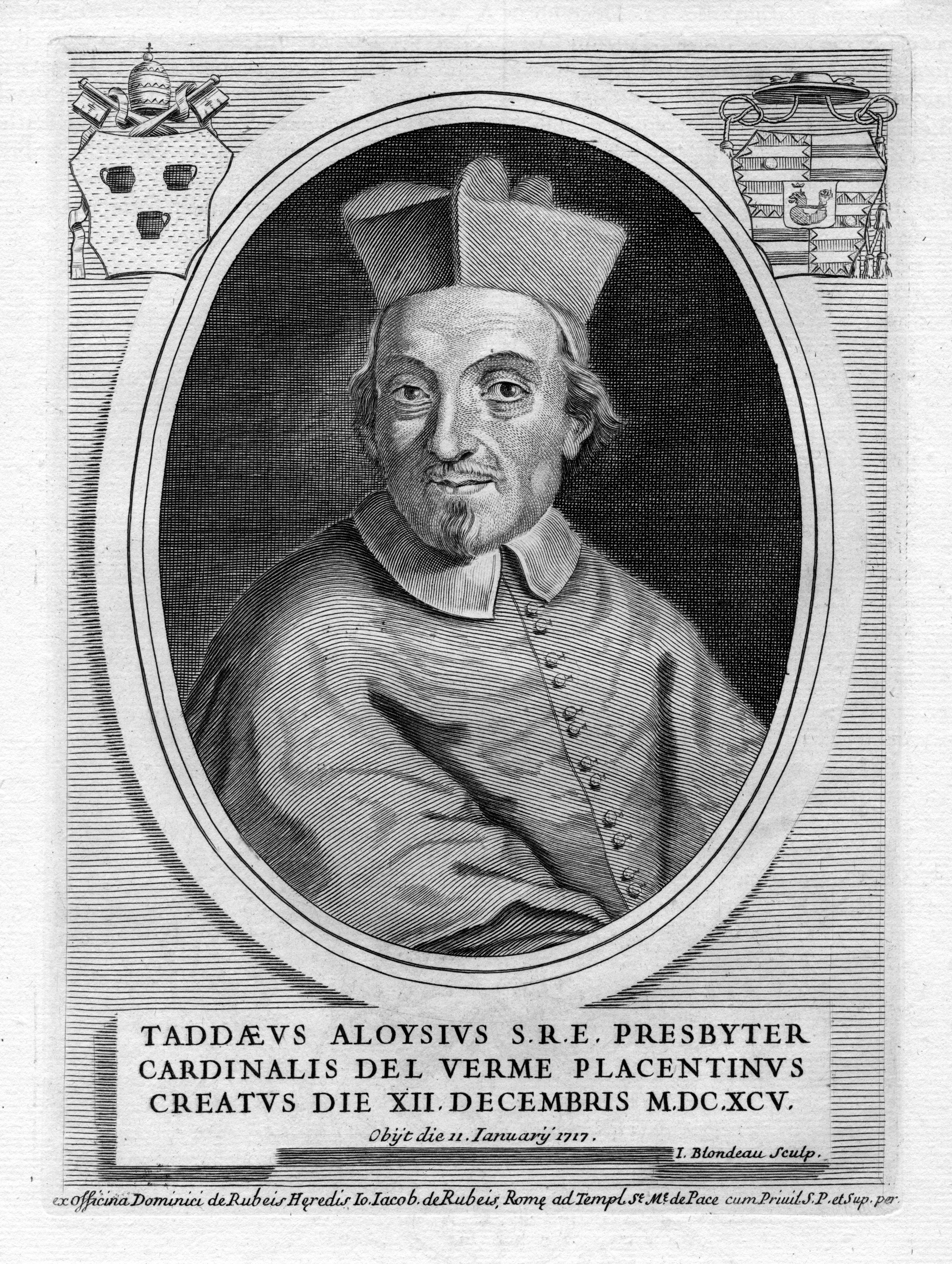
- Church: Catholic Church

Orders
- Consecration: 2 January 1689

Personal details
- Born: 16 February 1641 Piacenza, Italy
- Died: 12 January 1717 (aged 75)

Taddeo Luigi dal Verme (1641–1717) was a Roman Catholic cardinal.

== Biography ==
He was born in Piacenza on 16 February 1641 and was baptized the following day. He was the son of Giovanni Maria Dal Verme, count of Sanguinetto, and of Ottavia Meli-Lupi, marquise of Soragna. He was also the nephew of Cardinal Savo Millini and was related to cardinals Girolamo Farnese and Mario Alberizzi.

After attending La Sapienza University of Rome, he obtained his doctorate in in utroque iure on 26 January 1688. He was already receiving the tonsure in 1650 when he was just nine years old, and he had renounced his birthright in 1664 with the intention of becoming a priest. He went to Rome that same year and accompanied Mario Alberizzi, apostolic nuncio to Vienna, as secretary.

Ordained a priest, he became prefect of the episcopal palace of Fano. Despite having declined the episcopal promotion several times to the headquarters of the same city that had been repeatedly proposed by the Duke of Parma, he could not oppose the wishes of Pope Innocent XI who forced him to take possession of that episcopal see, electing him on 20 December 1688.

Created cardinal presbyter in the consistory court of 12 December 1695, he received a special dispensation to this office since he had his uncle in the Sacred College of Cardinals. On 2 January 1696, he received the purple and the title of Sant'Alessio. Transferred to the Imola site from that same date, he participated in the 1700 conclave that elected Pope Clement XI.

He was promoted to the bishopric of Ferrara on 14 March 1702.

He died in the city on 12 January 1717. He was exposed to public veneration in the Ferrara cathedral and buried together with the other bishops of that seat.

== Episcopal genealogy ==
- Cardinal Francesco Maria Macchiavelli
- Pope Innocent XI
- Cardinal Taddeo Luigi dal Verme

== Bibliography ==
- Historical-ecclesiastical erudition dictionary from San Pietro to the present day by Gaetano Moroni, 1879, Venice, Tip. Emiliana
- Biographical Dictionary of Italians by Alberto Maria Ghisalberti, Massimiliano Pavan, Institute of the Italian Encyclopedia - 1960, Milan

Catholic Church titles
Preceded by Angelo Maria Ranuzzi	Bishop of Fano; 1688–1696	Succeeded by Giovanni Battista Giberti
Preceded by Costanzo Zani	Bishop of Imola; 1696–1701	Succeeded by Filippo Antonio Gualtieri
Preceded by Federico Visconti	Cardinal-Priest of Sant'Alessio; 1696–1717	Succeeded by Giberto Bartolomeo Borromeo
Preceded by Fabrizio Paolucci	Bishop of Ferrara; 1701–1717	Succeeded by Tommaso Ruffo
