= Paolo Isaresi della Mirandola =

Roman Catholic Bishop of Squillace (1601-1602)

Most Reverend Paolo Isaresi della Mirandola
- Bishop of Squillace
- Church: Catholic Church
- Diocese: Diocese of Squillace
- In office: 1601–1602
- Predecessor: Tommaso Sirleto
- Successor: Fabrizio Sirleto

Orders
- Consecration: 9 September 1601 by Girolamo Bernerio

Personal details
- Died: 1602 Squillace, Italy

Paolo Isaresi della Mirandola, O.P. (Born to Mirandola, 1550 and died 1602 to Squillace) was a Roman Catholic prelate who served as Bishop of Squillace (1601–1602).

== Biography ==
Paolo Isaresi della Mirandola was ordained a priest in the Order of Preachers. On 13 August 1601, he was appointed during the papacy of Pope Clement VIII as Bishop of Squillace. On 9 September 1601, he was consecrated bishop by Girolamo Bernerio, Bishop of Ascoli Piceno, with Aurelio Novarini, Archbishop of Dubrovnik, and Agostino Quinzio, Bishop of Korčula, serving as co-consecrators. He served as Bishop of Squillace until his death in 1602.

== External links and additional sources ==
- Cheney, David M. "Diocese of Squillace". Catholic-Hierarchy.org. (for Chronology of Bishops) ^{[self-published]}
- Chow, Gabriel. "Diocese of Squillace (Italy)". GCatholic.org. (for Chronology of Bishops) ^{[self-published]}

Catholic Church titles
Preceded by Tommaso Sirleto	Bishop of Squillace; 1601–1602	Succeeded by Fabrizio Sirleto
