= Lodovico Saffiro =

Most Reverend Lodovico Saffiro
- Bishop of Squillace
- Church: Catholic Church
- Diocese: Diocese of Squillace
- In office: 1635
- Predecessor: Fabrizio Sirleto
- Successor: Giuseppe della Corgna

Orders
- Consecration: 21 September 1635 by Giulio Cesare Sacchetti

Personal details
- Died: November 1635 Squillace, Italy

Lodovico Saffiro (died November 1635) was a Roman Catholic prelate who served as Bishop of Squillace (1635).

== Biography ==
On 17 September 1635, Lodovico Saffiro was appointed during the papacy of Pope Urban VIII as Bishop of Squillace. On 21 September 1635, he was consecrated bishop by Giulio Cesare Sacchetti, Cardinal-Priest of Santa Susanna. He served as Bishop of Squillace until his death in November 1635.

== External links and additional sources ==
- Cheney, David M. "Diocese of Squillace". Catholic-Hierarchy.org. (for Chronology of Bishops) ^{[self-published]}
- Chow, Gabriel. "Diocese of Squillace (Italy)". GCatholic.org. (for Chronology of Bishops) ^{[self-published]}

Catholic Church titles
Preceded by Fabrizio Sirleto	Bishop of Squillace; 1635	Succeeded by Giuseppe della Corgna
