= Girolamo Orsaja =

Most Reverend Girolamo Orsaja
- Archbishop of Rossano
- Church: Catholic Church
- Diocese: Archdiocese of Rossano
- In office: 1676–1683
- Predecessor: Angelo della Noca
- Successor: Girolamo Compagnone

Orders
- Consecration: 1 March 1676 by Bernardino Rocci

Personal details
- Died: 13 June 1683 Rossano, Italy

Girolamo Orsaja, O.M. (died 1683) was a Roman Catholic prelate who served as Archbishop of Rossano (1676–1683).

== Biography ==
Girolamo Orsaja was ordained a priest in the Order of Minims. On 24 February 1676, he was appointed during the papacy of Pope Clement X as Archbishop of Rossano. On 1 March 1676, he was consecrated bishop by Bernardino Rocci, Bishop of Orvieto, with Francesco de' Marini, Titular Archbishop of Amasea, and Giuseppe Eusanio, Titular Bishop of Porphyreon, serving as co-consecrators. He served as Archbishop of Rossano until his death on 13 June 1683.

== External links and additional sources ==
- Cheney, David M. "Archdiocese of Rossano-Cariati". Catholic-Hierarchy.org. (for Chronology of Bishops)
- Chow, Gabriel. "Archdiocese of Rossano-Cariati (Italy)". GCatholic.org. (for Chronology of Bishops)

Catholic Church titles
Preceded by Angelo della Noca	Archbishop of Rossano; 1676–1683	Succeeded by Girolamo Compagnone

Minims (religious order)
