= Alfonso de Aloysio =

Roman Catholic bishop

Most Reverend Alfonso de Aloysio
- Bishop of Squillace
- Church: Catholic Church
- Diocese: Diocese of Squillace
- In office: 1688–1694
- Predecessor: Paolo Filocamo (bishop)
- Successor: Gennaro Crespino

Orders
- Ordination: 3 May 1678
- Consecration: 13 June 1688 by Fabrizio Spada

Personal details
- Born: 4 January 1644 Montelparo, Papal States
- Died: May 1694 (aged 50) Squillace, Kingdom of Naples

Alfonso de Aloysio (1644–1694) was a Roman Catholic prelate who served as Bishop of Squillace (1688–1694).

== Biography ==
Alfonso de Aloysio was born in Montelparo, Italy on 4 January 1644 and ordained a priest on 3 May 1678. On 31 May 1688, he was appointed during the papacy of Pope Innocent XI as Bishop of Squillace. On 13 June 1688, he was consecrated bishop by Fabrizio Spada, Cardinal-Priest of San Callisto with Pier Antonio Capobianco, Bishop Emeritus of Lacedonia, and Costanzo Zani, Bishop of Imola, serving as co-consecrators. He served as Bishop of Squillace until his death in May 1694.

== External links and additional sources ==
- Cheney, David M. "Diocese of Squillace". Catholic-Hierarchy.org. (for Chronology of Bishops) ^{[self-published]}
- Chow, Gabriel. "Diocese of Squillace (Italy)". GCatholic.org. (for Chronology of Bishops) ^{[self-published]}

Catholic Church titles
Preceded by Paolo Filocamo (bishop)	Bishop of Squillace; 1688–1694	Succeeded by Gennaro Crespino
