= Giuseppe Mori =

Italian cardinal

His Eminence Giuseppe Mori
- Secretary Emeritus of the Congregation of the Council
- Church: Roman Catholic Church
- Appointed: 8 December 1916
- Term ended: 11 December 1922
- Predecessor: Oreste Giorgi
- Successor: Bernardo Colombo
- Other post: Cardinal-Priest of San Nicola in Cacere pro hac vice (1933-1934)
- Previous posts: Undersecretary of the Congregation of the Sacraments (1908-16); Prelate Auditor of the Roman Rota (1909-22); Cardinal-Deacon of San Nicola in Cacere (1922-33)

Orders
- Ordination: 17 September 1874
- Created cardinal: 11 December 1922 by Pope Pius XI
- Rank: Cardinal-deacon (1922-1933); Cardinal-priest (1933-1934)

Personal details
- Born: Giuseppe Mori; 24 January 1850 Loro Piceno, Fermo, Papal States
- Died: 30 September 1934 (aged 84) Loro Piceno, Fermo, Kingdom of Italy
- Education: Pontifical Roman Seminary
- Motto: Ave crux spes unica

Styles of Giuseppe Mori
- Reference style: His Eminence
- Spoken style: Your Eminence
- Informal style: Cardinal
- See: none

Giuseppe Mori (24 January 1850 — 30 September 1934) was an Italian cardinal of the Roman Catholic Church. He served as secretary of the Sacred Congregation of the Council from 1916 until his death, and was elevated to the cardinalate in 1922.

His motto was "Ave crux spes unica" ("Hail the cross, our only hope").

== Biography ==
Born in Loro Piceno, Mori studied at the seminary in Fermo and the Pontifical Roman Seminary. He was ordained to the priesthood on 17 September 1874, and then did pastoral work in Rome until 1880. Mori was raised to the rank of honorary chamberlain of his holiness on 4 October 1880, and served as a staff member (1885–1903) and the auditor (1903–1908) of the Sacred Congregation of the Council in the Roman Curia.

He later became undersecretary of the Sacred Congregation for the Discipline of the Sacraments on 20 October 1908, auditor of the Roman Rota on 9 February 1909, and secretary of the Sacred Congregation of the Council on 8 December 1916. As secretary of the council, Mori served as the second-highest official of that dicastery successively under Cardinals Francesco di Paola Cassetta, Donato Sbarretti, and Giulio Serafini.

Pope Pius XI created him Cardinal-Deacon of San Nicola in Carcere in the consistory of 11 December 1922. Mori chose to be elevated to a cardinal-priest (retaining the same titular church) after ten years' standing as a cardinal-deacon on 13 March 1933. He also served as a judge of the Apostolic Signatura and sat on the committee appointed to rule the Church during the sede vacante.

Mori died from heart disease in his native Loro Piceno, at age 84. He was buried in the chapel of the Loro Piceno cemetery, and his remains were later transferred to his family's tomb.

Catholic Church titles
Preceded by Oreste Giorgi	Secretary of the Sacred Congregation of the Council; 1916–1934	Succeeded by Bernardo Colombo
