= Juvenal of Narni =

Italian bishop

Saint Juvenal of Narni
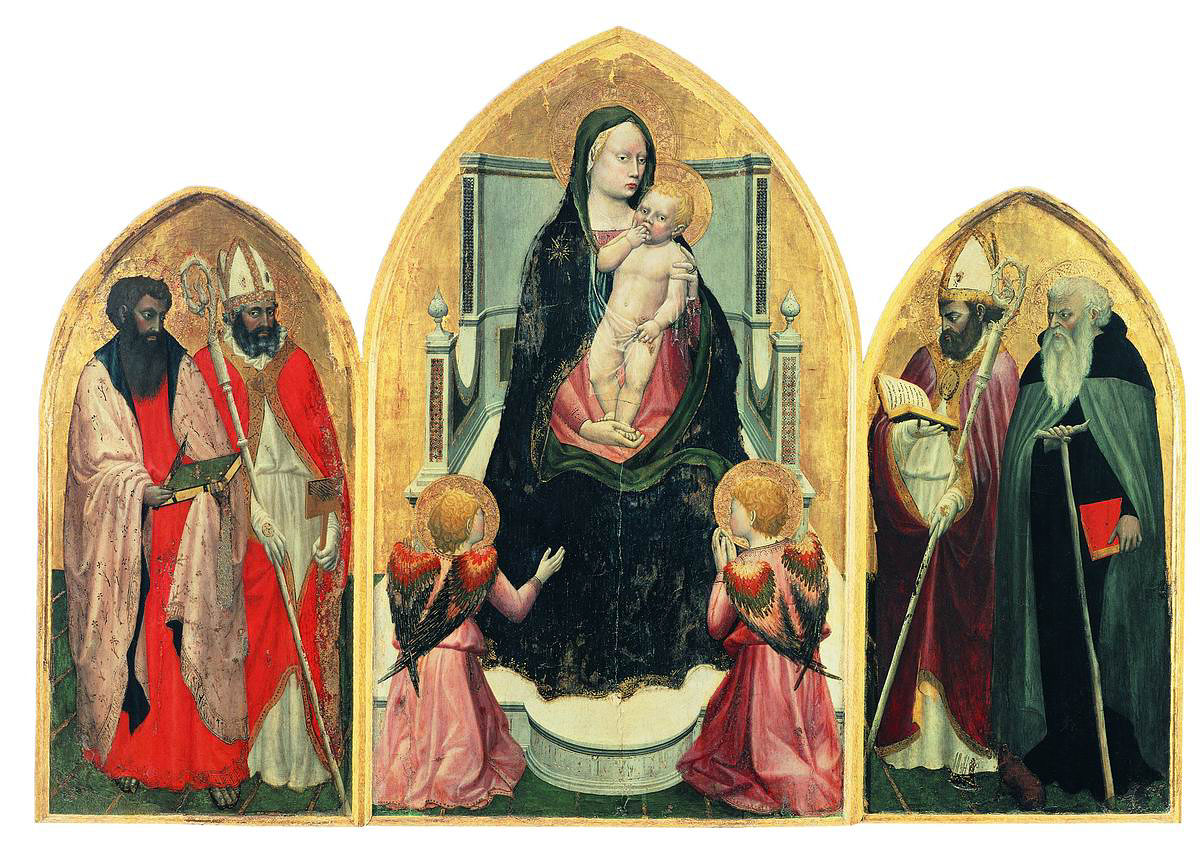
- The San Giovenale Triptych The right panel depicts St. Anthony and St. Juvenal. [Masaccio Museum of Sacred Art, Cascia di Reggello (Florence, Italy)].

Bishop and Confessor
- Died: May 3, 369 or 377; Narni, Umbria, Italy
- Venerated in: Catholic Church; Eastern Orthodox Church
- Major shrine: cathedral of Narni
- Feast: May 3
- Attributes: Holding a sword in his mouth; holding a chalice
- Patronage: Narni; Fossano; Chia

Saint Juvenal (d. May 3, 369 or 377) (Italian: San Giovenale di Narni) is venerated as the first Bishop of Narni in Umbria. Historical details regarding Juvenal's life are limited. A biography of Juvenal of little historical value, written after the seventh century, states that Juvenal was born in Africa, was ordained by Pope Damasus I, was the first bishop of Narni, and was buried in the Porta Superiore on the Via Flaminia on August 7, though his feast day was celebrated on May 3. This Vita does not call him a martyr but calls him a confessor. The martyrologies of Florus of Lyon and Ado describe Juvenal as a bishop and confessor rather than as a martyr.

Saint Gregory the Great, in his Dialogues (IV, 12) and Homiliae in Evangelium, speaks of a bishop of Narni named Juvenal, and describes him as a martyr. The title of martyr, though, was sometimes given to bishops who did not necessarily die for their faith. Gregory also mentions a sepulcher associated with Juvenal at Narni.

== Veneration ==
The Gelasian Sacramentary has a prayer in honor of the saint under May 3. The Codex Bernense of the Martyrologium Hieronymianum records his name under May 3 with those of three martyrs of the Via Nomentana: Eventius, Alexander I, and Theodulus.

Saint Juvenal appears, not as a martyr, but as a bishop and confessor, in the Tridentine calendar, which allots him a commemoration shared with these three martyrs within the feast of the Finding of the Cross on May 3. When this feast was abolished in 1960, the four saints continued to be merely commemorated jointly within the celebration of the weekday. The same day continues to be Saint Juvenal's feast day, as indicated in the Roman Martyrology, but since 1969, he is no longer included in the General Roman Calendar.

His legend suggests that he saved Narni from both Ligurian and Sarmatian invaders by calling down a divine thunderstorm.

The construction of Juvenal's sepulcher in Narni is attributed to his alleged successor, St. Maximus (d. 416 AD). The author of the Life of Pope Vigilius (sixth century) in the Liber Pontificalis states that a monastery founded by Belisarius near Orte was dedicated to Juvenal. In 878, Juvenal's relics were taken to the Basilica di San Frediano in Lucca with those of Saints Cassius and Cassius' wife Fausta by Adalbert, Margrave of Tuscany, but all of the relics were returned to Narni two years later. The relics of Saint Cassius were built in a restored shrine later known as the Sacello di San Cassio. Juvenal's relics are said to have been hidden.

Fossano claims Juvenal as a patron and also claims to hold some of his relics, though these may belong to another saint of the same name.
