= Giovanni Battista Consiglieri =

Giovanni Battista Consiglieri (1491–1559) was an Italian Roman Catholic bishop and cardinal.

== Biography ==
Giovanni Battista Consiglieri was born in Rome in 1491, the son of Baldassare Consiglieri and Mariana de Statis. He studied literature, Ancient Greek, and Latin. As a young man, he married and had two daughters.

He entered the church after his wife's death and became a protonotary apostolic, rising to be President of the Apostolic Signatura.

Pope Paul IV made him a cardinal deacon in the consistory of 15 March 1557. He received the red hat and deaconry of Santa Lucia in Septisolio on 24 March 1557. On 16 December 1558 he opted for the deaconry of San Nicola in Carcere.

He died in Rome on 25 August 1559, during the sede vacante. He was buried in his deaconry.

== See also ==
- Catholic Church in Italy
