= Pietro Marini =

Catholic cardinal

His Eminence Pietro Marini
- Prefect of the Apostolic Signatura
- Church: Roman Catholic Church
- Appointed: 3 February 1858
- Term ended: 19 August 1863
- Predecessor: Mario Mattei
- Successor: Camillo di Pietro
- Other post: Cardinal-Deacon of San Nicola in Carcere (1847-63)
- Previous post: Vice-Camerlengo of the Apostolic Camera (1845-46)

Orders
- Ordination: 27 May 1844
- Created cardinal: 21 December 1846 by Pope Pius IX
- Rank: Cardinal-Deacon

Personal details
- Born: Pietro Marini; 5 October 1794 Rome, Papal States
- Died: 19 August 1863 (aged 68) Rome, Papal States
- Buried: San Nicola in Carcere
- Parents: Francesco Saverio Marini; Irene De Dominicis
- Education: La Sapienza University
- Motto: Ne quid nimis
- Coat of arms

Pietro Marini (5 October 1794 - 19 August 1863) was a Catholic cardinal.

== Biography ==
Pietro Marini was born in 1794 in Rome, in what was then the Papal States. He was the son of Neapolitan architect Francesco Saverio Marini and Irene De Dominicis. Marini was baptised in the patriarchal Vatican basilica in 1794; his godfather was Cardinal Gregorio Barnaba Chiaramonti, O.S.B.Cas., the future Pope Pius VII. Marini is an ancestor of Cardinal Niccolò Marini.

Marini studied letters and philosophy at the Pontifical Roman Seminary from 1804 to 1810; then, at La Sapienza University, Rome, obtaining a doctorate ad honorem in utroque iure (both canon and civil law) on 24 July 1816. He also obtained the title of advocate at the Roman Curia.

Marini served as a civil assessor of the province of Romagna from 1817 to 1820, before being named patrician of Ravenna by the city in 1820. He received the ecclesiastical tonsure in 1821. After this, he became referendary of the Tribunals of the Apostolic Signatura of Justice and of Grace on 9 September 1821. He was created Domestic prelate of His Holiness. From March 1822, he served as a relator of the Sacred Congregation of the Good Government. He was also a member of the Congregation of the Fabric of Saint Peter's Basilica. He served as auditor of Cardinal Camerlengo Bartolomeo Pacca from 1823 to 1824. He was an honorary member of the literary Academy of San Luca from 1824, a voting member of the Tribunal of the Apostolic Signature of Justice, 1824-1825, an Auditor of the Apostolic Chamber, and Auditor of the Sacred Roman Rota (8 October 1826). He was appointed governor of Rome, vice-camerlengo of the Holy Roman Church and director general of police on 22 April 1845, serving until 21 December 1846.

He was ordained to the priesthood on 27 May 1844. On 21 December 1846, he was made a Cardinal-Deacon, receiving the galero on 23 December 1846 and being given the deaconary of San Nicola in Carcere on 12 April 1847. His cardinalitial motto was Ne quid nimis. Cardinal Marini served as apostolic legate in the province of Forlì (29 October 1847), Prefect of the economy of the Sacred Congregation of Propaganda Fide and president of the Camera degli Spoglie (18 March 1852), Protector of the city of Urbino (5 June 1852), Protector of the city of Forlimpopoli (9 June 1856), Prefect of the Tribunal of the Signature of Justice (3 February 1858), Protector of the city of Fabriano (4 December 1858). He resided in the Collegio San Carlo ai Catinari.

He died on 19 August 1863 in Rome. After lying in state in the church of San Carlo ai Catinari, the funeral took place on 24 August 1863, with Pope Pius IX participating. He is buried in his deaconry of San Nicola in Carcere.
