= Lorenzo Kreutter de Corvinis =

Italian Roman Catholic prelate

Most Reverend Lorenzo Kreutter de Corvinis
- Bishop of Vieste
- Church: Catholic Church
- Diocese: Diocese of Vieste
- In office: 1697–1701
- Predecessor: Francesco Antonio Volturale
- Successor: Giovanni Antonio Ruggiero

Orders
- Consecration: 24 November 1697

Personal details
- Born: 4 December 1658 Rome, Italy
- Died: 14 July 1701 (age 42) Vieste, Italy

Lorenzo Kreutter de Corvinis, O.S.B. (1658–1701) was a Roman Catholic prelate who served as Bishop of Vieste (1697–1701).

== Biography ==
Lorenzo Kreutter de Corvinis was born in Rome, Italy on 4 December 1658 and ordained a priest in the Order of Saint Benedict. On 20 November 1697, he was appointed during the papacy of Pope Innocent XII as Bishop of Vieste. On 24 November 1697, he was consecrated bishop by Pier Matteo Petrucci, Cardinal-Priest of San Marcello, with Prospero Bottini, Titular Archbishop of Myra, and Giuseppe Felice Barlacci, Bishop Emeritus of Narni, serving as co-consecrators. He served as Bishop of Vieste until his death on 14 July 1701.

== External links and additional sources ==
- Cheney, David M. "Diocese of Vieste". Catholic-Hierarchy.org. (for Chronology of Bishops) ^{[self-published]}
- Chow, Gabriel. "Diocese of Vieste (Italy)". GCatholic.org. (for Chronology of Bishops) ^{[self-published]}

Catholic Church titles
Preceded by Francesco Antonio Volturale	Bishop of Vieste; 1697–1701	Succeeded by Giovanni Antonio Ruggiero
