= Kreuter =

Kreuter is a German surname.

- Chad Kreuter, American baseball catcher and manager
- Franz Jakob Kreuter (1813-1889), German architect and civil engineer
- Frauke Kreuter, German sociologist and statistician
- Helga Kreuter-Eggemann (1914 - 1970), German art historian involved in looting art in France during WWII

== See also ==
- Kräuter
- Kreuther
- Kreuter Manufacturing Company
