= Francesco Picarelli =

Italian Roman Catholic prelate (1631–1708)

Most Reverend Francesco Picarelli
- Bishop of Narni
- Church: Catholic Church
- Diocese: Diocese of Narni
- In office: 1690–1708
- Predecessor: Giuseppe Felice Barlacci
- Successor: Francesco Saverio Guicciardi

Orders
- Ordination: 24 March 1674
- Consecration: 4 June 1690 by Fabrizio Spada

Personal details
- Born: 3 March 1631 Sarnano, Italy
- Died: December 1708 (age 77) Narni, Italy

Francesco Picarelli (3 March 1631 – December 1708) was a Roman Catholic prelate who served as Bishop of Narni (1690–1708).

== Biography ==
Francesco Picarelli was born in Sarnano, Italy on 3 March 1631. He was ordained a deacon on 10 March 1674 and ordained a priest on 24 March 1674. On 22 May 1690, he was appointed during the papacy of Pope Alexander VIII as Bishop of Narni. On 4 June 1690, he was consecrated bishop by Fabrizio Spada, Cardinal-Priest of San Crisogono with Francesco Martelli, Titular Archbishop of Corinthus, with Victor Augustinus Ripa, Bishop of Vercelli, serving as co-consecrators. He served as Bishop of Narni until his death in December 1708.

== External links and additional sources ==
- Cheney, David M. "Diocese of Narni". Catholic-Hierarchy.org. (Chronology of Bishops) ^{[self-published]}
- Chow, Gabriel. "Diocese of Narni (Italy)". GCatholic.org. Archived from the original on February 4, 2014. (Chronology of Bishops) ^{[self-published]}

Catholic Church titles
Preceded by Giuseppe Felice Barlacci	Bishop of Narni; 1690–1708	Succeeded by Francesco Saverio Guicciardi
