= Neil C. Krauter =

- Born: February 18, 1957 (age 68); United States
- Education: Franklin & Marshall College
- Occupation: Insurance executive
- Known for: Owns the insurance broker Krauter & Company
- Spouse: Ellie Marvin Krauter (married 2020–present)

Neil Clark Krauter (born 1957) is an American commercial insurance industry executive who is the founder of Krauter & Company.

== Early life and education ==
Krauter was born in 1957. He earned a B.A. in economics from Franklin & Marshall College.

== Career ==
Krauter worked at Lloyd's of London, then Marsh & McLennan, and then at Aon Corporation. During the 9/11 attacks, over one thousand Aon employees worked in the South Tower, but "the vast majority" of employees survived the attack, according to MarketWatch. At age 40, he retired and bought a wine store and spent time with his young family.

In 2004–2005, many commercial insurance firms came under fire from New York State Attorney General Eliot Spitzer, who launched a crusade against the industry for insurance firms' presumed conflict of interest payments to brokers known as contingent commissions. Krauter came out of retirement and launched his own self-financed firm known as Krauter & Company in 2004. The firm added nine offices in 11 years, including an office in Houston, Chicago, and Los Angeles.

The firm handles D&O insurance, which is liability insurance payable to a firm's directors and officers if there's damage from a lawsuit for alleged wrongful acts while being in charge. The firm also does property, safety and loss control insurance, including "coverage for private equity firms" as well as "complex risk programs." By 2010, there were nine offices across the United States. In 2008, when AIG was offering steep discounts to clients, he commented in Insurance News Net that AIG was not "looking to do ridiculously stupid deals" but that cuts on the casualty business offered by AIG were around 10%. In 2009, with the economic downturn and actions by state regulators, he felt clients were "reaching a point of intolerance".

In 2014, Krauter & Company earned a spot as one of Inc. Magazine's 5000 fastest-growing private companies in America. In July 2014, Krauter launched the networking group, Private Equity Principal Group (PEPG) which has currently over 130 members.

In 2019, he sold Krauter and company to Risk Strategies and joined their executive committee.

== Personal life ==
Krauter lives in the community of Port Royal in Naples Florida. Krauter has undertaken several expeditions, including a cross-country ski journey from a Russian ice station to the North Pole, during which he fell through the ice and required frostbite surgery in Norway. He has also completed jet-ski trips from Canada to New York City and from the Bahamas to Key West, as well as an attempted journey from Nantucket to Bermuda. His mountaineering pursuits include ascents of Mount Kilimanjaro and Cho Oyu, and he is qualified to climb Mount Everest. At age 18, he set a goal to retire by 40 and purchase a wine store, a milestone he subsequently achieved. He is recognized for his expertise in private equity insurance.
