= Greuter =

Greuter is a surname. Notable people with the surname include:

- Bernhard Greuter (1745–1822), Swiss textile manufacturer
- Mary Helen Wright Greuter (1914–1997), American astronomer and historian
- Matthaeus Greuter (1564–1638), German etcher and engraver
- Ursina Greuter, Swiss paralympic athlete
- Werner Greuter (born 1938), Swiss botanist
