= Enrique de Borja y Aragón =

Spanish noble

Arms of Enrique de Borja y Aragón

Enrique de Borja y Aragón (December 19, 1518, Gandía – September 16, 1540, Viterbo), was a Spanish noble of the House of Borgia. He was the Bishop of Squillace in Italy, and went on to become a Cardinal.

== Family origins ==
Enrique was a member of the prestigious Spanish House of Borja. He was the son of the third Duke of Gandia, Juan de Borja y Enríquez de Luna, and his first wife, Juana de Aragón. He was the brother of Francisco de Borja, and great-grandson of Pope Alexander VI.

== Biography ==
He became a member of the Order of Montesa and was a candidate to be the order's Grand Master but was unsuccessful in his bid. He stayed on as the Comendador Mayor.

Enrique was later named Bishop of Squillace and then was named the cardinal-deacon of Santos Nereo y Aquileo in May 1540, by order of Pope Paul III. In September of that same year, he died of a violent and unknown disease (violenti et incognito morbo).

== See also ==
- Cardinals created by Paul III
