= Roman Catholic Diocese of Squillace =

Former Latin Catholic diocese in Italy

The Diocese of Squillace (Lat.: Scyllatium) was a Latin Church ecclesiastical jurisdiction or diocese of the Catholic Church in Calabria, Italy. The diocese was established in the 5th century, and suppressed in 1986. In that year, it was combined into the Archdiocese of Catanzaro-Squillace. It was a suffragan of the archdiocese of Reggio in Calabria.

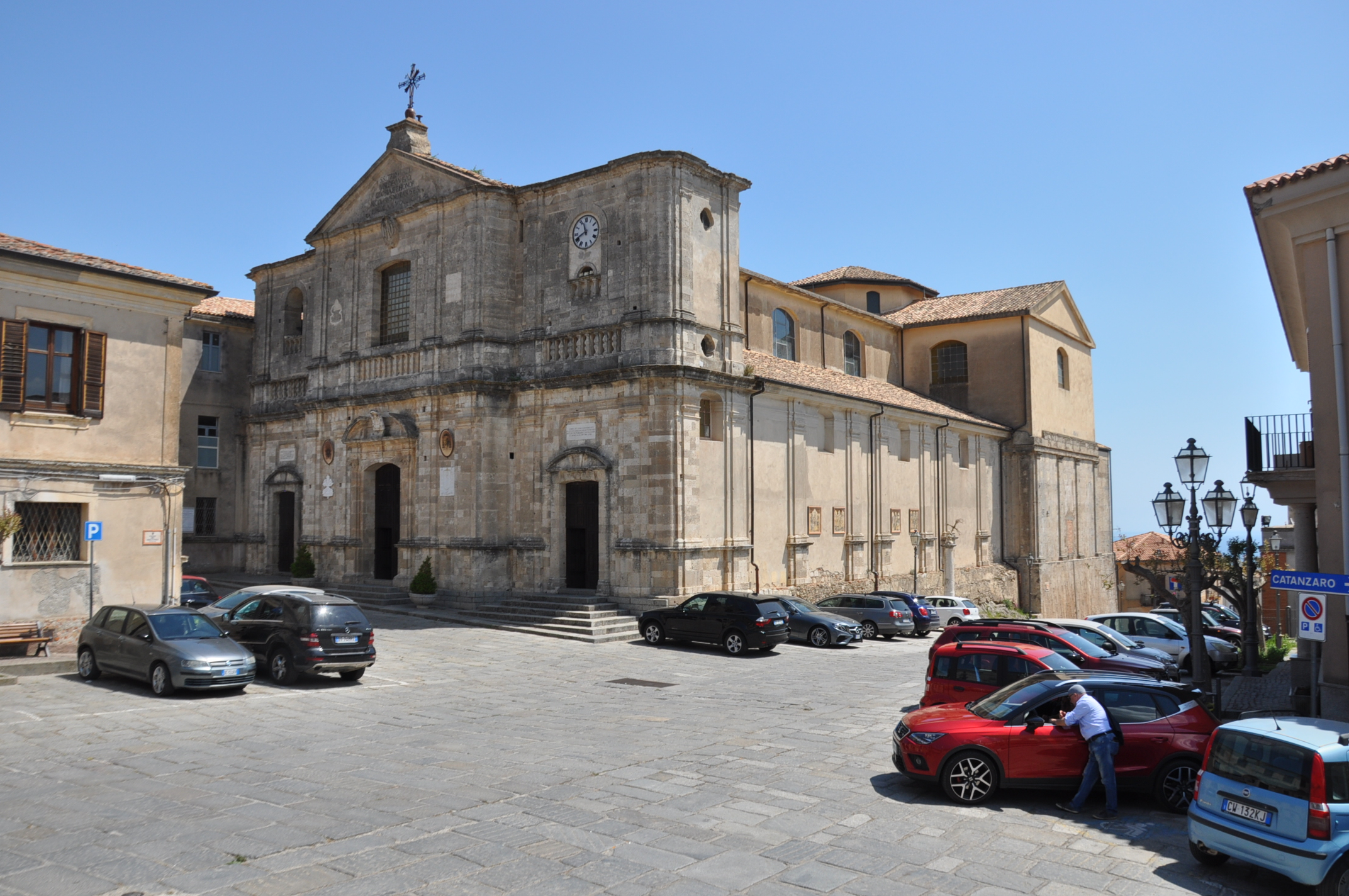
Co-cathedral of the Assumption, Squillace

== History ==
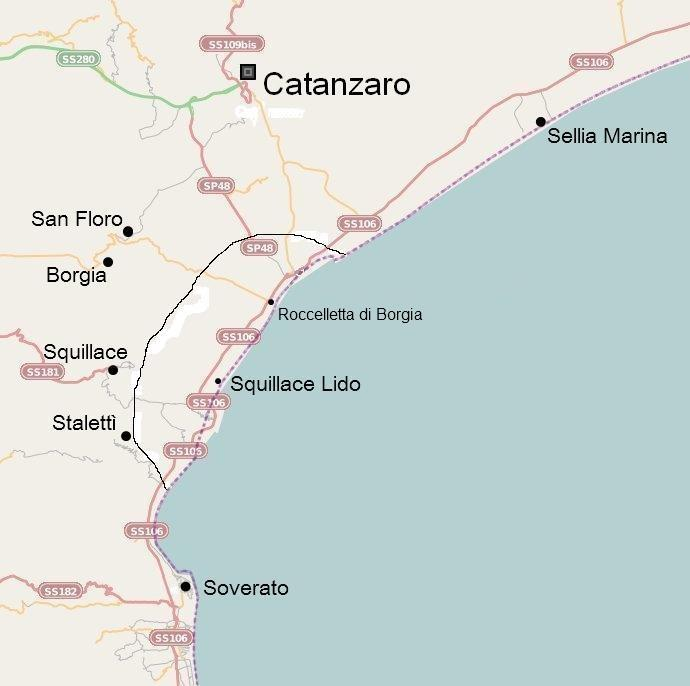
Map of region of Squillace

The territory of Squillace contains Stilo, the ancient Consilinum, three bishops of which are known, Sabinus (495) being the earliest. The creation of a diocese at Stilo in the 11th century is a matter of controversy.

The first known Bishop of Squillace is Gaudentius (465), who attended the Roman council of Pope Hilarius on 18 November 465. His two immediate successors, whose names are not preserved, were both murdered by priests of Squillace; the archdeacon Asello was deposed from his office for his part in the crimes. Bishop Zachæus accompanied Pope Vigilius to Constantinople (551). Joannes, previously Bishop of Lissa in Dalmatia, having been driven out by the barbarians, was transferred to Squillace by Gregory the Great (591).

=== Greek occupation ===
In 732, following the condemnation of Iconoclasm by both Pope Gregory II and Pope Gregory III, the Byzantine Emperor Leo III the Isaurian launched a punitive campaign against the papacy and its supporters. Among other territories, he conquered a third of the island of Sicily and all of Calabria, including Squillace. In 740, he declared that all of his conquered territories were subject to the Patriarch of Constantinople, and were obligated to adopt the Greek liturgical rite. Squillace was declared a suffragan of Reggio.

Bishop Demetrius of Squillace attended the Fourth Council of Constantinople in 869–870. The Diatyposis of Leo the Wise (c. 900) registers Squillace as a suffragan of the metropolitan of Reggio.

After Bishop Demetrius, no bishops are mentioned until the Norman conquest.

=== The Norman church ===
Both Reggio and Squillace were conquered by the Normans in 1060.

In 1096, Count Roger I of Sicily, with the advice and consent of numerous bishops in his domain, erected the cathedral, into which the Roman Rite was introduced, though the use of the Byzantine Rite continued much longer in the diocese. The cathedral was administered and served by a corporation called the Chapter, which was composed of five dignities (the Dean, the Cantor, the Archdeacon, the Treasurer and the Archpriest) and fifteen canons. Joannes de Nicephoro (1096–1098) was the first Latin Church bishop of Squillace.

Between 1091 and 1101, St. Bruno established two Carthusian monasteries within the limits of the diocese, S. Maria dell' Eremo and S. Stefano in Nemore, the latter having the less rigorous discipline. Bishop Theodorus of Squillace participated in the consecration of S. Maria on 15 August 1094. The monastery of S. Maria was destroyed in the great earthquake of 1783.

On 5 April 1110, Pope Paschal II confirmed the privileges and property of the diocese of Squillace, just as Pope Urban II had done in 1096, recollecting the favor of Pope Gregory which Squillace had enjoyed. Pope Paschal also granted the privilege that bishop Petrus and all his successors would be consecrated by the pope personally; this was one of the privileges granted by Pope Gregory I to Bishop Joannes in 592. Squillace was confirmed as being directly subordinate to the papacy.

When Pope Alexander III confirmed the privileges and possessions of the archdiocese of Reggio on 19 November 1165, the diocese of Squillace was included among its suffragans. The Liber censuum of Cencius Camerarius (1192) also lists the diocese of Squillace as a suffragan of the archdiocese of Reggio.

In his bull "De Utiliori" of 27 June 1818, which reorganized the diocesan structure of the Kingdom of the Two Sicilies in consequence of the new Concordat of February 16, 1818, Pope Pius VII included Squillace among the suffragans of the metropolitan archdiocese of Reggio.

Invasions of Saracens in the ninth and tenth centuries, a landing of the Turks in 1595, and the earthquake of 1783 caused the ruin of Squillace. The cathedral had to be rebuilt.

=== Diocesan Reorganization ===
Following the Second Vatican Council, and in accordance with the norms laid out in the council's decree, Christus Dominus chapter 40, a revision of ecclesiastical provinces and diocesan structures was advised. The Council also recommended the abolition of anomalous units such as exempt territorial prelatures. Pope Paul VI ordered a reorganization of the ecclesiastical provinces in southern Italy, beginning with consultations among the members of the Congregation of Bishops in the Vatican Curia, the Italian Bishops Conference, and the various dioceses concerned.

On 18 February 1984, the Vatican and the Italian State signed a new and revised concordat. Based on the revisions, a set of Normae was issued on 15 November 1984, which was accompanied in the next year, on 3 June 1985, by enabling legislation. According to the agreement, the practice of having one bishop govern two separate dioceses at the same time, aeque personaliter, was abolished. The Vatican continued consultations which had begun under Pope John XXIII for the merging of small dioceses, especially those with personnel and financial problems, into one combined diocese.

On 30 September 1986, Pope John Paul II ordered that the Diocese of Squillace be merged with the Diocese of Catanzaro into one diocese with one bishop, with the Latin title Archidioecesis Catacensis-Squillacensis. The seat of the diocese was to be in Catanzaro. The cathedral in Squillace was to have the honorary title of "co-cathedral"; its Chapter was to be a Capitulum Concathedralis. There was to be only one diocesan Tribunal, in Catanzaro, and likewise one seminary, one College of Consultors, and one Priests' Council. The territory of the new diocese was to include the territory of the suppressed diocese of Squillace. The archdiocese of Catanzaro-Squillace was the metropolitan of the ecclesiastical province of Catanzaro-Squillace.

== Bishops of Squillace ==
Erected: 5th Century

=== 5th Century to 1200 ===
...

- Gaudentius (attested 465)
- [Anonymous] (before 496)
- [Anonymous] (before 496)

...

- Zacchaeus (attested 551–553)

...

- Augustinus (attested 649)

...

- Paulus (attested 680)

...

- Demetrius (attested 870)

...

- Theodorus Mesimericus (attested 1091–1096)

...

- Joannes de Nicephoro (1096–1098)

...

- Petrus (1110–1123)
- Donatus (attested 1132)
- Drogo (attested 1140)
- Sicalzius (attested 1145)

...

- Hugo de Recaneto (attested 1196–1198)

=== 1200 to 1500 ===
- Aymericus (attested 1207-1211)
- [Anonymous] (attested 1215)
- [ R. ] (1217–1218) Bishop-elect
- Nicolaus (attested 1218–1222)
- [ R. ] (attested 1231–1234)

[ R.] (1234–1235) Apostolic Administrator
Sede vacante (attested 1239)

- Benvenutus (1251–1254 removed) Bishop-elect
- Tommaso, O.Cist. (attested 1254–1263)
- [ Anonymous ] (attested 1266)
- Riccardus (1266–1272)

Sede vacante (1272–1273)

- Philippus (attested 1274–1286)

...

- Giordano (d. 1344)
- Nicolaus de Teramo (1345–1349)
- Joannes de Rocca (1349–1369)
- Matthaeus Scaleata, O.Carm. (1369– before 1381)
- Antonius (attested 1381–1394)
- Philippus Crispi, O.S.A. (attested 1392) Roman Obedience
- Robertus de Basilio (1402–1413) Roman Obedience
- Leo Colocuri (Calojero) (1413–1417) Pisan Obedience
- Francesco de Arceriis (1418–1476)
- Francesco (Gaetani ?) (1477–1480)
- Vincenzo Galeotti (1482–1514)

=== 1500 to 1800 ===
- Antonio Pisanello (attested 1517)
- Simeon de Galeotti (1520–1539)
- Enrique de Borja y Aragón (17 Dec 1539 – 16 Sep 1540)
- Enrique de Villalobos Xeres (5 Nov 1540 – 1554)
- Alfonso de Villalobos Xeres (1554–1568 Resigned)
- Guglielmo Sirleto (27 Feb 1568 – 29 May 1573 Resigned)
- Marcello Sirleto (1573–1594)
- Tommaso Sirleto (1594 – 1601)
- Paolo Isaresi della Mirandola, O.P. (13 Aug 1601 – 1602)
- Fabrizio Sirleto (7 Apr 1603 – 1 Apr 1635)
- Lodovico Saffiro (17 Sep 1635 – Nov 1635 Died)
- Giuseppe della Corgna (Cornea), O.P. (22 Sep 1636 – 20 Mar 1656 Appointed, Bishop of Orvieto)
- Rodolfo Dulcino (12 Mar 1657 – 10 Oct 1664 Died)
- Francesco Tirotta (13 Apr 1665 – 17 Jan 1676 Died)
- Paolo Filocamo (bishop) (27 Apr 1676 – 14 Sep 1687 Died)
- Alfonso de Aloysio (31 May 1688 – May 1694 Died)
- Gennaro Crespino (19 Jul 1694 – Sep 1697 Died)
- Fortunato Durante (20 Nov 1697 – 23 Nov 1714 Died)
- Marco Antonio Attaffi (11 Feb 1718 – 17 Aug 1733 Died)
- Nicola Michele Abati (Abbate) (28 Sep 1733 – 6 May 1748 Died)
- Francesco Saverio Maria Queralt y Aragona (6 May 1748 – 11 Nov 1762)
- Diego Genovese (21 Mar 1763 – 26 May 1778)
- Nicolas de Notariis (20 Jul 1778 – 8 Jul 1802)

=== 1800 to 1986 ===
- Nicola Antonio Montiglia (1818 – 1824)
- Andrea Rispoli, C.SS.R. (13 Mar 1826 Confirmed – 18 Sep 1839 Died)
- Concezio Pasquini (22 Jul 1842 Confirmed – 21 Dec 1857 Confirmed, Bishop of Ariano)
- Raffaele Antonio Morisciano (27 Sep 1858 – 1 Sep 1909)
- Eugenio Tosi, O.Ss.C.A. (5 Apr 1911 – 22 Mar 1917 Appointed, Bishop of Andria)
- Giorgio Giovanni Elli (23 Feb 1918 – 10 Feb 1920 Died)
- Antonio Melomo (17 Mar 1922 – 7 Feb 1927 Appointed, Bishop of Monopoli)
- Giovanni Fiorentini (23 Dec 1927 – 16 Jun 1950 Resigned)
- Armando Fares (16 Jun 1950 – 31 Jul 1980 Retired)
- Antonio Cantisani (31 Jul 1980 – 30 Sep 1986 Appointed, Archbishop of Catanzaro-Squillace)

30 September 1986: United with the Archdiocese of Catanzaro to form the Archdiocese of Catanzaro-Squillace

== See also ==
- List of Catholic dioceses in Italy

== Bibliography ==
=== Episcopal lists ===
- Eubel, Conradus, ed. (1913). Hierarchia catholica (in Latin). Vol. I (second ed.). Münster: Libreria Regensbergiana.
- Eubel, Conradus, ed. (1914). Hierarchia catholica (in Latin). Vol. II (second ed.). Münster: Libreria Regensbergiana.
- Eubel, Conradus; Gulik, Guilelmus (1923). Hierarchia catholica (in Latin). Vol. III (second ed.). Münster: Libreria Regensbergiana.
- Gams, Pius Bonifatius (1873). Series episcoporum Ecclesiae catholicae: quotquot innotuerunt a beato Petro apostolo (in Latin). Ratisbon: Typis et Sumptibus Georgii Josephi Manz. p. 927.
- Gauchat, Patritius (Patrice) (1935). Hierarchia catholica (in Latin). Vol. IV (1592-1667). Münster: Libraria Regensbergiana.
- Ritzler, Remigius; Sefrin, Pirminus (1952). Hierarchia catholica medii et recentis aevi (in Latin). Vol. V (1667-1730). Patavii: Messagero di S. Antonio.
- Ritzler, Remigius; Sefrin, Pirminus (1958). Hierarchia catholica medii et recentis aevi (in Latin). Vol. VI (1730-1799). Patavii: Messagero di S. Antonio.
- Ritzler, Remigius; Sefrin, Pirminus (1968). Hierarchia Catholica medii et recentioris aevi (in Latin). Vol. VII (1800–1846). Monasterii: Libreria Regensburgiana.
- Remigius Ritzler; Pirminus Sefrin (1978). Hierarchia catholica Medii et recentioris aevi (in Latin). Vol. VIII (1846–1903). Il Messaggero di S. Antonio.
- Pięta, Zenon (2002). Hierarchia catholica medii et recentioris aevi (in Latin). Vol. IX (1903–1922). Padua: Messagero di San Antonio. ISBN 978-88-250-1000-8.

=== Studies ===
- Anastos, Milton V. (1957). "The Transfer of Illyricum, Calabria and Sicily to the Jurisdiction of the Patriarchate of Constantinople in 732–733," in: Studi bizantini e neoellenici Vol. 9 (1957), pp. 14-31. [Silloge bizantina in onore di S. G. Mercati]
- Calabretta, Leonardo (2004). Le diocesi di Squillace e Catanzaro. Cardinali, arcivescovi e vescovi nati nelle due diocesi. (in Italian) Cosenza Pellegrini Editore, 2004.
- Cappelletti, Giuseppe (1870). Le chiese d'Italia dalla loro origine sino ai nostri giorni (in Italian). Vol. Tomo vigesimo primo (21). Venezia: G. Antonelli. pp. 227–236.
- Commodaro, Pietro Emidio (1975). La Diocesi di Squillace (Calabria) attraverso gli ultimi tre sinodi : 1754, 1784, 1889. (in Italian and Latin) Vibo Valentia, 1975.
- Duchesne, Louis (1902), "Les évèchés de Calabre," Mélanges Paul Fabre: études d'histoire du moyen âge (in French). Paris: A. Picard et fils. 1902. pp. 1–16.
- Duchesne Louis. "Les évêchés de Calabre." In: Scripta Minora. Études de topographie romaine et de géographie ecclésiastique. Rome: École Française de Rome, 1973. pp. 439-454. [Publications de l'École française de Rome, 13-1]
- Feudale, Domenico (1782). Scylacenorum antistitum accurata series chronologica. (in Latin) Napoli: Vincenzo Orsini. [antiquated, inaccurate]
- Kamp, Norbert (1977). "Vescovi e diocesi nell'Italia meridionale nel passaggio dalla dominazione bizantina allo Stato normanno." (in Italian). In: Forme di potere e struttura sociale in Italia nel medioevo Bologna: Il Mulino, 1977. pp. 379-397.
- Kamp, Norbert (1975). Kirche und Monarchie im staufischen Königreich Sizilien: I. Prosopographische Grundlegung, Bistumer und Bistümer und Bischöfe des Konigreichs 1194–1266: 2. Apulien und Calabrien (in German) München: Wilhelm Fink 1975. pp. 984-995.
- Kehr, Paulus Fridolin (1975). Italia pontificia. Regesta pontificum Romanorum. Vol. X: Calabria–Insulae. (in Latin) Berlin: Weidmann.
- Taccone-Gallucci, Domenico (1902). Regesti dei Romani pontefici della Calabria (in Italian). Rome: Tip. Vaticana. p. 419.
- Lanzoni, Francesco (1927). Le diocesi d'Italia dalle origini al principio del secolo VII (an. 604). (in Italian). Faenza: F. Lega 1927.
- Luca, Santo (1998). "Le diocesi di Gerace e Squillace: tra manoscritti e marginalia," (in Italian), in: Calabria Bizantina: Civiltà bizantina nei territori di Gerace e Stilo Rubbetino 1998, pp. 246-307.
- Ughelli, Ferdinando; Coleti, Niccolò (1721). Italia sacra sive De episcopis Italiæ, et insularum adjacentium (in Latin). Vol. Tomus nonus (9). Venice: apud Sebastianum Coleti. pp. 422–448.

=== External links ===
- Benigni, Umberto. "Squillace." The Catholic Encyclopedia. Vol. 14. New York: Robert Appleton Company, 1912. 27 Apr. 2023. [derived entirely from Cappelletti]
