= Roman Catholic Diocese of Narni =

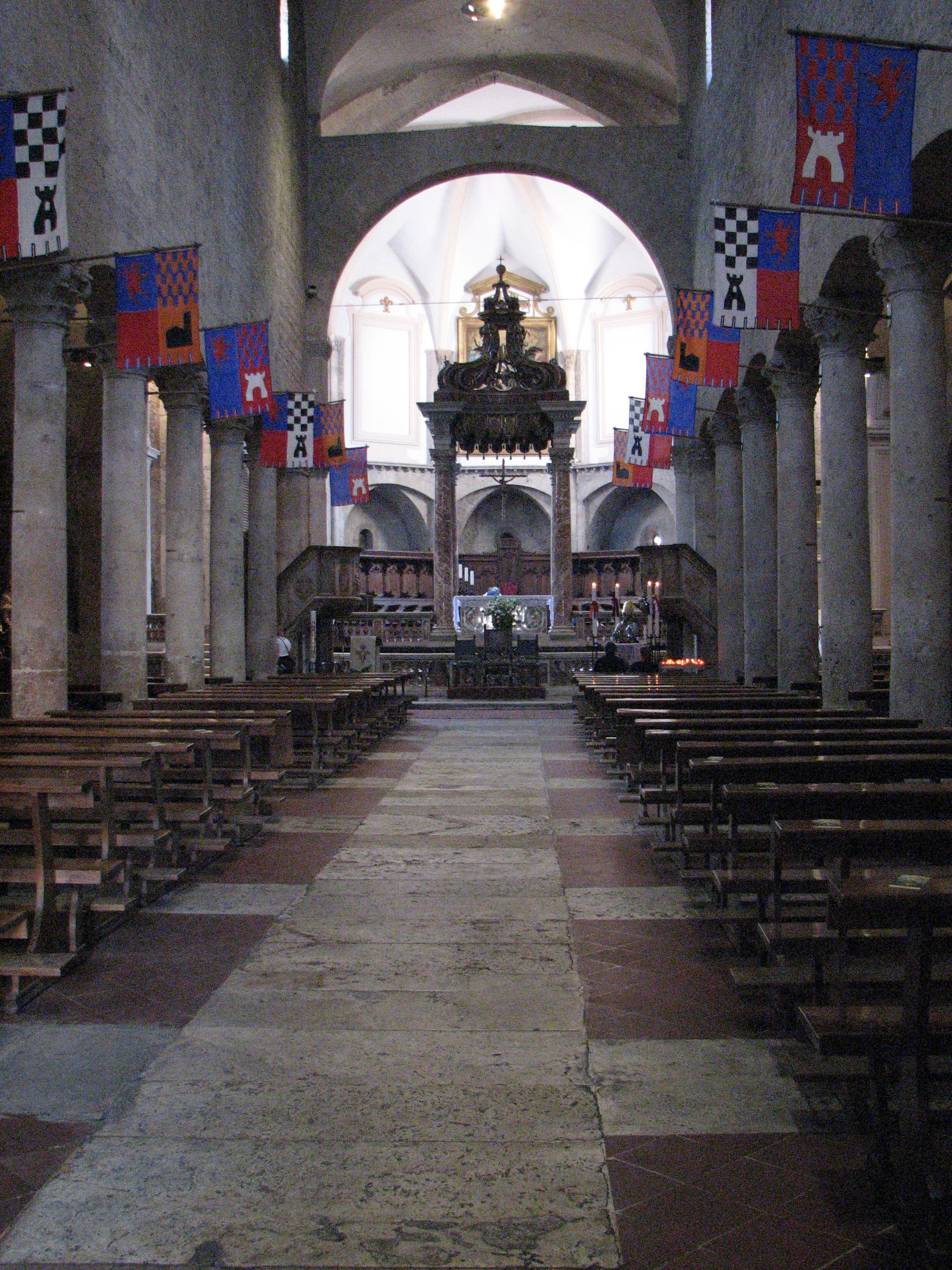
Co-Cathedral of San Giovenale in Narni

The Roman Catholic Diocese of Narni, lat. Dioecesis Narniensis, in central Italy, founded in the 4th century, was united in 1907, becoming the Dioceses of Terni and of Narni. In 1983, the diocese of Amelia was added, forming the dioceses of Terni, Narni e Amelia. In 1986, the dioceses of Narni and Amelia were suppressed, and their territories added to the diocese of Terni, forming the single Diocese of Terni-Narni-Amelia.

== History ==
Narni is the ancient Nequinum of the Sabines, called Narnia by the Romans. The Emperor Nerva (Marcus Cocceius Nerva) was a native of Narni.

Liutprand, King of the Lombards captured the town in 726, but Pope Zacharias persuaded him to present it as a donation to Saint Peter in 742, after which it remained under pontifical rule. On the Rocca di Narni, the highest point above the city was a fortress, belonging to the popes and presided over by a papal governor or castellan. It is mention in documents as early as 1174, and was restored by Pope Benedict XI, c. 1303–1305.

There was once a diocese called Otriculum (Otricoli), but it was destroyed in the time of Pope Gregory I, and its territory was taken into the diocese of Narni. There was a collegiate church in the new Otricolo, dedicated to S. Maria.

Narni venerates as its first bishop the martyr Iuvenalis, who died in the second half of the fourth century. Gregory the Great refers to the bishop Cassius, who died in 558. Poe Gregory also wrote a letter to the bishop Praejecticius, which shows that, at Narni, at that time, there were still pagans to be converted.

Bishop John (940) was succeeded by his son, who became Pope John XIII; another bishops were: William, a Franciscan, whom Pope Urban V employed against the Fraticelli (1367).

From 1198 to 1214, Narni was in rebellion against Pope Innocent III, who temporarily suppressed its episcopal see.

=== Chapter and cathedral ===
In March 1145, Pope Eugenius III consecrated the Oratory of S. Iuvenalis and reconsecrated the cathedral of SS. Iuvenalis, Cassius and Maximus. The pope spent more than three weeks in Narni.

In a bull issued for Archdeacon Albert on 17 January 1069, Pope Alexander II confirmed the possessions of the canons of Narni. Innocent II signed a bull, addressed to the Archdeacon Hugo, the Priest Gotifredus, and the rest of the canons [ceteris canonicis], taking the Church of Narni under papal protection. He also grants that no one can be made a canon without the consent of the Prior and the brothers. In April 1159, Pope Alexander III ordered the bishop and canons to cease electing to canonries laypersons and illiterates. In 1180, Pope Alexander III limited the number of canons to 24. In 1194, Pope Celestine III intervened in the installation of canons, voiding the entire process on the grounds of dissension; those who had thrown stones at the bishop were to remain excommunicated until they made satisfaction.

In 1642, Bishop Giovanni Paolo Buccerelli (1634–1656) had the remains of Saint Juvenalis "rediscovered" in the cathedral, and transferred to the Confession of the cathedral.

With funds supplied by three successive bishops, Guicciardi, Oldi and Terzaghi, the tribune, high altar, and confession of the cathedral were restored; they were consecrated by Bishop Terzaghi on 20 October 1728.

=== Diocesan composition ===
In 1761, the city of Narnia contained 6 parishes in a population of c. 1,200 persons; the diocese had 47 parishes in all. It also contained 8 religious houses for men, and 5 for women. At some distance from the city were two houses of Capuchins, two of Observant Minorites and one of Reformed Minorites. Seven of the diocese's parishes were collegiate churches. The churches of this city contain many paintings of the ancient Umbrian school.

The city of Narni was sacked by the forces of the Emperor Charles V on 17 July 1527.

The priestly seminary of Narni was founded by Bishop Raimondo Castelli (1656-1670), on 11 April 1660.. It had accommodations for twenty students.

A diocesan synod took place in 1625, presided over by Bishop Giovanni Battista Bonetti (1606–1632). Bishop Raimondo Castelli (1656–1670) held a diocesan synod in Narni in June 1665.

Narni was visited on 28 February 1782 by Pope Pius VI, who was en route to Vienna for talks with the Emperor Joseph II. In 1809 and again in 1814, Narni was visited by Pope Pius VII during his departure for imprisonment in France and exile and during his return to Rome.

=== Union with Terni aeque personaliter ===
Bishop Moretti's successor as Bishop of Terni e Narni on 13 June 1921 was Cesare Boccoleri. He was appointed bishop of the two cathedral churches of Terni and of Narni, making it clear that each of the two dioceses continued to have a separate existence and that their union was aeque personaliter, two dioceses having the same bishop. The diocese of Narni was not suppressed.

On 26 June 1976, the diocese of Narnia lost one parish to the diocese of Rieti.

=== Diocesan reorganization ===
On 13 September 1983, Franco Gualdrini, who had been Rector of the Collegium Capranicum in Rome, was appointed bishop of Terni, Narni and Amelia, aeque principaliter. The diocese of Narni continued to exist intact, though its bishop was also the bishop of another diocese.

The Second Vatican Council (1962–1965), in order to ensure that all Catholics received proper spiritual attention, decreed the reorganization of the diocesan structure of Italy and the consolidation of small and struggling dioceses. It also recommended the abolition of anomalous units such as exempt territorial prelatures.

On 18 February 1984, the Vatican and the Italian State signed a new and revised concordat. Based on the revisions, a set of Normae was issued on 15 November 1984, which was accompanied in the next year, on 3 June 1985, by enabling legislation. According to the agreement, the practice of having one bishop govern two separate dioceses at the same time, aeque personaliter, as was the case with Terni, Narni and Amelia, was to be abolished. Instead, the Vatican continued consultations which had begun under Pope John XXIII for the merging of small dioceses, especially those with personnel and financial problems, into one combined diocese.

On 27 September 1986, Pope John Paul II approved a decree, which was published by the Congregation of Bishops on 30 September 1986. The dioceses of Terni, Narni, and Ameria were united into one single diocese. Its seat was fixed at Terni, where its cathedral remained the cathedral of the united diocese. The former cathedrals at Narni and Ameria were given the honorary rank of co-cathedral. The name of the diocese was to be «Dioecesis Interamnensis-Narniensis-Amerina».

== Bishops ==
=== to 1200 ===
- Iuvenalis (359 – 7 August 376)

[ Maximus ? (376–416) ]

- Pancratius (I) (416 – 444)

[ Hercules ? (455 – 470) ]
[ Pancratius II (? – 5 October 493) ]
[ Vitalianus (before May 495 ? – after 499) ]
[ Syrus ]
[ Valentinus ]
[ Proculus of Narni ? (c. 536 )]

- Cassius (536 –558)

[ Iuvenalis (II) ? (558 – 565) ]

- Ioannes (I) (c. September/December 558–560)
- Praeject(ici)us (mentioned in 591)
- Constantius (before July 595 – after 601)
- Anastasius (before 649 – 17 August 653 ?)
- Deusdedit (before 679 – after 680)
- Vilarus (mentioned in 721)
- Constantine (II) (mentioned in 741)
- Ansuald (mentioned in 769)
- Stephen I (mentioned in 853)
- Martin I (before 861 – after 879)
- Bonosus (before 898 – after 906)
- John (c. 940)
- John (II) (before 961 –965)
- Stephanus (II) (attested 968 – 1015)
- Dodo ? (before 1028 – after 1037)

[ Martin (1050) ]

- Adalbert (or Albert) (attested 1059 – 1065)
- Rudolf (mentioned c. 1092)
- Augustinus (before 1101 – after 1125)
- Ignotus (mentioned in 1146)
- Petrus (Lombardus) (before 1156 –1161)
- Amatus (mentioned in 1179)
- Boniface (before September 1180 – after 1196)

=== 1200 to 1600 ===
- Ugolino ? (mentioned in 1208)
- Ioannes (1220 – 1225?)
- Gregory (before September 1225 – after 1234)
- Jacopo Mansueti (c. 1242 – c. 1260)
- Orlando (1261 – 1303)
- Petrus, O.E.S.A. (December 1305 – after July 1322)
- Amator (1323–1336)
- Linus (17 April 1336 – 1342)
- Agostino Tinacci (17 March 1343 – 1367)
- Guglielmo, O.Min. (1367–1373)
- Luca Bertini, O.Can.S.A. (1373–1377)
- Giacomo Tolomei, O.F.M. (1378–1383)
- Bartholomaeus (1383–1386)
- Francesco Bellanti (before September 1386 – 1407)
- Giacomo da Perugia, O.P. (1407 – 1408)
- Angelo (7 August 1408 – 1412)
- Donadio (1414–1418)
- Giacomo Bonriposi (31 January 1418 – 1455)
- Lellus (1455–1462)
- Constantin Eruli (10 Dec 1462 – 8 Jan 1472 Appointed, Bishop of Todi)
- Carlo Boccardini (8 Jan 1472 – 1498)
- Pietro Guzman (4 Jul 1498 – 21 Apr 1515)
- Cardinal Francesco Soderini (21 Apr 1515 – 18 May 1517 Resigned), Administrator
- Ugolino Martelli (18 May 1517 – 1523 Died)
- Carlo Soderini (1523 – 1524 Died)
- Cardinal Paolo Emilio Cesi (1524 Resigned), Administrator
- Bartolomeo Cesi (1 Jul 1524 – 1537)

○ Guido Ascanio Sforza di Santa Fiora (1537–1538 Resigned), Administrator

- Giovanni Rinaldi Montorio (11 Jan 1538 – 1546)
- Pierdonato Cesi (seniore) (1546 – 12 Jul 1566 Resigned)
- Romolo Cesi (12 Jul 1566 – 13 Jun 1578 Resigned)
- Erolo Eroli (13 Jun 1578 – 13 Oct 1600)

=== Since 1600 ===
- Giovanni Battista Toschi (1602–1606)
- Giovanni Battista Bonetti (1606–1632)
- Lorenzo Azzolini (1632–1633)
- Giovanni Paolo Buccerelli (22 Mar 1634 – 21 Feb 1656)
- Raimondo Castelli (26 Jun 1656 – 14 Jul 1670)
- Ottavio Avio (1 Sep 1670 – 9 Aug 1682)
- Giuseppe Felice Barlacci (24 May 1683 – 1 May 1690 Resigned)
- Francesco Picarelli (22 May 1690 – Dec 1708)
- Francesco Saverio Guicciardi (15 Apr 1709 – 1718)
- Gioacchino Maria Oldi, O.Carm. (11 Feb 1718 – 27 Jan 1725 Resigned)
- Nicola Terzaghi (1725–1761)
- Prospero Celestino Meloni (23 Nov 1761 – 1791)
- Antonio David (27 Jun 1796 – 14 Jun 1818)
- Antonio Maria Borghi (2 Oct 1818 – 8 Jun 1834)
- Gioacchino Tamburini (Tamberini) (1834–1842)
- Giuseppe Maria Galligari (22 Jul 1842 – 1858 Resigned)
- Giacinto Luzi (23 Dec 1858 – 9 Jan 1876)
- Vitale Galli (9 Jan 1876 – 12 Jul 1888)
- Cesare Boccanera (11 Feb 1889 – Nov 1905 Resigned)
- Francesco Moretti (1905–1907)

United aeque personaliter, on 12 April 1907, with the Diocese of Terni to form the Dioceses of Terni e Narni

== See also ==
- Diocese of Amelia
- Diocese of Terni-Narni-Amelia

== Sources ==
=== Lists of bishops ===
- Eubel, Conradus, ed. (1913). Hierarchia catholica (in Latin). Vol. 1 (Tomus 1) (second ed.). Münster: Libreria Regensbergiana. p. 356-357.. Archived.
- Eubel, Conradus, ed. (1914). Hierarchia catholica (in Latin). Vol. 2 (Tomus 2) (second ed.). Münster: Libreria Regensbergiana. p. 199.. Archived.
- Eubel, Conradus, ed. (1923). Hierarchia catholica (in Latin). Vol. 3 (Tomus 3) (second ed.). Münster: Libreria Regensbergiana. p. 253.. Archived.
- Gams, Pius Bonifatius (1873). Series episcoporum Ecclesiae catholicae: quotquot innotuerunt a beato Petro apostolo (in Latin). Ratisbon: Typis et Sumptibus Georgii Josephi Manz. pp. 707–708.
- Gauchat, Patritius (Patrice) (1935). Hierarchia catholica IV (1592-1667) (in Latin). Münster: Libraria Regensbergiana. p. 252.
- Ritzler, Remigius; Sefrin, Pirminus (1952). Hierarchia catholica medii et recentis aevi. Vol. Tomus V (1667-1730). Patavii: Messagero di S. Antonio. p. 280.
- Ritzler, Remigius; Sefrin, Pirminus (1958). Hierarchia catholica medii et recentis aevi. Vol. Tomus VI (1730-1799). Patavii: Messagero di S. Antonio. p. 301.
- Ritzler, Remigius; Sefrin, Pirminus (1968). Hierarchia Catholica medii et recentioris aevi (in Latin). Vol. VII (1800–1846). Monasterii: Libreria Regensburgiana.
- Remigius Ritzler; Pirminus Sefrin (1978). Hierarchia catholica Medii et recentioris aevi (in Latin). Vol. VIII (1846–1903). Il Messaggero di S. Antonio.
- Pięta, Zenon (2002). Hierarchia catholica medii et recentioris aevi (in Latin). Vol. IX (1903–1922). Padua: Messagero di San Antonio. ISBN 978-88-250-1000-8.

=== Studies ===
- Cappelletti, Giuseppe (1846). Le chiese d'Italia dalla loro origine sino ai nostri giorni. (in Italian). Volume 4. Venice: Tip. Emiliana 1846), pp. 541-572.
- Eroli, Giovanni (1858). Miscellanea storica narnese. (in Italian). Vol. 1. Narni: Tip. Gattamelata 1858.
- Eroli, Giovanni (1898). Descrizione delle chiese di Narni e suoi dintorni le più importanti rispetto all'antichità e alle belle arti. (in Italian). Narni: Petrignani 1898.
- Kehr, Paul Fridolin (1909). Italia pontificia Vol. IV (Berlin: Weidmann 1909), pp. 29-34. (in Latin)
- Lanzoni, Francesco (1923). Le diocesi d'Italia dalle origini al principio del secolo VII (an. 604) (in Italian). Rome: Biblioteca Apostolica Vaticana. pp. 402–404.. Archived.
- Schwartz, Gerhard (1907). Die Besetzung der Bistümer Reichsitaliens unter den sächsischen und salischen Kaisern: mit den Listen der Bischöfe, 951-1122. (in German). Leipzig: B.G. Teubner. pp. 284-286.
- Ughelli, Ferdinando; Coleti, Nicolò (1717). Italia sacra: sive De episcopis Italiae et insularum adjacentium (in Latin). Vol. 1 (Tomus primus). Venice: apud Sebastianum Coleti. pp. 1007–1022.
