= Angelo =

- Pronunciation: Italian: [ˈandʒelo]
- Gender: Male
- Language: Italian

Origin
- Meaning: "angel", or "messenger"
- Region of origin: Italy

Other names
- Related names: Angela (given name), Angel (given name), Angel (surname), D'Angelo (surname), Michelangelo (given name)

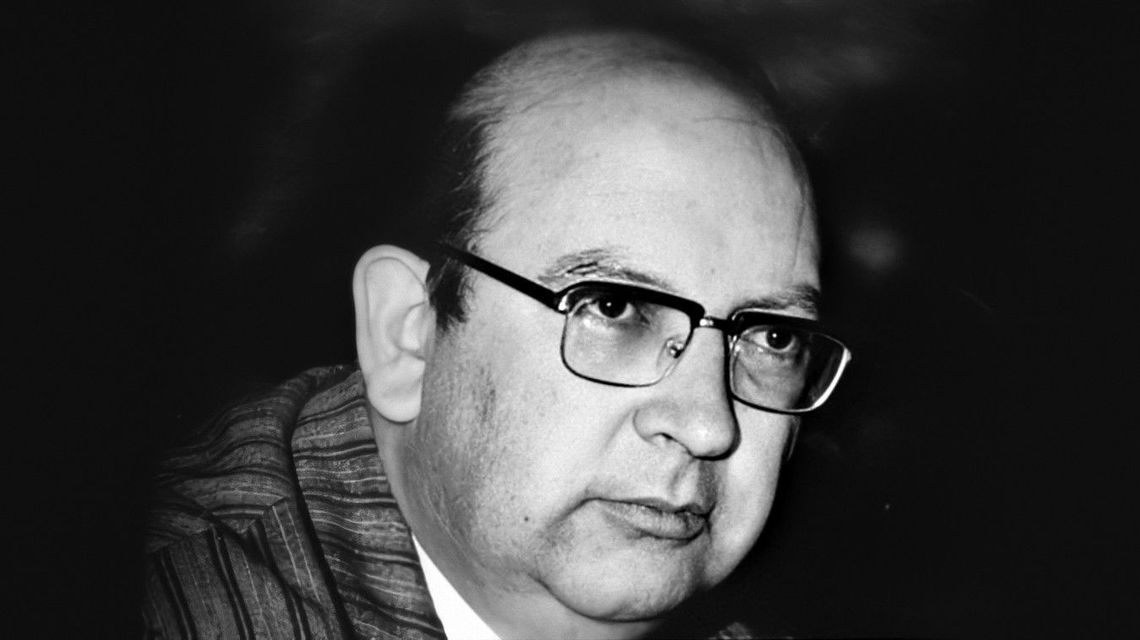
Salvatorangelo Spano

Angelo is an Italian masculine given name and surname meaning "angel", or "messenger".

== People ==
=== People with the given name ===
- Angelo Abenante (1927–2024), Italian trade unionist and politician
- Angelo Accardi, Italian visual artist
- Angelo Accattino (born 1966), Italian prelate of the Catholic Church
- Angelo Acciaioli, multiple people
- Angelo Acerbi (born 1925), Catholic Cardinal
- Angelo Achini or Angiolo Achini (1850–1930), Italian painter
- Angelo Acosta (born 2001), Filipino rapper
- Angelo Agostini (1843–1910), illustrator, journalist and founder of several publications, and although born in Italy, is considered the first Brazilian cartoonist
- Angelo Agrizzi, South African businessman and whistleblower
- Angelo Aimo (born 1964), Italian footballer
- Angelo Albanesi (late 1765–1784), Italian engraver
- Angelo Alessandri (born 1969), Italian politician
- Angelo Alessio (born 1965), Italian football manager and player
- Angelo Alistar (born 1975), Romanian footballer
- Angelo Allegri (born 1999), American basketball player
- Angelo Altieri, Italian Roman Catholic prelate
- Angelo Amato (1938–2024), Italian cardinal of the Catholic Church
- Angelo Ambrogini Poliziano (1454–1494), Florentine classical scholar and poet
- Angelo Andres (1851–1934), Italian zoologist
- Angelo Anelli (1761–1820), Italian
- Angelo Angeli (1864–1931), Italian chemist
- Angelo Anquilletti (1943–2015), Italian football defender
- Angelo Antonazzo (born 1981), Italian footballer
- Angelo Antonino Pipitone (born 1943), member of the Sicilian Mafia
- Ângelo Antônio (born 1964), Brazilian actor
- Angelo Arcidiacono (1955–2007), Italian fencer
- Angelo Arciglione (born 1982), Italian pianist
- Angelo J. Arculeo (1924–2013), American lawyer
- Angelo Ardinghi, Italian engraver
- Angelo Argea (1929–2005), Greek American caddie
- Angelo Attaguile (1947–2026), Italian politician
- Angelo Avramakis, Greek musician and bouzouki player
- Angelo Baccalario (1852–?), Italian painter
- Angelo Bacchetta (1841–1920), Italian painter
- Angelo Badà (1876–1941), Italian operatic tenor
- Angelo Badalamenti (1937–2022), American composer
- Angelo Badini (1894–1921), Italian Argentine footballer
- Angelo Bagnasco (born 1943), Italian Cardinal of the Catholic Church
- Ángelo Balanta (born 1990), Colombian footballer
- Angelo Banchero (1744–1793), Italian painter
- Angelo Barbarigo (died 1418), Roman Catholic cardinal
- Angelo Barbera, American bass player
- Angelo Barletta (born 1977), German retired footballer and manager
- Angelo Baroni (1553–1612)
- Angelo Barovier (died 1480), Italian glass artist
- Angelo Barretto (born 1969), Filipino race car driver
- Angelo Barrile (born 1976), Swiss politician
- Angelo Michele Bartolotti (died 1682), Italian guitarist, theorbo player and composer
- Angelo Bassini (1815–1889), Italian soldier and patriot
- Angelo Battelli (1862–1916), Italian scientist
- Angelo Beccaria (1820–1897), Italian landscape painter
- Angelo Bencivenga (born 1991), Italian footballer
- Angelo Bendinelli (1876–1942), Italian tenor
- Angelo Beolco (1502–1542)
- Angelo Berardi (c. 1636–1694), Italian composer
- Angelo Bergamonti (1939–1971), Italian Grand Prix motorcycle road racer
- Angelo Bertelli (1921–1999), American football quarterback
- Angelo Bertolazzi (1896–1963), Italian sculptor
- Angelo Bertoni (1933–2021), Australian politician
- Angelo Bianchi (1817–1897), Italian prelate
- Angelo Biancini, Italian sculptor
- Angelo Binaschi (1889–1973), Italian footballer
- Angelo Bissessarsingh (1982–2017), historian and author
- Angelo Blackson (born 1992), American football player
- Angélo Boldini (1929–1994), France international rugby league footballer
- Angelo Bollano (1918–1978), Italian footballer
- Angelo Bonelli (born 1962), Italian politician
- Ângelo Bonfietti (1926–2004), Brazilian basketball player
- Angelo Bongioanni (1864–1931), Italian librarian, literary scholar, and onomastician
- Angelo Bonomelli (born 1991), Italian-Costa Rican surfer
- Angelo Borrelli (born 1964), Italian government official and Head of the Civil Protection
- Angelo Boucheron (died 1859), Italian painter and engraver
- Angelo Branca (1903–1984), Canadian judge
- Angelo Branduardi (born 1950), Italian musician-composer
- Angelo Brignole (1924–2006), Italian racing cyclist
- Angelo Brofferio (1802–1866), Italian poet and politician
- Angelo Bronzino (1503–1572), Italian Mannerist painter
- Angelo Brovelli (1910–1995), American footballer
- Angelo Brückner (born 2003), German footballer
- Angelo Bruno (1910–1980), American mobster
- Angelo Bruschini (1960/1961–2023), English rock guitarist
- Angelo Buccarello (born 1942), member of the Roman Catholic clergy
- Angelo Buizza (1885–?), Italian politician
- Angelo Buono Jr. (1934–2002), American serial killer
- Angelo Buscema (born 1952), Italian magistrate
- Angelo C. Scott (1857–1949), academic and politician
- Angelo Caimo (1914–1998), Italian footballer
- Angelo Calogerà (1696–1766), Italian Benedictine monk and writer
- Angelo Caloia, President of the Vatican Bank
- Angelo Caloiaro (born 1989), American-Italian basketball player in the Israeli Basketball Premier League
- Angelo Camacho, Northern Mariana Islander politician
- Angelo Cameroni (1891–1961), Italian professional footballer
- Angelo Campanella (1748–1815), Italian painter and engraver
- Angelo Campos (born 2000), Swiss footballer
- Ángelo Campos (born 1993), Peruvian footballer
- Angelo Henrique Candido de Siqueira (born 2008), Brazilian professional footballer
- Angelo Canevari (1901–c. 1955), Italian painter
- Angelo Canini (Angelus Canisius, 1521–1527), (1521–1557), Italian grammarian, linguist and scholar
- Angelo Capato (1854–1936), businesswoman magnate on the Island of Caphalonia, Greece
- Angelo Felice Capelli (1681–1749), Italian mathematician
- Angelo Cappello (born 2002), Belizean footballer
- Angelo Capranica, Italian Roman Catholic bishop and cardinal
- Angelo Carasale (died 1742), Italian architect, active mainly in Naples
- Angelo Carbone (born 1968), Italian footballer
- Angelo Cardona (born 1997), Colombian social entrepreneur and activist
- Angelo Carletti di Chivasso (1411–1495), Italian Franciscan theologian
- Angelo Caroli (1937–2020), Italian footballer
- Angelo Caroselli (1585–1653), Italian painter of the Baroque period
- Angelo Carosi (born 1964), Italian long-distance runner
- Angelo Carossino (1929–2020), Italian politician
- Angelo Carrara (born 1954), Italian biathlete
- Angelo Carusone (born 1982), American author and president of Media Matters for America
- Angelo Castillo, American politician
- Angelo Castro Jr. (1945–2012), Filipino journalist
- Angelo Cataldi (born 1951), American sportcaster based in Philadelphia
- Angelo Cattaneo (1901–1985), Italian cyclist
- Angelo Cavalluzzo (born 1993), Canadian soccer player
- Angelo Michele Cavazzoni (1672–1743), Italian painter and engraver
- Angelo Celli (1857–1914), Italian physician and zoologist who studied malaria
- Angelo Cemmi (1908–1980), Italian politician
- Angelo Cerasi (1643–1728), Italian Roman Catholic prelate
- Angelo Cereser (born 1944), Italian footballer
- Angelo Cerica (1885–1961), Italian general and senator
- Angelo Cesi, multiple people
- Angelo Cesselon (1922–1992), Italian poster painter
- Angelo Chaves (born 2001), Brazilian footballer
- Angelo Chol (born 1993), South Sudanese basketball player
- Angelo Ciccone (born 1980), Italian cyclist
- Angelo Ciocca (born 1975), Italian politician
- Angelo Cipolloni (born 1970), Italian sprinter
- Angelo Codevilla (1943–2021), Italian-U.S. professor, civil servant, and author
- Angelo Coia (1938–2013), American football player
- Angelo Colarossi (1875–1949), British model
- Angelo Colinelli (1925–2011), French cyclist
- Angelo Colombo (born 1961), Italian footballer
- Angelo Michele Colonna (1604–1687), Italian painter
- Angelo Comastri (born 1943), Italian prelate
- Angelo Comolli (1863–1949), Italian painter
- Angelo Compagnoni (1921–2018), Italian politician
- Angelo Confalonieri (1813–1848), Italian missionary
- Angelo Congear (1885–1986), Australian rules footballer
- Angelo Constantino (died 2019), Filipino bowler
- Angelo Conterno (1925–2007), Italian cyclist
- Angelo Copeta (1919–1980), Italian Grand Prix motorcycle road racer
- Angelo Corrao, Italian-American film and television editor
- Angelo Corsi (born 1989), Italian footballer
- Angelo Costanzo (born 1976), Australian soccer player
- Angelo Craig (born 1985), American gridiron football player
- Angelo Crema (born 1941), Australian rugby league player
- Angelo Crescenzo (born 1993), Italian karateka
- Angelo Crowell (born 1981), American football player
- Angelo Cruz (born 1958), Puerto Rican professional basketball player
- Angelo Cruz Ramos, Puerto Rican politician
- Angelo D. Roncallo (1927–2010), American politician
- Angelo da Clareno, Italian priest
- Angelo da Costa (born 1983), Brazilian footballer
- Angelo da Fonseca (1902–1967), Indian painter
- Ângelo Moniz da Silva Ferraz, Baron of Uruguaiana (1812–1867), Brazilian politician
- Angelo Dagres (1934–2017), American baseball player
- Angelo Dalle Molle, Italian businessman and Utopian philanthropist
- Angelo Dall'Oca Bianca (1858–1942), Italian painter
- Angelo Davids (born 1999), South African rugby union player
- Angelo Davoli (1896–1978), Italian middle-distance runner
- Angelo Dawkins (born 1990), American professional wrestler
- Angelo Dayu Agor, South Sudanese politician
- Angelo De Augustine, American musician
- Angelo De Donatis (born 1954), Italian catholic prelate
- Angelo de Gubernatis (1840–1913), Italian art critic and writer
- Angelo De Martini (1897–1979), Italian cyclist
- Angelo de Mojana di Cologna (1905–1988), 77th Prince and Grand Master of the Sovereign Military Order of Malta
- Angelo Debarre (born 1962), Romani (Gypsy) guitarist in the manouche jazz style
- Angelo DeCarlo (1902–1973), American mobster
- Angelo Del Boca (1925–2021), Italian historian
- Angelo Del Toro (1947–1994), New York politician
- Angelo Dell'Acqua (1903–1972), Italian cardinal
- Angelo Dessy (1907–1983), Italian actor
- Angelo Di Castro (1925–2012), Italian sculptor
- Angelo di Costanzo (1507–1591), Italian historian and poet
- Angelo Di Livio (born 1966), Italian footballer
- Angelo Di Pietro, Italian engineer
- Angelo DiBernardo (born 1956), Argentine-American soccer player and coach
- Angelo Dibona (1879–1956), Italian mountaineer
- Angelo DiGeorge (1921–2009), Italian American physician and pediatric endocrinologist
- Angelo Dolci (1867–1939), Italian prelate
- Angelo Dolfini (born 1978), Italian figure skater
- Angelo Domenghini (born 1941), Italian footballer and manager
- Ângelo Domingos Salvador (1932–2022), Roman Catholic prelate
- Angelo Donati (1885–1960), Jewish Italian banker and philanthropist
- Angelo Donghia (1935–1985), American interior designer
- Angelo Dos Santos (born 1940), Brazilian musician
- Angelo Drossos (1928–1997), American basketball executive
- Angelo Dundee (1921–2012), American boxing trainer
- Angelo Duro (born 1982), Italian comedian and actor
- Angelo Earl, American musician
- Angelo Elia (born 1957), Swiss footballer
- Angelo Emo (1731–1792), last Grand Admiral of the Republic of Venice
- Angelo Encarnación (born 1969), Dominican baseball player
- Angelo Ephrikian (1913–1982), Italian musicologist and violinist of Armenian descent
- Angelo Erba (1889–1967), Italian cyclist
- Angelo Errichetti (1928–2013), American politician
- Angelo Espinosa, Chilean footballer
- Angelo Esposito (rugby union) (born 1993), Italian former rugby union player
- Angelo Esposito (born 1989), Canadian ice hockey player
- Angelo Evelyn (1942–2023), Canadian artist
- Angelo Everardi (1647–1680), Italian painter of the Baroque period
- Angelo F. Greco (1925–2004), American lawyer and politician
- Angelo F. Orazio (1926–2018), American politician
- Angelo Fabroni (1732–1803), Italian biographer and historian
- Angelo Fagiani (1943–2020), Italian priest
- Angelo Falcón (1951–2018), Puerto Rican political scientist
- Angelo Fantoni (1903–1992), Italian priest and exorcist
- Angelo Farrugia (born 1955), Maltese politician
- Angelo Faticoni (1859–1931), professional freakshow artist and contortionist
- Angelo Felici (1919–2007), Italian cardinal
- Angelo Ferrari (1897–1954), Italian actor
- Angelo Ferrario (1908–1997), Italian sprinter
- Angelo Ferri (1815–1874), Italian politician
- Angelo Fields (born 1957), American football player
- Angelo Fierro, American film and television actor
- Angelo Filippetti, Italian politician
- Angelo Fioretti (1918–2001), Italian rower
- Angelo Francesco Lavagnino (1909–1987), Italian composer
- Angelo Franzosi (1921–2010), Italian footballer
- Angelo Frattini (1910–1975), Italian sculptor
- Angelo Frigerio, Italian bobsledder
- Angelo Frisa (1904–1968), Italian engineer
- Angelo Froglia (1955–1997), Italian painter
- Angelo Frosi (1924–1995), Italian clergyman and auxiliary bishop
- Angelo Fulgini (born 1996), French footballer
- Angelo Furlan (born 1977), Italian professional road bicycle racer
- Angelo Fusco (politician) (born 1953), American politician
- Angelo Fusco (born 1956), Provisional Irish Republican Army member
- Angelo G. Santaniello (1924–2015), American judge
- Ângelo Gabriel (born 2004), Brazilian footballer
- Ángelo Gabrielli (born 1992), Uruguayan footballer
- Ângelo Gammaro (1895–1977), Brazilian swimmer and water polo player
- Angelo Garcia (born 1976), Puerto Rican singer (ex-member of Menudo)
- Angelo Garzio, Italian-American potter
- Angelo Gattermayer (born 2002), Austrian footballer
- Angelo Gavillucci, Canadian sledge hockey player
- Angelo Gelsomini (1932–2021), Italian wrestler
- Angelo Genna (1898–1925), American bootlegger
- Angelo Genocchi (1817–1889), Italian mathematician
- Angelo Genuin (born 1939), former Italian ski mountaineer and cross-country skier
- Angelo Geraldini (1422–1486), Italian humanist and diplomat, who became a bishop
- A. Bartlett Giamatti (1938–1989), American baseball commissioner and academic administrator
- Angelo Alberto Giani (1955–2006), Italian sport shooter
- Angelo Gigli (born 1983), Italian basketball player
- Angelo Gilardino (1941–2022), Italian composer, guitarist and musicologist
- Angelo Giori (1586–1662), Italian Catholic Cardinal
- Ângelo Girão (born 1989), Portuguese roller hockey player
- Angelo Giuseppe Roncalli (1881–1963), Pope John XXIII
- Angelo Giustiniani (died 1600), Italian Roman Catholic bishop
- Angelo Glisoni (born 1957), Italian yacht racer
- Angelo Gottarelli (1740–1813), Italian painter
- Angelo Gozzadini, 17th-century Italian Roman Catholic bishop
- Angelo Gregorio (born 1991), Italian footballer
- Angelo Gregucci (born 1964), Italian footballer and coach
- Angelo Gremo (1887–1940), Italian cyclist
- Angelo Grillo (1557–1629), Italian Baroque poet
- Angelo Grimaldi (c. 1630–1682), Roman Catholic prelate
- Angelo Grizzetti (1916–1998), Italian footballer and coach
- Angelo Groppelli (born 1946), Italian shot putter
- Angelo Guatta (1907–1993), Italian racing driver
- Angelo Guidi (1888–1953), Italian cyclist
- Angelo Haligiannis, managed the hedge fund Sterling Watters as a Ponzi scheme
- Angelo Hauk (born 1984), Italian-German footballer
- Angelo Heilprin (1853–1907), American geologist, paleontologist, naturalist and explorer
- Angelo Henderson (1962–2014), American journalist
- Ángelo Henríquez (born 1994), Chilean footballer
- Angelo Herndon (1913–1997), American labor organizer
- Angelo Hesnard (1886–1969), French born psychiatrist and psychoanalyst
- Angelo Hugues (born 1966), French footballer
- Angelo Iachino (1889–1976), Italian admiral
- Angelo Iacono (born 1965), Canadian politician and lawyer
- Angelo Iannelli (runner) (born 1976), Italian athletics competitor
- Angelo Iannuzzelli (born 1970), Salvadoran long jumper
- Angelo Ibarra (born 1999), Argentine footballer
- Angelo Infanti (1939–2010), Italian film actor
- Angelo Inganni (1807–1880), Italian painter
- Angelo Ingrassia (1923–2013), American jurist
- Angelo Michele Iorio (born 1948), Italian politician
- Angelo Iorio (born 1982), Italian footballer
- Angelo Ippolito (1922–2001), American painter
- Angelo Italia (1628–1700), Sicilian Jesuit and Baroque architect
- Angelo Izzo, Italian pharmacologist
- Angelo J. Arculeo (1924–2013), American lawyer
- Angelo J. LaPietra (1920–1999), American gangster
- Angelo Jank (1868–1940), German painter
- Angelo Jannone, Italian military commandant
- Angelo Jayasinghe (born 1993), Sri Lankan cricketer
- Angelo Jimenez, Filipino lawyer
- Angelo Keder (born 1955), Swedish contemporary artist
- Angelo Kelly-Rosales (born 1993), Honduran footballer
- Angelo King (born 1958), American football player
- Angelo Kinicki, American academic
- Angelo Konstantinou (born 1978), Australian futsal player
- Angelo La Barbera (1924–1975), member of the Sicilian Mafia
- Angelo La Naia (1884–1968), Italian painter
- Angelo Lano, American FBI agent who headed the Watergate investigation
- Angelo Leaupepe (born 1997), New Zealand rugby union player
- Angelo Lecchi (born 1966), Italian cyclist
- Angelo Lekkas (born 1976), Australian rules footballer
- Angelo Leo (born 1994), American boxer
- Angelo LiPetri (1929–2016), American baseball player
- Angelo Litrico (1927–1986), Italian fashion designer
- Angelo Lo Forese (1920–2020), Italian tenor
- Angelo Locci (born 1962), Italian hurdler
- Angelo Lonardo (1911–2006), American mobster
- Angelo Longoni (1933–1993), Italian footballer
- Angelo Lopeboselli (born 1977), Italian cyclist
- Angelo Lorenzetti (born 1964), Italian volleyball coach
- Angelo Loukakis, Australian author
- Angelo Loukas (born 1947), Greek-born American football player
- Angelo Lucena (born 2003), Venezuelan footballer
- Ângelo Luiz (born 1971), Brazilian football player and coach
- Angelo Lutz, professional chef and former mobster
- Angelo Luzzani (1896–1960), Italian footballer and lawyer
- Angelo Maccagnino, Italian painter
- Angelo Madsen Minax, American film director
- Angelo Maffucci (1847–1903), Italian pathologist
- Angelo Maggi (born 1955), Italian actor and voice actor
- Angelo Mai (1782–1854), Italian Cardinal and philologist
- Angelo Malvicini (1895–1949), Italian long-distance runner
- Angelo Mancuso, multiple people
- Angelo Mangiarotti (1921–2012), Italian architect and industrial designer
- Angelo Mangione, Italian taekwondo practitioner
- Angelo Mannironi (born 1961), Italian weightlifter
- Angelo Manzotti, Italian opera singer
- Angelo Marasigan (born 1992), Filipino footballer and TikToker
- Angelo Marchetti, Italian mathematician and cosmographer
- Angelo Marchi (born 1950), Italian footballer
- Angelo Marciani (1928–2022), Italian water polo player
- Ângelo Marcos da Silva (born 1975), Brazilian footballer
- Angelo Marcuzzi, Roman Catholic bishop
- Angelo Maria Amorevoli (1716–1798), Italian opera singer
- Angelo Maria Angeli, Prince of Macedonia and Thessaly
- Angelo Maria Bandinelli, Italian statesman
- Angelo Maria Bandini (1726–1803), Italian writer
- Angelo Maria Benincori (1779–1821), Italian composer
- Angelo Maria Cicolani (1952–2012), Italian politician
- Angelo Maria Mazzia (1823–1891), Italian painter
- Angelo Maria Quirini (1680–1755), Italian Cardinal of the Roman Catholic Church
- Angelo Maria Ripellino (1923–1978), Italian translator, poet, linguist and academic
- Angelo Maria Rivato (1924–2011), Roman Catholic bishop of Ponta de Pedras, Brazil
- Angelo Maria Scaccia (1690–1761), Italian composer and violinist
- Angelo Mariani, multiple people
- Angelo Marino (1956–2018), Italian art dealer and curator
- Angelo Marotta (born 1937), American politician
- Angelo Martha (born 1982), Dutch-Curaçaoan footballer
- Ángelo Martino (born 1998), Argentine footballer
- Angelo Martino Colombo (1935–2014), Italian footballer
- Ângelo Martins (1930–2020), Portuguese footballer
- Angelo Mascheroni (1855–1905), pianist composer, conductor and music teacher
- Angelo Masci (1758–1821), Arbëresh jurist and scholar
- Angelo Massafra (born 1949), Italian priest
- Angelo Massarotti (1653–1723), Italian painter
- Angelo Massimino, Italian entrepreneur
- Angelo Massone, Italian lawyer
- Angelo Mathews (born 1987), Sri Lankan cricketer
- Angelo Mattea (1892–1960), Italian footballer
- Angelo Mauri (1873–1936), Italian journalist and politician
- Angelo Maurizi (born 2000), Italian rugby union player
- Angelo Mayer (born 1996), German footballer
- Angelo Mazza (1741–1817), Italian neoclassical poet
- Angelo Agostini Mazzinghi (c. 1385–1438), Italian Roman Catholic priest
- Angelo Mazzoni (born 1961), Italian fencer
- Angelo Medina (born 1959), Puerto Rican music executive
- Angelo Meli (1897–1969), Italian-American mobster
- Ângelo Meneses (born 1993), Portuguese footballer
- Angelo Menon (1919–2013), Italian cyclist
- Angelo Messedaglia (1820–1901), Italian politician
- Angelo Miceli (born 1994), Canadian-born Italian ice hockey player
- Angelo Minghetti (1822–1885), Italian ceramist and painter of maiolica pieces
- Angelo Montemurro (1893–1983), Canadian politician
- Angelo Monticelli (1778–1837), Italian neoclassical painter
- Angelo Montrone, American songwriter
- Angelo Moore (born 1965), American musician
- Angelo Morales, Filipino lawn bowler
- Angelo Moratti (1909–1981), Italian oil tycoon
- Angelo Morbelli (1853–1919), Italian painter of the Divisionist style
- Ângelo Moreira da Costa Lima (1887–1964), Brazilian entomologist
- Angelo Moreschi (1952–2020), Italian bishop
- Angelo Moretti (1925–2004), Italian sprinter
- Angelo Morinello, American politician
- Angelo Moriondo (1851–1914), Italian inventor
- Angelo Mosca Jr., American professional wrestler
- Angelo Mosca (1937–2021), wrestler and Canadian Football Player
- Angelo Mosso (1846–1910), 19th-century Italian physiologist
- Angelo Motta (1890–1957), Italian entrepreneur, founder of the food company Motta
- Angelo Mouzouris (born 2001), Australian racing driver
- Angelo Mozilo (1938–2023), CEO of Countrywide Financial until July 1, 2008
- Angelo Mozzillo, Italian painter
- Angelo Munzone (1933–2017), Italian politician
- Angelo Muscat (1930–1977), Maltese-born film and television character actor
- Angelo Musco (1872–1937), Italian actor
- Angelo Musi (1918–2009), American basketball player
- Angelo Musone (born 1963), Italian boxer
- Angelo Nannoni (1715–1790), Italian surgeon and author
- Angelo Nardi (1584–1665), Italian painter
- Angelo Nardinocchi (1943–2025), Italian operatic bass-baritone
- Angelo Ndrecka (born 2001), Albanian footballer
- Angelo Nehmé (born 2004), Danish footballer
- Ângelo Neto (born 1991), Brazilian footballer
- Angelo Neumann (1838–1910), German author, opera singer and director
- Angelo Nicolini (1505–1567), Italian Roman Catholic bishop and cardinal
- Angelo Nicotra (1948–2024), Italian actor and voice actor
- Angelo Niculescu (1921–2015), Romanian footballer and manager
- Angelo Nijskens (born 1963), Dutch footballer
- Angelo Nikolopoulos (born 1981), American poet
- Angelo Novi (1930–1997), Italian photographer and film actor
- Angelo Oddi, Canadian composer, songwriter, and producer
- Angelo Ogbonna (born 1988), Italian footballer
- Angelo Oliviero Olivetti (1874–1931), Italian revolutionary syndicalist
- Angelo Orazi (born 1951), Italian footballer and coach
- Angelo Orlando (born 1965), Italian footballer and coach
- Angelo P. Graham (1932–2017), American art director
- Ángelo Padilla (born 1988), Guatemalan footballer
- Angelo Pagani (born 1988), Italian bicycle racer
- Angelo Paggi (1789–1867), Italian philosopher
- Angelo Pagotto (born 1973), Italian footballer
- Angelo Paina (1949–2024), Italian footballer
- Ángelo Paleso (born 1983), Uruguayan footballer
- Angelo Palmas (1914–2003), Italian prelate
- Angelo Palombo (born 1981), Italian footballer
- Angelo Panelli (1887–1967), Italian stamp forger
- Angelo Panzetta (born 1967), American soccer player and coach
- Angelo Paolanti (born 1959), Italian footballer
- Angelo Paoli (1642–1720), Italian Carmelite, known as "the father of the poor"
- Angelo Paradiso (born 1977), Italian footballer
- Angelo Paravisi (1930–2004), bishop of Crema
- Angelo Parisi (born 1953), French judoka and olympic champion
- Angelo Parona (1889–1977), Italian admiral
- Angelo Parra (born 1948), American dramatist
- Angelo Pascal (1858–1888), Italian painter
- Angelo Pasolini (1905–1959), Italian footballer
- Angelo Passaleva (born 1933), Italian politician
- Angelo Paternoster (1919–2012), American football player
- Angelo Patri (1876–1965), Italian-American author and educator
- Angelo Pedroni (canoeist) (born 1943), Italian canoeist
- Angelo Pedroni (nuncio) (1914–1992), Italian prelate of the Catholic Church
- Angelo Pellegrini (1904–1991), American writer and professor
- Ángelo Peña (born 1989), Venezuelan footballer
- Angelo Pereni (died 2020), Italian footballer and coach
- Angelo Perera (born 1990), Sri Lankan cricketer
- Angelo Persia (born 1998), Italian footballer
- Angelo Persichilli (born 1948), Italian born Canadian journalist and newspaper editor
- Angelo Perugini (1955–2021), Brazilian politician
- Angelo Peruzzi (born 1970), Italian footballer
- Angelo Petraglia (footballer) (born 1963), Australian rules footballer
- Angelo Petraglia (born 1954), American record producer and songwriter
- Angelo Piccaluga (1906–1993), Italian footballer
- Angelo Picchetti (c. 1591–1668), Italian Roman Catholic prelate
- Angelo Pichi (died 1653), Italian Roman Catholic prelate
- Angelo Pietra, Italian economist
- Angelo Pietrasanta (1837–1876), Italian painter
- Angelo Piò (1690–1770), Bolognese sculptor
- Angelo Pirotta (1894–1956), Maltese philosopher
- Angelo Pisani, Roman Catholic bishop
- Angelo Pizzetti (born 1963), Italian footballer
- Angelo Pizzi (1775–1819), Italian sculptor
- Angelo Pizzo, American screenwriter and film producer
- Ángelo Pizzorno (born 1992), Uruguayan footballer
- Angelo Poffo (1925–2010), American professional wrestler and wrestling promoter
- Angelo Policardi (1888–1943), Italian general
- Angelo Polledri (1904–1997), Italian coxswain
- Angelo Ponte (1924–2017), American mobster
- Angelo Porcel (born 1954), Bolivian politician
- Angelo Portelli (1852–1927), Catholic bishop
- Angelo Prisco (1939–2017), American mobster
- Angelo Puccinelli, Italian painter
- Angelo Puglisi, Australian winemaker
- Angelo Puppolo, politician from Springfield, Massachusetts (Republican)
- Angelo Quaglio (1829–1890), German stage designer of Italian descent
- Angelo Que (born 1978), Filipino professional golfer
- Angelo Quinto (1990–2020), Asian-American man killed by police
- Angelo Raffaele Dinardo (1932–2015), Italian politician
- Angelo Raffaele Jervolino (1890–1985), Italian politician
- Angelo Raffin (born 1946), Canadian football player
- Angelo Ramazzotti (1800–1861), Patriarch of Venice
- Angelo Raso (born 1981), Italian footballer
- Angelo Rea (born 1982), Italian footballer
- Angelo Recchi (born 1951), Italian footballer
- Angelo Reyes (1945–2011), Filipino retired general and politician
- Angelo Reyes (basketball) (born 1981), Puerto Rican basketball player
- Angelo Ribossi (1822–1886), Italian painter
- Angelo Rinaldi (1940–2025), French writer and literary critic
- Angelo Rizzoli (1889–1970), Italian publisher and film producer
- Angelo Rizzoli (1943–2013), Italian publisher and producer
- Angelo Rizzuto (1906–1967), American photographer
- Angelo Rocca (1545–1620), Italian librarian and bishop
- Ángelo Rodríguez (born 1989), Colombian footballer
- Angelo Romani (1934–2003), Italian swimmer
- Angelo Roncalli (1881–1963), The Head of the Roman Catholic Church, also known as Pope John XXIII
- Angelo Ross (1911–1989), American film editor and sound engineer
- Angelo Rossetto (1946–2022), Italian rower
- Angelo Rossi, multiple people
- Angelo Rossitto (1908–1991), American actor of Italian descent
- Angelo Rotta (1872–1965), Apostolic Nuncio in Budapest
- Angelo Rottoli (1958–2020), Italian boxer
- Angelo Rovegno (born 1999), Peruvian footballer
- Angelo Ruffini (1864–1929), Italian histologist and embryologist
- Angelo Ruggiero (1940–1989), Italian-American mobster
- Angelo Ruiz (born 1957), Puerto Rican judoka
- Angelo Russo (born 1961), Italian theatre and television actor
- Ángelo Sagal (born 1993), Chilean footballer
- Angelo Sala (1576–1637), Italian physician and chemist
- Angelo Sanchez, American mixed martial arts fighter
- Angelo Sangiacomo (1924–2015), American real estate developer
- Angelo Santabarbara (born 1972), American politician
- Angelo Santana (born 1988), Cuban boxer
- Angelo Santucci (born 1951), Canadian football player
- Angelo Sarzetti, Italian painter
- Angelo Savelli (1911–1995), Italian painter
- Angelo Saviano (born 1958), American politician
- Angelo Savoldi (1914–2013), Italian/American professional wrestler
- Angelo Scaccia (born 1942), American politician
- Angelo Scalzone (1931–1987), Italian sports shooter
- Angelo Schiavio (1905–1990), Italian footballer
- Angelo Schirinzi (born 1972), Swiss beach soccer player and coach
- Angelo Scola (born 1941), Italian cardinal, philosopher and theologian
- Angelo Scuri (born 1959), Italian fencer
- Angelo Secchi (1818–1878), Italian astronomer
- Angelo Segrillo (born 1958), Brazilian historian
- Angelo Simmons (born 1987), Bermudan footballer
- Angelo Simon (born 1974), Tanzanian long-distance runner
- Angelo Simone (born 1986), Belgian footballer
- Angelo Siniscalchi (born 1984), Italian footballer
- Angelo Smith (born 2000), Fijian rugby union player
- Angelo Snipes (born 1963), American football player
- Angelo Sodano (1937–2022), Italian Roman Catholic cardinal
- Angelo Soliman (c. 1721–1796), Afro-Austrian intellectual and freemason
- Angelo Solimena (1629–1716), Italian painter
- Angelo Sormani (born 1939), Italian footballer
- Angelo Sotira (born 1981), American entrepreneur
- Angelo Spanio (1939–1999), Italian footballer
- Angelo Spinillo (born 1951), Italian bishop
- Angelo Staniscia (born 1939), Italian politician
- Angelo Stano (born 1953), Italian comic book artist
- Angelo Starr, American singer, musician and record producer
- Angelo Stiller (born 2001), German footballer
- Angelo Tafa (born 2000), Albanian footballer
- Angelo Talia (born 2003), Italian footballer
- Angelo Tantsis (born 1958), Australian rules footballer
- Angelo Tarchi, multiple people
- Angelo Tartaglia (footballer) (born 1992), Italian footballer
- Angelo Tartaglia, Italian condottiero and nobleman
- Angelo Tasca (1892–1960), Italian politician, writer and historian
- Angelo Tavanti (1714–c. 1782), Italian lawyer and statesman
- Ângelo Taveira (born 2000), Portuguese footballer
- Angelo Taylor (born 1978), American athlete, Olympic gold medalist, coach, suspended by SafeSport for sexual misconduct
- Angelo Thomas Acerra (1925–1990), Roman Catholic bishop
- Angelo Tommasi (1911–2004), Italian high jumper
- Angelo Michele Toni (1640–1708), Italian painter
- Angelo Tonini (1888–1974), Italian athlete
- Angelo Torchi (1856–1915), Italian painter
- Angelo Torres (born 1932), American cartoonist and caricaturist
- Angelo Torricelli (born 1946), Italian architect
- Angelo Toselli, Italian painter
- Angelo Tozzi (born 1949), Italian swimmer
- Angelo Traina (1889–1971), Biblical scholar
- Angelo Trevisani (1669–1753), Italian painter
- Angelo Trezzini (1827–1904), Italian painter
- Angelo Tsagarakis (born 1984), French professional basketball guard
- Angelo Tsakopoulos (born 1936), American businessman
- Angelo Tsarouchas (born 1976), Canadian comedian
- Angelo Tsirekas, Australian politician
- Angelo Tulik (born 1990), French cyclist
- Angelo Tumino, Italian novelist and poet
- Angelo Turconi (1923–2011), Italian footballer
- Angelo Vaccarezza (born 1965), Italian politician
- Angelo Vaccaro (born 1981), German-born Italian footballer
- Angelo Valle (1851–1926), Italian politician
- Angelo Vanzin (1932–2018), Italian rower
- Ângelo Varela (born 1980), Portuguese footballer
- Angelo Varetto (1910–2001), Italian cyclist
- Angelo Vassallo (1953–2010), Italian politician
- Angelo Vassallo (water polo), Italian water polo player
- Angelo Vasta (1941–2021), Australian judge
- Angelo Veccia (born 1963), Italian operatic baritone
- Angelo Vega Rodriguez, Swedish footballer and futsal player
- Ângelo Veloso (1930–1990), Portuguese politician
- Angelo Venosa (1948–2022), Brazilian sculptor
- Angelo Venturoli (1749–1821), Italian architect
- Angelo Vergecio, Greek copyist
- Angelo Vermeulen (born 1971), Belgian visual artist and scientist
- Angelo Vicardi (1937–2006), Italian gymnast
- Ângelo Victoriano (1968–2024), Angolan basketball player
- Angelo Vier (born 1972), German footballer
- Angelo Visconti (1829–1861), Italian painter
- Angelo Vistoli (born 1958), Italian mathematician
- Angelo Viva (1748–1837), Italian sculptor
- Angelo Weiss (born 1969), Italian former alpine skier
- Angelo Zanelli (1879–1942), Italian sculptor
- Angelo Vincenzo Zani (born 1950), Italian prelate and Vatican official
- Angelo Zankl (1901–2007), O.S.B., the longest professed Benedictine monk (86 years)
- Angelo Ziccardi (1928–2019), Italian politician
- Angelo Zorzi (1890–1974), Italian gymnast
- Angelo Zottoli (1826–1902), Italian Catholic priest and missionary in China
- Angelo Zucca (born 1955), Italian gymnast
- Pier Angelo Basili (died 1604), Italian painter of the 16th-century Renaissance

=== People with the surname ===
- Alfred Angelo, retailer of bridal gowns in Pennsylvania
- Domenico Angelo (1717–1802), British fencing master and founder of the Angelo Family
- Edmond Angelo (1913–1983), American theatre and film producer
- Edward Angelo (1870–1948), Australian politician
- Henry Angelo (1756–1835), British fencing master and memoirist. Son of Domenico Angelo
- Henry Charles Angelo the Younger (1780–1852), British fencing master. Son of Henry Angelo
- Ivan Ângelo (born 1936), Brazilian writer
- Jeff Angelo (born 1964), Iowa politician
- Jerry Angelo (born 1949), Chicago Bears general manager
- Mark Angelo (born 1951), Canadian conservationist
- Nancy Angelo (born 1953), organizational psychologist
- Richard Angelo (born 1962), Serial killer and former nurse at the Good Samaritan Hospital in New York
- Tommy Angelo (born 1958), American poker player, writer, and coach
- Tony Angelo (born 1978), American drifting pioneer
- Valenti Angelo (1897–1982), Italian-American printmaker, illustrator and author
- Yves Angelo (born 1956), French cinematographer and film director

== Fictional characters ==
=== Given name ===
- Angelo (Final Fantasy VIII), a character in the video game Final Fantasy VIII
- Angelo (Measure for Measure), a character in the William Shakespeare play Measure for Measure
- Angelo (The Comedy of Errors), a character in the William Shakespeare play The Comedy of Errors
- Angelo, a fictional character in Dragon Quest VIII
- Angelo, the titular fictional character and protagonist of the TV series Angelo Rules
- Angelo, a character on The Pretender, portrayed by Paul Dillon
- Angelo Bend, the Angle Man, a Wonder Woman's foe
- Angelo Bronte, supporting antagonist in Red Dead Redemption 2
- Angelo Buscetta, the main antagonist of The Sopranos: Road to Respect
- Angelo Espinosa (Skin), a mutant character in Marvel Comics
- Anjuro "Angelo" Katagiri, a minor antagonist of Diamond Is Unbreakable
- Angelo Lagusa, the fictional character and protagonist of the anime 91 Days
- Angelo Owens, a One-Niner lieutenant seen in The Shield, e.g., season 6 episode 4: "The New Guy"
- Angelo, a brawler in the video game Brawl Stars
- Angelo, a character from the horror comic series Witch Creek Road

=== Surname ===
- Tommy Angelo, protagonist of Mafia and Mafia: Definitive Edition, and a minor character in Mafia II

== See also ==
- D'Angelo (given name)
- D'Angelo (surname)
