= Zankl =

Zankl is a surname. Notable people with the surname include:

- Angelo Zankl (1901–2007), American monk and centenarian
- Karl Zankl (died 1945), Austrian footballer and manager
