= Luzzani =

Luzzani is an Italian surname. Notable people with the surname include:

- Angelo Luzzani (1896–1960), Italian lawyer and footballer
- Giancarlo Luzzani (1912–1991), Swiss field hockey player
