= Ingrassia =

- Pronunciation: Italian: [iŋɡrasˈsiː.a]
- Language: Italian

Origin
- Languages: Italian, Spanish
- Derivation: in + García
- Region of origin: Sicily

Ingrassia is an Italian surname. Notable people with the surname include:

- Angelo Ingrassia, (1923–2013), American jurist
- Anthony Ingrassia (1944–1995), American theatre director, producer and playwright
- Ciccio Ingrassia (1922–2003), Italian actor, comedian and film director
- Frankie Ingrassia, American actress
- Giampiero Ingrassia (born 1961), Italian actor
- Giovanni Filippo Ingrassia (1510–1580), Italian physician and anatomist
- Giuseppe Ingrassia, (born 1988), Italian footballer
- Julien Ingrassia, (born 1979), French rally co-driver
- Paul Ingrassia, (1950–2019), American journalist
- Paul Ingrassia (born 1995), American attorney
