= Bertolazzi =

Bertolazzi is an Italian surname. Notable people with the surname include:

- Alessandro Bertolazzi (born 1958), Italian makeup artist
- Angelo Bertolazzi (1896–1963), Italian sculptor
