= Paggi =

Paggi is a surname. Notable people with the name include:

- Angelo Paggi (1789–1867), Italian Jewish Hebraist, philologist and educator
- Fernando Paggi (1914–1973), Swiss conductor and musician
- Giovanni Battista Paggi (1554–1627), Italian painter
- Giovanni Battista Paggi (bishop), (1615–1663), Italian Roman Catholic bishop
- Nicole Paggi (born 1977), American actress
- Paola Paggi (born 1976), Italian volleyball player
- Simona Paggi, Italian film editor
