= Pavolini =

Pavolini is a surname. Notable people with the surname include:

- Alessandro Pavolini (1903–1945), Italian politician, journalist and essayist
- Corrado Pavolini (1898–1980), Italian writer
- Paolo Emilio Pavolini (1864–1942), Italian poet

== See also ==
- Pasolini (surname)
