= Pasolini (surname) =

Pasolini is an Italian surname. Notable people with this surname include:

- Angelo Pasolini (1905–1959), Italian football player
- Pier Paolo Pasolini (1922–1975), Italian film director and writer
- Renzo Pasolini (1938–1973), Italian motorcycle road racer
- Uberto Pasolini (born 1957), Italian film producer and director
- Roberto Pasolini (born 1971), Italian Catholic priest, Capuchin friar and preacher of the Papal Household
