= Angelo Simone =

Belgian footballer

Personal information
- Full name: Angelo Simone
- Date of birth: 19 December 1986 (age 39)
- Place of birth: Genk, Belgium
- Height: 1.83 m (6 ft 0 in)
- Position: Midfielder

Team information
- Current team: DESO
- Number: 21

Youth career
- Racing Genk

Senior career*
Years	Team	Apps	(Gls)
2004–2010	Fortuna Sittard	168	(1)
2010–2013	FC Oss	54	(1)
2013–2014	VVA '71	?	(?)
2014	DESO	?	(?)
2014–????	FC Oss	?	(?)
- * Club domestic league appearances and goals as of 1 January 2016

Angelo Simone (born 19 December 1986 in Genk) is a former Belgian professional footballer who plays as a midfielder for RKVV DESO. He formerly played for Fortuna Sittard and FC Oss.
