= Angelo Boucheron =

Italian painter and engraver

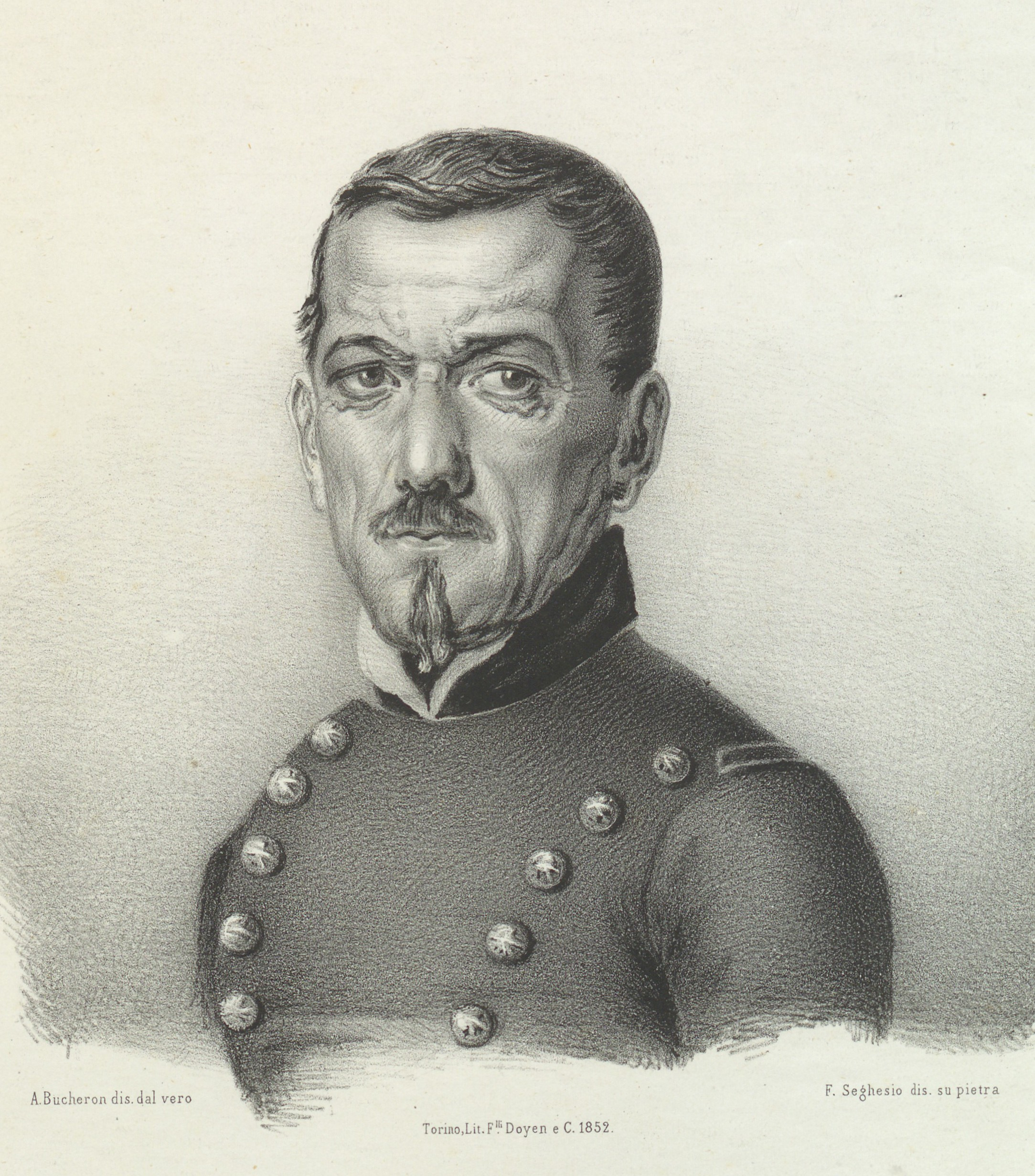
Portrait of Paolo Sacchi by Angelo Bucheron, 1852

Angelo Boucheron (circa 1780 – 1 February 1859) was an Italian painter and engraver.

He studied sculpture and engraving under his father. His brother was professor of eloquence at university and of history of art at academy and for the military academy. On March 19, 1796, Boucheron was approved as architect by university of Turin. In the following years, he had made his way to Rome, but the times were turbulent. Boucheron had stayed in Rome during the brief French-sponsored Republic (1798–99) and even joined its military corps. Canova had fled from Rome during this time.

He returns to Turin by the turn of the century. By 1811, he had been named professor of design at the school of Monte (dei Cappuccini) of Turin. His main productions at the time were busts, for example, of Homer and of Giovanni Battista Beccaria. He also made copies and engravings of artworks, and pen-drawn portraits colored in acquaforte.

In 1812 he exhibited a series of drawings to the exhibition of arts and manufactures in Italy, and two years later, a portrait of King Vittorio Emanuele in addition to the Return of the King in Turin, which was then engraved by Faustino Anderloni. In 1816 he was appointed professor of drawing the Military Academy in Turin. In 1817 he married Margaret Adelaide Bernero, daughter of the court painter Luigi Bernero (1775–1848). In 1820 he exhibited his drawings at the exhibition held at the building of the University of Turin. The April 4, 1823 Carlo Felice granted him the title of designer of the Royal Gallery, with the annual pension of 600 Lire. He was later appointed director of the Accademia Albertina, a member of the Board of Fine Arts, and in 1830, and tutor to the princes Vittorio Emanuele and Ferdinand. In 1839 he was retired from the Military Academy, with pension equal to the salary. He also earned money as a seller of artworks. Among his pupils was the Count Balbiano de Colcavagna.
