= Angelo Rovegno =

Peruvian footballer (born 1999)

Personal information
- Full name: Angelo Benedetto Rovegno Agama
- Date of birth: 28 May 1999 (age 27)
- Place of birth: Lima, Peru
- Height: 1.85 m (6 ft 1 in)
- Position: Centre-back

Team information
- Current team: Western Suburbs
- Number: 25

Youth career
- Alianza Lima

Senior career*
Years	Team	Apps	(Gls)
2018–2020	Alianza Lima	0	(0)
2019	→ Alianza UDH (loan)	11	(0)
2020–2021	Santos de Nasca	15	(1)
2023–2024	Berwick City SC	38	(4)
2024	Knox City FC	18	(1)
2025–	Western Suburbs	13	(0)
- * Club domestic league appearances and goals as of 15:38, 11 October 2025 (UTC)

Angelo Benedetto Rovegno Agama (born 28 May 1999) is a Peruvian footballer who plays as a centre-back for Australian side Western Suburbs.

== Club career ==
=== Alianza Lima ===
Rovegno is a product of Alianza Lima and was promoted to the club's reserve team in 2017. On 28 November 2017 it was confirmed, that Rovegno had signed his first professional contract with Alianza and would be promoted to the first team squad for the 2018 season.

In January 2019, Rovegno went on a trial at Alianza Universidad and indicated, that he wanted to leave Alianza due to lack of opportunities on the first team. However, he ended up joining the club only on a loan deal for the 2019 season. He made a total of 11 appearances for Alianza Universidad. Rovegno returned to Alianza for the 2020 season and continued to play for the club's reserve team.

On 16 September 2020, Rovegno moved to Santos de Nasca on a deal for the rest of 2020. He made five appearances for the club in 2020. He continued at the club in 2021. He left at the end of the year.

=== Australia ===
In 2023, Rovegno joined Australian club Berwick City SC. In the summer 2024, he moved to Knox City FC. In January 2025, Rovegno then joined Western Suburbs.
