= Angelo Tumino =

Italian novelist and poet

Angelo Tumino (born 28 April 1973) is an Italian novelist and musician.

His debut novel Invasione negata ("Denied Invasion") had a great success. Published in 2010, the book sold 50,000 copies, and was noted for its stark depiction of the relationship of Italians and foreigners in the slums of large cities.

Tumino worked for several years as a gondoliere in Venice, which provided the setting for American Gondolier (2012). In 2014 he wrote a novel about Silvio Berlusconi titled L'Invincibile.

In 2023 Tumino made his debut as a singer-songwriter with the single "Re di Roma" dedicated to the Roma footballer Francesco Totti.
