= Angelo Petraglia (footballer) =

Australian rules footballer

Personal information
- Born: 3 June 1963 (age 63)
- Original team: The Basin (EDFL)
- Height: 172 cm (5 ft 8 in)
- Weight: 70 kg (154 lb)

Playing career^{1}
Years	Club	Games (Goals)
1984	North Melbourne	5 (5)
1985–1989	Footscray	49 (56)
Total		54 (61)
- ^{1} Playing statistics correct to the end of 1989.

Angelo Petraglia (born 3 June 1963) is a former Australian rules footballer who played with North Melbourne and Footscray in the Victorian Football League (VFL).

Petraglia, whose parents were both born in Italy, played his early football at The Basin in the Eastern District Football League and was a North Melbourne Under 19s player. A rover, Petraglia made five senior appearances for North Melbourne, in the 1984 VFL season. North Melbourne then dropped him from their list and he played for Port Melbourne in 1985, before crossing to Footscray later in the year and playing in rounds 17 and 18. Petraglia made 21 appearances for Footscray in the 1986 season, only missing one game. He also kicked 26 goals that year, a career best. In 1987 he was again a regular fixture in the team, with 17 appearances. He injured his knee towards the end of his time at Footscray and retired after 49 games for the club, 54 in league football.
