= Angelo Perugini =

Brazilian politician (1955–2021)

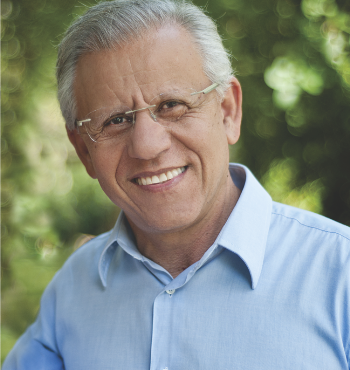
Angelo Perugini

Angelo Augusto Perugini (6 April 1955 in Jacutinga, Minas Gerais – 1 April 2021 in São Paulo) was a Brazilian politician.

== Life ==
He served as Mayor of Hortolândia and was a member of the Legislative Assembly of São Paulo.
