= Angelo Bonomelli =

Italian-Costa Rican surfer (born 1991)

Angelo Bonomelli is an Italian-Costa Rican surfer, born in Varese, Italy in 1991. He was part of the Volcom Europe surf team for years, and was coached by surfing legend Didier Piter. Bonomelli was the first Italian surfer to get good results in the ASP Pro Junior and QS.

Bonomelli is one of the best-known Italian surfers, together with Leonardo Fioravanti.

Career Best Results

- 4th, ISA European Championships, Marrock 2009
- 1st, Analog Challenge 2009
- 2009 Italian Champion
- 3rd, Croyde Salt Rock Open, 2010
- 2nd, Croyde Salt Rock Pro Junior, 2010
- 1st, Analog Challenge, 2010
- 12th, European Pro Junior ranking, 2011
- 5th, Alas Latin Tour, Costa Rica, 2011
- 5th, Somo Pro Junior 2011
- 5th, Canary Island Pro Junior
- 2011, Semifinals, Lacanau Pro Junior, 2011
- 1st, Somo Quiksilver Open, 2012
- 1st, Versilia Surf Trophy, 2012
- Semifinal, Reperchage Eurosurf, Azores, 2013
- 1st, Somo Quiksilver Open Contest, 2013
- 1st, X-Turan Surf Contest, 2013
