= Ângelo Moreira da Costa Lima =

Brazilian entomologist (1887–1964)

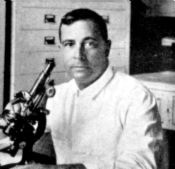
- Born: June 29, 1887; Rio de Janeiro, Neutral Municipality, Empire of Brazil
- Died: 1964; Rio de Janeiro, Guanabara, Brazil
- Known for: "Father of Brazilian entomology"
- Scientific career
- Fields: Entomology
- Institutions: Universidade Federal Rural do Rio de Janeiro
- Author abbrev. (zoology): Costa Lima

Ângelo Moreira da Costa Lima (1887–1964) was the foremost Brazilian entomologist of his time, and his still-consulted works continue to assure his place in the history of science as the "Father" of Brazilian entomology.

== Life ==
Costa Lima, as he is called in Brazil, was born on June 29, 1887, in Rio de Janeiro, Brazil, to Valeriano Moreira da Costa Lima and Rosa Delfina Brum de Lima.

== Works ==
- The legacy of Costa Lima rests on his many contributions to Brazilian entomology. His Terceiro Catálogo was for many years the most consulted work on Brazilian plant-insect associations. It has since been replaced by the Quarto Catálogo that was directly based on Costa Lima's earlier work.
- Costa Lima's Insetos do Brasil in eleven volumes is a valuable resource on Brazilian entomology and is regularly consulted even today.
- Honorary Fellow of the Association for Tropical Biology (and Conservation) 1963,
