= Angelo Nardinocchi =

Italian operatic singer (1943–2025)

- Born: November 27, 1943; Colli del Tronto, Province of Ascoli Piceno, Italy
- Died: March 20, 2025 (aged 81); Rome, Italy
- Education: Conservatorio Santa Cecilia
- Occupation: Operatic bass-baritone

Angelo Nardinocchi (November 27, 1943 – March 20, 2025) was an Italian operatic bass-baritone. Trained at the Conservatorio Santa Cecilia in Rome, he began his career at the Festival dei Due Mondi in Spoleto as Marcello in La bohème by Giacomo Puccini. He often performed the main character in Rigoletto by Giuseppe Verdi, in Italy and internationally. He performed in La Bohème once again at the Israeli Opera, but in the role of Schaunard. He died on March 20, 2025, in Rome, at age 81.
