= Angelo Tantsis =

Australian rules footballer

Personal information
- Full name: Angelo Tantsis
- Born: 3 January 1958 (age 68)
- Original team: St Albans
- Height: 183 cm (6 ft 0 in)
- Weight: 85 kg (187 lb)

Playing career^{1}
Years	Club	Games (Goals)
1978–1979	Footscray	4 (0)
- ^{1} Playing statistics correct to the end of 1979.

Angelo Tantsis (born 3 January 1958) is a former Australian rules footballer who played for the Footscray Football Club in the Victorian Football League (VFL).
