= Angelo Acciaioli =

Angelo Acciaioli may refer to:

- Angelo Acciaioli (bishop) (1298–1357), bishop
- Angelo Acciaioli (cardinal) (1349–1408), cardinal and archbishop of Patras
- Angelo Acciaioli di Cassano (fl. 1467), Italian diplomat

== See also ==
- Acciaioli
