= Angelo Froglia =

Italian painter and sculptor

Angelo Froglia (23 March 1955 – 11 January 1997) was an Italian painter and sculptor mostly known for being involved in the scandal of the sculptures falsely attributed to Amedeo Modigliani in 1984.

== Biography ==
Angelo Froglia was born in Livorno. He attended the Accademia di Belle Arti in Florence. In 1971 he returned to Livorno where he rented a studio and started painting. In 1974 he participated to the 10th edition of the Rome Quadriennale. In 1977, during the Years of Lead, he took part in the armed struggle and ended up in jail. He was released in 1981 and moved back to Livorno where he resumed painting.

In 1984 Froglia sculpted a false Modigliani's head and threw it in the town's canal. The sculpture was initially deemed as authentic before Froglia and others exposed the hoax. Froglia also made a video about the event entitled "Peitho e Apate ... della persuasione e dell'inganno (Cherchez Modi)" and was given an award at the Turin Film Festival in 1984. From 1985 he produced a great number of paintings and organised exhibitions in Italy and abroad, although his health was undermined by an excessive use of recreational drugs. Although Froglia never considered his role in the Modigliani scandal as a "hoax" but rather as an artistic performance, he grew tired of being associated with it. Shortly before his death, Froglia told his friend and art critic Massimo Carboni that, "Time does not count, I work within my possibilities. The important thing is the conviction that you put into it."

Angelo Froglia died following a long illness on 11 January 1997.

== Selected exhibitions ==
- 1974 10th Rome Quadriennale
- 1975 Immagine critica, Casa della Cultura, Livorno
- 1984 L'altro Modigliani, Museo Villa Maria, Livorno
- 1985 Festival Internazionale del Cinema, Turin
- 1992 Mediterranea e altre storie, Galleria Rotini, Livorno
- 1997 Retrospettiva 1973-1996, Maritime Station, Livorno
- 2010 Angelo Ritrovato, Centro Culturale Michon, Livorno

== Notes ==
- 1 Modì, su e-Bay la testa fatta da Froglia. Il Tirreno
- 2 Testa alla Modigliani, parla il fratello del Froglia. artimes.it
