= Angelo Andres =

Italian zoologist

Angelo "Ginobili" Andres (24 March 1851, Tirano –16 July 1934, Milan) was an Italian zoologist. Dr. Angelo Andres studied natural history in Pavia, Leipzig, London and Paris. He became a Professor in Modena. From 1899–1926 he was director of Museo di Storia Naturale in Parma. He was a friend of Anton Dohrn.

Andres was a supporter of Darwinism and gave anniversary lectures supporting his ideas.

== Works ==
- 1884 Le attinie Monografia del Angelo Andres. Volume primo, contente bibliografia, introduzione e specigrafia. Fauna und flora des golfes von Neapel 9. Leipzig, W. Engelmann, 1884. Full text
- 1910 Carlo R. Darwin (nel primo centenario della nascita): lezione fatta all'Università popolare di Parma addì 18 dicembre 1909 dal prof. Angelo Andres.
