= Angelo Ribossi =

Italian painter (1822–1886)

Angelo Ribossi (1822–1886) was an Italian painter.

He was a resident of Milan, where he completes his studies at the Brera Academy, under Giuseppe Sogni and Luigi Sabatelli. His first works were historical and biblical topics, including a Sant'Angelo at the 1847 Exposition. After 1860, he began to paint recent history, such as the News of the Annexation of Naples, reaches Milan in 1861. He also painted dramatic scenes, often from novels, in dress from previous centuries, including Il prete artista and Maternità. Among his works are: Contadina della Valle Sassina and Il momento desiderato (exhibited in 1864 at Milan); Agnese di Besozzo contempla il ritratto del proprio amante Ruggiero di Baggio (exhibited in 1865 at Turin); an oil canvas, depicting Filippo Maria Visconti con Beatrice di Tenda (exhibited in 1870 at Parma); La vigilia del Natale (exhibited in 1872 at Milan); Il cuoco mal pratico, L' Ammaliatrice, and Il vino del padrone (exhibited in 1880 at Turin); Cuoco mal pratico, Passatempo istruttivo, and Momento di buon umore (exhibited in 1881 at Milan); Momento opportuno (exhibited in 1883 at Milan); Il Babau and Prete artista (exhibited in 1886 at Milan). Other works include Scherzo innocente, Scene di famiglia, and Divertimento lecito (exhibited in 1884 at Milan). He displayed paintings at the 1876 Centennial exhibition in Philadelphia. He also painted a scene from Uncle Tom's Cabin depicting Zio Tom con Evangelina.
