= Angelo Bendinelli =

Italian opera singer

Angelo Bendinelli (1876 in Lari, Tuscany – 1942 in Livorno) was an Italian tenor. Possessing a soothing, gentle voice, he debuted at the Teatro San Marco and was a student of Cortesi in Pisa and Giacchetti in Florence.

Later he performed in theaters in many Italian cities, like Bologna, Mantua and Venice, and performed important works such as Rigoletto, La sonnambula, L'amico Fritz, Iris, and Manon.

He regularly sang at the Teatro Petruzzelli of Bari from 1907 to 1925 and also sang abroad in places such as Cairo, Montevideo, and Buenos Aires.

In 1904, he sang at the Teatro G. Donizetti in Bergamo, and the following year he sang at the Palais du Trocadéro in Paris, along with the baritone Titta Ruffo and the soprano Gemma Bellincioni, performing the second act of La Traviata by Giuseppe Verdi.

Bendinelli was noted for his recording work with the Italian Columbia Company, and was one of their earliest tenor stars.
