= Karl Zankl =

Austrian footballer

Karl Zankl (died 3 October 1945) was an Austrian football player. Through his initiative the Austrian Football Association (German: Österreichischer Fußball-Bund, ÖFB) was rebuilt, even though it was during World War II.

== Life ==
Zankl was able celebrate great successes as an active football player. He played for Vienna Cricket and Football-Club, PSV Team Vienna and the Wiener Sport-Club, with which he won in 1922, as a midfielder, the Austrian Championship. Also during the Austrian Cup victory in 1923, Zankl played in the team that defeated the SC Wacker Vienna in the final 3:1.

Karl Zankl, who was police captain as profession, also became known for his commitment to Austria during the Second World War. He was also active in a resistance group and tried to rebuild the Austrian Football Association (ÖFB) before the end of the war.

Zankl also took care of the establishment of an Austria national football team, which he supervised after the war as the first team manager. Zankl was as provisional president of the Vienna Football Association, on whose founding he had played an instrumental part and was also responsible for the organization of the Championship and Cup.

For some time he also coached abroad, Italian side Venezia F.C. and Yugoslav club ND Ilirija Ljubljana. In 1926, trying to reinforce their team, Ilirija brought Karl Zankl to be a player-coach of the team, but his stay was short.
