= Angelo Crema =

Australian rugby league player

Personal information
- Full name: Angelo Fiori Crema
- Born: 30 July 1941 (age 83)

Playing information
- Position: Second-row
Representative
Years	Team	Pld	T	G	FG	P
1963–68	Queensland	11	4	0	0	12
1966	Australia	1	0	0	0	0

Angelo Fiori Crema (born 30 July 1941) is an Australian former rugby league player.

A Tully cane farmer, Crema is one of five siblings born to Italian migrants and began playing rugby league while boarding at Downlands College in Toowoomba. He spent his entire first-grade career with Tully.

Crema, a forward, was a regular Far North Queensland, North Queensland and Queensland representative player during the 1960s. He also made a single Test match appearance for Australia when he was chosen to replace Arthur Beetson in the second-row for their series opener against Great Britain at the Sydney Cricket Ground in 1966.

In 2008, Crema was named in the North Queensland Team of the Century.
