= Angelo Campanella =

Italian painter

Angelo Campanella (born c. 1748 – c. 1815) was an Italian painter and engraver. Born in Rome, he trained under Giovanni Volpato. He engraved the statues of twelve apostles found in the church of St. John Lateran; and some of the plates for Gavin Hamilton's Schola Itálica, including The Presentation in the Temple after Fra Bartolommeo. Other engravings include Christ with the Disciples at Emmaus, The Massacre of the Innocents, and Psyche and Cupid after Raphael.

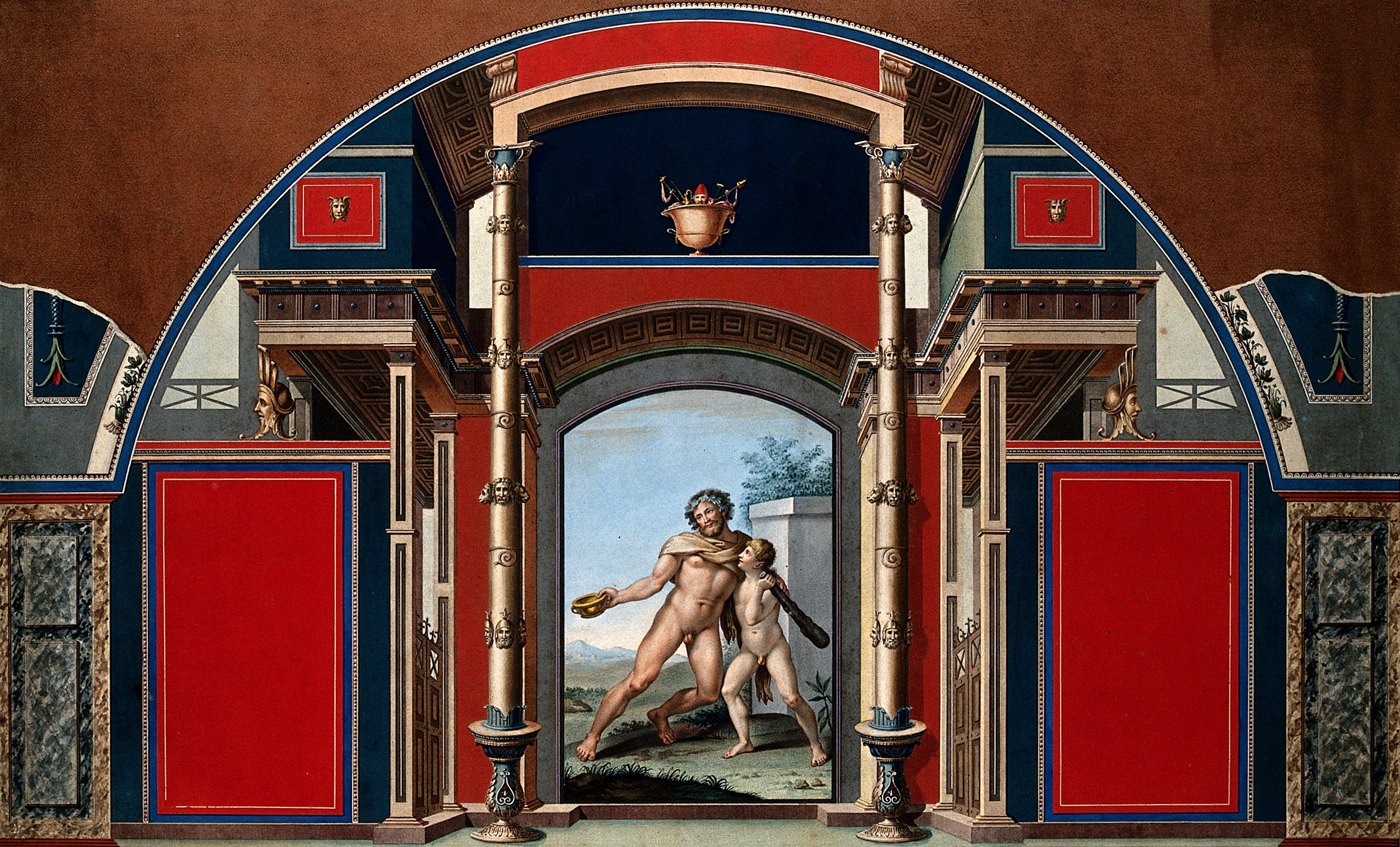
Drunken Hercules

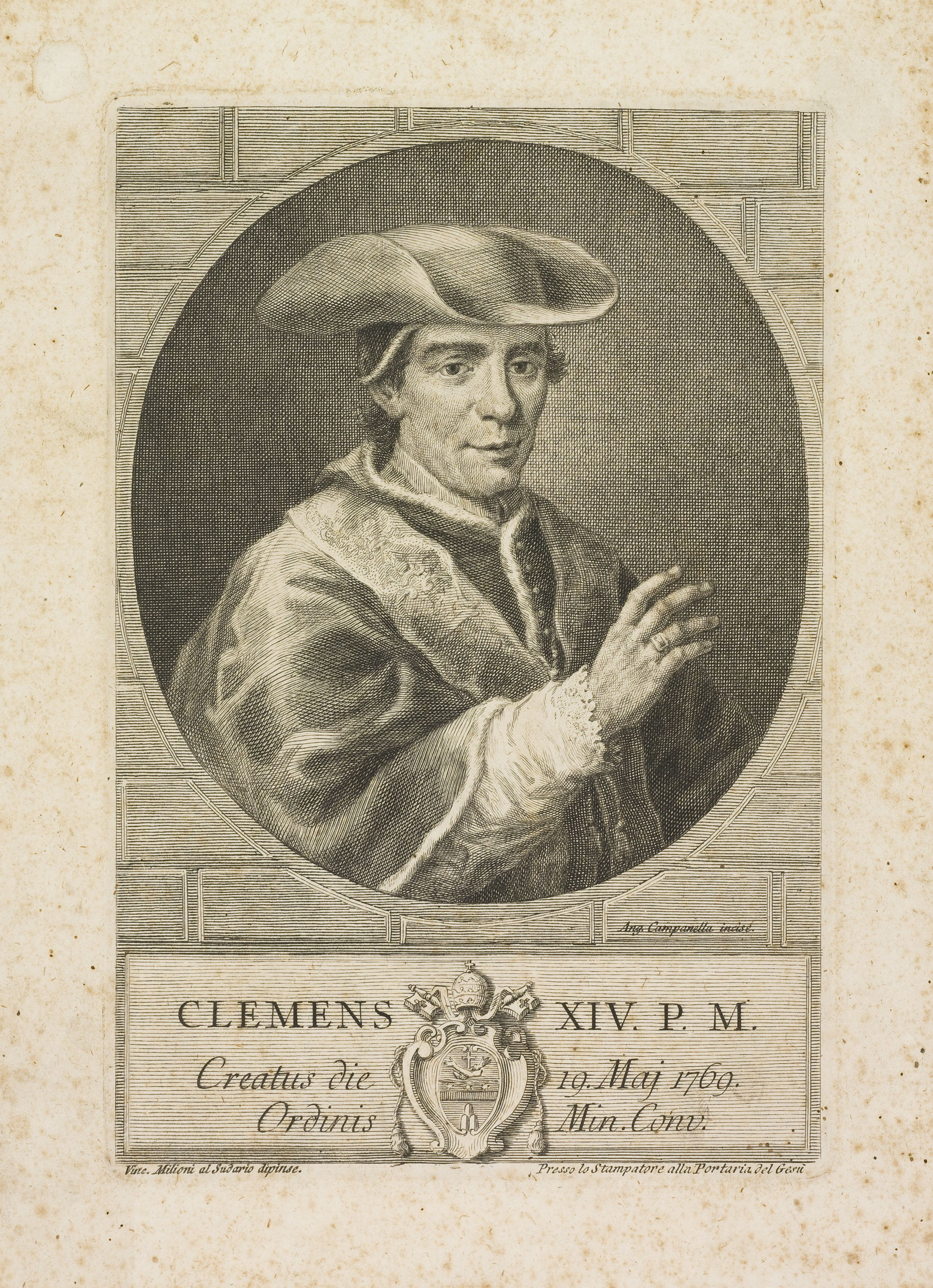
Pope Clemens XIV

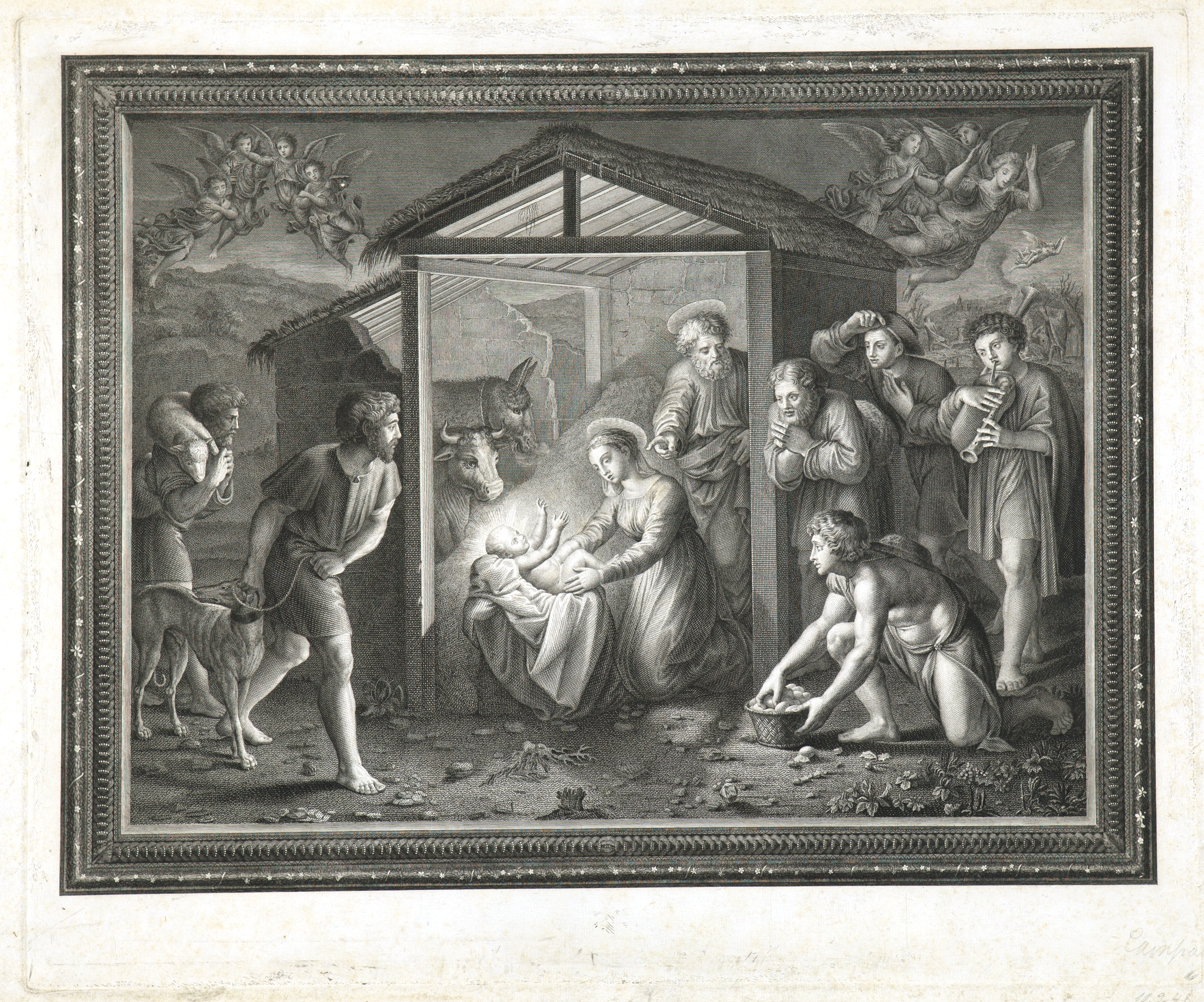
Adoration of the Sheperds

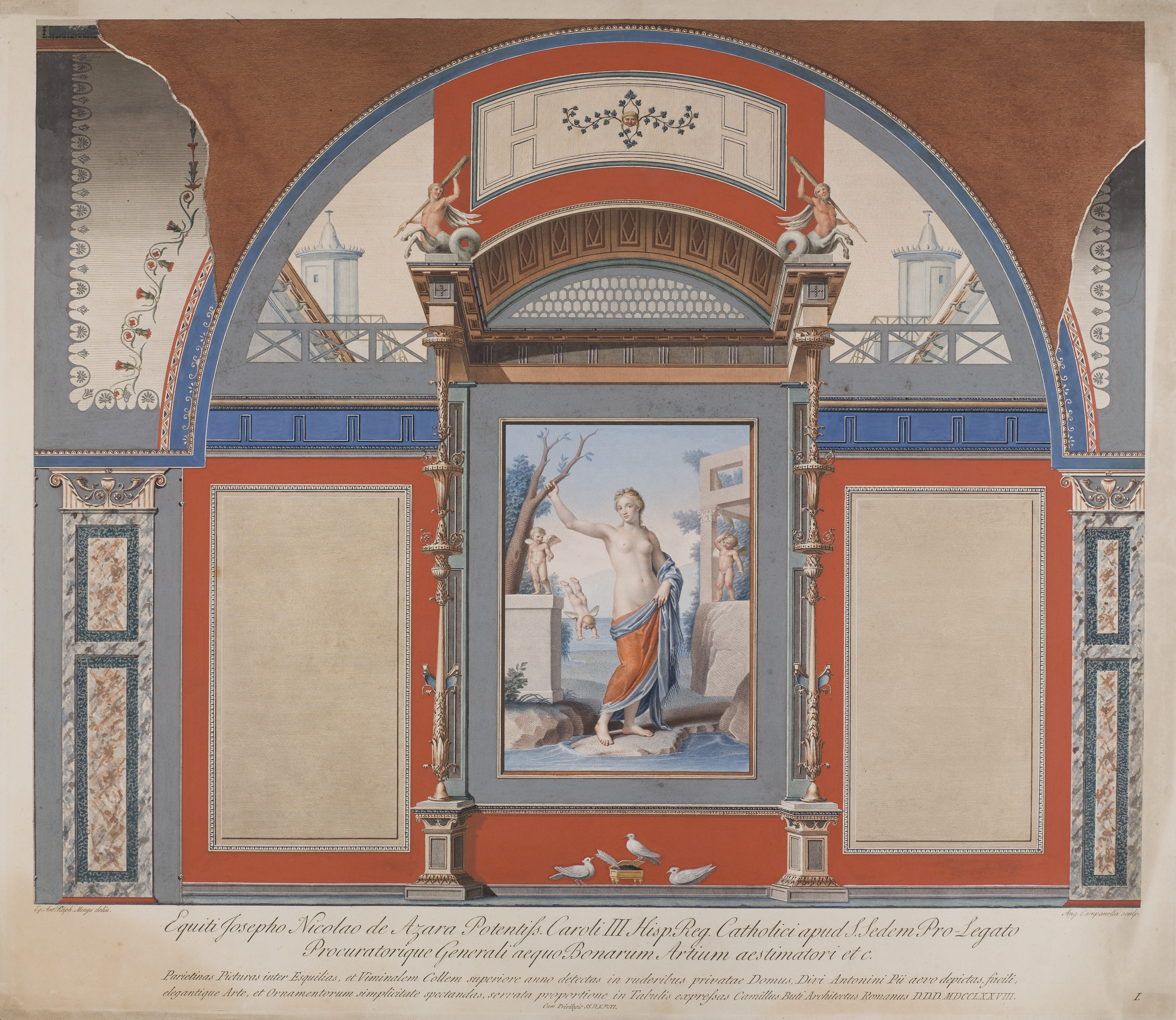
Venus teaching Cupid to fly
