= Angelo Messedaglia =

Italian politician

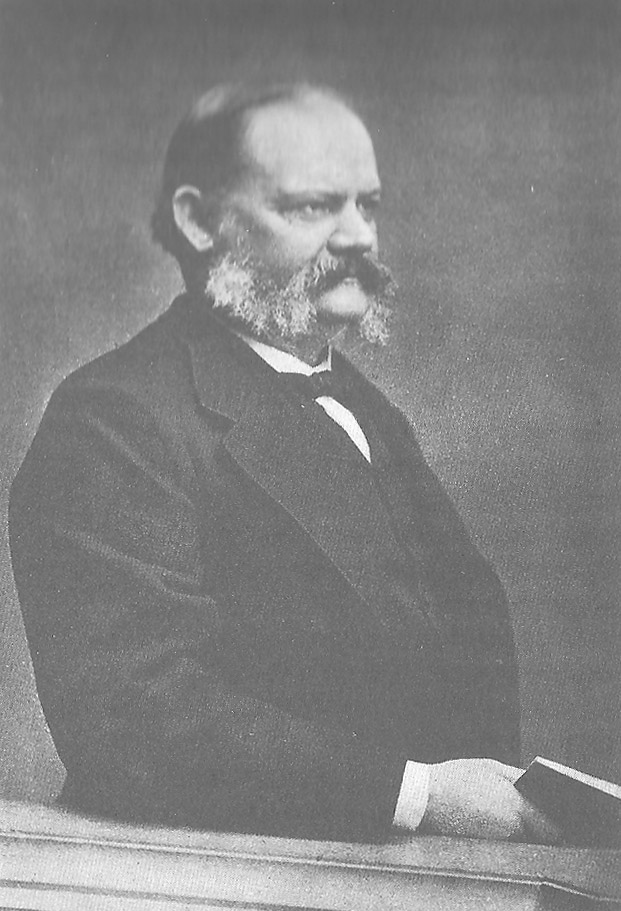
- Born: 2 November 1820; Villafranca, Lombardy–Venetia, Austrian Empire
- Died: 5 April 1901 (aged 80); Rome, Italy
- Education: University of Pavia
- Occupations: Social scientist, statistician, politician, professor

Angelo Messedaglia (2 November 1820 – 5 April 1901) was an Italian social scientist, statistician and politician.

== Biography ==
Born in Villafranca (Verona) on 2 November 1820, he graduated from University of Pavia with a degree in law in 1843. In 1848 he became the provisional government of Milan and was appointed as professor of commercial law the same year. He taught economics and statistics at the universities of Padua and Rome and written many public works on population theory, statistics, analysis, monetary and land. His learning led him to also perform studies on hydraulics and geology and engage both in prose and in poetry. He contributed to several magazines including New Anthology and was a Member of Parliament for Verona from 1866 to 1883 of which he became a senator on 10 May 1884. He died in Rome on 5 April 1901.

== Publications ==
- Statistica morale dell'Inghilterra comparata alla statistica morale della Francia di M.A. Guerry (1865);
- L'imperatore Diocleziano e la legge economica del mercato (1866);
- La statistica e i suoi metodi (1872);
- L'insegnamento politico-amministrativo (1880);
- L'economia politica (1891).
