= Angelo Nannoni =

Italian surgeon and author (1715–1790)

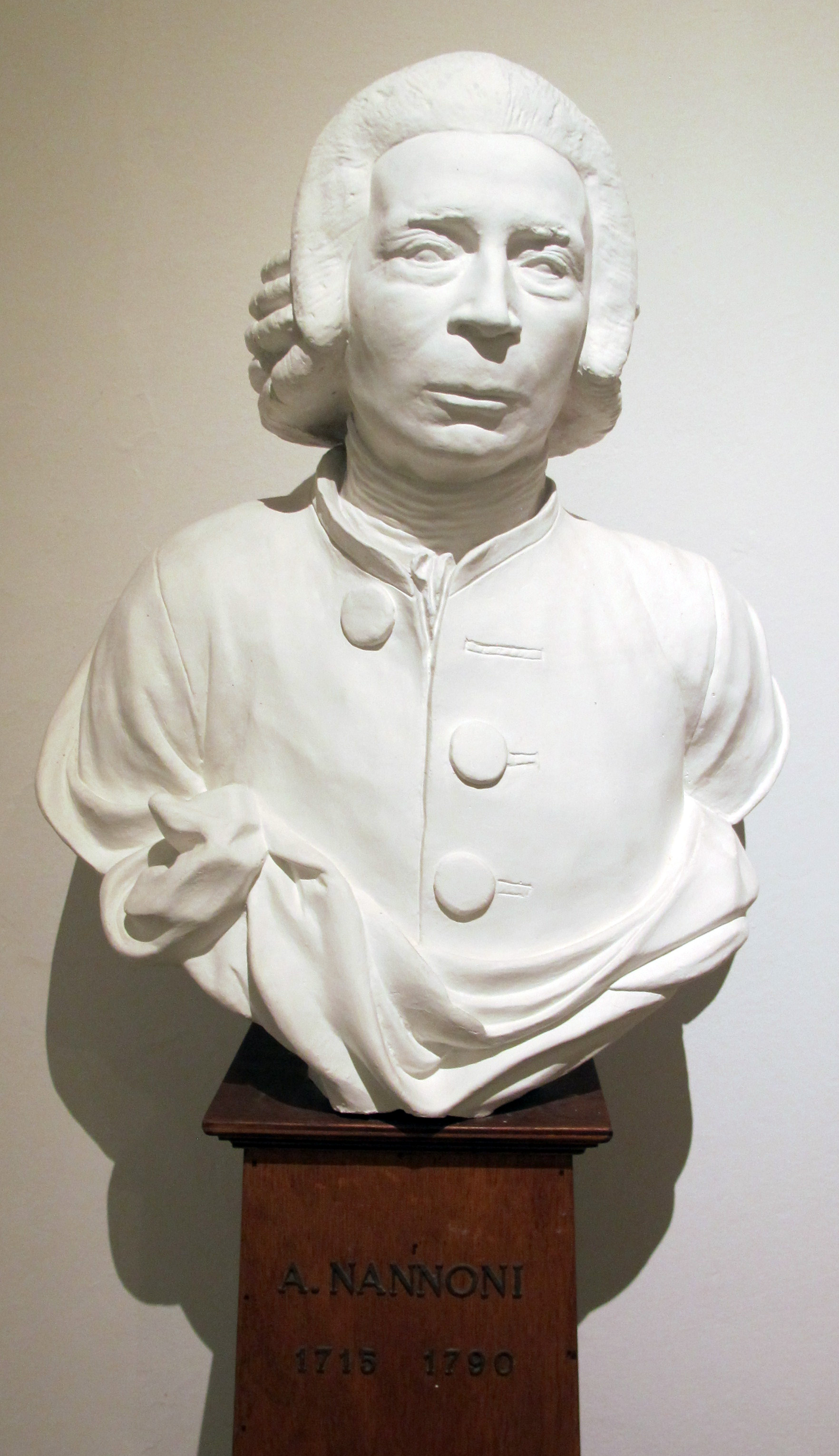
bust of Angelo Nannoni at the museum of the Institute of Anatomic Pathology

Angelo Nannoni (1715 — 30 April 1790) was an Italian surgeon and author of medical treatises.

Angelo was born in Florence, and by age 16 began his studies of anatomy and surgery at the hospital of Santa Maria Novella. In 1747, he visited Paris and Rouen. Returning to Florence, he espoused less complex pharmacologic compounds. He modified the strategy of cataract extraction proposed by Jacques Daviel. His son, Lorenzo Nannoni, was also a prominent surgeon.

== Published works ==
- Trattato sopra i mali delle mammelle Florence, 1746
- Della semplicita del medicare Venice, 1761
- Ricerche critiche sopra lo stato presente della chirurgia by Samuel Sharp, translated from English, Siena, 1774
- Memoria sul l'aneurisma della piegatura del cubito Florence, 1784
- Dissertazione chirurgiche, cioe della fistola lagrimale; delle cataratte, de meciantis ex siccantibus; de medicantis causticis Paris, 1748
