= Angiolo Achini =

Italian painter (1850–1930)

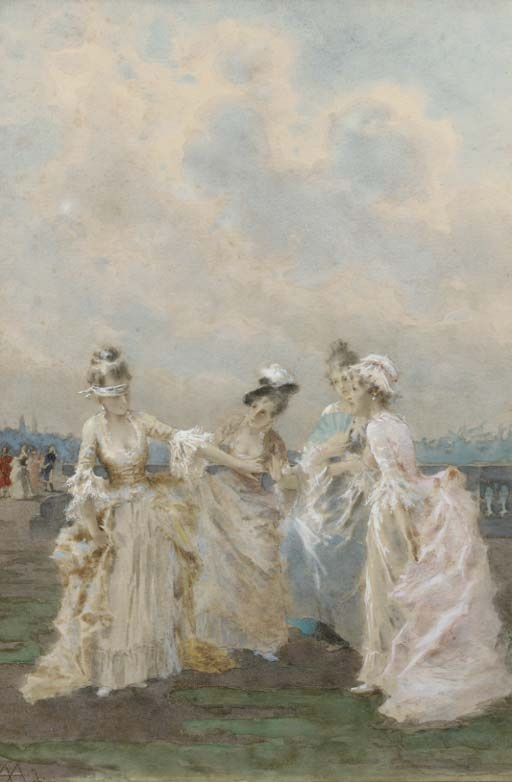
Angiolo Achini, Girls Playing Blind Man's Buff

Angiolo Achini (March 6, 1850 – January 16, 1930) was an Italian painter.

== Biography ==
Angiolo Achini was born in Milan. He was educated at the Brera Academy, where he studied under Giuseppe Bertini. At age 27, he won a national prize for best history painting. In his early 30s, he became a follower of painter Tranquillo Cremona (a leading member of the Scapigliatura). He painted two portraits of Cremona. After completing his studies, he exhibited paintings in Rome and Milan in 1881 and in Turin in 1882. He also exhibited his paintings abroad, e.g. in Munich in 1888. Among his historical canvases were Savonarola arrested and Il colloquio di Clemente VII con Carlo VI ai danni of Firenze (1880, exhibited at Turin). In 1881 at Milan, he exhibited the landscape Una nevicata. In 1883 at Milan: Baptism; Lo scalo merci; two portraits; una Messalina, and La ripa di porta Ticinese. In 1883 in Rome he exhibited Interno di San Marco; Attenzione; Circus Romanus; Tranquillo Cremona sul suo letto di morte; Ottobre; and Tramonto. In 1886 at Milan, he exhibited the watercolors Monaca and Marina, and oil canvases Vedova; Lo scarico delle merci; and Amor Materno.

He died in Milan on January 16, 1930.

== Works ==
Achini's works include:

- Interno di San Marco (Interior of San Marco)
- Tranquillo Cremona sul letto di morte (Tranquillo Cremona on his deathbed)
- Amor Materno (Maternal love)
- Circus Romanus
- Nevicata (Snowfall)
- Ritratto di Francesco Tamburini (Portrait of Francesco Tamburini)
- L'arresto di Fra' Gerolamo Savonarola (The Arrest of Fra' Gerolamo Savonarola)
- A mosca cieca (At blind man's buff)
- Mascherina (Mask)
- Donna in costume turco (Lady in Turkish dress)
