= Angelo Garzio =

Italian-American potter

Angelo Charles Garzio (1922–2008) was an Italian-American educator, ceramic artist and musician. He received four Fulbright Senior Lectureships during the course of his career and was Professor emeritus at Kansas State University at the time of his death. At the age of 70, Garzio acted as a U.S. State Department Cultural Arts Visiting Ceramic Lecturer to Santa Cruz and Sucre, Bolivia. His ceramic work is included in collections of the Museum of Arts and Design in New York City and the Smithsonian American Art Museum in Washington, D.C.

Garzio's ceramic work was exhibited in over fifty national and international exhibitions during his lifetime. He was a member of the Mid-West Designer Craftsmen, the Kansas Designer/Craftsmen Association and the Phi Mu Alpha Music Honorary. He produced essays for arts and crafts publications, including American Craft, Bolletino del Museo Internozionale della Ceramiche de Faenza, Cerámica, Ceramics Monthly, Korea Journal, and New Zealand Potter. Garzio was also a book reviewer for Choice: Current Reviews for Academic Libraries.

== Education and training ==
Garzio was born July 22, 1922 in the Italian village of Mirabello Sannitico. He and his family emigrated to the United States when he was a child. Garzio became a U.S. citizen in 1956. He received his early education in Syracuse, New York and served in the U. S. Army Air Corps during World War II. Under the G.I. Bill, Garzio attended Syracuse University, earning dual bachelor's degrees in Library Science and Music, Art and Literature in 1949. He worked briefly as a reference librarian and played the French horn professionally with symphony orchestras in Syracuse, Utica and Rochester, New York and Bridgeport, Connecticut.

In 1950, Garzio earned a Diploma de Proffito in Art History at the University of Florence. He received an M.A. in art history at the University of Iowa in 1954 and an M.F. A. in Ceramics in 1955. He was a Guest Potter at the internationally known Arabia Potteries in Helsinki, Finland in 1956–57.

Garzio joined the faculty at Kansas State University as an assistant professor of ceramics in 1957, and was promoted to full professor in 1966. In 1972, Garzio received the institution's Distinguished Graduate Faculty Award. He taught at the university until shortly before his death on January 20, 2008.
