= Angelo Faticoni =

American artist

Angelo Faticoni (1859 – August 2, 1931) was a professional freakshow artist and contortionist who was renowned for his unusual buoyancy. He was known as the 'Human Cork'.

Faticoni was an Italian-American who discovered during his early childhood that he was able to float for long periods of time, although he did not use his abilities professionally until later life. Faticoni's professional feats include being sewn into a sack and thrown into a river attached to a 20-pound cannonball. A journalist at the time reported that Faticoni soon poked his head out of the sack and "he remained motionless in that position for hours".

On another occasion, the artist swam across the Hudson River tied to a chair which was weighted with lead. Doctors at Harvard University tested Faticoni's abilities by observing him in a pool of water with a 20-pound lead weight tied to him. Faticoni stayed afloat for 15 hours. Doctors concluded that Faticoni's abilities were due to abnormal internal organs.

Though contemporary scientists were unable to find illusionism in Faticoni's work, the media frequently suggested that his unusually abilities were due to other-worldly forces. Popular psychics of the time suggested that spirits assisted him with staying afloat. Although the 'Human Cork' promised to reveal the secret of his buoyancy, he died before he was able to, dying on August 2, 1931, at St. Vincent's Hospital whilst visiting relatives in Jacksonville, Florida. Faticoni's obituary in The New York Times carried the headline; "Human Cork dies, secret untold".
