= Angelo Pietra =

Italian economist

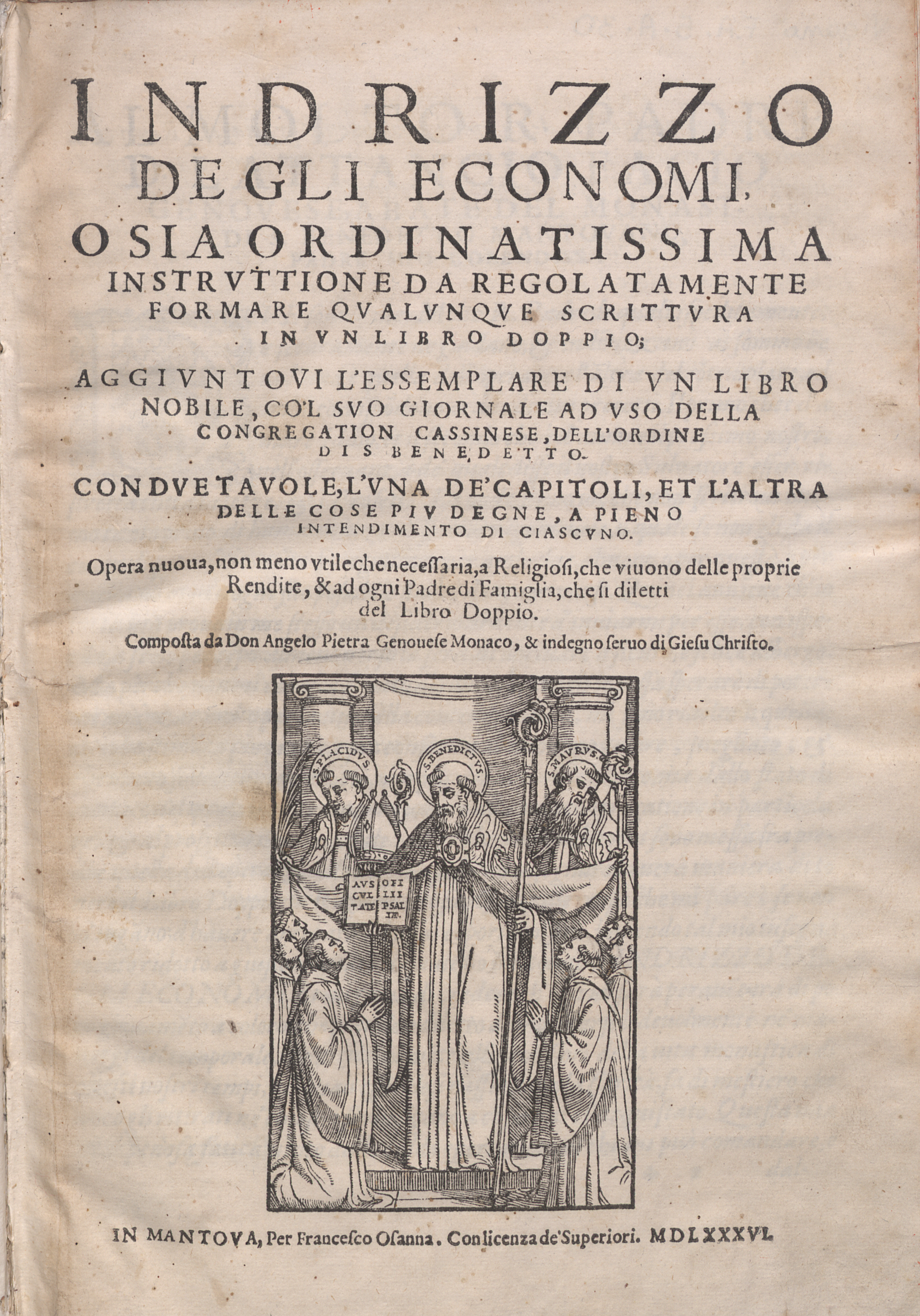
Indrizzo degli economi, 1586

Angelo Pietra (1550–1590) was an Italian Benedictine economist. He was a pioneer in accountancy and in particular the concept of financial accounting. He was born in Moneglia, and died in Montecassino.

== Works ==
- Indrizzo degli economi. In Mantoua: Francesco Osanna. 1586.
