= Angelo Canevari =

Italian painter

- Born: 7 June 1901; Viterbo, Italy
- Died: 1955 (aged 53–54); Viterbo, Italy
- Occupation: Painter

Angelo Canevari (7 June 1901 – 1955) was an Italian painter. His work was part of the painting event in the art competition at the 1936 Summer Olympics.
