= Angelo Compagnoni =

Italian politician (1921–2018)

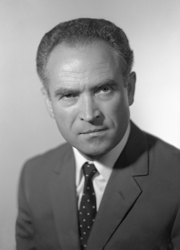
Angelo Compagnoni

Angelo Compagnoni (25 September 1921 – 25 June 2018) was an Italian politician who served as a Deputy from 1953 to 1963 and Senator from 1963 to 1972.
