= Angelo Bongioanni =

Italian librarian and onomastician (1864–1931)

Angelo Bongioanni (4 April 1864 – 28 November 1931) was an Italian librarian, literary scholar, and onomastician. Born in Mondovì, he earned a degree in literature at the University of Turin in 1886. Bongioanni died in Susa, Piedmont in 1931. He is known for authoring Nomi e cognomi (1928), the first comprehensive dictionary of Italian names. He was the father of Emilio Bongioanni, a soldier who died in World War I and was awarded the Gold Medal of Military Valor.
