= Angelo Pereni =

Italian footballer and coach (died 2020)

Personal information
- Date of death: 11 September 2020
- Position: Midfielder

Youth career
- Legnano

Senior career*
Years	Team	Apps	(Gls)
- Legnano
- Novara
- Catania
- Palermo
- Pro Vercelli

Managerial career
- 1997–1998: Lecce
- Albania (assistant)
- * Club domestic league appearances and goals

Angelo Pereni (died 11 September 2020) was an Italian football player and coach.

== Career ==
Pereni played as a midfielder for Legnano, Novara, Catania, Palermo and Pro Vercelli.

He later became a coach, and was assistant manager of the Albania national team under Gianni De Biasi.
