= Angelo Pascal =

Italian painter (1858–1888)

Angelo Pascal (Turin, August, 1858 – July 18, 1888) was an Italian painter.

== Biography ==
His father was a tailor, and was initially trained as an engineer. He then drifted to studying art at the Accademia Albertina under Andrea Gastaldi. He was eclectic in subjects. In 1883 at Milan, he displayed Bonjour de Mimi and Lettrici a Roma; in 1883, Il giuoco degli sposi; in 1884 at Turin, two female portraits and Dopo il voltzer. In 1881 at Venice, he exhibited a half figure of a woman.
