= Angelo Dayu Agor =

South Sudanese politician

Angelo Dayu Agor was a South Sudanese politician. He was the Economic Advisor for the state of Central Equatoria. He died on 27 February 2019. He was married to Monica Michael.
