= Angelo Avramakis =

Greek musician and bouzouki player

Angelo Avramakis (Greek: Βαγγέλης Αβραμάκης) is a Greek musician and bouzouki virtuoso. Born in Serres, Greece, and raised in Australia, he has become one of the most prominent bouzouki players in the world, known for his technical skill and expressive style.

Angelo began playing drums at the age of 4 and picked up the bouzouki at 8. He later studied music theory and harmony at the Melba Conservatorium of Music in Melbourne. In addition to the bouzouki, he plays guitar, keyboards, bass guitar, and baglama.

Over the years, he has toured and performed with many of Greece’s most celebrated artists, including Vaso Hatzi, Vasilis Saleas, Tasos Bougas, Lakis Alexandrou, Stamatis Gonidis, Zafeiris Melas, Rita Sakellariou, Doukissa, Tzeni Vanou, Stamatis Kokotas, Antzela Dimitriou, Lefteris Pantazis, Efi Thodi, Makis Kalaitzis, Yiannis Katevas, John Tikis, Giannis Vasileiou and Marinella. He has also performed with the very popular and talented Turkish singer Ibrahim Tatlises when he appeared in Melbourne as a guest at "Nikos Greek Tavern" in the 1990s.

Over the last three decades, Angelo has appeared in Greek newspapers as well as TV shows such as “Tonight Live with Steve Vizard”. Some of his original recordings have been broadcast on radio stations 3XY and FOX FM. His performances and recordings have also been shared on online platforms including YouTube. He has also appeared on Greek TV ANT1 and ERT World.

He has released several albums, including "Terma Oi Thisies" (2000) and "New Wave Passion" (2007).

His playing style draws influence from Manolis Hiotis (Greek: Μανώλης Χιώτης) and Giorgos Zambetas (Greek: Γιώργος Ζαμπέτας), blending traditional rebetiko and laiko foundations with contemporary expression and clarity of tone.

== Songs ==
Below are some of the songs written, co-written, arranged or produced by Angelo Avramakis. In brackets are the year of CD release, the composer and the lyricist:

- Kokkina na mi foreseis (2000, Spiros Manissalis, Angelo Avramakis, Anestis Chiaplias)
- Aisthima krifo (2000, Angelo Avramakis, Dimitris Kavvadas)
- Peismatakia (2000, Anestis Chiaplias)
- Latin 2000 - solo (2000, Angelo Avramakis)
- Terma oi thisies (2000, Spiros Manissalis, Stavros Kopsaftis)
- Rock Tsifteteli - solo (2000, Angelo Avramakis)
- Spourgitaki (2000, Anestis Chiaplias, Angelo Avramakis, Stavros Kopsaftis)
- Pes mou (2000, Anestis Chiaplias)
- Diazigio (2000, Anestis Chiaplias)
- Mikra Asia - solo (2000, Angelo Avramakis)
- Ta prota vimata (2002, Kostas Kartsakis)
- Agapis paramithia (2002, Kostas Kartsakis, Angelo Avramakis)
- Diko mou to parapono (2002, Kostas Kartsakis)
- Den apokleiete (2002, Kostas Kartsakis)
- Oloi oi filoi (2002, Kostas Kartsakis, Angelo Avramakis)
- Den to perimena (2002, Kostas Kartsakis)
- Mi me rotiseis (2002, Kostas Kartsakis)
- Den se thelo (2002, Kostas Kartsakis)
- New Wave Passion (2007, Angelo Avramakis)
- Arabim (2007, traditional)
- Mystique (2007, Angelo Avramakis)
- Fesupanallah (2007, Erkin Koray)
- Sunshine Walk (2007, Angelo Avramakis)
- Misket (2007, traditional)
- Oasis (2007, Chris Nicolaidis)
- Latin 2000 - remix (2007, Angelo Avramakis)
- Rock Tsifteteli - remix (2007, Angelo Avramakis)
- Konya Dance Mix (2007, traditional)
- Mikra Asia - remix (2007, Angelo Avramakis)
- Western Tik (2007, traditional)
- Eastern Kotsari (2007, traditional)
- Padisah (2007, Serdar Ortaç)
