= Angelo Dos Santos =

Brazilian musician (born 1940)

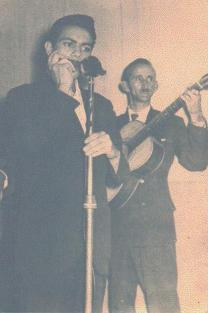
- Dos Santos playing at the Carioca NightClub (1960)
- Born: Angelo Dos Santos; September 8, 1940 (age 86); Águeda, Portugal
- Years active: 1958- 1972
- Spouse: Jandyra Regis Dos Santos (1962-present)

Angelo Dos Santos (born September 8, 1940) is a Brazilian harmonica player.

== Biography ==
At the age of 11, Dos Santos, while under his uncle's custody, Julio Dos Santos, moved to Rio de Janeiro, Brazil. When he was a teenager, Rio de Janeiro experienced the period when Bossa Nova, western swing, and some forms of American Big Band music were combining to give birth to classical orchestral harmonica music. The period featured bands such as Borrah Minnevitch and his Harmonica Rascals, and The Harmonicats. Dos Santos taught himself the harmonica and began playing professionally at 19 years old. He would eventually specialize in the Chord harmonica, becoming a classical harmonica player, and the co-founder of the Harmonikings. His instrument of choice was the Hohner 267/384 CHORD HARMONICA, which featured 192 holes.

The Harmonikings were a Brazilian harmonica-based trio, which consisted of Angelo Dos Santos (bass harmonica), Ulysses Cazallas (chromatic lead harmonica), and Dario Pacheco (chromatic). The trio was formed in 1962 and remained active until 1972 when Dos Santos moved to the United States. With a vast repertoire of classical and popular songs, the Harmonikings performed on several top rated Brazilian Television and radio shows of the era. The trio also headlined at various social clubs and night clubs located in Rio de Janeiro and São Paulo. They recorded a 12-song LP called "No Embalo". Ulysses Cazallas continued playing with the São Paulo based Curitiba Harmonica Orquestra until his death in 2006. Dos Santos remained a contributor to the group throughout its existence, working on arrangements and occasionally recording. He is currently a member of the Garden State Harmonica Club, in Paramus, New Jersey. Dos Santos resides in Newark, New Jersey, with wife Jandyra Dos Santos, and has a son, daughter-in-law, and two grandchildren.

== Discography ==
- 1967 The Harmonikings "No Embalo"
- 1998 The Harmonikings " The Lost Studio Sessions".

== Television appearances ==
- 1966 The Moacir Franco Show
- 1967 TV Tupi
- 1967 Programa Do Castrinho
- 1968 TV Excelsior
