= Angelo Vassallo (water polo) =

Italian water polo player

Personal information
- Nationality: Italian

Sport
- Sport: Water polo

Angelo Vassallo was an Italian water polo player. He competed in the men's tournament at the 1920 Summer Olympics.
