= Angelo Ibarra =

Argentine footballer

Personal information
- Full name: Angelo Javier Ibarra
- Date of birth: 20 April 1999 (age 27)
- Place of birth: Corrientes, Argentina
- Position: Forward

Youth career
- Los Andes

Senior career*
Years	Team	Apps	(Gls)
2018–2019	Los Andes	3	(0)
- * Club domestic league appearances and goals

Angelo Javier Ibarra (born 20 April 1999) is an Argentine professional footballer who plays as a forward.

== Career ==
Ibarra made the move into senior football with Los Andes in 2018–19. He was substituted on in Primera B Nacional fixtures with Guillermo Brown and Olimpo by manager Aníbal Biggeri in October 2018, who then selected the forward to start an eventual 0–2 defeat to Atlético de Rafaela in November. Ibarra left in 2019.

== Career statistics ==
As of 1 July 2020.

Appearances and goals by club, season and competition
Club	Season	League			Cup		Continental		Other		Total	
Club	Season	Division	Apps	Goals	Apps	Goals	Apps	Goals	Apps	Goals	Apps	Goals
Los Andes	2018–19	Primera B Nacional	3	0	0	0	—		0	0	3	0
Career total			3	0	0	0	—		0	0	3	0
