= Angelo Mayer =

German footballer (born 1996)

Personal information
- Date of birth: 10 September 1996 (age 30)
- Place of birth: Schrobenhausen, Germany
- Height: 1.69 m (5 ft 7 in)
- Position: Left-back

Team information
- Current team: FC Pipinsried
- Number: 39

Youth career
- –2008: FSV Pfaffenhofen
- 2008–2015: 1860 Munich

Senior career*
Years	Team	Apps	(Gls)
2014–2017	1860 Munich II	38	(0)
2017–2021	Bayern Munich II	24	(0)
2022–2024	TSV Rain am Lech	49	(3)
2023–	FC Pipinsried	73	(0)

International career^{‡}
2012	Germany U16	1	(0)
2012	Germany U17	1	(0)
2013	Germany U18	2	(0)
2014	Germany U19	2	(0)
- * Club domestic league appearances and goals as of 10:12, 7 October 2025 (UTC) ‡ National team caps and goals as of 20 July 2019

Angelo Mayer (born 10 September 1996) is a German footballer who plays as a left-back for Bayernliga club FC Pipinsried.

== Career ==
Mayer made his professional debut for Bayern Munich II in the 3. Liga on 20 July 2019, starting in the away match against Würzburger Kickers.
