= Angelo Jannone =

Italian military commandant

- Born: 1962 (age 63–64); Andria, Apulia, Italy
- Education: Nunziatella Military School, Military Academy of Modena
- Military career
- Allegiance: Italian Armed Forces
- Branch: Carabinieri Company, Corleone Raggruppamento Operativo Speciale
- Service years: 1983 – 2003
- Rank: Lieutenant colonel

Angelo Jannone is a former Italian colonel and commandant at carabinieri's corp, business consultant, manager, professor of criminology and writer. He is best known as one of the first infiltrators within the mafia and narcos families and as close collaborator of the judge Giovanni Falcone. He acted undercover in Colombian drug traffickers organizations linked to Camorristi and 'ndrine. His infiltration allowed seizure of 280 kilos cocaine and the arrest of over 40 people between Naples, Milan, Rome, Amsterdam and Venezuela. After his military career he subsequently joined the Telecom Italia Group as a manager. There, he fell under investigation for illegal counter-intelligence activities in the 2004 Telecom trial. He was accused by one of the people already under investigation, this accuser was subsequently convicted. During the trial he resigned from his position as manager in order to defend himself in the trial in which he was subsequently acquitted.

== Career ==
He attended the Nunziatella Military School and the Military Academy of Modena.

=== Service in the Carabinieri ===
Angelo Jannone was the commander of the Carabinieri's company in Corleone from 1989 to 1991 and author, with Giovanni Falcone, of the investigations on the patrimony of Totò Riina and on the accountant Pino Mandalari. From Corleone he was transferred for security reasons, since he entered the aims of the Corleonesi mafia group after having started the investigations for the arrest of the boss Salvatore Rina with a surveillance plan on the houses of the Bagarella. The indications given to Sergio De Caprio, better known as Captain Ultimo, gave impulse to the arrest of the Chief of the Chiefs. After Corleone, in Catania, he commanded the Investigative Unit and was at the center of a bloody shooting 18 June 1992, where he captured an entire group of fire of the Cursoti clan. After Catania, in Calabria, he commanded the company of Roccella Ionica, and was the protagonist of several important operations against the mafia families of Locride and the Piromalli. Also, in Calabria, he signed the report about Galassia case, which led to the arrest of 187 members of Cosa Nostra and many mafia families of Calabria and their branches in Europe and other Italian Regions. From Calabria he was transferred after a criminal had revealed a plan to attack him since he was wanted by the Ndrine della Locride. Later he commanded for three years the Investigation Departement in Venice, where he was in the limelight for investigations against corruption. He was then transferred to the Special Team in Rome, better known as ROS, in the summer of 2000 and left the Corp in December 2003, with the rank of lieutenant colonel.

During the period this occurred he had been under cover for two years infiltrating a Colombian narco-trafficking organization linked to Italian Mafia, allowing the seizure and destruction of 280 kilograms of cocaine and the arrest of more than 43 people in Naples, Milan, Rome, Amsterdam, and Venezuela. The story is told by the book by Giorgio Sturlese Tosi "Una vita da Infiltrato" and Rizzoli, 2010. At ROS, as commander of Analysis Department was also in charge, to draft the first report on the Economy, Crime and Finance in Italy, with the chapter "Indicators of infiltration in the sector of public contracts", written together with the National Anti-Mafia Prosecutor, Franco Roberti. Over the years he spent in the Corp, he has received numerous awards for his service merits.

=== Private sector ===
Since 2004, he has been with Telecom Italia and has held a number of management positions, including Telecom Security Manager for Latin America. He resigned from Telecom in March 2007 following the Telecom scandal. He is currently Director of Internal Audit & Compliance at Italiaonline and coordinator of the Scientific Committee of Feder privacy after having been CEO of a consulting firm in the field of corporate Audit & Compliance and partner of an international law firm. He teaches at La Sapienza University in Rome and has collaborated with the Eurispes Crime Observatory.

He is also author of some publications on Guida al Diritto (Il Sole 24 Ore) and Rivista 231, in 2003 he co-authored Crimes and Money, ed. Igea (co-authored by Donanto Masciandaro and others), in November 2010 he published "Intelligence, un metodo per la ricerca della verità" ed. Eurilink, with the preface of Roberto Pennisi, Deputy National Anti-Mafia Prosecutor, in 2015 published "Corruption of Social Fraud and Corporate Fraud" ed. Franco Angeli and in 2017 with Ivano Maccani, General of the Guardia di Finanza and with the preface of the National Anti-Mafia Prosecutor Franco Roberti, published, again for Franco Angeli, "Corruption and Anti-Corruption in Italy".

In 2012, he published Eroi Silenziosi, an autobiographical book, with a preface by General Luigi Federici, former Commander General of the Carabinieri.

In 2015 he was awarded the Premio Livatino-Saetta 2015 in Catania for the fight against the Mafia, dedicated to Judges Rosario Livatino and Giuseppe Saetta, killed by Cosa Nostra

In 2016 he became Internal Auditor of Italia online and Vice President of Select Milano, a committee set up to support the City of Milan in welcoming any capital leaving the City of London after Brexit, which he left due to differences of opinion with its President.
