= Angelo Keder =

Swedish contemporary artist

Angelo Keder (born 1955), is a Swedish contemporary artist. Keder worked as a transcriber at the National Museum of Art in Stockholm (nationalmuseum), Sweden. He made his artistic debut in 1973 at Dickens Gallery, Lausanne, Switzerland and has since exhibited at a variety of commercial art galleries and art fairs worldwide, but he got his breakthrough in Sweden during the early part of the 1980s exhibiting at various spaces and locations. Among places he has exhibited in Sweden are the Stockholm Art Fair Sollentuna and “Lilla Bleu” gallery in Stockholm, Sweden. There he exhibited with artists such as Olle Bonniér and Peter Dahl.
