= Tommy Angelo =

American poker player (born 1958)

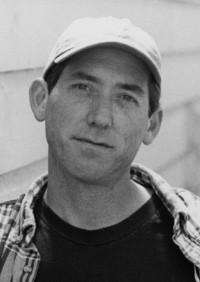
- Tommy Angelo
- Born: August 25, 1958 (age 68); Columbus, Ohio

Tommy Angelo (born August 25, 1958) is an Oakland, California professional poker player, writer, and coach. Angelo was a career musician in the 1980s, performing rock and country on drums and piano. In 1990, he became a full-time professional poker player. Since then has since written 150 magazine articles, written and produced 60 poker-training videos, and written and published four books on poker, and one book on meditation.

== Writer ==
Angelo has written and self-published five books. Four of them are about poker. The fifth is about meditation.

On December 13, 2007, Tommy released his first book, Elements of Poker.

On May 1, 2011, Tommy released his second book, A Rubber Band Story and Other Poker Tales.

On March 14, 2017, Tommy released his third book, Painless Poker.

On October 23, 2018, Tommy released his fourth book, Waiting for Straighters

On February 11, 2019, Tommy released his fifth book, Dailyness: How to Sustain a Meditation Practice.

Angelo has written articles for Poker Digest Magazine, PokerPages.com, Bluff Magazine, and PokerNews.com magazine. And more recently, Angelo wrote articles for PokerCoaching.com and Poker.org.

== Movies ==
Angelo was featured in the 2019 documentary film by Michael Bailey called For Love or Money: A Poker Documentary.

In 2019, Angelo partnered with Lee Jones to make YouTube videos for poker players. The series is called PokerSimple.

In 2020, Angelo launched the PokerWords video series at the Tommy Angelo YouTube channel.

== Poker coach ==
Since 2003, Angelo has offered one-on-on poker coaching called The T i l t l e s s Program. He has coached many top-flight poker players, including Jay Rosenkrantz, Phil Galfond, and David Benefield. In 2018, Angelo converted his coaching model to video calls.

With Wayne Lively and Rob Cole, Angelo produced an eight-episode poker-coaching video series titled The Eightfold Path to Poker Enlightenment (EPTPE) that focuses on the role of psychology for professional poker players. The title of the series derives from one of the principal teachings of the Buddha, the Noble Eightfold Path. EPTPE was released during the summer of 2009 at DeucesCracked.

In 2015, Angelo made ten videos for the poker training site, Run It Once. His videos focus on mental game topics for professional poker players.

In 2018, Angelo began offering affordable coaching to low-stakes poker players, on poker strategy and on all aspects of the poker life, using zoom video calls. Details are at tommyangelo.com.

In 2020, Angelo became a content creator at Jonathan Little’s site: https://pokercoaching.com

== Musician ==
Tommy plays drums, piano, guitar, and bass, harmonica, and banjo. He has been performing and producing music since he was 8. He played with the band called Just Another Band. In 1980, Tommy self-released the LP A Work of Aardvark under the name "Tom Angelo". In 2001, he released a six track CD album of poker-related songs entitled I'm Running Bad.

== Podcast appearances ==
Angelo has appeared as a guest on these podcasts: TwoPlusTwo Pokercast, DeucePlays podcast with Bart Hanson of DeucesCracked, Pokercast.com, HouseofCardsRadio.com, ruKusradio.com, and Badugi All-Stars, ThinkingPoker.net, RedChipPoker.com, Poker Live Podcast with Joey Ingram, KristyArnett.com, TexasHoldemRadio.com, PokerMindCoach.com with Elliot Roe, HighRollerRadio.net, and PokerNews.com.
