= Angelo Abenante =

Italian trade unionist and politician (1927–2024)

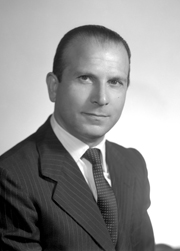
- Abenante in 1972

Member of the Senate of the Republic
- In office 5 June 1968 – 4 July 1976
- Constituency: Campania

Member of the Chamber of Deputies
- In office 16 May 1963 – 4 June 1968
- Constituency: Naples

Personal details
- Born: 10 May 1927 Torre Annunziata, Italy
- Died: 27 March 2024 (aged 96) Torre Annunziata, Italy
- Party: PCI
- Occupation: Trade unionist

Angelo Abenante (10 May 1927 – 27 March 2024) was an Italian trade unionist and politician. A member of the Italian Communist Party, he served in the Chamber of Deputies from 1963 to 1968 and in the Senate of the Republic from 1968 to 1976.

== Career ==
After graduating from the Liceo scientifico Vincenzo Cuoco in Naples, he studied Engineering at the University of Naples Federico II, without completing his studies.

A trade unionist of the Italian General Confederation of Labour (CGIL), from 1956 onwards, he was a member of the secretariat of the Chamber of Labour of Naples. A member of the Italian Communist Party, he was a municipal councillor and assessor for urban planning in Torre Annunziata and a provincial councillor in Naples.

Abenante was then elected to the Chamber of Deputies in Legislature IV of Italy (from 1963 to 1968), while in Legislatures V and VI he was a senator, remaining in office from 1968 until 1976.

== Personal life and death ==
Abenante was married to Ada Salvagnini, a Venetian onetime World War II partisan born in Mestre in 1923; she died in 2011.

Abenante died on 27 March 2024, at the age of 96.
