= Angelo Mariani =

Angelo Mariani may refer to:

- Angelo Mariani (conductor) (1821–1873), Italian conductor
- Angelo Mariani (chemist) (1838–1914), French chemist
