= Angelo Cesi =

Angelo Cesi may refer to:

- Angelo Cesi (bishop of Rimini) (1592–1646), Italian Roman Catholic bishop
- Angelo Cesi (bishop of Todi) (1530–1606), Italian Roman Catholic bishop
