= Angelo Haligiannis =

Angelo Haligiannis managed the hedge fund Sterling Watters as a Ponzi scheme and pleaded guilty in 2005 of defrauding investors of tens of millions of dollars. He fled an expected 15-year jail term the day before his scheduled sentencing on January 11, 2006.

He was recaptured on the island of Crete in August, 2007, conditionally released by Greek authorities, and then arrested again in September of that year.
