= Angelo Marciani =

Italian water polo player (1928–2022)

Personal information
- Born: 19 April 1928; Camogli, Italy
- Died: 3 December 2022 (aged 94); Camogli, Italy

Sport
- Sport: Water polo

Angelo Marciani (19 April 1928 – 3 December 2022) was an Italian water polo player who competed in the 1956 Summer Olympics. In 1956 he was a member of the Italian team which finished fourth in the Olympic tournament.
