= Angelo Lutz =

Professional chef and former mobster

- Born: South Philadelphia
- Occupation: Chef

Angelo Jenaro Lutz, sometimes referred to by the nickname "Fat Ange", is a professional chef. He has appeared on several cooking programs and owns and operates an Italian-American restaurant in Collingswood, NJ. He is known by the moniker the "Kitchen Consigliere" due to his prior involvement with the Philadelphia mob scene in the 1990s that led to his conviction in 2001 as part of a broad investigation into illegal activities in the tri-state area.

== Early life ==
Angelo Lutz grew up in South Philadelphia graduating St. John Neumann High and subsequently working as a caterer and pasta salesman. He also worked as a card dealer in Atlantic City. During that time, he had a gambling problem, later stating that any business venture he attempted "I screwed it up from gambling."

== Mob years ==
Lutz frequented a social club at Sixth and Catharine Streets in South Philadelphia that was the headquarters for reputed mob boss Joseph "Skinny Joey" Merlino's organization in the mid-1990s, frequently bringing food such as pork chops cooked with baked beans and peppers, a dish that he later said Merlino particularly enjoyed. In November 1995, he played Santa Claus at Joey Merlino's Thanksgiving dinner party for the homeless, earning him the local nickname "Mob Santa."

In 2000, Angelo was one of seven defendants, including Merlino, named in a 36-count case that includes charges of murder, attempted murder, gambling, extortion, dealing in stolen property, and drug trafficking. He was the only defendant free on bail, appeared on television, radio and newspaper interviews, including a local sports talk radio morning show with a daily "Mob Update." Testifying in his own defense in July 2001, his testimony was laced with humorous banter that many of the spectators in the packed courtroom found funny.

In December 2001, he was convicted on racketeering, gambling and extortion charges. Although he was the only non-made defendant, he received the same sentence as two co-defendants who were formally initiated members of the mob, and more time than two other made members of the organization. U.S. District Judge Herbert Hutton sentenced him to nine years in prison, the maximum permitted under sentencing guidelines. The sentence was later reduced by almost a year on appeal.

The night before he entered prison, Lutz cooked for his own going-away party. Reporting the event, Fox 29 reporter Jen Frederick referred to Lutz as "the kitchen consigliere."

== The Kitchen Consigliere ==
After serving nearly seven years in federal prison for racketeering, Lutz was released in 2008. In 2010 he opened a small Mafia-themed restaurant in Collingswood, NJ called The Kitchen Consigliere, serving traditional Italian-American dishes inspired by his grandmother's cooking. It was very successful, serving 1,600 dinners a month and turning away 80 to 100 potential patrons weekly because of its limited seating. The success of the venue led to plans to expand in 2012. However, when Lutz applied for a conventional loan, he found his past convictions made it extremely difficult and he was turned down by several banks. He turned to private investors, and held a successful Indiegogo campaign, raising over $34,000 for renovations for a larger restaurant three times the size of his first location, with sconces shaped like nine-millimeter handguns and a mural featuring him with famous gangsters such as Don Corleone and Tony Soprano.

In December, 2014 he appeared in the episode "Sabotage is Coming to Town" of "Cutthroat Kitchen," on the Food Network. The same month, he appeared on QVC to sell foods inspired from his restaurant.
