= Angelo Panzetta =

American soccer player and coach

Personal information
- Date of birth: June 24, 1967 (age 59)
- Place of birth: Rochester, New York, U.S.
- Height: 6 ft 2 in (1.88 m)
- Position: Defender

Youth career
- 1985–1988: Rochester Institute of Technology

Senior career*
Years	Team	Apps	(Gls)
1989–1991	Baltimore Blast (indoor)	53	(5)
1991–1994	Harrisburg Heat (indoor)	115	(28)

Managerial career
- 1994–2000: Syracuse Orange (assistant)
- 2001–2022: Allegheny College
- * Club domestic league appearances and goals

Angelo Panzetta (born June 24, 1967) is an American retired soccer defender who played professionally in the Major Indoor Soccer League and National Professional Soccer League. He coached the Allegheny College men's soccer team for 21-years. His tenure started in 2001 and ended in 2022.

== Player ==
=== College ===
Panzetta attended the Rochester Institute of Technology where he was a three-time, First Team, NCAA Division III All American soccer player. In 1988, the Tigers lost to UC San Diego in the final of the NCAA Men's Division III Soccer Championship. He graduated in 1989 with a degree in applied mathematics. In 1994, RIT inducted Panzetta into its Athletic Hall of Fame.

=== Professional ===
In 1989, the Baltimore Blast selected Panzetta in the first round (eighth overall) of the Major Indoor Soccer League amateur draft. In January 1991, he suffered a season ending knee injury. The Blast released him on October 9, 1991. On October 19, 1991, Panzetta signed with the Harrisburg Heat of the National Professional Soccer League. Panzetta played until 1994 and is a member of the Heat Hall of Fame.

== Coach ==
On May 13, 1994, Syracuse University hired Panzetta as an assistant to its men's soccer team. In 2001, he moved to Allegheny College as head coach.
