= Angelo Novi =

Italian photographer and film actor

- Born: June 9, 1930; Lanzo d'Intelvi, Italy
- Died: May 6, 1997 (aged 66); Lanzo d'Intelvi, Italy
- Occupations: Photographer, film actor
- Years active: 1962–1997

Angelo Novi (9 June 1930 – 6 May 1997) was an Italian photographer and film actor.

== Biography ==
He collaborated on approximately 25 films between 1962 and 1997, the year of his death. Among his collaborations, those with the two directors Pier Paolo Pasolini and Sergio Leone were particularly significant. He also played the role of a friar in the film The Good, the Bad and the Ugly (1966), and later had a small part in the film My Name is Nobody (1973).
