= Angelo Tavanti =

Italian lawyer and statesman

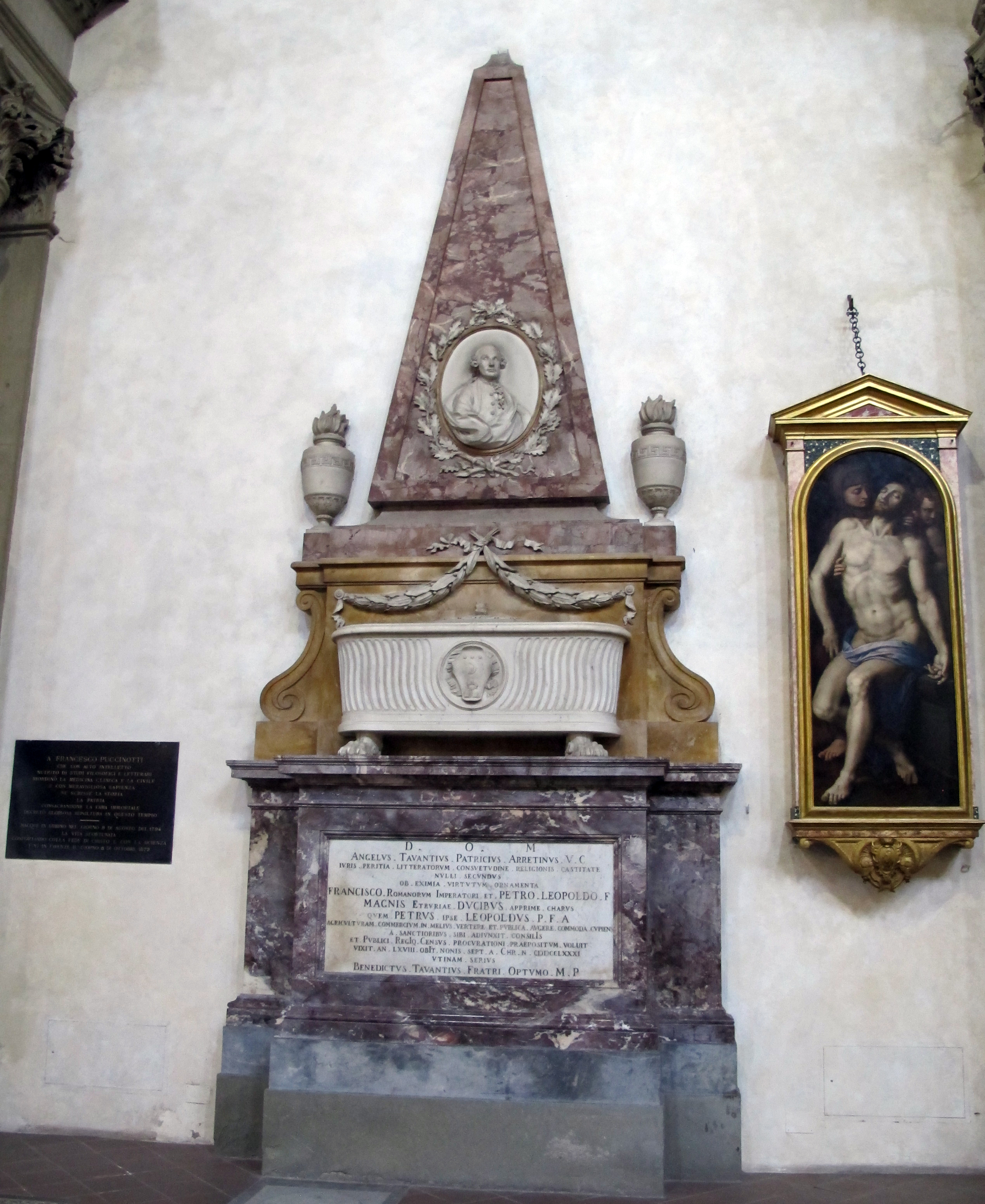
Tomb monument of Tavanti in the church of Santa Croce

Angelo or Angiolo Tavanti (24 January 1714 – 5 September 1781) was an Italian lawyer and statesman.

== Biography ==
Angelo was born in Arezzo, and there began his studies in the seminary, and then, under the patronage of Odoardo Corsini, moved to the School run by the Piarists in Florence. He completed his studies in law at the University of Pisa in 1739, and then spent some time in Rome. In 1748, he was recruited to Florence by Emmanuel de Nay, Count of Richecourt to become secretary in the Council of Finance of Tuscany. Over time he gained the admiration of the Grand Duke Peter Leopold, and in 1770 became its director of the council, one of the main ministerial positions in the Tuscan state.

As a statesman, he worked to eliminate government monopolies and tariffs in various trades and materials. He helped reform taxation under as system known as the catasto. It is claimed he tried to abolish the Roman Inquisition in Tuscany, but instead as secretary for the institution, he reformed its functions.
