= Angelo Tarchi =

Angelo Tarchi may refer to:

- Angelo Tarchi (composer)
- Angelo Tarchi (politician)
