= Angelo Dall'Oca Bianca =

Italian painter (1858–1942)

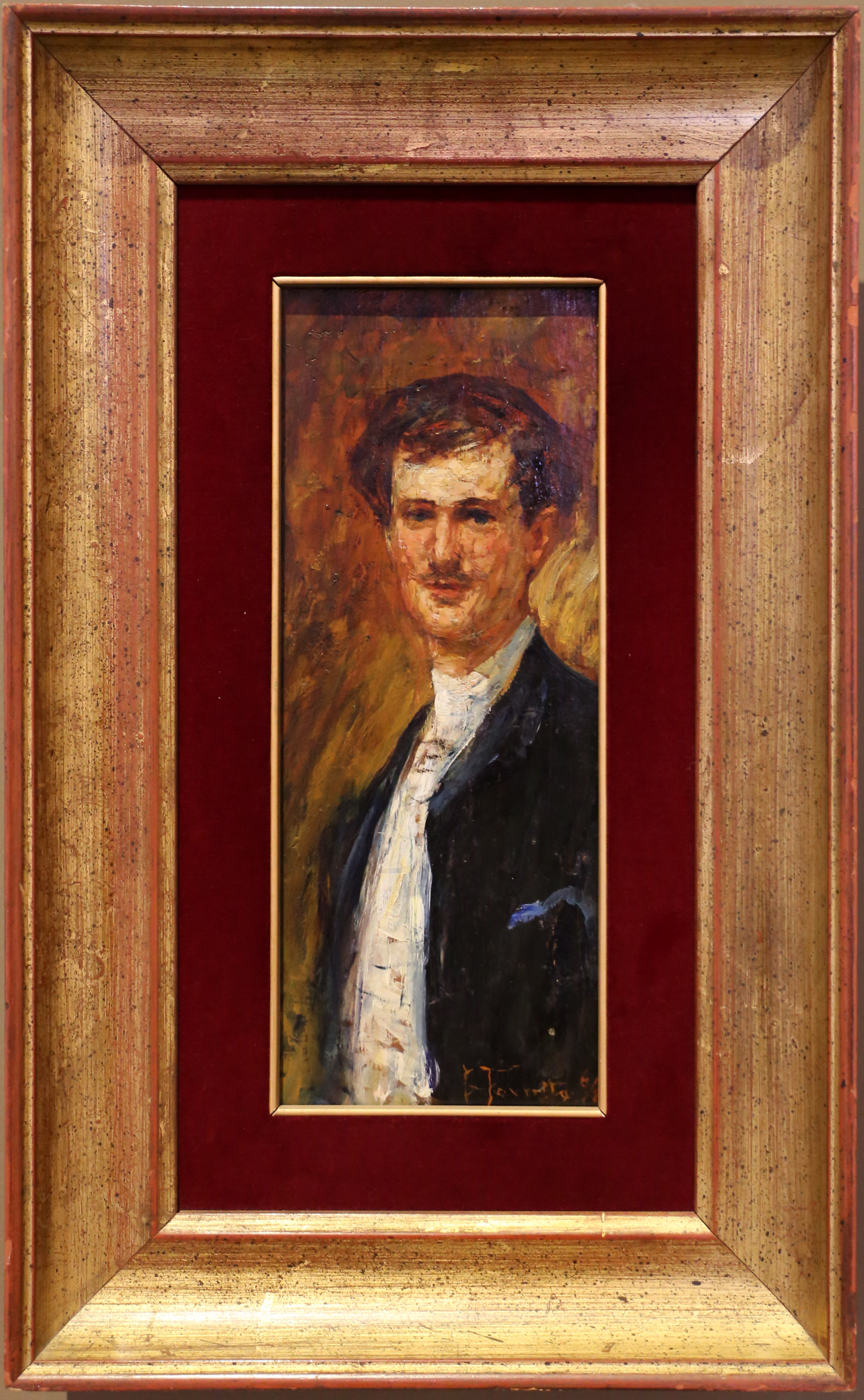
Portrait of Angelo Dall'Oca Bianca (1887), by Giacomo Favretto

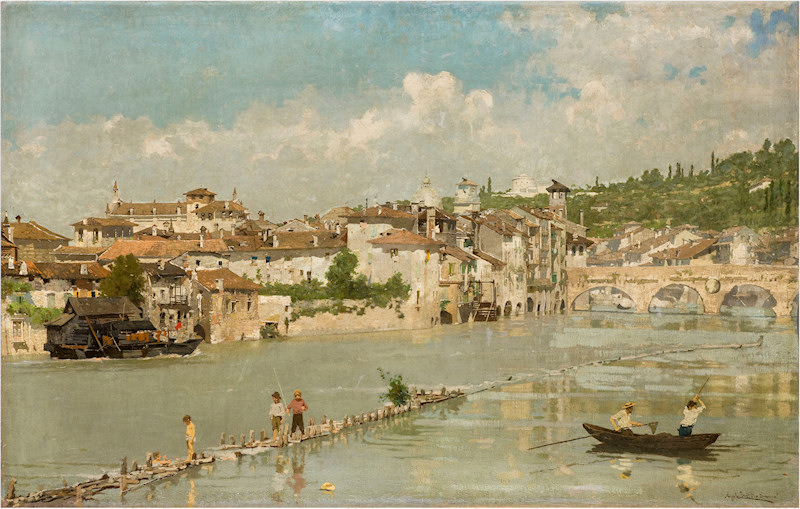
Pescatori di sabbia o Verona, 1884 ca. (Fondazione Cariplo)

Angelo Dall'Oca Bianca (1858 in Verona – 1942) was an Italian painter.

== Biography ==
A pupil of Napoleone Nani at the Cignaroli Academy in Verona from 1873 to 1876, the painter attended the course of nude studies at the Venice Academy of Fine Arts at the same time. A meeting with Giacomo Favretto had a marked impact on his early work, which moved towards pleasant genre painting set in Verona. It was in 1880 that his naturalistic output was influenced by a new interest in photography, which was to develop further through contact with the painter Francesco Paolo Michetti during a stay in Rome in 1882. He began to present works at the major national and European exhibitions, enjoying great success with the public and critics alike, in 1883. Participation in the Paris Universal Exhibition of 1900 coincided with a renewal of artistic vocabulary through the adoption of elements drawn from Divisionism and Symbolism and a broad awareness of developments on the European scenes. The first urban views, characterised by bright colours and bold contrasts, appeared in this connection. His career reached its peak in 1912 with a solo show of some 80 works within the framework of the Venice Biennale.

== Other projects ==
Media related to Angelo Dall'Oca Bianca at Wikimedia Commons
