= Angelo Chaves =

Brazilian footballer (born 2001)

Personal information
- Full name: Angelo Samuel Chaves
- Date of birth: 10 February 2001 (age 25)
- Place of birth: Curitiba, Brazil
- Height: 1.82 m (6 ft 0 in)
- Position: Left-back

Team information
- Current team: Brusque

Youth career
- Coritiba

Senior career*
Years	Team	Apps	(Gls)
2020–2023	Coritiba	3	(0)
2022	→ Brusque (loan)	5	(0)
2023	→ Portuguesa (loan)	2	(0)
2023–	Brusque	0	(0)
- * Club domestic league appearances and goals as of 13:46, 17 February 2023 (UTC)

Angelo Samuel Chaves (born 10 February 2001) is a Brazilian professional footballer who played as a left-back for Brusque. In 2024 he was traded to Esporte Clube Primavera.

== Career statistics ==
As of 17 February 2023.

Club	Season	League			State League		Cup		Continental		Other		Total	
Club	Season	Division	Apps	Goals	Apps	Goals	Apps	Goals	Apps	Goals	Apps	Goals	Apps	Goals
Coritiba	2020	Série A	2	0	—		—		—		—		2	0
Coritiba	2021	Série B	0	0	0	0	0	0	—		—		0	0
Coritiba	2022	Série A	0	0	1	0	0	0	—		—		1	0
Coritiba	Total		2	0	1	0	0	0	—		—		3	0
Brusque (loan)	2022	Série B	5	0	—		—		—		—		5	0
Portuguesa (loan)	2023	Paulista	—		2	0	—		—		—		2	0
Career total			7	0	3	0	0	0	0	0	0	0	10	0
