= Angelo Persia =

Italian footballer (born 1998)

Personal information
- Date of birth: 2 June 1998 (age 28)
- Place of birth: Avezzano, Italy
- Height: 1.75 m (5 ft 9 in)
- Position: Midfielder

Youth career
- –2010: Avezzano
- 2010–2014: Roma

Senior career*
Years	Team	Apps	(Gls)
2014–2015	Vigor Perconti		
2015–2018	Avezzano	55	(0)
2018–2019	Teramo	24	(0)
2019–2021	Fermana	13	(1)
2021	Campobasso	0	(0)
2021–2022	Campobasso	21	(3)
2022–2023	Piacenza	13	(1)
- * Club domestic league appearances and goals as of 22 April 2023

Angelo Persia (born 2 June 1998) is an Italian professional footballer who plays as a midfielder.

== Career ==
Born in Avezzano, Persia joined to Roma youth sector at 12 years old. He has a young career with many injuries. As a senior, he played three seasons with Avezzano on Serie D.

In July 2018, he signed with Serie C club Teramo. He made his professional debut on 26 September against Imolese.

On 5 September 2019, he joined to Fermana. On 28 January 2021, he left the club by mutual consent.

In February 2021, he moved to Campobasso, but due to injury he suspended his contract with the club for the rest of the season. For the next season, on 19 October 2021 he returned to Campobasso.

On 30 September 2022, Persia signed with Piacenza.
