= Angelo Felice Capelli =

Italian mathematician (1681–1749)

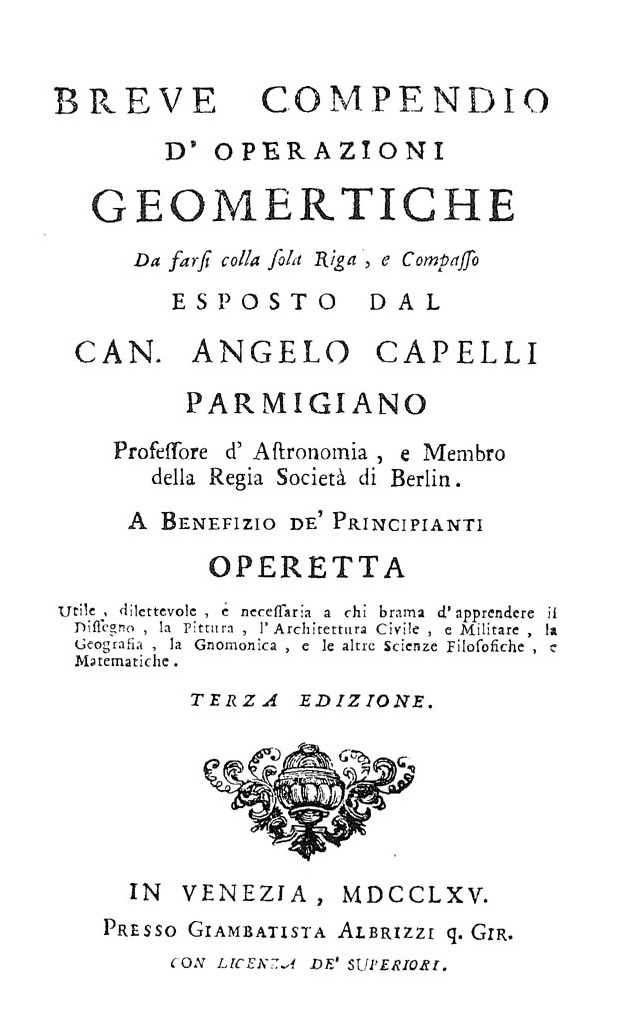
Breve compendio d'operazioni geometriche, 1765

Angelo Felice Capelli (Parma, Duchy of Parma and Piacenza 2 November 1681 – Ceneda, 16 November 1749) was an Italian mathematician and astronomer.

== Works ==
- Astrosophia numerica (in Latin). Vol. 1. Venice: Antonio Mora. 1733.
- Astrosophia numerica (in Latin). Vol. 2. Venice: Antonio Mora. 1736.
- Astrosophia numerica (in Latin). Vol. 3. Venice: Antonio Mora. 1737.
- Breve compendio d'operazioni geometriche da farsi colla sola riga, e compasso (in Italian). Venice: Giovanni Battista Albrizzi. 1765 [1741].
