= Angelo Ingrassia =

American judge

Angelo Ingrassia (March 23, 1923 – March 21, 2013) was an American jurist.

Ingrassia served in the United States Army during World War II. He received his law degree from Albany Law School and was admitted to the New York bar. He served as district attorney of Orange County, New York and then as judge of the Orange County court. In 1982, he was elected to the New York Supreme Court, serving until his retirement in 1999.
