= Angelo Paggi =

Italian philosopher

- Born: Mordecai Paggi; 4 May 1789; Siena, Grand Duchy of Tuscany
- Died: 7 June 1867 (aged 78); Florence, Kingdom of Italy
- Spouse: Benvenuta Bemporad
- Children: 7
- Writing career
- Language: Italian, Hebrew

Angelo Paggi (4 May 1789 – 7 June 1867), born Mordecai Paggi, was an Italian Jewish Hebraist, philologist and educator.

== Biography ==
Angelo Paggi was born in Siena to Ester Sorani and Sansone Paggi, both natives of Pitigliano. He received his Hebrew training under Leon Vita Monseles, and also studied Italian and Latin literature. His two brothers died in the typhoid epidemic of 1817, and Paggi was left providing for their families and his parents, sixteen individuals in total. He worked as a merchant in his hometown until 1823, when he abandoned the trade to open an educational institution, where he introduced a rational and logical method of teaching. He was principal of the Jewish school at Florence from 1836 to 1846, when failing health obliged him to retire, although he continued to write and teach in private. Among his pupils was Orientalist Fausto Lasinio, with whom he translated the hymns of St. Ephraem from the Syriac.

In his writings, Paggi tried to show how the study of Semitic languages, in particular Aramaic, could contribute to a better understanding of Dante. He also wrote Compendio di Tutte le Dottrine Israelitiche; Grammatica Ebraica; Grammatica Caldaico-Rabbinica; and he left several unpublished works: Storia Giudaica dalla Creazione del Mondo ai Nostri Giorni; Grammatica Ebraica e Rabbinica Compendiata ad Uso delle Scuole; Dizionario Ebraico-Italiano; Dizionario Caldaico-Rabbinico-Italiano; Dizionario Italiano-Ebraico-Caldaico-Rabbinico; Dissertazione Critica Sopra una Leggenda Talmudica; Poesie Ebraiche; Autobiografia; and Scritti di Pedagogia e Morale. A review by him of Ernest Renan's Vie de Jésus was published posthumously in the Vessillo Israelitico (June, 1879, et seq.).

Paggi died in Florence in 1867, and was survived by his seven children, Alessandro, Felice, Cesare, Giustino, Olimpia, Ottavia and Elisa. A Jewish girls boarding school, the Istituto-Convitto femminile Paggi di Firenze, was established by his wife Benvenuta and directed by their daughters Olimpia and Ottavia.
