= Angelo Bertolazzi =

Italian sculptor

- Born: 21 September 1896; Milan, Italy
- Died: 12 February 1963 (aged 66); Milan, Italy
- Occupation: Sculptor

Angelo Bertolazzi (21 September 1896 – 12 February 1963) was an Italian sculptor. His work was part of the sculpture event in the art competition at the 1932 Summer Olympics.
