= Angelo Luzzani =

Italian footballer and lawyer (1896-1960)

- Born: 1896; Como
- Died: 1960 (aged 63–64); Como
- Resting place: Como
- Education: University of Milan
- Occupation: lawyer
- Years active: 1919-1960
- Children: Dino Luzzani

Angelo Luzzani
Personal information
- Date of birth: 1896
- Place of birth: Como
- Date of death: 1960 (aged 63–64)
- Place of death: Como
- Position: Forward

Youth career
- ????–1912: Minerva Como

Senior career*
Years	Team	Apps	(Gls)
1912–1915	Calcio Como	41	(14)
- * Club domestic league appearances and goals

Angelo Luzzani (18 January 1896 – 1960) was an Italian lawyer and football player. He was born in Como, where he also died.

He was president of the Rotary Club of Como and Lecco, and president of his Provincial Bar association (Ordine degli avvocati).

== Professional life ==
Luzzani was born in a middle-class family and attended classical studies in his hometown. He graduated at the University of Milan in 1919 and established a law firm in Como, which he ran until his death.

A soldier in World War I for the Italian army, Luzzani was a refugee in Switzerland for most of the World War II years. He wasn't affiliated with the National Fascist Party.

He was co-director of the city's Sociale theatre from 1942 to 1955.

== Playing career ==
A player for student's club Minerva, Luzzani joined Calcio Como in 1912 when the two clubs merged. He played for three seasons (1912-1913, 1913-1914 and 1914–1915) for a total of 41 league games, in which he scored 14 goals. He won promotion to the Prima Divisione (the then top level of Italian football) in 1913 and scored twice in his first league debut against Brescia (November 17, 1912).

He left Como in 1915 due to the breakout of war and his football career never restarted.

== Bibliography ==
- 40º anno di fondazione dell'A. C. Como 1909-1949, Como 1949.
- Arringhe e scritti di Angelo Luzzani, Milan 1960.
- Enrico Levrini, Como 1907-2007 - Cent'anni in azzurro, Como 2007. ISBN 978-88-89016-05-3.
