= Angelo Zankl =

Father Angelo Zankl, O.S.B., (19 April 1901, Almena, Wisconsin – 12 July 2007, Collegeville) was the longest professed Benedictine monk in the world, serving for 86 years. He took monastic vows on July 11, 1921, at St. John's University in Collegeville, Minnesota, and was ordained a priest on May 29, 1926. He died on July 12, 2007, at the age of 106 years.

Father Theodore Heck, believed to be the oldest Benedictine monk in the world, died at the age of 108, his abbey in Indiana announced. Born in Iowa in 1901, Heck was less than a month shy of celebrating his 80th anniversary as a priest. This left Father Zankl with the longest career, but Father Heck as the oldest Benedictine monk.

On December 31, 2013, the Roman Catholic Diocese of Duluth named Zankl as one of 17 former priests credibly accused of child molestation.
