= Angelo Pasolini =

Italian footballer (1905–1959)

Personal information
- Date of birth: October 4, 1905
- Place of birth: Orzinuovi, Italy
- Date of death: 19 February 1959 (aged 53)
- Place of death: Brescia, Italy
- Position: Defender

Senior career*
Years	Team	Apps	(Gls)
1925–1932	Brescia	172	(2)
1932–1934	Roma	56	(0)
1934–1938	Pisa	113	(0)
- * Club domestic league appearances and goals

Angelo Pasolini (4 October 1905 – 19 February 1959) was an Italian professional football player.

He played for 5 seasons (149 games, 2 goals) in the Serie A for Brescia Calcio and A.S. Roma.
