= Gonzalo Herrera Olivares =

Roman Catholic prelate

The Most Reverend Gonzalo Herrera Olivares
- Archbishop of Burgos
- Church: Catholic Church
- Archdiocese: Archdiocese of Burgos
- In office: 1568–1579

Orders
- Consecration: 25 July 1568 by Scipione Rebiba

Personal details
- Died: 20 September 1579 Burgos, Spain

Gonzalo Herrera Olivares (died 20 September 1579) was a Roman Catholic prelate, who served as Auxiliary Bishop of Burgos (1568–1579).

== Biography ==
On 23 July 1568, Gonzalo Herrera Olivares was appointed during the papacy of Pope Pius V as Auxiliary Bishop of Burgos and Titular Bishop of Laodicea in Phrygia. On 25 July 1568, he was consecrated bishop by Scipione Rebiba, Cardinal-Priest of Sant'Angelo in Pescheria, with Felice Peretti Montalto, Bishop of Sant'Agata de' Goti, and Umberto Locati, Bishop of Bagnoregio, serving as co-consecrators. He served as Auxiliary Bishop of Burgos until his death on 20 September 1579. While bishop, he was the principal co-consecrator of Sebastián Lartaún, Bishop of Cuzco (1571).
