= Nicolò Vernely =

Italian Roman Catholic bishop (died 1563)

Most Reverend Nicolò Vernely
- Bishop of Bagnoregio
- Church: Catholic Church
- Diocese: Diocese of Bagnoregio
- In office: 1545–1563
- Predecessor: Francisco de Solís Quiñones y Montenegro
- Successor: Galeazzo Gegald

Orders
- Consecration: 30 May 1547 by Giovanni Giacomo Barba

Personal details
- Died: 1563 Bagnoregio, Italy

Nicolò Vernely or Nicolò Verneey (died 1563) was a Roman Catholic prelate who served as Bishop of Bagnoregio (1545–1563).

== Biography ==
On 22 May 1545, Nicolò Vernely was appointed during the papacy of Pope Paul III as Bishop of Bagnoregio. On 30 May 1547, he was consecrated bishop in the Sistine Chapel by Giovanni Giacomo Barba, Bishop of Teramo. He served as Bishop of Bagnoregio until his death in 1563.

While bishop, he was the principal co-consecrator of Bernardino Maffei, Bishop of Massa Marittima (1547).

== External links and additional sources ==
- Cheney, David M. "Diocese of Bagnoregio (Bagnorea)". Catholic-Hierarchy.org. (for Chronology of Bishops) ^{[self-published]}
- Chow, Gabriel. "Titular Episcopal See of Bagnoregio (Italy)". GCatholic.org. (for Chronology of Bishops) ^{[self-published]}

Catholic Church titles
Preceded by Francisco de Solís Quiñones y Montenegro	Bishop of Bagnoregio; 1545–1563	Succeeded by Galeazzo Gegald
