= Francesco Serini =

Italian Roman Catholic bishop (1598)

Most Reverend Francesco Serini
- Bishop of Bagnoregio
- Church: Catholic Church
- Diocese: Diocese of Bagnoregio
- In office: 1590–1598
- Predecessor: Tommaso Sperandio Corbelli
- Successor: Carlo Trotti

Personal details
- Died: 6 September 1598 Bagnoregio, Italy

Francesco Serini (died 6 September 1598) was a Roman Catholic prelate who served as Bishop of Bagnoregio (1590–1598).

On 16 July 1590, Francesco Serini was appointed during the papacy of Pope Sixtus V as Bishop of Bagnoregio. He served as Bishop of Bagnoregio until his death on 6 September 1598. While bishop, he was the principal co-consecrator of Arnaud d'Ossat, Bishop of Rennes.

== External links and additional sources ==
- Cheney, David M. "Diocese of Bagnoregio (Bagnorea)". Catholic-Hierarchy.org. (for Chronology of Bishops) ^{[self-published]}
- Chow, Gabriel. "Titular Episcopal See of Bagnoregio (Italy)". GCatholic.org. (for Chronology of Bishops) ^{[self-published]}

Catholic Church titles
Preceded by Tommaso Sperandio Corbelli	Bishop of Bagnoregio; 1590–1598	Succeeded by Carlo Trotti
