= Carlo Trotti =

Roman catholic

Most Reverend Carlo Trotti
- Bishop of Bagnoregio
- Church: Catholic Church
- Diocese: Diocese of Bagnoregio
- In office: 1598–1612
- Predecessor: Francesco Serini
- Successor: Lelio Ruini

Personal details
- Died: 27 September 1612 Bagnoregio, Italy

Carlo Trotti (died 27 September 1612) was a Roman Catholic prelate who served as Bishop of Bagnoregio (1598–1612).

== Biography ==
On 9 October 1598, Carlo Trotti was appointed during the papacy of Pope Clement VIII as Bishop of Bagnoregio. He served as Bishop of Bagnoregio until his death on 27 September 1612. While bishop, he was the principal co-consecrator of Camillo Beccio, Bishop of Acqui.

== External links and additional sources ==
- Cheney, David M. "Diocese of Bagnoregio (Bagnorea)". Catholic-Hierarchy.org. (for Chronology of Bishops) ^{[self-published]}
- Chow, Gabriel. "Titular Episcopal See of Bagnoregio (Italy)". GCatholic.org. (for Chronology of Bishops) ^{[self-published]}

Catholic Church titles
Preceded by Francesco Serini	Bishop of Bagnoregio; 1598–1612	Succeeded by Lelio Ruini
