= Tommaso Sperandio Corbelli =

Italian Roman Catholic bishop (died 1590)

Most Reverend Tommaso Sperandio Corbelli
- Bishop of Bagnoregio
- Church: Catholic Church
- Diocese: Diocese of Bagnoregio
- In office: 1581–1590
- Predecessor: Umberto Locati
- Successor: Francesco Serini
- Previous post: Bishop of Trogir (1567–1574)

Orders
- Consecration: 11 May 1567 by Egidio Valenti

Personal details
- Died: 1590 Bagnoregio, Italy

Tommaso Sperandio Corbelli (died 1590) was a Roman Catholic prelate who served as Bishop of Bagnoregio (1581–1590) and Bishop of Trogir (1567–1574).

== Biography ==
On 18 April 1567, Tommaso Sperandio Corbelli was appointed during the papacy of Pope Pius V as Bishop of Trogir. On 11 May 1567, he was consecrated bishop by Egidio Valenti, Bishop of Nepi e Sutri, with Giovanni Delfino, Bishop of Torcello, and Galeazzo Gegald, Bishop of Bagnoregio, serving as co-consecrators. He resigned as Bishop of Trogir on 10 March 1574. On 29 May 1581, he was appointed during the papacy of Pope Gregory XIII as Bishop of Bagnoregio. He served as Bishop of Bagnoregio until his death in 1590.

== External links and additional sources ==
- Cheney, David M. "Diocese of Bagnoregio (Bagnorea)". Catholic-Hierarchy.org. (for Chronology of Bishops) ^{[self-published]}
- Chow, Gabriel. "Titular Episcopal See of Bagnoregio (Italy)". GCatholic.org. (for Chronology of Bishops) ^{[self-published]}
- Cheney, David M. "Diocese of Trogir (Traù)". Catholic-Hierarchy.org. (for Chronology of Bishops)^{self-published}
- Chow, Gabriel. "Titular Episcopal See of Trogir (Croatia)". GCatholic.org. (for Chronology of Bishops)^{self-published}

Catholic Church titles
Preceded by Luigi Cornaro	Bishop of Trogir; 1567–1574	Succeeded by Antonio Guidi
Preceded by Umberto Locati	Bishop of Bagnoregio; 1581–1590	Succeeded by Francesco Serini
