= Angelo Pisani =

Roman Catholic bishop

Most Reverend Angelo Pisani
- Bishop of Bagnoregio
- Church: Catholic Church
- Diocese: Diocese of Bagnoregio
- In office: 1462–1475
- Predecessor: Filippo Landolfi
- Successor: Pietro Bocca

Personal details
- Died: 1475 Bagnoregio, Italy

Angelo Pisani (died 1475) was a Roman Catholic prelate who served as Bishop of Bagnoregio (1462–1475).

== Biography ==
On 26 April 1462, Angelo Pisani was appointed during the papacy of Pope Pius II as Bishop of Bagnoregio. He served as Bishop of Bagnoregio until his death in 1475 (although his death date is not certain).

== External links and additional sources ==
- Cheney, David M. "Diocese of Bagnoregio (Bagnorea)". Catholic-Hierarchy.org. (for Chronology of Bishops) ^{[self-published]}
- Chow, Gabriel. "Titular Episcopal See of Bagnoregio (Italy)". GCatholic.org. (for Chronology of Bishops) ^{[self-published]}

Catholic Church titles
Preceded by Filippo Landolfi	Bishop of Bagnoregio; 1462–1475	Succeeded by Pietro Bocca
