= Antonio da San Gimignano =

Italian Roman Catholic bishop (died 1496)

Most Reverend Antonio da San Gimignano
- Bishop of Bagnoregio
- Church: Catholic Church
- Diocese: Diocese of Bagnoregio
- In office: 1488–1496
- Predecessor: Pietro Bocca
- Successor: Bartolomé Martí

Personal details
- Died: 1496 Bagnoregio, Italy

Antonio da San Gimignano (died 1496) was a Roman Catholic prelate who served as Bishop of Bagnoregio (1488–1496).

== Biography ==
On 21 May 1488, Antonio da San Gimignano was appointed during the papacy of Pope Innocent VIII as Bishop of Bagnoregio. He served as Bishop of Bagnoregio until his death which is listed as 1496 or 1497.

While bishop, he was the principal consecrator of Henri d'Aradon, Auxiliary Bishop of Vannes (1490), and Gaspard de Toriglia, Bishop of Santa Giusta (1494).

== External links and additional sources ==
- Cheney, David M. "Diocese of Bagnoregio (Bagnorea)". Catholic-Hierarchy.org. (for Chronology of Bishops) ^{[self-published]}
- Chow, Gabriel. "Titular Episcopal See of Bagnoregio (Italy)". GCatholic.org. (for Chronology of Bishops) ^{[self-published]}

Catholic Church titles
Preceded by Pietro Bocca	Bishop of Bagnoregio; 1488–1496	Succeeded by Bartolomé Martí
