= Galeazzo Gegald =

Italian Roman Catholic bishop (fl. 1563–1568)

Most Reverend Galeazzo Gegald Gallois de Regard
- Bishop of Bagnoregio
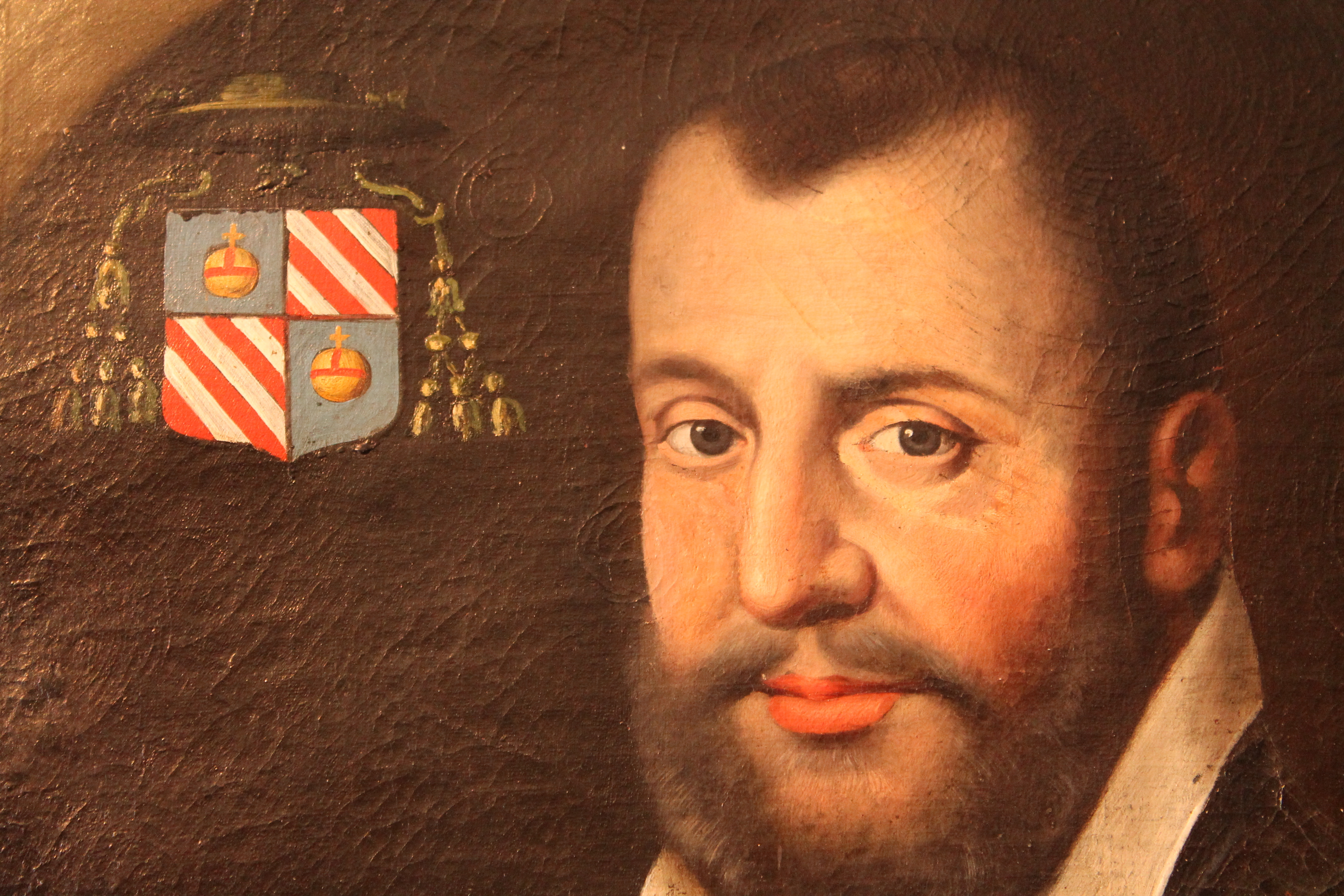
- Church: Catholic Church
- Diocese: Diocese of Bagnoregio
- In office: 1563–1568
- Predecessor: Nicolò Vernely
- Successor: Umberto Locati

Personal details
- Died: Bagnoregio, Italy

Galeazzo Gegald or Galeazzo Regardus (French: Gallois de Regard) was a Roman Catholic prelate who served as Bishop of Bagnoregio (1563–1568).

== Biography ==
On 15 October 1563, Galeazzo Gegald was appointed during the papacy of Pope Pius IV as Bishop of Bagnoregio. He served as Bishop of Bagnoregio until his resignation in 1568.

== Episcopal succession ==
While bishop, he was the principal consecrator of:

- Claude de Granier, Bishop of Geneva (1579);

and the principal co-consecrator of:

- Giuliano de' Medici, Bishop of Béziers (1567);
- Tommaso Sperandio Corbelli, Bishop of Trogir (1567);
- Andrea Minucci, Archbishop of Zadar (1568);
- Vincenzo Ercolano, Bishop of Sarno (1570);
- Donato Stampa, Bishop of Nepi e Sutri (1570);
- Claude de La Baume, Archbishop of Besançon (1570);
- Nicolò Ormanetto, Bishop of Padua (1570); and
- Wolfgang Holl, Auxiliary Bishop of Eichstätt (1570).

== External links and additional sources ==
- Cheney, David M. "Diocese of Bagnoregio (Bagnorea)". Catholic-Hierarchy.org. (for Chronology of Bishops) ^{[self-published]}
- Chow, Gabriel. "Titular Episcopal See of Bagnoregio (Italy)". GCatholic.org. (for Chronology of Bishops) ^{[self-published]}

Catholic Church titles
Preceded by Nicolò Vernely	Bishop of Bagnoregio; 1563–1568	Succeeded by Umberto Locati
