= History of education in Spain =

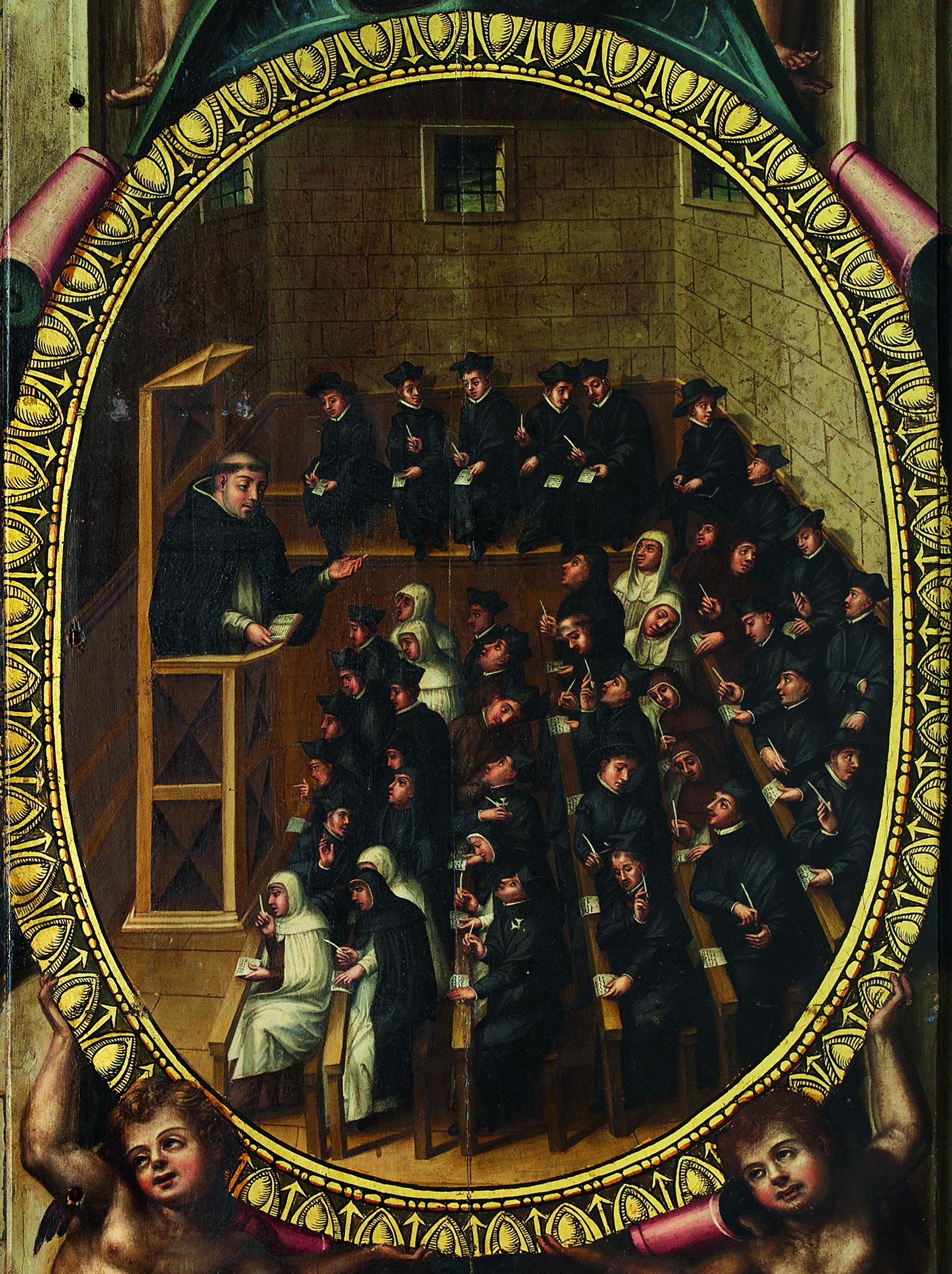
Lecture on Theology at the University of Salamanca, with students from various religious orders. Martín de Cervera (1614).

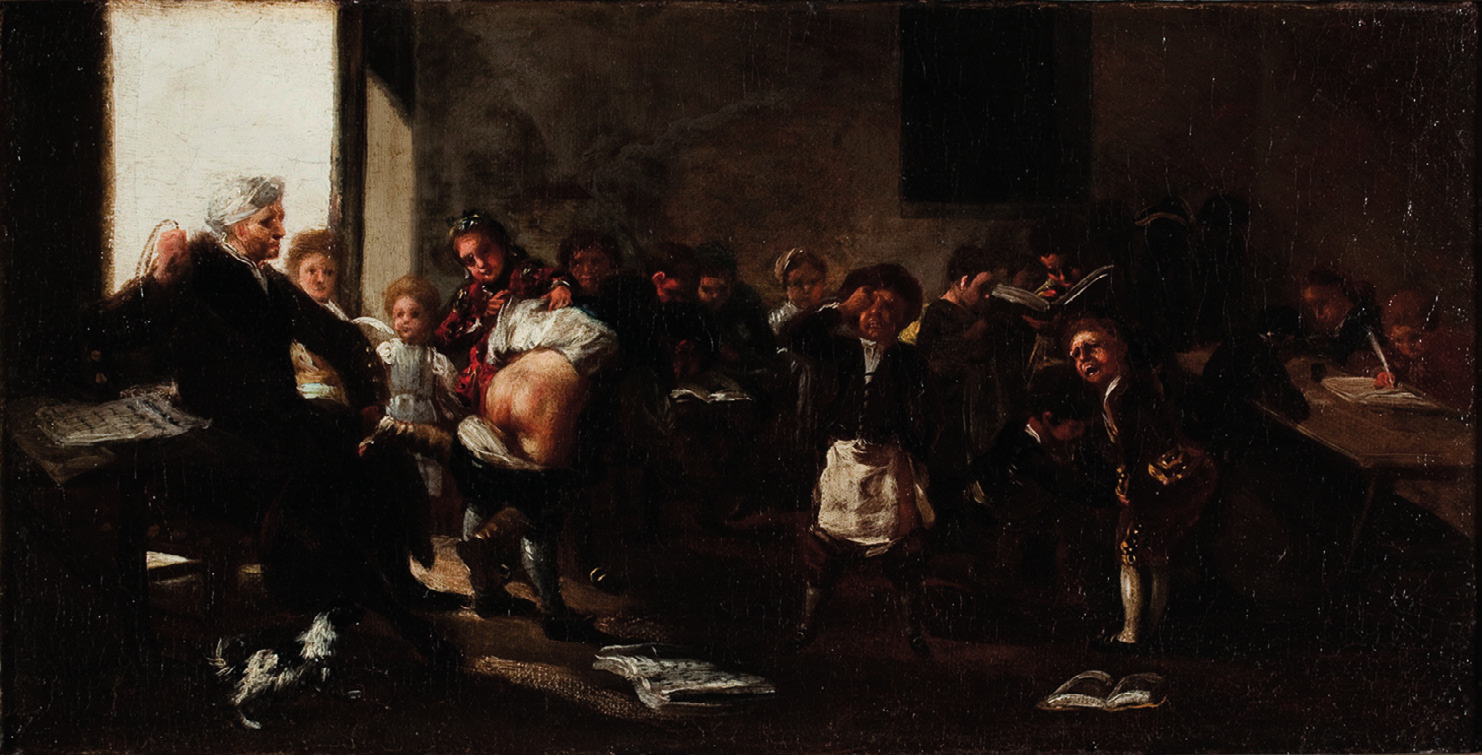
With Pain Comes Gain, by Francisco de Goya (1780s). The work shows a scene in a school where the teacher is whipping a pupil, who uncovers his buttocks to receive the punishment. Next to him are other pupils crying after having received the same lesson.

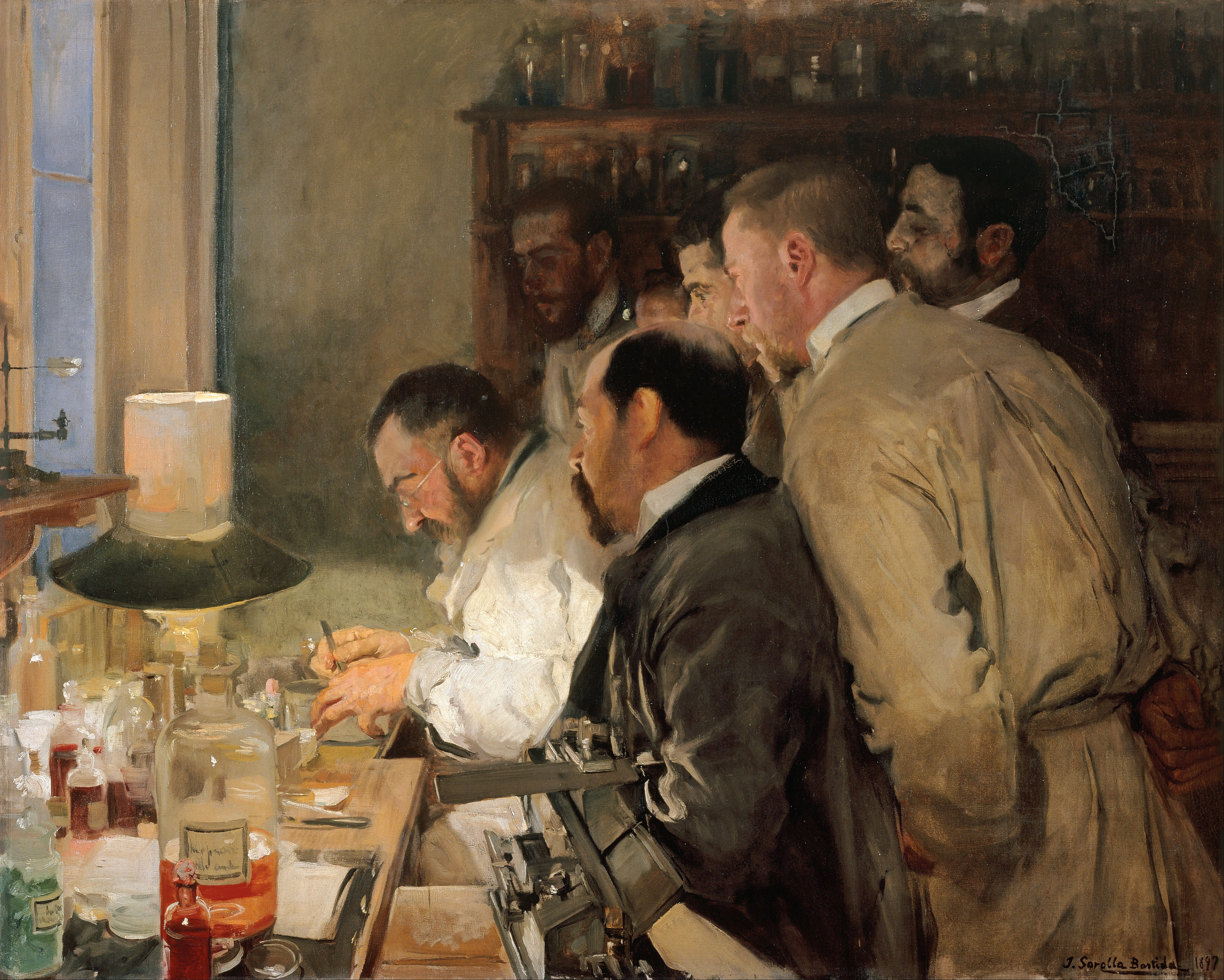
An Investigation ( 1897), by Joaquín Sorolla. The painting shows a lesson inside the laboratory of the neurologist Luis Simarro at the end of the 19th century.

The history of education in Spain is marked by political struggles and the progress of modern societies. It began in the late Middle Ages, very close to the clergy and the nobility, and during the Renaissance it passed into the domain of a thriving bourgeois class that led an incipient enlightenment in the so-called Age of Enlightenment. The Constitution of 1812 and the drive of the liberals originated the contemporary education.

== Ancient Age ==
The Romanization of Hispania led to the creation of educational institutions. The sources record the foundation by Sertorius, around 80 BC, of a peculiar "academy" in Osca (Huesca) where the children of the local elites were educated.

But it was the children that won them over the most. For the noblest of the people were gathered in Osca, an important city, and brought teachers of Greek and Roman teachings and, in fact, he used them as hostages, but in words he educated them to make them participants, when they were men, of the government and power. Plutarch, Parallel Lives.

Archaeological remains have been preserved of the so-called "House of Hippolytus" at Complutum (Alcalá de Henares), dating from the 3rd and 4th centuries, a school for young people linked to the Anios family, with recreational and educational uses.

Late Antiquity did not entail a total break with the Roman tradition, although in educational institutions the most important effect was its restriction to the Christian religious sphere, particularly the monastic one. The possible existence of a palatine school in Visigothic Toledo, which could be attended by high nobles, including some women, has been pointed out.

== Middle Ages ==
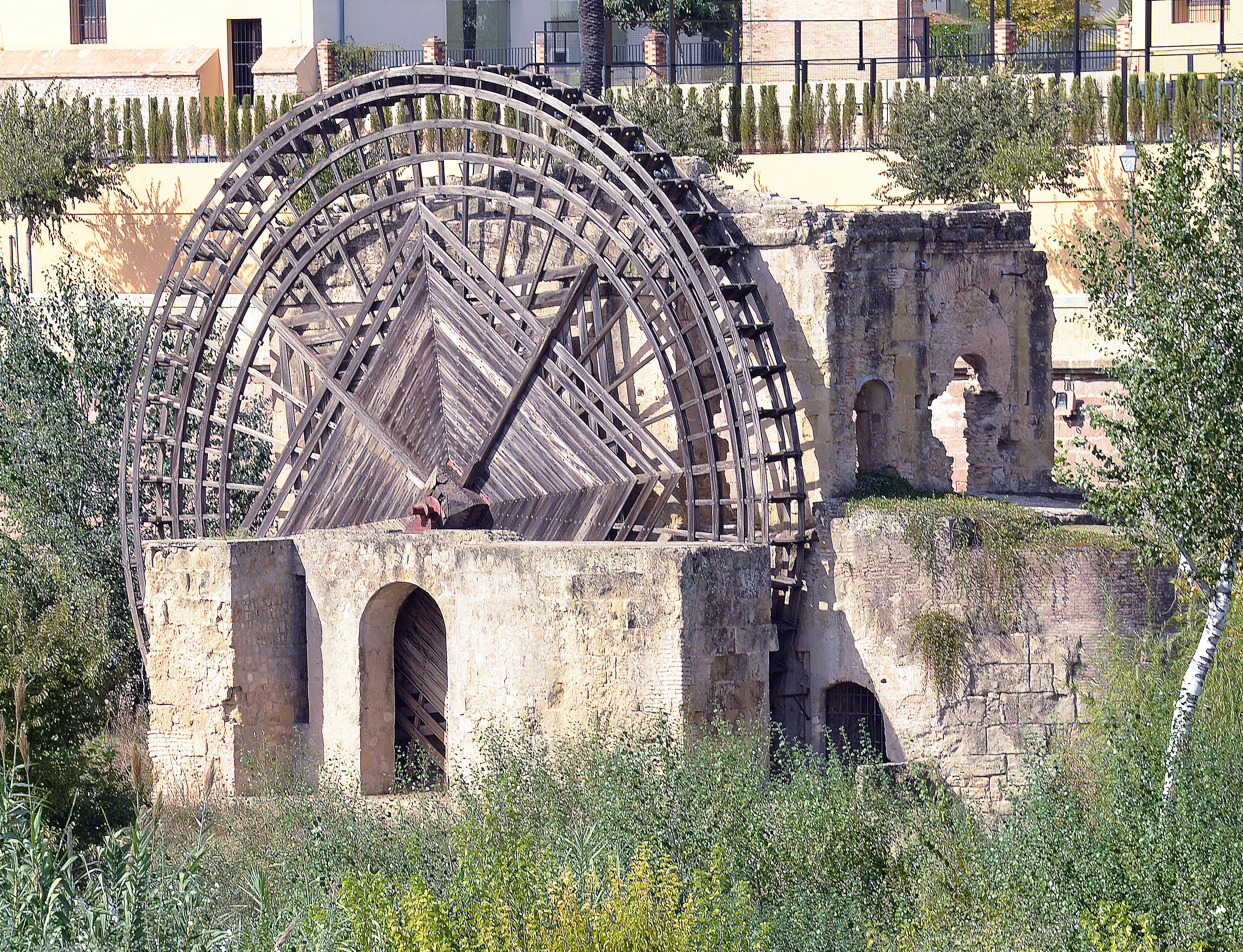
Remains of the Albolafia mill in Córdoba. Several theories suggest that this was the first place in Europe where paper was produced in an organised way, which was used to supply the 70 or so large libraries that existed in the city in the Caliphate period, such as that of Alhaken II.

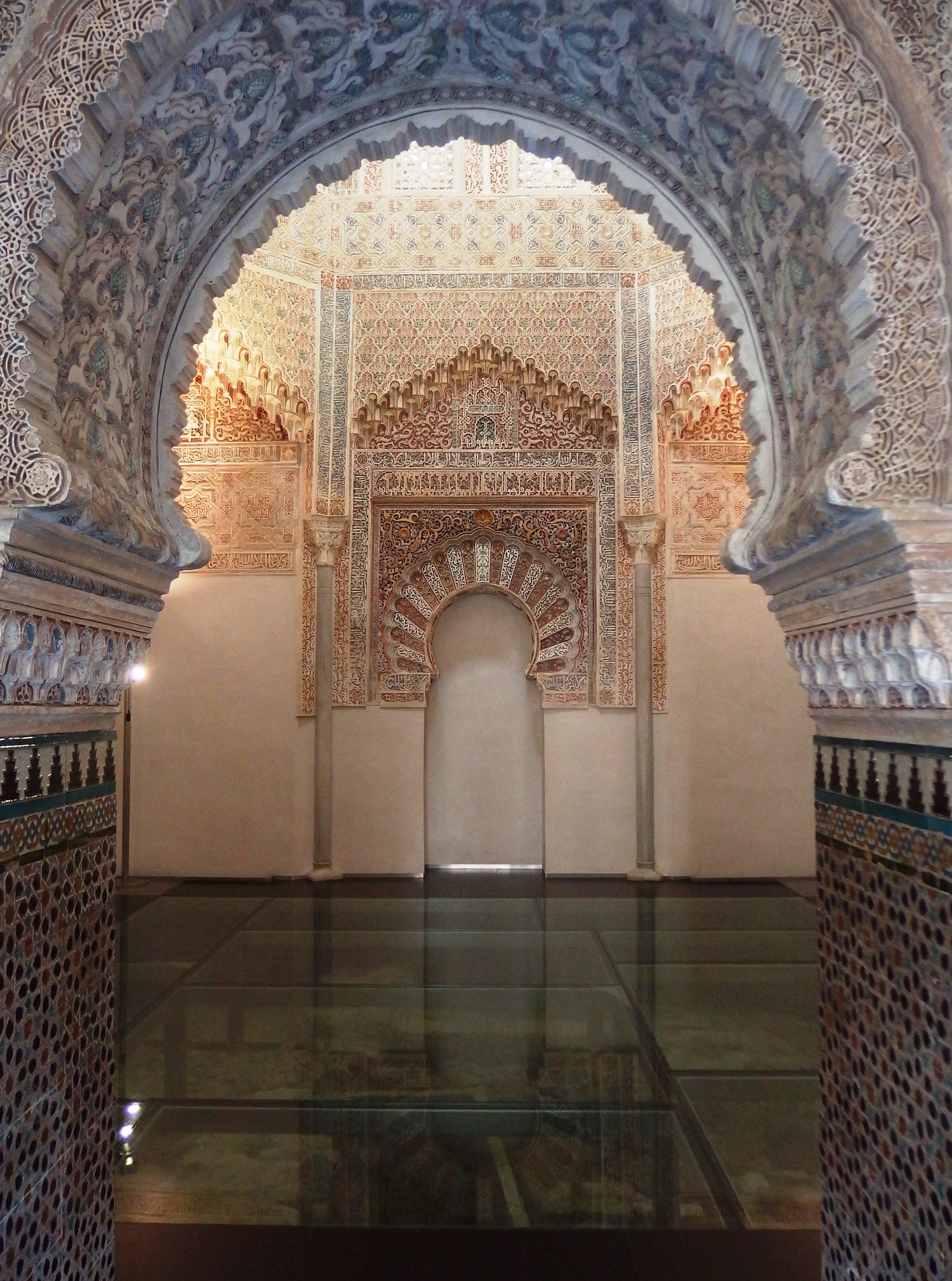
Oratory of the Madrasa in Granada, the best preserved of the many that existed in al-Andalus.

The presence in medieval Spain of the three monotheistic religions (Jews, Christians and Muslims) also meant the existence of different educational institutions.

From ancient times, the dioceses used to have schools attached to the cathedral, the cathedral schools, whose initial purpose was to teach future priests, but as they were the only centre of education, they gradually admitted secular individuals as well. In the 13th century, King Alfonso VIII of Castile elevated the Palencia school to the rank of Estudio General (1212). Probably, the King of León, Alfonso IX, founded the Estudio General de Salamanca (1218), which would be called "University" by Alfonso X the Wise, at such an early date (1253) that it probably implies that it would have been the first to bear that title.

Teaching in these institutions took place in the cathedral premises and in rented buildings, but colleges were also founded to prepare for the university exams, and even earlier. In Salamanca, the first was the Colegio de Santa María de la Vega, of the Order of Canons Regular of Saint Augustine, founded in 1166 (prior to the foundation of the Estudio General) and in 1222 the Colegio de San Esteban. In 1401, Bishop Diego de Anaya founded the first Colegio Mayor, that of San Bartolomé, for poor students, endowing it with sufficient income to provide scholarships. Anaya took as his model the Royal College of Spain in Bologna, founded in 1364 by Cardinal Gil de Albornoz. Successively, other schools, both menor and mayor, were established, almost all with the same orientationː to provide education for poor and capable students.

Subsequently, other Estudios Generales and Universities were created.

In these establishments, the degrees of Bachelor, Licentiate, Master (or Magister, what is now called master's degree) and Doctor were successively awarded. The organisation was quite democratic, led by a rector elected annually by students. Although largely a nominal figure, akin to a modern ceremonial head of state who doesn't govern, the rector held immense symbolic importance. He presided over ceremonies and awarded degrees, and his rank at academic events was second only to the king. The real government of the university was exercised by the Master-scholar, who had his own police force and even a prison, since the students enjoyed a privilege that prevented the local authorities from taking action against them.

== Modern Age ==
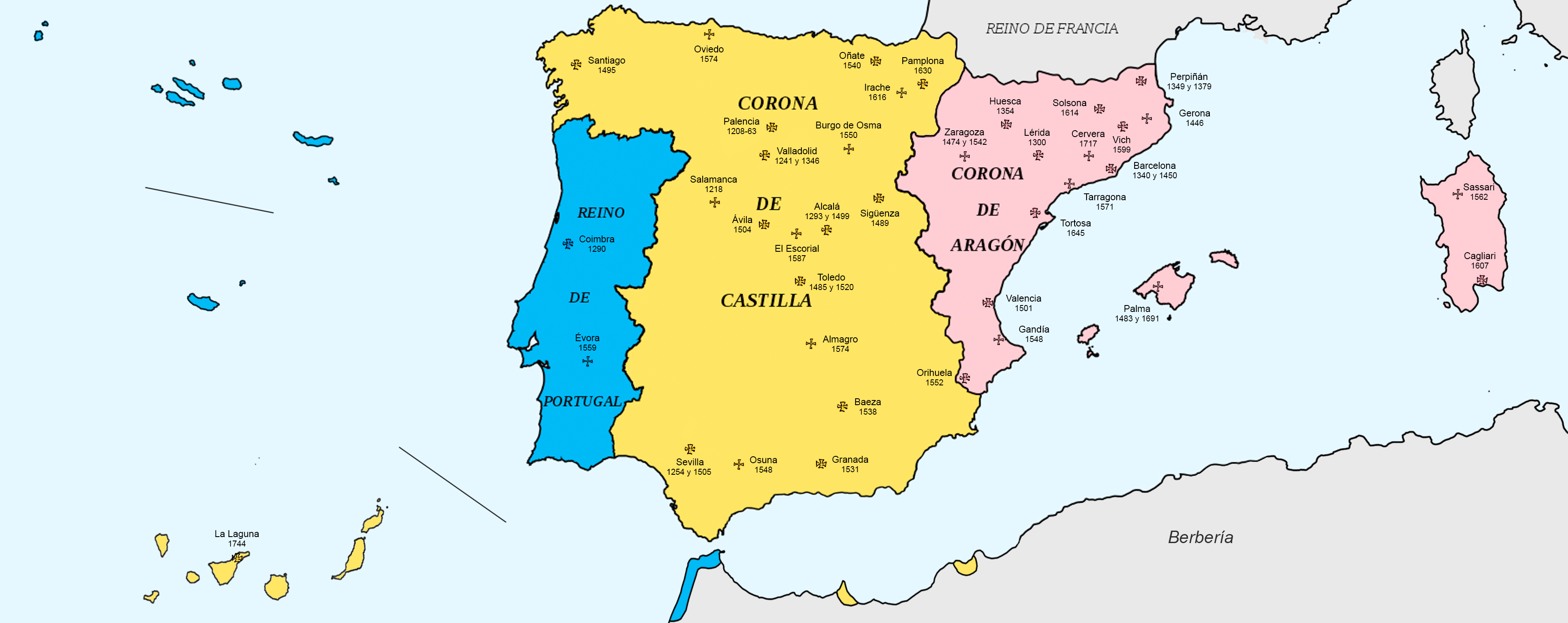
Map of the Spanish universities created during the Golden Age in the Iberian Peninsula.

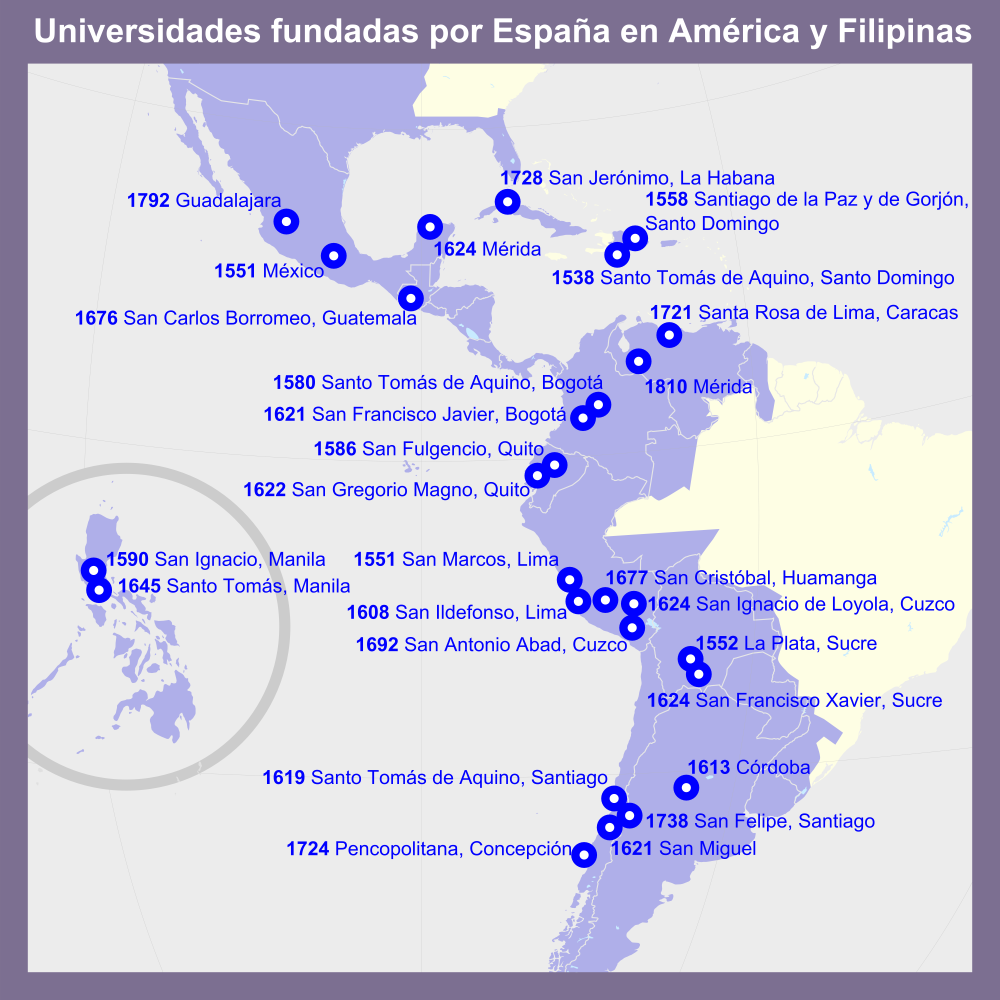
Map of the viceregal universities created during the Golden Age and the Enlightenment in the overseas colonies.

It covers the period between the 16th and 17th centuries, with an important inflection point at the end of the 16th century. If until then the university was a relatively meritocratic institution (as has been said, many of the mayor and mejor colleges were intended for poor students), the prestige that came with studying at certain universities, especially the major colleges, meant that these, and the university itself, were dominated by noble students. They made use of various tricks, such as the democratic system in the functioning of the Colleges or in the election of the rector and even demanded cleanliness of blood, something that only those with family records, that is, the nobles, could prove.

Spanish education in the late 15th and early 16th centuries was influenced by humanism, which was promoted by the Catholic Monarchs. They influenced members of the court to devote themselves to the study of letters and to behave in a manner befitting their class.

=== Humanism ===
==== Nobility ====
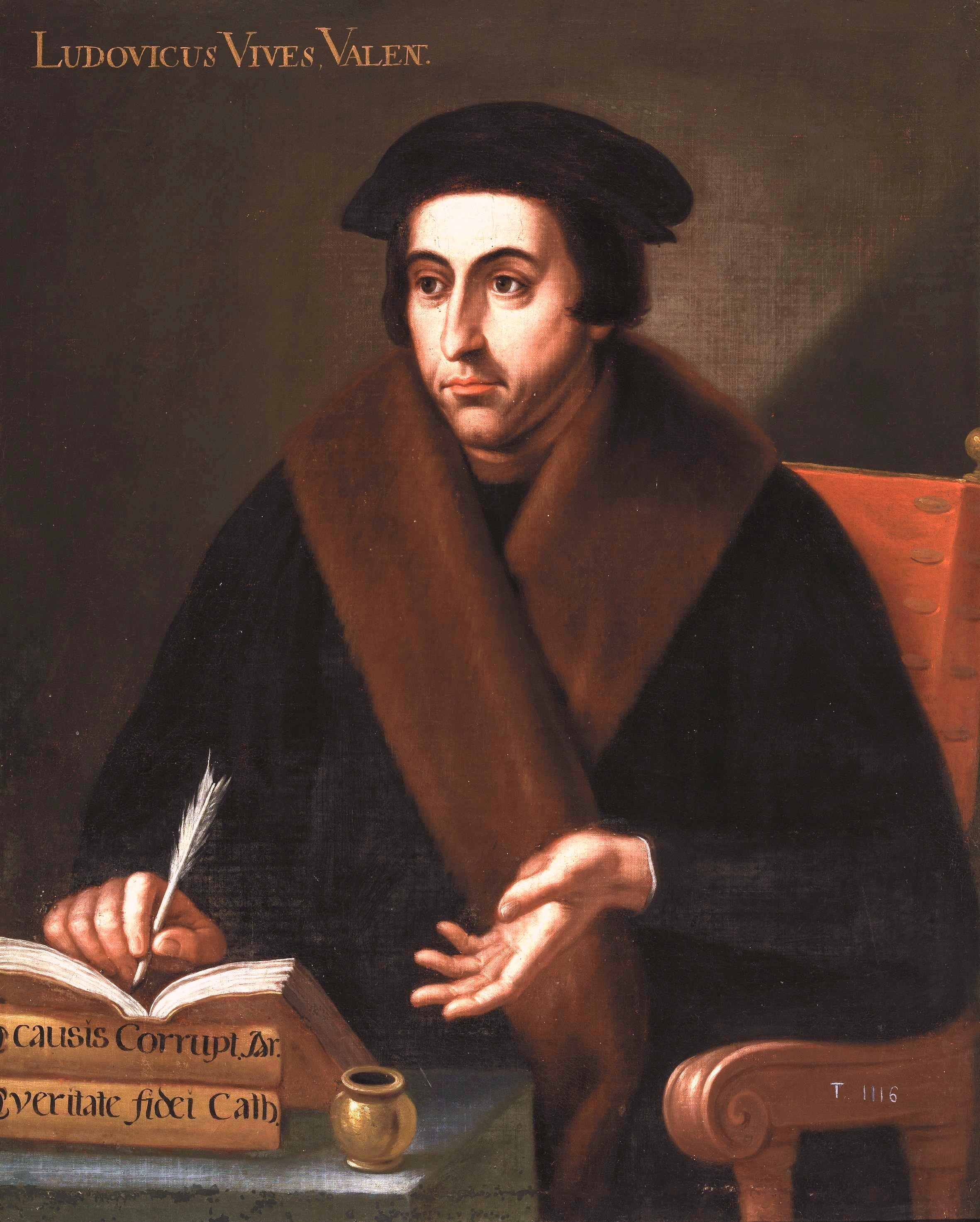
Juan Luis Vives.

The princes and infantes, together with some children from important families, studied in the royal classroom with the most renowned humanists. Numerous treatises were written for them with the aim of educating future rulers. Their preparation was based on physical education, since the princes had to be agile and leaders of armies, they trained in jumping, javelin, self-defence, use of the sword and lance, horseback riding and hunting; in the study of classical authors and history. But although they read classical authors, they were instilled with admiration and respect for saints, Christian figures and God. They were also taught manners, such as courtesy for diplomacy or proper behaviour at ceremonies. The sons of the nobles studied at the palatine school run by Peter Martyr d'Anghiera, to later study at the universities and gain access to bureaucratic and administrative positions.

Women gained particular attention, as the importance of their education as preservers of religion and morals was recognised, and this was reflected in the writing of various treatises. Juan Luis Vives wrote in 1523 one of the most renowned treatises: On the Instruction of Christian women (De la Instrucción de la mujer cristiana), in which religious reading acquires a relevant role in women's education.

==== Bourgeoisie ====
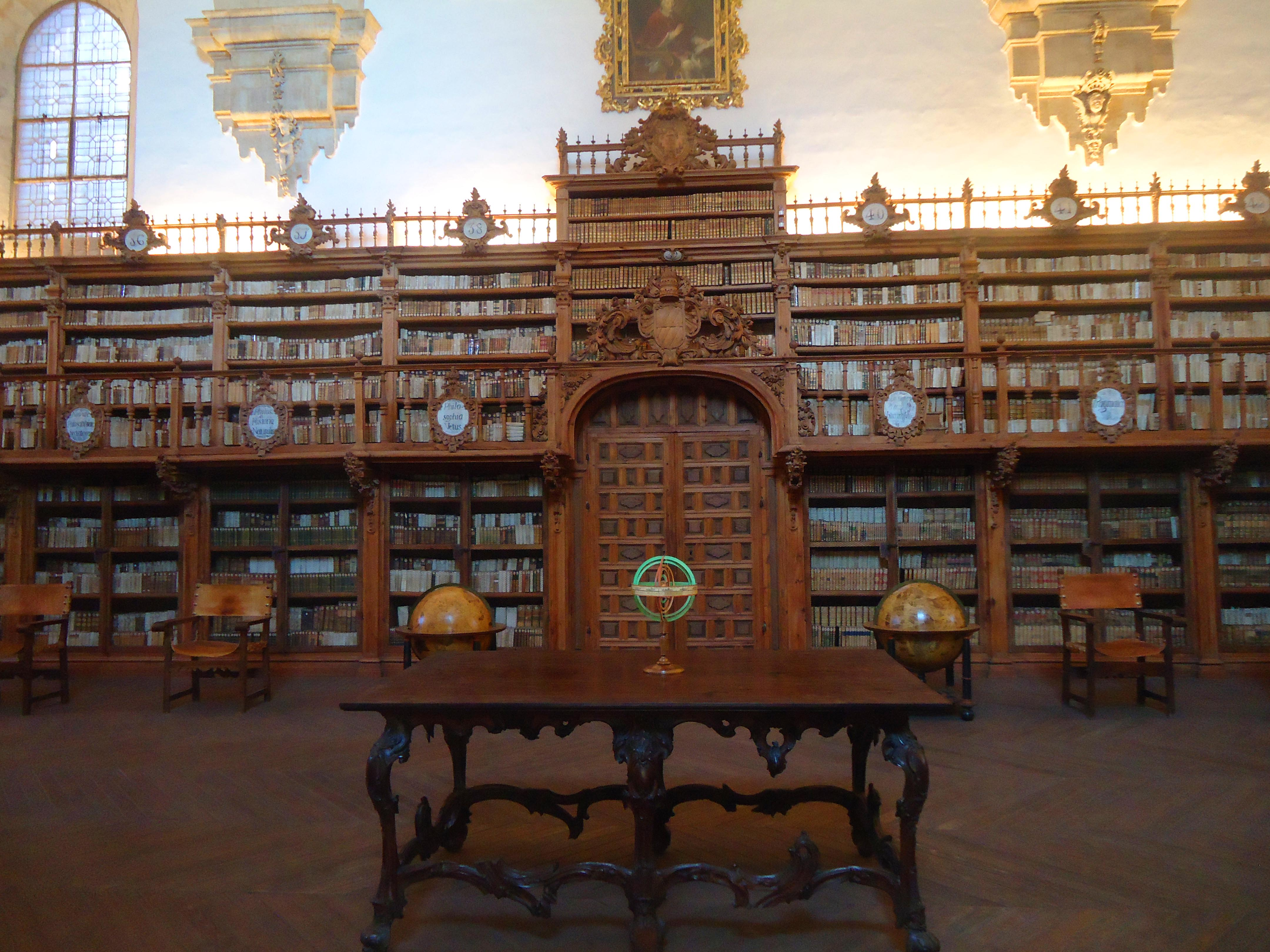
Biblioteca Antigua 2, Escuelas Mayores, University of Salamanca.

In the Modern Age, the first-born sons inherited their parents' wealth, so the children who followed them had to dedicate themselves to the arts, and so they entered colleges or universities. The lower nobility, made up of the hidalgos (people with noble titles but no money), also attended them. It was a time when university education gave people the opportunity to move up the social ladder and acquire prestige, since their services and knowledge were required by kings. The most important universities were those of Salamanca, Alcalá de Henares and Valladolid. The degrees studied were theology, jurisprudence and medicine. Latin and the liberal arts were also taught, which coexisted with the medieval scholastic tradition.

However, over the course of the 17th century, humanist ideas lost strength.

==== Society ====
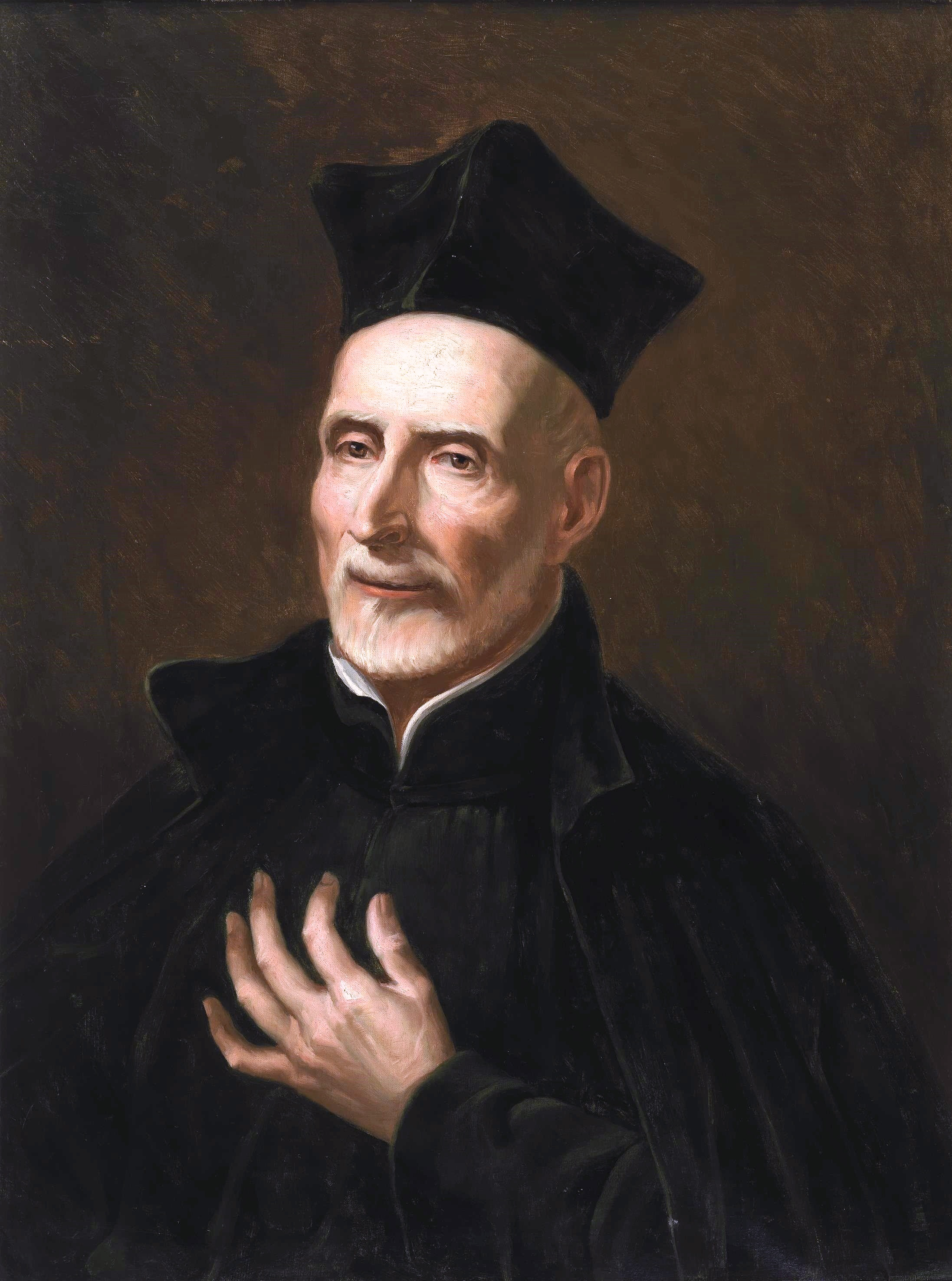
Portrait of Saint Joseph Calasanz (1557–1648), founder of the Pious Schools, who advocated the possibility of combating poverty and bringing about social change through the education of the poor.

From the Middle Ages in Spain, there was a concern to harness the talents of those with intelligence. In 1401, Bishop Diego de Anaya founded the Colegio Mayor de San Bartolomé in Salamanca for poor boys, providing them with a "scholarship" that included tuition, board and lodging. Other patrons created schools for the same purpose, including the Colegio de la Concepción de Huérfanos created by Francisco de Solís Quiñones y Montenegro, a doctor, bishop and personal secretary to Pope Paul III, himself an orphan, who was able to study thanks to the protection of a lady of the Maldonado family. Given the prestige of studying at these colleges, throughout the 17th century, they were occupied by students of higher rank, displacing their natural occupants, the poor.

As for the rest of the population, most of them were illiterate because their acquisition of knowledge was mainly by oral or visual transmission by the Catholic Church, through preaching, confession, spectacles and images. However, there were practices that allowed for an increase in the literacy of the Spanish population throughout the 16th century. The schools of first letters were promoted by religious orders and by municipalities, which provided the teaching of reading, writing, numbers and catechism. In the corporations, children and young people were accepted to serve the artisans in exchange for being taught reading, writing and a trade. On the other hand, there were also teachers (clerics or university students) who lived in the pupil's house.

Although it is considered that in the 17th century there was a stagnation in education due to disorganisation and lack of state administration, it was the century in which teachers began to receive a salary from the town council, their work and timetable were regulated and they began to use manuals and alphabets. At the same time, a teachers' corporation was formed in which admission was controlled and the interests defended by the corporation were not always oriented towards the benefit of the students. As for the children, there was no state plan for their education, so they attended the parishes, where the priests (who were not exclusively teachers, because they also carried out other activities) taught them to read, until they were gradually displaced by the Jesuits. The economic situation of many children forced them to leave school in order to work and support the family economy, although many of them received an education and learned to read in the corporations they joined.

==== Society of Jesus ====
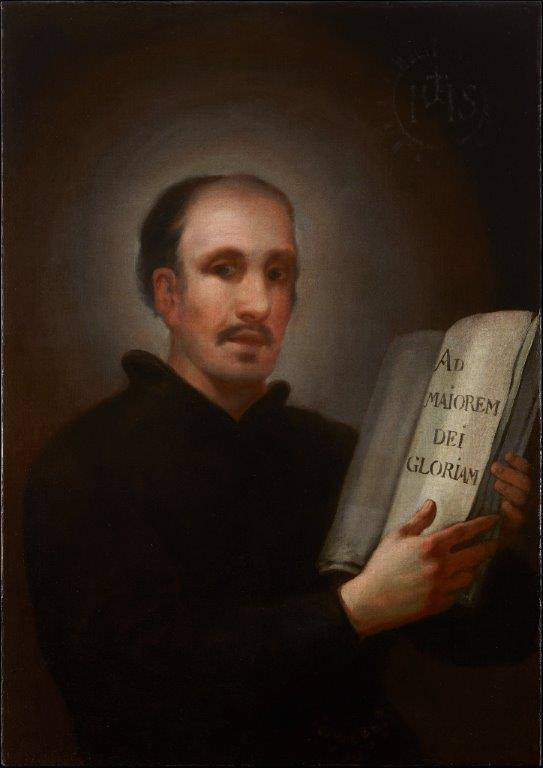
Saint Ignatius of Loyola.

A religious order founded by Ignatius of Loyola in 1534. Its activities began, with no intention of teaching, as residences for young people attending university. They began to teach theology and philosophy gradually and informally, with a humanist tendency. The College of Gandía was the first of the order, from its foundation, to be a residence, to give classes and to admit external students; from then on and throughout the 16th century, colleges began to be founded for this purpose. Its theology and philosophy courses were attended by the children of wealthy families, but because the classes were free, humble young people also attended to learn to read.

==== Piarists ====
The Order of the Pious Schools (Piarists), founded by Saint Joseph Calasanz (1557–1648), an Aragonese priest and educator, introduced in 17th century Catholic Europe (Italy, Austria, Poland, Slovakia...) and later in Spain, the free popular school open to all, especially the poorest. The first foundations of the Piarists were in Barbastro (1677), Benabarre (1681) and Moyá (1683). In the 18th century, 12 schools were founded in Spain. But the demand for schooling made to the Pious Schools during this 18th century was overwhelming. There are documented more than a hundred requests for the foundation of Piarist schools that were not met due to lack of Piarist personnel or because the governments of the time did not authorise them. The pedagogical style of Calasanz, who created his first school in Rome in 1597, sought the primary attention to the poorest, the efficiency, the innovation, the graduation of teaching and the synthesis between "Piety and Letters", his motto would be translated today as "Culture and Faith". After him, hundreds of male and female religious congregations appeared in the Catholic Church and in Spain, especially dedicated to education: La Salle, Marists, Salesians....

=== Illustration ===
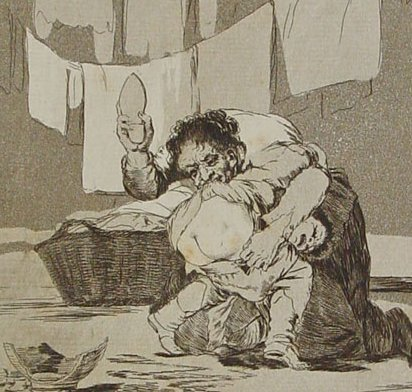
25.-"Yes, He Broke the Pot", drawing by Francisco de Goya from the series Los Caprichos. In this print, Goya criticised violence in the education of children. The Enlightenment believed that education could correct human faults and errors.

The arrival of the Bourbons to the crown of the Spanish Monarchy brought with it enlightened policies, but these had little effect on education throughout the 18th century. Until the government of Charles III there were no educational reforms. His policy consisted mainly of the expulsion of the Jesuits, the reform of universities and colleges and the secularisation of education. The novatores were a group of thinkers and scientists in the late 17th and early 18th centuries whose ideas influenced philosophy and science, which preceded the Enlightenment.

==== First Letters ====
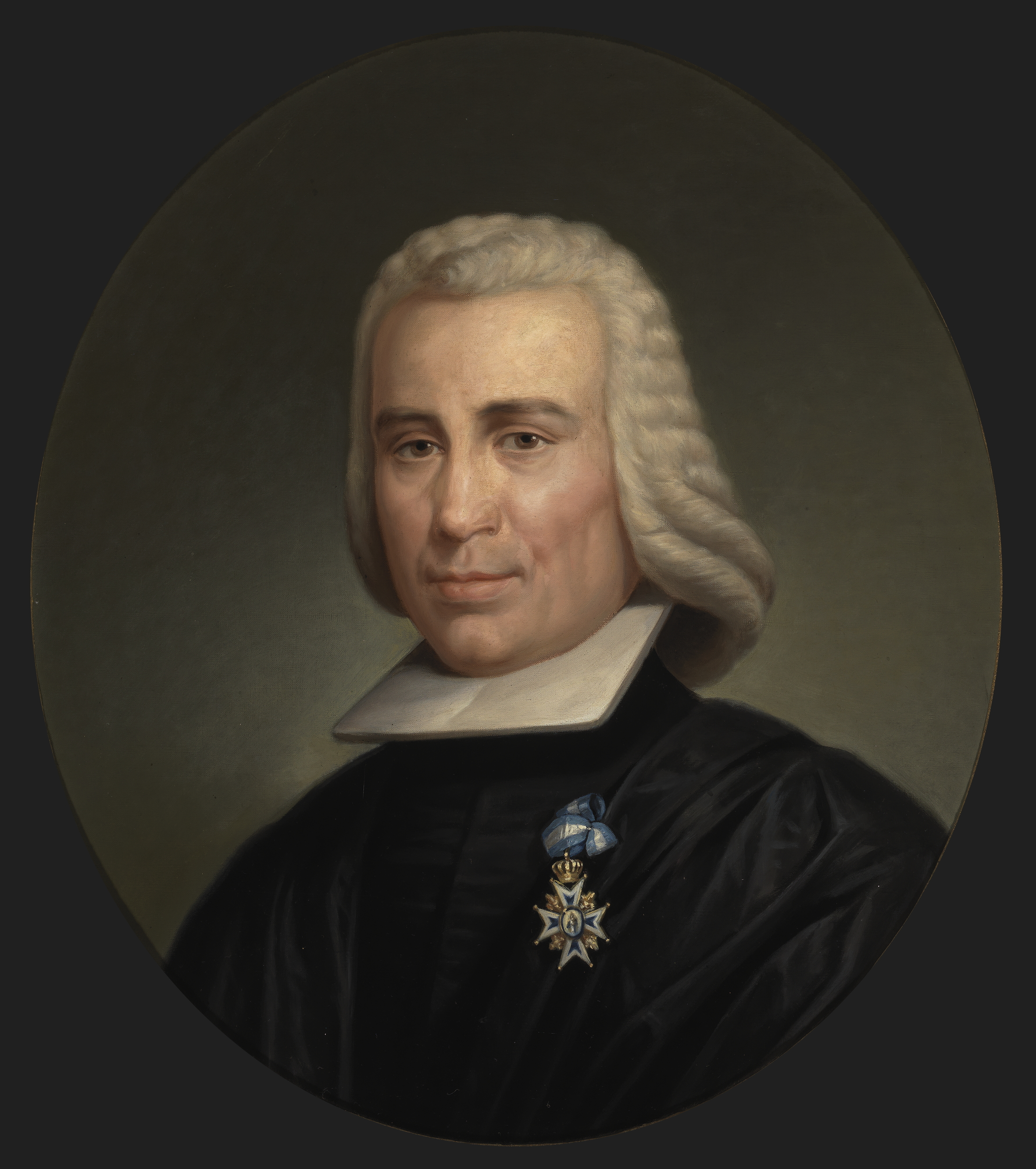
Pedro Rodríguez de Campomanes, Count of Campomanes (Museo del Prado).

When the 18th century realised that illiteracy was evident and detrimental to development, the state took measures to prepare teachers and schools. In 1780, the Colegio Académico del Noble Arte de Primeras Letras was created to prepare teachers. At the same time, texts, speeches and study plans were written by figures such as Pedro Rodríguez de Campomanes, José de Olavide y Jaúregui and Gaspar Melchor de Jovellanos, who spoke about progress, forms of instruction, methods, teaching and education focused on students and denounced the ineffectiveness of public schools and the education system. Juan Picornell rescues a quote that highlights the importance of the State taking care of education:

...if by chance the Republic is increased, it can be said that it grows in men, but not in strength. No State, then, will ever be wise, rich or powerful without education.

==== University ====
Spanish universities remained on the fringes of philosophical and scientific changes, which resulted in their backwardness in science studies and curricula because they were considered contrary to Catholic doctrine and their traditional, medieval scholastic method. They were considered obsolete because it was believed that their ceremonies and discussions corresponded little to Spanish reality and because of the corruption and complexity of their administration. For this reason, the crown carried out a university reform through the creation of the Plan of Studies of the University of Salamanca in 1771, which contained administrative and academic modifications. However, the reforms were not as successful as expected because the university students resisted the modification of their political and social practices. Moreover, the professors did not have the necessary preparation to comply with the new plan.

After the expulsion of the Jesuits in 1767, the Reales Estudios de San Isidro de Madrid were founded, dedicated to secondary education, whose teachers would be chosen by competition instead of by the religious orders. In these, Fine Arts, Mathematics, Physics, Natural and Human Law, Greek and Hebrew were taught. The Plan of 1771, also known as the Plan of Aranda, was created to regulate university education. In primary education, an attempt was made to fill the vacuum left by the Jesuits with public schools that taught First Letters, Latin and Rhetoric. The Seminary of Nobles in Madrid (1725), the College of Medicine and Surgery in Cadiz (1748), the Naval Observatory (1753), the Royal Academy of the Three Noble Arts (1757) and the Royal College of Surgery (1760) were also founded.

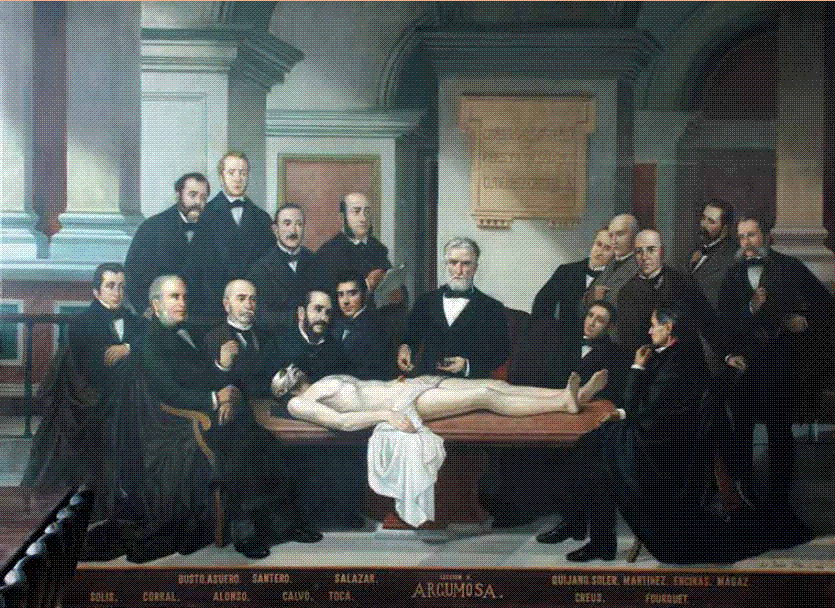
Lecture by Diego de Argumosa at the Royal College of Surgery, Antonio Bravo (1880).

== Contemporary Age ==
=== Cortes of Cadiz ===
The Constitution of 1812 devoted the six articles of Title IX to "public instruction", including the article on freedom of the press. It provides for the establishment of "schools of first letters" throughout the territory, as well as "other establishments of instruction", and a "competent number of universities". It retained the power of the Cortes to enact "special plans and statutes", entrusting the Government with the "inspection of public education" through a "general directorate of studies". The simple curriculum established for primary schools ("to read, write and count, and the catechism of the Catholic religion") is transcendental for the political objective of creating an electoral body of citizens, to which a deadline is set: although for the moment elections were held by universal suffrage (male and indirect), according to Article 25 "From the year one thousand eight hundred and thirty, those who once again enter into the exercise of the rights of citizens must know how to read and write". The influence of Condorcet' s writings and the French revolutionary constitutions of 1791, 1793 and 1795 on the Cádiz text has been pointed out, with the exception of what concerns the universities.

In the same year, 1812, a Board of Public Instruction was set up and commissioned to report on the general reform of national education. In 1813, the poet and politician Manuel José Quintana drafted the so-called Quintana Report, which was subsequently transformed into law during the Liberal Triennium.

=== Ferdinand VII ===
The return of Ferdinand VII produced an absolutist reaction which, among other consequences, meant that the Catholic Church was given the preponderant role in education that it had previously enjoyed and a return to the 1771 plan. For the universities, a new Board of Public Instruction was created to draw up a programme more in line with the principles of absolutism.

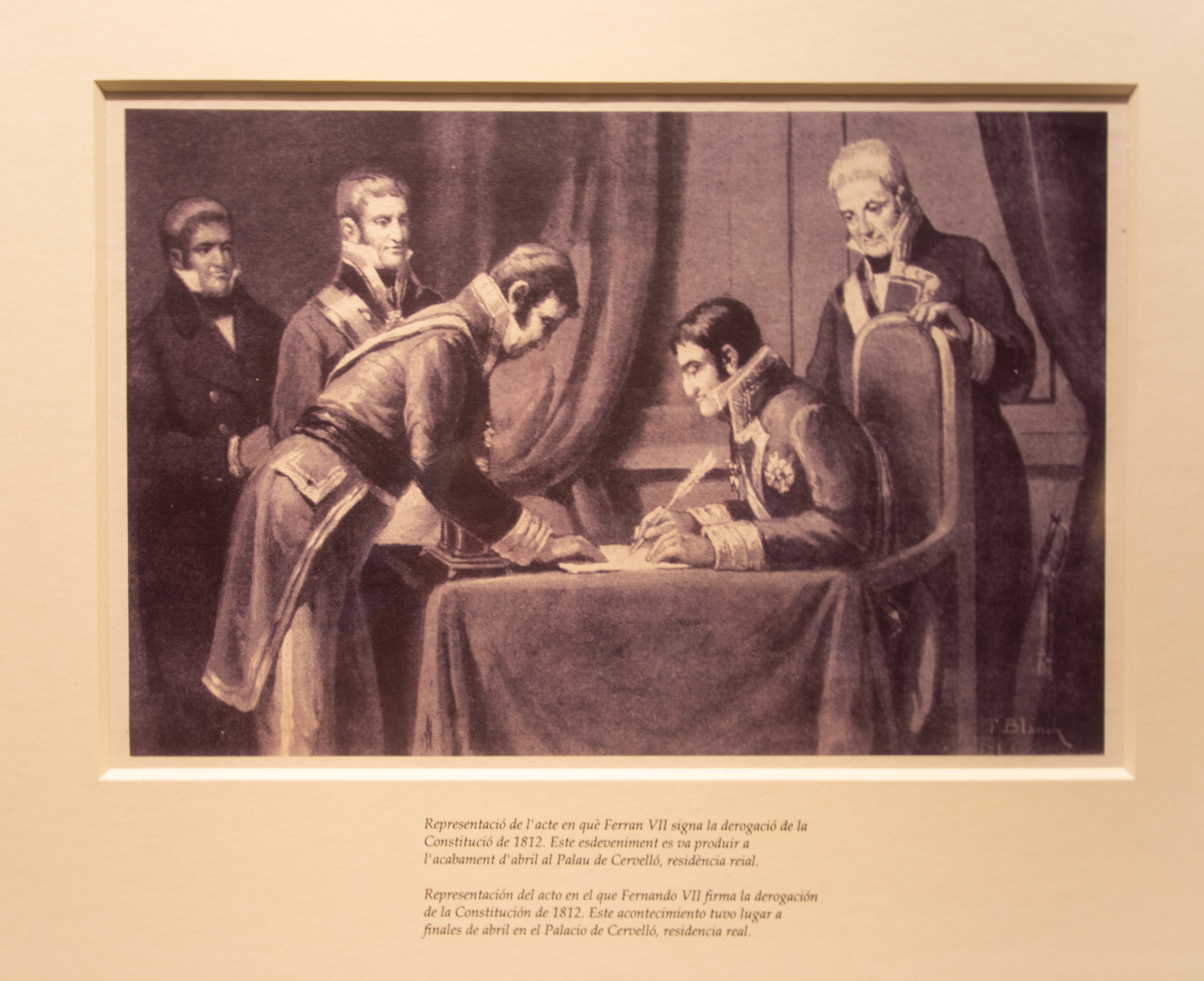
Abrogation of the 1812 Constitution by Ferdinand VII. The return to absolutism during the reign of this monarch meant backwardness and isolation in terms of education.

During the second absolutist restoration in Spain (1823–1833), private education (understood to be secular, since that of the religious orders was never considered private) was suppressed because it "mocks the zeal of authority and poisons the youth" ―it was also reproached that French and English were taught in its schools because all that could be read in those languages were impiety and obscenities aimed at "provoking the most unbridled lasciviousness"―. As for the university, the professors were purged ―in Santiago some thirty were "impurified", in Valencia half of them― and the teaching was "re-Christianised" and regulated by the "Calomarde plan", named after the Secretary of the Office of Grace and Justice, Francisco Tadeo Calomarde, in whose elaboration notable religious and lay people had participated. The study of modern science, of "the Cartesios and Neutones", was eliminated because, as the professors of the University of Cervera stated, "far from us the dangerous novelty of discourse" ―"it has set us back a century", a student from La Laguna would say―. Students enrolling for the first time had to present a certificate of "good political and religious conduct" signed by their parish priest and the civil authority, and to receive an academic degree they had to swear an oath to defend the sovereignty of the king, the doctrine of the Council of Constance on regicide and the Immaculate Conception. At the University of La Laguna there was a "tribunal of censorship" that monitored the conduct of the students.

Primary education was regulated by the Plan and general regulations of 16 February 1825, also the work of Calomarde and his ecclesiastical advisors. In the primary schools, boys were to be taught Christian doctrine, reading and writing, spelling and elementary arithmetic, but girls were to be taught only Christian doctrine and "to read, at least in the catechisms, and to write moderately" and above all they were to be taught "the work proper to their sex, namely: knitting, cutting and sewing common clothes, embroidery and lace making". In addition, the devotions they were to perform were established, such as "Blessed and praised be" when entering and leaving and praying the rosary every day. Teachers were required to provide "information on the cleanliness of their blood".

To avoid revolutionary disorders, the universities were closed on 12 October 1830, and the closure was extended for the following academic year, not being allowed to open again until 18 October 1832. Paradoxically, in the same year, 1830, the Bullfighting School in Seville had opened.

=== Isabella II ===
The universities, like society, did not find peace in the turbulent 19th century, because economic and political conditions failed to stabilise. Successive governments issued different educational legislation. The Moderate Decade (1844–1854) was characterised by continuous reforms to the Pidal Plan. In 1850, a Royal Decree of 28 August 1850 referred for the first time to District Universities. In 1851 it was ordered that the universities should report monthly to the Directorate General of Public Instruction. In 1852 and 1853 other partial reforms were made.

The plans to found a Central University in Madrid, which had begun during the Liberal Triennium, did not materialise until 1836, when the studies of the Complutense University of Alcalá de Henares were transferred to the capital.

==== Pidal Plan of 1845 ====
Promoted by the Minister of the Interior, Pedro José Pidal, it was drafted mainly by Antonio Gil de Zárate, whose pedagogical principles have been summarised as "freedom, gratuity, centralisation, inspection and uniformity". It had little significance; and being a simple ministerial-level decree, it could be subject to modification and repeal, which occurred in 1847 and 1850.

==== Concordat of 1851 ====
Article 2 of the Concordat of 1851 stated that "instruction in universities, colleges, seminaries and public and public schools of all kinds shall be in conformity with the doctrine of the Catholic religion itself".

==== Moyano Law of 1857 ====
The first comprehensive and rational educational law in Spain was the Public Instruction Law of 1857, known as the Moyano Law. It attempted to solve the serious problem of illiteracy the country was suffering from.

When the Progressives came to power (Progressive Biennium, 1854–1856), it was already clear that there was a need for a law with the status of a law to regulate the complex web of national education. Progressives and moderates now converged on the issue of education, agreeing on the broad outlines of the liberal educational system. Although the ideological division would reappear later with the alternating parties of Cánovas and Sagasta, it seems that by this time the differences between them were not so great as far as education was concerned. This explains why a good part of Alonso Martínez' s project ― the only thing that made time in the Progressive Biennium― was incorporated into the Public Instruction Law of 9 September 1857, known as the Moyano Law.

Thus, the moderates managed to consolidate the liberal education system by means of a law with a vocation for permanence ―the law would remain in force for more than a hundred years―. Its architect, Claudio Moyano, would resort to the formulation of a basic law which, by setting out the fundamental principles of the system, would thus avoid parliamentary debate on delicate and complex issues. Although this approach had previously been adopted by other ministers without achieving positive results, the political moment was now right for a speedy procedure and a successful achievement of the proposed objectives. Moreover, there were two fundamental reasons for obtaining the approval of the Cortes:

1. The need for a general law establishing the education system built up over almost fifty years.
2. The existence of a fairly broad consensus on the educational institutions that the different regulations had been implementing.

For all these reasons, it can be said that the Moyano Law was not an innovative law, but rather a regulation that enshrined an educational system whose fundamental bases were already to be found in the Regulations of 1821, in the Plan of the Duke of Rivas of 1836 and in the Pidal Plan of 1845.

This can be seen not only in the organisation of education into three grades but also in the regulation of each academic level. Thus, in primary education, the traditional criterion of the existence of two stages of education ―elementary and higher― is taken up, and the principle of relative gratuity is also established ―only for children whose parents could not pay for it― as well as the criteria already known about its financing, the selection of teachers and the regulation of teacher training colleges. With regard to secondary education, which now acquires its own substance and full autonomy from higher education, the division into two types of studies ―general and applied―, the definitive establishment of the institutes and their financing from the provincial budgets are established. Finally, university education was regulated by means of the well-known distinction between Faculty Studies, Technical Education and Professional Education, reaffirming the principle of the Pidal Plan that only studies carried out in public establishments would be academically valid.

With the Moyano Law, therefore, the great principles of historical moderantism were definitively implemented:

- relative gratuity for primary education (5)
- centralisation
- uniformity
- secularization and
- limited freedom of education.

With regard to the requirements for obtaining authorisation for private schools, the law maintains the criterion of graduating the requirements. Thus, for primary education, it is sufficient to be twenty years old and hold a teacher's qualification; for secondary education, on the other hand, the requirements are increased, with the need for the teaching staff to hold the corresponding qualification, a deposit to be made and the internal regulations of the establishment to be subject to the provisions dictated by the Government. If, on the other hand, the public school wished to obtain the benefit of incorporation, that is to say, the academic validity of the studies taken, the requirements would be greater, with special emphasis on the qualification ―the one required for Institute Professors― subject to the same programmes as in public centres and annual examination in the Institutes to which the schools are incorporated (art. 51).

Understandably, the main feature of this Law was the absolute and direct control of the institutions established in Madrid, with the central government owning and managing them through the Royal Council of Public Instruction. It is also understandable that within its characteristics, the uniformity for which the Government was betting on when it came to implementing this Law, being secular, free during the first stage of education and being paid in the second stage.

What cannot be avoided is the biased nature of that law with regard to women, as they occupied a passive role in which their education was not common, so that exclusive means were used for women, creating specific subjects for women in education, with the teaching profession as the only qualification suitable for women.

The structure of the education system was basically as follows;

- First Education, provided in schools and free of charge.
- Secondary Education, taught in secondary schools, which gave the right to take examinations to obtain the degree of Bachelor of Arts (essential to begin optional education and recommended to opt for higher education).
- Faculty Studies (initially Philosophy, Law, Science, Medicine, Pharmacy and Theology), which were taught in Universities, gave access to the degree of Bachelor, Licentiate of Science and, if continued, Doctor;
- Higher Education, taught in the Higher Schools for degrees in engineering, Fine Arts (Architecture, Painting and Sculpture, Music...), Diplomacy and Notary;
- Professional Education, which was taught in specific centres for the degrees of Primary School Teacher, Veterinarian, Commercial Teacher, Nautical Teacher, and Master Builder/Surveyor/Surveyor.

==== University protests and the Night of St. Daniel (1865) ====
The last years of the reign of Isabella II were characterised by an increase in political repression, especially at the university level. The government demanded that the rector of the Central University, Juan Manuel Montalbán, dismiss Professor of History Emilio Castelar. When the rector refused, the Minister of Public Works, Antonio Alcalá Galiano, dismissed Montalbán and stripped Castelar of his professorship. Several professors (among them Nicolás Salmerón and Miguel Morayta) resigned out of solidarity, and student protests were organised, which were harshly repressed on the so-called Night of St. Daniel (10 April 1865), causing fourteen deaths and one hundred and ninety-three injured.

=== Democratic Sexennium ===
After the Revolution of 1868, the "Manifesto" of the provisional government (25 October 1868) dealt extensively with education, particularly academic freedom. In the Decree of 21 October 1868, it was developed legislatively. It was intended to deprive the State of its ability to organise teaching methods, textbooks and curricula, which became the responsibility of teachers. Both public and private schools were to submit pupils to the same examinations in the same courts. The Decree of 25 October 1868 reorganised secondary education, reducing the weight of Latin and increasing that of the Castilian language, and introducing subjects such as psychology, art, Spanish history, fundamental principles of law, agriculture and commerce. Article 24 of the 1869 Constitution established the most absolute freedom to found and manage educational establishments, the only function of the inspectorate being to control "hygiene" and "morality".

=== Restoration ===
==== Orovio's Circular and the Institución Libre de Enseñanza ====
Just at the beginning of the Restoration, the Minister of Public Works, the Marquis of Orovio, imposed an ideological purge on the teaching staff by means of the so-called "Orovio Circular" (1875), which obliged teachers to swear an oath not to teach doctrines contrary to Catholicism. This was refused by the most prominent Krausists, who left the university and founded the Institución Libre de Enseñanza (1876), a transcendental pedagogical reform movement headed by Francisco Giner de los Ríos.

==== Decrees of Romanones ====
Formulated on 17 August 1901, this Decree organised Secondary Education in Spain under the prism of modernity, developing a project of curricular agglutination through "General and Technical Institutes", destined to become macro centres of Secondary Education with at least seven possible academic offerings. An ambitious project of seven subjects per year and a basic revalidation for the awarding of the degree, which failed because it was provocative in the face of complaints from the press, families, politicians and teachers of the time.

===== 1901 Secondary Education Decree =====
In August 1901, the Minister of Public Instruction, Count de Romanones, issued a Royal Decree that reformed the de facto Secondary Education system. Its introduction states that "the arduous problem of national education cannot be solved with partial reforms". The Decree came to change the Spanish education system from top to bottom.

Article 1 renamed the Provincial Institutes of Secondary Education as General and Technical Institutes, and established their teachings:

- 1.° General studies of the degree of Bachelor.
- 2.° Elementary and higher studies of the Magisterio de Primera Enseñanza.
- 3.° Elementary studies in agriculture.
- 4.° Elementary studies in Industry.
- 5.° Elementary studies in commerce.
- 6.° Elementary studies in Fine Arts.
- 7.° Evening classes for workers.

Article 2 established the curriculum for obtaining the bachelor's degree. Divided into six years, students would study seven subjects per year, except in the 3rd and 6th years, when they would have to pass eight subjects. Article 3 stipulated that classes were to last one hour, and at most one and a half hours. The cloisters were responsible for determining the general timetable of the school. Article 4 limited the number of pupils per class to 150. If the number of pupils exceeded this figure, the classes would be divided into two sections and would be taught by the same professor, who would count the class hours as double. When the number of students exceeded 300, there would be two sections under the responsibility of the professor and one under the responsibility of the corresponding assistant. The professor who had to explain for more than eighteen hours a week would receive, by reason of accumulation, a bonus of 1000 pesetas.

Article 5 established that all subjects in this plan were compulsory in order to obtain the degree of Bachelor, except for Religion, in which it was optional to enrol, and the fourth, fifth and sixth years of Drawing, which only students who had obtained a certificate of aptitude to continue their studies from the teacher (hence the catchphrase of the two Marías) had to attend. Article 6 stipulated that the examinations for the course test and the exercises for the degree would be carried out in strict compliance with the provisions of the examination regulations of 10 May 1901.

Article 7 prohibited the charging of examination fees by the professors and teachers of the Institutes. The payment of these fees was to be made on State payment paper. To compensate for this, the scale of professors was created in the following way:

- 50 full professors, at 8,000 pesetas.
- 50 ídem for fourth promotion, at 7,500 pesetas.
- 50 ídem for third promotion, at 7.000 pesetas.
- 100 ídem for second promotion, at 6,000 pesetas.
- 100 ídem for first promotion, at 5,000 pesetas.
- The rest of the entrance fee, at 4,000 pesetas.

The professors of the Institutes of Madrid will also enjoy a salary increase of 1,000 pesetas for residence. Once this reform was implemented, a scale of special secondary school teachers was formed, which included French Language, English or German Language and Drawing, taking into account the amount of the salaries currently enjoyed, by reason of seniority, by existing teachers.

Articles 8 and 9 provided for the inspection of official and private schools and established that the Government could provisionally appoint inspectors in each university district with more than 5 years' experience in the teaching profession, or be or have been a Councillor for Public Instruction or University Professor, even if they had not served five years. The budget shall include a sum calculated to be sufficient for the payment of the allowances of the Inspectors.

Article 10 provided for the staffing of all the Institutes:

- 1 Professor of Latin.
- 1 Professor of Spanish Language and Literature, who would be the current Professor of Literary History and Preceptive.
- 1 Professor of Commercial and Statistical Geography and Cosmography.
- 1 of Arithmetic and Geometry.
- 1 of Algebra and Trigonometry.
- 1 of General Descriptive Geography of Europe and Spain, History of Spain and Universal History.
- 1 of Psychology, Logic, Ethics and Rudiments of Law.
- 1 of Physics and Chemistry.
- 1 of Natural History, Physiology and Hygiene.
- 1 of Agriculture and Agricultural and Industrial Technique.
- 1 of French Language.
- 1 of English or German Language.
- 1 teacher of Geometrical and Artistic Drawing and Gymnastics and 1 teacher of Calligraphy in the Provincial Institutes.
- 1 Chaplain.
- 1 numerary assistant of Letters.
- 1 idem id. for Science.
- 1 idem id. for Languages.
- 2 idem id. for Drawing.
  - In the Institutes of Madrid, there would be two Assistants of Letters and two of Sciences.
- 1 Teacher of Pedagogy and School Law in the Provincial Institutes.
- 1 Assistant Teacher in the Provincial Institutes.
- 1 Teacher of Topography and Surveying in the Provincial Institutes.
- 1 Teacher of Construction, Mechanics and Electrical Engineering in the Provincial Institutes.
- 1 Teacher of Arithmetic, Commercial Calculations and Bookkeeping in the Institutes where Commerce Studies are offered.
- 1 Teacher of Figure, Ornamental and Architectural Drawing and Decorative Composition, where there are elementary studies in Fine Arts.
- 1 Teacher of Modelling and Casting in Provincial Institutes.
- 1 Workshop teacher in the provincial institutes.
- 1 Workshop assistant in the provincial institutes.

===== 1901 First Education Decree =====
There was a presentation with a reflection on the importance of the decree:

I offered as an example worthy of imitation the conduct of those Crown Councillors who, by their persistence in determining as the only possible solution to the problem of primary education the solution proposed today, as shown by the Royal Decree of 30 April 1886, countersigned by Mr. Montero Ríos, and the Royal Decree of 7 December 1888, countersigned by Mr. Canalejas, left the direction that the liberal party was to follow regarding the payment by the State of the teachers' salaries.

This feeling was corroborated by the unanimous opinion of all those in Spain who are dedicated to this teaching function, and in response to the urgent demands of public opinion, this reform was born in the heat of a national aspiration, which could not be ignored with reprehensible indifference, nor should it be disregarded with punishable neglect.

It is not for the undersigned Minister to judge what his own work may deserve; but it must be lawful for him on the present occasion to declare with all sincerity that he has never believed that he has better fulfilled the duties of his office, his duties to the Nation and his duties to Your Majesty, than at the present moment, by submitting the following draft decree to your Royal sanction.

Count of Romanones.

==== Board for the Extension of Studies and the Student Residence ====
Within the regenerationist cultural environment, the Board for the Extension of Studies and Scientific Research (Junta para Ampliación de Estudios e Investigaciones Científicas) was created in 1907, and in 1910 the Student Residence (Residencia de Estudiantes) was established within it.

=== Second Republic ===
The first educational measures promoted by the Second Republic were:

- Bilingualism: defended or demanded from Catalonia. It was expressed in a Decree of 1931 in which the existence of different languages was recognised. The Decree states that, in the case of Catalan, teaching will be in the mother tongue up to the age of 8 at school, either Spanish or Catalan.
- Reorganisation of the Council of Public Instruction, whose president was Miguel de Unamuno (rector).
- Religious education: this issue will take shape with the publication of a decree on religious congregations and confessions. This decree regulates and abolishes the compulsory teaching of religion, based on religious freedom and freedom of conscience for children and teachers.
- Creation of the Pedagogical Missions. This was a continuation of the idea of the ILE called "university extension" and the aim was to extend general culture or teaching modernisation, education in villages, towns and places that needed it, fundamentally in rural areas, and civic education.
- Attention to primary school, as it was thought to be the cornerstone of education. They proposed the construction of 27,000 schools (the most important challenge) to provide schooling for the one million children who did not attend school, as there were none at the time. This was to be done through a "five-year plan", whereby 7,000 schools would be built in the first year and 5,000 schools in each of the following four years.

The problem was that they needed financing, about 400 million pesetas through public debt. At this that there was an economic recession (the crash of '29). In the end, the schools that were planned were not built.

An attempt was made to endow an educational law in accordance with the thinking of the Second Republic, and Lorenzo Luzuriaga was the one who drew up the document with the following basic principles:

- Public education should be an essential function of the State. However, it could be delegated to the region, to the municipality... provided that these entities could justify their economic and cultural solvency. The existence of private education is accepted as long as it does not pursue political or partisan ends.
- Public education must be secular. Schools should only provide information on the history of religions as another subject, with special reference to the Catholic religion. If parents request it, the State should provide the means to provide this religious education, but always outside the school.
- Education should be free of charge, especially at primary level. For the university, 25% free tuition should be reserved.
- Education must have an active and creative character, also on a permanent basis, by providing further training courses for teachers.
- Public education should have a social character, the school should be integrated into society and therefore, there should be a greater connection between parents and the educational community.
- They defend coeducation, i.e. the non-separation of the sexes or, in other words, mixed education, where boys and girls should be educated together according to the same curriculum, and this idea would be applicable to all levels of education.
- Public education is a unitary whole, made up of three levels with communication between them:
  - Primary. It would have two modalities: voluntary (4–6 years) and basic (6–12 years).
  - Secondary. It would consist of two cycles: extension of primary education (12–15 years) and preparation for university courses (15–18 years).
  - Higher or university level
- Teachers. Teachers need to be convinced of the pedagogical programme so that it does not fail, and so teachers need to be adequately prepared and aware of it.

During the Second Republic there were two distinct periods: the progressive biennium (1931–1933) and the conservative biennium (1934–1936).

==== First Biennium (1931-1933) ====
During the progressive biennium, profound educational transformations took place. In 1931, adult education was regulated by the Decree of the Patronage of Pedagogical Missions (Decreto de Patronato de Misiones Pedagógicas), which was a precedent for socio-cultural animation. The target groups were the most remote, neglected or depressed areas of Spain. They had an educational and cultural focus, but not an instructive one, as the aim was to stimulate motivation and cultural enjoyment rather than to emphasise content or literacy in the strict sense of the term. Their aim was to disseminate general culture, educational guidance and citizenship education in villages, towns and places with a special focus on the rural population. The activities carried out were varied and served a variety of purposes:

- Cultural: popular libraries, public readings, conferences on various topics (health, agriculture), cinema sessions, etc.
- Social: meetings with those responsible for the missions, conferences on political issues, etc.
- Socio-educational: activities directly connected with elements of formal and regulated education, such as refresher courses for teachers in the area, etc.

In 1932, the Pedagogy section was created in the Faculty of Philosophy and Letters at the University of Madrid. During the same year, the Decree on the Inspection of Primary Education (Decreto sobre la Inspección de la Primera Enseñanza) was approved, which formulated inspectors with a technical-pedagogical profile, as facilitators of learning who could and should guide teachers. This decree was a revolution. The General Inspectorate of Secondary Education (Inspección General de Segunda Enseñanza) was also created, following the same general guidelines as that of Primary Education. The Decree on the Immovability of Inspectors (Decreto de Inamovilidad de los Inspectores) was also approved, in order to avoid the interference of political power in their work. It allowed them to work with independence, autonomy and stability in the exercise of their profession and was considered a very important measure. At the same time, the Boards of Inspectors were created to facilitate coordination and communication between them.

In 1933, the Law on Religious Denominations and Congregations (Ley de Confesiones y Congregaciones Religiosas) was passed, which deprived the ecclesiastical establishment of teaching functions. To avoid the problems caused by their withdrawal, the Substitution Board (Junta de Sustituciones) was created, which meant that when a professor was unable to attend his classes, another teacher would take his place.

A minor reform of the university was approved, where, among other measures, students' complaints were noted and examinations in each subject were eliminated. The Santander International Summer University was created.

==== Second Biennium (1934–1936) ====
The 1933 elections give power to Gil Robles' CEDA coalition, a right-wing party. There was a shift in Republican policy which had a decisive influence on education and which became known as the "educational counter-reform":

- Decrease in the number of pupils
- Prohibition of coeducation in primary schools, which meant that boys and girls had to study separately.
- Abolition of the Central Inspectorate of Education, citing lack of money.
- Abolition of the Decree on the Immovability of Inspectors.
- At the university, student representation in governing bodies was abolished.

Filiberto Villalobos took up the creation of schools. He was also responsible for the creation of the seven baccalaureate courses.

=== Francoism ===
==== Law for the Reform of Secondary Education of 1938 ====
In the midst of the civil war, the Law for the Reform of Secondary Education (Ley de Reforma de la Enseñanza Media de 1938) was passed, promoted by the ministry of Pedro Sáinz Rodríguez.

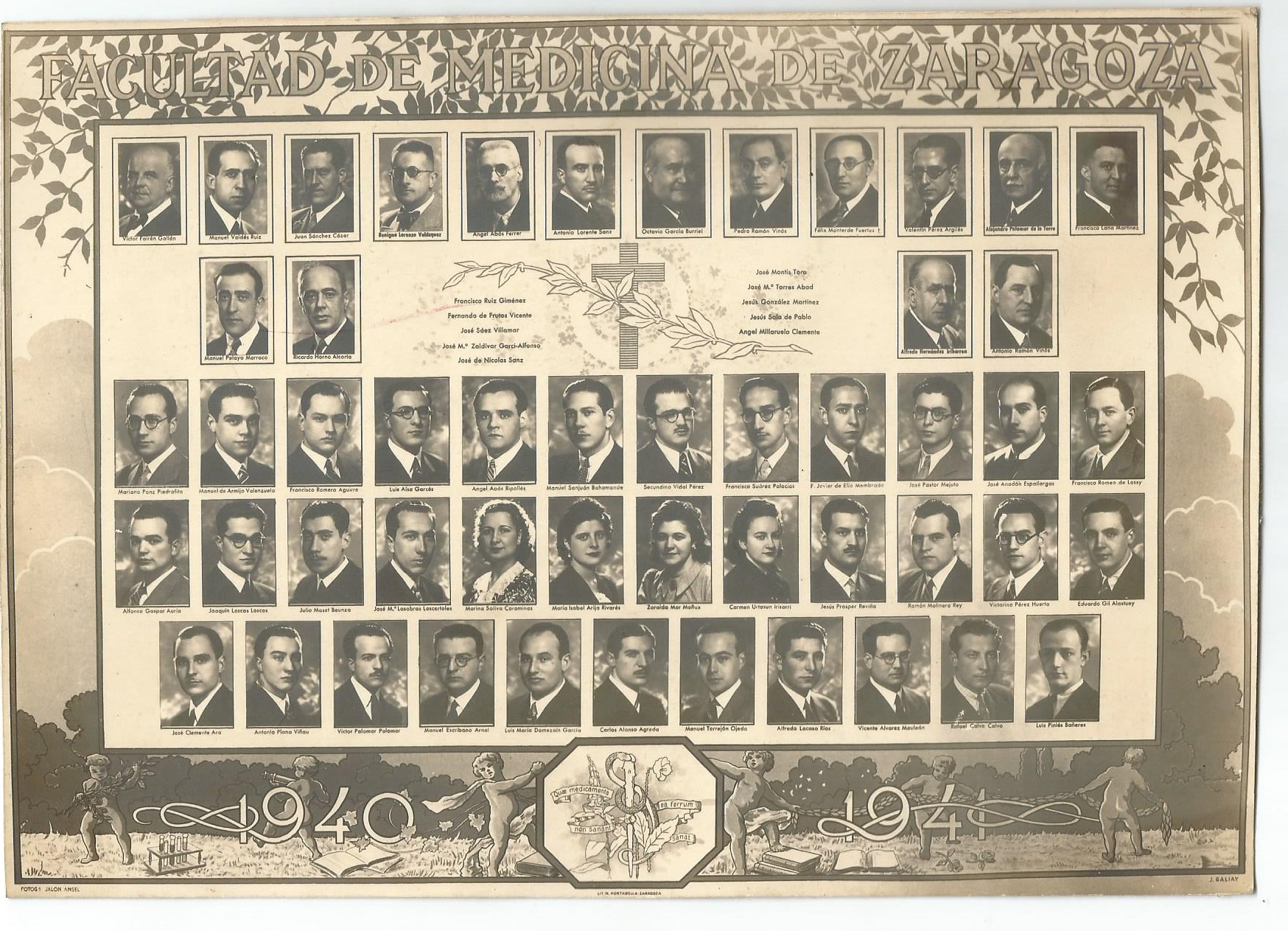
Orla of the 1940–1941 academic year at the Zaragoza medical school.

==== Law on the Organisation of the Spanish University of 1943. ====
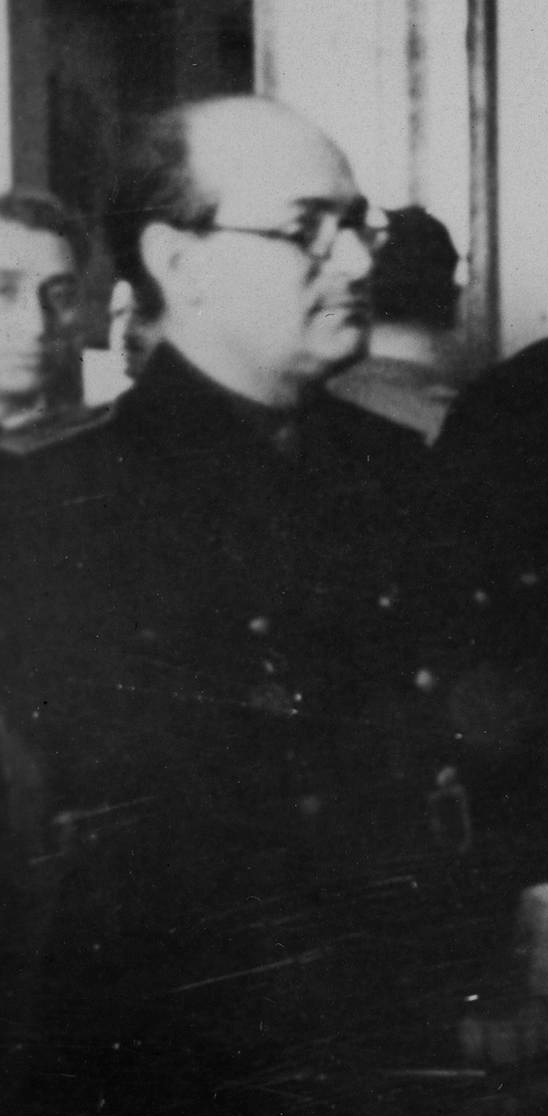
Photograph of José Ibáñez Martín (1944), who served as Minister of Education during Franco's regime and as the first president of the Spanish National Research Council (Consejo Superior de Investigaciones Científicas).

In the post-war period, the Law on the Organisation of Spanish Universities (Ley de Ordenación de la Universidad Española, July 29, 1943) was passed, promoted by the ministry of Pedro Sainz Rodríguez.

==== Law on Primary Education of 1945 ====
In the post-war period, following some debate the Law on Primary Education of 1945 was passed (Ley sobre Educación Primaria de 1945), promoted by the ministry of José Ibáñez Martín. This law only affected primary education and was supplemented, belatedly, by a Decree of 1967. It reflected the ideology of Franco's regime, considering education as a right of the family, the Church and the State, which meant that it was marked by national-Catholic thinking. Therefore, primary education had a confessional, patriotic, social, intellectual, physical and professional character. It was compulsory, free of charge, and the separation of the sexes, as well as the compulsory use of the Spanish language throughout the national territory.

Primary education ranged from six to twelve years of age and was provided in various types of schools: national, Church, patronage and private. The curriculum was centralised and organised in a cyclical manner, grouping knowledge into three types: instrumental, formative and complementary.

This law established the rights and duties of teachers and determined their training and the system for admission by competitive examination to the (Cuerpo del Magisterio Nacional Primario).

==== Law on the Organisation of Secondary Education of 1953 ====
The Law on the Organisation of Secondary Education of 1953 (Ley de Ordenación de la Enseñanza Media de 1953) was promoted during the ministry of Joaquín Ruiz Jiménez. This law, homologous to the previous one, regulated secondary education and was also reformed in 1967. It was a confessional and ideological law. Access to secondary education was by means of an entrance examination. The regulations established general and special baccalaureate programmes. The general baccalaureate consisted of a four-year elementary baccalaureate, a revalidation for access to the higher baccalaureate of two more years and another revalidation. In addition, there was a preparatory course for university, called Preuniversitario (PREU). The baccaulaurate of special plan, labour baccalaureate, consisted of five courses and two further revalida.

==== General Education Act of 1970 ====
The General Education Law of 1970 was promoted by the ministry of José Luis Villar Palasí, the true architect of the law.

The need for change in the 1970s was evident in Spain at the social, political and educational levels. A law covering the whole of the national education system was necessary. It was intended to provide the country with an education system that was fairer, more efficient and more in line with the needs of the Spanish people. The basic criteria for this law were unity, covering the different educational levels, interrelation between them, and flexibility.

The structure of the education system was established as follows:

- Nursery education, from two to four years of age. It was voluntary and was mainly provided in private schools and nursery schools.
- Pre-school education, from four to six years. It was voluntary and was provided in public and private schools by specialist pre-school teachers. The curriculum was limited to maturational aspects and preparation for instrumental subjects: pre-reading, pre-writing and pre-calculus.
- General Basic Education (Educación General Básica, EGB), from six to fourteen years of age. It was compulsory and free of charge. The eight grades were divided into two stages (First Stage for the first five grades and Second Stage for the remaining three) and three cycles.
  - The Initial Cycle, from six to eight years of age, comprised the first two years.
  - The Intermediate Cycle, from eight to eleven years of age, comprised the third, fourth and fifth years.
  - The Superior Cycle, from twelve to fourteen years of age, comprised the last three years.

Students could obtain one of two diplomas:

- High School Diploma (Graduado Escolar), when the objectives of the eight years of EGB were successfully passed. It allowed pupils to continue their studies in Baccalaurate or Vocational Training.
- Completion Certificate for Compulsory Education (Certificado de Escolaridad), which accredited having completed the eight years of schooling but did not provide information on their achievement. It only gave access to Vocational Training or to leaving the education system.

The internal structure of subjects was established in the New Pedagogical Orientations (Nuevas Orientaciones Pedagógicas, 1970). The teaching staff in this Law included the former Primary School Teachers homologated with those coming from the Reform which for the first time included them in the University with the rank of University Graduates and titles of teachers of Basic General Education.

- Unified Polyvalent Baccalaureate (Bachillerato Unificado Polivalente, BUP). It consisted of three courses, from fourteen to seventeen years of age. There were common subjects in the first year and a moderate diversification thereafter depending on the specialisation (arts, sciences, and a mixture of both). At the end of the course, if the pupils were successful, they were awarded the title of Bachelor. In order to enter university, it was necessary to take the University Orientation Course (Curso de Orientación Universitaria, COU), which began with the aim of guiding students in their choice of career and ended up being a fourth year of the Baccalaurate, intended, if possible, to pass the Selectividad exam.
- Professional Education (Formación Profesional), intended for students who did not obtain the High School Diploma (Graduado Escolar) or for those who were interested in a professional qualification for the world of work. It had two levels: First Grade Vocational Training, which lasted two years and at the end of which the title of Auxiliary Technician was obtained if the studies were passed (or the Completion Certificate for Compulsory Education if they did not passed); and Second Grade Vocational Training, which lasted three years and allowed the title of Specialist Technician to be obtained. Professional Education was provided by Professional Education Institutes.
- Schools of Applied Arts and Artistic Trades (Escuelas de Artes Aplicadas y Oficios Artísticos, AAyOA).
- Special Education was strongly boosted by this law, as was Adult Education and Distance Education, with the creation of CENEBAD (National Centre for Basic Distance Education), INBAD (National Institute for Distance Baccalaureate) and UNED (National University of Distance Education).
- Higher Education was provided at the Universities, which were accessed after completing the COU or FP2. It had three levels:
  - Diplomatura or first cycle, lasting three years. It was taken at the University Schools and it was not necessary to pass the Selectividad. At the end of the course, the Diploma was awarded.
  - Bachelor's Degree, Engineering or Architecture, of five years' duration. It was taken at the University Faculties after passing the Selectividad.
  - Doctorate, the highest university degree. It required the completion of certain credits spread over two years and ended with the presentation of the doctoral thesis.

The teaching model followed in this Law was technocratic, along behaviourist lines. In general terms, it followed a process-product approach to learning. The teacher model was consequently technical and competent, designing good programmes with clear and measurable objectives.

The General Education Act gave a strong boost to Spanish education by strengthening and unifying the education system and introducing curricular, organisational and technological innovations. Among the most progressive and advanced measures of the LGE are the following:

- It is the first time in Spain, after the Moyano Law, that a law is enacted to regulate the entire education system, from pre-school to university education.
- Creation of a common core, General Basic Education, lasting eight years.
- Introduction of Professional Formation in the ordinary education system and its connection with the university.
- Dignification and elevation of the teaching career to university status.
- Establishment of a scholarship system to achieve equal opportunities among students.
- Institutionalisation of school, personal and professional guidance.
- Achieved, for the first time, full schooling of Spaniards at compulsory levels, avoiding premature selection.
- Recommendation of active, individual, original and creative methods.
- Introduction of the concept of continuous assessment.

=== Democracy ===
==== Constitution of 1978 ====
Article 27 of the Constitution was devoted to the right to education and freedom of education, establishing compulsory and free basic education and university autonomy, as well as the general programming of education and educational inspection by the public authorities. It allows for the creation of educational establishments both by private initiative and by the public authorities (properly speaking, by the autonomous communities, given that it is they who will acquire competences in education); providing that both can receive public funding, which results in the establishment of three types of establishments: public, subsidised and private.

Religious education, as well as the course of religion, were guaranteed both in the constitutional text (through the expression "the right of parents for their children to receive the religious and moral education that is in accordance with their own convictions") and in the 1979 Agreements between the Spanish State and the Holy See, which were being negotiated at the same time. In practice, the confessional subject of "Catholic Religion", which had been compulsory since the Franco regime, became an optional subject for students (who can substitute it for another subject called "Ethics", which was subsequently treated differently) and which schools must offer as compulsory, taught by teachers appointed by the ecclesiastical authorities and paid for by the public authorities.

==== Organic Law regulating the Statute of Educational Establishments (LOECE) 1980 ====
The Ley Orgánica por la que se regula el Estatuto de Centros Escolares (LOECE) 1980, promoted by the ministry of José Manuel Otero (UCD government). It was appealed before the Constitutional Court, which partially upheld the appeal, eliminating several points of the law.

==== Law on University Act (LRU) 1983 ====
The University Reform Law, promoted by the ministry of José María Maravall (PSOE government) was the first renewal of legislation in this field since the Franco regime, since the Organic Law of University Autonomy (LAU), passed between 1980 and 1982 (UCD governments) was never approved.

==== Organic Law regulating the Right to Education (LODE) of July 3, 1985 ====
Promoted by the ministry of José María Maravall (PSOE government). Known by its acronym LODE (Ley Orgánica reguladora de Derecho a la Educación de 3 de julio de 1985), it is not a law that affects the structure of the educational system, but rather regulates the duality of educational centres, the participation of the educational community in teaching, the right to education and determines democratic management, as opposed to the previous technocratic one. Its more specific development in the aforementioned areas is contained in Royal Decree 2376/1985. This Decree has been partially modified by the Organic Regulations of Infant and Primary Schools and Secondary Schools and by the Order of 29 June 1994 approving the instructions regulating the organisation and operation of Infant and Primary Schools. It has been almost entirely reformed by the LOPEG (Organic Law 9/1995 of 20 November 1995) on the evaluation, participation and governance of schools.

==== Organic Law on the General Organisation of the Spanish Education System (LOGSE) of 1990 ====
Promoted by the ministry of Javier Solana Madariaga (PSOE government), the Organic Law on the General Organisation of the Spanish Education System of 1990 (Ley Orgánica de Ordenación General del Sistema Educativo de España de 1990, LOGSE) insisted on pedagogical concepts such as comprehensiveness, integration and attention to diversity, adaptation to students with special educational needs (Alumnos con Necesidades Específicas de Apoyo Educativo, ACNEAE), differentiation of educational content into conceptual, procedural and attitudinal, transversality, education in values or preference for active and participatory methodologies.

It extended compulsory education from the age of six to 16 (previously set at 14), preceded by non-compulsory pre-school education. The compulsory courses are six years of Primary Education and four years of Compulsory Secondary Education (Educación Secundaria Obligatoria (ESO), which replaces the last two years of the former EGB and the first two years of the former BUP), followed by post-compulsory secondary education: a two-year Baccalaureate or the "Grado Medio" of the new Professional Education structure.

However, the objective of compulsory schooling for all fifteen- and sixteen-year-olds was not achieved until 1999, given the long implementation periods.

==== Organic Law on the Quality of Education (LOCE) of 2002 ====
Promoted by the Ministry of Pilar del Castillo (PP government). The Organic Law on the Quality of Education (Ley Orgánica de la Educación de 2002, LOCE) published in 2002, its implementation deadlines did not allow it to be implemented for the most part, since after the 2004 elections the parliamentary majority and the government changed.

==== Organic Law on Education (LOE) of 2006 ====
The Organic Law on Education (Ley Orgánica de Educación de 2006, LOE) was promoted by the ministries of María Jesús San Segundo and Mercedes Cabrera (PSOE government).

==== Organic Law for the Improvement of the Quality of Education (LOMCE) of 2013 ====
The Organic Law for the Improvement of the Quality of Education (Ley Orgánica para la Mejora de la Calidad Educativa de 2013, LOMCE) was promoted by the ministry of José Ignacio Wert (PP government).

==== Organic Law for the Modification of the LOE (LOMLOE) of 2020 ====
The Organic Law for the Modification of the LOE (Ley Orgánica de Modificación de la LOE de 2020, LOMLOE) was promoted by the ministry of Isabel Celaá (PSOE-UP coalition government), it is still in force (2024).

== See also ==
- Education in Spain
