= Donato Stampa =

Roman catholic prelate

The Most Reverend Donato Stampa
- Bishop of Nepi e Sutri
- Church: Catholic Church
- Diocese: Diocese of Nepi e Sutri
- In office: 1569–1575
- Predecessor: Camillo Campeggi
- Successor: Alessio Stradella

Orders
- Consecration: 8 January 1570 by Scipione Rebiba

Personal details
- Died: 1575

Donato Stampa (died 1575) was a Roman Catholic prelate who served as Bishop of Nepi e Sutri (1569–1575).

== Biography ==
On 14 December 1569, Donato Stampa was appointed during the papacy of Pope Pius V as Bishop of Nepi e Sutri. On 8 January 1570, he was consecrated bishop by Scipione Rebiba, Cardinal-Priest of Sant'Angelo in Pescheria, with Galeazzo Gegald, Bishop Emeritus of Bagnoregio, and Umberto Locati, Bishop of Bagnoregio, serving as co-consecrators. He served as Bishop of Nepi e Sutri until his death in 1575.

== External links and additional sources ==
- Cheney, David M. "Diocese of Nepi e Sutri". Catholic-Hierarchy.org. (for Chronology of Bishops) ^{[self-published]}
- Chow, Gabriel. "Titular Episcopal See of Nepi (Italy)". GCatholic.org. (for Chronology of Bishops) ^{[self-published]}

Catholic Church titles
Preceded by Camillo Campeggi	Bishop of Nepi e Sutri; 1569–1575	Succeeded by Alessio Stradella
