= Uldericus Nardi =

17th and 18th-century Italian Catholic bishop

Most Reverend Uldericus Nardi
- Bishop of Bagnoregio
- Church: Catholic Church
- Diocese: Diocese of Bagnoregio
- In office: 1698–1705
- Predecessor: Vincentius degl'Atti
- Successor: Onofrio Elisei

Orders
- Ordination: 18 October 1667
- Consecration: 25 July 1698 by Emmanuel-Theódose de la Tour d'Auvergne de Bouillon

Personal details
- Born: 5 May 1637 Poppi, Italy
- Died: 17 April 1705 (age 67) Bagnoregio, Italy

Uldericus Nardi (1637–1705) was a Roman Catholic prelate who served as Bishop of Bagnoregio (1698–1705).

== Biography ==
Uldericus Nardi was born in Poppi, Italy on 5 May 1637 and ordained a priest on 18 October 1667. On 21 July 1698, he was appointed during the papacy of Pope Innocent XII as Bishop of Bagnoregio. On 25 July 1698, he was consecrated bishop by Emmanuel-Theódose de la Tour d'Auvergne de Bouillon, Cardinal-Bishop of Porto e Santa Rufina, with Francesco Pannocchieschi d'Elci, Archbishop of Pisa, and Prospero Bottini, Titular Archbishop of Myra, serving as co-consecrators. He served as Bishop of Bagnoregio until his death on 17 April 1705.

== Episcopal succession ==
While bishop, Nardi was the principal co-consecrator of:

- Giulio Troili, Bishop of Foligno (1698); and
- George Witham, Titular Bishop of Marcopolis (1703).

Catholic Church titles
Preceded by Vincentius degl'Atti	Bishop of Bagnoregio; 1698–1705	Succeeded by Onofrio Elisei
