= Bocca =

Bocca is an Italian surname meaning mouth. Notable people with this surname include:

- Geoffrey Bocca (1924–1983), English novelist and historian
- Giorgio Bocca (1920–2011), Italian essayist and journalist
- Julio Bocca (born 1967), Argentine ballet dancer
- Pietro Bocca (died 1487), Italian bishop
