= Ferdinando Castiglia =

Italian Roman Catholic bishop (died 1521)

Most Reverend Ferdinando Castiglia
- Bishop of Bagnoregio
- Church: Catholic Church
- Diocese: Diocese of Bagnoregio
- In office: 1500–1521
- Predecessor: Bartolomé Martí
- Successor: Corrado Manili

Personal details
- Died: 1521 Bagnoregio, Italy

Ferdinando Castiglia (died 1521) was a Roman Catholic prelate who served as Bishop of Bagnoregio (1500–1521).

== Biography ==
On 4 May 1500, Ferdinando Castiglia was appointed during the papacy of Pope Alexander VI as Bishop of Bagnoregio. He served as Bishop of Bagnoregio until his death in 1521.

While bishop, he was the principal co-consecrator of Stefan Tschugli, Titular Bishop of Belline and Auxiliary Bishop of Chur (1501).

== See also ==
- Catholic Church in Italy

== External links and additional sources ==
- Cheney, David M. "Diocese of Bagnoregio (Bagnorea)". Catholic-Hierarchy.org. (for Chronology of Bishops) ^{[self-published]}
- Chow, Gabriel. "Titular Episcopal See of Bagnoregio (Italy)". GCatholic.org. (for Chronology of Bishops) ^{[self-published]}

Catholic Church titles
Preceded by Bartolomé Martí	Bishop of Bagnoregio; 1500–1521	Succeeded by Corrado Manili
