= Giovanni Paolo Meniconi =

Italian Catholic bishop (1629–1694)

Most Reverend Giovanni Paolo Meniconi
- Bishop of Bagnoregio
- Church: Catholic Church
- Diocese: Diocese of Bagnoregio
- In office: 1680–1694
- Predecessor: Vincenzo Candiotti
- Successor: Vincentius degl'Atti

Orders
- Consecration: 1 May 1680 by Federico Baldeschi Colonna

Personal details
- Born: 1629 Perugia, Italy
- Died: 24 December 1694 (aged 64–65) Bagnoregio, Italy

Giovanni Paolo Meniconi (1629 – 24 December 1694) was a Roman Catholic prelate who served as Bishop of Bagnoregio (1680–1694).

== Biography ==
Giovanni Paolo Meniconi was born in Perugia, Italy in 1629. On 29 April 1680, he was appointed during the papacy of Pope Innocent XI as Bishop of Bagnoregio. On 1 May 1680, he was consecrated bishop by Federico Baldeschi Colonna, Cardinal-Priest of San Marcello, with Francesco Casati, Titular Archbishop of Trapezus, and Prospero Bottini, Titular Archbishop of Myra, serving as co-consecrators. He served as Bishop of Bagnoregio until his death on 24 December 1694.

== External links and additional sources ==
- Cheney, David M. "Diocese of Bagnoregio (Bagnorea)". Catholic-Hierarchy.org. (for Chronology of Bishops) ^{[self-published]}
- Chow, Gabriel. "Titular Episcopal See of Bagnoregio (Italy)". GCatholic.org. (for Chronology of Bishops) ^{[self-published]}

Catholic Church titles
Preceded by Vincenzo Candiotti	Bishop of Bagnoregio; 1680–1694	Succeeded by Vincentius degl'Atti
