= Claude de La Baume =

Claude de La Baume (1534–1584) was a French Roman Catholic bishop and cardinal.

== Biography ==
Claude de La Baume was born in Franche-Comté in 1534, the son of Claude de La Baume, baron of Saint-Sorlin, and his second wife, Guillemette d'Igny. He was the nephew of Cardinal Pierre de La Baume.

On 27 June 1543 he was elected Archbishop of Besançon. Because he was not yet of age, Pope Paul III on 11 May 1544 agreed to appoint an administrator for the diocese until La Baume reached the canonical age of 27.

He was educated at the University of Dole and ordained as a priest on 10 August 1566. He became Abbot of Montigny-lès-Cherlieu and of Saint-Claude. He then traveled to Rome together with Antoine Lullo, his vicar general to pay the visit ad limina Apostolorum. On 4 June 1570, he was consecrated as a bishop in the Sistine Chapel by Cardinal Otto Truchsess von Waldburg assisted by Antonio Elio, Titular Patriarch of Jerusalem, and Galeazzo Gegald, Bishop Emeritus of Bagnoregio. In 1571, he promulgated the decrees of the Council of Trent in Besançon. He was opposed to the spread of Calvinism in his diocese, defeating a Calvinist force in 1575, preventing the fall of Burgundy to the Huguenots.

Pope Gregory XIII made him a cardinal priest in the consistory of 21 February 1578. He received the titular church of Santa Pudenziana on 24 August 1580; the red hat was sent to him. Philip II of Spain named him secretary of memorials, counselor of the ecclesiastical department and viceroy of the Kingdom of Naples, but he died before taking up the post.

He died in Arbois on 14 June 1584. He was buried in Arbois in the Saint Just church.
