= Giovanni Mercurio de Vipera =

Most Reverend Giovanni Mercurio de Vipera
- Bishop of Bagnoregio
- Church: Catholic Church
- Diocese: Diocese of Bagnoregio
- In office: 1523–1527
- Predecessor: Ugo de Spina
- Successor: Francisco de Solís Quiñones y Montenegro

Personal details
- Died: 26 May 1527 Bagnoregio, Italy

Giovanni Mercurio de Vipera (died 26 May 1527) was a Roman Catholic prelate who served as Bishop of Bagnoregio (1523–1527).

== Biography ==
On 23 March 1523, Giovanni Mercurio de Vipera was appointed during the papacy of Pope Adrian VI as Bishop of Bagnoregio. He served as Bishop of Bagnoregio until his death on 26 May 1527.

== External links and additional sources ==
- Cheney, David M. "Diocese of Bagnoregio (Bagnorea)". Catholic-Hierarchy.org. (for Chronology of Bishops) ^{[self-published]}
- Chow, Gabriel. "Titular Episcopal See of Bagnoregio (Italy)". GCatholic.org. (for Chronology of Bishops) ^{[self-published]}

Catholic Church titles
Preceded by Ugo de Spina	Bishop of Bagnoregio; 1523–1527	Succeeded by Francisco de Solís Quiñones y Montenegro
