= Ugo de Spina =

Italian Roman Catholic prelate

Most Reverend Ugo de Spina
- Bishop-elect of Bagnoregio
- Church: Catholic Church
- Diocese: Diocese of Bagnoregio
- In office: 1522–1523
- Predecessor: Corrado Manili
- Successor: Giovanni Mercurio de Vipera

Personal details
- Died: 1523 Bagnoregio, Italy

Ugo de Spina (died 1523) was a Roman Catholic prelate who served as Bishop-elect of Bagnoregio (1522–1523).

== Biography ==
In December 1522, Ugo de Spina was appointed during the papacy of Pope Adrian VI as Bishop of Bagnoregio. He served as Bishop of Bagnoregio until his death in 1523.

== External links and additional sources ==
- Cheney, David M. "Diocese of Bagnoregio (Bagnorea)". Catholic-Hierarchy.org. (for Chronology of Bishops) ^{[self-published]}
- Chow, Gabriel. "Titular Episcopal See of Bagnoregio (Italy)". GCatholic.org. (for Chronology of Bishops) ^{[self-published]}

Catholic Church titles
Preceded by Corrado Manili	Bishop-elect of Bagnoregio; 1522–1523	Succeeded by Giovanni Mercurio de Vipera
