= Corrado Manili =

Italian Roman Catholic prelate

Most Reverend Corrado Manili
- Bishop of Bagnoregio
- Church: Catholic Church
- Diocese: Diocese of Bagnoregio
- In office: 1521–1522
- Predecessor: Ferdinando Castiglia
- Successor: Ugo de Spina

Personal details
- Died: 1522 Bagnoregio, Italy

Corrado Manili (died 1522) was a Roman Catholic prelate who served as Bishop of Bagnoregio (1521–1522).

== Biography ==
On 20 September 1521, Corrado Manili was appointed during the papacy of Pope Leo X as Bishop of Bagnoregio. He served as Bishop of Bagnoregio until his death in 1522.

== External links and additional sources ==
- Cheney, David M. "Diocese of Bagnoregio (Bagnorea)". Catholic-Hierarchy.org. (for Chronology of Bishops) ^{[self-published]}
- Chow, Gabriel. "Titular Episcopal See of Bagnoregio (Italy)". GCatholic.org. (for Chronology of Bishops) ^{[self-published]}

Catholic Church titles
Preceded by Ferdinando Castiglia	Bishop of Bagnoregio; 1521–1522	Succeeded by Ugo de Spina
