= Bartolomé Martí =

Bartolomé Martí (died 1500) (called the Cardinal of Segorbe) was a Spanish Catholic bishop and cardinal.

== Biography ==
Bartolomé Martí was born in Valencia, ca. 1430-40. Early in his career, he became the majordomo of Cardinal Roderic Llançol i de Borja (the future Pope Alexander VI). He later became a papal chamberlain.

On 27 September 1473 he was elected Bishop of Segorbe. John II of Aragon initially opposed his election, and a deal was not reached until 1478. He celebrated a diocesan synod in 1479; he held a second synod in Jérica on 8 June 1485.

He went to Rome in 1487 and remained there for the rest of his life. He initially served as Cardinal Borja's chancellor. After Cardinal Borja became pope, he made Bishop Martí majordomo of the Apostolic Palace. In 1494, he became Master of the Papal Chapel. During this period, he had an active role in the ceremonies of the papal court but had no political role.

Pope Alexander VI made him a cardinal priest in the consistory of 19 February 1496. He received the red hat and the titulus of Sant'Agata dei Goti (a deaconry raised pro illa vice to the status of titulus) on 24 February 1496. He received the see of Bagnoregio in commendam on 2 March 1497, keeping that see until his death. He was Camerlengo of the Sacred College of Cardinals from 9 January 1499 to 1500. In 1499, he became Bishop of Toul, a position he held until his death.

He died at his home in Campo Marzio on 25 March 1500. He is buried in St. Peter's Basilica.

Catholic Church titles
Preceded by Antonio da San Gimignano	Bishop of Bagnoregio; 1497-1498	Succeeded by Ferdinando Castiglia
Preceded by Bernardino López de Carvajal	Camerlengo of the Sacred College of Cardinals; 1499	Succeeded by Juan López
