= Umberto Locati =

Roman Catholic bishop (1503–1587)

The Most Reverend Umberto Locati
- Bishop of Bagnoregio
- Church: Catholic Church
- Diocese: Diocese of Bagnoregio
- In office: 1568–1581
- Predecessor: Galeazzo Gegald
- Successor: Tommaso Sperandio Corbelli

Orders
- Consecration: 25 April 1568 by Scipione Rebiba

Personal details
- Born: 1503
- Died: 17 October 1587 (age 84)

Umberto Locati, O.P. (1503 – 17 October 1587) was a Roman Catholic prelate who served as Bishop of Bagnoregio (1568–1581).

== Biography ==
Umberto Locati was ordained a priest in the Order of Preachers. On 5 April 1568, he was appointed during the papacy of Pope Pius V as Bishop of Bagnoregio. On 25 April 1568, he was consecrated bishop by Scipione Rebiba, Cardinal-Priest of Sant'Angelo in Pescheria. He served as Bishop of Bagnoregio until his resignation in 1581. He died on 17 October 1587.

== Episcopal succession ==
While bishop, he was the principal co-consecrator of:

- Gonzalo Herrera Olivares, Auxiliary Bishop of Burgos (1568);
- Giovanni Battista Santorio, Bishop of Alife (1568);
- Serafino Fortibraccia, Bishop of Nemosia (1569);
- Prospero Vitelliano, Bishop of Bisignano (1569);
- Ambrogio Salvio, Bishop of Nardò (1569);
- Vincenzo Ercolano, Bishop of Sarno (1570);
- Donato Stampa, Bishop of Nepi e Sutri (1570);
- Maurice MacBrien, Bishop of Emly (1571);
- Vincenzo de Doncelli, Bishop of Valva e Sulmona (1571);
- Pietro Cancellieri, Bishop of Lipari (1571); and
- Sisto Diuzioli, Bishop of Carinola (1572).

== External links and additional sources ==
- Cheney, David M. "Diocese of Bagnoregio (Bagnorea)". Catholic-Hierarchy.org. (for Chronology of Bishops) ^{[self-published]}
- Chow, Gabriel. "Titular Episcopal See of Bagnoregio (Italy)". GCatholic.org. (for Chronology of Bishops) ^{[self-published]}

Catholic Church titles
Preceded by Galeazzo Gegald	Bishop of Bagnoregio; 1568–1581	Succeeded by Tommaso Sperandio Corbelli
