= Francisco de Solís Quiñones y Montenegro =

Most Reverend Francisco de Solís Quiñones y Montenegro
- Bishop of Bagnoregio
- Church: Catholic Church
- Diocese: Diocese of Bagnoregio
- In office: 1528–1545
- Predecessor: Giovanni Mercurio de Vipera
- Successor: Nicolò Vernely

Personal details
- Born: Spain
- Died: 1545 Bagnoregio, Italy

Francisco de Solís Quiñones y Montenegro (died 1545) was a Roman Catholic prelate who served as Bishop of Bagnoregio (1528–1545).

== Biography ==
Francisco de Solís Quiñones y Montenegro was born in Spain ordained a priest in the Military Order of Saint James of the Sword. On 24 January 1528, he was appointed during the papacy of Pope Clement VII as Bishop of Bagnoregio. He served as Bishop of Bagnoregio until his death in 1545.

== External links and additional sources ==
- Cheney, David M. "Diocese of Bagnoregio (Bagnorea)". Catholic-Hierarchy.org. (for Chronology of Bishops) ^{[self-published]}
- Chow, Gabriel. "Titular Episcopal See of Bagnoregio (Italy)". GCatholic.org. (for Chronology of Bishops) ^{[self-published]}

Catholic Church titles
Preceded by Giovanni Mercurio de Vipera	Bishop of Bagnoregio; 1528–1545	Succeeded by Nicolò Vernely
