= Pietro Bocca =

Most Reverend Pietro Bocca
- Bishop of Bagnoregio
- Church: Catholic Church
- Diocese: Diocese of Bagnoregio
- In office: 1475–1487
- Predecessor: Angelo Pisani
- Successor: Antonio da San Gimignano

Personal details
- Died: 1487 Bagnoregio, Italy

Pietro Bocca (died 1487) was a Roman Catholic prelate who served as Bishop of Bagnoregio (1475–1487).

== Biography ==
On 6 November 1475, Pietro Bocca was appointed during the papacy of Pope Sixtus IV as Bishop of Bagnoregio. He served as Bishop of Bagnoregio until his death in 1487 (although his death date is not certain with other records stating 1483).

== See also ==
- Catholic Church in Italy

== External links and additional sources ==
- Cheney, David M. "Diocese of Bagnoregio (Bagnorea)". Catholic-Hierarchy.org. (for Chronology of Bishops) ^{[self-published]}
- Chow, Gabriel. "Titular Episcopal See of Bagnoregio (Italy)". GCatholic.org. (for Chronology of Bishops) ^{[self-published]}

Catholic Church titles
Preceded by Angelo Pisani	Bishop of Bagnoregio; 1475–1487	Succeeded by Antonio da San Gimignano
