= Mario Rizzi =

Italian titular archbishop and apostolic nuncio

Mario Rizzi (3 March 1926 – 13 April 2012) was the Roman Catholic Italian titular archbishop of Bagnoregio and apostolic nuncio to Bulgaria 1991–1996.

Ordained to the priesthood in 1948, Rizzi became bishop in 1991.
