= Diocese of Bagnoregio =

Coordinates: 42°14′28.6″N 12°13′34.4″E

The Diocese of Bagnoregio is a former Catholic territory, located in the modern Province of Viterbo in the Italian region of Lazio, located about 90 kilometres (56 mi) northwest of Rome. Prior to the creation of the Kingdom of Italy, it belonged to the Papal States, and was located in the region of Umbria. It had been given to the Papal States by the Emperor Louis I in 822. In terms of religious administration, it was directly dependent upon the Holy See (Papacy). The pope appointed an Apostolic Administrator for the diocese of Bagnoregio on 8 June 1970, and the bishop was not replaced when he died in 1971. The diocese was suppressed on 30 September 1986 by Pope John Paul II.

== History ==
According to tradition, St. Ansanus preached the Gospel here in the third century and the church of Santa Maria delle Carceri outside the Alban Gate was said to have been built above the prison in which he was confined. He was not, however, a bishop.

There are no records as to the date of the erection of the diocese. Pope Gregory I, about the year 600, was informed of the election of the deacon John in Bagnoregio, and a letter of the Pope to the Bishop of Chiusi instructs the bishop to investigate the election, since the deacon John was not known by the Pope. The result of the investigation is unknown, and it cannot be said that deacon John became bishop.

The diocese grew over the centuries, gaining territories from the dioceses of Perugia and Orvieto, and incorporating what had been the diocese of Bomarzo. The latest known bishop of Bomarzo is recorded in the Roman synod of Pope Benedict VIII in 1015.

Up to the time of pope Urban V, Montefiascone was part of the Diocese of Castrum Balneorensis (Bagnoregio's Latin name), but on 31 August 1369 it was separated out by Pope Urban and made the seat of a new diocese. Ferdinando Ughelli, without any documentary proof, claims the Diocese of Bagnorea was joined to the Diocese of Viterbo on 4 February 1449, but neglects to mention when they were reestablished as separate dioceses.

At the end of the 17th century, the diocese was composed of 12 towns (oppida) and 6 villages (villae). In 1680, the city of Bagnoregio had approximately 1800 inhabitants. In 1764, there were some 2500 inhabitants. In 1913, the Diocese of Bagnorea contained 24 parishes; 106 churches, chapels, and oratories; 54 secular priests, 45 seminarians, 63 members of female religious orders, 2 schools for girls, and a population of 26,380.

On the morning of 11 June 1695, a very severe earthquake struck Bagnoregia. There had been three foreshocks earlier in the month, which drove people from their homes, but the earthquake of 11 June destroyed everything, leaving not a single building intact. It was described as having been as long as it takes to recite a "Pater noster". The cathedral, episcopal palace, and seminary were in ruins, as were several churches and monasteries. There were 31 dead, and 61 injured. After the earthquake and aftershocks subsided, the cathedral that had been in Civita di Bagnoregio was replaced by one at Bagnoregio itself. The transfer of the episcopal seat was ordered by Pope Innocent XII in the bull Super Universas Ecclesias of 19 February 1699.

The French army of Napoleon occupied Bagnoregio in 1810, and abolished the diocese of Bagnoregio on 12 August 1810, handing it over to the diocese of Montefiascone. This uncanonical act was never approved by Pope Pius VII, who was a prisoner of Napoleon at Fontainebleau until 1814.

=== Chapter and cathedral ===
The cathedral in civitas Bagnoregio was dedicated to Saint Donatus.

In 1621, the cathedral was administered by a Chapter composed of one dignity, the Archdeacon, and seven Canons. In 1764, there were two dignities and fourteen Canons.

=== Diocesan synods ===
A diocesan synod was an irregularly held, but important, meeting of the bishop of a diocese and his clergy. Its purpose was (1) to proclaim generally the various decrees already issued by the bishop; (2) to discuss and ratify measures on which the bishop chose to consult with his clergy; (3) to publish statutes and decrees of the diocesan synod, of the provincial synod, and of the Holy See. As of 1862, the bishops of Bagnoregio had presided over eighteen synods.

Bishop Umberto Locati (1568–1587) held a diocesan synod in 1573. Bishop Carlo Trotti (1598–1611) held a synod in 1599. Bishop Lelio Ruini (1612–1621) held two diocesan synods, one in 1615, and another in 1621. Bishop Carlo Bovi (1622–1635) held four diocesan synods, in 1629, 1632, 1633, and 1634. In 1639, Bishop Pietro Paolo Febei (1635–1649) presided over a diocesan synod in the cathedral; he held another in 1646. Bishop Vincenzo Candiotti (1653–1680) held five synods, one of them in 1679.

Bishop Uldericus Nardi (1698–1705) had a synod in 1703. He was the first to hold a synod in the Cathedral of S. Nicholas and S. Donatus. Onofrio Elisei (8 Jun 1705 –1721) held two synods, in 1710 and in 1718. Bishop Onofrio Pini (24 Sep 1721 – Jun 1754 Died) presided over a diocesan synod in 1745.

Bishop Gaetano Brinciotti (1854–1867) held a diocesan synod in the cathedral on 27–29 May 1860.

=== End of the diocese ===
By the middle of 1986, papal policy in the selection of bishops had concentrated in the person of Bishop Luigi Boccadoro: the Diocese of Viterbo e Tuscania, the diocese of Acquapendente (since 1951), the diocese of Montefiascone (since 1951), and the Administratorship of the diocese of Bagnoregio (since 1971); he was also the Abbot Commendatory of Monte Cimino. On September 30, 1986, Pope John Paul II moved to consolidate these several small dioceses by suppressing them and uniting their territories into the diocese of Viterbo e Tuscania, whose name was changed to the Diocese of Viterbo. The diocese of Balnoregio ceased to exist.

In 1991, the name only (not the diocese, or its former institutions) was revived, to serve as a titular see for the benefit of the Holy See.

=== Bishops ===
==== to 1400 ====
...

- Ioannes ? (attested 600)

...
[Chiarense] (attested 680)
...

- [Anonymous] (attested 769)

...

- Alifredo (attested 826)

...

- Leo (attested 853)
- Romanus (attested 855)

...

- Aldualdus (attested 861–868)

...

- Joannes (attested 1015)

...

- Ingo (attested 1059)
- Joannes (attested 1065)
- Albertus ?

...

- Marsilius (attested 1177)

...

- Borgondius (attested 1206, 1208)

...

- Rusticus (1255 – death 1270)
- Simon (1272–1295)
- Stephanus Tasche, OP (1297–1306)
- Simon (1306–1327)
- Tramus Monaldeschi, OP (1327–1328)
- Matteo di Castelpietro, OFM (1328–1342)
- Giovanni, OFM (1342–1348)
- Giovanni da Civita Castellana (1348–1357)
- Alamanno da Montefiascone (1357–1363)
- Bonaventura Vanni, OFM (attested 1363–1402) (Roman Obedience)
- Matteo degli Avveduti, OFM (1383– 1399) (Avignon Obedience)
- Angelo ? (1399–1409 ?)

==== 1400 to 1600 ====
- Angelo (attested 1409–1437)
- Benedetto Paconati, OP (10 January 1438 – death 1445)
- Corrado da Matelica, OFM (26 September 1445 – 1446)
- Niccolò Ruggeri, OFM (27 May 1446 – 1449)
- Agostino da Bagnoregio, OESA (17 October 1449 – 1459)
- Filippo Landolfi (5 September 1459 – ?)
- Angelo Pisani (26 April 1462 – 1475)
- Pietro Bocca (6 November 1475 – death 1483 or 1487)
- Antonio da San Gimignano (21 April 1488 – death 1497)
- Bartolomé Martí (2 March 1497 – 25 March 1500), Apostolic Administrator
- Ferdinando Castiglia (4 May 1500 – death 1521)
- Corrado Manili (20 September 1521 – death 1522)
- Ugo de Spina (10 December 1522 – death 1523)
- Giovanni Mercurio de Vipera (23 March 1523 –1527)
- Francesco de Solis, OS (24 January 1528 – 1545))
- Nicolò Vernely (22 May 1545 – 1563)
- Galeazzo Gegald or Gallois de Regard (15 October 1563 – 1568)
- Umberto Locati, OP (5 April 1568 – death 1587)
- Tommaso Sperandio Corbelli (10 March 1574– death 1590)
- Francesco Serini (16 July 1590 – 6 September 1598)
- Carlo Trotti (9 October 1598 – 1611)

==== from 1600 to 1800 ====
- Lelio Ruini (1612–1621)
- Carlo Bovi (1622–1635)
- Pietro Paolo Febei (1635–1649)
- Carlo Azzolini (1649–1653)
- Vincenzo Candiotti (1653–1680)
- Giovanni Paolo Meniconi (29 Apr 1680 – 24 Dec 1694 Died)
- Vincentius degl'Atti (1695–1696)
- Uldericus Nardi (1698–1705)
- Onofrio Elisei (8 Jun 1705 –1721)
- Onofrio Pini (24 Sep 1721 – Jun 1754 Died)
- Ubaldo Baldassini, B. (1754–1764)
- Giuseppe Aluffi (11 May 1764 – 27 Feb 1789 Resigned)
- Martino Cordella (30 Mar 1789 – 7 Jan 1812 Died)

==== since 1800 ====
Sede vacante (7 January 1812 – 26 September 1814)

- Giovanni Battista Iacobini (26 Sep 1814 – 9 Jun 1832 Died)
- Luigi Carsidoni (2 Jul 1832 – 29 Jul 1833 Appointed, Bishop of Fano)
- Gaetano Baluffi (29 Jul 1833 – 27 Jan 1842 Appointed, Archbishop of Camerino)
- Giovanni Ferrini, OFMConv (27 Jan 1842 – 24 Nov 1846 Resigned)
- Felice Cantimorri, OFM Cap. (21 Dec 1846 – 23 Jun 1854 Appointed, Bishop of Parma)
- Gaetano Brinciotti (23 Jun 1854 – 16 Nov 1867 Resigned)
- Raffaele Corradi, OCD (20 Dec 1867 – 8 Jan 1884 Died)
- Ercole Vincento Boffi (24 Mar 1884 – 16 May 1896 Died)
- Eutizio Parsi (22 Jun 1896 – 13 Apr 1906 Died)
- Rinaldo Camillo Rousset, OCD (6 Dec 1906 – 18 Sep 1909 Appointed, Archbishop of Reggio Calabria)
- Giovanni Capitoli (14 Feb 1911 – 23 Aug 1911 Died)
- Emilio Poletti (28 Aug 1912 – 17 Dec 1918 Died)
- Ludovico Antomelli, OFM (10 Mar 1919 – 24 Mar 1924 Appointed, Bishop of Lodi)
- Tranquillo Guarneri (12 Nov 1926 – 21 Jul 1937 Died)
- Adelchi Albanesi (13 Dec 1937 – 14 Apr 1942 Appointed, Bishop of Viterbo e Tuscania)
- Luigi Rosa (1942–1971)

Luigi Boccadoro (1970–1986) Apostolic Administrator

=== Titular see ===
No longer a residential bishopric, Bagnoregio is today used by the Catholic Church as a titular see; holders of the title have been:

- Archbishop Mario Rizzi (28 February 1991 – 13 April 2012)
- Archbishop Guido Pozzo (3 November 2012 – ...), Secretary of the Pontifical Commission Ecclesia Dei.

== Bibliography ==
=== Reference works ===
- Gams, Pius Bonifatius (1873). Series episcoporum Ecclesiae catholicae: quotquot innotuerunt a beato Petro apostolo. Ratisbon: Typis et Sumptibus Georgii Josephi Manz. pp. 670–671. (Use with caution; obsolete)
- Eubel, Conradus, ed. (1913). Hierarchia catholica. Vol. Tomus 1 (second ed.). Münster: Libreria Regensbergiana. p. . (in Latin)
- Eubel, Conradus, ed. (1914). Hierarchia catholica. Vol. Tomus 2 (second ed.). Münster: Libreria Regensbergiana. p. 152.
- Gulik, Guilelmus (1923). Eubel, Conradus (ed.). Hierarchia catholica, Tomus 3 (second ed.). Münster: Libreria Regensbergiana. pp. .
- Gauchat, Patritius (Patrice) (1935). Hierarchia catholica. Vol. IV (1592-1667). Münster: Libraria Regensbergiana. p. .
- Ritzler, Remigius; Sefrin, Pirminus (1952). Hierarchia catholica medii et recentis aevi. Vol. V (1667-1730). Patavii: Messagero di S. Antonio. p. .
- Ritzler, Remigius; Sefrin, Pirminus (1958). Hierarchia catholica medii et recentis aevi. Vol. VI (1730-1799). Patavii: Messagero di S. Antonio. p. .

=== Studies ===
- Angelone, Elisa (2019). Dai Calanchi al Cimino: le chiese dell'antica diocesi di Bagnoregio e i loro archivi (in Italian). Viterbo: Sette Città. ISBN 978-88-7853-826-9.
- Cappelletti, Giuseppe (1846). Le chiese d'Italia: dalla loro origine sino ai nostri giorni (in Italian). Vol. quinto (5). Venice: G. Antonelli. pp. 585–612.
- Kehr, Paul Fridolin (1907). Italia pontificia (in Latin). Vol. II: Latium. Berlin: Weidmann. pp. 215–216.
- Papini, Francesco Petrangeli (1967), Origine della cattedra episcopale e serie dei vescovi di Bagnoregio, patria di san Bonaventura, in: Doctor Seraphicus XIV (1967), pp. 59–92. (in Italian) [contains a list of bishops of Balnorea, 600–1967]
- Quintarelli, Giuseppe Maria (1896). Degli uomini illustri bagnoresi del clero secolare: memorie (in Italian). Roma: F. Guggiani.
- Schwartz, Gerhard (1907). Die Besetzung der Bistümer Reichsitaliens unter den sächsischen und salischen Kaisern: mit den Listen der Bischöfe, 951-1122. Leipzig: B.G. Teubner. p. 255. (in German)
- Ughelli, Ferdinando; Coleti, Nicolò (1717). Italia sacra: sive De episcopis Italiae et insularum adjacentium (in Latin). Vol. Tomus primus. Venice: apud Sebastianum Coleti. pp. 514–519. [very unreliable for diocese of Bagnoregio]
