= Bagnoregio =

Municipality in Lazio, Italy

- Comune
- Comune di Bagnoregio
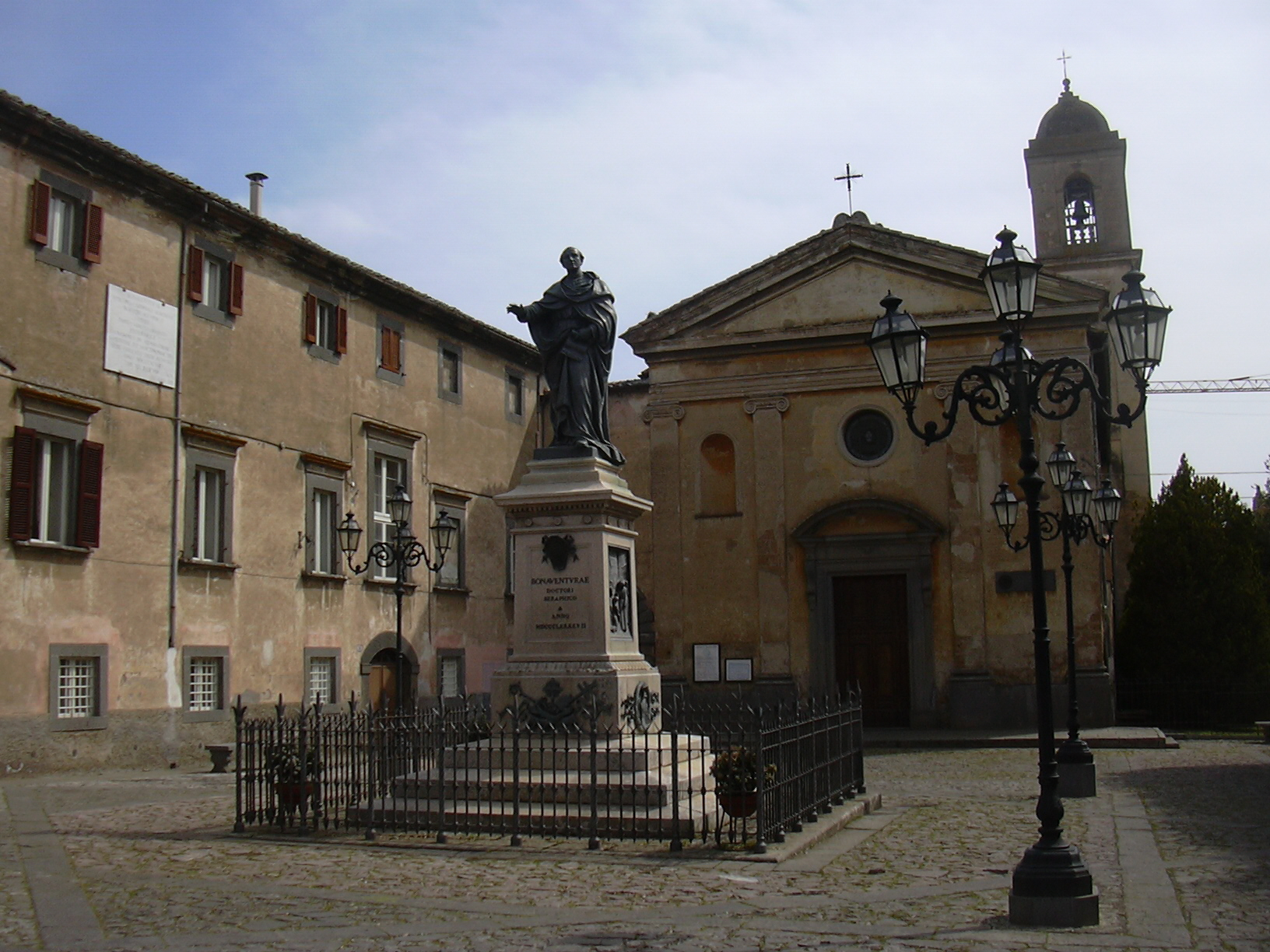
- Saint Augustine square with the Annunciation church

- Location within Italy Location within Lazio
- Coordinates: 42°37′36″N 12°5′42″E
- Country: Italy
- Region: Lazio
- Province: Viterbo (VT)
- Frazioni: Capraccia, Castel Cellesi, Civita di Bagnoregio, Ponzano, Vetriolo

Government
  - Mayor: Francesco Bigiotti (May 26, 2014 - 2nd mandate)

Area
  - Total: 72.8 km^{2} (28.1 sq mi)
- Elevation: 484 m (1,588 ft)

Population (31-12-2010)
  - Total: 3,678
  - Density: 50.5/km^{2} (131/sq mi)
- Demonym: Bagnoresi
- Time zone: UTC+1 (CET)
  - Summer (DST): UTC+2 (CEST)
- Postal code: 01022
- Dialing code: 0761
- Patron saint: St. Bonaventure
- Saint day: July 15
- Website: comune.bagnoregio.vt.it

Bagnoregio (Italian pronunciation: [ˌbaɲɲoˈrɛːdʒo]) is a comune (municipality) in the Province of Viterbo in the Italian region of Lazio, located about 90 kilometres (56 mi) northwest of Rome and about 28 kilometres (17 mi) north of Viterbo.

== History ==
The current main town was in ancient times a suburb of the hill town in the same comune now known as Civita di Bagnoregio. In ancient times this was called Novempagi and Balneum Regium, whence the medieval name of Bagnorea.

During the barbarian invasions of Italy, between the sixth and ninth centuries, the city was taken several times by the Ostrogoths and the Lombards. Charlemagne is said to have included it in the Patrimonium Petri, and the Emperor Louis I to have added it to the Papal States in 822.

It is famous as the birthplace (more specifically Civita di Bagnoregio) of the philosopher Bonaventure in the early 13th century. Writer Bonaventura Tecchi also hailed from Bagnoregio.

== Sources and external links ==
- Media related to Bagnoregio at Wikimedia Commons
- GigaCatholic
- The Fraternity of the Most Holy Virgin Mary in Bagnoregio (in Italian).
