= Ortensio Battisti =

16th-century Catholic bishop

Most Reverend Ortensio Battisti
- Bishop of Veroli
- Church: Catholic Church
- Diocese: Diocese of Veroli
- In office: 1567–1594
- Predecessor: Benedetto Salino
- Successor: Eugenio Fucci

Orders
- Consecration: 8 Dec 1567 by Egidio Valenti

Ortensio Battisti (died 1594) was a Roman Catholic prelate who served as Bishop of Veroli (1567–1594).

On 28 November 1567, Ortensio Battisti was appointed during the papacy of Pope Pius V as Bishop of Veroli. On 8 December 1567, he was consecrated bishop by Egidio Valenti, Bishop of Nepi e Sutri, with Nicola Perusco, Bishop of Civita Castellana e Orte, and Matteo Andrea Guerra, Bishop of Fondi, serving as co-consecrators. He served as Bishop of Veroli until his death in 1594.

== External links and additional sources ==
- Cheney, David M. "Diocese of Frosinone-Veroli-Ferentino". Catholic-Hierarchy.org. (for Chronology of Bishops)
- Chow, Gabriel. "Diocese of Frosinone-Veroli-Ferentino". GCatholic.org. (for Chronology of Bishops)

Catholic Church titles
Preceded by Benedetto Salino	Bishop of Veroli; 1567–1594	Succeeded by Eugenio Fucci
