= Federico Baldeschi Colonna =

17th-century Catholic cardinal

His Eminence Federico Baldeschi Colonna
- Cardinal-Priest of Sant'Anastasia
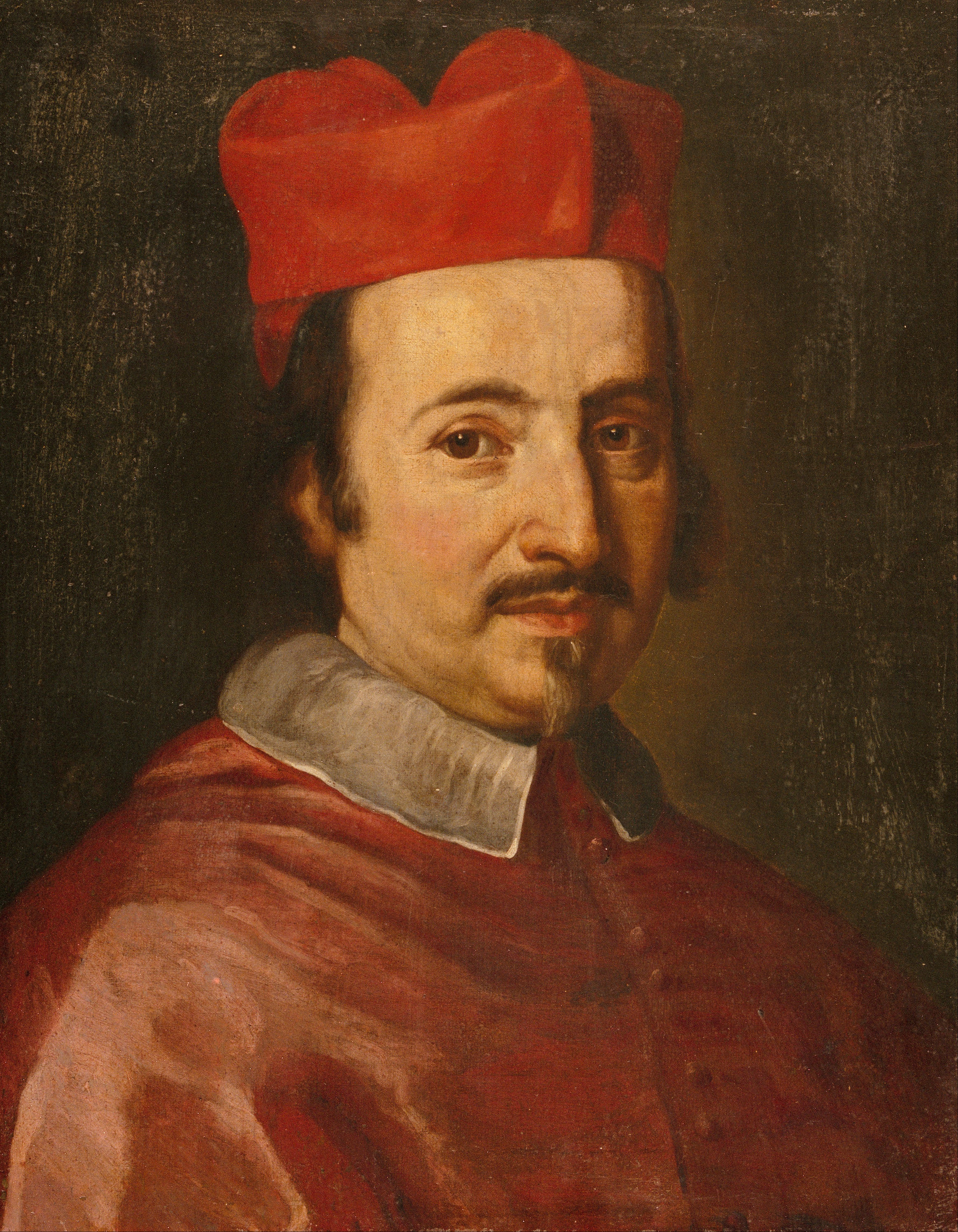
- Portrait of Cardinal Federico Baldeschi Colonna by Jakob Ferdinand Voet.
- Church: Catholic Church

Orders
- Consecration: by Federico Sforza
- Rank: Cardinal-Priest

Federico Ubaldo Baldeschi Colonna (2 September 1625 – 4 October 1691) was an Italian Catholic Cardinal who was adopted by the noble Colonna family.

== Early life ==
He was born on September 2, 1624, as Federico Ubaldo Baldeschi in Perugia, the son of Jacopo Baldeschi and Artemisia della Concia. The history of his education is unclear but he was called to Rome as a young man to assist Cardinal Giovanni Giacomo Panciroli. With Panciroli's patronage he was appointed Governor first of Faenza, then of Sabina and then finally of Fabriano. Soon after he was appointed referendary of the Tribunals of the Apostolic Signature of Justice and of Grace.

== Ecclesiastical career ==
In 1665, at the age of 40, Baldeschi was elected Archbishop of Caesarea and only days later he was appointed Nuncio in Switzerland, a position he held until 1668. In 1668, he was appointed secretary of the Sacred Congregation of Propaganda Fide. In early 1673, he was appointed an assessor of the Roman Inquisition.

== Cardinalate ==
In 1673, Baldeschi was elevated to cardinal by Pope Clement X in pectore and his elevation was published the following year, in 1674. The year after, he was appointed cardinal-priest of the church of San Marcello al Corso. Upon his elevation to the cardinalate, he was adopted by Sciarra Colonna di Carbognano and began using his adopted name; that of the Colonna family.

When Clement X died, Colonna participated in the conclave of 1676, which elected Pope Innocent XI. He was appointed Camerlengo of the Sacred College of Cardinals from 1683 until 1684. The following year, he became cardinal-priest of the Basilica di Sant'Anastasia al Palatino.

He took part in the conclave of 1689 that elected Pope Alexander VIII and joined the conclave of 1691. It eventually elected Pope Innocent XII but without Colonna who was forced to leave because of illness.

Colonna never fully recovered and he died on 4 October 1691 and was buried at the church of the Propaganda Fide.

== Episcopal succession ==
Episcopal succession of Federico Baldeschi Colonna

While bishop, he served as the principal consecrator of:

- Paolo Filocamo (bishop), Bishop of Squillace (1676);
- Carlo Filippo Sfondrati, Bishop of Volterra (1677);
- Giovanni Paolo Meniconi, Bishop of Volterra (1680);
- Filippo Lenti, Bishop of Ascoli Satriano (1680); and
- John Leyburn, Titular Bishop of Adramyttium (1685).

He also served as the principal co-consecrator of:

- Nestor Rita, Titular Bishop of Zenopolis in Lycia (1670);
- Domenico de' Marini, Titular Archbishop of Teodosia (1670);
- Domenico Gianuzzi, Titular Bishop of Dioclea (1670);
- Lorenzo Astiria, Bishop of Malta (1670);
- Francesco Buonvisi, Titular Archbishop of Thessalonica (1670);
- Francesco Nerli (iuniore), Titular Archbishop of Hadrianopolis in Haemimonto (1670);
- Giuseppe Cigala (Cicala), Bishop of Mazara del Vallo (1670);
- Filippo Soldani, Bishop of Fiesole (1670);
- Ludovicus Giustiniani, Bishop of Assisi (1670);
- Ottavio Avio, Bishop of Narni (1670);
- Ippolito Vicentini, Bishop of Rieti (1671);
- Virginio Orsini, Cardinal-Bishop of Albano (1671);
- Giovanni Rasino, Bishop of Vigevano (1671);
- John Brenan, Bishop of Waterford and Lismore (1671);
- Lodovico Malaspina, Bishop of Sansepolcro (1672);
- Sebastiano d'Alessandro, Bishop of Ruvo (1672);
- Giacomo Buoni, Bishop of Montefeltro (1672);
- Gerolamo Passarelli, Bishop of Isernia (1673); and
- Stefano de Gaspare, Bishop of Sapë (1673).
