= Ippolito Vicentini =

Italian Roman Catholic prelate

Most Reverend Ippolito Vicentini
- Bishop of Rieti
- Church: Catholic Church
- Diocese: Diocese of Rieti
- In office: 1670–1702
- Predecessor: Giulio Gabrielli
- Successor: François-Marie Abbati

Orders
- Ordination: 21 September 1670
- Consecration: 11 January 1671 by Gasparo Carpegna

Personal details
- Born: 18 June 1638 Rieti, Italy
- Died: 20 June 1702 (age 64) Rieti, Italy

Ippolito Vicentini (18 June 1638 – 20 June 1702) was a Roman Catholic prelate who served as Bishop of Rieti (1670–1702).

== Biography ==
Ippolito Vicentini was born in Rieti, Italy on 18 Jun 1638 and ordained a priest on 21 September 1670. On 22 December 1670, he was appointed during the papacy of Pope Clement X as Bishop of Rieti. On 11 January 1671, he was consecrated bishop by Gasparo Carpegna, Titular Archbishop of Nicaea, with Federico Baldeschi Colonna, Titular Archbishop of Caesarea in Cappadocia, and Francesco de' Marini, Bishop of Molfetta, serving as co-consecrators. He served as Bishop of Rieti until his death on 20 June 1702.

== External links and additional sources ==
- Cheney, David M. "Diocese of Rieti (-S. Salvatore Maggiore)". Catholic-Hierarchy.org. (for Chronology of Bishops) ^{[self-published]}
- Chow, Gabriel. "Diocese of Rieti (Italy)". GCatholic.org. (for Chronology of Bishops) ^{[self-published]}

Catholic Church titles
Preceded by Giulio Gabrielli	Bishop of Rieti; 1670–1702	Succeeded by François-Marie Abbati
