= Egidio Valenti =

Roman Catholic prelate

The Most Reverend Egidio Valenti
- Bishop of Nepi-Sutri
- Church: Catholic Church
- Diocese: Diocese of Nepi e Sutri
- In office: 1566–1568
- Predecessor: Tiberio Crispo
- Successor: Camillo Campeggi

Orders
- Consecration: 28 October 1566 by Scipione Rebiba

Personal details
- Died: 9 May 1568

Egidio Valenti (died 9 May 1568) was a Roman Catholic prelate who served as Bishop of Nepi e Sutri (1566–1568).

== Biography ==
Egidio Valenti was appointed a priest in the Order of Saint Augustine. On 25 October 1566, he was appointed during the papacy of Pope Pius V as Bishop of Nepi e Sutri. On 28 October 1566, he was consecrated bishop by Scipione Rebiba, Cardinal-Priest of Sant'Angelo in Pescheria, with Girolamo Maccabei de Toscanella, Bishop of Castro del Lazio, and Adriano Fuscone, Bishop of Aquino, serving as co-consecrators. He served as Bishop of Nepi e Sutri until his death on 9 May 1568.

== Episcopal succession ==
While bishop, he was the principal consecrator of:

- Matteo Andrea Guerra, Bishop of Fondi (1567);
- Jerome de Leonibus, Bishop of Sagone (1567);
- Tommaso Sperandio Corbelli, Bishop of Trogir (1567);
- Ascanio Marchesini, Titular Bishop of Maioren (1567);
- Maurice MacGibbon, Archbishop of Cashel (1567);
- Ortensio Battisti, Bishop of Veroli (1567);
- Giovanni Antonio Locatelli, Bishop of Venosa (1568);
- Cipriano Pallavicino, Archbishop of Genova (1568);

and the principal co-consecrator of:

- Paolo Oberti, Bishop of Venosa (1567);
- Carlo Carafa (bishop), Bishop of Guardialfiera (1567);
- Giovanni Agostino Campanile, Bishop of Minori (1567); and
- Marco Landi, Bishop of Ascoli Satriano (1567).

== See also ==
- Catholic Church in Italy

== External links and additional sources ==
- Cheney, David M. "Diocese of Nepi e Sutri". Catholic-Hierarchy.org. (for Chronology of Bishops) ^{[self-published]}
- Chow, Gabriel. "Titular Episcopal See of Nepi (Italy)". GCatholic.org. (for Chronology of Bishops) ^{[self-published]}

Catholic Church titles
Preceded by Tiberio Crispo	Bishop of Nepi e Sutri; 1566–1568	Succeeded by Camillo Campeggi
