= Bolognetti =

Bolognetti is an Italian surname. Notable people with the surname include:

- Alberto Bolognetti (1538–1585), Italian law professor, Roman Catholic bishop, diplomat, and cardinal
- Giorgio Bolognetti (1595–1680), Italian Roman Catholic bishop
