= Lenti (surname) =

Lenti is a surname. Notable people with the surname include:

- Emiddio Lenti (1628–1691), Italian Roman Catholic prelate
- Eugene Lenti (born 1957), American softball coach
- Filippo Lenti (1633–1684), Italian Roman Catholic prelate
- Frank Lenti (born 1947), Canadian outlaw biker and criminal
- Marissa Lenti (born 1992), American voice actress
