= Diocese of Ascoli =

Diocese of Ascoli may refer to:

- Roman Catholic Diocese of Ascoli Piceno
- Roman Catholic Diocese of Cerignola-Ascoli Satriano
