= Christophoro d'Authier de Sisgau =

Most Reverend Christophoro d'Authier de Sisgau
- Titular Bishop of Bethlehem
- Church: Catholic Church
- In office: 1651–1667
- Predecessor: André de Sauzay
- Successor: François de Batailler

Orders
- Consecration: 26 March 1651 by Bernardino Spada

Personal details
- Born: 6 April 1609 Marseille, France
- Died: 17 September 1667 (age 58)

Christophoro d'Authier de Sisgau, O.S.B. (1609–1667) was a Roman Catholic prelate who served as Titular Bishop of Bethlehem (1651–1667).

== Biography ==
Christophoro d'Authier de Sisgau was born in Marseille, France, on 6 April 1609 and ordained a priest in the Order of Saint Benedict. On 27 February 1651, Christophoro d'Authier de Sisgau was appointed during the papacy of Pope Innocent X as Titular Bishop of Bethlehem. On 26 March 1651, he was consecrated bishop by Bernardino Spada, Cardinal-Priest of San Pietro in Vincoli with Giorgio Bolognetti, Bishop of Rieti, and Persio Caracci, Bishop of Larino, serving as co-consecrators. He served as Titular Bishop of Bethlehem until his death on 17 September 1667.

Catholic Church titles
Preceded by André de Sauzay	Titular Bishop of Bethlehem; 1651–1667	Succeeded by François de Batailler
