= Marco Landi =

Roman Catholic prelate

The Most Reverend Marco Landi
- Bishop of Ascoli-Satriano
- Church: Catholic Church
- Diocese: Diocese of Ascoli Satriano
- In office: 1567–1593
- Predecessor: Giovanni Francisco de Gaeta
- Successor: Francesco Bonfiglio

Orders
- Consecration: 14 September 1567 by Scipione Rebiba

Personal details
- Died: 1593 Ascoli Satriano, Italy

Marco Landi (died 1593) was a Roman Catholic prelate who served as Bishop of Ascoli Satriano (1567–1593).

== Biography ==
On 22 August 1567, Marco Landi was appointed Bishop of Ascoli Satriano by Pope Pius V. On 14 September 1567, he was consecrated bishop by Scipione Rebiba, Cardinal-Priest of Sant'Angelo in Pescheria, with Giulio Antonio Santorio, Archbishop of Santa Severina, and Egidio Valenti, Bishop of Nepi e Sutri, serving as co-consecrators. He served as Bishop of Ascoli Satriano until his death in 1593. While bishop, he was the principal co-consecrator of Bartolomeo Ferro, Bishop of Lettere-Gragnano (1567).

== External links and additional sources ==
- Cheney, David M. "Diocese of Cerignola-Ascoli Satriano". Catholic-Hierarchy.org. (for Chronology of Bishops) ^{[self-published]}
- Chow, Gabriel. "Diocese of Ascoli Satriano (Italy)". GCatholic.org. (for Chronology of Bishops) ^{[self-published]}

Catholic Church titles
Preceded by Giovanni Francisco de Gaeta	Bishop of Ascoli Satriano; 1567–1593	Succeeded by Francesco Bonfiglio
