= Roman Catholic Diocese of Gallese =

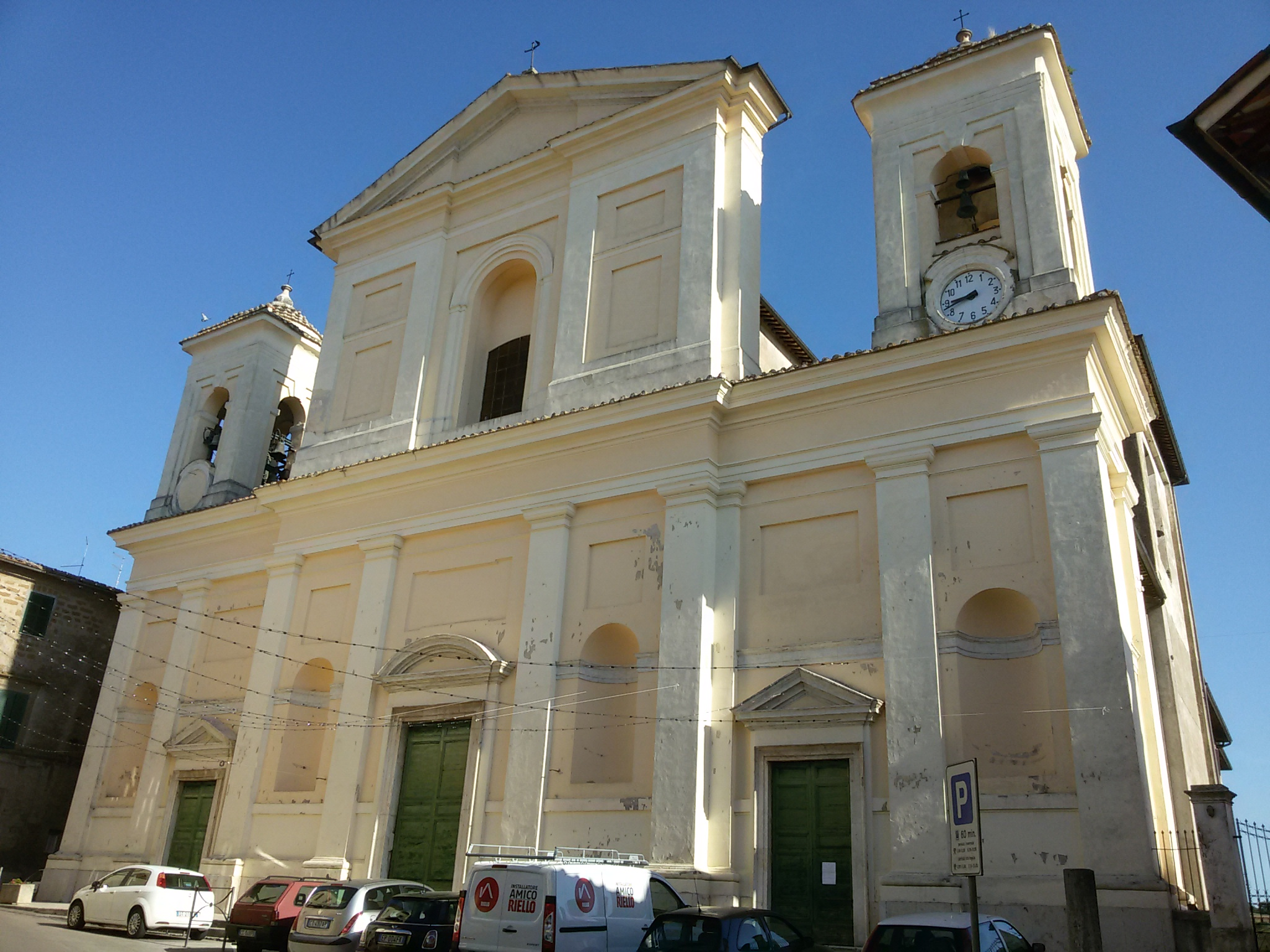
Cocathedral S. Maria Assunta

The Diocese of Gallese (Latin: Dioecesis Gallesina) was a Roman Catholic diocese located in the town of Gallese near the city of Viterbo in the Province of Viterbo. In 1805, it was united with the Diocese of Civita Castellana e Orte to form the Diocese of Civita Castellana, Orte e Gallese. It was restored as a Titular Episcopal See in 1991.

== History ==
The name Gallese does not appear in the ancient sources. The town is first mentioned by the Anonymous of Ravenna in the 7th century.

Pope Marinus I (882–884) was born in Gallese, as was Pope Romanus (897), who was deposed and forced to become a monk.

Due to the poverty of the diocese, it was suppressed in 1252, by Pope Innocent IV. It was restored by Pope Pius IV in 1562, though, after the resignation of Bishop de Alexandris in 1569, it was again suppressed.

On 26 December 1805, in the bull "Romanorum Pontificum", Pope Pius VII granted the collegiate church of S. Maria Assunta in Gallese the title of co-cathedral, though without the rights belonging to that title; and granted its canons the same canonical insignia as were enjoyed by the cathedral Chapter of Civitas Castellana, as well as the privilege of going in processions next to the cathedral canons. The bishop of Civitas Castellana et Hortana was required to add "et Gallesinus" to his official titulature.

== Bishops ==
...

- Jovianus (769)

...

- Donatus (826)
- Dominicus (853, 861)
- Stephanus ? (868 ?)
- Theodorus (c. 871–879)
- Johannes (898)
- Johannes (964–969)

...

- Hugo (1059)

...

- Girolamo Garimberti (Galimbertu) (1563-1566)
- Gabriele de Alexandris, O.P. (1566-1569 Resigned)

== Titular (arch-)bishops ==
- Antonio Franco (1992– )

== See also ==
- Diocese of Civita Castellana
- Diocese of Orte
- Catholic Church in Italy

== Sources ==
- Cappelletti, Giuseppe (1847). Le chiese d'Italia (in Italian). Vol. sesto (6). Venezia: G. Antonelli. pp. 63–67.
- Duchesne, Louis (1892). Le sedi episcopali nell'antico ducato di Roma, (in Italian), in: Archivio della romana società di storia patria Volume 15 (Roma, 1892), p. 491.
- Eubel, Conradus; Gulik, Guilelmus, eds. (1923). Hierarchia catholica (in Latin). Vol. 3 (Tomus tertius) (second ed.). Münster: Libreria Regensbergiana. p. 200.
- Kehr, Paul Fridolin (1907). Italia pontificia (in Latin). Vol. II. Latium. Berlin: Apud Weidmannos. p. 195.
- Schwartz, Gerhard (1907). Die Besetzung der Bistümer Reichsitaliens unter den sächsischen und salischen Kaisern: mit den Listen der Bischöfe, 951-1122. Leipzig: B.G. Teubner. p. 258. (in German)
- Ughelli, Ferdinando & Coleti, Niccolo (1722). Italia sacra. (in Latin). Volume 10. Venice: Sebastian Colet 1722. pp. 108-110.
