= Paolo Emilio Bruni =

Roman Catholic bishop

Most Reverend Paolo Emilio Bruni
- Bishop of Nepi e Sutri
- Church: Catholic Church
- Diocese: Diocese of Nepi e Sutri
- In office: 1507–1516
- Predecessor: Gian Giacomo Bruni
- Successor: Giacomo Bongalli

Personal details
- Died: 1516

Paolo Emilio Bruni (died 1516) was a Roman Catholic prelate who served as Bishop of Nepi e Sutri (1507–1516).

== Biography ==
On 27 August 1507, Paolo Emilio Bruni was appointed during the papacy of Pope Julius II as Bishop of Nepi e Sutri. He served as Bishop of Nepi e Sutri' until his death in 1516.

== External links and additional sources ==
- Cheney, David M. "Diocese of Nepi e Sutri". Catholic-Hierarchy.org. (for Chronology of Bishops) ^{[self-published]}
- Chow, Gabriel. "Titular Episcopal See of Nepi (Italy)". GCatholic.org. (for Chronology of Bishops) ^{[self-published]}

Catholic Church titles
Preceded by Gian Giacomo Bruni	Bishop of Nepi e Sutri; 1507–1516	Succeeded by Giacomo Bongalli
