= Gian Giacomo Bruni =

Italian Roman Catholic prelate

Most Reverend Gian Giacomo Bruni
- Bishop of Nepi e Sutri
- Church: Catholic Church
- Diocese: Diocese of Nepi e Sutri
- In office: 1506–1507
- Predecessor: Antonio Alberici
- Successor: Paolo Emilio Bruni

Personal details
- Died: 1507

Gian Giacomo Bruni (died 1507) was a Roman Catholic prelate who served as Bishop of Nepi e Sutri (1506–1507).

== Biography ==
On 6 February 1506, Gian Giacomo Bruni was appointed during the papacy of Pope Julius II as Bishop of Nepi e Sutri. He served as Bishop of Nepi e Sutri' until his death in 1507.

== External links and additional sources ==
- Cheney, David M. "Diocese of Nepi e Sutri". Catholic-Hierarchy.org. (for Chronology of Bishops) ^{[self-published]}
- Chow, Gabriel. "Titular Episcopal See of Nepi (Italy)". GCatholic.org. (for Chronology of Bishops) ^{[self-published]}

Catholic Church titles
Preceded by Antonio Alberici	Bishop of Nepi e Sutri; 1506–1507	Succeeded by Paolo Emilio Bruni
