= Angelo Altieri =

Italian Roman Catholic prelate

Most Reverend Angelo Altieri
- Bishop of Nepi e Sutri
- Church: Catholic Church
- Diocese: Diocese of Nepi e Sutri
- In office: 1453–1472

Personal details
- Died: 1472

Angelo Altieri (died 1472) was a Roman Catholic prelate who served as Bishop of Nepi e Sutri (1453–1472).

== Career ==
On 30 April 1453, Angelo Altieri was appointed during the papacy of Pope Nicholas V as Bishop of Nepi e Sutri. He served as Bishop of Nepi e Sutri until his death in 1472.

While bishop, he was the principal co-consecrator of Mamerto Fichet, Auxiliary Bishop of Genève and Titular Bishop of Hebron (1470).

== External links and additional sources ==
- Cheney, David M. "Diocese of Nepi e Sutri". Catholic-Hierarchy.org. (for Chronology of Bishops) ^{[self-published]}
- Chow, Gabriel. "Titular Episcopal See of Nepi (Italy)". GCatholic.org. (for Chronology of Bishops) ^{[self-published]}

Catholic Church titles
Preceded by	Bishop of Nepi e Sutri; 1453–1472	Succeeded by
