= Scipione Bongalli =

16th-century Catholic bishop

Most Reverend Scipione Bongalli
- Bishop of Civita Castellana e Orte
- Church: Catholic Church
- Diocese: Diocese of Civita Castellana e Orte
- In office: 1539–1564
- Predecessor: Pomponio Cecci
- Successor: Nicola Perusco

Personal details
- Born: 1501
- Died: 3 Aug 1564 (age 63)

Scipione Bongalli (1501–1564) was a Roman Catholic prelate who served as Bishop of Civita Castellana e Orte (1539–1564).

== Biography ==
Scipione Bongalli was born in 1501. On 24 Nov 1539, he was appointed during the papacy of Pope Paul III as Bishop of Civita Castellana e Orte. He served as Bishop of Civita Castellana e Orte until his death on 3 Aug 1564.

== External links and additional sources ==
- Cheney, David M. "Diocese of Civita Castellana". Catholic-Hierarchy.org. (for Chronology of Bishops) ^{[self-published]}
- Chow, Gabriel. "Diocese of Civita Castellana (Italy)". GCatholic.org. (for Chronology of Bishops) ^{[self-published]}

Catholic Church titles
Preceded by Pomponio Cecci	Bishop of Civita Castellana e Orte; 1539–1564	Succeeded by Nicola Perusco
