= Taddeo Sarti =

Roman Catholic prelate and Bishop of Nepi e Sutri

Most Reverend Taddeo Sarti
- Bishop of Nepi e Sutri
- Church: Catholic Church
- In office: 1604–1616
- Predecessor: Orazio Moroni
- Successor: Dionisio Martini

Orders
- Consecration: 7 June 1604 by Camillo Borghese

Personal details
- Born: 1540 Bologna, Italy
- Died: 24 November 1617 (age 77)

Taddeo Sarti (1540 – 24 November 1617) was a Roman Catholic prelate who served as Bishop of Nepi e Sutri (1604–1616).

== Biography ==
Taddeo Sarti was born in Bologna, Italy, in 1540. On 31 May 1604, he was appointed during the papacy of Pope Clement VIII as Bishop of Nepi e Sutri. On 7 June 1604, he was consecrated bishop by Camillo Borghese, Cardinal-Priest of San Crisogono, with Agostino Quinzio, Bishop of Korčula, and Leonard Abel, Titular Bishop of Sidon, serving as co-consecrators. He served as Bishop of Nepi e Sutri until his resignation in 1616. He died on 24 November 1617.

== External links and additional sources ==
- Cheney, David M. "Diocese of Nepi e Sutri". Catholic-Hierarchy.org. (for Chronology of Bishops) ^{[self-published]}
- Chow, Gabriel. "Titular Episcopal See of Nepi (Italy)". GCatholic.org. (for Chronology of Bishops) ^{[self-published]}

Catholic Church titles
Preceded by Orazio Moroni	Bishop of Nepi e Sutri; 1604–1616	Succeeded by Dionisio Martini
