= Roman Catholic Diocese of Orte =

Diocese in Italy

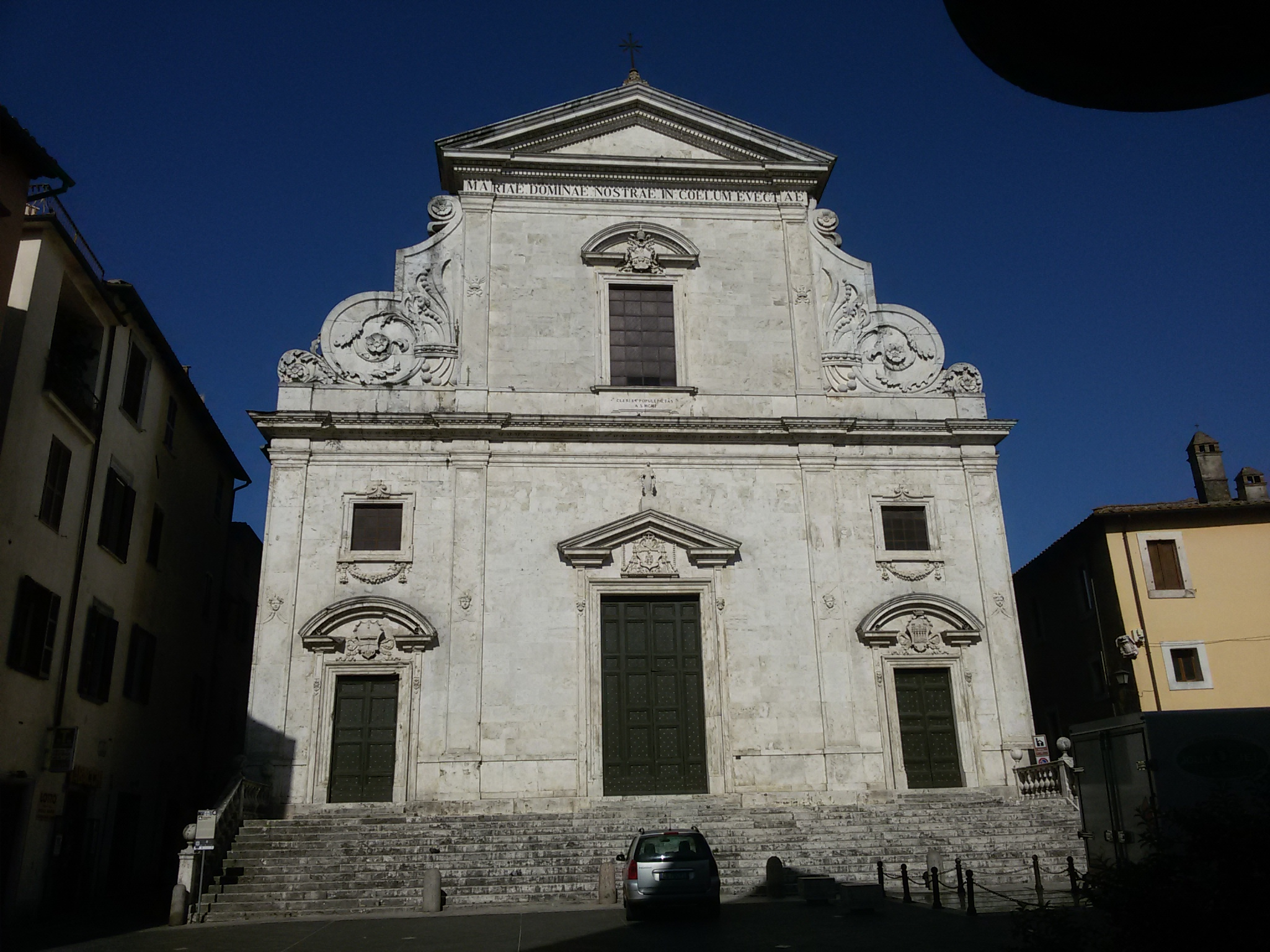
Basilica of Santa Maria Assunta, Orte

The Diocese of Orte (Latin: Dioecesis Hortanus) was a Roman Catholic diocese located in the town of Orte in the province of Viterbo in the Italian region of Latium. In 1437, it was suppressed and united with the Diocese of Civita Castellana to form the Diocese of Civita Castellana e Orte.

== History ==
In Orte, the cathedral was named Santa Maria Maggiore, and dedicated to the Assumption of the Virgin Mary. The cathedral was served by an ecclesiastical corporation called the Chapter, which was composed of one dignity (the Provost) and seventeen (or eighteen) canons.

In 1197, when the cathedral Chapter undertook the restoration of the Church of S. Giorgio, insufficient funds forced them to appeal to Pope Celestine III, who issued a call for contributions throughout the dioceses of Amelia, Narni, Todi, and Spoleto. S. Giorgio later became a monastery, under the care of the Order of S. Damiano (Poor Clares). In 1442 it was suppressed, and its income added to the income of the bishops.

In the bull "Sacrosancta Romana" of 5 October 1437, Pope Eugenius IV united the dioceses of Orte and Civita Castellana under one bishop.

== Residential Bishops ==
[ Landus (I or IV cent.) ]
[ Giovanni Montano (mentioned in 330) ]
[ Cassianus ? (363) ]
[ Leone (in 384) ]
[ Martiniano (502) ]
[ Ubaldus Prosenio ? (592) ]
[ Blandus ? (598) ]
[ Calunniosus ? (600) ]

- Julianus (649)
- Mauritius (743)
- Adone or Adamo (761, 769)
- Stephanus (I) (826)
- Arsenius (c. 855 - death August 868)
- Zaccaria (869)
- Stefano II (904)
- Pietro I (916)
- Giorgio (963)
- Lamberto (1005)
- Giovanni I (c. 1017 - after 1024)
- Landovinus (1036)
- Gregorio (in 1049)
- Rodulfus (c. 1126 - after 1149)
- Paolo I (prima del 1168 - dopo il 1196)
- Paulus (II) (c. 1200)
- Giovanni (II) (6 October 1206–after 2 October 1212)
- Guido (1221 - after 1224)
- Trasimondo (c. 1239 - after 1243)
- Giovanni (III) (in 1248)
- Pietro (II), O.F.M. (1255-1284?)
- Conradus (1284-1295?)
- Bartolomeo (1296-1298)
- Lorenzo da Velletri, O.F.M. (3 October 1298 - 1338/39)
- Nicolò Zabereschi (1 March 1339 - death 1362)
- Giovanni (IV) (1363 - ?)
- Pietro (III) (in 1365)
- Giovanni Cappucci, O.P. (1366–1393)
- Paolo Alberti, O.F.M. (12 Nov 1395–1420
- Sancius (22 Apr 1420–19 Mar 1432)
- Valentin Narnia (19 Mar 1432–5 Oct 1437)

== Titular bishops ==
In 1991 the diocese was restored in name only as the Latin Titular bishopric of Orte (Italian) / Hortanum (Latin) / Hortan(us) (Latin).

It has had the following incumbents:

- José de Jesús Madera Uribe, M.Sp.S (28 May 1991 – death 21 January 2017)
- Andrzej Przybylski (20 May 2017 – 29 August 2025)

== See also ==
- Diocese of Civita Castellana
- Diocese of Gallese

== Sources ==
=== Episcopal lists ===
- Eubel, Conradus, ed. (1913). Hierarchia catholica (in Latin). Vol. 1 (Tomus 1) (second ed.). Münster: Libreria Regensbergiana. pp. 278–279.Archived.
- Eubel, Conradus, ed. (1914). Hierarchia catholica (in Latin). Vol. 2 (Tomus 2) (second ed.). Münster: Libreria Regensbergiana. p. 166.. Archived.

=== Studies ===
- Cappelletti, Giuseppe (1847). Le chiese d'Italia (in Italian). Vol. sesto (6). Venezia: G. Antonelli. pp. 23–49.
- Kehr, Paul Fridolin (1907). Italia pontificia (in Latin). Vol. II. Latium. Berlin: Apud Weidmannos. pp. 192–194.
- Lanzoni, Francesco (1927). Le diocesi d'Italia dalle origini al principio del secolo VII (an. 604). Faenza: F. Lega. (in Italian) Pp. 546-547.
- Mamachi, Tommaso Maria (1759). F. T. M. Mamachii ... de Episcopatus Hortani antiquitate ... liber singularis. (in Latin) Roma: Palearini 1759.
- Mastrocola, Mario (1965). Vescovadi e vescovi fino alla unione del 1437. (in Italian and Latin). Pian Paradisi 1965. [Note storiche circa le diocesi di Civita Castellana, Orte e Gallese, Vol. 2].
- Ughelli, Ferdinando; Coleti, Niccolò (1717). Italia sacra, sive De Episcopis Italiae (in Latin). Vol. I (Tomus primus) (secunda ed.). Venice: apud Sebastianum Coleti. pp. 733–743.
