= Antonio Alberici =

Italian Roman Catholic prelate

Most Reverend Antonio Alberici
- Bishop of Nepi e Sutri
- Church: Catholic Church
- Diocese: Diocese of Nepi e Sutri
- In office: 1503–1506
- Predecessor: Antonio Torres (bishop)
- Successor: Gian Giacomo Bruni

Personal details
- Died: 1506

Antonio Alberici (died 1506) was a Roman Catholic prelate who served as Bishop of Nepi e Sutri (1503–1506).

On 11 October 1503, Antonio Alberici was appointed during the papacy of Pope Pius III as Bishop of Nepi e Sutri. He served as Bishop of Nepi e Sutri' until his death in 1506.

== External links and additional sources ==
- Cheney, David M. "Diocese of Nepi e Sutri". Catholic-Hierarchy.org. (for Chronology of Bishops) ^{[self-published]}
- Chow, Gabriel. "Titular Episcopal See of Nepi (Italy)". GCatholic.org. (for Chronology of Bishops) ^{[self-published]}

Catholic Church titles
Preceded by Antonio Torres (bishop)	Bishop of Nepi e Sutri; 1503–1506	Succeeded by Gian Giacomo Bruni
