= Pietro Antonio de Angelis =

Italian Roman Catholic prelate

Most Reverend Pietro Antonio de Angelis
- Bishop of Nepi e Sutri
- Church: Catholic Church
- Diocese: Diocese of Nepi e Sutri
- In office: 1542–1553
- Predecessor: Pomponio Cecci
- Successor: Antonio Simeoni

Personal details
- Died: 1553

Pietro Antonio de Angelis (died 1553) was a Roman Catholic prelate who served as Bishop of Nepi e Sutri (1542–1553).

== Biography ==
On 7 August 1542, Pietro Antonio de Angelis was appointed during the papacy of Pope Paul III as Bishop of Nepi e Sutri. He served as Bishop of Nepi e Sutri' until his death in 1553.

== External links and additional sources ==
- Cheney, David M. "Diocese of Nepi e Sutri". Catholic-Hierarchy.org. (for Chronology of Bishops) ^{[self-published]}
- Chow, Gabriel. "Titular Episcopal See of Nepi (Italy)". GCatholic.org. (for Chronology of Bishops) ^{[self-published]}

Catholic Church titles
Preceded by Pomponio Cecci	Bishop of Nepi e Sutri; 1507–1516	Succeeded by Antonio Simeoni
