= Nicola Perusco =

16th-century Catholic bishop

Most Reverend Nicola Perusco
- Bishop of Civita Castellana e Orte
- Church: Catholic Church
- Diocese: Diocese of Civita Castellana e Orte
- In office: 1565–1582
- Predecessor: Scipione Bongalli
- Successor: Andrea Longo (bishop)

Personal details
- Born: Rome, Italy
- Died: 8 February 1582

Nicola Perusco (died 1582) was a Roman Catholic prelate who served as Bishop of Civita Castellana e Orte (1565–1582).

== Biography ==
Nicola Perusco was born in Rome, Italy. On 7 Feb 1565, he was appointed during the papacy of Pope Pius IV as Bishop of Civita Castellana e Orte. He served as Bishop of Civita Castellana e Orte until his death on 8 Feb 1582.

== Episcopal succession ==
While bishop, he was the principal co-consecrator of:

- Ortensio Battisti, Bishop of Veroli (1567);
- Aurelio Griani, Bishop of Lettere-Gragnano (1570); and
- Giovanni Domenico Rebiba, Bishop of Ortona (1570).

== External links and additional sources ==
- Cheney, David M. "Diocese of Civita Castellana". Catholic-Hierarchy.org. (for Chronology of Bishops) ^{[self-published]}
- Chow, Gabriel. "Diocese of Civita Castellana (Italy)". GCatholic.org. (for Chronology of Bishops) ^{[self-published]}

Catholic Church titles
Preceded by Scipione Bongalli	Bishop of Civita Castellana e Orte; 1565–1582	Succeeded by Andrea Longo (bishop)
