= Pomponio Cecci =

Italian Roman Catholic bishop and cardinal

Pomponio Cecci (Pomponio Ceci de Lellis) (died 1542) was an Italian Roman Catholic bishop and cardinal.

== Biography ==
A native of Rome, Pomponio Cecci, he studied science, philosophy, and astronomy. He was a canon of the cathedral chapter of the Archbasilica of St. John Lateran.

On 12 August 1538 he was elected Bishop of Orte e Civita Castellana. He was transferred to the Diocese of Nepi-Sutri on 24 November 1539. He also served as Vicar-General of Rome from 1540 to 1542.

Pope Paul III made him a cardinal priest in the consistory of 2 June 1542. He received the red hat and the titular church of San Ciriaco alle Terme Diocleziane on 12 June 1542.

He died in Rome on 4 August 1542. He is buried in the family chapel in the Archbasilica of St. John Lateran.

Catholic Church titles
Preceded by Paolo Emilio Cesi	Bishop of Civita Castellana e Orte; 1538–1539	Succeeded by Scipione Bongalli
Preceded by Giacomo Simonetta	Bishop of Nepi e Sutri; 1539–1542	Succeeded by Pietro Antonio de Angelis
Preceded by Pietro Bembo	Cardinal-Priest of San Ciriaco alle Terme Diocleziane; 1542	Succeeded by Gregorio Cortese
