= Filippo Lenti =

17th-century Italian Catholic bishop

Most Reverend Filippo Lenti
- Bishop of Ascoli Satriano
- Church: Catholic Church
- Diocese: Diocese of Ascoli Satriano
- In office: 1680–1684
- Predecessor: Felice Via Cosentino
- Successor: Francesco Antonio Punzi

Orders
- Consecration: 1 May 1680 by Federico Baldeschi Colonna

Personal details
- Born: 1633 Ascoli Piceno, Italy
- Died: September 1684 (age 51) Ascoli Satriano, Italy

Filippo Lenti (1633 – September 1684) was a Roman Catholic prelate who served as Bishop of Ascoli Satriano (1680–1684).

== Biography ==
Filippo Lenti was born in Ascoli Piceno, Italy in 1633. On 29 April 1680, he was appointed Bishop of Ascoli Satriano by Pope Innocent XI. On 1 May 1680, he was consecrated bishop by Federico Baldeschi Colonna, Cardinal-Priest of San Marcello, with Francesco Casati, Titular Archbishop of Trapezus, and Prospero Bottini, Titular Archbishop of Myra, serving as co-consecrators. He served as Bishop of Ascoli Satriano until his death in September 1684.

== External links and additional sources ==
- Cheney, David M. "Diocese of Cerignola-Ascoli Satriano". Catholic-Hierarchy.org. (for Chronology of Bishops) ^{[self-published]}
- Chow, Gabriel. "Diocese of Ascoli Satriano (Italy)". GCatholic.org. (for Chronology of Bishops) ^{[self-published]}

Catholic Church titles
Preceded by Felice Via Cosentino	Bishop of Ascoli Satriano; 1680–1684	Succeeded by Francesco Antonio Punzi
