= Giulio Gabrielli =

Italian Catholic cardinal

Giuseppe Mazzuoli. Bust of Cardinal Giulio Gabrielli the Elder, ca. 1675. Rome, Museo di Roma at Palazzo Braschi

Giulio Gabrielli (1601 – 13 August 1677) was an Italian Catholic cardinal. He is sometimes referred to as Giulio Gabrielli the Elder to distinguish him from Giulio Gabrielli the Younger.

== Early life ==
Gabrielli was born 1601 in Rome, the son of Antonio Gabrielli and Prudenzia Lancellotta, of the noble Gabrielli family and relatives of Pope Clement X. He went into the service of the Church as a Referendary of the Tribunals of the Apostolic Signatura of Justice and of Grace. He was a cleric (and later dean) of the Apostolic Chamber. On 27 Apr 1642, he was consecrated bishop by Antonio Marcello Barberini (seniore), Cardinal-Priest of San Pietro in Vincoli, with Faustus Poli, Titular Archbishop of Amasea, and Celso Zani. Bishop Emeritus of Città della Pieve, serving as co-consecrators.

== Cardinalate ==
Gabrielli was elevated to Cardinal by Pope Urban VIII in December 1641 and in February 1642 was made Cardinal-Priest of Santa Maria Nova and was elected Bishop of Ascoli Piceno. He was consecrated by Cardinal Antonio Marcello Barberini. Later that year, he opted for the deaconry of Sant'Agata dei Goti. His contemporary, John Bargrave, suggested his promotions within the Church were more related to Pope Urban's wish to sell his position to a higher bidder, rather than on merit or service and that as a result, Gabrielli lived a respected but fairly meagre life. What wealth he did amass, Bargrave ascribed to his frugality.

In 1643, Gabrielli was appointed co-legate in Urbino (together with Cardinal Francesco Barberini), a position he held until 1646. He participated in the Papal conclave of 1644 but left early due to illness. The conclave elected Pope Innocent X.

He participated in the conclave of 1655 that elected Pope Alexander VII and opted for the deaconry of Santa Maria in Via Lata later that year. In March of the following year, he became Cardinal-Priest of Santa Prisca.

In 1667, he participated in the conclave which elected Pope Clement IX and was appointed Cardinal-Priest of Santa Prassede. Less than six months later, he was made Cardinal-Priest of San Lorenzo in Lucina. In 1668, he was appointed Cardinal-Bishop of Sabina but, retained the administration of Ascoli Piceno until later that year.

== Later life ==
Gabrielli served in a number of Church administrative roles during the period best described as his semi-retirement, including administrator of the Diocese of Rieti and Governor General of Fermo. He also participated in the conclaves of 1669-1670, which elected Pope Clement X, and 1676, which elected Pope Innocent XI.

He died on 31 August 1677 from malaria; he was buried in the Gabrielli chapel of Santa Maria sopra Minerva.

== See also ==
- GoodReads website, Annotated transcription of the Testament and Codicil (1677) of Cardinal Giulio Gabrielli, complete version from the State Archives of Rome.
