= Giorgio Bolognetti =

Italian Roman Catholic prelate (1595–1680)

Most Reverend Giorgio Bolognetti
- Bishop Emeritus of Rieti
- Church: Catholic Church
- Diocese: Diocese of Rieti
- In office: 1639–1660
- Predecessor: Giovanni Francesco Guidi di Bagno
- Successor: Odoardo Vecchiarelli
- Previous posts: Bishop of Ascoli Satriano (1630–1631); Apostolic Nuncio to Florence (1631–1634); Apostolic Nuncio to France (1634–1639),

Orders
- Consecration: 7 October 1630 by Luigi Caetani

Personal details
- Born: 22 December 1595 Rome, Italy
- Died: 17 January 1680 (age 84)

Giorgio Bolognetti or Gregorio Bolognetti (22 December 1595 – 17 January 1680) was a Roman Catholic prelate who served as Bishop of Rieti (1639–1660), Apostolic Nuncio to France (1634–1639), Apostolic Nuncio to Florence (1631–1634), Bishop of Ascoli Satriano (1630–1631).

== Biography ==
Giorgio Bolognetti was born in Rome, Italy on 22 December 1595. On 23 September 1630, he was appointed during the papacy of Pope Urban VIII as Bishop of Ascoli Satriano. On 7 October 1630, he was consecrated bishop by Luigi Caetani, Cardinal-Priest of Santa Pudenziana, with Antonio Ricciulli, Bishop Emeritus of Belcastro, and Benedetto Landi, Bishop of Fossombrone, serving as co-consecrators. On 8 November 1631, he was appointed during the papacy of Pope Urban VIII as Apostolic Nuncio to Florence. On 26 March 1634, he was appointed during the papacy of Pope Urban VIII as Apostolic Nuncio to France. On 28 February 1639, he was appointed during the papacy of Pope Urban VIII as Bishop of Rieti. He served as Bishop of Rieti until his resignation in 1660. He died on 17 January 1680.

== Episcopal succession ==
While bishop, he was the principal co-consecrator of:

- Scipione Pannocchieschi d'Elci, Bishop of Pienza (1631); and
- Christophoro d'Authier de Sisgau, Titular Bishop of Bethlehem (1651).

== External links and additional sources ==
- Cheney, David M. "Diocese of Cerignola-Ascoli Satriano". Catholic-Hierarchy.org. (for Chronology of Bishops) ^{[self-published]}
- Chow, Gabriel. "Diocese of Ascoli Satriano (Italy)". GCatholic.org. (for Chronology of Bishops) ^{[self-published]}
- Cheney, David M. "Nunciature to Florence (Tuscany)". Catholic-Hierarchy.org. ^{[self-published]}
- Cheney, David M. "Nunciature to France". Catholic-Hierarchy.org. (for Chronology of Bishops) ^{[self-published]}
- Chow, Gabriel. "Apostolic Nunciature France". GCatholic.org. (for Chronology of Bishops) ^{[self-published]}
- Cheney, David M. "Diocese of Rieti (-S. Salvatore Maggiore)". Catholic-Hierarchy.org. (for Chronology of Bishops) ^{[self-published]}
- Chow, Gabriel. "Diocese of Rieti (Italy)". GCatholic.org. (for Chronology of Bishops) ^{[self-published]}

Catholic Church titles
| Preceded by Francesco Andrea Gelsomini | Bishop of Ascoli Satriano; 1630–1631 | Succeeded by Michael Rezzi |
| Preceded by Alfonso Giglioli | Apostolic Nuncio to Florence; 1631–1634 | Succeeded by Giovanni Francesco Passionei |
| Preceded by Alessandro Bichi | Apostolic Nuncio to France; 1634–1639 | Succeeded by Ranuccio Scotti Douglas |
| Preceded by Giovanni Francesco Guidi di Bagno | Bishop of Rieti; 1639–1680 | Succeeded by Odoardo Vecchiarelli |
