= Diocese of Civita Castellana =

Latin Catholic ecclesiastical jurisdiction in Italy

Coordinates: 42°17′N 12°24′E

Diocese of Civita Castellana Dioecesis Civitatis Castellanae

Catholic
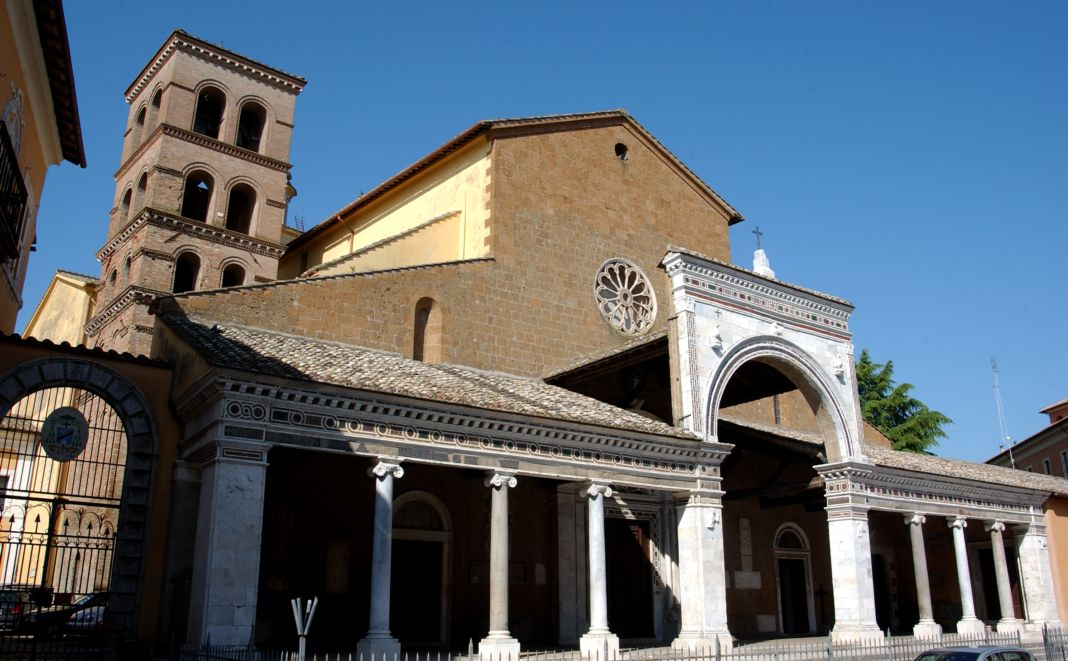
- Civita Castellana Cathedral

Location
- Country: Italy
- Ecclesiastical province: Immediately exempt to the Holy See

Statistics
- Area: 1,552 km^{2} (599 sq mi)
- Population: Total; Catholics: (as of 2023); 256,350 (est.) ▼; 245,500 (guess) ▼
- Parishes: 76

Information
- Denomination: Catholic Church
- Sui iuris church: Latin Church
- Rite: Roman Rite
- Cathedral: Basilica Cattedrale di S. Maria Maggiore (Civita Castellana)
- Co-cathedral: Basilica Concattedrale di S. Maria Assunta (Orte); Concattedrale di S. Maria Assunta (Gallese); Concattedrale di S. Maria Assunta e S. Anastasi (Nepi); Concattedrale di S. Maria Assunta in Cielo (Sutri)
- Secular priests: 109 (diocesan) ▲32 (religious Orders) ▼15 Permanent Deacons ▼

Current leadership
- Pope: Leo XIV
- Bishop: Marco Salvi
- Bishops emeritus: Romano Rossi

Website
- www.diocesicivitacastellana.it

The Diocese of Civita Castellana (Latin: Dioecesis Civitatis Castellanae) is a Latin Church ecclesiastical territory or diocese of the Catholic Church in Latium, central Italy. It has existed in the current form since 1986, when the Diocese of Nepi e Sutri was united into the Diocese of Civita Castellana, Orte e Gallese. The Diocese of Gallese had been added to the Dioceses of Civita Castellana and Orte in 1805. The name of the diocese was shortened in 1991, in accordance with Vatican policies. The diocese of Civita Castellana is immediately exempt to the Holy See.

== History ==
The earliest known bishop with his seat at Civita Castellana is Crescentius (or Crescentianus). In 998, he discovered and transported to Cività Castellana the remains of Martianus and Johannes and other deceased people. The story of these marvellous deeds was published at Rome in 1584.

The Antipope Clement III (Archbishop Wibert of Ravenna) died in Civita Castellana on 8 September 1100.

In 1252 the diocese of Gallese was incorporated with that of Civita Castellana. Reestablished in 1562, Gallese was again suppressed in 1573. During that brief period, it had two bishops, Girolamo Garimberti of Parma (1563–1565), and Gabriel degli Alessandri of Bergamo (1566–1569). The diocese of Gallese was restored on 20 December 1805, by Pope Pius VII, in the bull "Romanorum Pontificum", and the old cathedral, which had been reduced to the status of the collegiate church of S. Maria Assunta, again became a cathedral, served by twelve Canons, and headed by two dignities, the Archpriest and the Archdeacon. The diocese, however, was united to the diocese of Cività Castellana e Orte, all three dioceses having one and the same bishop, aeque personaliter.

On 5 October 1437, in the bull "Sacrosancta Romana", Pope Eugenius IV united the diocese of Orte with the diocese of Cività Castellana in the person of a single bishop. Orte (Orta, the ancient Horta) is some fifty miles north of Rome. In accordance with Pope Eugenius' decree, the bishop was required to hold his Chrism Mass (usually on Holy Thursday) and his ordinations of priests in alternate years in Orte and in Civita Castellana.

In 1748, the Chapter of the cathedral of the Annunciation in Civita Castellana was composed of one dignity and fourteen Canons. The Chapter of the cathedral of the Assumption in Orte was composed of one dignity and eighteen Canons. In the mid-19th century, the cathedral of Civita Castellana was administered and serviced by a Chapter consisting of one dignity, the Archpriest, and eighteen Canons.

Bishop Giovanni Tenderini (1718–1739) took the major steps to found a seminary, but it was not until 1746 that it opened. The diocesan seminary, like many ecclesiastical institutions, suffered under French invasion and occupation. After the French removal, the seminary was located in the former Franciscan convent next to S. Pietro in Civita Castellana. The convent had been emptied by the French occupation forces under Napoleon, and when they were driven out, permission to convert it to diocesan use was given by Pope Pius VII, and it opened in 1825.

== Bishops ==
=== Diocese of Civita Castellana ===
...

- Crescentianus (attested 996–1136)
- Benedictus (attested 1037–1050)
- Petrus (attested 1059–1065)
- Rogerius

...

- Joannes (c.1101)

...

- Petrus (attested 1126)

...

- Petrus (attested 1179–1183)

...

- Romanus (attested 1206–1212)
- Guilelmus (attested 1217)
- Petrus (attested 1219, 1230)
- Nicolaus (attested 1232–1233)

...

- Joannes Magnesi, O.P. (c.1270)
- Monaldus, O.Min. (1288–1307)
- Godefredus, O.Min. (1307–1324)
- Guilelmus, O.Carm. (1324–1331)
- Franciscus Osni, O.E.S.A. (1331–1348)
- Joannes (1348–1359)
- Stephanus, O.E.S.A. (1359–1367?)
- Joannes, O.P. (attested 1367–1377)
- Matthaeus (1382–1394?) Roman Obedience
- Geminus da Viterbo, O.Min. 1388–1390?) Avignon Obedience
- Antonius da Castronovo, O.P (1390– ? ) Avignon ObedienceAntonio:
- Angelo (1394– ? ) Roman Obedience
- Joannes de Arcionibus (1395–1406) Roman Obedience
- Stephanus, O.Min. 1406–1414) Roman Obedience
- Joannes Georgii (1414–1432)

[Sante (Sancho)]

- Joannes (attested 1435–1437 deposed)

=== Bishops of Civita Castellana e Orte ===
United: 5 October 1437 with the Diocese of Orte

- Valentinus de Narnia (1437–1442)
- Luca (1442–1443)
- Antonio Stella (1443–1455)
- Nicolas Palmeri, O.E.S.A. (1455–1467)
- Antonio (1467–1473)
- Pietro Ajosa (24 Jan 1474 –1486)
- Angelo Pechinoli (1486–1492)
- Enrico Bruno, O.P. (29 Oct 1492 –1498)
- Giorgio Maccafano de' Pireto (24 Sep 1498 –1501)
- Lodovico (1501–1503)
- Johannes Burchard (1503–1506)
- Francesco Franceschini, O.F.M. (1506–1525 Resigned)
- Cardinal Paolo Emilio Cesi (1525–1537) Administrator
- Pomponio Ceci (1538–1539)
- Scipione Bongalli (1539–1564)
- Nicola Perusco (1565–1582)
- Andrea Longo (1582–1607)
- Ippolito Fabiani, O.S.A. (17 Dec 1607 – 24 Aug 1621)
- Angelo Gozzadini (25 Oct 1621 – 29 Mar 1653)
- Taddeo Altini, O.S.A. (10 Nov 1653 – 27 Aug 1685)
- Giuseppe Antonio Sillani Leoncilli (13 May 1686 – 30 Sep 1697)
- Simone Paolo Aleotti (16 May 1698 –1704)
- Ascanio Blasi (26 Jan 1705 – Jul 1718)
- Giovanni Francesco Maria Tenderini (5 Dec 1718 – 1 Mar 1739).
- Bernardino Vari (4 May 1739 – 12 Oct 1748)
- Sante Lanucci (2 Dec 1748 – 31 May 1765 Resigned)
- Francesco Maria Forlani (5 Jun 1765 – 5 Mar 1787)
- Lorenzo de Dominicis (23 Apr 1787 – 1 Jan 1822)

=== Bishops of Civita Castellana, Orte e Gallese ===
United: 20 December 1805 with the Diocese of Gallese

- Fortunato Maria Ercolani, C.P. (19 Apr 1822 –1847)
- Amadio Zangari (1848–1851)
- Mattei Augusto Mengacci (1851–1872)
- Domenico Mignanti (1872–1889)
- Giovanni Battista Carnevalini (24 May 1889 – 9 Jun 1895)
- Giacomo Ghezzi, O.F.M.Obs. (1895–1920)
- Goffredo Zaccherini (8 Mar 1920 –1928)
- Santino Margaria (9 Oct 1930 – 20 Dec 1947)
- Roberto Massimiliani (21 Jun 1948 – 19 Jun 1975)
- Marcello Rosina (10 Apr 1976 – 11 Feb 1986, Bishop of Civita Castellana (, Orte, Gallese, Nepi e Sutri))

=== Diocese of Civita Castellana (Orte, Gallese, Nepi e Sutri) ===
United: 11 February 1986 with the Diocese of Nepi e Sutri
Latin Name: Civitatis Castellanae (Hortanus, Gallesinus, Nepesinus, et Sutrinus)
Metropolitan: Diocese of Rome

- Divo Zadi (10 Mar 1989 – 10 Dec 2007 Retired)

=== Diocese of Civita Castellana ===
Name Changed: 16 February 1991

- Romano Rossi (10 Dec 2007 – 11 Nov 2022)
- Marco Salvi (11 Nov 2022 – )

== Co-cathedrals ==
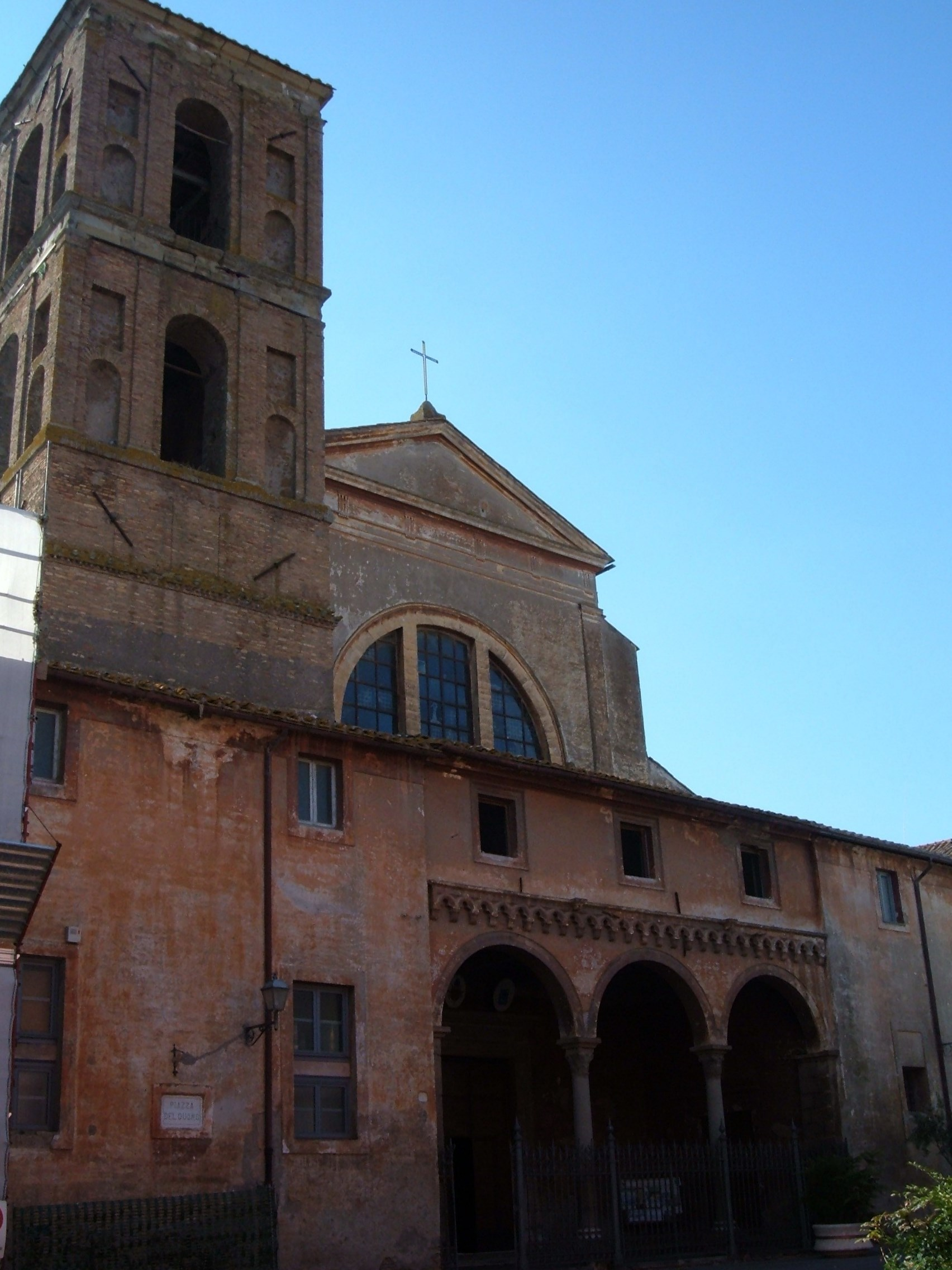
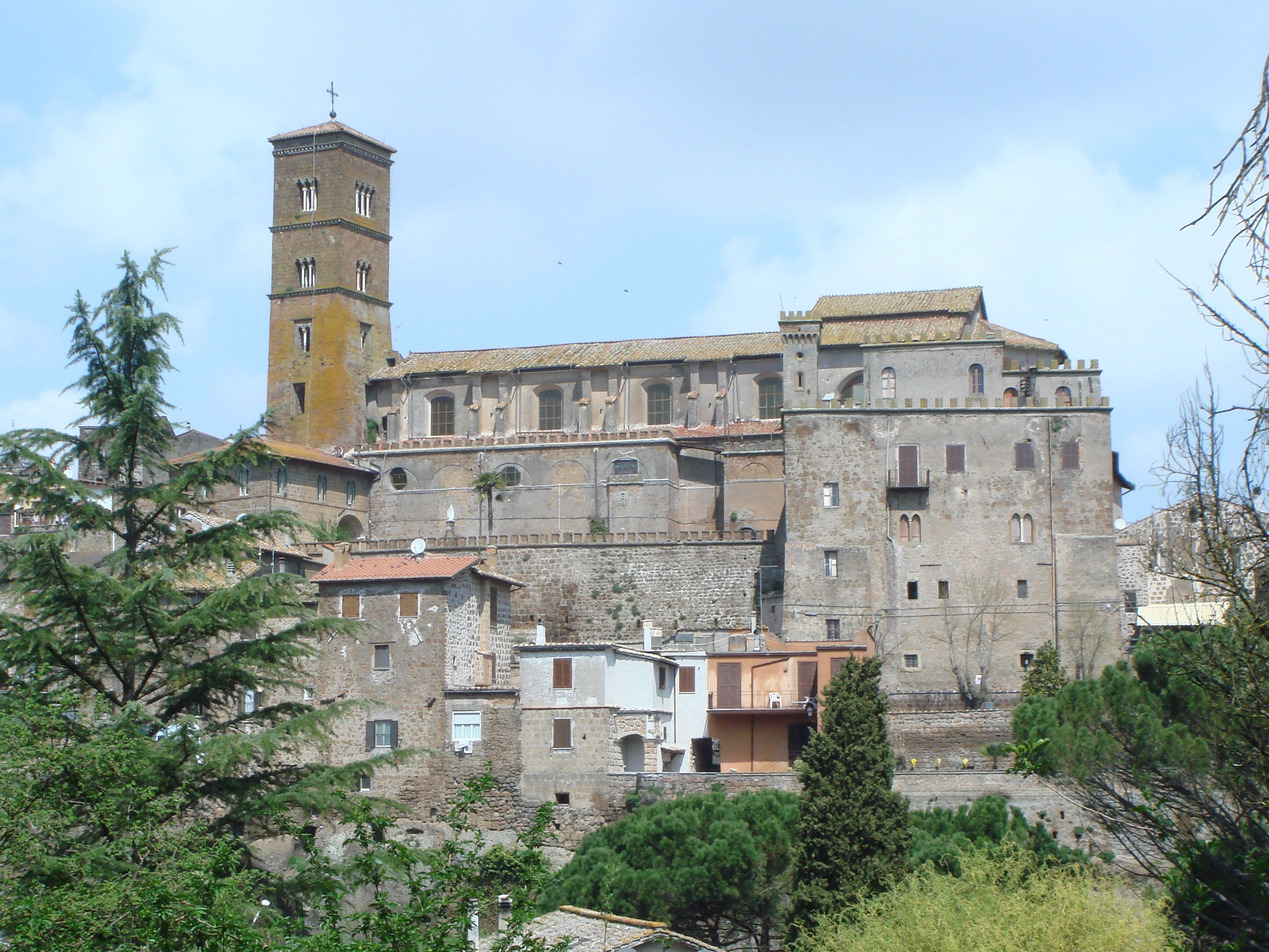
Co-cathedral in Nepi (left) Co-cathedral in Sutri (right)

== See also ==
- Diocese of Orte
- Diocese of Gallese
- Diocese of Nepi-Sutri
- Catholic Church in Italy

== Books ==
- Gams, Pius Bonifatius (1873). Series episcoporum Ecclesiae catholicae: quotquot innotuerunt a beato Petro apostolo (in Latin). Ratisbon: Typis et Sumptibus Georgii Josephi Manz. pp. 685–687.
- Eubel, Conradus, ed. (1913). Hierarchia catholica (in Latin). Vol. Tomus 1 (second ed.). Münster: Libreria Regensbergiana.
- Eubel, Conradus, ed. (1914). Hierarchia catholica (in Latin). Vol. Tomus 2 (second ed.). Münster: Libreria Regensbergiana.
- Eubel, Conradus; Gulik, Guilelmus, eds. (1923). Hierarchia catholica (in Latin). Vol. Tomus 3 (second ed.). Münster: Libreria Regensbergiana.
- Gauchat, Patritius (Patrice) (1935). Hierarchia catholica (in Latin). Vol. Tomus IV (1592-1667). Münster: Libraria Regensbergiana.
- Ritzler, Remigius; Sefrin, Pirminus (1952). Hierarchia catholica medii et recentis aevi V (1667-1730) (in Latin). Patavii: Messagero di S. Antonio.
- Ritzler, Remigius; Sefrin, Pirminus (1958). Hierarchia catholica medii et recentis aevi (in Latin). Vol. Tomus VI (1730-1799). Patavii: Messagero di S. Antonio.
- Ritzler, Remigius; Sefrin, Pirminus (1968). Hierarchia Catholica medii et recentioris aevi sive summorum pontificum, S. R. E. cardinalium, ecclesiarum antistitum series... A pontificatu Pii PP. VII (1800) usque ad pontificatum Gregorii PP. XVI (1846) (in Latin). Vol. VII. Monasterii: Libr. Regensburgiana.
- Remigius Ritzler; Pirminus Sefrin (1978). Hierarchia catholica Medii et recentioris aevi... A Pontificatu PII PP. IX (1846) usque ad Pontificatum Leonis PP. XIII (1903) (in Latin). Vol. VIII. Il Messaggero di S. Antonio.
- Pięta, Zenon (2002). Hierarchia catholica medii et recentioris aevi... A pontificatu Pii PP. X (1903) usque ad pontificatum Benedictii PP. XV (1922) (in Latin). Vol. IX. Padua: Messagero di San Antonio. ISBN 978-88-250-1000-8.

=== Studies ===
- Cappelletti, Giuseppe (1846). Le chiese d'Italia della loro origine sino ai nostri giorni (in Italian). Vol. sesto. Venezia: G. Antonelli. pp. 9–72.
- Augusto Ciarrocchi, Augusto (2018). "Civita Castellana al tempo della costruzione della cattedrale cosmatesca." (in Italian) In: 2008-2018 dieci anni di episcopato di Mons. Romano Rossi a servizio della Chiesa che è in Civita Castellana. Pubblicazione della Diocesi di Civita Castellana, 2018, pp. 288-307.
- Kehr, Paul Fridolin (1907). Italia pontificia. vol. II: Latium. Berlin 1909. pp. 184–195. (in Latin)
- Lanzoni, Francesco (1927), Le diocesi d'Italia dalle origini al principio del secolo VII (an. 604), Faenza 1927, pp. 516–517; 545–547. (in Italian)
- Mamachi, Tommaso Maria (1759). De Episcopatus Hortani antiquitate (in Latin). Roma: Palearini. p. 42.
- Mastrocola, M. (1965), Note storiche circa le diocesi di Civita Castellana, Orte e Gallese. Vols. I-III. Civita Castellana: Ed. Pian Paradisi 1965–1972. I: Le origini cristiane. Civita Castellana 1964. III: I vescovi dalla unione delle diocesi alla fine del concilio di Trento (1437-1564). Civita Castellana; Ed. Pian Paradisi 1972. (in Italian)
- Racioppa, E. (2002). La cattedrale di Civita Castellana. Civita Castellana 2002. (in Italian)
- Rossi, P. (1986). Civita Castellana e le chiese del suo territorio. Roma 1986. (in Italian)
- Schwartz, Gerhard (1913), Die Besetzung der Bistümer Reichsitaliens unter den sächsischen und salischen Kaisern : mit den Listen der Bischöfe, 951-1122, Leipzig-Berlin 1913, p. 257. (in German)
- Ughelli, Ferdinando; Coleti, Niccolò (1717). Italia sacra sive De Episcopis Italiae, et insularum adjacentium (in Latin). Vol. Tomus primus (1) (editio secunda, aucta et emendata ed.). Venice: apud Sebastianum Coleti. pp. 596–604, 733–743.
