= Diocese of Nepi-Sutri =

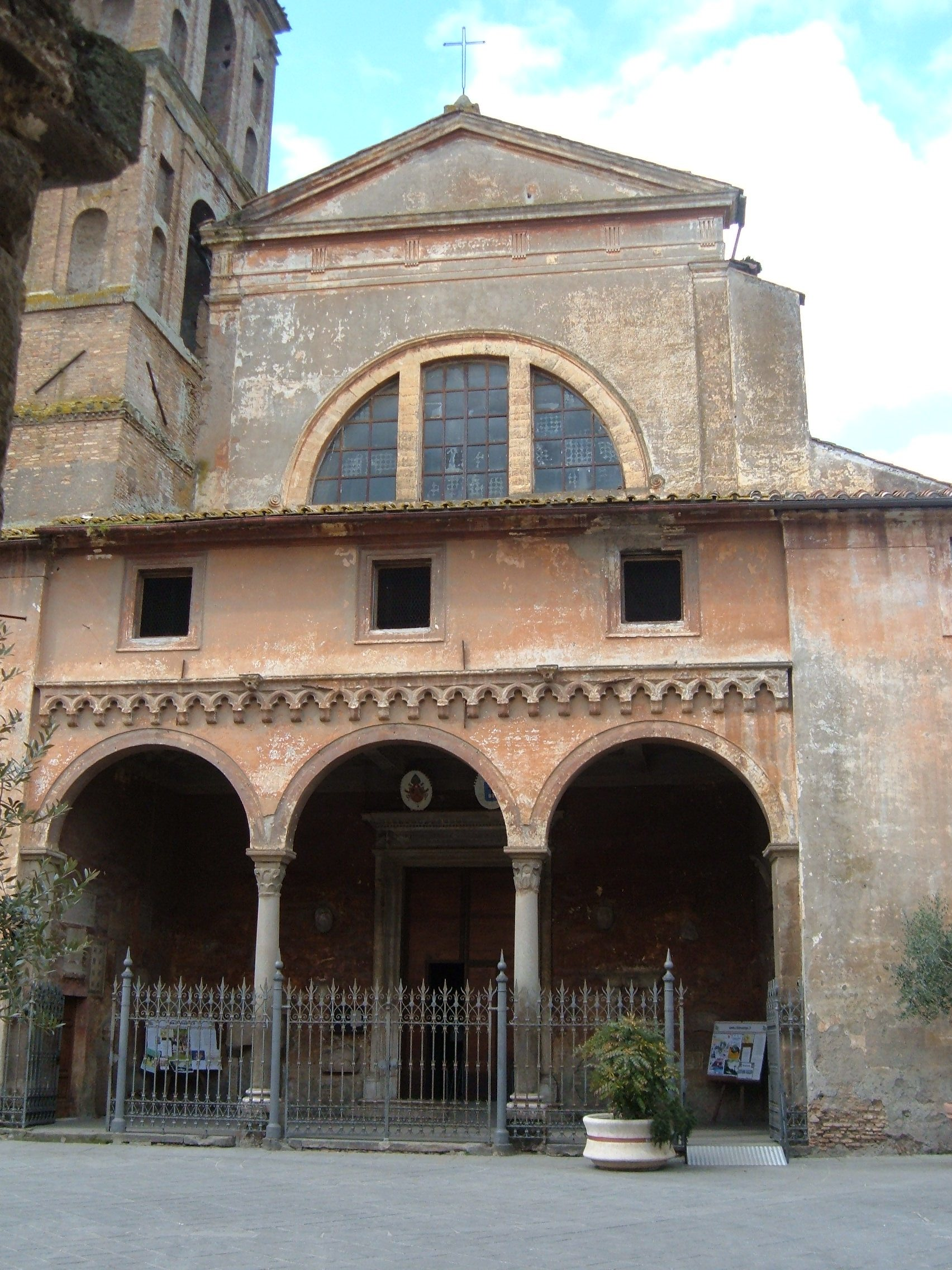
Cathedral of Santa Maria Assunta, Nepi

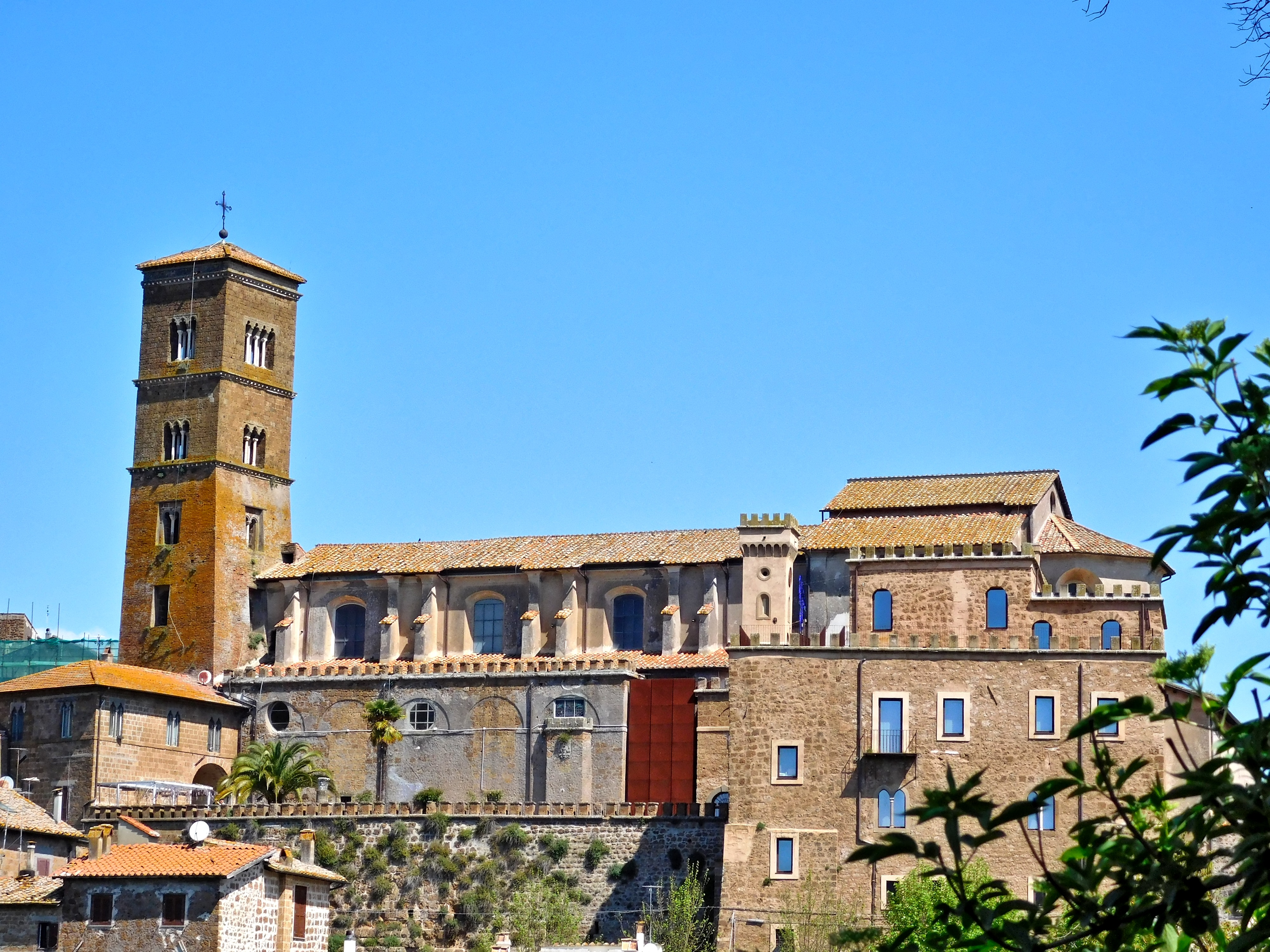
Cathedral of the Assumption, Sutri

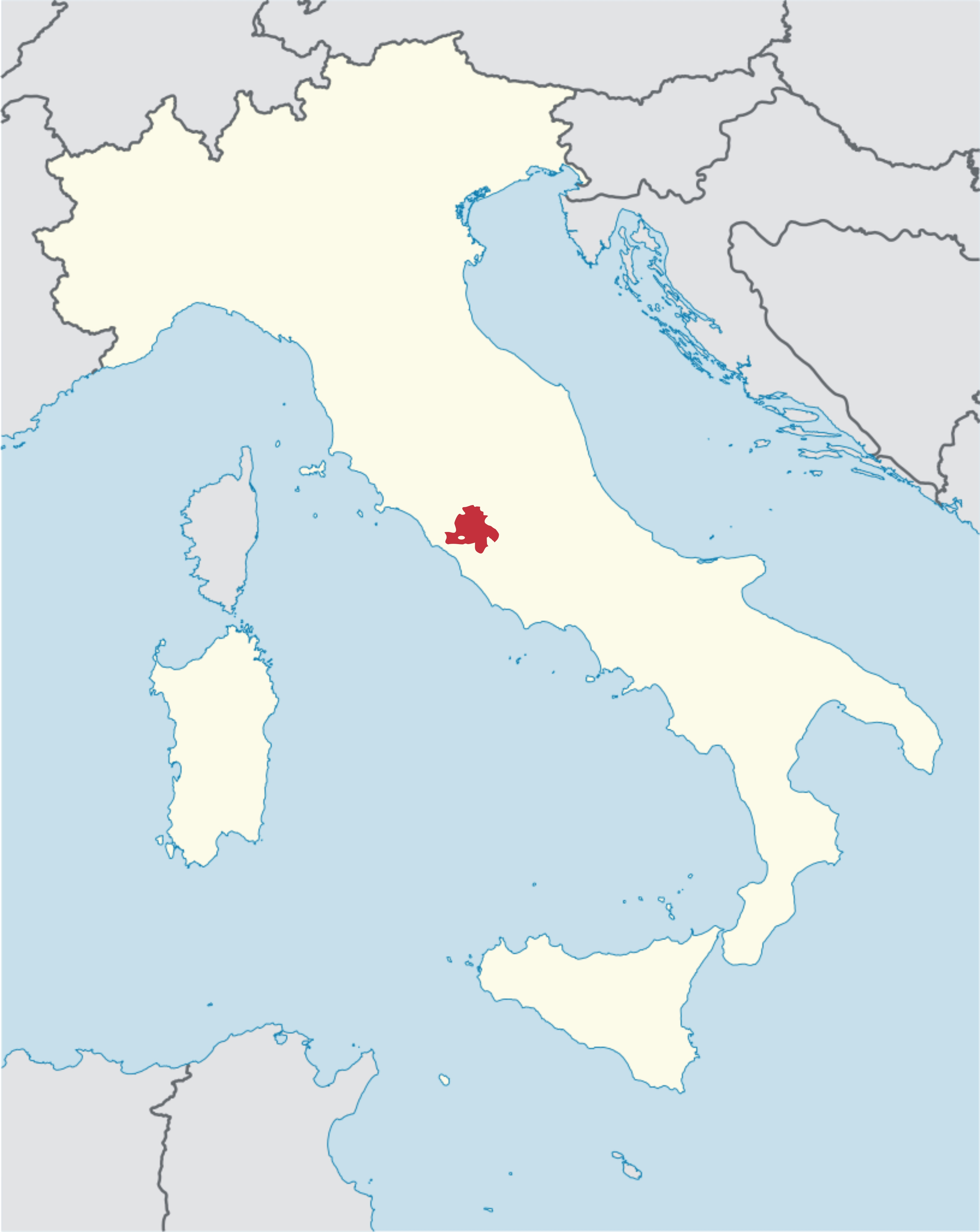
Currently part of Diocese of Civita Castellana.

The diocese of Nepi-Sutri was a Roman Catholic ecclesiastical territory in central Italy, created in 1435 by unifying the diocese of Nepi and the diocese of Sutri under a single bishop. It existed until 1986, when it was united into the current diocese of Cività Castellana.

== History ==
The traditional tale of the Church of Nepi states that it was first Christianized by Ptolemaeus, who, it is claimed, was a disciple of the Apostles. This narrative was endorsed by Pope Paul III in a papal bull of 8 January 1542. This town has an ancient Christian cemetery. In it was found the remains of Romanus of Caesarea, who is the patron of the city; the cathedral possesses a statue of him by Gian Lorenzo Bernini. The names of the pair from Nepi are found in no martyrology; they are Roman martyrs. Among the martyrs of Sutri is St. Felix (about 275).

In 419, Eulalius, a competitor of Pope Boniface I for the papacy, was made Bishop of Nepi. The first bishop of known date was Eusebius (465).

Bishop Paulus of Nepi was sent as Visitator to Naples by Pope Gregory I, from 591 to 593.

=== Lombard, Carolingian, Ottonian ===
In the Gothic War, Nepi was one of the last strongholds of the Goths. The town was sacked by the Lombards in 569. In the eighth century, however, it became the seat of Toto (Theodore), who had been invested dux Nepsinae civitatis by the Lombard king Desiderius (756–774). In 767, he plotted the murder of Pope Paul I but was dissuaded. When Paul died on 28 June 767, though, Toto had his brother Constantine acclaimed as pope. A counter-revolution against the brothers on 30 July 768 resulted in the death of Tuto and the deposition, imprisonment, and mutilation of Constantine.

In 817, in the Pactum Hludowicianum between the Emperor Louis the Pious and Pope Paschal I, the towns of Nepi and Sutri are specifically mentioned as being part of the old Duchy of Rome, and are acknowledged as being the property of the Church. That privilegium, granted by Louis the Pious, was confirmed in exactly the same terms by the Emperor Otto I on 13 February 962.

Bishop Stephanus of Nepi, Bishop Donatus of Ostia, and the deacon Marinus, in 868, were named papal legates and presidents of the Council of Constantinople, in the matter of the alleged heresy of Photios I of Constantinople. The first session of the Council took place on 5 October 869. The legation finally returned to Rome in 871.

In 993, Bishop Joannes of Nepi was serving as bibliothecarius S.R.E. in the papal court of Pope John XV (985–996), and served as datary.

Bishop Martinus of Nepi and Bishop Joannes of Sutri both attended the Third Lateran Council of Pope Alexander III in March 1179.

=== Guelfs and Ghibbelines ===
In the struggle between the emperors and the popes, Nepi was imperialist during the reigns of Pope Alexander II, Pope Nicholas II, Pope Gregory VII, and Pope Innocent II. In the schism which began in 1130, Nepi supported Pope Anacletus II (1130–1138) against the imperially supported Innocent II, who had been driven out of Rome. An inscription of 1131 in the cathedral at Nepi confirms the determination of the citizens to go to war if necessary to defend their choice. On the other hand, in 1160, it fought against the commune of Rome, and in 1244, was besieged by Emperor Frederick II. A feudal possession, first of the prefects of Vico, and then of the Orsinis, of the Colonnas, and of Cesare Borgia, from 1537 to 1545, it was erected into a duchy in favour of Pier Luigi Farnese; and when the latter was transferred to Parma, Nepi returned to immediate dependence on the Holy See. In 1798 the French set fire to the cathedral and to the episcopal palace, and archives were lost.

Sutri is placed on the Cassian Way. The cathedral is of the thirteenth century, modernized by frequent alterations. Santa Maria della Grotta is an interesting church. The history of Sutri in antiquity resembles that of Nepi. In 537, the imperial general Belisarius "...ordered Bessas to take over Narni, a very strong city in Tuscany.... Bessas took Narni not at all against the will of the inhabitants, and Konstantinos won over Spoleto and Perugia and some other towns without trouble.... But while Bessas was making his dispositions in Narni in a more leisurely manner, it so happened that, as the enemy {Goths] were passing that way, the plains in the outskirts of the city were filled with Goths. These were an advance guard preceding the rest of the army. Bessas engaged with them and unexpectedly routed those whom he encountered and killed many. But then, as he was pushed back by their superior numbers, he retired to Narni." for Sutri also was taken by the Lombards in 569, but was retaken by the exarch Romanus; Liutprand likewise took the town in 726, but in the following year restored it to "St. Peter". As the city is on the Cassian Way not far from Rome, it was, as a rule, the last halting-place of the German emperors on their way to the city, and sometimes they received there the papal legate.

Other bishops were Martinus, or Marinus, who was sent as ambassador to Otho I in 963; Benedictus, who, in 975, became Pope Benedict VII; Bishop Bonitho (Bonizo), historian of the Gregorian epoch, who was driven from his diocese by the anti-papal faction and later was made Bishop of Piacenza.

==== The Synod of Sutri ====
The Synod of Sutri was held on 20 December 1046, by the Emperor Henry III. The major purpose of his journey through Sutri was to visit Rome, where he expected to be crowned emperor by the pope. His principal problem was that there were three claimants to the papal office, and charges of simony were rife. Benedict IX was the brother of the Count of Tusculum, and had certainly been made pope through simony; he was driven out by the Romans in 1044, but never formally deposed. His replacement, John of Sabina, called Silvester III, was an adherent of the Theophylact party, and was at least accused of simony, and was excommunicated by Boniface IX. Then, on 1 May 1045, Benedict wrote out a deed of abdication in favor of his godfather, John Gratian, who became Gregory VI in what may have been a simoniacal transaction; a form of election was later carried out in Rome. But at the synod in Sutri, Gregory admitted his culpability, and is even said to have deposed himself: "I, Gregory, bishop, servant of the servants of God, do hereby adjudge myself to be removed from the pontificate of the Holy Roman Church, because of the enormous error which by simoniacal impurity has crept into and vitiated my election." (quoted by Schaff)

Another synod was held in Sutri in January 1059. Pope Nicholas II, who had just been elected pope in Siena, was on his way to Rome. In Sutri, he and numerous bishops from Lombardy and Tuscany deposed the current pope, Benedict X, on charges of perjury and schism.

In August 1110, the German Emperor Henry V crossed the Alps with 30,000 troops, intending to reassert his authority over his Italian vassals who had drifted away; he then intended to settle matters with the pope and have himself crowned in Rome. The city of Novara in Piedmont resisted his demands for submission, and he destroyed it. Arezzo also resisted, and was sacked. Countess Matilda of Tuscany submitted and acknowledged his sovereignty. At Sutri, on 4 February 1111, he met the delegates of Pope Paschal II, led by Petrus Leoni. Leoni's brief was to persuade the emperor to renounce his rights to lay investiture of clerics. Henry was not going to Rome to surrender, but he was open to compromise. An agreement was reached and published by the pope on 12 February, after oaths had been sworn on both sides. The emperor agreed to abandon the practice of lay investiture, and the pope agreed to get the bishops to hand back the regalian lands to the emperor. The ceremony of Henry's coronation was aborted, however, when disorders arose from the bishops who were being dispossessed of a substantial part of their lands, income, and power.

=== Union of dioceses ===
Due to the limited financial resources of both dioceses, the diocese of Sutri was united to Nepi by Pope Eugenius IV, aeque personaliter, under Bishop Luca de Tartaris, in the Bull "Romana Ecclesia" of 12 December 1435. One bishop wa to be the bishop of Nepi and of Sutri at the same time; their diocesan structure was unchanged. The bishop was to perform ordinations alternately in Nepi and in Sutri, he was to consecrate the holy oils alternately, and when a vacancy occurred, the two cathedral Chapters were to meet together alternately in Sutri and Nepi.

Diocesan synods were held for Nepi e Sutri in 1671 (in Sutri), in 1742 (in Nepi), in 1762, and in 1795.

Under Pomponius Cesi (1519), who became a cardinal, the cemetery of S. Savinilla was discovered. Antonio Michael Ghislieri, who was bishop for six months in 1556–1557, became Pope Pius V. Bishop Joseph Chianti (1701) founded the seminary. Camillus Simeoni (1782) was exiled by the French, and after their defeat and expulsion from the Papal States, became a cardinal.

As the army of the new French Republic were invading Italy to attack Naples, they passed through the diocese of Cività Castellana. The local militia of Sutri attempted to block the vanguard, but were defeated. In retaliation, the French sacked Sutri, and set fire to the cathedral, the episcopal palace, and the chancellery. Rebuilding did not begin until after the return of Pope Pius VII from French exile.

== Bishops ==
=== Diocese of Nepi ===
Erected: 1st Century
Latin Name: Nepesinus

==== to 1200 ====
...

- Projectitius (c. 465)
- Felix (494–495)
- Paulus (591, 595)
- Celsius
- Gratiosus (c. 649)
- Theodorus (c. 680)
- Georgius ((c. 721)
- Joannes (c. 743–c. 764)
- Fotone (c. 769)
- Innocentius
- Gratiosus (II) (826)
- Benedictus (855)
- Andreas (861)
- Stephanus (c. 878–896)

...

- Sergius (c. 945– after 955)
- Joannes (963–993?)
- Crescentius (c. 1015)
- Rainerius (c. 1024–1027)
- Crescentius (c. 1042)

○ [ Albertus (1098) ] Intrusus

- Offo (c. 1099}
- Benedictus (attested 1126)
- Raynaldus (c. 1141)
- Humbertus (c. 1150)
- Martinus (c. 1179)
- Bernardus (c. 1186)

==== From 1200 to 1435 ====
- Gerardus (c. 1206–1210)
- Petrus
- Ignotus
- Amatus
- Guilelmus
- Laurentius
- Thomas, O.Min. (1278–1285)
- Lituardus
- Angelus, O.Min.
- Paulus , O.Min.
- Joannes, O.Min. (1327–1321)
- Gentilis, O.P. (1321–1337)
- Jacobus
- Bonifacius, O.Min. (1358–1391)
- Lucas de Contaguerra, O.P. (1379– ? ), Avignon Obedience

Petrus Scaglia, O.P. (1391–1393), Administrator

- Sanctus (1393–1396), Roman Obedience
- Petrus (1396–1400), Roman Obedience
- Jacobus (1400), Roman Obedience
- Franciscus (1400–1433), Roman Obedience
- Pietro Dell'Orto (27 Apr 1433 – 12 Dec 1435 Appointed, Bishop of Corneto (Tarquinia) e Montefiascone)

=== Diocese of Sutri ===
==== Bishops of Sutri, to 1200 ====
...

- Eusebius (465)
- Constantius (c. 487 - after 495 ?)
- Mercurius (c. 495 ? - after 502)
- [ Agnellus (I) (c. 593) ]
- Barbatus (c. 649)
- Gratiosus (I) (c. 680)
- Agnellus (II) (c. 721)
- Gratiosus (II) (c. 743)
- Agatho (c. 769)
- Valerianus (c. 826)
- Joannes (I) (853 - after 861)
- Bonifacio dei conti di Tuscolo (c. 882)
- Niccolò (c. 904)
- Marinus (c. 963 - after 969)
- Benedict dei conti di Tuscolo (? - October 974
- Dominicus (I) (c. 1001 - after January 1015)
- Petrus (c. January 1017)
- Dominicus (II) (c. 1027)
- Ignotus (c. April 1049)
- Kilinus (or Azelino) (c. 1050)
- Rolandus (c. 1059)
- Joannes (II) (c. 1065 - after 1068)
- Mainardus (c. 1070)
- Bonizo (c. 1078 - 1082 ?)
- Gennaro ? (c. 1090)
- Albericus (c. 1105 - after 1112)
- Otto (c. 1126 - circa 1138)
- Joannes (III) (1137 - ?)
- G. (c. 1158)
- Adalbertus (c. 1170)
- Joannes (IV) (c. 1179)
- Radulfus (c. 1194 - after September 1198 deposed)

==== From 1200 to 1435 ====
- Petrus Ismaeli (1200 - after 1230)
- Ignotus (c. 1239)
- Ignotus (c. 1251)
- Moricus (or Menco or Moruccio) (c. 1253 - 1275)
- Franciscus (1275 - ?)
- Ildiprandino, O.P. (c. 5 January 1277)
- Florasius, O.F.M. (1279 - 1282)
- Aldobrandus (1283 - 1290)
- Giacomo (1290 - 1325?)
- Tommaso, O.P. (7 June 1325 - 1333)

[ Berengario di Saint-Affrique (1328-1333 ])

- Uguccione di Perugia, O.F.M. (19 March 1333 - circa 1340)
- Giovanni (V) (20 March 1340 - ? )
- Giovanni Vergoni, O.E.S.A. (19 July 1342 - 1348)
- Ugolino da Pietralunga, O.P. (23 June 1348 - January 1353)
- Nicola (13 February 1353 - ? )
- Pietro Velli, O.F.M. (12 October 1360 - 1363)
- Angelo da Vetralla (5 June 1364 - 1376? )
- Domenico (III) (25 January 1377 - ? )

Pietro Cenci (1 May 1384 - ?) bishop-elect

- Bernardo di Roma (? - 1406)
- Andrea (1406 - 1410)
- Domenico d'Anglona, O.Cist. (1411 - 1429)

[ Andrea Crisoberga, O.P. (28 febbraio 1429 - 1430) bishop-elect ]

- Luca Rossi de' Tartarinis (13 novembre 1430 - 1435)

=== Diocese of Nepi e Sutri ===
United: 12 December 1435 with Diocese of Sutri
Immediately Subject to the Holy See

==== From 1435 to 1603 ====
- Luca Rubens de Tartaris (1435 –1447)
- Giacomo Cordoni (1447–1453)
- Angelo Altieri (30 Apr 1453 – 1472 Died)
- Baptista Pontinus de Marsi (1473–1484)
- Andreas Poltroni (1484–1489)
- Bartolomeo Flores (21 Aug 1489 – 5 Aug 1495 Appointed, Archbishop of Cosenza)
- Antonio Torres (17 Apr 1497 – Jun 1497 Died)
- Antonio Alberici (1503–1506)
- Gian Giacomo Bruni (6 Feb 1506 – 1507 Resigned)
- Paolo Emilio Bruni (27 Aug 1507 – 1516 Died)
- Giacomo Bongalli (5 Nov 1516 – 1538 Resigned)
- Giacomo Simonetta (6 Feb 1538 – 1 Nov 1539 Died)
- Pomponio Cecci (Cesi) (24 Nov 1539 – 4 Aug 1542 Died)
- Pietro Antonio de Angelis (7 Aug 1542 – 1553 Died)
- Antonio Simeoni (3 Jul 1553 – 2 Sep 1556 Died)
- Antonio Ghislieri (4 Sep 1556 – 27 Mar 1560 Appointed, Bishop of Mondovi)
- Girolamo Gallarati (27 Mar 1560 – 9 Jun 1564 Appointed, Bishop of Alessandria (della Paglia))
- Tiberio Crispo (19 Jan 1565 – 6 Oct 1566 Died)
- Egidio Valenti (25 Oct 1566 – 9 May 1568 Died)
- Camillo Campeggi (14 May 1568 – 1569 Died)
- Donato Stampa (14 Dec 1569 – 1575 Died)
- Alessio Stradella (20 Jul 1575 – 27 Aug 1580 Died)
- Orazio Moroni (5 Sep 1580 – 30 May 1603 Died)

==== From 1604 to 1986 ====
- Taddeo Sarti (31 May 1604 – 1616)
- Dionisio Martini, O.F.M.Obs. (1616 – 1627)
- Sebastiano De Paoli (Sep 1627 – 17 Feb 1643 Died)
- Bartolomeo Vannini (13 Jul 1643 – 1653 Died)
- Marcello Anania (1654 – 25 Apr 1670 Died)
- Giulio Spinola (2 Jun 1670 – 1677)
- Giacomo Buoni (28 Feb 1678 – 1679 Died)
- Stefano Ricciardi (1 Sep 1681 – 1683 Died)
- Francesco Juste Giusti (1685–1693)
- Savo Millini (Mellini) (1694–1701)
- Giuseppe Cianti (14 Mar 1701 – Nov 1708 Died)
- Vincenzo Vecchiarelli (15 Apr 1709 – 24 Jan 1740 Died)
- Francesco Vivani (1740–1746)
- Giacinto Silvestri (1746–1754)
- Filippo Mornati (1754–1778)
- Girolamo Luigi Crivelli (1778–1780)
- Camillo de Simeoni (1782–1818)
- Anselmo Basilici (1818–1840)
- Francesco Spalletti (1840–1850)
- Gaspare Pitocchi (Petocchi) (1850–1855)
- Lorenzo Signani (28 Sep 1855 – 2 Sep 1863 Died)
- Giulio Lenti (1867–1876
- Giovanni Battista Paolucci (1876–1878)
- Giuseppe Maria Costantini (Constantini) (15 Jul 1878 – 1 Jun 1891 Resigned)
- Generoso Mattei (1891–1900)
- Bernardo Giuseppe Doebbing, O.F.M. (2 Apr 1900 – 14 Mar 1916 Died)
- Luigi Olivares (1916–1943)
- Giuseppe Gori (1943–1969)
- Marcello Rosina (10 Aug 1974 – 11 Feb 1986 Appointed, Bishop of Civita Castellana (Orte, Gallese, Nepi e Sutri))

=== Titular (arch-)bishops of Nepi ===
- Felipe Bacarreza Rodriguez (1991–2006)
- Benedetto Tuzia (2006-2012)
- René Leigue Cesari (2012-2022)
- Walter Erbì, titular Archbishop (16 July 2022 – ...)

=== Titular (arch-)bishops of Sutri ===
- Christoph Schönborn, O.P. (1991–1995)
- Paolo Sardi (1996-2010), Archbishop
- Antonio Guido Filipazzi (2011 - )

== Sources ==
=== Episcopal lists ===
- Eubel, Conradus, ed. (1913). Hierarchia catholica (in Latin). Vol. 1 (Tomus 1) (second ed.). Münster: Libreria Regensbergiana. p. 363.Archived.
- Eubel, Conradus, ed. (1914). Hierarchia catholica (in Latin). Vol. 2 (Tomus 2) (second ed.). Münster: Libreria Regensbergiana. p. 188.. Archived.
- Eubel, Conradus, ed. (1923). Hierarchia catholica (in Latin). Vol. 3 (Tomus 3) (second ed.). Münster: Libreria Regensbergiana. p. 240.. Archived.
- Gauchat, Patritius (Patrice) (1935). Hierarchia catholica. Vol. Tomus IV (1592-1667). Münster: Libraria Regensbergiana.
- Ritzler, Remigius; Sefrin, Pirminus (1952). Hierarchia catholica medii et recentis aevi. Vol. Tomus V (1667-1730). Patavii: Messagero di S. Antonio.
- Ritzler, Remigius; Sefrin, Pirminus (1958). Hierarchia catholica medii et recentis aevi. Vol. Tomus VI (1730-1799). Patavii: Messagero di S. Antonio.
- Ritzler, Remigius; Sefrin, Pirminus (1968). Hierarchia Catholica medii et recentioris aevi (in Latin). Vol. VII (1800–1846). Monasterii: Libreria Regensburgiana.
- Remigius Ritzler; Pirminus Sefrin (1978). Hierarchia catholica Medii et recentioris aevi (in Latin). Vol. VIII (1846–1903). Il Messaggero di S. Antonio.
- Pięta, Zenon (2002). Hierarchia catholica medii et recentioris aevi (in Latin). Vol. IX (1903–1922). Padua: Messagero di San Antonio. ISBN 978-88-250-1000-8.

=== Studies ===
- Bondi da Fiumalbo, Paolo (1836). Memorie storiche sulla città Sabozia ora lago Sabatino... e saggio storico sull'antichissima città di Sutri.. (in Italian). Firenze: Calasanziana 1836.
- Brancaleoni, Giuseppe Ranghiasci (1845). Memorie o siano relazioni istoriche sull'origine, nome, fasti e progressi dell'antichissima città di Nepi gia' territorio falisco e capitale della Pentapoli di Toscana. (in Italian). Todi: Rafaello Scalabrini 1845.
- Cappelletti, Giuseppe (1846). Le chiese d'Italia della loro origine sino ai nostri giorni (in Italian). Vol. sesto (6). Venezia: G. Antonelli. pp. 195–223, 224–270.
- De Waal, A. (1902). "Eine bischöfliche Grabschrift aus Nepi." (in German and Latin). In: Römische Quartalschrift Vol. 16 (1902, pp. 61-64.
- Kehr, Paul Fridolin (1907). Italia pontificia. vol. II: Latium. Berlin 1909. pp. 176–182. (in Latin)
- Lanzoni, Francesco (1927), Le diocesi d'Italia dalle origini al principio del secolo VII (an. 604). (in Italian). Faenza: F. Lega 1927, pp. 258–259; 263-265.
- Nispi-Landi, Ciro (1887). Storia dell'antichissima città di Sutri. (in Italian). Rome: Desiderj-Ferretti 1887.
- Schwartz, Gerhard (1913), Die Besetzung der Bistümer Reichsitaliens unter den sächsischen und salischen Kaisern : mit den Listen der Bischöfe, 951-1122, Leipzig-Berlin 1913, p. 263-265. (in German)
- Strafforello, Gustavo (1894) La Patria: Geografia d'Italia. (in Italian). Vol. VIII: Provincia di Roma. Torino: Unione Tipografia Editrice 1894. Nepi: pp. 634-638. Sutri: pp. 656-659.
- Tomassetti, G. (1882). "Della Campagna Romana nel Medio Evo, (continuazione)," (in Italian), in: Archivio della Società romana di storia patria, Vol. 5 (Roma 1882), pp. 590-653.
- Ughelli, Ferdinando; Coleti, Niccolò (1717). Italia sacra sive De Episcopis Italiae, et insularum adjacentium (in Latin). Vol. Tomus primus (1) (editio secunda, aucta et emendata ed.). Venice: apud Sebastianum Coleti. pp. 1023–1035. Sutri: pp. 1273-1278.
- Venditelli, Marco. "Sutri nel medioevo (secoli X-XIV)". (in Italian) In: M. Venditelli (ed.), Sutri nel medioevo. Storia, insediamento urbano, e territorio (secoli X-XIV) (Roma: Viella 2008), pp. 1–92.

==== External links ====
- New Advent
