= Diocese of Cerignola-Ascoli Satriano =

Latin Catholic diocese in Italy

Coordinates: 41.2667°N 15.9000°E

Diocese of Cerignola-Ascoli Satriano Dioecesis Ceriniolensis-Asculana Apuliae

Catholic
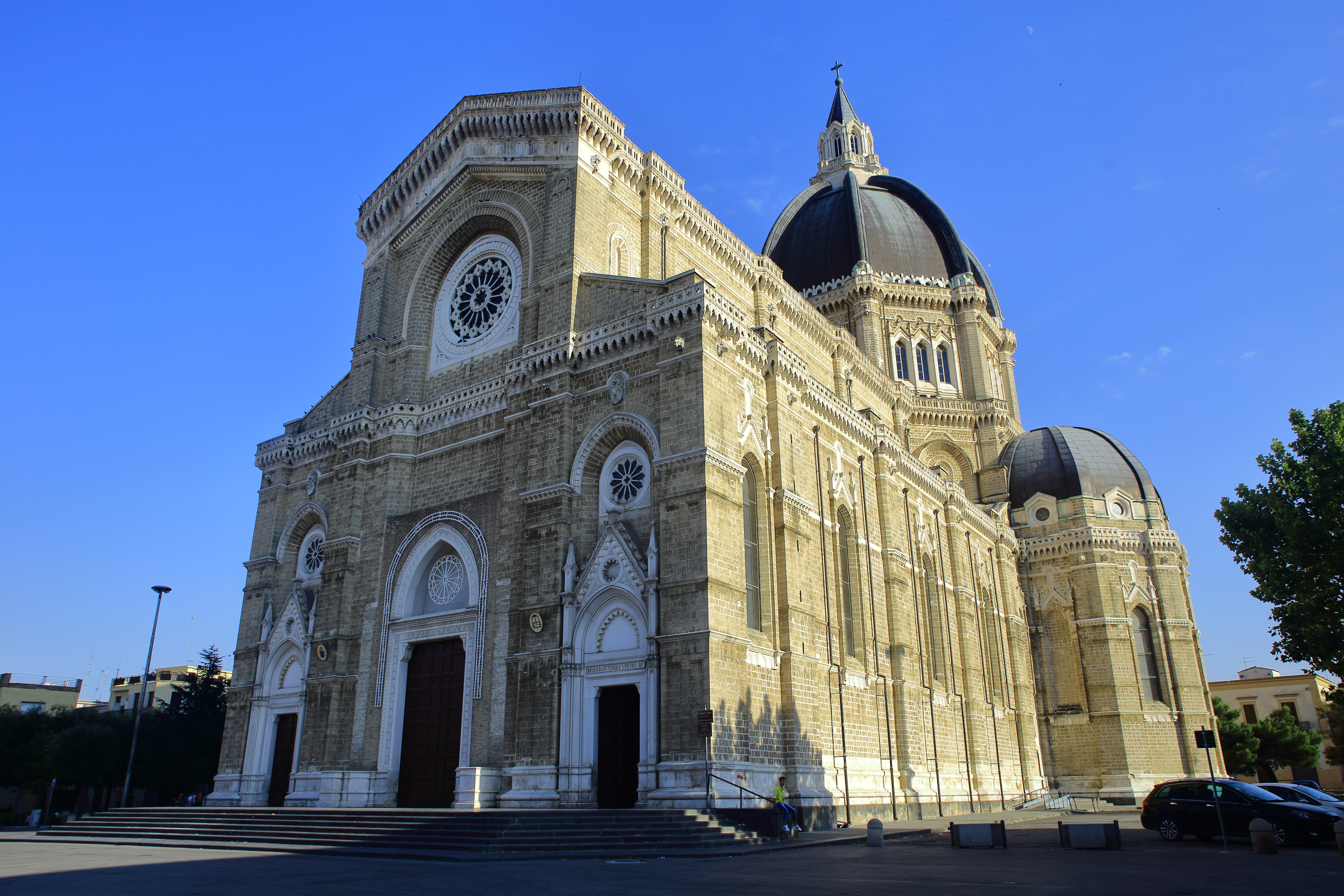
- Cerignola, Cathedral-Basilica of S. Pietro

Location
- Country: Italy
- Ecclesiastical province: Foggia-Bovino

Statistics
- Area: 1,327 km^{2} (512 sq mi)
- Population: Total; Catholics: (as of 2023); 108,816 ▲; 102,749 ▲ (95.4%)
- Parishes: 34 ▼

Information
- Denomination: Catholic Church
- Sui iuris church: Latin Church
- Rite: Roman Rite
- Established: 11th Century
- Cathedral: Cattedrale di S. Pietro Apostolo (Cerignola)
- Co-cathedral: Concattedrale della Natività della Beata V. Maria (Ascoli Satriano)
- Secular priests: 39 (diocesan) ▼14 (religious orders) ▼12 Permanent Deacons ▼

Current leadership
- Pope: Leo XIV
- Bishop: Fabio Ciollaro
- Bishops emeritus: Felice di Molfetta

Map
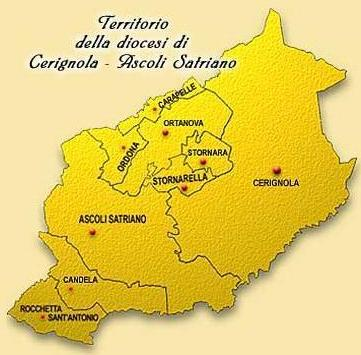

Website
- Diocese of Cerignola-Ascoli Satriano (in Italian)

The Diocese of Cerignola-Ascoli Satriano (Latin: Dioecesis Ceriniolensis-Asculana Apuliae) is a Latin Church diocese of the Catholic Church in Apulia. It has existed under this name since 1986. Its bishop has been a suffragan of the Archbishop of Foggia-Bovino since 1979.

Historically the Diocese of Ascoli Satriano was a suffragan of the Archdiocese of Benevento. In 1819, the diocese of Cerignola was established, and one and the same bishop held both dioceses, with the name Diocese of Ascoli Satriano e Cerignola.

== History ==
=== Ascoli ===
The town of Ascoli was captured by Norman adventurers in March 1041. At the council of Melfi in 1043, William d'Hauteville, called William Iron Arm, became the lord of Ascoli.

In 969, Ausculum Appulum (now Ascoli Satriano) appears as a city amongst the suffragan sees of Beneventum. It is listed as a suffragan of Benevento in the "Rationes decimarum" of 1310. A bishop of Ascoli, deposed in 1068 by Pope Alexander II, is sometimes adduced, but he was a bishop of Ascoli Piceno, not Ascoli Satriano. The first known bishop of Ascoli, however, is Risando, who consented to a donation to the monastery of Cava in 1107.

==== Ascoli: Chapter and cathedral ====
The medieval cathedral of Ascoli, which had been (re)built by King Roger of Sicily in 1111, was destroyed by the great earthquake of 1456, which also destroyed the citadel.

The successor cathedral building was dedicated to the Virgin Mary and to S. Leo of Ordona. Giacomo Leoncavallo dates this Leo to 105, making him the successor of the Greek Photinus, who had been sent by the Apostle Peter to evangelize Ordona, the diocese from which Ascoli allegedly descended after the town of Ordona was completely destroyed. The cathedral was administered by a corporation called the Chapter, composed of six dignities (the Archdeacon, the Archpriest, the Cantor, two Primicerii, and the Treasurer) and seven canons (later fourteen). In 1680, the city of Ascoli had a population of about 2,000 persons. In 1737, the population was 3,000. The Chapter consisted of six dignities and fourteen canons.

=== Cerignola ===
The fief of Cerignola fell to the royal treasury under Charles I of Sicily, in 1273, on the death of Simon the chancellor. In 1283, Bertrando Artus sold it to Ugone de Vicini, who in his turn sold it to Giovanni Pipino of Barletta, whose family still possessed the fief in 1320. In 1348, the Lord of Cerignano was Giacomo Arucci, whom Queen Joanna I of Naples appointed grand chamberlain. In 1398, Benedetto Azzaroli, a native of Cerignola and the Vicegerens in Apulia, purchased the castle of Cerignoli, and the king assigned him the territory as well. In 1417, the fief returned to the treasury, and Queen Joanna II of Naples sold it to Giovanni Caracciolo. In 1583, his descendant Caterina Caracciolo brought it as a dowry to Ettore Pignatelli. One or another branch of the Pignatelli family held the property until the mid-19th century, when feudalism was abolished.

It has been suggested that Cerignola, on account of its relative importance, may have been formerly a diocese, but there is no evidence on the point. Since at least the 15th century, Cerignola has been outside the diocesan system (nullius diocesis), governed ecclesiastically by the archpriest of the collegiate church of S. Pietro in Carignola. The archpriest was a prelate, but not a bishop, and did not have the right to ordain or consecrate. From 1255, the archpriest and his five canons swore an oath to the archbishop of Bari and Canosa. The capitular church of Cerinola was subject to the jurisdiction of the Provost of Canosa. In a document of 30 April 1455, Pope Calixtus III uses the expression “Cidonola nullius dioc.” with reference to Cerignola.

Cerignola (Dioecesis Ceriniolensis-Asculana Apuliae) was established as a diocese on 18 June 1819, by Pope Pius VII, in the bull "Quamquam Per Nuperrimam". The pope was frank in his motives: increasing difficulties in financing the diocese of Ascoli, and the greater population and wealth of Cerignola. Cerignola was to have one and only one bishop, who was to have all the rights of a bishop, including the power to summon a synod and require the attendance of all abbots and inferior prelates in his jurisdiction. His diocese was to be a suffragan of the archdiocese of Benevento. The dioceses of Cerignola and Ascoli were to be united under one bishop, aeque personaliter, so that neither diocese was to be subject to the other. The bishop who was appointed to both Cerignano and to Ascoli was authorized to appoint a separate Vicar General in each of his dioceses, and, when the bishopric became vacant, each cathedral Chapter was authorized to elect its own Vicar Capitular during the vacancy.

The name Carinola (Carinolensis seu Calinensis) was established in 1968 as a titular see. Cerignola in Apulia has no connection with Carinola, a comune (municipality) in the Province of Caserta in the region of Campania in Italy.

=== Diocesan synods ===
A diocesan synod was an irregularly held, but important, meeting of the bishop of a diocese and his clergy. Its purpose was (1) to proclaim generally the various decrees already issued by the bishop; (2) to discuss and ratify measures on which the bishop chose to consult with his clergy; (3) to publish statutes and decrees of the diocesan synod, of the provincial synod, and of the Holy See.

Bishop Francesco Antonio Punzi (1685–1728) held a diocesan synod in Ascoli on 26–28 October 1692. Bishop Antonio Maria Nappi (1818–1830) presided over a diocesan synod held in Ascoli on 21–23 June 1824. Bishop Nappi then held a diocesan synod for the diocese of Cerinola in the cathedral of Cerinola from 30 June to 2 July 1824. Bishop Leonardo Todisco Grande (1849–1872) presided over a diocesan synod on 10–12 April 1853. Bishop Antonio Sena presided over a diocesan synod in the cathedral at Ascoli on 25–27 June 1878.

=== Change of metropolitan ===
On 30 April 1979, the diocese of Foggia was promoted, to become the Metropolitan Archdiocese of Foggia (Latin Name: Fodiana-Bovinensis). It was assigned as suffragan dioceses: Siponto, Troia, Asculum et Cerinola, Bovino, Lucera, and S. Severo. Asculum e Cerinola had up to that point been suffragans of the archdiocese of Benevento.

=== Consolidation of 1986 ===
The Second Vatican Council (1962–1965), in order to ensure that all Catholics received proper spiritual attention, decreed the reorganization of the diocesan structure of Italy and the consolidation of small and struggling dioceses.

On 18 February 1984, the Vatican and the Italian State signed a new and revised concordat. Based on the revisions, a set of Normae was issued on 15 November 1984, which was accompanied in the next year, on 3 June 1985, by enabling legislation. According to the agreement, the practice of having one bishop govern two separate dioceses at the same time, aeque personaliter, was abolished. Instead, the Vatican continued consultations which had begun under Pope John XXIII for the merging of small dioceses, especially those with personnel and financial problems, into one combined diocese.

On 30 September 1986, Pope John Paul II ordered that the dioceses of Ascoli Apuliae e Cerignola be merged into one diocese with one bishop, with the Latin title Dioecesis Ceriniolensis-Asculana Apuliae. The seat of the diocese was to be in Cerignola, and the cathedral of Cerignola was to serve as the cathedral of the merged dioceses. The cathedral in Ascolana was to become a co-cathedral, and the cathedral Chapter was to be a Capitulum Concathedralis. There was to be only one diocesan Tribunal, in Cerignola, and likewise one seminary, one College of Consultors, and one Priests' Council. The territory of the new diocese was to include the territory of the former diocese of Ascolana.

== Bishops ==
=== Diocese of Ascoli Satriano ===
Erected: 11th century

...
[Maurus (1059)]
...
[Joannes (1092)]
...

- Risando (attested 1107)

...

- Sikenolfus (attested 1123)

...

- Joannes (attested 1179)

...

- Goffridus (attested 1189 – 1200)

...

- Petrus (attested 1205 – 1224)

...

- Angelo (1308-1311)
- Franciscus (1311)
- Franciscus (1311 – ? )
- Petrus ( ? – 1353)
- Petrus Pironti (1354 – ? )
- Petrus ( ? - 1396)
- Pascharellus, O.E.S.A. (attested 1397 – 1418) Roman Obedience
- Giacomo (1419 – 1458)
- Giovanni Antonio Buccarelli (1458 – 1469)
- Pietro Luca, O.P. (1469 – 1477)
- Fazio Gallerani (1477 – 1479)
- Giosuè de Gaeta (1480 – 1509 Resigned)
- Agapito de Gaeta (23 May 1509 – 1512 Died)
- Giosuè de Gaeta (18 May 1513 – 1517 Resigned)
- Giovanni Francisco de Gaeta (1 Apr 1517 – 10 Nov 1566 Died)
- Marco Landi (22 Aug 1567 – 1593 Died)
- Francesco Bonfiglio, O.F.M. Conv. (31 May 1593 – 1603 Died)
- Ferdinando D'Avila, O.F.M. (9 Mar 1594 – 1620 Died)
- Francesco Maria della Marra (29 Apr 1620 – 1625 Died)
- Francesco Andrea Gelsomini, O.E.S.A. (9 Jun 1625 – 8 Dec 1629 Died)
- Giorgio Bolognetti (23 Sep 1630 – 28 Feb 1639 Appointed, Bishop of Rieti)
- Michael Rezzi (Resti) (8 Aug 1639 – Mar 1648 Died)
- Pirro Luigi Castellomata (23 Nov 1648 – Oct 1656 Died)
- Giacomo Filippo Bescapè (28 May 1657 – 13 Aug 1672 Died)
- Felice Via (1672 – 1679)
- Filippo Lenti (1680 – 1684)
- Francesco Antonio Punzi (1685 – 1728)
- Francesco Antonio de Martini (1728 – 1737)
- Giuseppe Campanile (1737 – 1771)
- Emanuele di Tommaso (1771 – 1807)

Sede vacante (1807 – 1818)

=== Diocese of Ascoli Satriano e Cerignola ===
Union of the two dioceses, «aeque personaliter»: 14 June 1819

- Antonio Maria Nappi (1818–1830)
- Francesco Iavarone (1832–1849)
- Leonardo Todisco Grande (1849–1872)
- Antonio Sena (1872–1887)
- Domenico Cocchia, O.F.M. Cap. (23 May 1887 – 18 Nov 1900 Died)
- Angelo Struffolini, D.C. (15 Apr 1901 – 1 Jul 1914 Resigned)
- Giovanni Sodo (1915–1930)
- Vittorio Consigliere, O.F.M. Cap. (1931–1946)
- Donato Pafundi (1946–1957)
- Mario Di Lieto (1957–1987 Retired)

=== Diocese of Cerignola-Ascoli Satriano ===
- Vincenzo D'Addario (1987–1990)
- Giovanni Battista Pichierri (1990–1999)
- Felice di Molfetta (2000–2015 Retired)
- Luigi Renna (2015–2022)
- Fabio Ciollaro (2022– )

== Bibliography ==
=== Reference works ===
- Gams, Pius Bonifatius (1873). Series episcoporum Ecclesiae catholicae (in Latin). Ratisbon: Typis et Sumptibus Georgii Josephi Manz. pp. 853.
- Eubel, Conradus, ed. (1913). Hierarchia catholica (in Latin). Vol. I (second ed.). Münster: Libreria Regensbergiana.
- Eubel, Conradus, ed. (1914). Hierarchia catholica (in Latin). Vol. II (second ed.). Münster: Libreria Regensbergiana.
- Eubel, Conradus; Gulik, Guilelmus (1923). Hierarchia catholica (in Latin). Vol. III (second ed.). Münster: Libreria Regensbergiana.
- Gauchat, Patritius (Patrice) (1935). Hierarchia catholica (in Latin). Vol. IV (1592-1667). Münster: Libraria Regensbergiana.
- Ritzler, Remigius; Sefrin, Pirminus (1952). Hierarchia catholica medii et recentis aevi (in Latin). Vol. V (1667-1730). Patavii: Messagero di S. Antonio.
- Ritzler, Remigius; Sefrin, Pirminus (1958). Hierarchia catholica medii et recentis aevi (in Latin). Vol. VI (1730-1799). Patavii: Messagero di S. Antonio.
- Ritzler, Remigius; Sefrin, Pirminus (1968). Hierarchia Catholica medii et recentioris aevi... (in Latin). Vol. VII (1800–1846). Monasterii: Libr. Regensburgiana.
- Remigius Ritzler; Pirminus Sefrin (1978). Hierarchia catholica Medii et recentioris aevi (in Latin). Vol. VIII (1846–1903). Il Messaggero di S. Antonio.
- Pięta, Zenon (2002). Hierarchia catholica medii et recentioris aevi... (in Latin). Vol. IX (1903-1922). Padua: Messagero di San Antonio. ISBN 978-88-250-1000-8.

=== Studies ===
- Cappelletti, Giuseppe (1864). Le chiese d'Italia: dalla loro origine sino ai nostri giorni (in Italian). Vol. Tomo decimonono (19). Venice: G. Antonelli. pp. 139–154.
- Conte, Luigi (1857). Memorie filologiche sull'antichità della chiesa di Cerignola. (in Italian). Napoli: G. Cardamone 1857.
- Dilorenzo, Cosimo (1987). Cerignola da arcipretura nullius a sede vescovile nella bolla «Quamquam per nuperrimam». Profilo dei vescovi dal 1818 al 1987. (in Italian). Cerignola, Amministrazione comunale, 1987.
- Disanto, Angelo; Pergola, Nicola (2012). Arcipreti nullius e vescovi cerignolani. (in Italian) Cerignola: Centro ricerche di storia ed arte “Nicola Zingarelli" 2012.
- D'Avino, Vincenzio (1848). Cenni storici sulle chiese arcivescovili, vescovili, e prelatizie (nullius) del regno delle due Sicilie (in Italian). Naples: dalle stampe di Ranucci. pp. 33–35. [by Canon Giacomo Leocavallo]
- Kehr, Paulus Fridolin (1962). Italia pontificia. Regesta pontificum Romanorum. Vol. IX: Samnia – Apulia – Lucania. Berlin: Weidmann. (in Latin). pp. 145–147.
- Klewitz, Hans-Walter (1933). "Zur geschichte der Bistumsorganisation Campaniens und Apuliens im 10. und 11. Jahrhundert", (in German), in: Quellen und Forschungen aus italienischen archiven und bibliotheken, XXIV (1932–33), pp. 58–59.
- Mattei-Cerasoli, Leone (1918), "Di alcuni vescovi poco noti," (in Italian), in: Archivio storico per le provincie Napolitane XLIII (n.s. IV 1918), pp. 363–382, at p. 366.
- Ughelli, Ferdinando; Coleti, Niccolo (1721). Italia sacra, sive De episcopis Italiae et insularum adjacentium. Vol. Tomus octavus (8). Venice: Apud Sebastianum Coleti. pp. 224–241.
