= Diocese of Rieti =

Latin Catholic ecclesiastical jurisdiction in Italy

Diocese of Rieti (-S. Salvatore Maggiore) Dioecesis Reatina (-S. Salvatoris Maioris)

Catholic
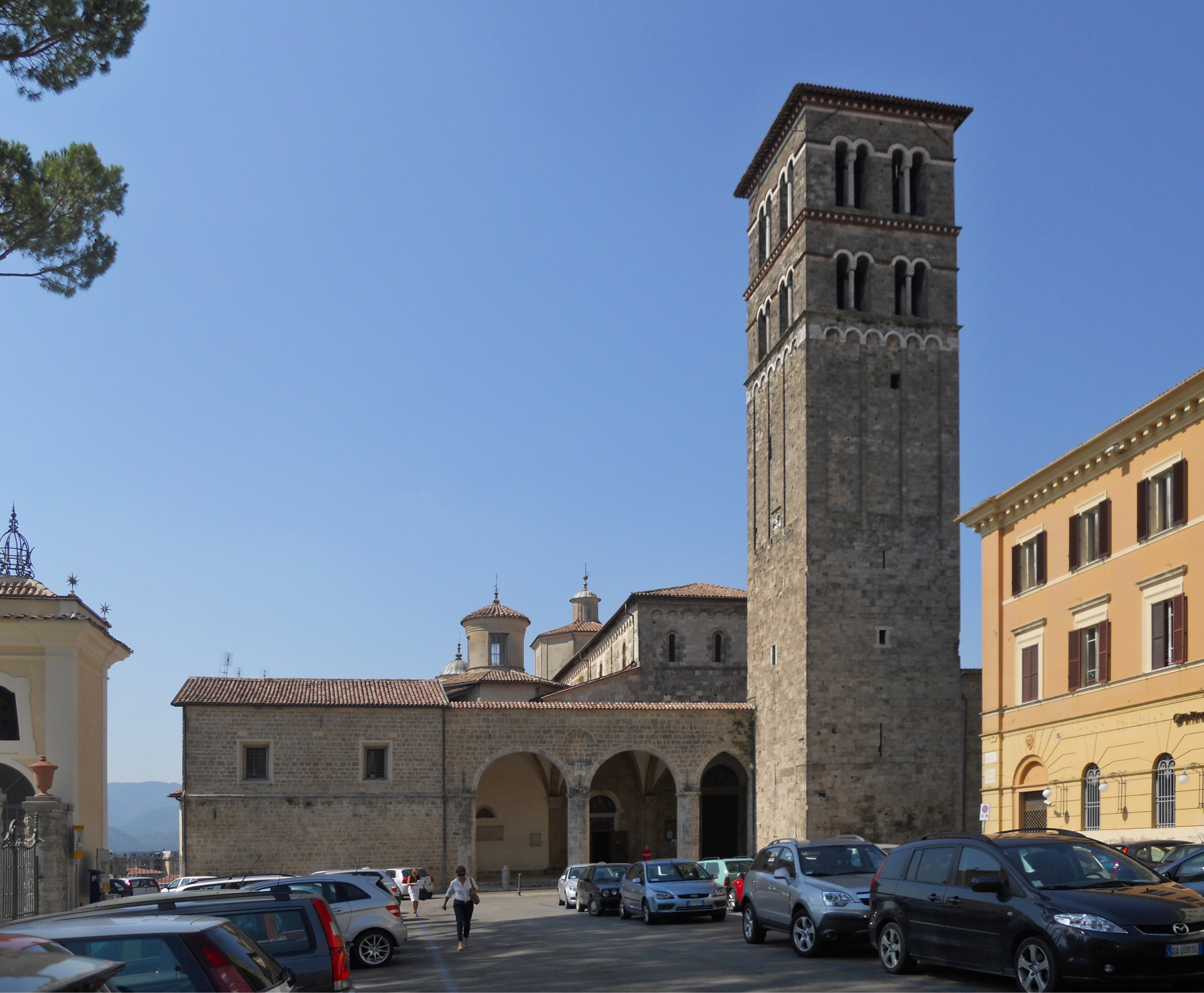
- St. Mary Cathedral, Rieti

Location
- Country: Italy
- Ecclesiastical province: Immediately exempt of the Holy See

Statistics
- Area: 1,818 km^{2} (702 sq mi)
- Population: Total; Catholics: (as of 2022); 94,700 ▼; 89,600 (est.) ▼
- Parishes: 94

Information
- Denomination: Catholic Church
- Sui iuris church: Latin Church
- Rite: Roman Rite
- Established: 5th century
- Cathedral: Cattedrale di Santa Maria Assunta
- Patron saint: Eleutherius and Antia
- Secular priests: 63 (diocesan) ▼26 (Religious Orders) ▲16 Permanent Deacons ▼

Current leadership
- Pope: Leo XIV
- Bishop: Vito Piccinonna

Website
- Chiesa di Rieti (in Italian)

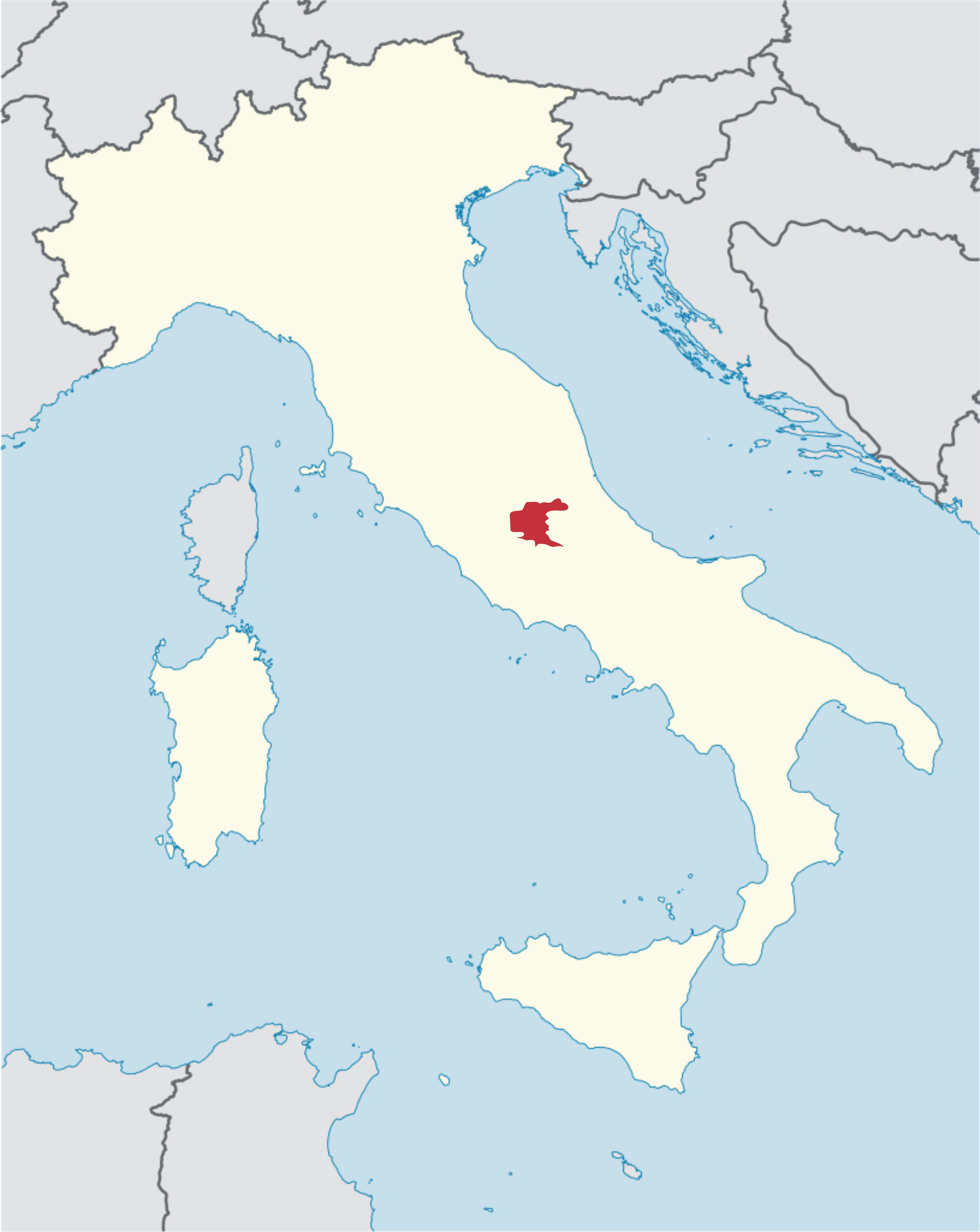
Map of Diocese of Rieti

The Diocese of Rieti (Latin: Dioecesis Reatina (-S. Salvatoris Maioris)) is a Latin Church ecclesiastical territory or diocese of the Catholic Church in Italy. It is immediately exempt to the Holy See. Its cathedra is in St. Mary Cathedral in the episcopal see of Rieti.

== History ==
The diocese was established in the fifth century.

In 1148, the city of Rieti was attacked and destroyed by King Roger of Sicily. On 10 August 1201, the city was totally destroyed by fire.

Pope Innocent III visited Rieti for a month, in July and August 1198. He is said to have consecrated the churches of S. Giovanni Evangelista and S. Eleuterio.

In March 1074, Pope Gregory VII gave the Benedictine monastery of Ss. Quiricus and Giulitta to Bishop Rainerius (1074–1084), and ordered all its monks and laypersons to obey him in all things. In 1215, when the monks had murdered their abbot and dissipated their income, Pope Innocent III had them expelled, and introduced the Premonstratensians in their place.

In 1228, Pope Gregory IX (dei Conti di Segni) was driven out of Rome by the supporters of the Emperor Frederick II; he spent a month in April and May in exile in Rieti, before moving to other places of refuge. He was driven from Rome a second time on 1 June 1231, and sought refuge again in Rieti, where he remained for more than a year.

Pope Nicholas IV (Masci) spent part of 1188, from 13 May to 15 October, in Rieti; in 1289, he was there from 18 May to 7 October. On 29 May 1289, in the cathedral of Reate, Pope Nicholas IV crowned Charles II of Sicily as King of Sicily.

Pope Boniface VIII (Caetani) visited Rieti from 28 August to 5 December 1298. On 28 November 1298, a major earthquake struck Rieti, Spoleto and Città di Pieve, causing considerable loss of life and destruction of buildings.

The diocese of Rieti would have lost territory on 24 June 1502, when Pope Alexander VI established the Diocese of Città Ducale, but Cardinal Giovanni Colonna, the Bishop of Rieti (1480–1508) objected, and the plan was dropped, the territory being returned to Rieti on 8 November 1505, as a diocese under the Administratorship of the cardinal. However, after Cardinal Colonna died on 26 September 1508, Pope Julius II reactivated the diocese of Città Ducale on 16 October 1508. The diocese was suppressed on 27 June 1818, but its territory did not return to the diocese of Rieti; it was given instead to the diocese of L'Aquila. On 3 June 1925 Pope Pius XI added S. Salvatore Maggiore to the name of the diocese, upon the suppression of the monastery of S. Salvatore Maggiore.

Newly returned from the Council of Trent, and under the influence of Cardinal Carlo Borromeo, Cardinal Marco Antonio Amulio (1562–1572) began, in 1564, a plan to establish a seminary in Rieti. His plan was modest, a student body of twenty-six, with an appropriate number of teachers of the humanities, philosophy, and theology. The original location of the institution was the former Palace of the Podestà. Financing was, and always remained the difficulty. Vacant benefices were appropriated for the faculty, and the income from other benefices was used to pay for free tuition for the students. But payments that supported the benefices were always in arrears.

=== Chapter and cathedral ===
The original cathedral was dedicated to the Virgin Mary, Mother of God, and was in existence by 598. In that year, a deacon of the church wrote to Pope Gregory I, requesting that he order the relics of Ss. Hermas, Hyacinth and Maximus be enshrined in the cathedral, a task which the Pope entrusted to Bishop Chrysanthus of Spoleto, presumably because the See of Rieti was vacant. This cathedral was subject to the unwelcome attentions of the Goths, the Lombards, and the Saracens, leaving it in a dilapidated condition. The influx of population into the town made its size inadequate.

A new cathedral was begun by Bishop Benincasa, a patrician of Rieti, who laid the cornerstone on 27 April 1109. The design included a lower church (or crypt) and an upper church. The lower church was consecrated in 1137, and was the site of the election of Bishop Dodo. There was a long intermission in building due to the attacks of King Roger of Sicily, a supporter of Pope Anacletus II against Pope Innocent II; Roger was an enemy of Pope Innocent, defeated him in battle, and dominated central Italy. In 1148, the city of Rieti was destroyed by King Roger, and its people fled to the hills and dispersed. In 1201, the city was destroyed again, this time by fire. Another fire took place in 1214. The upper church was consecrated by Pope Honorius III, who had been driven out of Rome and was living in exile in Rieti, on 9 September 1225. Bishop Antonino Camarda (1724–1754) renewed the pavement of the cathedral in 1735, and Bishop Marini rebuilt the tribune, presbytery, and the high altar, which was reconsecrated in 1806. The cathedral was given the title of basilica by Pope Gregory XVI in 1841.

The bishop's palace, next to the cathedral, suffered repeated injuries from fires and earthquakes, until, in 1283, Bishop Pietro Guerra (1278–1286) began a complete reconstruction, along with the addition of a grand salon for large meetings.

The Chapter of the cathedral is a corporate body, which is responsible for the administration and serving of the cathedral and the maintenance of its liturgical events. At Rieti it was composed of sixteen Canons, headed by the Archdeacon. The Canons had a common treasury, rather than individual prebends. There were also twelve beneficed priests, called clerici beneficiati. Cardinal Benedetto Cappelletti (1833–1834) established an additional twelve beneficed priests, called beneficiati Cappelletti.

=== Diocesan synods ===
A diocesan synod was an irregularly held, but important, meeting of the bishop of a diocese and his clergy. Its purpose was (1) to proclaim generally the various decrees already issued by the bishop; (2) to discuss and ratify measures on which the bishop chose to consult with his clergy; (3) to publish statutes and decrees of the diocesan synod, of the provincial synod, and of the Holy See.

Bishop Giorgio Bolognetti summoned and presided over a diocesan synod in Rieti on 24–25 September 1645, and had the decrees published. On 27 September 1678, Bishop Ippolito Vicentini (1670–1702) held a diocesan synod, and had the constitutions published. Bishop Bernardino Guinigi (1711–1723) presided over a diocesan synod in Rieti on 13 September 1716. In 1766, Bishop Giovanni de Vita (1764–1774) held a diocesan synod.

== Bishops ==
=== to 1200 ===
[Prosdocimus (1st cent.)]
...

- Ursus (attested 499, 501)

...

- Probus (mid-6th cent.)
- Albinus (6th century)

...

- Gaudiosus (attested 649)

...

- Adrianus (attested 680)

...

- Teuto (attested 753–764)
- Guicpertus (attested c. 770–773)
- Isermundus (attested 773)
- Agio (attested 776)
- Sinualdus (attested 777)
- Guicpertus (attested 778)
- Petrus (attested 779)
- Guicpertus (attested 780)
- Alfredus (Arnefredus) (attested 782–794)
- Isermundus (attested 803–814)

...
Sede vacante ( ? 852)

- Colo (attested 852–861)
- Joannes (c. 864)
- Theudardus (attested 875)

[Richardus (attested 887)]
...

- Thebaldus (attested 945)
- Anastasius (attested 948)

...

- Albericus (attested 969)
- Heldebaldus (attested 975)
- Joannes (attested 982)
- Obertus (attested 995)

...

- Jucundus (attested 1050)
- Gerardus (attested 1050, 1059)

...

- Rainerius (attested 1074–1084)

...

- Benincasa (attested 1109–1113)
- Teuzo (attested 1114–1118)
- Colo (attested 1122)
- Joannes (attested 1129)
- Gentile (attested 1133, 1135)
- Dodo (attested 1137–1181)
- Septimius Quarini (1182)
- Benedictus (attested 1182–1185)

...

- Adenolfo Secenari (attested 1188–1212)

=== 1200 to 1500 ===
- Rainaldus, O.S.B. (1215–c.1233)

[Odo (c. 1227)]

- Rainerius (attested 1233)
- Joannes (attested 1236)
- Rainaldus d'Arezzo, O.Min. (attested 1250)
- Thomas (1250–1265?)
- Gotifredus (1265–1275)

Sede vacante (1275–1278)

- Pietro Guerra (1278–1286)
- Andreas (1286–1294?)
- Nicolaus ( ? –1296)
- Berardus (1296–1299)
- Jacobus (1299–1301)
- Angelus, O.Min. (1302)
- Giovanni Muti (1302–1339)
- Tommaso (1339–1342)
- Raimundus de Chameyrac (1342–1346)
- Biagio da Leonessa, O.Min. (1347–1378)
- Bartolomeo Mezzavacca (1378–1380)
- Ludovicus Alfani (1380–1397)
- Ludovico Cichi Cola Teodenari (1397–1436)

Sede vacante (1436–1438)

Joannes (1436–1438) Administrator

- Mattia Foschi (1438–1450)
- Cardinal Angelo Capranica (1450–1468 Resigned)
- Cardinal Giovanni Colonna (1480–1508) Administrator
- Pompeo Colonna (1508–1514 Resigned)
- Scipione Colonna (1520–1528)
- Cardinal Pompeo Colonna (1528 – 27 Aug 1529 Resigned)
- Mario Aligeri (1529–1555)
- Giovanni Battista Osio (23 Oct 1555 – 12 Nov 1562 Died)
- Cardinal Marco Antonio Amulio (1562–1572)
- Mariano Vittori (2 Jun 1572 – 29 Jun 1572 Died)
- Alfonso María Binarini (18 Jul 1572 –1574)
- Costantino Barzellini, O.F.M. Conv. (30 Aug 1574 –1584)
- Giulio Cesare Segni (27 Aug 1584 – 16 Jun 1603 Resigned)

=== 1500 to 1800 ===
- Giovanni Desideri (16 Jun 1603 – 1604 Died)
- Gaspare Pasquali, O.F.M. Conv. (31 May 1604 – 13 Jun 1612 Died)
- Cardinal Pier Paolo Crescenzi (1612–1621)
- Giovanni Battista Toschi (1621–1633)
- Gregorio Naro (6 Feb 1634 – 7 Aug 1634 Died)
- Giovanni Francesco Guidi di Bagno (16 Apr 1635 – 28 Feb 1639 Resigned)
- Giorgio Bolognetti (28 Feb 1639 – 1660 Resigned)
- Odoardo Vecchiarelli (5 May 1660 – 31 Jul 1667 Died)
- Cardinal Giulio Gabrielli (12 Mar 1668 – 2 Aug 1670 Resigned)
- Ippolito Vicentini (22 Dec 1670 – 20 Jun 1702 Died)
- François-Marie Abbati (8 Jun 1707 –1710)
- Bernardino Guinigi (1 Jun 1711 –1723)
- Antonino Serafino Camarda, O.P. (12 Jun 1724 – 24 May 1754)
- Gaetano de Carli (16 Dec 1754 – 24 Feb 1761)
- Girolamo Clarelli (6 Apr 1761 – 18 Jun 1764)
- Giovanni de Vita (26 Nov 1764 – 1 Apr 1774)
- Vincenzo Ferretti (17 Jul 1775 –1779)
- Saverio Marini (20 Sep 1779 – 6 Jan 1813)

=== since 1800 ===
Giuseppe Giannini (1814) Vicar Apostolic

- Carlo Fioravanti (1814–1818)
- Francesco Saverio (François-Xavier) Pereira (2 Oct 1818 – 2 Feb 1824)
- Timoteo Maria (Antonio) Ascensi, O.C.D. (24 May 1824 – 24 Apr 1827 Resigned)
- Gabriele Ferretti (1827–1833)
- Cardinal Benedetto Cappelletti (29 Jul 1833 – 15 May 1834)
- Filippo de' Conti Curoli (30 Sep 1834 – 26 Jan 1849)
- Gaetano Carletti (28 Sep 1849 – 26 Jul 1867)
- Egidio Mauri, O.P. (1871–1888)
- Carlo Bertuzzi (11 Feb 1889 –1895)
- Bnaventura Quintarelli (18 Mar 1895 – 31 Oct 1915)
- Tranquillo Guarneri (9 Dec 1915 – 16 Jun 1916 Resigned)
- Francesco Sidoli (20 Jun 1916 –1924)
- Massimo Rinaldi, C.S. (2 Aug 1924 – 31 May 1941)
- Benigno Luciano Migliorini, O.F.M. (19 Jul 1941 –1951)
- Raffaele Baratta (18 Apr 1951 –1959)
- Vito Nicola Cavanna (20 Jan 1960 –1971)
- Dino Trabalzini (28 Jun 1971 –1980)
- Francesco Amadio (14 May 1980 – 30 Sep 1989 Retired)
- Giuseppe Molinari (30 Sep 1989 –1996)
- Delio Lucarelli (30 Nov 1996 – 15 May 2015 Retired)
- Domenico Pompili (15 May 2015 – )

== Books ==
- Gams, Pius Bonifatius (1873). Series episcoporum Ecclesiae catholicae: quotquot innotuerunt a beato Petro apostolo (in Latin). Ratisbon: Typis et Sumptibus Georgii Josephi Manz. p. 720.
- Eubel, Conradus, ed. (1913). Hierarchia catholica (in Latin). Vol. 1 (Tomus I) (second ed.). Münster: Libreria Regensbergiana.
- Eubel, Conradus, ed. (1914). Hierarchia catholica (in Latin). Vol. 2 (Tomus II) (second ed.). Münster: Libreria Regensbergiana.
- Eubel, Conradus; Gulik, Guilelmus, eds. (1923). Hierarchia catholica (in Latin). Vol. 3 (Tomus III) (second ed.). Münster: Libreria Regensbergiana.
- Gauchat, Patritius (Patrice) (1935). Hierarchia catholica (in Latin). Vol. 4 Tomus IV (1592-1667). Münster: Libraria Regensbergiana.
- Ritzler, Remigius; Sefrin, Pirminus (1952). Hierarchia catholica medii et recentis aevi V (1667-1730) (in Latin). Patavii: Messagero di S. Antonio.
- Ritzler, Remigius; Sefrin, Pirminus (1958). Hierarchia catholica medii et recentis aevi (in Latin). Vol. Tomus VI (1730-1799). Patavii: Messagero di S. Antonio.
- Ritzler, Remigius; Sefrin, Pirminus (1968). Hierarchia Catholica medii et recentioris aevi sive summorum pontificum, S. R. E. cardinalium, ecclesiarum antistitum series... A pontificatu Pii PP. VII (1800) usque ad pontificatum Gregorii PP. XVI (1846) (in Latin). Vol. VII. Monasterii: Libr. Regensburgiana.
- Remigius Ritzler; Pirminus Sefrin (1978). Hierarchia catholica Medii et recentioris aevi... A Pontificatu PII PP. IX (1846) usque ad Pontificatum Leonis PP. XIII (1903) (in Latin). Vol. VIII. Il Messaggero di S. Antonio.
- Pięta, Zenon (2002). Hierarchia catholica medii et recentioris aevi... A pontificatu Pii PP. X (1903) usque ad pontificatum Benedictii PP. XV (1922) (in Latin). Vol. IX. Padua: Messagero di San Antonio. ISBN 978-88-250-1000-8.

=== Studies ===
- Cappelletti, Giuseppe (1846). Le chiese d'Italia della loro origine sino ai nostri giorni (in Italian). Vol. quinto. Venezia: G. Antonelli. pp. 293–353.
- Desanctis, Paolo (1887). Notizie storiche sopra il tempio cattedrale, il capitolo, la serie dei vescovi, ed i vetusti monasteri di Rieti (in Italian). Rieti: Trinchi.
- Galletti, Pier Luigi (1765). Memorie di tre antiche chiese di Rieti denominate s. Michele Arcangelo al Ponte, sant'Agata alla Rocca, e san Giacomo (in Italian). Roma: per Generoso Salomoni.
- Kehr, Paul Fridolin (1908). Italia pontificia. vol. IV. Berlin 1909. pp. 21–28. (in Latin)
- Lanzoni, Francesco (1927), Le diocesi d'Italia dalle origini al principio del secolo VII (an. 604), Faenza 1927, pp. 356–358. (in Italian)
- Maroni, Faustus Antonius (1766). F. A. Maroni Commentarius de Ecclesiis et Episcopis Ostiensibus et Veliternis, in que Ughelliana series emendatur, continuatur, et illustratur (in Latin). Roma: Bizzarini Komarek.
- Michaeli, Michele (1897). Memorie istoriche della città di Rieti e dei paesi circostanti dall'origine all'anno 1560 (in Italian). Vol. primo. Rieti: Trinchi. Michaeli, Michele (1898). Volume secondo.
- Schwartz, Gerhard (1913), Die Besetzung der Bistümer Reichsitaliens unter den sächsischen und salischen Kaisern : mit den Listen der Bischöfe, 951-1122, Leipzig-Berlin 1913, p. 290. (in German)
- Ughelli, Ferdinando; Coleti, Niccolò (1717). Italia sacra sive De Episcopis Italiae, et insularum adjacentium (in Latin). Vol. Tomus primus (1) (editio secunda, aucta et emendata ed.). Venice: apud Sebastianum Coleti. pp. 1194–1217.
