= Municipal Theatre of Teramo =

Theatre in Teramo, Italy

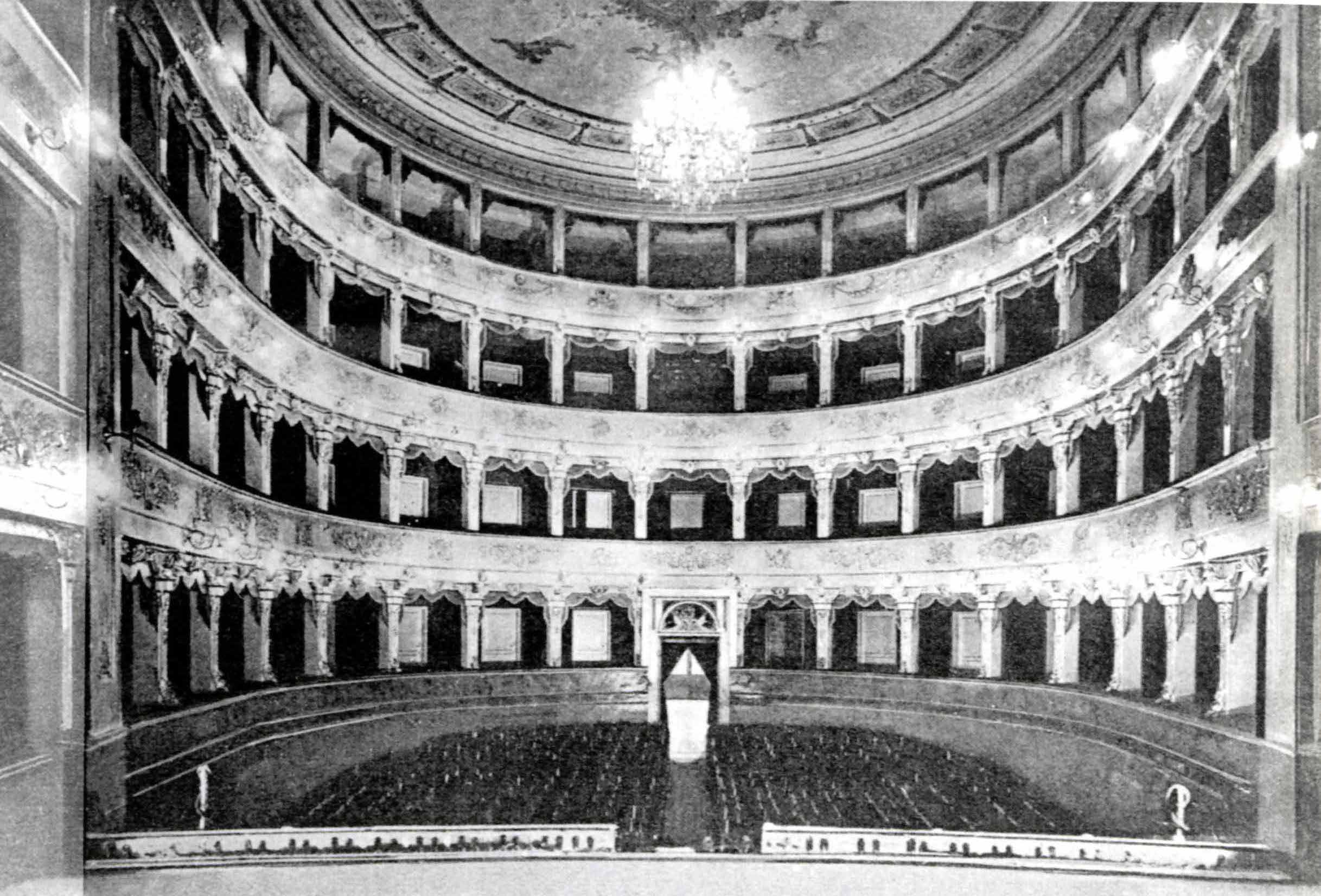
- Address: Corso San Giorgio; Teramo; Italy
- Capacity: 608
- Type: Three classes of platforms and gallery

Construction
- Opened: 1686
- Demolished: 1959
- Years active: 91
- Architect: Nicola Mezucelli

The Municipal Theatre of Teramo was the largest and the most important theatre in the city of Teramo. It was located in Corso San Giorgio, near Piazza Garibaldi. The theatre was inaugurated in 1868 and demolished in 1959. It lasted 91 years, without reaching a century. In its place the new municipal Cineteatro and a large commercial warehouse were constructed.

== History ==
The first location in Teramo City of which we have sure information was the one opened in Corradi House around 1792, in which this important family used to live, near the current Via Vittorio Veneto.

Since 1840, therefore, the necessity of having a public theatre and not a private one got stronger, until some projects were made. One of these was the one from Marchese Spaccaforno, but it was never realized.

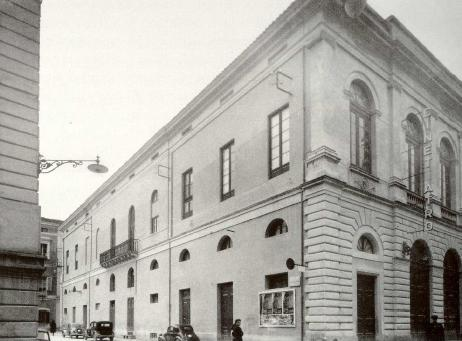
The Municipal Theatre from Corso San Giorgio's view

After around 20 years of arguments, reviewed projects and continually forgotten, things changed thanks to the National Unity. The architect Nicola Mezucelli from Teramo was charged to make the final project of the new Municipal Theatre of the city. The work, managed in a short period of time, gave the desired theatre to the population. The official inauguration took place on April 20, 1868, during the evening, with Il ballo in maschera, an opera by Giuseppe Verdi.

The Municipal Theatre has been very active since its opening, even though it never achieved excellent levels. There have been a lot of shows and the fact that many people went to see them confirmed the interest of the population for the structure.

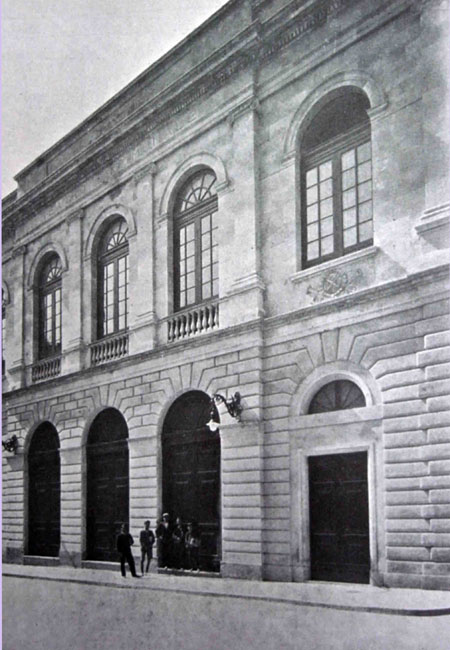
Main facade of the theatre

After the First World War, the theatrical activity became progressively less intense and the high level cultural shows were really insufficient. The advent of the cinema and the imminent start of the Second World War determined the final compromise of the aims of the theatre. In 1936, the Municipality of Teramo decided to turn the theatre into a movie theatre and also to change its name in Cineteatro Comunale.

The theatrical activity found itself sharing spaces and times with the cinematographic one. The last certain theatre season was that of 1954. From 1954 to 1959, the year of its demolition, the Municipal Theatre Functioned almost exclusively as a movie theatre.

The unstable condition of the building, the excessive cost of the necessary restoration work, the ceased opera activity and the opening of new cinema spaces, both in the city and in the province, determined the need to take drastic decisions on the future of the theatre.

Also due to a local economic situation that was struggling to recover from the results of a heavy war, the Municipality of Teramo made some deals with somme of the first department stores of commercial distribution. The people of Teramo saw in the opening of new commercial chains and in the promise of important jobs a lifeline.

On May 18, 1959, the city council decided to demolish the theatre. Carino Gambacorta was then the mayor of the city. Out of 25 councillors, only two voted against the demolition proposal. The remaining 23 were in favour. The people were essentially in favour of the decision. Few and isolated voices tried to defend the structure.

On November 30, 1959 the demolition of the Municipal Theatre began. In its place was erected the building that today houses the modern Cineteatro and the department store SottoSopra.

== Structure ==
The Municipal Theatre building was externally very modest. There were three entries and, in addition to be closed by arched doors, they had never used Casino appartements windows on the upper floor. The entry and the principal facade in front of Corso San Giorgio, where the central entry was situated, hadn't any monumental characteristic. Nor for dimensions, neither for decorations. The interior, and particularly the hall, were very fascinating. The hall, equipped with extraordinary acoustic, was capable to host a lot of spectators: total capacity was 608 sits. The location was built in a horseshoe form.

There were 56 stages, organised on three orders. On the highest part there was a large gallery, for which a low cost entry ticket was expected. The stage was very significant: about 200 square metres, equipped with the most modern stage machine installations. There were a "so called puller machine, to move all scenery flats ahead and behind at the same time", a sophisticated device that could create thunder sounds on the stage through «a box full of pieces of wood with a toothed wheel», or the rain, through «a tin wheel with a wooden foot», or «a burst of the thunderbolt», through «thin boards of walnut, iron plates and ropes».

The stage arch was gracefully decorated, as was the vault of the hall. The same furnishings chosen by Mezucelli were carefully studied. 24 tin can lights with reverberation for the opera's mouth", "22 painted tin lights for the corridors and the stairs' shelves", "160 wooden chairs for the stalls, with circularly arranged armrests" were prepared. As well as the "lecterns, the insoles and the 30 ordinary chairs for the musicians", as well as the "paintings of the scene of the countryside, with the backstage, and corresponding skies". The curtain was of remarkable workmanship. It was decorated by Bernardino De Filippis Delfico and depicted a fine scene relating to the Coronation of Petrarch.Upstairs, overlooking Corso San Giorgio, there was an apartment intended to house the caretaker. In 1906 this room was radically transformed and adapted to the Reduced Theatre. This is how the famous Sala della Cetra was born, with its own stage and a large loft. The small curtain of this pretty room was decorated by Gennaro Della Monica with the representation of Giannina Milli improvising in Florence.In the remaining part of the theatre building there were elegantly decorated staircases, service stairs, numerous corridors, seven dressing rooms for artists, service rooms and a dressing room.In 1943, one of the two anti-aircraft sirens delivered by the Ministry of the Interior to the Prefecture of Teramo for the protection of the population in the event of air raids was installed on the roof of the theatre. The siren was then disassembled and returned to the State in 1949, together with its twin placed on the arch of Porta Reale.

== The Mystery of the Chandelier Modifies ==
In the centre of the vault in the hall of the Municipal Theatre there was a precious chandelier, commissioned by Nicola Mezucelli. It was a particularly beautiful work, designed by Carlo Ferrario, set designer at La Scala in Milan, and made in Milan by Antonio Pandiani, with a gilded bronze structure and "guardian of crystals", equipped with female sculptures on four sides and supported by "ropes with its wheel of pull". The cost of this chandelier of extraordinary beauty was very high: it was around 5,000 lire at the time.Following the demolition of the building in 1959, this chandelier was not officially known any more. There are two reconstructions recently advanced in relation to the fate of this artifact.

== Dismemberment and sale ==
A recent testimony released in the local press by the son of a Teramo robivecchi, now deceased, in the dismemberment and sale has indicated as used metal the end of this precious chandelier. According to the present testimony, the work was stolen from the demolition site of the theatre and subsequently sold to the deceased robivecchi; the latter, in relation to this purchase, was condemned for the crime of receiving stolen goods. The chandelier, dismembered in the crystal parts and now deformed, was then sold as used metal and then sent to the foundry.

== The copy in the church of the SS. Annunziata ==
A different reconstruction is based on the circumstance, confirmed by historical documentation, on the basis of which the architect Mezucelli made two separate copies of the chandelier: one to be installed in the hall of the Municipal Theatre and the other, slightly smaller, to be used as a stock.

The date on which the chandelier was dismantled from the vault of the theatre hall is not known with certainty; the most reliable hypotheses are those relating to 1959 (the year of the demolition of the building) or to the years just before or after the last known theatre season, that is, 1954.

The archive documents show that in 1960, one year after the end of the demolition work on the building, the chandelier removed from the vault was probably kept in storage. The Cathedral of Teramo, unlike today, did not have a parish in its bosom. The parish seat was located in the nearby church of Sant'Agostino, which thus played the role of Vicar Care of the Cathedral, at the time led by Don Giovanni Iobbi. On January 11, 1960, the Curated Vicar transmitted a note to the City of Teramo with which he asked to have access to the chandelier of the old theater, demolished the previous year, in order to adorn the church of the Immaculate Heart of Mary, of which the same Don Giovanni Iobbi will become the first parish priest, then under construction at the time in Piazza Garibaldi. The City Council then approved Resolution no. 80/38 on February 9, 1960 and ceded to the Vicar Care of the Cathedral "the chandelier in question". From this moment on, therefore, the chandelier became available to the Aprutina Church but in the Parish in Piazza Garibaldi the work will never arrive.

In Teramo, in the church of SS. Annunziata in Via Nicola Palma there is a chandelier very similar to the one at the time located in the Municipal Theatre. The archives, however, provide nothing in this respect in relation to this unique installation. The current Rector of the church has declared that he settled in the SS. Annunziata in 1954, the year of the last theater season in the building of Mezucelli (and, hypothetically, the chandelier may have been removed from the theater on that occasion). When he took office, the Rector found the chandelier of the church in the exact position it still occupies today. This work of remarkable similarity with the one present in the building of Mezucelli, therefore, was already there since 1954. In this case, the resolution of the city council cannot be explained, which in 1960, six years later, ceded the building (obviously still in the hands of the city council) to the vicar of the cathedral. However, it can be assumed that at the church of SS. Annunziata there is a smaller copy of the chandelier of the theater.

== See also ==
- Teramo Cathedral
- Roman Catholic Diocese of Teramo-Atri
