= Gastaldi =

Gastaldi is a surname. Notable people with the surname include:

- Andrea Gastaldi (1826–1889), Italian painter
- Bartolomeo Gastaldi (1818–1879), Italian geologist and palæontologist
- Ernesto Gastaldi (born 1934), Italian screenwriter
- Giacomo Gastaldi (c. 1500–1566), Italian cartographer, astronomer and engineer
- Giantommaso Gastaldi (1597–1655), Italian Roman Catholic bishop
- Girolamo Gastaldi (1616–1685), Italian Roman Catholic cardinal
- Nicol Gastaldi (born 1990), Argentine alpine skiers
- Román Gastaldi (born 1989), Argentine decathlete
- Sebastiano Gastaldi (born 1991), Argentine alpine skier
- Valeria Gastaldi (born 1981), Argentine singer

== See also ==
- Gastaldi synthesis, method for the organic synthesis of pyrazine
