= Giovanni Antonio Campano =

Neapolitan-born humanist

Most Reverend Giovanni Antonio Campano
- Bishop of Teramo
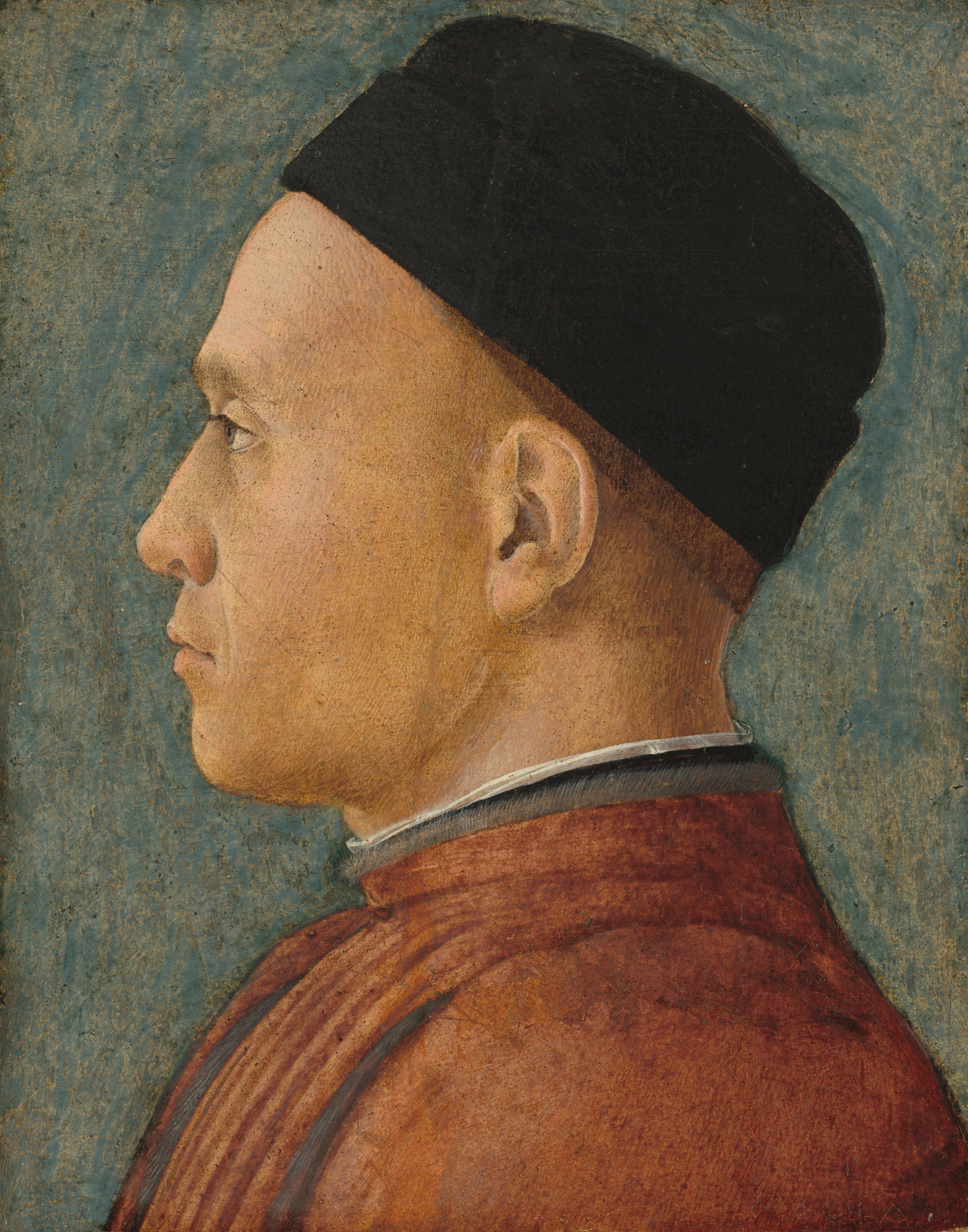
- Church: Catholic Church
- Diocese: Diocese of Teramo-Atri
- In office: 1463–1477
- Predecessor: Antonio Fatati
- Successor: Francesco de Perez

Personal details
- Born: February 27, 1429 Galluccio, Kingdom of Naples
- Died: 15 July 1477 (aged 48) Siena, Republic of Siena

Giovanni Antonio Campano (27 February? 1429 – 15 July 1477), a protégé of Cardinal Bessarion, was a Neapolitan-born humanist at the court of Pope Pius II, whose funeral oration he wrote, followed by a biography, flattering but filled with personal reminiscence, written ca 1470-77. Campanus was famous for his Latin orations, poems and letters. In addition to Bessarion's Academy, Campanus was a member of the Roman circle of Pomponius Leto. After the death of the Pope in 1464, Campano taught at the Florentine Academy.

== Biography ==
Giovanni Battista Campano was born at Cavelli, near Galluccio, in the province of Caserta, to a family of very modest condition, in the midst of the war between Angevin and Aragonese contenders for the Kingdom of Naples. A place as tutor to the sons of the noble Carlo Pandoni, where he spent six years, brought him to the notice of Michel Ferno. In 1452 he went to Perugia, under the patronage of the Baglioni, and, to his Latin added Greek, under the guidance of Demetrius Chalcondyles. Having been part of the loyal embassy sent on the city's behalf to Pope Callixtus III in 1455, on his return was called to the chair of rhetoric at the University of Perugia, 16 November 1455. At the elevation of Aeneas Silvius Piccolomini to the papacy as Pope Pius II in August 1458, Campano was again among the delegation from Perugia. It was Giacomo Cardinal Ammannati, apostolic secretary, who introduced him to the learned humanist Pius II, who named him bishop of Crotone in Calabria, 20 October 1462, the first of a series of episcopal appointments that found Campano at last Bishop of Teramo (23 May 1463). In Rome Campano was attached as secretary to the household of Alessandro Cardinal Oliva.

After Oliva's death in 1463, Campano joined the familia of Pius' nephew Francesco Todeschini Piccolomini (later briefly pope as Pius III), whom he accompanied to Germany in 1471. Following the death of Pius, his relations with Paul II deteriorated, but he was protected from the persecution of the humanists in 1468.

On March 7, 1469, the feast of St. Thomas, Campano delivered the annual encomium in honor of the "angelic doctor" for the Santa Maria sopra Minerva studium generale, the future Pontifical University of St. Thomas Aquinas, Angelicum.

Under Sixtus IV he was appointed governor of Todi (1472) and Città di Castello (1474), but his public comparison of papal military activities with the Turks resulted in his permanent disgrace. He died in Siena and is buried in the Duomo.

== Works and legacy ==
Campanus was known for his Latin poetry. The famous four epigrammatic lines on a sleeping nymph Huius nympha loci..., thought to be of Roman origin until revealed as a product of Renaissance humanism by Theodore Mommsen, were identified as Campano's from a note in a manuscript in the Bibliotheca Ricciardiana, Florence. He wrote a vita in Latin of the condottiero Braccio Fortebracci da Montone.

An Opera Campani Omnia edited by Michele Ferno, published at Rome, contains an introductory vita (2nd edition, Venice, 1495).
