= Anton Nicolai =

Polish Roman Catholic prelate

Most Reverend Anton Nicolai
- Auxiliary Bishop of Gniezno; Titular Bishop of Athyra
- Church: Catholic Church
- Archdiocese: Archdiocese of Gniezno
- In office: 1469–1474

Orders
- Consecration: 5 August 1470 by Bishop Giacomo

Personal details
- Died: 1474 Gniezno, Poland

Anton Nicolai (died 1474) was a Roman Catholic prelate who served as Titular Bishop of Athyra (1469–1474) and Auxiliary Bishop of Gniezno (1469–1474).

== Biography ==
Anton Nicolai was ordained a priest in the Order of Friars Minor. On 23 June 1469, was appointed during the papacy of Pope Paul II as Auxiliary Bishop of Gniezno and Titular Bishop of Athyra. On 5 August 1470, he was consecrated bishop by Bishop Giacomo, Bishop of Sant'Angelo dei Lombardi, with Antonio Cicco da Pontecorvo, Bishop of Caserta, and Barthelemy Uggeri, Bishop of Brugnato, serving as co-consecrators. He served as Auxiliary Bishop of Gniezno until his death in 1474.
