= Prospero Caffarelli =

Prospero Caffarelli may refer to:

- Prospero Caffarelli (died 1500), Italian bishop
- Prospero Caffarelli (died 1659), Italian cardinal
