= Francisco Frías =

Roman Catholic prelate

Most Reverend Bishop Francisco Frías
- Bishop of Ario
- Church: Catholic Church
- Archdiocese: Diocese of Ario
- In office: 1544–1550

Orders
- Consecration: 8 Dec 1544 by Matteo Griffoni Pioppi

Francisco Frías (died 10 Sep 1568) was a Roman Catholic prelate who served as Bishop of Ario (1544–1550).

== Biography ==
On 4 Jun 1544, Francisco Frías was appointed during the papacy of Pope Paul III as Bishop of Ario. On 30 Jun 1544, he was consecrated bishop by Matteo Griffoni Pioppi, Bishop of Trivento, with Scipione Rebiba, Titular Bishop of Amyclae, and Bernardino Silverii-Piccolomini, Bishop of Teramo, serving as co-consecrators. He served as Bishop of Ario until his resignation in 1550.

== External links and additional sources ==
- Cheney, David M. "Diocese of Ario". Catholic-Hierarchy.org. (for Chronology of Bishops)^{self-published}
- Chow, Gabriel. "Diocese of Ario (Greece)". GCatholic.org. (for Chronology of Bishops)^{self-published}

Catholic Church titles
| Preceded by | Bishop of Ario; 1544–1550 | Succeeded by |
