= Bartolomeo Uggeri =

Italian Roman Catholic prelate

Most Reverend Bartolomeo Uggeri
- Bishop of Brugnato
- Church: Catholic Church
- Diocese: Diocese of Brugnato
- In office: 1467–1479
- Successor: Antonio Da Valditaro

Personal details
- Died: 1479

Bartolomeo Uggeri (died 1479) was a Roman Catholic prelate who served as Bishop of Brugnato (1467–1479).

On 23 December 1467, Bartolomeo Uggeri was appointed Bishop of Brugnato by Pope Paul II.

He served as Bishop of Brugnato until his death in 1479. While bishop, he was the principal consecrator of Philippe Bartolomei, Bishop of Ario (1470), and the principal co-consecrator of Anton Nicolai, Auxiliary Bishop of Gniezno (1470).

== External links and additional sources ==
- Cheney, David M. "Diocese of Brugnato". Catholic-Hierarchy.org. (for Chronology of Bishops) ^{[self-published]}
- Chow, Gabriel. "Diocese of Brugnato (Italy)". GCatholic.org. (for Chronology of Bishops) ^{[self-published]}

Catholic Church titles
Preceded by	Bishop of Brugnato; 1467–1479	Succeeded by Antonio Da Valditaro
