= Antonio Cicco da Pontecorvo =

Italian Roman Catholic prelate

Most Reverend Antonio Cicco da Pontecorvo
- Bishop of Caserta
- Church: Catholic Church
- In office: 1459–1477

Personal details
- Died: 21 April 1477 Caserta, Italy

Antonio Cicco da Pontecorvo (died 21 April 1477) was a Roman Catholic prelate who served as Bishop of Caserta (1459–1477).

== Biography ==
Antonio Cicco da Pontecorvo was ordained a priest in the Order of Friars Minor. On 5 November 1459, he was appointed Bishop of Caserta by Pope Pius II. He served as Bishop of Caserta until his death on 21 April 1477.

== Episcopal succession ==
Episcopal succession of Antonio Cicco da Pontecorvo

While bishop, he was the principal co-consecrator of:

- Johann Isenberg, Auxiliary Bishop of Speyer (1467);
- Berthold von Oberg, Auxiliary Bishop of Mainz (1468);
- Philippe Bartolomei Bishop of Ario (1470);
- Mamerto Fichet Auxiliary Bishop of Genève (1470);
- Anton Nicolai, Auxiliary Bishop of Gniezno (1470);
- Weribold von Heys, Auxiliary Bishop of Münster (1471);
- Odon O'Driscoll, Bishop of Ross (1473);
- Nicolas de Caffa, Bishop of Toul (1473);
- Fernando de Castilla, Bishop of Granada (1474); and
- Archbishop Leonard, (1475).

Catholic Church titles
| Preceded by | Bishop of Caserta; 1459–1477 | Succeeded by |
