= Andrew II =

Andrew II may refer to:

- Andrew II of Naples, duke of Naples from 834 to 840
- Andrew II, Baron of Vitré (c. 1150–1210/11)
- Andrew II of Hungary (c. 1177–1235)
- Andrew II, Archbishop of Antivari (died 1462)

== See also ==
- Andrei II of Vladimir, (c. 1222–1264), third son of Yaroslav II
