= Saint Berardo =

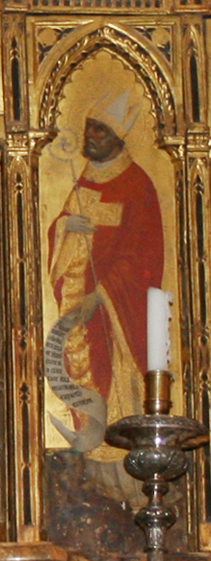

Bishop of Teramo
- Died: 19 December 1123; Teramo, Italy
- Venerated in: Roman Catholic Church
- Major shrine: St. Anne's Chapel in Teramo Cathedral
- Feast: 19 December
- Patronage: Teramo, Italy

Berardo (11th century – 19 December 1123) is an Italian saint, patron saint of the city and diocese of Teramo.

== Life ==
St Berardo was born into the noble family da Pagliara, whose castle bore their name near the town of Isola del Gran Sasso in the Abruzzo region of Italy. Important information concerning his life is found in the ancient church records from this area as well as the chronicles of his successor, the Bishop Sassone. Berardo entered the monastery in Montecassino as a young man and was later associated with the Abbey of San Giovanni in Venere. He became well known for his good works and upon the death of the Bishop Uberto, Berardo was asked to become a pastor in the territory of Teramo. He took on this role for seven years beginning in 1116 and focused his efforts on helping the poor and making peace amongst the warring factions of the local citizenry.

Berardo died in 1123. He was buried in what today is known as St. Anne's chapel in the ancient Teramo Cathedral of Santa Maria Aprutiensis (now Sant'Anna dei Pompetti). This is one of the few locations which were not destroyed by the siege and burning of Teramo carried out by the Norman commander, Roberto di Loretello.

Around 1174, upon the initiative of the Bishop Attone, the remains of Berardo were transferred to the newly completed cathedral of Teramo, first to a crypt where they remained for 600 years and finally, in 1776, to a chapel built by the people of Teramo in his honor during the leadership of the Bishop Pirelli.

== Cult, miracles, and icons ==
The Feast of Saint Berardo is celebrated on December 19, in commemoration of the day of Berardo's death.

Several miracles have been attributed to him. A 16th-century bust and a 17th-century likeness of his arm giving a blessing, both in silver, can be found in Teramo Cathedral. A stone statue of Berardo which formerly covered his crypt, is now located at the summit of a chapel dedicated to his honor. Within the cathedral's sacristy is a 17th-century altarpiece by the Polish painter Sebastiano Majeski bearing the likeness of Berardo entitled The Miracle of Saint Berardo. Also located in the cathedral is a painting by Giuseppe Bonolis, depicting The Virgin Mary and Saint Berardo liberating the city of Teramo from the siege of the Duke of Atri and numerous other works depicting the life of Berardo. An outstanding and varied collection of engravings and prints related to Berardo was chronicled and organized by Raffaele Aurini in 1973. It is a comprehensive biographical and iconographical source of information related to the life of this saint.

Over the years, the municipal authorities of Teramo have at various times taken up and abandoned the yearly custom of lighting a large candle in honour of Berardo.

== Bibliography ==
- Cesare Baronio, Annales ecclesiastici, To. XII, Ticini, Typ. H. Bartoli, 1641, p. 149.
- Niccola Palma, Storia ecclesiastica e civile della regione più settentrionale del regno di Napoli … oggi città di Teramo e diocesi aprutina, voll. 5, Teramo, Angeletti, 1832–1836, vol. I (1832), pp. 138–151; III edizione, Teramo, Cassa di Risparmio, 1978, vol. I, pp. 305–335.
- Mutio de’ Mutij, Della storia di Teramo dialoghi sette, con note ed aggiunte di Giacinto Pannella, Teramo, Tip. del Corriere Abruzzese, 1893, dialogo primo, par. 15, pp. 38 e sgg.
- Il Cartulario della Chiesa Teramana. Codice Latino in pergamena del sec. XII dell’Archivio vescovile di Teramo, a cura di Francesco Savini, Roma, Forzani, 1910, pp. 70–83.
- Vincenzo Gilla Gremigni, Berardo, Vescovo di Teramo, santo, in Bibliotheca Sanctorum, Roma, Istituto Giovanni XXIII nella Pontificia Università Lateranense, 1962, vol. II, col.1271.
- Raffaele Aurini, Berardo da Pagliara, in Dizionario bibliografico della gente d’Abruzzo, vol. V, Teramo, Edigrafital, 1973 e in Nuova edizione, Colledara, Teramo, Andromeda editrice, 2002, vol. I, pp. 248–258.
- Gabriele Orsini, La Diocesi di Teramo-Atri all’alba del terzo millennio, Teramo, Edizioni Interamnia, 1999, pp. 25–29.
- Manuscripts regarding the life of Saint Berardo by various authors are located in Rome at the library “Biblioteca Vallicelliana”, in L’Aquila at the provincial library "Salvatore Tommasi”, in Teramo at the provincial library “M. Delfico” and in the Teramo Bishopric Archives.
