= Lorenzo Fieschi =

Italian Catholic prelate (??–1519)

Most Reverend Lorenzo Fieschi
- Bishop of Mondovi
- Church: Catholic Church
- Diocese: Diocese of Mondovì
- In office: 1512–1519
- Predecessor: Carlo Roero
- Successor: Ottobono Fieschi
- Previous posts: Bishop of Brugnato (1502–1510); Bishop of Ascoli Piceno (1510–1512)

Orders
- Consecration: 14 December 1502 by Domenico Valdettaro

Personal details
- Died: 13 February 1519 Mondovì, Italy

Lorenzo Fieschi (died 13 Feb 1519) was a Roman Catholic prelate who served as Bishop of Mondovi (1512–1519), Bishop of Ascoli Piceno (1510–1512), and Bishop of Brugnato (1502–1510).

== Biography ==
On 28 September 1502, Lorenzo Fieschi was appointed during the papacy of Pope Alexander VI as Bishop of Brugnato. On 14 December 1502, he was consecrated bishop by Domenico Valdettaro, Bishop of Acci, with Domenico Vaccari, Bishop of Ventimiglia, and Giacomo della Rovere, Bishop of Mileto, serving as co-consecrators. On 24 May 1510, he was appointed during the papacy of Pope Julius II as Bishop of Ascoli Piceno. On 15 October 1512, he was appointed during the papacy of Pope Julius II as Bishop of Mondovi. He served as Bishop of Mondovi until his death on 13 February 1519.

== External links and additional sources ==
- Cheney, David M. "Diocese of Brugnato". Catholic-Hierarchy.org. (for Chronology of Bishops) ^{[self-published]}
- Chow, Gabriel. "Diocese of Brugnato (Italy)". GCatholic.org. (for Chronology of Bishops) ^{[self-published]}
- Cheney, David M. "Diocese of Ascoli Piceno". Catholic-Hierarchy.org. (for Chronology of Bishops) ^{[self-published]}
- Chow, Gabriel. "Diocese of Ascoli Piceno (Italy)". GCatholic.org. (for Chronology of Bishops) ^{[self-published]}
- Cheney, David M. "Diocese of Mondovi". Catholic-Hierarchy.org. (for Chronology of Bishops) ^{[self-published]}
- Chow, Gabriel. "Diocese of Mondovi (Italy)". GCatholic.org. (for Chronology of Bishops) ^{[self-published]}

Catholic Church titles
Preceded by Simone Chiavari	Bishop of Brugnato; 1502–1510	Succeeded by Melchiorre Grimaldi
Preceded by Giuliano Cesarini	Bishop of Ascoli Piceno; 1510–1512	Succeeded by Girolamo Ghinucci
Preceded by Carlo Roero	Bishop of Mondovi; 1512–1519	Succeeded by Ottobono Fieschi
