= Diocese of Brugnato =

Former Latin Catholic diocese in Italy

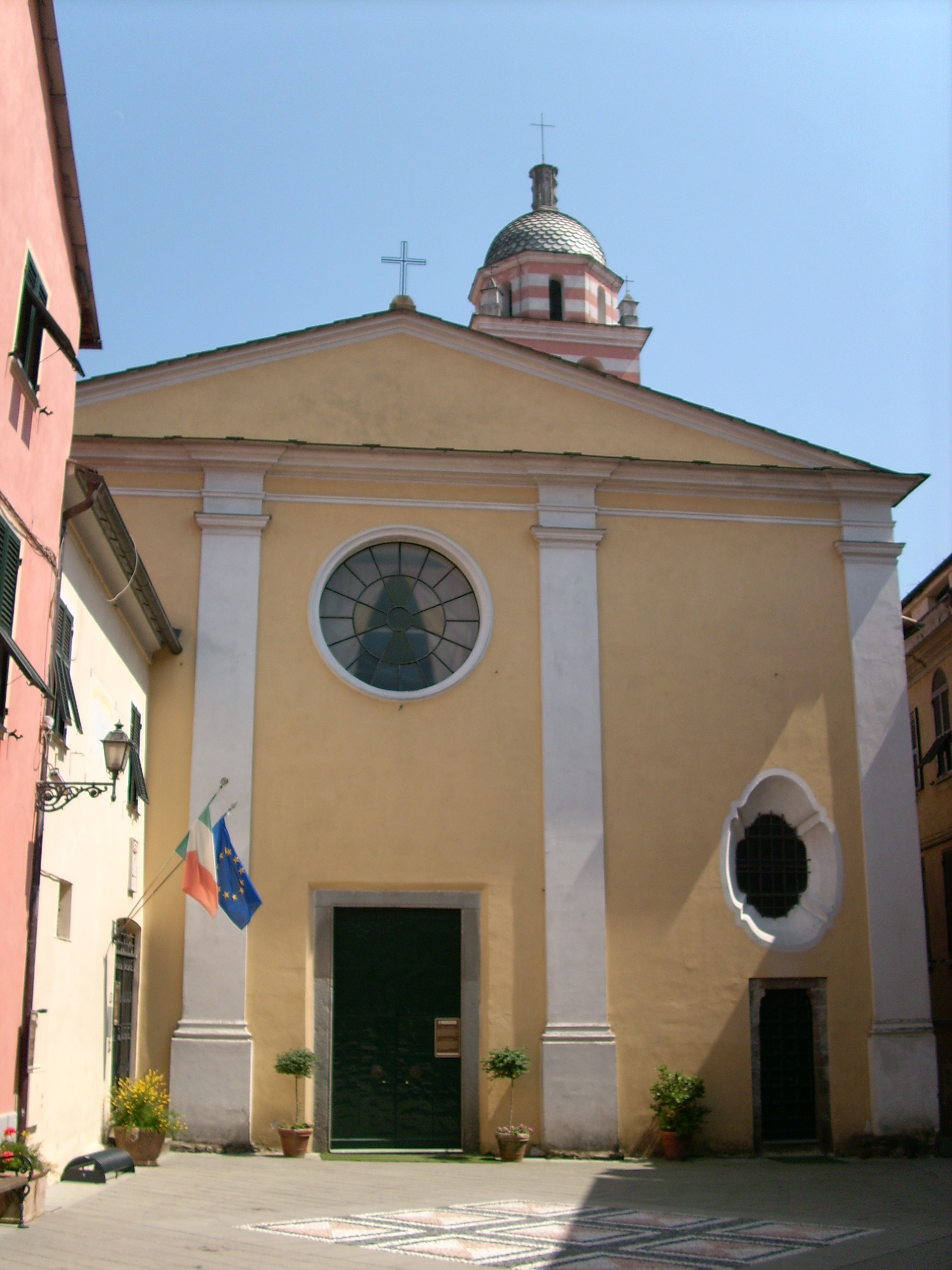
Co-Cathedral in Brugnato

The Diocese of Brugnato (Latin: Dioecesis Brugnatensis) was a Latin Church diocese of the Catholic Church located in the city of Brugnato in the Province of La Spezia in Italy. The city of c. 1200 persons, is located on the Vara River, about 70 kilometres southeast of Genoa and about 15 km northwest of La Spezia.

On 25 November 1820, it was united with the Diocese of Luni e Sarzana, aeque personaliter (one bishop holds two or three distinc dioceses), to form the Diocese of Luni, Sarzana e Brugnato. In 1986, the diocese was suppressed.

== History ==
On 27 May 1133, Innocent II issued the bull "Quemadmodum Sedes," establishing the former monastery of SS. Peter, Lawrence and Columbanus in Brugnato as a diocese. Its territory was to consist of all the properties which had belonged to the monastery, nearly all of which were (or rather had been) in the diocese of Luni, which was directly subject to the pope. Two days earlier, he had removed the diocese of Genoa from the ecclesiastical province of Milan, and created a new province, with Syrus of Genoa as the new metropolitan archbishop. Brugnato was assigned as one of his suffragan bishops. Innocent's purpose was to punish Milan, which had chosen to support the other pope in the schism of 1130, Anacletus II, by removing Liguria from Milan's ecclesiastical province and by reducing its influence to the south. It was also a compensation for Genoa, which had done badly in negotiations and settlement with Pisa in the matter of Sardinia and Corsica.

In 1239, when he established the diocese of Noli (Naulensis), Pope Gregory IX united it with the diocese of Brugnato aeque personaliter. The bishop of both dioceses was Guillelmus Contardi (1230–after 1250), who had been Bishop-elect of Brugnato since 1230. On 6 February 1253, however, Pope Innocent IV separated the two dioceses again, and Contardi continued as Bishop-elect of Brugnato.

=== Chapter and cathedral ===
The cathedral originally had a Chapter, composed of six canons, headed by the Archpriest, each with a prebend. By 1512, at the beginning of the administration of Bishop Filippo Sauli (1512–1528), there were only three canons, and Pope Leo X ordered the bishop to raise the number to the original six. The bishop and canons had evidently entered into a number of agreements (conventiones) with the commune of Genoa, probably from 1133; they were required to take oaths to observe the agreements every four years. The earliest recorded example dates from 1241.

==== Diocesan synods ====
A diocesan synod was an irregularly held, but important, meeting of the bishop of a diocese and his clergy. Its purpose was (1) to proclaim generally the various decrees already issued by the bishop; (2) to discuss and ratify measures on which the bishop chose to consult with his clergy; (3) to publish statutes and decrees of the diocesan synod, of the provincial synod, and of the Holy See.

Bishop Nicolò Mascardi (1579–1584) held a diocesan synod in 1581. Bishop Francesco Durazzo (1640–1652) held a diocesan synod for Brugnato at Sestri Orientale on 21 April 1643, and published the constitutions. Bishop Giambattista de Dece (1663–1696) held a diocesan synod on 23 May 1675, and Bishop Domenico Tatis another in 1762.

=== Gains and losses ===
On 4 July 1797, Pope Pius VI, at the request of the Grand Duke of Tuscany, created the Diocese of Pontremoli (Apuana). In doing so, he asigned the new diocese some parishes which had belonged to the diocese of Brugnato.

On 25 November 1820, the diocese of Brugnato was united aeque personaliter with the Diocese of Luni e Sarzana to form the Diocese of Luni, Sarzana e Brugnato.

- 1854: Lost territory to the Diocese of Massa Carrara
- 1855: Lost territory to the Diocese of Pontremoli

On 12 January 1929, the diocese of Brugnato lost territory to establish the Diocese of La Spezia

On 26 July 1959, the diocese of Brugnato gained territory from the Diocese of Pontremoli and exchanged territory with Diocese of Chiavari

=== Diocesan reorganization of 1986 ===
The Second Vatican Council (1962–1965), in order to ensure that all Catholics received proper spiritual attention, decreed the reorganization of the diocesan structure of Italy and the consolidation of small and struggling dioceses. It also recommended the abolition of anomalous units such as exempt territorial prelatures.

On 18 February 1984, the Vatican and the Italian State signed a new and revised concordat. Based on the revisions, a set of Normae was issued on 15 November 1984, which was accompanied in the next year, on 3 June 1985, by enabling legislation. According to the agreement, the practice of having one bishop govern two separate dioceses at the same time, aeque personaliter, was abolished. Instead, the Vatican continued consultations which had begun under Pope John XXIII for the merging of small dioceses, especially those with personnel and financial problems, into one combined diocese.

On 30 September 1986, Pope John Paul II ordered that the dioceses of Luni, Sarzana e Brugnato be merged into one diocese with one bishop, with the Latin title Dioecesis Spediensis-Sarzanensis-Brugnatensis. There was to be one episcopal seat, in La Spezia, the largest town and the civil provincial capital. The cathedrals of the dioceses of Sarzana and Brugnato were to become co-cathedrals, and their Chapters called Chapters of the co-cathedrals. The clergy and parishes of the individual suppressed dioceses were to become the clergy and parishes of the Diocese of La Spezia-Sarzana-Brugnato. The bishop was granted the power to move whichever diocesan offices he wished.

== Bishops of Brugnato ==
Erected: 1133
Latin Name: Brugnatensis
Metropolitan: Archdiocese of Genoa

=== From 1133 to 1500 ===
- Ildeprandus (1133– )
- Hieronymus Laumellinus (c. 1147–1172)
- Lanfranc ((c. 1178)
- Albertus ((c. 1178)
- Guillelmus Spinola
- Sinibaldus Fieschi (1200–1230)
- Guillelmus Contardi (1230–after 1250)
- Balduin Fieschi (c. 1252)
- Philippus Pallavicini (c. 1262–1264)
- Sorleone, O.P. (1265–1280)
- Philippus Passano (1281– )
- Harduinus de Franchi
- Jacobus de Pontremoli (1300–1320?)
- Gerardus, O.Min. (1321–1339)
- Lambertus (1340–1344)
- Tropetus da Cancellis (1344–1362)
- Ludovicus Gandolfi, O.F.M. (1363–1390)
- Lando Plancio (1390–1400) Roman Obedience
- Simon de Fanascheriis (1418)
- Thomas de Henriginis (1418–1438)
- Antonio Vergafalce (1438–1467)
- Barthelemy Uggeri (1467–1479)
- Antonio Da Valditaro (1478–1491)
- Simone Chiavari, O.S.B. (1492–1502 Resigned)

=== From 1500 to 1820 ===
- Lorenzo Fieschi (1502–1510 Appointed, Bishop of Ascoli Piceno)
- Melchiorre Grimaldi (1510–1512)
- Filippo Sauli (1512–1528)
- Cardinal Girolamo Grimaldi (1528–1535 Resigned) Administrator
- Cardinal Francesco Cornaro (1535–1539) Administrator
- Cardinal Agostino Trivulzio (1539–1548) Administrator
- Antonio Cogorno, O.P. (1548–1565 Resigned)
- Giulio Sauli (1565–1570 Died)
- Antonio Paliettino (de Monelia), O.F.M. Conv. (1571–1578)
- Nicolò Mascardi (1579–1584)
- Camillo Daddeo (Doddeo) (1584–1592)
- Stefano Bagliani (Baliano) (1592–1609)
- Francesco Mottini (1609–1623)
- Vincenzo Giovanni Spínola, O.S.A. (1623–1639)
- Francesco Durazzo (1640–1652)
- Giantommaso Gastaldi, O.P. (1652–1655)
- Giovanni Battista Paggi, B. (1655–1663)
- Giambattista De Dece, C.R. (1663–1696)
- Francesco Maria Sacco, C.R. (1697–1721)
- Nicolò Leopoldo Lomellini (1722–1754 Died)
- Domenico Tatis, O.S.B. (1754–1765)
- Francesco Maria Gentile (1767–1791)
- Giovanni Luca Solari (1792–1810)

Sede vacante (1810-1820)
○ Cardinal Giuseppe Spina, Archbishop of Genoa (1814–1820) Apostolic Administrator

25 November 1820: The diocese was suppressed, and its territory united with the Diocese of Luni e Sarzana to form the Diocese of Luni, Sarzana e Brugnato

== See also ==
- Catholic Church in Italy

== Sources ==
=== Reference Works ===
- Eubel, Conradus, ed. (1913). Hierarchia catholica (in Latin). Vol. 1 (Tomus 1) (second ed.). Münster: Libreria Regensbergiana. p. 148.. Archived.
- Eubel, Conradus, ed. (1914). Hierarchia catholica (in Latin). Vol. 2 (Tomus 2) (second ed.). Münster: Libreria Regensbergiana. p. 230.. Archived.
- Eubel, Conradus, ed. (1923). Hierarchia catholica (in Latin). Vol. 3 (Tomus 3) (second ed.). Münster: Libreria Regensbergiana. p. 293.. Archived.
- Gams, Pius Bonifatius (1873). Series episcoporum Ecclesiae catholicae: quotquot innotuerunt a beato Petro apostolo. Ratisbon: Typis et Sumptibus Georgii Josephi Manz. pp. 906-907. (Use with caution; obsolete)
- Gauchat, Patritius (Patrice) (1935). Hierarchia catholica (in Latin). Vol. IV (1592-1667). Münster: Libraria Regensbergiana.
- Ritzler, Remigius; Sefrin, Pirminus (1952). Hierarchia catholica medii et recentis aevi (in Latin). Vol. V (1667-1730). Patavii: Messagero di S. Antonio.
- Ritzler, Remigius; Sefrin, Pirminus (1958). Hierarchia catholica medii et recentis aevi (in Latin). Vol. VI (1730-1799). Patavii: Messagero di S. Antonio.
- Ritzler, Remigius; Sefrin, Pirminus (1968). Hierarchia Catholica medii et recentioris aevi (in Latin). Vol. VII (1800–1846). Monasterii: Libr. Regensburgiana.
- Ritzler, Remigius; Sefrin, Pirminus (1978). Hierarchia catholica Medii et recentioris aevi (in Latin). Vol. VIII (1846–1903). Il Messaggero di S. Antonio.
- Pięta, Zenon (2002). Hierarchia catholica medii et recentioris aevi (in Latin). Vol. IX (1903–1922). Padua: Messagero di San Antonio. ISBN 978-88-250-1000-8.

=== Studies ===
- Cappelletti, Giuseppe (1857). Le chiese d'Italia della loro origine sino ai nostri giorni (in Italian). Vol. 13 (decimoterzo). Venezia: Giuseppe Antonelli. pp. 464–486.
- Kehr, Paul Fridolin (1914). Italia Pontificia. Vol. VI: Liguria sive Provincia Mediolanensis. (in Latin). Berlin: Weidemann, pp. 368-370.
- Ughelli, Ferdinando; Coleti, Niccolò (1719). Italia sacra, sive De episcopis Italiæ, et insularum adjacentium (in Latin). Vol. Tomus quartus (4). Venezia: Sebastianum Coleti. pp. 979–998.
- Zolesi, Domenico (1848). "Dimostrazione di alcuni errori ne quali e incorso il P. Semeria nella seconda sua Opera che ha per titolo SECOLI CRISTIANI DELLA LIGURIA intorno al Capitolo e Canonici della Chiesa Cattedrale di Brugnato," (in Italian). In: Rivista ligure Vol. 1, part 2 (Genoa: Sordo-Muti 1843), pp. 347-358.
