= Benedetto Paconati =

Most Reverend Benedetto Paconati
- Bishop of Bagnoregio
- Church: Catholic Church
- Diocese: Diocese of Bagnoregio
- In office: 1438–1445
- Successor: Corrado da Matelica
- Previous post: Bishop of Ario (1434–1438)

Personal details
- Died: 1445 Bagnoregio, Italy

Benedetto Paconati (died 1445) was a Roman Catholic prelate who served as Bishop of Bagnoregio (1438–1445) and Bishop of Ario (1434–1438).

== Biography ==
On 22 September 1434, Benedetto Paconati was appointed by Pope Eugene IV as Bishop of Ario. On 10 January 1438, he was appointed by Pope Eugene IV as Bishop of Bagnoregio. He served as Bishop of Bagnoregio until his death in 1445.

While bishop, he served as the principal co-consecrator of Michael Padrolo, Bishop of Nemosia (1443); Johann Krewel, Bishop of Ösell (1443); and João Manuel, Bishop of Ceuta (1444).

== External links and additional sources ==
- Cheney, David M. "Diocese of Ario". Catholic-Hierarchy.org. (for Chronology of Bishops)^{self-published}
- Chow, Gabriel. "Diocese of Ario (Greece)". GCatholic.org. (for Chronology of Bishops)^{self-published}
- Cheney, David M. "Diocese of Bagnoregio (Bagnorea)". Catholic-Hierarchy.org. (for Chronology of Bishops) ^{[self-published]}
- Chow, Gabriel. "Titular Episcopal See of Bagnoregio (Italy)". GCatholic.org. (for Chronology of Bishops) ^{[self-published]}

Catholic Church titles
Preceded by Nicola Salma di Candia	Bishop of Ario; 1434–1438	Succeeded by Antonio Mina di Candia
Preceded by	Bishop of Bagnoregio; 1445–1446	Succeeded by Corrado da Matelica
