= Simone Chiavari =

15th-century Roman Catholic bishop

Most Reverend Simone Chiavari
- Bishop of Brugnato
- Church: Catholic Church
- Diocese: Diocese of Brugnato
- In office: 1492–1502
- Predecessor: Antonio Da Valditaro
- Successor: Lorenzo Fieschi

Simone Chiavari was a Roman Catholic prelate who served as Bishop of Brugnato (1492–1502).

== Biography ==
On 11 April 1492, Simone Chiavari was appointed during the papacy of Pope Innocent VIII as Bishop of Brugnato. He served as Bishop of Brugnato until his resignation in 1502.

== See also ==
- Catholic Church in Italy

== External links and additional sources ==
- Cheney, David M. "Diocese of Brugnato". Catholic-Hierarchy.org. (for Chronology of Bishops) ^{[self-published]}
- Chow, Gabriel. "Diocese of Brugnato (Italy)". GCatholic.org. (for Chronology of Bishops) ^{[self-published]}

Catholic Church titles
Preceded by Antonio Da Valditaro	Bishop of Brugnato; 1492–1502	Succeeded by Lorenzo Fieschi
