= Giulio Sauli (bishop) =

Roman Catholic prelate

Most Reverend Giulio Sauli
- Bishop of Brugnato
- Church: Catholic Church
- Diocese: Diocese of Brugnato
- In office: 1565–1570
- Predecessor: Antonio Cogorno
- Successor: Antonio Paliettino

Orders
- Consecration: 21 April 1566 by Benedetto Lomellini

Personal details
- Died: 1570 Brugnato, Italy

Giulio Sauli (died 1570) was a Roman Catholic prelate who served as Bishop of Brugnato (1565–1570).

== Biography ==
On 26 October 1565, Giulio Sauli was appointed during the papacy of Pope Pius IV as Bishop of Brugnato. On 21 April 1566, he was consecrated bishop by Benedetto Lomellini, Cardinal-Deacon of Santa Sabina, with Pierdonato Cesi (seniore), Administrator of Narni, and Gerolamo Melchiori, Bishop of Macerata, serving as co-consecrators. He served as Bishop of Brugnato until his death in 1570.

== External links and additional sources ==
- Cheney, David M. "Diocese of Brugnato". Catholic-Hierarchy.org. (for Chronology of Bishops) ^{[self-published]}
- Chow, Gabriel. "Diocese of Brugnato (Italy)". GCatholic.org. (for Chronology of Bishops) ^{[self-published]}

Catholic Church titles
Preceded by Antonio Cogorno	Bishop of Brugnato; 1565–1570	Succeeded by Antonio Paliettino
