= Antonio Da Valditaro =

Italian Roman Catholic prelate

Most Reverend Antonio Da Valditaro
- Bishop of Brugnato
- Church: Catholic Church
- Diocese: Diocese of Brugnato
- In office: 1478–1491
- Predecessor: Barthelemy Uggeri
- Successor: Simone Chiavari

Personal details
- Died: 1491

Antonio Da Valditaro (died 1491) was a Roman Catholic prelate who served as Bishop of Brugnato (1478–1491).

In 1478, Antonio Da Valditaro was appointed during the papacy of Pope Sixtus IV as Bishop of Brugnato. He served as Bishop of Brugnato until his death in 1491.

== External links and additional sources ==
- Cheney, David M. "Diocese of Brugnato". Catholic-Hierarchy.org. (for Chronology of Bishops) ^{[self-published]}
- Chow, Gabriel. "Diocese of Brugnato (Italy)". GCatholic.org. (for Chronology of Bishops) ^{[self-published]}

Catholic Church titles
Preceded by Barthelemy Uggeri	Bishop of Brugnato; 1478–1491	Succeeded by Simone Chiavari
