= Niccolò Ruggeri =

Most Reverend Niccolò Ruggeri
- Bishop of Bagnoregio
- Church: Catholic Church
- Diocese: Diocese of Bagnoregio
- In office: 1446–1449
- Predecessor: Corrado da Matelica
- Successor: Agostino da Bagnoregio

Personal details
- Died: 1449 Bagnoregio, Italy

Niccolò Ruggeri (died 1449) was a Roman Catholic prelate who served as Bishop of Bagnoregio (1446–1449).

== Biography ==
Niccolò Ruggeri was appointed a priest in the Order of Friars Minor. On 27 May 1446, he was appointed by Pope Eugene IV as Bishop of Bagnoregio. He served as Bishop of Bagnoregio until his death in 1449. While bishop, he was the principal consecrator of André da Mule, Archbishop of Bar (1448), and the principal co-consecrator of Fernando Lujan (bishop), Bishop of Sigüenza (1449).

== External links and additional sources ==
- Cheney, David M. "Diocese of Bagnoregio (Bagnorea)". Catholic-Hierarchy.org. (for Chronology of Bishops) ^{[self-published]}
- Chow, Gabriel. "Titular Episcopal See of Bagnoregio (Italy)". GCatholic.org. (for Chronology of Bishops) ^{[self-published]}

Catholic Church titles
Preceded by Corrado da Matelica	Bishop of Bagnoregio; 1446–1449	Succeeded by Agostino da Bagnoregio
