= Giovanni Battista Paggi (bishop) =

Roman Catholic prelate

Most Reverend Giovanni Battista Paggi
- Bishop of Brugnato
- Church: Catholic Church
- Diocese: Diocese of Brugnato
- In office: 1655–1663
- Predecessor: Giantommaso Gastaldi
- Successor: Giambattista Dadece

Orders
- Consecration: 20 June 1655 by Giulio Cesare Sacchetti
- Created cardinal: ≤

Personal details
- Born: 1615 Genoa, Italy
- Died: 8 February 1663 (aged 47–48) Brugnato, Italy

Giovanni Battista Paggi, B. (1615 – 8 February 1663) was a Roman Catholic prelate who served as Bishop of Brugnato (1655–1663).

== Biography ==
Giovanni Battista Paggi was born in Genoa, Italy in 1615 and ordained a priest in the Barnabite Order. On 14 June 1655, he was appointed during the papacy of Pope Alexander VII as Bishop of Brugnato. On 20 June 1655, he was consecrated bishop by Giulio Cesare Sacchetti, Cardinal-Bishop of Frascati, with Francesco Antonio Sacchetti, Bishop of Troia, and Giacinto Cordella, Bishop of Venafro, serving as co-consecrators. He served as Bishop of Brugnato until his death on 8 February 1663.

== External links and additional sources ==
- Cheney, David M. "Diocese of Brugnato". Catholic-Hierarchy.org. (for Chronology of Bishops) ^{[self-published]}
- Chow, Gabriel. "Diocese of Brugnato (Italy)". GCatholic.org. (for Chronology of Bishops) ^{[self-published]}

Catholic Church titles
Preceded by Giantommaso Gastaldi	Bishop of Brugnato; 1655–1663	Succeeded by Giambattista Dadece
