= Berthold von Oberg =

German Roman Catholic prelate (died 1494)

Most Reverend Berthold von Oberg
- Auxiliary Bishop of Mainz; Titular Bishop of Banados
- Church: Catholic Church
- Diocese: Diocese of Mainz
- In office: 1468–1489

Orders
- Consecration: 26 May 1468 by Antonio

Personal details
- Died: 4 August 1494 Mainz, Germany

Berthold von Oberg, O.P. (died 1494) was a Roman Catholic prelate who served as Auxiliary Bishop of Mainz (1468–1489).

== Biography ==
Berthold von Oberg was ordained a priest in the Order of Preachers. On 13 May 1468, he was appointed during the papacy of Pope Paul II as Auxiliary Bishop of Mainz and Titular Bishop of Banados. On 26 May 1468, he was consecrated bishop by Antonio, Bishop of Civita Castellana e Orte, with Giacomo, Titular Bishop of Cervicensis, and Antonio Cicco da Pontecorvo, Bishop of Caserta, serving as co-consecrators. He served as Auxiliary Bishop of Mainz until his resignation in 1489. He died on 4 August 1494. While bishop, he was the principal co-consecrator of Berthold von Henneberg-Römhild, Archbishop of Mainz (1485).

== External links and additional sources ==
- Cheney, David M. "Diocese of Mainz". Catholic-Hierarchy.org. (for Chronology of Bishops) ^{[self-published]}
- Chow, Gabriel. "Diocese of Mainz (Germany)". GCatholic.org. (for Chronology of Bishops) ^{[self-published]}
