= Melchiorre Grimaldi =

Roman Catholic prelate

Most Reverend Melchiorre Grimaldi
- Bishop of Brugnato
- Church: Catholic Church
- Diocese: Diocese of Brugnato
- In office: 1510–1512
- Predecessor: Lorenzo Fieschi
- Successor: Filippo Sauli

Personal details
- Died: 1512

Melchiorre Grimaldi (died 1512) was a Roman Catholic prelate who served as Bishop of Brugnato (1510–1512).

== Biography ==
On 24 May 1510, Melchiorre Grimaldi was appointed during the papacy of Pope Julius II as Bishop of Brugnato. He served as Bishop of Brugnato until his death in 1512.

== External links and additional sources ==
- Cheney, David M. "Diocese of Brugnato". Catholic-Hierarchy.org. (for Chronology of Bishops) ^{[self-published]}
- Chow, Gabriel. "Diocese of Brugnato (Italy)". GCatholic.org. (for Chronology of Bishops) ^{[self-published]}

Catholic Church titles
Preceded by Lorenzo Fieschi	Bishop of Brugnato; 1510–1512	Succeeded by Filippo Sauli
