= Michael Padrolo =

Roman Catholic prelate

Most Reverend Michael Padrolo
- Bishop of Nemosia
- Church: Catholic Church
- Diocese: Diocese of Nemosia
- In office: 1443–?

Orders
- Consecration: 17 November 1443 by Bishop Radulphus

Michael Padrolo was a Roman Catholic prelate who served as Bishop of Nemosia (1443–?).

== Biography ==
Michael Padrolo was ordained a bishop in the Order of Preachers and appointed during the papacy of Pope Eugene IV as Bishop of Nemosia. On 17 November 1443, he was consecrated bishop by Radulphus, Bishop of Città di Castello, with Luis de La Guerra, Bishop of Guarda, and Benedetto Paconati, Bishop of Bagnoregio, serving as co-consecrators.

Catholic Church titles
Preceded by	Bishop of Nemosia; 1443–?	Succeeded by
