= Antonio Cogorno =

Most Reverend Antonio Cogorno
- Bishop of Brugnato
- Church: Catholic Church
- Diocese: Diocese of Brugnato
- In office: 1548–1565
- Predecessor: Agostino Trivulzio
- Successor: Giulio Sauli

Personal details
- Died: 1565 Brugnato, Italy

Antonio Cogorno O.P. (died 1565) was a Roman Catholic prelate who served as Bishop of Brugnato (1548–1565).

== Biography ==
Antonio Cogorno was ordained a priest in the Order of Preachers. On 5 March 1548, he was appointed during the papacy of Pope Paul III as Bishop of Brugnato. He served as Bishop of Brugnato until his death in 1565. While bishop, he was the principal co-consecrator of Bartolomeo Ferro, Bishop of Lettere-Gragnano (1567).

== External links and additional sources ==
- Cheney, David M. "Diocese of Brugnato". Catholic-Hierarchy.org. (for Chronology of Bishops) ^{[self-published]}
- Chow, Gabriel. "Diocese of Brugnato (Italy)". GCatholic.org. (for Chronology of Bishops) ^{[self-published]}

Catholic Church titles
Preceded by Agostino Trivulzio	Bishop of Brugnato; 1548–1565	Succeeded by Giulio Sauli
