= Antonio Paliettino =

Roman catholic prelate

Most Reverend Antonio Paliettino
- Bishop of Brugnato
- Church: Catholic Church
- Diocese: Diocese of Brugnato
- In office: 1571–1578
- Predecessor: Giulio Sauli
- Successor: Nicolò Mascardi

Orders
- Consecration: 22 July 1571 by Francisco Pacheco de Villena

Personal details
- Died: 1578 Brugnato, Italy

Antonio Paliettino de Monelia, O.F.M. Conv. (died 1578) was a Roman Catholic prelate who served as Bishop of Brugnato (1571–1578).

== Biography ==
Antonio Paliettino was ordained a priest in the Order of Friars Minor Conventual. On 16 July 1571, he was appointed during the papacy of Pope Pius V as Bishop of Brugnato. On 22 July 1571, he was consecrated bishop by Francisco Pacheco de Villena, Cardinal-Deacon of Santa Croce in Gerusalemme, with Balduino de Balduinis, Bishop of Aversa, and Antonio Rodríguez de Pazos y Figueroa, Bishop of Patti, serving as co-consecrators. He served as Bishop of Brugnato until his death in 1578.

== External links and additional sources ==
- Cheney, David M. "Diocese of Brugnato". Catholic-Hierarchy.org. (for Chronology of Bishops) ^{[self-published]}
- Chow, Gabriel. "Diocese of Brugnato (Italy)". GCatholic.org. (for Chronology of Bishops) ^{[self-published]}

Catholic Church titles
Preceded by Giulio Sauli	Bishop of Brugnato; 1571–1578	Succeeded by Nicolò Mascardi
