= Corrado da Matelica =

Italian Roman Catholic bishop (died 1446)

Most Reverend Corrado da Matelica
- Bishop of Bagnoregio
- Church: Catholic Church
- Diocese: Diocese of Bagnoregio
- In office: 1445–1446
- Predecessor: Benedetto Paconati
- Successor: Niccolò Ruggeri

Personal details
- Died: 1446 Bagnoregio, Italy

Corrado da Matelica (died 1446) was a Roman Catholic prelate who served as Bishop of Bagnoregio (1445–1446).

== Biography ==
Corrado da Matelica was appointed a priest in the Order of Friars Minor. On 26 September 1445, he was appointed by Pope Eugene IV as Bishop of Bagnoregio. He served as Bishop of Bagnoregio until his death in 1446.

== External links and additional sources ==
- Cheney, David M. "Diocese of Bagnoregio (Bagnorea)". Catholic-Hierarchy.org. (for Chronology of Bishops) ^{[self-published]}
- Chow, Gabriel. "Titular Episcopal See of Bagnoregio (Italy)". GCatholic.org. (for Chronology of Bishops) ^{[self-published]}

Catholic Church titles
Preceded by Benedetto Paconati	Bishop of Bagnoregio; 1445–1446	Succeeded by Niccolò Ruggeri
