= Filippo de Monti =

17th-century Catholic bishop

Most Reverend Filippo de Monti
- Bishop of Ascoli Piceno
- Church: Catholic Church
- Diocese: Diocese of Ascoli Piceno
- In office: 1670–1680
- Predecessor: Giulio Gabrielli
- Successor: Giuseppe Sallustio Fadulfi
- Previous post: Bishop of Teramo (1666–1670)

Orders
- Consecration: 17 Jan 1666 by Marcantonio Franciotti

Personal details
- Born: Fermo, Italy
- Died: 24 December 1680

Filippo de Monti (died 1680) was a Roman Catholic prelate who served as Bishop of Ascoli Piceno (1670–1680) and Bishop of Teramo (1666–1670).

== Biography ==
Filippo de Monti was born in Fermo, Italy. On 11 Jan 1666, he was appointed during the papacy of Pope Alexander VII as Bishop of Teramo. On 17 Jan 1666, he was consecrated bishop by Marcantonio Franciotti, Cardinal-Priest of Santa Maria della Pace. On 2 Jun 1670, he was appointed during the papacy of Pope Clement X as Bishop of Ascoli Piceno. He served as Bishop of Ascoli Piceno until his death on 24 Dec 1680.

== External links and additional sources ==
- Cheney, David M. "Diocese of Teramo-Atri". Catholic-Hierarchy.org. (for Chronology of Bishops)
- Chow, Gabriel. "Diocese of Teramo-Atri (Italy)". GCatholic.org. (for Chronology of Bishops)
- Cheney, David M. "Diocese of Ascoli Piceno". Catholic-Hierarchy.org. (for Chronology of Bishops)
- Chow, Gabriel. "Diocese of Ascoli Piceno (Italy)". GCatholic.org. (for Chronology of Bishops)

Catholic Church titles
Preceded by Angelo Mausoni	Bishop of Teramo; 1666–1670	Succeeded by Giuseppe Armenj
Preceded by Giulio Gabrielli	Bishop of Ascoli Piceno; 1670–1680	Succeeded by Giuseppe Sallustio Fadulfi
