= Filippo Sauli =

Italian Roman Catholic prelate

Most Reverend Filippo Sauli
- Bishop of Brugnato
- Church: Catholic Church
- Diocese: Diocese of Brugnato
- In office: 1512–1528
- Predecessor: Melchiorre Grimaldi
- Successor: Girolamo Grimaldi

Personal details
- Died: 1528

Filippo Sauli (died 1528) was a Roman Catholic prelate who served as Bishop of Brugnato (1512–1528).

== Biography ==
On 14 June 1512, Filippo Sauli was appointed during the papacy of Pope Julius II as Bishop of Brugnato. He served as Bishop of Brugnato until his death in 1528.

== External links and additional sources ==
- Cheney, David M. "Diocese of Brugnato". Catholic-Hierarchy.org. (for Chronology of Bishops) ^{[self-published]}
- Chow, Gabriel. "Diocese of Brugnato (Italy)". GCatholic.org. (for Chronology of Bishops) ^{[self-published]}

Catholic Church titles
Preceded by Melchiorre Grimaldi	Bishop of Brugnato; 1512–1528	Succeeded by Girolamo Grimaldi
