= Weribold von Heys =

German Roman Catholic prelate

Most Reverend Weribold von Heys
- Auxiliary Bishop of Münster
- Church: Catholic Church
- Diocese: Diocese of Münster
- In office: 1470–1477

Orders
- Consecration: 1 January 1471 by Giacomo

Personal details
- Died: 1477 Münster, Germany

Weribold von Heys (died 1477) was a Roman Catholic prelate who served as Auxiliary Bishop of Münster (1470–1477).

== Biography ==
Weribold von Heys was ordained a priest in the Order of Friars Minor. On 10 December 1470, he was appointed during the papacy of Pope Paul II as Auxiliary Bishop of Münster and Titular Bishop of Larissa in Syria. On 1 January 1471, he was consecrated bishop by Giacomo, Bishop of Sant'Angelo dei Lombardi, with Antonio Cicco da Pontecorvo, Bishop of Caserta, with Antonio de Bonaumbra, Bishop of Accia, serving as co-consecrators. He served as Auxiliary Bishop of Münster until his death in 1477.
