= Agostino da Bagnoregio =

Most Reverend Agostino da Bagnoregio
- Bishop of Bagnoregio
- Church: Catholic Church
- Diocese: Diocese of Bagnoregio
- In office: 1449–1459
- Predecessor: Niccolò Ruggeri
- Successor: Filippo Landolfi

Personal details
- Died: 1459 Bagnoregio, Italy

Agostino da Bagnoregio (died 1459) was a Roman Catholic prelate who served as Bishop of Bagnoregio (1449–1459).

== Biography ==
Agostino da Bagnoregio was appointed a priest in the Order of Saint Augustine. On 26 September 1445, he was appointed by Pope Eugene IV as Bishop of Bagnoregio. He served as Bishop of Bagnoregio until his death in 1446.

== External links and additional sources ==
- Cheney, David M. "Diocese of Bagnoregio (Bagnorea)". Catholic-Hierarchy.org. (for Chronology of Bishops) ^{[self-published]}
- Chow, Gabriel. "Titular Episcopal See of Bagnoregio (Italy)". GCatholic.org. (for Chronology of Bishops) ^{[self-published]}

Catholic Church titles
Preceded by Niccolò Ruggeri	Bishop of Bagnoregio; 1449–1459	Succeeded by Filippo Landolfi
