= Teramo Cathedral =

Cathedral in Teramo, Italy

Coordinates: 42°39′30.5″N 13°42′13.3″E

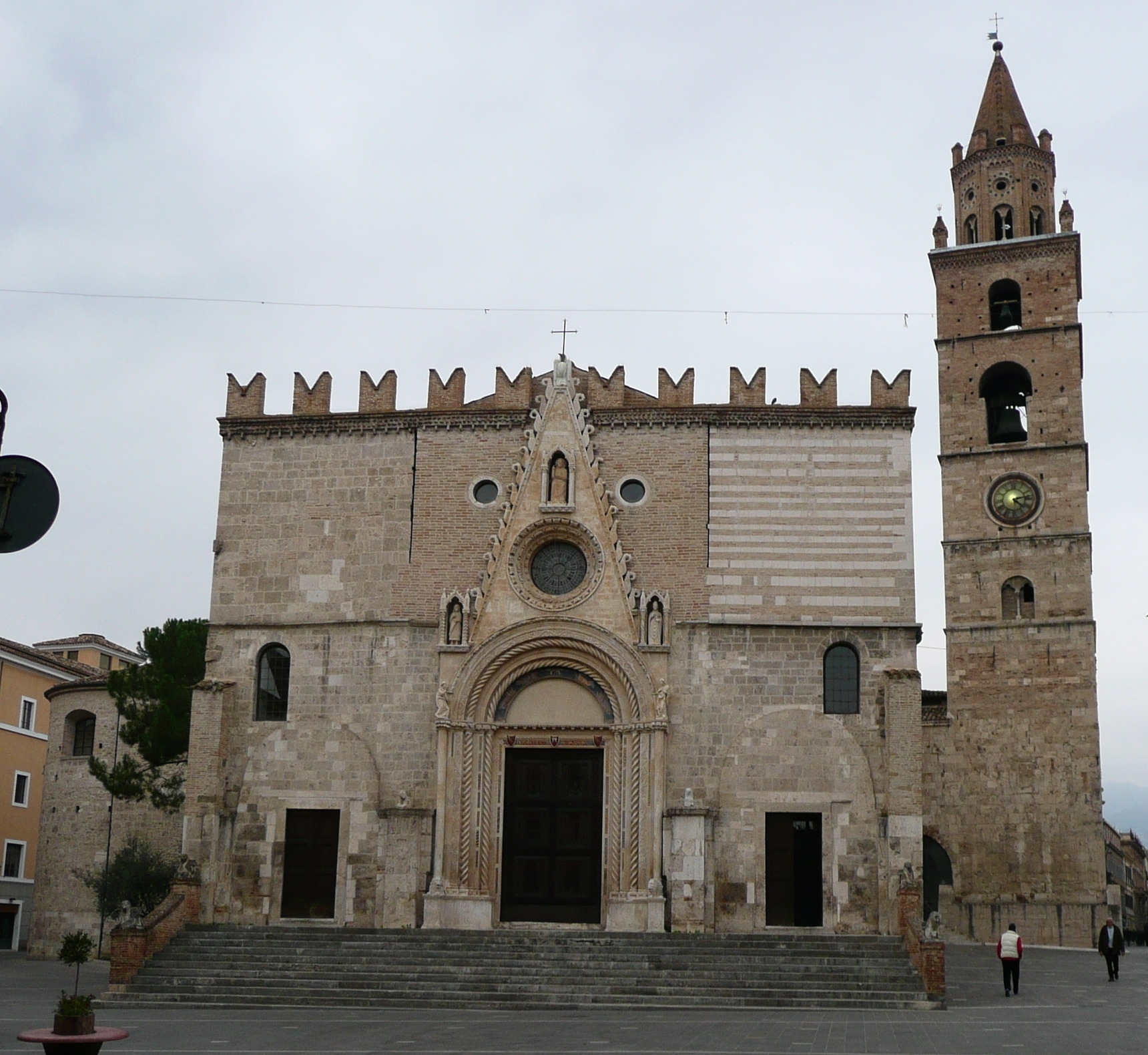
Teramo Cathedral west front

Teramo Cathedral (Italian: Duomo di Teramo, Cattedrale di Santa Maria Assunta) is a Roman Catholic cathedral in Teramo, Abruzzo, central Italy, dedicated to the Assumption of the Virgin Mary and to Saint Berardo, patron saint of the city. It is the seat of the Bishop of Teramo-Atri. Built in Romanesque-Gothic style, it was consecrated in 1176.

== History and description ==
The church was begun in 1158, by order of bishop Guido II of Teramo, in order to house the relics of Saint Berardo after the destruction of the former cathedral of Teramo, Santa Maria Aprutensis, by Robert of Loritello in 1155.

Plan of the cathedral

The edifice was finished in Romanesque style and consecrated in 1176. It had a nave and two aisles and a raised presbytery. Most likely it also had an external narthex. Part of the stone was taken from the nearby Roman theatre and amphitheatre; part of the latter was demolished to house the church.

In 1331-1335 bishop Niccolò degli Arcioni had the building extensively modified. The northern part was extended, starting from the three apses, which were removed. The new section was slightly misaligned. The addition was in Gothic style with slender ogival arcades, and is located at the same level as the old presbytery. It has a separate façade with a blind door. A new portal was also added, decorated with Cosmatesque mosaics, dated 1332 and signed by the Roman master Deodato. The portal is flanked by two columns supported by lions; they in turn support two statues, one of the Angel of the Annunciation, the other of the Virgin; both are attributed to Nicola da Guardiagrele. In the middle of the architrave is Niccolò degli Arcioni's coat of arms, between those of Atri and Teramo. The current shape of the new façade, and the Ghibelline merlons, are most likely later additions. In the late 15th century a triangular Gothic tympanum was placed over the portal, housing niches with statues. On the right is the large bell tower.

This was built in the 12th-13th (lower section), 14th (middle section) and 15th centuries (the octagonal lantern, designed by Antonio da Lodi, 1493).

In the 18th century the church was largely modified to adapt it to Baroque style. The columns and the six Romanesque spans were replaced by two cupolas supported by piers; the aisles were lowered, the interior received a stucco decoration, and two portals were opened at the sides of the main portal. The original medieval appearance of the church was restored in the 1930s.

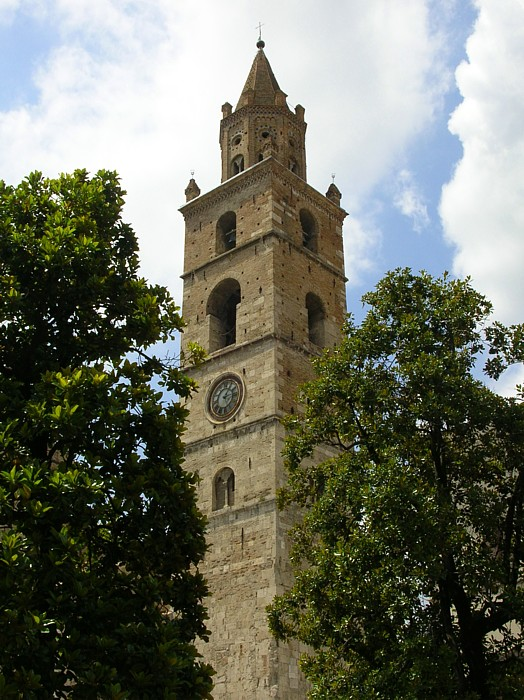
Bell tower

== Artworks ==
Artworks in the church include the silver antependium of the high altar, a masterwork by Nicola da Guardagriele, who worked on it with his workshop from 1433 to 1448. This antependium replaced a previous one, also of precious quality, which had been stolen in 1416 during the troubles following the death of King Ladislaus of Naples.

It is formed by 35 silver sheets in repoussé, placed in four horizontal rows on a wooden base, which are connected at the corners by 22 colorful enamelled tesserae, all within a silver frame added in 1734. The central sheet is double-sized and depicts the Redeemer; it is flanked by the Four Evangelists and the four Doctors of the Church; the last scene represents Saint Francis receiving the stigmata while the others show Jesus' life from the Annunciation to the Pentecost.

Also notable is the large polyptych executed in the late 15th century by Jacobello del Fiore. It shows, in the center, Christ crowned by the Virgin; under them is the representation of the city of Teramo as it was at the time. It was restored in 2023 by the Conservazione dei Beni Culturali (CBC). Other artworks include a 14th-century wooden crucifix (discovered during the 2010 restorations) and the Madonna of the Master of Santa Caterina Gualino (14th century).

== Sources ==
- Johnson, M. J. (1990). "The cathedral of Teramo and its expressions of secular episcopal powers." Studi Medievali. 3° série. 31 (1990), pp. 193–206.
- Savini, Francesco (1900). Il duomo di Teramo: storia e descrizione corredate di documenti e di XIX tavole fototipiche (in Italian). Roma: Forzani e C. Tipografi del Senato.
- Il Duomo di Teramo e i suoi tesori d'arte. Pescara: Carsa. 1993.
