= Diocese of Ascoli Piceno =

Latin Catholic diocese in Italy

Coordinates: 42.8547°N 13.5753°E

Diocese of Ascoli Piceno Dioecesis Asculanus in Piceno

Catholic
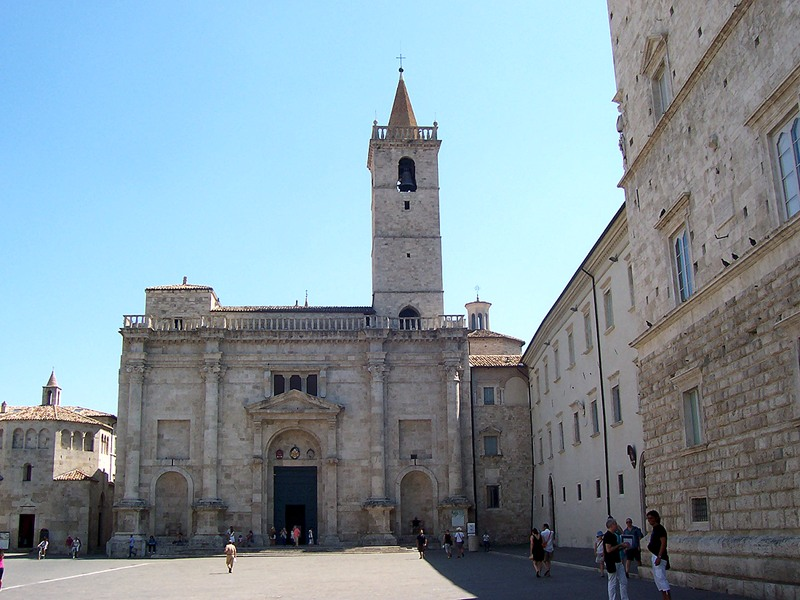
- Cathedral of Ascoli Piceno in the Piazza Arringo

Location
- Country: Italy
- Ecclesiastical province: Fermo

Statistics
- Area: 840 km^{2} (320 sq mi)
- Population: Total; Catholics: (as of 2015); 107,627; 106,352 (98.8%)
- Parishes: 70

Information
- Denomination: Catholic Church
- Sui iuris church: Latin Church
- Rite: Roman Rite
- Established: 4th Century
- Cathedral: Basilica Cattedrale di S. Maria Madre di Dio, S. Emidio
- Secular priests: 72 (diocesan); 27 (Religious Orders)

Current leadership
- Pope: Leo XIV
- Bishop: Gianpiero Palmieri

Map
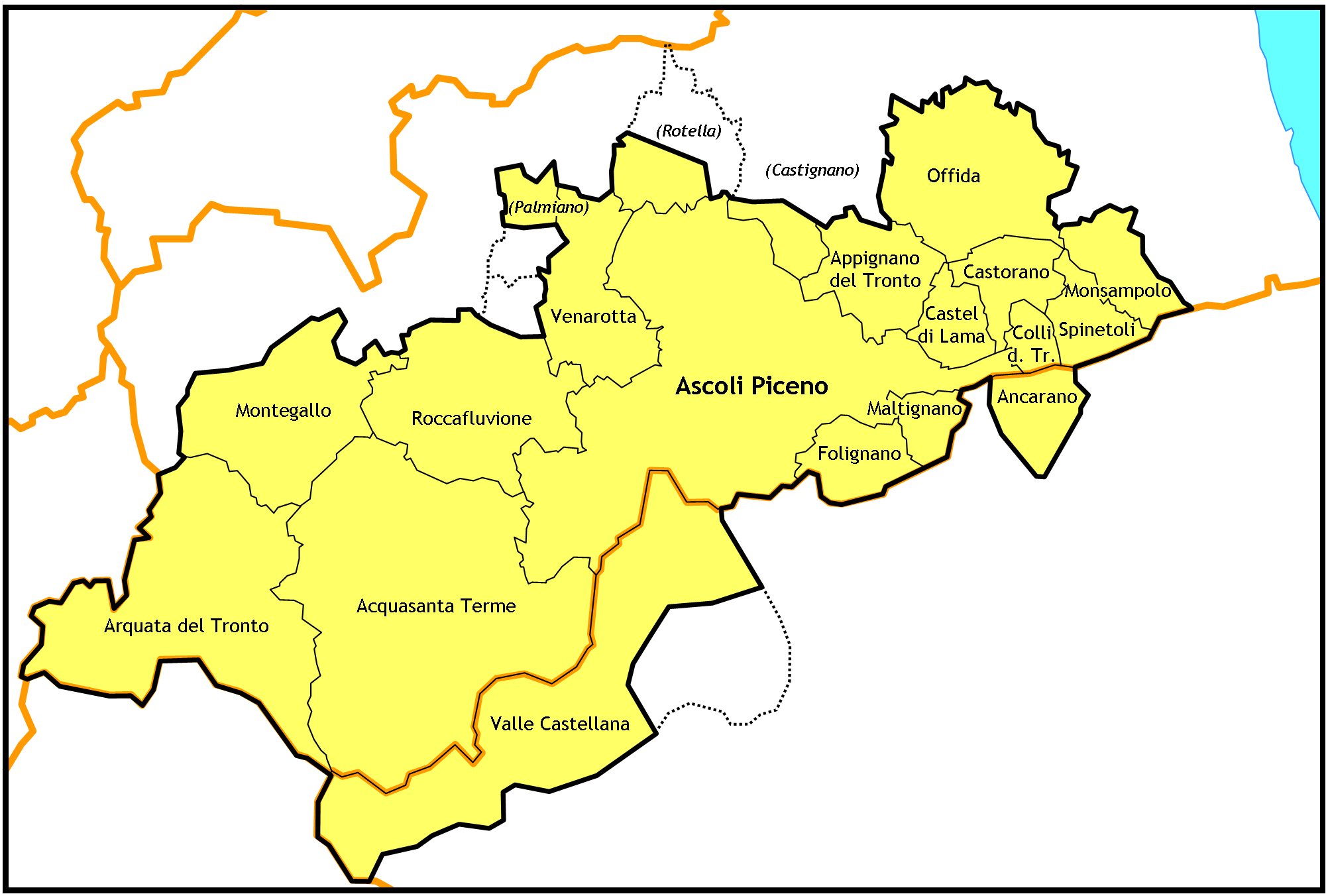

Website
- Diocesi di Ascoli Piceno (in Italian)

The Diocese of Ascoli Piceno (Latin: Dioecesis Asculanus in Piceno) is a Latin Church diocese of the Catholic Church in the Marche in central Italy. It has existed since the fourth century. Historically immediately dependent on the Holy See, it is now a suffragan of the Archdiocese of Fermo. There is, in 2015, one priest for every 1,074 Catholics.

== History ==
The traces of this bishopric appear in the fourth century with St. Emidius, martyred under Diocletian, c. 303; and Claudius, who was allegedly present at the Synod of Rimini in 359, when the Arian heresy was rejected. In the fifth century, Lucentius, who is said to have been present at the Synod of Milan, which sent its synodal letter to Pope Leo I (440-461), was bishop of Ascoli. One of its bishops, Giulio de' Medici, afterwards became Pope Clement VII (1523–1534).

On 11 March 2000, Pope John Paul II raised the bishopric of Pesaro to the rank of metropolitan archbishopric, and created the new ecclesiastical province of Picenum. Ascoli, which had always been directly subject to the Holy See, was assigned to the province of Picenum and placed under the supervision of the archbishop of Pesaro.

=== Cathedral and Chapter ===
The beginnings of the cathedral are attributed archaeologically to the 5th or 6th century.

The cathedral was administered by a corporate body called the Chapter. At Ascoli, the chapter originally consisted of twelve Canons, presided over by the Archdeacon. By 1179, there was also the Archpriest. Subsequently there were three additional dignities (dignitates): the Provost, the Primicerius, and the Mansionarius. After the Council of Trent there was also a Penitentiarius and a Theologus. There were also six (later nine) mansionarii, who saw to the daily operations of the cathedral church, though they were not voting members of the Chapter. In 1737, there were six dignities and fourteen Canons. The Chapter had the right to elect the bishop, and, when a vacancy occurred in the Chapter, the right to elect a successor.

==== The election of 1284–1285 ====
Bishop Raynaldus died in September 1284. A meeting was summoned for all persons concerned. The Archdeacon and Chapter decided to proceed to an election by scrutiny. Three scrutators were chosen, to collect, read, and make public the votes of the Canons. When the votes were announced, six of the twelve Canons had voted for Bonusjoannes, one (Bonusjoannes himself) had voted for Canon Azo, and four Canons had refused to cast a vote for anyone. One of the scrutators, in his own name and in the name of those who had voted for Bonusjoannes, proclaimed him Bishop of Ascoli, and Bonusjoannes accepted his election.

Bonusjoannes then proceeded to Rome to obtain papal approval for his election from Pope Martin IV. There one of the four Canons who had not voted, Abamons by name, contested the election. The Pope therefore handed the case over to Cardinal Giordano Orsini for examination. Orsini cited the persons concerned to appear in open court, and the issue was joined between Bonusjoannes and Abamons. In the event, nothing was produced by Abamons against Bonusjoannes personally or against the electoral proceedings, and therefore Cardinal Orsini, having followed all of the requirements of the law, found in favor of Bonusjoannes. Procurators of Abamons, specially appointed for the purpose, then withdrew his objections to the election. Bonusjoannes was then examined as to his character and qualifications by a committee of cardinals, Latino Malabranca Orsini (Bishop of Ostia), Comes Giusianus (Cardinal Priest of SS. Marcellinus and Petrus), and Cardinal Giordano Orsini (Cardinal Deacon of S. Eustachio), who found electionem ipsam ... de persona ydonea canonice celebratum. Pope Martin then, with the consent of the College of Cardinals, named Bonusjoannes Bishop of Ascoli, and instructed Cardinal Latino Malabranca Orsini to consecrate him a bishop.

Unfortunately, before the bulls of approval and consecration could be issued, Pope Martin died, on 28 March 1285. Pope Honorius IV (Giacomo Savelli) was elected on 2 April 1285. Finally, on 13 December 1285, new bulls were issued for the Bishop-elect, and Pope Honorius granted him the administration of his Church.

=== Diocesan synods ===
A diocesan synod was an irregularly held, but important, meeting of the bishop of a diocese and his clergy. Its purpose was (1) to proclaim generally the various decrees already issued by the bishop; (2) to discuss and ratify measures on which the bishop chose to consult with his clergy; (3) to publish statutes and decrees of the diocesan synod, of the provincial synod, and of the Holy See.

Bishop Pietro Camaiani (1566–1579) presided over a diocesan synod in Ascoli on 22 April 1568.

A diocesan synod was held by Bishop Sigismondo Donati (1605–1641) on 19—21 November 1626. Cardinal Giulio Gabrielli (1642–1668) held a diocesan synod in 1649. Bishop Philippo Monti held a diocesan synod on 7—9 November 1677, and published its constitutions, as well as those of his predecessors Girolamo Berneri, Giulio Gabrielli, and Sigismondo Donati. A diocesan synod was held on 12—14 September 1688 by Bishop Giuseppe Sallustio Fadulfi (1685–1699).

Bishop Giovanni Gambi (1710–1726) held a diocesan synod in the cathedral on 15—17 May 1718. A diocesan synod was held in 1765 by Bishop Pietro Paolo Leonardi (1755–1792)

Bishop Bartolomeo Ortolani (1877–1910) presided over a diocesan synod held in the cathedral on 28—30 October 1903.

== Bishops of Ascoli Piceno ==
=== to 1200 ===
...

- Emidius

...
[Claudius (359)]
...

- Lucentius (attested 451-452 ?)

...
[Quintianus]
...
[Epiphanius]
...

- Justolfus (attested 781, 798/799)

...

- Picco (Ricco) (9th century)

...

- Teuderandus (attested 853)

...

- Arpaldus (attested 879)

...

- Alperinus (attested 968)

...

- Adam (attested 996)

...
Hugo ? (attested 998)

- Emmo (Emino, Emmone) (attested 1003, 1010, 1015, 1019)

...

- Bernardus (attested 1033–1034)
- Bernardus secundus (attested 1045–1069)
- Stephanus (attested 1069)

[Joannes]

- Albericus (attested 1098–1125)
- Presbyter (attested 1131–1165)
- Trasmundus (attested 1177–1179)
- Giso (1179–1183)
- Raynaldus (attested 1185–1198)

Sede vacante (attested 1203)

=== 1200 to 1500 ===
- Rainaldus (attested 1208)
- Petrus (1209–1222)
- Altegrunus (attested 1222)
- Nicolaus (attested 1224–1226)
- Petrus (attested 1228)
- Marcellinus (1230–1236)
- Matthaeus (attested 1238)
- Theodinus (attested 1240–1259)
- Rainaldus, O.Min. (1259–1284)
- Bonusjohannes (1285-1312)
- Bonasengia (1312–1317)
- Rainaldus (1317-1343)
- Isaac Bindi (1344–1353)
- Paulus de Bazzano (1353–1356)
- Isaac Bindi (1356–1358)
- Henricus de Sessa (1358–1362)
- Vitalis, O.S.M. (1362–1363)
- Agapito Colonna (1363–1369)
- Joannes Aquaviva (1369–1374)
- Petrus Torricelli (1374– )
- Antonio Arcioni (1387–1390)
- Thomas Pierleoni (1390–1391) Bishop-elect
- Petrus (attested 1391–1397)
- Benedictus, O.E.S.A. (1398–1399)
- Antonio Arcioni (1399–1405)
- Leonardus Physici (1405–1406)
- Joannes Firmani (1406–1412)
- Nardinus Vanni (1412–1419)
- Petrus Liberotti (1419–1422)
- Paolo Alberti, O.F.M. (1422–1438)
- Pietro Sforza di Cotignola (1438–1442)
- Valentino (1442–1447)
- Angelo Capranica (1447–1450)
- Francesco Monaldeschi (1450–1461)
- Pietro della Valle (1461–1463)
- Prospero Caffarelli (1463–1500)

=== 1500 to 1800 ===
- Giuliano Cesarini, iuniore (14 Feb 1500 – 1 May 1510 Died) (Administrator)
- Lorenzo Fieschi (24 May 1510 –1512)
- Girolamo Ghinucci (Ginucci) (16 Oct 1512 – 30 Jul 1518 Resigned)
- Giulio de' Medici (30 Jul 1518 – 3 Sep 1518 Resigned)
- Filos Roverella (3 Sep 1518 – 1552 Died)
- Lattanzio Roverella (26 Sep 1552 – 1566 Died)
- Pietro Camaiani (7 Oct 1566 – 27 Jul 1579 Died)
- Niccolò Aragonio (Aragona) (3 Aug 1579 – Jul 1586 Died)
- Girolamo Bernerio, O.P. (22 Aug 1586 – 1605 Resigned)
- Sigismondo Donati (7 Jan 1605 – 19 Nov 1641 Died)
- Giulio Gabrielli (10 Feb 1642 – 12 Mar 1668 Appointed Administrator of Rieti)
- Filippo de Monti (2 Jun 1670 – 24 Dec 1680 Died)
- Giuseppe Sallustio Fadulfi (15 Jan 1685 – 6 Jan 1699 Died)
- Giovanni Giuseppe Bonaventura (5 Oct 1699 – Dec 1709 Died)
- Giovanni Gambi (10 Mar 1710 – May 1726 Died)
- Gregorio Lauri (31 Jul 1726 – 3 Mar 1728 Resigned)
- Paolo Tommaso Marana, O.S.B. (8 Mar 1728 – 7 Feb 1755 Died)
- Pietro Paolo Leonardi (1755–1792)

Sede vacante (1792-1795)

- Cardinal Giovanni Andrea Archetti (1795–1805)

=== Since 1800 ===
- Giovanni Francesco Cappelletti (1806–1831)
- Gregorio Zelli, O.S.B. (2 July 1832 – 28 February 1855 Died)
- Carlo Belgrado (28 September 1855 – 25 January 1860 Resigned)
- Elia Antonio Alberini (Alberani), O.C.D. (23 March 1860 – 8 May 1876 Died)
- Amilcare Malagola (26 June 1876 – 1877)
- Bartolomeo Ortolani (21 September 1877 – 6 May 1910 Died)
- Apollonio Maggio (13 May 1910 – 22 October 1927 Died)
- Ludovico Cattaneo, O.Ss.C.A. (6 July 1928 – 10 July 1936 Died)
- Ambrogio Squintani (21 September 1936 – 17 December 1956 Resigned)
- Marcello Morgante (16 February 1957 – 13 April 1991 Retired)
- Pier Luigi Mazzoni (13 April 1991 – 12 February 1997)
- Silvano Montevecchi (30 August 1997 – 27 September 2013 Died)
- Giovanni D'Ercole, F.D.P. (12 April 2014 – 29 October 2020)
- Gianpiero Palmieri (29 October 2021 – Present)

== Bibliography ==
=== Reference works ===
- Gams, Pius Bonifatius (1873). Series episcoporum Ecclesiae catholicae: quotquot innotuerunt a beato Petro apostolo. Ratisbon: Typis et Sumptibus Georgii Josephi Manz. pp. 667–668. (Use with caution; obsolete)
- Eubel, Conradus, ed. (1913). Hierarchia catholica, Tomus 1 (second ed.). Münster: Libreria Regensbergiana. p. . (in Latin)
- Eubel, Conradus, ed. (1914). Hierarchia catholica, Tomus 2 (second ed.). Münster: Libreria Regensbergiana. p. 152.
- Gulik, Guilelmus (1923). Eubel, Conradus (ed.). Hierarchia catholica, Tomus 3 (second ed.). Münster: Libreria Regensbergiana. pp. .
- Gauchat, Patritius (Patrice) (1935). Hierarchia catholica IV (1592-1667). Münster: Libraria Regensbergiana. p. .
- Ritzler, Remigius; Sefrin, Pirminus (1952). Hierarchia catholica medii et recentis aevi V (1667-1730). Patavii: Messagero di S. Antonio. p. .
- Ritzler, Remigius; Sefrin, Pirminus (1958). Hierarchia catholica medii et recentis aevi VI (1730-1799). Patavii: Messagero di S. Antonio. p. .

=== Studies ===
- Cappelletti, Giuseppe (1848). Le chiese d'Italia: dalla loro origine sino ai nostri giorni (in Italian). Vol. Tomo settimo (7). G. Antonelli. pp. 663–795.
- Carducci, Giambattista (1855). Su le memorie e i monumenti di Ascoli nel Piceno (in Italian). Fermo: Saverio Del-Monte.
- Kehr, Paul Fridolin (1909). Italia pontificia Vol. IV (Berlin: Weidmann 1909), pp. 148–157. (in Latin)
- Lanzoni, Francesco (1927). Le diocesi d'Italia dalle origini al principio del secolo VII (an. 604). Faenza: F. Lega, pp. 397–399. (in Italian)
- Luzi, Emidio Parroco (1891). L'università degli studi in Ascoli Piceno (in Italian). Jesi: N.Pierdicchi.
- Luzi, Emidio Parroco (1889). Compendio di storia ascolana (in Italian). Ascoli Piceno: tipografia di E. Cesari.
- Marcucci, Antonio (1766). Saggio delle cose ascolane e de'vescovi di Ascoli nel Piceno (in Italian). Teramo: Consorti, e Felcini.
- Schwartz, Gerhard (1907). Die Besetzung der Bistümer Reichsitaliens unter den sächsischen und salischen Kaisern: mit den Listen der Bischöfe, 951-1122. Leipzig: B.G. Teubner. pp. 225–227. (in German)
- Ughelli, Ferdinando; Coleti, Nicolò (1717). Italia sacra: sive De episcopis Italiae et insularum adjacentium (in Latin). Vol. Tomus primus. Venice: apud Sebastianum Coleti. pp. 436–470.
