= Antonio Fatati =

Italian Catholic bishop

Blessed Antonio Fatati
- Bishop of Ancona e Umana
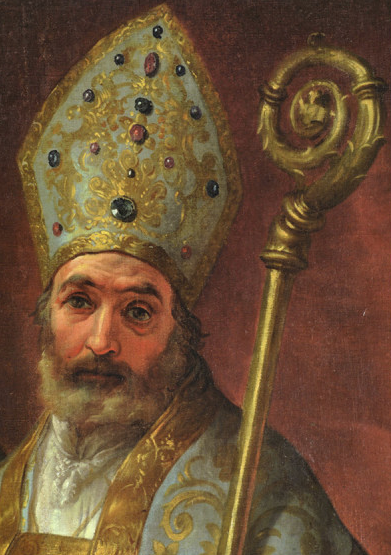
- Blessed Antonio Fatati (by Giuseppe Cades, late 1700s).
- Church: Roman Catholic Church
- Diocese: Ancona e Umana
- See: Ancona e Umana
- Appointed: 3 November 1463
- Term ended: 9 January 1484
- Predecessor: Francesco Monaldeschi
- Successor: Giovanni Antonio Campano
- Previous posts: Bishop of Teramo (1450-60); Auxiliary Bishop of Siena (1460-63)

Personal details
- Born: Antonio Fatati c. 1410 Ancona, Papal States
- Died: 9 January 1484 (aged 74) Ancona, Papal States

Sainthood
- Feast day: 9 January; 2 September (Ancona)
- Venerated in: Roman Catholic Church
- Beatified: 9 May 1795; Saint Peter's Basilica, Papal States by Pope Pius VI
- Attributes: Episcopal attire

Antonio Fatati (c. 1410 – 9 January 1484) was an Italian Catholic bishop who served as the Bishop for Ancona e Umana from 3 November 1463 until his death. Fatati also served as a bishop in both Teramo and Siena; he was an assistant bishop in the latter position to Cardinal Francesco Todeschini Piccolomini (the future Pope Pius III and the nephew to the then-Pope Pius II). He also happened to secure favor from various popes due to his work and important positions within the Papal States; his positions included treasurer and canon among others.

His reputation for holiness was noted throughout his episcopal career and longstanding public devotion to him allowed for Pope Pius VI to confirm his beatification in mid-1795.

== Life ==
Antonio Fatati was born in Ancona in the Papal States circa 1410 to the nobles Simone Fatati and Buzia dei Lavaroni; he came from a line of municipal officials. His two brothers were Marino and Iacopo.

Fatati studied in Bologna before his ordination to the priesthood.

Bishop Astorgio Agnesi appointed him as a canon and archpriest for the San Ciriaco cathedral on 5 November 1431 while he served as the vicar general for Ragusa from 1440 to October 1441 to replace Archbishop Antonio Venieri (his sister-in-law's uncle). Pope Eugene IV appointed him as an abbot for the San Pietro al Conero convent in 1440. Pope Nicholas V also held Fatati in high esteem and appointed him a canon of the chapter of Saint Peter's Basilica on 4 June 1447 while giving him other important positions in the Papal States. The pope also made him a cleric in the Apostolic Camera in 1449. The King of Naples Alfonso V of Aragon became impressed with Fatati and made him one of his councilors in 1456.

He received his appointment from Pope Nicholas V as the Bishop for Teramo on 6 November 1450 but was forced to reside in Macerata given his other duties in service to the Papal States. He did not believe he could run a diocese when he learnt about his appointment due to his several other important positions that confined him to Macerata instead. Fatati also convoked a diocesan synod on 11 March 1459 which the new Pope Pius II appreciated due to Fatati's desire for diocesan reform and renewal. His tenure lasted until 1460 when Pope Pius II made him an assistant bishop for Siena to help his nephew Cardinal Francesco Todeschini Piccolomini (the future Pope Pius III). The pope was impressed with Fatati's management that he appointed him as the Bishop for Ancona e Unama on 3 November 1463 (he held this position until his death). Fatati accompanied Pius II to the Mantua Congress in 1459 while hosting the pope in his diocese; the pope died there in 1464 in the middle of planning a crusade against the Ottoman Turks. Pope Paul II also was impressed with his abilities and named him as the treasurer for Bologna for the 1466 to 1470 period while his successor Pope Sixtus IV also valued his management and diocesan organization.

Fatati died in his diocese on 9 January 1484; his remains were interred in the diocesan cathedral. His remains were found incorrupt after their exhumation in 1529 while a new sarcophagus was commissioned in 1795.

== Beatification ==
The formal cause for his eventual beatification was launched in 1652 and culminated when Pope Pius VI beatified him on 9 May 1765.
