= Giantommaso Gastaldi =

Italian Roman Catholic prelate

Most Reverend Giantommaso Gastaldi
- Bishop of Brugnato
- Church: Catholic Church
- Diocese: Diocese of Brugnato
- In office: 1652–1655
- Predecessor: Francesco Durazzi
- Successor: Giovanni Battista Paggi (bishop)

Orders
- Consecration: 1 September 1652 by Fabio Chigi

Personal details
- Born: 1597 Alassio Albinganen, Italy
- Died: 1655 (age 58) Brugnato, Italy

Giantommaso Gastaldi, O.P. (1597–1655) was a Roman Catholic prelate who served as Bishop of Brugnato (1652–1655).

== Biography ==
Giantommaso Gastaldi was born in Alassio Albinganen, Italy in 1597 and ordained a priest in the Order of Preachers. On 26 August 1652, he was appointed during the papacy of Pope Innocent X as Bishop of Brugnato. On 1 September 1652, he was consecrated bishop by Fabio Chigi, Cardinal-Priest of Santa Maria del Popolo, with Ranuccio Scotti Douglas, Bishop Emeritus of Borgo San Donnino, and Carlo Carafa della Spina, Bishop of Aversa, serving as co-consecrators. He served as Bishop of Brugnato until his death in 1655.

== External links and additional sources ==
- Cheney, David M. "Diocese of Brugnato". Catholic-Hierarchy.org. (for Chronology of Bishops) ^{[self-published]}
- Chow, Gabriel. "Diocese of Brugnato (Italy)". GCatholic.org. (for Chronology of Bishops) ^{[self-published]}

Catholic Church titles
Preceded by Francesco Durazzi	Bishop of Brugnato; 1652–1655	Succeeded by Giovanni Battista Paggi (bishop)
