= Andrew II, Archbishop of Antivari =

Roman Catholic archbishop

Andrew II, also known as Andrew da Mule, O.F.M., (Serbian: Andrija II; died 1462 in Rome) was a Franciscan priest who served as an archbishop of Bar, Montenegro, also known as Antivari, in the mid-15th century.

On April 19, 1448, Pope Nicholas V appointed Andrew II as Archbishop of Antivari. He was consecrated in Rome on May 5, 1448.

His Principal Consecrator was Bishop Niccolò Ruggeri, O.F.M., Bishop of Bagnoregio (Bagnorea); his Co-Consecrators were Bishop Antonio Severini, Bishop of Gubbio, and Bishop Cornelius O’Cunlis, O.F.M., Bishop of Emly.

Under Andrew's permission, the Church of Saint Nicholas near the fortification of the city of Antivari was given to Conventual Franciscans, and there they built a monastery.

In the course of the year 1450, Andrew II served as Skanderbeg's ambassador to the Pope. Two years later, Andrew participated in the reconciliation between the Albanian Dukagjini and Kastrioti clans in Dyrrhachium.

In 1459, Andrew resigned as Archbishop and relocated himself to Rome, where he died in 1462.
