= Prospero Caffarelli (died 1500) =

Italian Roman Catholic bishop

Prospero Caffarelli (died 14 February 1500) was an Italian Roman Catholic bishop. From 11 December 1463 until his death he was bishop of Ascoli Piceno.

== External links and additional sources ==
- Cheney, David M. "Diocese of Ascoli Piceno". Catholic-Hierarchy.org. (for Chronology of Bishops)
- Chow, Gabriel. "Diocese of Ascoli Piceno (Italy)". GCatholic.org. (for Chronology of Bishops)
