= Diocese of Ario =

Former Roman Catholic diocese in Greece (1300-1551)

The Roman Catholic Diocese of Ario was a Latin Rite Catholic diocese in Greece.

== History ==
The bishopric was established in 1300.

It was suppressed on 5 October 1551, its title and territory being merged into the Roman Catholic Diocese of Retimo–Ario on Crete.

== Bishops ==
- Lazzaro (? – ?)
- Reprandino di Santa Lucia, Friars Minor O.F.M. (1349.07.08 – 1352.05.25), later Bishop of La Canea (Cydonioa, Greece) (1352.05.25 – ?)
- Andrea (1352.05.25 – ?)
- Gerardo di Bologna, Augustinians O.E.S.A. (1357.03.01 – ?)
- Francesco di Vilano, O.F.M. (1372.03.09 – ?)
- Antonio Contareno (1384 – 1386.04.06), later Metropolitan Archbishop of Crete (Greece) (1386.04.06 – 1387.03.16)
- Francesco, Carmelites O. Carm. (1388? – 1409?)
- Rolando (1409? – ?)
- Franchione Secreti, O.F.M. (1410.07.28 – 1414.04.02), later Bishop of Milopotamus (1414.04.02 – death 1437)
- Bertramino di Serafini, O.F.M. (1414.07.30 – ?)
- Antonio Guido, Dominican Order (O.P.) (1418.12.14 – 1421)
- Jean de Chorono, O.P. (1421.04.21 – 1432)
- Giovanni Vanni, O.F.M. (1432 – death 1433)
- Nicola Salma di Candia, O.F.M. (1433.11.16 – death 1434)
- Benedetto Paconati, O.P. (1434.09.22 – 1438.01.10), later Bishop of Bagnoregio (Italy, 1438.01.10 – 1445)
- Antonio Mina di Candia, O.F.M. (1438.11.03 – ?)
- Philippe Bartolomei (1469.04.23 – 1480.04.14), later Bishop of Hierapetra (1480.04.14 – ?)
- Giorgio (1480.04.14 – ?)
- Carlo Roselli (1484.10.14 – ?)
- Bartolomeo Siringi (seniore) (1520.06.01 - 1536.11.06 Appointed, Bishop of Castellaneta)
- Marco Adantino, O.F.M. Obs. (1537.12.05 - 1538.02.20 Appointed, Bishop of Chiron)
- Ludovico de Martinis, O.P. (1538.10.07 - 1541 Died)
- Francisco Frías (14.11.1544 - 1550 Resigned)

...
