= Diocese of Teramo-Atri =

Latin Catholic diocese in Italy

Coordinates: 42.6589°N 13.7039°E

Diocese of Teramo-Atri Dioecesis Aprutina seu Teramensis-Hatriensis seu Atriensis

Catholic
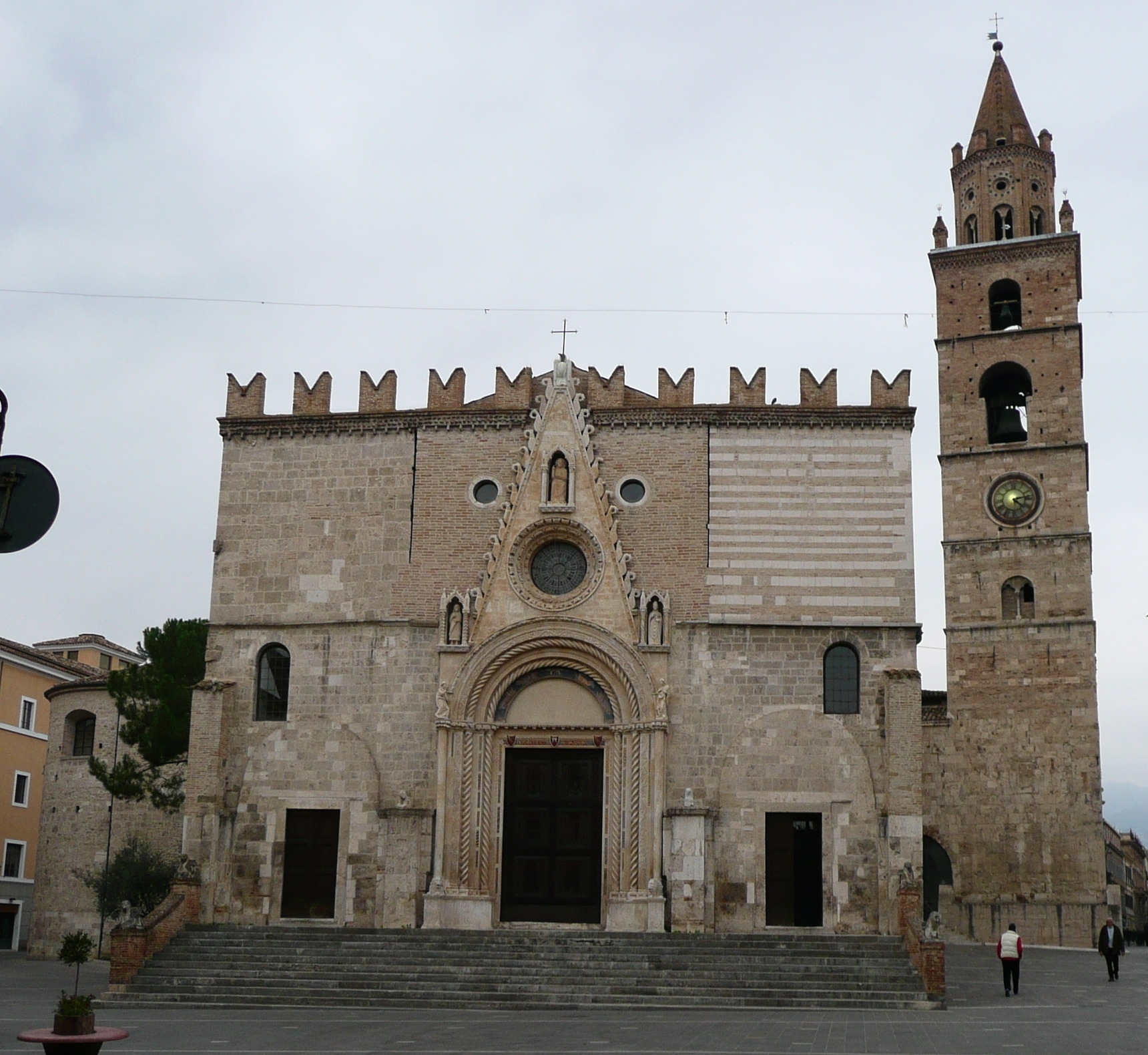
- Teramo Cathedral

Location
- Country: Italy
- Ecclesiastical province: Pescara-Penne

Statistics
- Area: 1,480 km^{2} (570 sq mi)
- Population: Total; Catholics: (as of 2023); 219,300 (est.) ▼; 217,400 (guess) ▼
- Parishes: 187

Information
- Denomination: Catholic Church
- Sui iuris church: Latin Church
- Rite: Roman Rite
- Established: 5th century
- Cathedral: Basilica Cattedrale di S. Maria Assunta (Teramo)
- Co-cathedral: Basilica Concattedrale di S. Maria Assunta (Atri)
- Secular priests: 106 (diocesan) ▼44 (Religious Orders); 12 Permanent Deacons

Current leadership
- Pope: Leo XIV
- Bishop: Lorenzo Leuzzi
- Bishops emeritus: Michele Seccia

Map
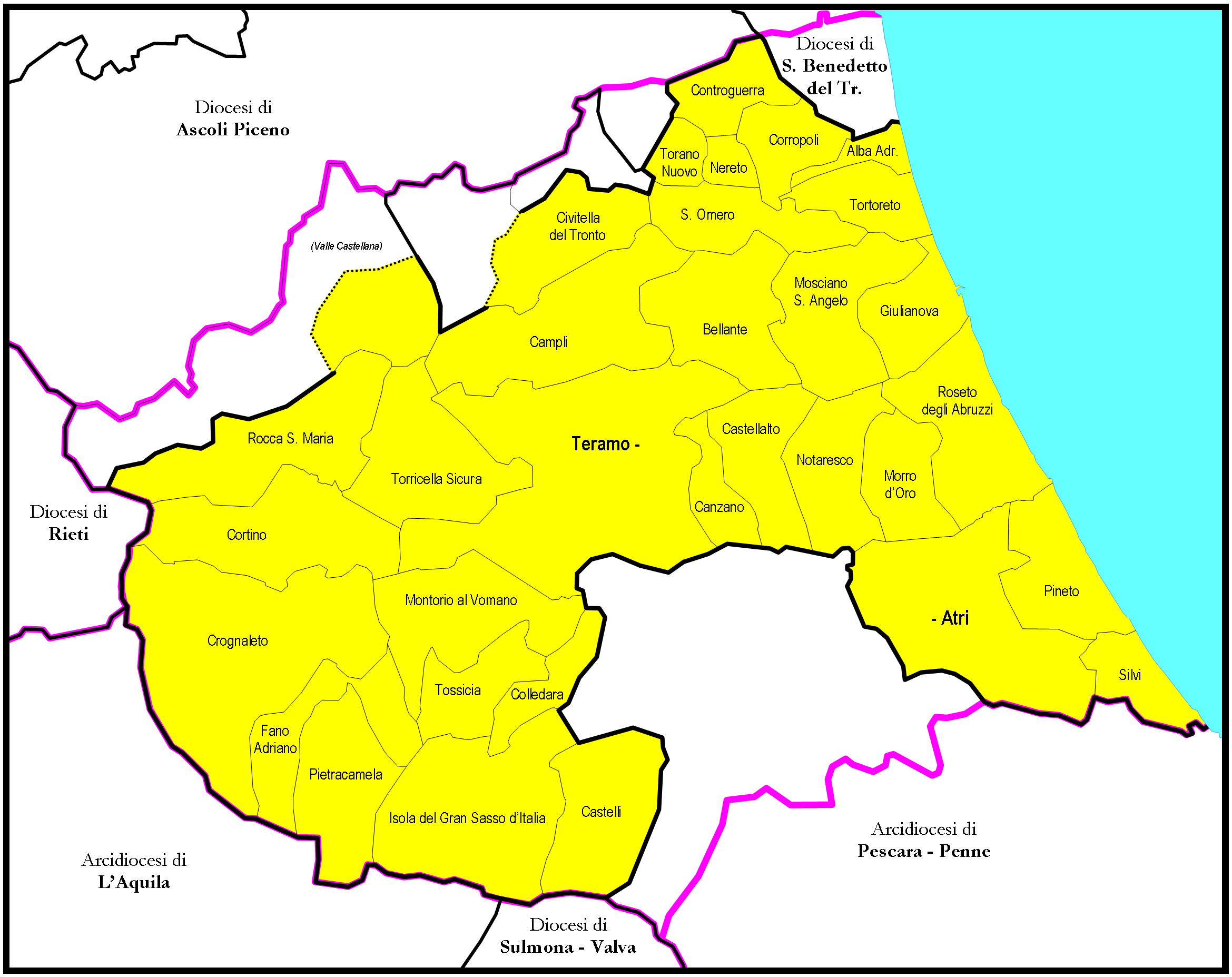

Website
- www.diocesiteramoatri.it

The Diocese of Teramo-Atri (Latin: Dioecesis Aprutina seu Teramensis-Hatriensis seu Atriensis) is a Latin Church diocese of the Catholic Church in Abruzzo, central Italy. The current extent of the diocese was established in 1949, when the historic Diocese of Teramo was combined with the Diocese of Penne-Atri, in the Abruzzo. It is suffragan of the Archdiocese of Pescara-Penne.

== History ==
After the invasion of Italy by the Lombards, Teramo became the residence of a gastald, depending on the Duke of Spoleto; under the Franks it was annexed by the Normans. In 1155 Count Robert II of Loritello rebelled against King Roger II of Sicily and destroyed the city, soon rebuilt through the efforts of Bishop Guido (1122), for which he and his successors were granted the investiture of the principality. In 1215 the privilege was granted to the bishops of Teramo by Frederick II, Holy Roman Emperor of celebrating their first solemn Mass armed and having arms also on the altar. Pope Clement VII dispensed Bishop Francesco Cherigatto from observing the custom in a brief of 15 January 1524; the practice was finally abolished in 1554. Hardly had the town risen again when it began a series of quarrels with Ascoli, which more than once threatened to become sanguinary. Teramo resisted till the end of 1270 during the Angevin invasion. A little later the bishops abandoned their temporal sovereignty and a royal captain was installed.

In the beginning of the 15th century the Melatino, di Janni, and Acquaviva began to struggle for possession of the town. In 1416 it was sacked by Lordino de Saligny, a Frenchman, exasperated at being deprived of the title of High Constable of the kingdom of Naples. During the pillage the treasures of the cathedral disappeared.

A census book of the bishops of Teramo, which was revised under Bishop Francesco Cherigatto (1522–1539), provides extensive information on the organization of the diocese, and on its churches, chapels, and property.

In 1818 the diocese of Campli was incorporated into the See of Teramo.

In 1949 the diocese of Teramo was affected by changes brought about by movements of population as well as the new political structure of the Abruzzi brought about by the Fascists, the end of the Kingdom of Italy, and the creation of the Italian Republic. As the capital of a province, Pescara deserved to become the seat of a bishop; but the city extended over two different dioceses, Chieti and Penne. Pope Pius XII therefore decided on the rearrangement of the diocesan system, which he effected in the Bull Dioecesium subscriptiones of 1 July 1949.

The seat of the diocese of Penne e Atri was transferred from Penne to the city of Pescara, and its name changed to Pinnensis-Piscarensis. The cathedral in Penne was named a co-cathedral. The diocesan seminary was transferred to Pescara. These decisions left status of the diocese of Atri in question. Since the diocese of Atri was entirely in the civil province of Teramo, Atri was united aequaliter principaliter with the diocese of Teramo, forming the diocese of Teramo e Atri.

In 1986, the name of the diocese of Teramo e Atri (Aprutina et Hatriensis) was changed to Teramo-Atri. This meant a major change in the organization of the dioceses. A decree approved by Pope John Paul II in an audience of 27 September 1986, and published by the Congregation of Bishops on 30 September, cancelled the union of the two dioceses under one bishop aequaliter principaliter. Atri was subsumed into the diocese of Teramo. The former cathedral of Atri was allowed to call itself a co-cathedral, and its Chapter was named the Chapter of the Co-cathedral; but there was only one diocesan cathedral at Teramo, and its Chapter was the one diocesan Chapter. There was to be one episcopal curia, one ecclesiastical tribunal, one college of Consultors, one Council of Priests, and one seminary, all of which were at Teramo or a place designated by the bishop. Priests and deacons were to be incardinated in the new Diocese of Teramo-Atri.

The diocese currently (2019) has five seminarians.

== Bishops ==
=== Diocese of Teramo ===
==== to 1450 ====
...
Sede vacante (598)

- Opportunus (attested 601)

...

- Sigismundus (attested 844)

...

- Joannes (attested 879)

...

- Landulfus (attested 948, 963)

...

- Petrus (attested 976, 1036)

...

- Bertoldus (attested 1075)

...

- Ugo (attested 1086)

...

- Sanso (attested 1041)

...

- Petrus (attested 1056–1065)

...

- Guido (attested 1100/1101)
- Ubertus (attested 1103, 1105, 1108, 1114)
- Berardus (1116–1122)

...

- Guido (attested 1153)
- Dionysius (1170–1174)
- Atto (attested 1203)
- Saxo (1205–1220)
- Atto (1221– c. 1230/1232)
- Silvester (by 1232–1235)
- Atto
- Matthaeus de Bellanto
- Gentilis de Sulmona (1267–1272)
- Rainaldus de Barili (1272–1282)
- Rogerius (1282–1294)

Sede vacante (1294–1295)

- Franciscus (1295–1300)
- Rainaldus de Aquaviva (1301–1314)

Sede vacante (1314–1317)

- Nicolaus Arcioni (1317–1355)
- Stephanus de Teramo (1355–1363)
- Pietro de Valle (1363–1396)
- Conradus de Melatino (1396–1405)
- Antonio de Melatino (1405–1407) Administrator
- Marinus de Tocco (1407–1411)
- Stephanus de Carraria (1412–1427)
- Benedictus Guidalotti (1427–1429)
- Jacobus de Seranthonio (1429–1443)
- Francesco Monaldeschi (1443–1450)

==== 1450 to 1700 ====
- Antonio Fatati (1450–1463)
- Giovanni Antonio Campani (1463–1477)
- Francesco de Perez (1479 –1489)
- Giovanni Battista Petrucci (Petruzzi) (1489–1493)
- Filippo Porcelli (18 Oct 1493 – 1517 Died)
- Camillo Porzj (1517–1522)
- Francesco Cherigatto (1522–1539)
- Bartolomeo Guidiccioni (1539–1542) Administrator
- Bernardino Silverii-Piccolomini (1542–1545)
- Giacomo Savelli (13 Apr 1545 – 26 May 1546 Resigned)
- Giovanni Giacomo Barba, O.E.S.A. (1546–1553)
- Giacomo Silverii-Piccolomini (1553–1581)
- Giulio Ricci (1581–1592)
- Vincenzo Bugiatti da Montesanto, O.P. (1592–1609)
- Giambattista Visconti, O.S.A. (16 Mar 1609 – 11 May 1638 Died)
- Girolamo Figini-Oddi (1639–1659)
- Angelo Mausoni (1659–1665)
- Filippo de Monti (1666–1670)
- Giuseppe Armenio (Armenij) (1670–1693)
- Leonardo Cassiani (1693–1715)

==== 1700 to 1950 ====
- Giuseppe Riganti (1719–1720)
- Francesco Maria Tansi (1721–1723 Died)
- Pietro Agostino Scorza (Scortia) (1724–1731)
- Tommaso Alessio de’ Rossi (1731–1749)
- Panfilo Antonio Mazzara (1749–1766)
- Ignazio Andrea Sambiase, C.R. (1767–1776)
- Luigi Maria Pirelli, C.R. (1777–1804)
- Francesco Antonio Nanni, C.M. (1805–1822)
- Giuseppe Maria Pezzella, O.E.S.A. (1823–1828)
- Alessandro Berettini (1830–1849)
- Pasquale Taccone (30 Sep 1850 Confirmed – 20 Oct 1856 Died)
- Michele Milella, O.P. (20 Jun 1859 Confirmed – 2 Apr 1888 Died)
- Francesco Trotta (1 Jun 1888 – Jan 1902 Retired)
- Alessandro Beniamino Zanecchia-Ginnetti, O.C.D. (13 Jul 1902 – 21 Feb 1920 Died)
- Settimio Quadraroli (26 Aug 1921 – 4 Aug 1927 Died)
- Antonio Micozzi (23 Dec 1927 – 4 Sep 1944 Died)
- Gilla Vincenzo Gremigni, M.S.C. (18 Jan 1945 – 1951)

=== Diocese of Teramo e Atri ===
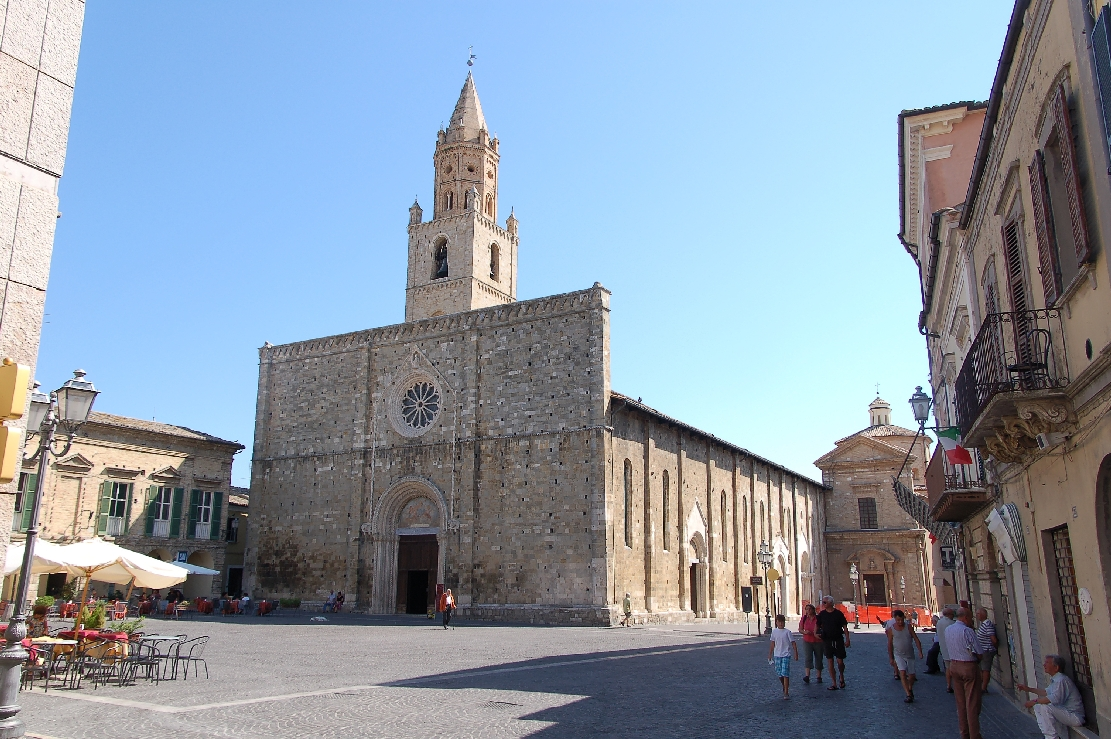
Co-cathedral in Atri

Immediately Subject to the Holy See

- Stanislao Amilcare Battistelli, C.P. (14 Feb 1952 – 22 Feb 1967 Retired)
- Abele Conigli (16 Feb 1967 – 31 Dec 1988 Retired)

=== Diocese of Teramo-Atri ===
Organization changed: 30 September 1986

- Antonio Nuzzi (31 Dec 1988 – 24 Aug 2002 Retired)
- Vincenzo D’Addario (24 Aug 2002 – 1 Dec 2005 Died)
- Michele Seccia (24 Jun 2006 – 29 Sept 2017)
- Lorenzo Leuzzi (23 November 2017 – )

== Bibliography ==
=== Reference works for bishops ===
- Gams, Pius Bonifatius (1873). Series episcoporum Ecclesiae catholicae: quotquot innotuerunt a beato Petro apostolo (in Latin). Ratisbon: Typis et Sumptibus Georgii Josephi Manz. pp. 931–932.
- Eubel, Conradus, ed. (1913). Hierarchia catholica (in Latin). Vol. Tomus 1 (second ed.). Münster: Libreria Regensbergiana. (in Latin)
- Eubel, Conradus, ed. (1914). Hierarchia catholica (in Latin). Vol. Tomus 2 (second ed.). Münster: Libreria Regensbergiana.
- Eubel, Conradus; Gulik, Guilelmus (1923). Hierarchia catholica (in Latin). Vol. Tomus 3 (second ed.). Münster: Libreria Regensbergiana.
- Gauchat, Patritius (Patrice) (1935). Hierarchia catholica. Vol. Tomus IV (1592-1667). Münster: Libraria Regensbergiana.
- Ritzler, Remigius; Sefrin, Pirminus (1952). Hierarchia catholica medii et recentis aevi. Vol. Tomus V (1667-1730). Patavii: Messagero di S. Antonio.
- Ritzler, Remigius; Sefrin, Pirminus (1958). Hierarchia catholica medii et recentis aevi. Vol. Tomus VI (1730-1799). Patavii: Messagero di S. Antonio.
- Ritzler, Remigius; Sefrin, Pirminus (1968). Hierarchia Catholica medii et recentioris aevi (in Latin). Vol. VII (1800–1846). Monasterii: Libreria Regensburgiana.
- Remigius Ritzler; Pirminus Sefrin (1978). Hierarchia catholica Medii et recentioris aevi (in Latin). Vol. VIII (1846–1903). Il Messaggero di S. Antonio.
- Pięta, Zenon (2002). Hierarchia catholica medii et recentioris aevi (in Latin). Vol. IX (1903–1922). Padua: Messagero di San Antonio. ISBN 978-88-250-1000-8.

=== Studies ===
- Cappelletti, Giuseppe (1870). Le chiese d'Italia (in Italian). Vol. vigesimoprimo (XXI). Venezia: G. Antonelli. pp. 427–443.
- Johnson, M. J. (1990). "The cathedral of Teramo and its expressions of secular episcopal powers." Studi Medievali. 3° série. 31 (1990), pp. 193–206.
- Kehr, Paul Fridolin (1909). Italia pontificia Vol. IV (Berlin: Weidmann 1909), pp. 283–309. (in Latin)
- Lanzoni, Francesco (1927). Le diocesi d'Italia dalle origini al principio del secolo VII (an. 604). Faenza: F. Lega; p. 399. (in Italian)
- Palma, Niccola (1832). Storia ecclesiastica e civile della regione più settentrionale del Regno di Napoli, detta dagli Antichi Praetutium, ne'bassi tempi Aprutium oggi Città di Teramo, e diocesi Aprutina (in Italian). Vol. I. Teramo: Ubaldo Angeletti. Palma, Niccola (1832). Volume II. Palma, Niccola (1833). Volume III. Palma, Niccola (1834). Volume IV. Palma, Niccola (1836). Volume V.
- Palma, Niccola (1890). Storia ecclesiastica e civile della regione piú settentrionale del regno di Napoli: detta dagli antichi Praetutium, né bassi tempi Aprutium oggi città di Teramo e diocesi Aprutina (in Italian). Vol. I (seconda ed.). Teramo: G. Fabbri.
- Savini, Francesco (1900). Il duomo di Teramo: storia e descrizione corredate di documenti e di XIX tavole fototipiche (in Italian). Roma: Forzani e C. Tipografi del Senato.
- Savini, Francesco. Il cartulario della chiesa Teramana (Rome 1910) (in Italian and Latin)
- Schwartz, Gerhard (1907). Die Besetzung der Bistümer Reichsitaliens unter den sächsischen und salischen Kaisern: mit den Listen der Bischöfe, 951-1122. Leipzig: B.G. Teubner. pp. 238–239. (in German)
- Ughelli, Ferdinando; Coleti, Niccolò (1717). Italia sacra, sive De Episcopis Italiae (in Latin). Vol. Tomus primus (secunda ed.). Venice: apud Sebastianum Coleti. pp. 342–373.
