= Sperelli =

Sperelli is a surname. Notable people with the surname include:

- Alessandro Sperelli (1589–1671), Italian Roman Catholic prelate
- Anselmo Sperelli (fl. 1500s), Italian Roman Catholic prelate
- Cesare Sperelli (1639–?), Italian Roman Catholic prelate
- Giovanni Ottavio Manciforte Sperelli (1730–1781), Italian Roman Catholic bishop
