= Ignacio Carrasco de Paula =

The Most Reverend Ignacio Carrasco de Paula
- Titular Bishop of Thapsus
- Appointed: 15 September 2010
- Predecessor: Vladas Michelevicius
- Previous post: President of the Pontifical Academy for Life (2010–16)

Orders
- Ordination: 8 August 1966
- Consecration: 9 October 2010 by Tarcisio Bertone

Personal details
- Born: Ignacio Carrasco de Paula; 25 October 1937 (age 89) Barcelona, Spain

Styles of Ignacio Carrasco de Paula
- Reference style: The Most Reverend
- Spoken style: Your Excellency
- Religious style: Monsignor

Ignacio Carrasco de Paula (born 25 October 1937) is a Spanish prelate of the Catholic Church. He has been a bishop since 2010. He was the president of the Pontifical Academy for Life from 2010 to 2016.

== Life ==
=== Early life and priesthood ===
Carrasco de Paula was born in Barcelona, Spain. He was ordained a priest for the Personal Prelature of Opus Dei on 8 August 1966 at the age of 28. From 1984 he was professor of moral theology at the Pontifical University of the Holy Cross and from 1984 to 1994 he was the rector of the university. He was also director of the Bioethics Institute of the Università Cattolica del Sacro Cuore in Rome and is a member of the ethics committee of the experimentation clinic at the Gemelli Policlinic in Rome.

He began working a consultor for the Academy for Life when it was established by Pope John Paul II in 1994. He served as its chancellor from 3 January 2005 until his appointment as president on 30 June 2010. He said his immediate focus would be on two subjects–post abortion syndrome and umbilical cord banks–and he criticised Spain's recently enacted legislation legalizing abortion.

=== Episcopate ===
On 15 September 2010, Pope Benedict XVI named him Titular Bishop of Thapsus. He received his episcopal ordination from Cardinal Tarcisio Bertone on 9 October.

In October 2010 Bishop Carrasco de Paula criticised a decision to award the Nobel Prize for Medicine to Robert Edwards for his work on in vitro fertilization. Carrasco de Paula said: "I find the choice of Robert Edwards completely out of order. Without Edwards, there would not be a market on which millions of ovocytes are sold ... and there would not be a large number of freezers filled with embryos in the world. In the best of cases they are transferred into a uterus, but most probably they will end up abandoned or dead, which is a problem for which the new Nobel Prize winner is responsible."

In August 2011, Carrasco de Paula said, "The reaction to the news of becoming a mother should return to being what it has always been, a reaction of joy" that leads us to say "congratulations". He added that the response to a mother should not be "'I'm so sorry,' like we say to people who get sick." He added that the focus in 2011 has been on three areas: post-abortion trauma, umbilical cord banks and treatments for infertility. Regarding post-abortion trauma, he said it is necessary that the condition be "defined as well as whether or not there is a cure".

In 2012, Professor Josef Seifert, a member of the Academy sharply criticised the leadership of the Academy for its sponsoring a February 2012 conference on infertility and stem cell research, which the Academy had not organized itself, which included speakers who appeared to endorse techniques and methods condemned by the Church. Carrasco de Paula first responded in kind in April and then on 8 May apologized to the members of the academy. He wrote that when he criticised "some pro-life activists" he had employed "unfortunate phrasing which, if misunderstood, could have offended the sensibilities of some persons". He added that he had not meant "to show any disrespect, and certainly not to those with whom we have been collaborating closely and gratefully for years in favour of human life and of its defense."

Pope Francis named Archbishop Vincenzo Paglia to succeed Carrasco de Paula as president of the Academy on 17 August 2016.

Catholic Church titles
Preceded by Salvatore Fisichella	President of the Pontifical Academy for Life; 30 June 2010 – 15 August 2016	Succeeded by Vincenzo Paglia
