= Andreassi =

Andreassi is an Italian surname. Notable people with the surname include:

- Ippolito Andreassi, O.S.B. (1581–1646), Roman Catholic prelate who served as Bishop of Terni
- Raffaele Andreassi (1924–2008), Italian film director
