= Peregrinus, Bishop of Terni =

Saint Peregrinus

Bishop of Terni
- Died: 138
- Venerated in: Roman Catholic Church; Eastern Orthodox Church
- Canonized: Pre-congregation
- Feast: 16 May

Saint Peregrinus was the Bishop of Terni, and was credited for founding the city's cathedral.
