= Giannicolò Conti =

Roman Catholic cardinal (1617–1698)

His Eminence Giannicolò Conti
- Cardinal-Bishop of Sabina; Bishop of Ancona e Numana
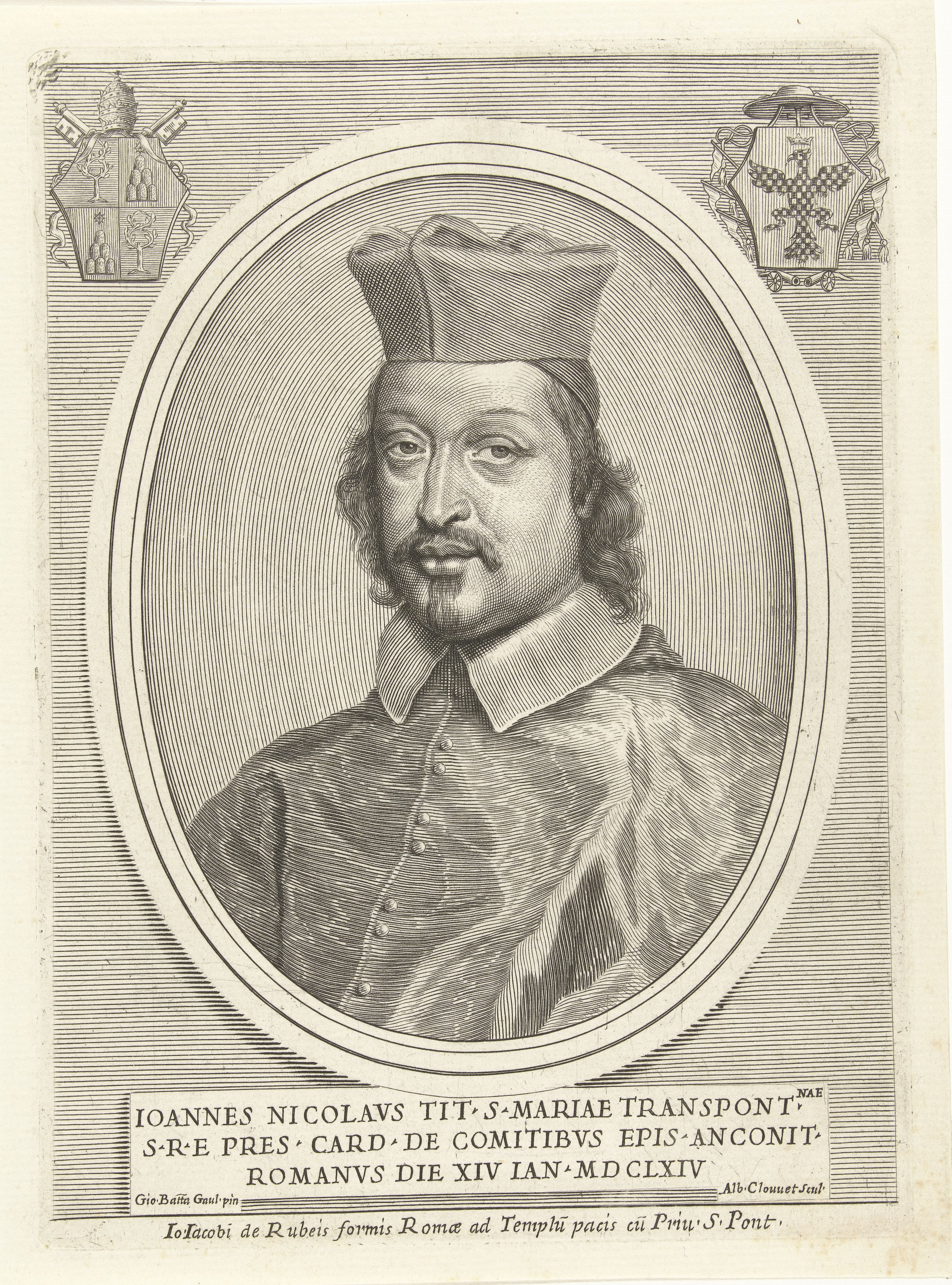
- Church: Catholic Church

Orders
- Consecration: 26 Apr 1639 by Girolamo Farnese

Personal details
- Born: 1617 Poli, Italy
- Died: 20 Jan 1698 (age 81) Ancona, Italy

Giannicolò Conti (1617–1698) was a Roman Catholic cardinal.

== Biography ==
On 26 Apr 1639, was consecrated bishop by Girolamo Farnese, Cardinal-Priest of Sant'Agnese fuori le mura, with Emilio Bonaventura Altieri, Bishop of Camerino, and Federico Borromeo (iuniore), Titular Patriarch of Alexandria, serving as co-consecrators.

While bishop, he was the principal consecrator of Pietro Lanfranconi, Bishop of Terni (1667).

Catholic Church titles
Preceded by Giacomo Corradi	Cardinal-Priest of Santa Maria in Traspontina; 1666–1691	Succeeded by Giuseppe Sacripante
Preceded by Luigi Galli	Bishop of Ancona e Numana; 1666–1698	Succeeded by Marcello d'Aste
Preceded by Paluzzo Paluzzi Altieri Degli Albertoni	Cardinal-Bishop of Sabina; 1691–1698	Succeeded by Gasparo Carpegna
