= John Paul II Pontifical Theological Institute for Marriage and Family Sciences =

Catholic pontifical institute

- Latin: Pontificium Institutum Theologicum pro Scientiis de Matrimonio et Familia sancto Ioanni Paulo II dicatum
- Type: Pontifical university
- Established: 1981 (refounded in 2017)
- Affiliations: Roman Catholic
- Chancellor: Baldassare Reina
- President: Philippe Bordeyne
- Vice-Chancellor: Diocesan ordinary of each session
- Location: Rome, Italy (central session); 41.88456°N 12.50349°E
- Website: https://www.istitutogp2.it/wp/jp2-institute/
- Location within Rome

The John Paul II Pontifical Theological Institute for Marriage and Family Sciences is a Catholic pontifical institute of theological studies on marriage and family with affiliated campuses around the world. Its main headquarters is in Rome.

== History ==
In 1981, Pope John Paul II founded the Pontifical Institute for Studies on Marriage and Family in the Apostolic Constitution Magnum Matrimonii Sacramentum, as part of the effort to develop study on the themes around the marriage and family, as well as Catholic theology on the body.

In 2017, Pope Francis issued a motu proprio Summa familiae cura ("By the greatest concern for the family"), replacing the institute with the John Paul II Pontifical Theological Institute for Marriage and Family Sciences, with a new constitution and mission. (Note: Francis published his letter relaunching the Institute on the first anniversary of a letter sent to him by four cardinals asking him to clarify points he made in Amoris laetitia. La Croix said it "clearly appeared as a response".) It was also affiliated to the Congregation for Catholic Education, Pontifical Academy for Life, and Dicastery for the Laity, Family and Life. The institute's chancellor Archbishop Vincenzo Paglia also anticipated inviting additional faculty and experts in light of the Institute's expanded mandate, including non-Catholics.

== Activities ==
The institute confers degrees including Doctor, Licentiate, and Diploma of Science in Marriage and Family under its own authority.

== Governance ==
The institute's governance is, as a pontifical school, largely made up of Catholic prelates. Since May 2025, the grand chancellor has been Archbishop Baldassare Reina. The Vice-Chancellor of each session is the ordinary of the diocese in which it is located.

=== List of grand chancellors ===
From its founding in 1982 until 2016, the vicar general of Rome held the title of grand chancellor ex officio in his capacity as grand chancellor of the Lateran.

- Ugo Poletti (1982–1991)
- Camillo Ruini (1991–2008)
- Agostino Vallini (2008–2016)
- Vincenzo Paglia (2016–2025)
- Baldassare Reina (2025–present)

=== List of presidents ===
- Carlo Caffarra (1982-1995)
- Angelo Scola (1995-2002)
- Salvatore Fisichella (2002-2006)
- Livio Melina (2006–2016)
- Vincenzo Paglia (15 August 2016 – 26 May 2025)
- Philippe Bordeyne (26 May 2025 – present)

== Locations ==
The institute's locations include:

- Rome, Italy, at the Lateran University (central session)
- Pontifical John Paul II Institute for Studies on Marriage and Family at The Catholic University of America, Washington, DC, United States
- Cotonou, Benin
- Salvador, Bahia, Brazil
- Changanacherry, India
- Mexico City, Mexico
- Guadalajara, Jalisco, Mexico
- Monterrey, Mexico
- León, Guanajuato, Mexico
- Mérida, Yucatán, Mexico
- Valencia, Spain
- Melbourne, Australia (a former associated campus, ceased 2018)
- Bacolod, Negros Occidental, Philippines (Associated Campus)
