= Minucci =

Minucci is an Italian surname. Notable people with the surname include:

- Andrea Minucci (died 1572), Roman Catholic prelate who served as Archbishop of Zadar
- Chieli Minucci (born 1958), American jazz guitarist
- Joe Minucci (born 1981), American football player
- Minuccio Minucci (1551–1604), Italian Roman Catholic priest
- Ulpio Minucci (1917–2007), Italian composer
