= Pietro Bodoni =

Roman Catholic prelate

Most Reverend Pietro Bodoni
- Bishop of Terni
- Church: Catholic Church
- Diocese: Diocese of Terni
- In office: 1506–1509
- Predecessor: Francisco Lloris y de Borja
- Successor: Luigi d'Apera

Personal details
- Died: 1509 Terni, Italy

Pietro Bodoni (died 1509) was a Roman Catholic prelate who served as Bishop of Terni (1506–1509).

== Biography ==
On 29 July 1506, Pietro Bodoni was appointed by Pope Julius II as Bishop of Terni. He served as Bishop of Terni until his death in 1509.

== See also ==
- Catholic Church in Italy

== External links and additional sources ==
- Cheney, David M. "Diocese of Terni-Narni-Amelia". Catholic-Hierarchy.org. (for Chronology of Bishops) ^{[self-published]}
- Chow, Gabriel. "Diocese of Terni-Narni-Amelia (Italy)". GCatholic.org. (for Chronology of Bishops) ^{[self-published]}

Catholic Church titles
Preceded by Francisco Lloris y de Borja	Bishop of Terni; 1506–1509	Succeeded by Luigi d'Apera
