= Ventura Bufalini =

Roman Catholic prelate

Most Reverend Ventura Bufalini
- Bishop of Terni
- Church: Catholic Church
- Diocese: Diocese of Terni
- In office: 1499–1504
- Predecessor: Francisco Lloris y de Borja
- Successor: Francisco Lloris y de Borja
- Previous post: Bishop of Città di Castello (1498–1499)

Personal details
- Died: 15 August 1504 Terni, Italy

Ventura Bufalini (died 15 August 1504) was a Roman Catholic prelate who served as Bishop of Terni (1499–1504) and Bishop of Città di Castello (1498–1499).

== Biography ==
On 18 January 1498, Ventura Bufalini was appointed by Pope Alexander VI as Bishop of Città di Castello. On 17 April 1499, he was appointed by Pope Alexander VI as Bishop of Terni. He served as Bishop of Terni until his death on 15 August 1504.

== See also ==
- Catholic Church in Italy

== External links and additional sources ==
- Cheney, David M. "Diocese of Città di Castello". Catholic-Hierarchy.org. (for Chronology of Bishops) ^{[self-published]}
- Chow, Gabriel. "Diocese of Città di Castello". GCatholic.org. (for Chronology of Bishops) ^{[self-published]}
- Cheney, David M. "Diocese of Terni-Narni-Amelia". Catholic-Hierarchy.org. (for Chronology of Bishops) ^{[self-published]}
- Chow, Gabriel. "Diocese of Terni-Narni-Amelia (Italy)". GCatholic.org. (for Chronology of Bishops) ^{[self-published]}

Catholic Church titles
Preceded by Nicola Ippoliti	Bishop of Città di Castello; 1498–1499	Succeeded by Giulio Vitelli
Preceded by Francisco Lloris y de Borja	Bishop of Terni; 1499–1504	Succeeded by Francisco Lloris y de Borja
