= Giuliano Dati =

Most Reverend Giuliano Dati
- Bishop of San Leone
- Church: Catholic Church
- Diocese: Diocese of San Leone
- In office: 1518–1524
- Successor: Francesco Sperelli

Personal details
- Born: 1445
- Died: 1524 (age 79)

Giuliano Dati (1445-1524) was a Roman Catholic prelate who served as Bishop of San Leone from 1518 to 1524.

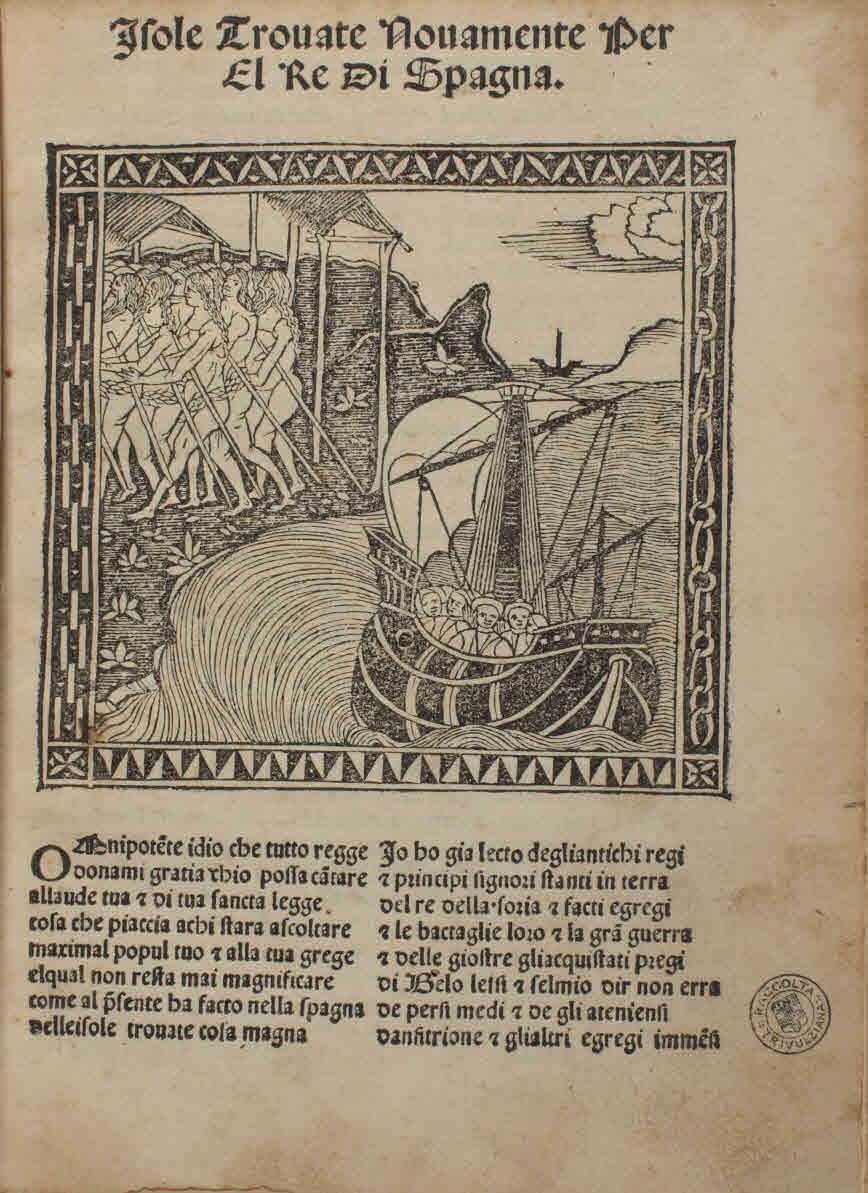
Lettera delle isole nuovamente trovate, 1495

== Biography ==
Giuliano Dati was born in 1445. On 26 Feb 1518, he was appointed during the papacy of Pope Leo X as Bishop of San Leone. He served as Bishop of San Leone until his death in 1524.

Dati is author of three important works. The first is a 1493 adaptation into Italian ottava rima verse of the account of Christopher Columbus on his first voyage across the Atlantic Ocean. The second is the c. 1494 Treatise on the Supreme Prester John, Pope and Emperor of India and Ethiopia in which he poetically adapts earlier descriptions of Prester John and geographically conflates Ethiopia and India. The third is the c. 1495 Second Song of India describing the monsters in Prester John's realm.

== Works ==
- Calculazione delle ecclissi (in Italian). Roma: Johann Besicken. 1493.

Catholic Church titles
Preceded by	Bishop of San Leone; 1518–1524	Succeeded by Francesco Sperelli
