= Pietro Lanfranconi =

Italian Roman Catholic prelate

Most Reverend Pietro Lanfranconi
- Bishop of Terni
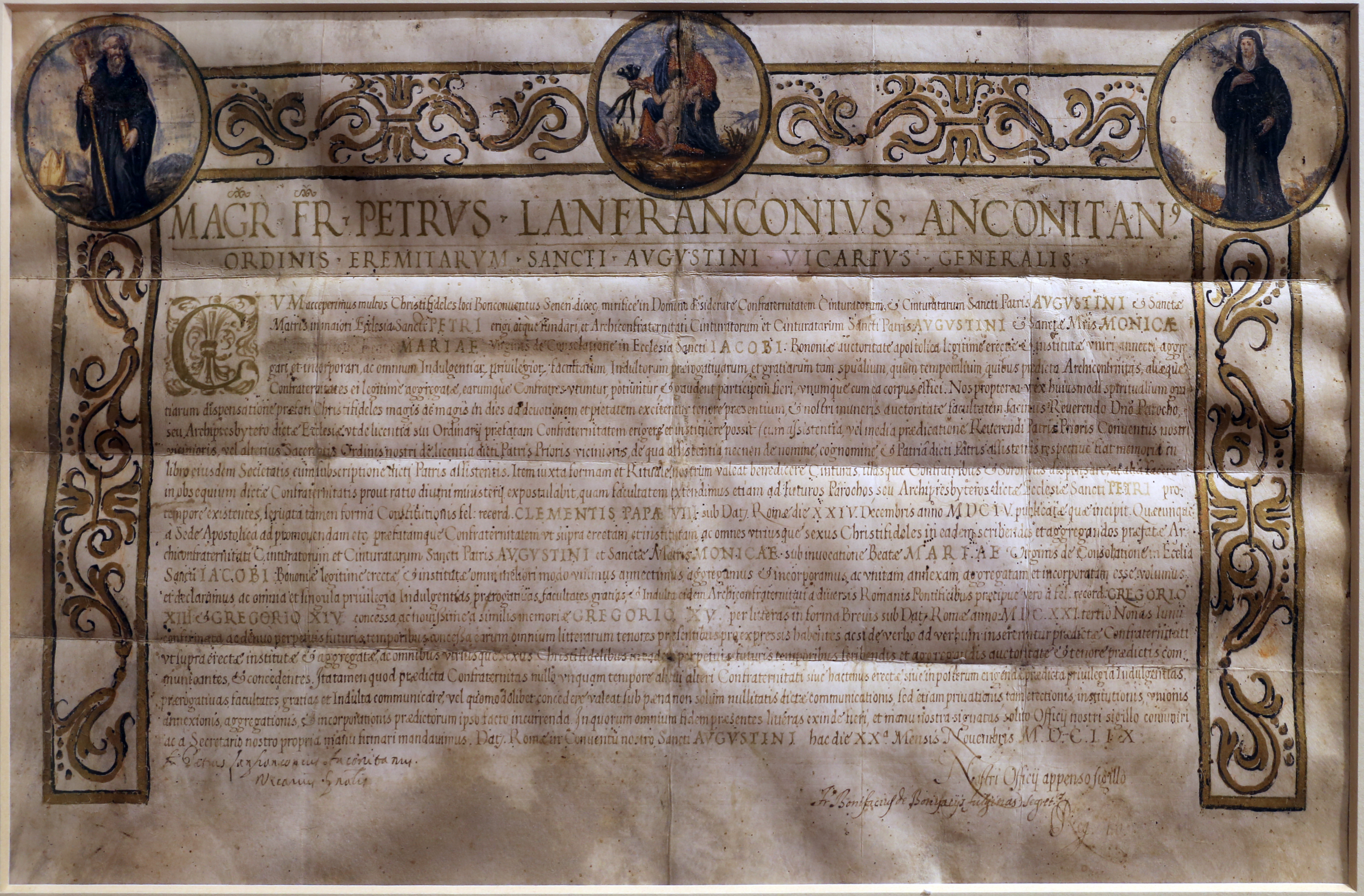
- Pergamene by Pietro Lanfranconi, 20 November 1659.
- Church: Catholic Church
- Diocese: Diocese of Terni
- In office: 1667–1674
- Predecessor: Sebastiano Gentili
- Successor: Carlo Bonafaccia

Orders
- Consecration: 21 August 1667 by Giannicolò Conti

Personal details
- Born: 22 January 1596 Ancona, Italy
- Died: 6 March 1674 (age 78) Terni, Italy

Pietro Lanfranconi, O.S.A. (1596–1674) was a Roman Catholic prelate who served as Bishop of Terni (1667–1674).

He was born in Ancona, Italy on 22 January 1596 and ordained a priest in the Order of Saint Augustine. On 3 August 1667, he was appointed during the papacy of Pope Clement IX as Bishop of Terni. On 21 August 1667, he was consecrated bishop by Giannicolò Conti, Cardinal-Priest of Santa Maria in Traspontina, with Giacomo de Angelis, Archbishop Emeritus of Urbino, Mario Fani, Titular Bishop of Cyrene, serving as co-consecrators. He served as Bishop of Terni until his death on 6 March 1674.

While bishop, he was the principal co-consecrator of Matteo Cosentino, Bishop of Anglona-Tursi (1667); and Alessandro Diotallevi, Bishop of Pesaro (1667).

== External links and additional sources ==
- Cheney, David M. "Diocese of Terni-Narni-Amelia". Catholic-Hierarchy.org. (for Chronology of Bishops) ^{[self-published]}
- Chow, Gabriel. "Diocese of Terni-Narni-Amelia (Italy)". GCatholic.org. (for Chronology of Bishops) ^{[self-published]}

Catholic Church titles
Preceded by Sebastiano Gentili	Bishop of Terni; 1667–1674	Succeeded by Carlo Bonafaccia
