= Alvaro Magelanes =

Historical Roman Catholic religious leader

Most Reverend Alvaro Magelanes
- Bishop of San Leone
- Church: Catholic Church
- Diocese: Diocese of San Leone
- In office: 1565–1571
- Predecessor: Giulio Rossi
- Successor: None

Personal details
- Born: 1500
- Died: 27 November 1571 (aged 70–71) San Leone, Italy

Alvaro Magelanes was a Roman Catholic prelate who served as Bishop of San Leone (1565–1571).

== Biography ==
On 15 May 1565, Alvaro Magelanes was appointed during the papacy of Pope Pius IV as Bishop of San Leone. He served as Bishop of San Leone until his death on 27 Nov 1571.

Catholic Church titles
Preceded by Giulio Rossi	Bishop of San Leone; 1565–1571	Succeeded by None
