= Domnina of Terni =

Saint Domnina of Terni

Martyr, Virgin
- Died: 269 AD; Terni, Italy
- Venerated in: Roman Catholic Church
- Feast: 14 April

Saint Domnina is venerated as a martyr by the Catholic Church. According to tradition, she was martyred at Terni (known as Interamna Nahars in antiquity) along with ten consecrated virgins in the mid-3rd century, at the same time that Saint Valentine, bishop of Terni was killed.

According to one source, "All the Martyrologies commemorate them, but whether there were not in the same locality two or more Virgin-Martyrs by name Domnina is altogether uncertain." According to Ludovico Jacobilli, Domnina's death should be dated later, to the time of Totila (6th century).
