= Francesco Coppini =

Italian prelate (1415(?) - 1464)

Francesco Coppini or dei Coppini (born before 1415 in Prato, died as Ignatius on 29 September 1464 in Rome) was an Italian prelate whom Pope Pius II sent to England in 1459 to arrange a reconciliation between the houses of Lancaster and York during the Wars of the Roses.

== Early life ==
He was born in Prato and is first mentioned as a jurist and chamberlain in Florence in 1433. In 1437, he practised justice in Bologna and entered church services, then went to Florence again where he eventually became a canonicus in Florence. He served as apostolic treasurer in Bologna from 1450 to 1452 as well as in other functions and made several important friends in the clergy. Pope Callistus III appointed him bishop of Terni in 1458.

== Coppini Mission ==
On 7 January 1459 he was appointed as nuncio by Pope Pius II with support from Francesco I Sforza, Duke of Milan. Departing some weeks later, he gave the name to the Coppini Mission to England with the double purpose of bringing about an end to the Wars of the Roses, and persuading King Henry VI of England to join the crusade against the Turks. He was also given instructions to carry out in Burgundy, Cambrai and the Netherlands.

He arrived in Dover on 4 June 1459, then travelled to London, where he initially opened negotiations with Henry VI and delivered his invitation to the Council of Mantua to where Henry had already sent a small and ineffectual delegation on 16 May. The council fell short of achieving the goals of Pius II, among other reasons due to the instable balance between England and France at that time that the English crown needed to maintain.

Regarding the second part of his mission to mediate between York and Lancaster, Coppini was unable to achieve much in his limited role as nuncio instead of a full papal legate. To further his influence on England, Pius II nominated Coppini legate to England and Scotland on 11 December 1459 and asked him to propose another convent in 1460 to the English court. Coppini was also appointed as collector for a special tithe dedicated to battle the Turks.

After his attempts to collect the tithe and proclaim the crusade were rebuffed by Queen Margaret of Anjou in 1460, Coppini entered into negotiations with the Yorkists (namely the Earl of Warwick, the Earl of March and the Earl of Salisbury) and returned from Bruges on 2 July 1460. Still proclaiming to seek negotiation, Coppini explicitly favoured the Yorkist cause at the Battle of Northampton.

With Henry VI now under control of the Yorkists, Coppini supposedly played a crucial role in arranging a new order in the kingdom, as he reported to Pius II. As he had been promised by the Yorkists, he could now fulfil his papal mission. After the Battle of Wakefield on 30 December 1460 however, the tides temporarily turned against York. In January 1461, Coppini sent fruitless letters of negotiation to Queen Margaret, then called for a crusade against the Lancastrians, promising absolution for those fighting alongside Warwick. Preparing for the worst, Coppini left London for the mainland on 10 February 1461. After the Second Battle of St Albans on 17 February 1461, he terminated his mission and fled to Bruges. He then travelled between Mechelen, Antwerp and Paris, still in close contact with the Yorkists.

== Trial and exile ==
In the aftermath of the Battle of Towton on 29 March 1461, both King Edward IV and Coppini's patron in Milan, Francesco Sforza, pleaded the pope to announce Coppini for the position of legate cardinal in England as reward for his services. Pius II however named the bishop of Arras as Coppini's successor to address concerns by the new French king Louis XI, who had sided with the Lancastrians in England. Coppini returned to England in the bishops entourage, but after French and Lancastrian complaints to the Pope, he finally returned to Rome in disgrace in November 1461.

In March 1462, Pius II partially yielded to political demands. A process against Francesco Coppini was opened, he was dismissed from his bishopric and sent to Castel Sant'Angelo. Charges were among others: simony, embezzlement and raising the banner of the church to incite civil war. Coppini confessed under pressure and on 2 March 1463, he was banished to the Abbey of St Paul Outside the Walls. He took the name of Ignatius on 21 March 1463. Still working on his rehabilitation under the new Pope Paul II, he died on 29 September 1464.
