= Giovanni Antonio Onorati =

Italian Roman Catholic prelate (died 1606)

Most Reverend Giovanni Antonio Onorati
- Bishop of Terni
- Church: Catholic Church
- Diocese: Diocese of Terni
- In office: 1591–1606
- Predecessor: Girolamo Petroni
- Successor: Ludovico Riva

Orders
- Consecration: 30 November 1591 by Girolamo Bernerio

Personal details
- Died: 1606 Terni, Italy

Giovanni Antonio Onorati (died 1606) was a Roman Catholic prelate who served as Bishop of Terni (1591–1606).

== Biography ==
On 20 November 1591, Giovanni Antonio Onorati was appointed during the papacy of Pope Innocent IX as Bishop of Terni. On 30 November 1591, he was consecrated bishop by Girolamo Bernerio, Bishop of Ascoli Piceno, with Galeazzo Moroni, Bishop of Macerata e Tolentino, and Ottavio Abbiosi, Bishop of Pistoia, serving as co-consecrators. He served as Bishop of Terni until his death in 1606.

== External links and additional sources ==
- Cheney, David M. "Diocese of Terni-Narni-Amelia". Catholic-Hierarchy.org. (for Chronology of Bishops) ^{[self-published]}
- Chow, Gabriel. "Diocese of Terni-Narni-Amelia (Italy)". GCatholic.org. (for Chronology of Bishops) ^{[self-published]}

Catholic Church titles
Preceded by Girolamo Petroni	Bishop of Terni; 1591–1606	Succeeded by Ludovico Riva
