= Roman Catholic Diocese of San Leone =

Former Latin Catholic diocese in Italy

The Diocese of San Leone (Latin: Dioecesis Sancti Leonis) was a Latin Church ecclesiastical jurisdiction or diocese of the Catholic Church located in the Italian town of San Leone in Calabria. In 1547, it was suppressed to the Archdiocese of Trani. It was restored as a titular see in 1966.

== History ==
- 1322: Established as Diocese of San Leone
- 1571 November 27: Suppressed to the Archdiocese of Santa Severina
- 1968: Restored as the Titular Episcopal See of San Leone

== Bishops of San Leone ==
Erected: 1322
Latin Name: Sancti Leonis
Metropolitan: Archdiocese of Santa Severina

...

- Antonius, O.Min. (Roman Obedience) 1402–1404

...

- Guberto de Nichesola (22 Apr 1439 Appointed – )

...

- Giuliano Dati (26 Feb 1518 – 1524 Died)
- Francesco Sperelli (19 Jan 1524 – 19 Jan 1526 Resigned)
- Anselmo Sperelli, O.F.M. (19 Jan 1526 – 1531 Resigned)
- Avanzio Cricche (18 Jan 1531 – 1535 Died)
- Ottaviano de Castello (8 Jan 1535 – 1542 Died)
- Tommaso Caselli, O.P. (11 Dec 1542 – 27 Oct 1544 Appointed, Bishop of Bertinoro)
- Marco Salvidi (14 Nov 1544 – 1555 Died)
- Giulio Pavesi, O.P. (23 Aug 1555 – 2 Oct 1555 Appointed, Bishop of Vieste)
- Giulio Rossi (23 Oct 1555 – Mar 1564 Died)
- Alvaro Magelanes (15 May 1565 – 27 Nov 1571 Died)

27 November 1571: Suppressed to the Archdiocese of Santa Severina

== Sources ==
- Eubel, Conradus, ed. (1913). Hierarchia catholica (in Latin). Vol. Tomus 1 (second ed.). Münster: Libreria Regensbergiana.
- Eubel, Conradus, ed. (1914). Hierarchia catholica (in Latin). Vol. Tomus 2 (second ed.). Münster: Libreria Regensbergiana.
- Gulik, Guilelmus (1923). Eubel, Conradus (ed.). Hierarchia catholica (in Latin). Vol. Tomus 3 (second ed.). Münster: Libreria Regensbergiana.
