= Giulio Rossi (bishop of San Leone) =

Most Reverend Giulio Rossi
- Bishop of San Leone
- Church: Catholic Church
- Diocese: Diocese of San Leone
- In office: 1555–1564
- Predecessor: Giulio Pavesi
- Successor: Alvaro Magelanes

Personal details
- Died: Mar 1564 San Leone, Italy

Giulio Rossi was a Roman Catholic prelate who served as Bishop of San Leone (1555–1564).

== Biography ==
On 23 Oct 1555, Giulio Rossi was appointed during the papacy of Pope Leo X as Bishop of San Leone. He served as Bishop of San Leone until his death in March 1564.

Catholic Church titles
Preceded by Giulio Pavesi	Bishop of San Leone; 1555–1564	Succeeded by Alvaro Magelanes
