= Franco Gualdrini =

Roman Catholic bishop

- Bishop of Terni-Narni-Amelia
- Church: Catholic Church
- Diocese: Diocese of Terni, Narni, e Amelia (until 1986); Diocese of Terni-Narni-Amelia
- In office: 14 September 1983 – 4 March 2000
- Predecessor: Santo Bartolomeo Quadri
- Successor: Vincenzo Paglia

Orders
- Ordination: 1 March 1947
- Consecration: 22 October 1983 by Sebastiano Baggio

Personal details
- Born: 26 June 1923 Faenza, Province of Ravenna, Kingdom of Italy
- Died: 22 March 2010 (aged 86)

Franco Gualdrini (26 June 1923 – 22 March 2010) was an Italian bishop in the Catholic Church.

A native of Faenza, he was appointed bishop of the Diocese of Terni-Narni-Amelia on 14 September 1983, a position he held until his retirement on 4 March 2000.

Gualdrini died in 2010, at the age of 86.
