= Vincenzo Paglia =

Italian Catholic archbishop

His Excellency The Most Reverend Vincenzo Paglia
- President Emeritus of the Pontifical Academy for Life
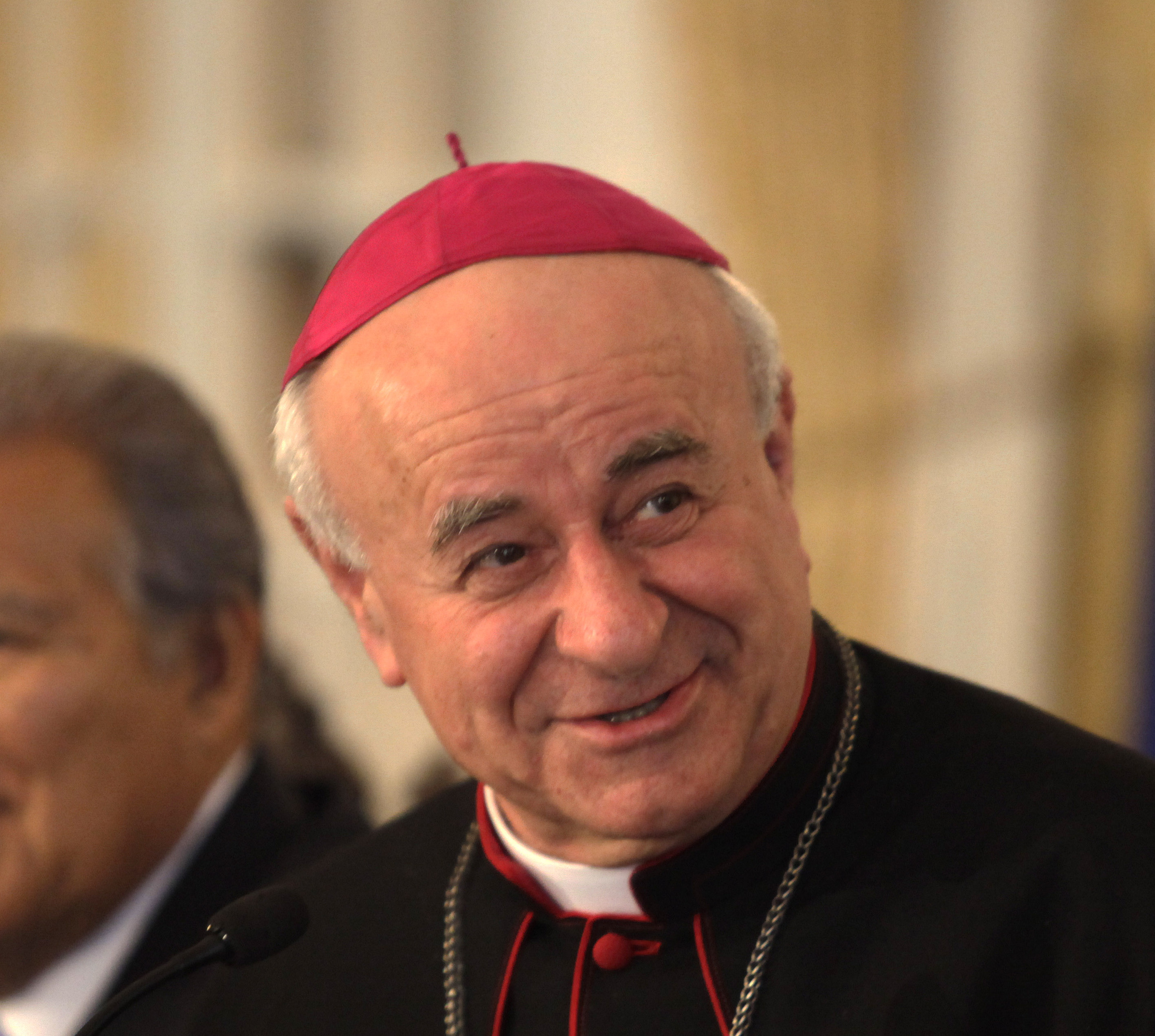
- Archbishop Paglia in 2015
- Church: Roman Catholic Church
- In office: 2016–2025
- Predecessor: Ignacio Carrasco de Paula; Agostino Vallini
- Successor: Renzo Pegoraro
- Previous posts: Bishop of Terni-Narni-Amelia (2000–2012); President of the Pontifical Council for the Family (2012–2016); Grand Chancellor of the John Paul II Pontifical Theological Institute for Marriage and Family Sciences (2016–2025)

Orders
- Ordination: 15 March 1970 by Angelo Dell'Acqua
- Consecration: 2 April 2000 by Camillo Ruini

Personal details
- Born: 21 April 1945 (age 81) Boville Ernica, Frosinone, Italy
- Motto: Gaudium et spes (Joy and hope)
- Coat of arms

Vincenzo Paglia (born 21 April 1945) (Note: Vatican sources give his birthdate as 20 April 1945.) is an Italian prelate of the Catholic Church. He was the president of the Pontifical Academy for Life from 2016 to 2025. He was grand chancellor of the John Paul II Pontifical Theological Institute for Marriage and Family Sciences from 2016 to 2025. Paglia was president of the Pontifical Council for the Family from 2012 to 2016 and Bishop of Terni-Narni-Amelia from 2000 to 2012. He was also a co-founder of the Community of Sant'Egidio in 1968. Paglia was the postulator for the cause of canonization of Óscar Romero and of Felix Varela.

== Early years ==
Paglia was born on 21 April 1945 in Boville Ernica, Frosinone, Italy. He was educated at the Pontifical Roman Minor and Major Seminary. He earned a licentiate in philosophy and a degree in theology from the Pontifical Lateran University, Rome. He also earned a master's degree in pedagogy from the University of Urbino, Italy. As a student in 1968, he was one of the co-founders of the Community of Sant'Egidio, an association of lay Catholics.

He was ordained a priest for the diocese of Rome on 15 March 1970 and served as a curate in Casal Palocco on the western outskirts of Rome from 1970 to 1973. Later, he was rector of the Church of Sant'Egidio in Trastevere. From 1981 to 2000, he was the pastor of Santa Maria in Trastevere as well as prefect of Rome's third prefecture. In 1982, he initiated Santa Maria's annual Christmas lunch (Pranzo di Natale) for the homeless and the poor, a project of the Community of Sant'Egidio held inside the church.

Along with other leaders of Sant'Egidio, he tried to promote peace in the Balkans following the dissolution of Yugoslavia. He was the first priest to enter Albania after the elections in March and April 1991. He successfully negotiated the re-opening of the seminary there and the restoration of the cathedral to Church control. He negotiated an agreement on government education between Albania and Serbia. He also mediated between Serbs and Kosovans. Slobodan Milošević once described him as "the pope's Kissinger". His efforts proved to be the groundwork on which to establish diplomatic relations between Albania and the Holy See.

On 4 March 2000, Pope John Paul II appointed him bishop of Terni-Narni-Amelia. From Cardinal Camillo Ruini, he received his episcopal consecration on 2 April in the Archbasilica of Saint John Lateran, and took possession of the diocese on 16 April. He later said that at the time of his appointment Terni was "among the most de-Christianized areas in Italy". He noted that local officials had created one-way streets to make it impossible to reach the cathedral by car and that by the time he left that was no longer the case.

In September 2002, John Paul named him President of the Catholic Biblical Federation. From 2004 to 2009, he was chairman of the Commission for Ecumenism and Dialogue of the Italian Episcopal Conference, and from 2009 until 2012 he was president of the Episcopal Conference of Umbria. As President of the Conference of Bishops of Umbria, he promoted the Solidarity Fund, an initiative that provides economic support for families particularly affected by the recent economic crisis. He was ecclesiastical advisor of the Community of Sant'Egidio.

In December 2010, the town of Narnia sold a castle to an Italian investment group whose head was also a financial officer of Paglia's diocese. A government investigation into the transaction found Paglia had not been involved. The judge handling the case wrote of "the total extraneousness of the present suspect [Paglia], who, on the contrary, appears to have always acted in the fulfillment of his pastoral mandate, with the sole meritorious objective of ensuring the city's reality a redemption in social and cultural terms". On 6 January 2011, he was named one of the first members, for a five-year renewable term, of the Pontifical Council for Promoting the New Evangelization.

Paglia has been responsible for inter-religious dialogue and has opposed a cooling of relations with Jewish leaders. He was also the postulator of the cause of beatification of Archbishop Oscar Romero, and wore a pectoral cross of Romero's that had been donated to him by Monsignor Ricardo Urioste, Romero's vicar general.

== Pontifical Council for the Family ==
On 26 June 2012, Pope Benedict XVI named him President of the Pontifical Council for the Family and raised him to the rank of archbishop. In February 2013, he noted in an interview that homosexual couples should be safe from unjust discrimination in countries where homosexual acts are illegal. He later said that he was not suggesting a change in church doctrine and that he was restating the official teaching of the Church. As the President of the Pontifical Council for the Family, he was responsible for the Church's triennial World Meeting of Families. His tenure as head of the Pontifical Council on the Family ended when that department's functions were taken over by the new Dicastery for the Laity, Family and Life on 1 September 2016.

== Pontifical Academy for Life ==
On 15 August 2016, Pope Francis named him president of the Pontifical Academy for Life and grand chancellor of the Pontifical John Paul II Institute for Studies on Marriage and Family, later renamed the John Paul II Pontifical Theological Institute for Marriage and Family Sciences. His appointment was part of Pope Francis' reform of the Roman Curia, timed to coincide with the erection of the Dicastery for the Laity, Family and Life. Francis gave the Institute greater autonomy by setting aside the Institute's statute that made the grand chancellor of the Pontifical Lateran University its grand chancellor as well, anticipating his revision of the Institute's statues released in September 2017. He authored a mission statement urging Paglia to "aid families to live their vocation in today's world" by promoting "the perspective of mercy", knowing that "even in theological study, the pastoral perspective and attention to the wounds of humanity never fail".

On 19 September 2016, Paglia presided and delivered the homily at the funeral of former Italian President Carlo Azeglio Ciampi. A longtime friend of Ciampi, he described bringing Pope Francis' blessing to him on his deathbed. Anticipating that the new statutes of the Academy established term limits for members who had previously been appointed for life, Paglia arranged for all memberships to expire at the end of 2016, allowing all members to serve thereafter on equal terms. Many of the old members were confirmed as members under the new rules. Paglia then defended the appointment of non-Catholics among the more than 50 members, calling them "lovers of life" even if not in perfect agreement with Catholic teaching. He said that creating consensus across divergent viewpoints gave the Academy credibility when promoting the Church's positions in society at large.

In 2023, speaking at the Perugia Journalism Festival on the ethical issues surrounding the end of life, Paglia said the Catholic Church "does not have a package of prêt-à-porter, a pre-packaged truth as if it were a distributor of truth pills". He said: "Personally, I would not practice assisted suicide, but I understand that legal mediation can constitute the greatest common good concretely possible in the conditions in which we find ourselves." Speaking of Humane Vitae in May 2023, he said that "the recognition of the unbreakable connection between married love and generation in Humanae Vitae does not mean that every marital act must necessarily bear fruit". He added: "We are facing epochal challenges. In the Sixties, the 'pill' was considered a total evil. Today, we face even greater dangers. All human life is at risk if we don't stop spiralling conflict, the arms race, if we don't stop destroying the environment".

In 2024, the Academy for Life issued a text on bioethical issues that reaffirmed the Church's opposition to euthanasia and assisted suicide, while considering the individual's right to refuse "aggressive treatment" in a new light, specifically recognizing that providing food and hydration to the dying or to someone in a vegetative state is properly viewed as an "aggressive treatment". In an introduction, Paglia wrote that the notion that food and hydration were essentials too ordinary to be withheld was "the result of cliches that have not been adequately scrutinized". Paglia reached the mandatory retirement age of 80 on 21 April 2025, the day Pope Francis died. On 19 May 2025 Pope Leo XIV named Cardinal Baldassare Reina to succeed him as grand chancellor of the Pontifical John Paul II Institute for Studies on Marriage and Family, and on 27 May named Renzo Pegoraro to succeed him as president of the Pontifical Academy for Life.

== Notes ==
Catholic Church titles
Preceded by Franco Gualdrini	Bishop of Terni-Narni-Amelia; 2000–2012	Succeeded by Giuseppe Piemontese
Preceded by Ennio Antonelli	President of the Pontifical Council for the Family; 2012–2016	Office abolished
Preceded by Ignacio Carrasco de Paula	President of the Pontifical Academy for Life; 15 August 2016 – 21 April 2025	Succeeded by Renzo Pegoraro
