= Sebastiano Gentili =

Italian Roman Catholic prelate

Most Reverend Sebastiano Gentili
- Bishop of Terni
- Church: Catholic Church
- Diocese: Diocese of Terni
- In office: 1656–1667
- Predecessor: Francesco Angelo Rapaccioli
- Successor: Pietro Lanfranconi
- Previous post: Bishop of Anagni (1642–1646)

Orders
- Consecration: 30 March 1642 by Alessandro Cesarini (iuniore)

Personal details
- Born: 1597 Foligno, Italy
- Died: 3 August 1667 (age 70) Terni, Italy

Sebastiano Gentili (1597 – 3 August 1667) was a Roman Catholic prelate who served as Bishop of Terni (1656–1667) and Bishop of Anagni (1642–1646).

He was born in Foligno, Italy in 1597. On 24 March 1642, he was appointed during the papacy of Pope Urban VIII as Bishop of Anagni. On 30 March 1642, he was consecrated bishop by Alessandro Cesarini (iuniore), Cardinal-Deacon of Sant'Eustachio, with Giovanni Battista Altieri, Bishop Emeritus of Camerino, and Deodato Scaglia, Bishop of Melfi e Rapolla, serving as co-consecrators. On 3 December 1646, he resigned as Bishop of Anagni.< On 29 May 1656, he was appointed during the papacy of Pope Alexander VII as Bishop of Terni. He served as Bishop of Terni until his death on 3 August 1667.

== External links and additional sources ==
- Cheney, David M. "Diocese of Anagni-Alatri". Catholic-Hierarchy.org. (for Chronology of Bishops) ^{[self-published]}
- Chow, Gabriel. "Diocese of Anagni-Alatri (Italy)". GCatholic.org. (for Chronology of Bishops)
- Cheney, David M. "Diocese of Terni-Narni-Amelia". Catholic-Hierarchy.org. (for Chronology of Bishops) ^{[self-published]}
- Chow, Gabriel. "Diocese of Terni-Narni-Amelia (Italy)". GCatholic.org. (for Chronology of Bishops)

Catholic Church titles
Preceded by Gian Gaspare Melis	Bishop of Anagni; 1642–1646	Succeeded by Pier Francesco Filonardi
Preceded by Francesco Angelo Rapaccioli	Bishop of Terni; 1656–1667	Succeeded by Pietro Lanfranconi
