= Thapsus =

Ancient Punic city

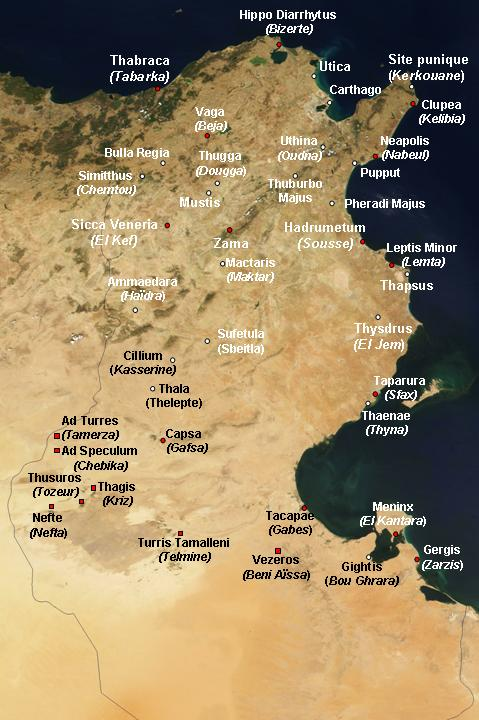

- Location within Tunisia
- 35°37′15″N 11°02′30″E
- Location: Tunisia
- Region: Monastir Governorate

Thapsus, also known as Tampsus and as Thapsus Minor to distinguish it from Thapsus in Sicily, was a Carthaginian and Roman port near present-day Bekalta, Tunisia.

== Geography ==
Thapsus was established on Ras ed-Dimas, an easily defended promontory on Tunisia's Mediterranean coast. It was near a salt lake. It was about 135 km (84 mi) from the island of Lampedusa and approximately 200 km (120 mi) southeast of Carthage.

== History ==
Thapsus was founded by the Phoenicians. It served as a waypoint on the trade routes between the Strait of Gibraltar and Phoenicia and as a market for the inland products of the area. Diodorus Siculus write that Agathocles of Syracuse conquered the city.

During his civil war, Julius Caesar defeated Metellus Scipio and the Numidian king Juba I at the costly 46 BC Battle of Thapsus. Caesar exacted a payment of 50,000 sesterces from the vanquished. The victory marked the end of opposition against him in Africa. Thapsus subsequently became a Roman colony in the province of Byzacena. The town's enormous mole may have been begun by the local emperors Gordian I, II, and III, but their reigns were too brief to have finished the work. The construction may have been abandoned partway through; Thapsus was never known as a world-class port and, after the collapse of Thysdrus in the 3rd century, all the area's maritime trade is known to have occurred through the harbors at Sullecthum, Thaenae, Leptis, and Gummi.

== Remains ==
Thapsus's surviving ruins include an amphitheatre and various mosaics. Thapsus was the site of one of the Roman Empire's greatest harbor moles, a huge concrete and stone breakwater extending almost a kilometer from shore; only the first hundred or so meters, however, remain above water. In 2022, the location of a possible theatre was detected by geophysics .

== Religion ==
In antiquity, Thapsus was a Christian bishopric. It was probably a suffragan but no metropolitan is known. The only known bishop was Vigilius, the author of several controversial works against the Arians and the Eutychians. He was one of the Catholic bishops whom king Hunneric of the Vandals summoned to his court in Carthage in 484 and then exiled.

The Catholic Church reëstablished it in 1914 as a titular see. It is a Latin title of the lowest rank, with one archiepiscopal exception.

- Valentín García y Barros (1914.12.10 – 1916.08.26)
- Arturo Celestino Alvarez (1919.12.18 – 1921.05.09)
- Andrew James Louis Brennan (1923.02.23 – 1926.05.28)
- Vincenzo Celli (1927.04.08 – 1951.10.17)
- Antonio Torasso, I.M.C. (1952.01.10 – 1960.10.22)
- Paul-Émile Charbonneau (1960.11.15 – 1963.05.21)
- Tomás Enrique Márquez Gómez (1963.06.25 – 1966.11.30)
- Alfredo Cifuentes Gómez (1967.03.10 – 1970.12.02), as titular Archbishop
- Ludwig Averkamp (1973.01.18 – 1985.11.07)
- Vladas Michelevičius (1986.11.13 – 2008.11.12)
- Ignacio Carrasco de Paula (2010.09.15 – ...), president-for-life of the Pontifical Academy
