= Carlo Bonafaccia =

Italian Roman Catholic prelate

Most Reverend Carlo Bonafaccia
- Church: Catholic Church
- Diocese: Diocese of Terni
- In office: 1675–1683
- Predecessor: Pietro Lanfranconi
- Successor: Sperello Sperelli

Orders
- Consecration: 9 February 1653 by Marcello Santacroce

Personal details
- Born: 24 March 1612 Rome, Italy
- Died: 18 October 1683 (age 71) Terni, Italy

Carlo Bonafaccia (24 March 1612 – 18 October 1683) was a Roman Catholic prelate who served as Bishop of Terni (1675–1683) and Bishop of Ortona a Mare e Campli (1653–1675).

== Biography ==
Carlo Bonafaccia was born in Rome, Italy on 24 March 1612. On 3 February 1653, he was appointed during the papacy of Pope Innocent X as Bishop of Ortona a Mare e Campli. On 9 February 1653, he was consecrated bishop by Marcello Santacroce, Bishop of Tivoli, with Giovanni Lucas Moncalvi, Bishop of Guardialfiera, and Riginaldo Lucarini, Bishop of Città della Pieve, serving as co-consecrators. On 27 May 1675, he was appointed during the papacy of Pope Clement X as Bishop of Terni. He served as Bishop of Terni until his death on 18 October 1683.

== External links and additional sources ==
- Cheney, David M. "Diocese of Terni-Narni-Amelia". Catholic-Hierarchy.org. (for Chronology of Bishops) ^{[self-published]}
- Chow, Gabriel. "Diocese of Terni-Narni-Amelia (Italy)". GCatholic.org. (for Chronology of Bishops) ^{[self-published]}

Catholic Church titles
Preceded by Alessandro Crescenzi (cardinal)	Bishop of Ortona a Mare e Campli; 1653–1675	Succeeded by Giovanni Vespoli-Casanatte
Preceded by Pietro Lanfranconi	Bishop of Terni; 1675–1683	Succeeded by Sperello Sperelli
