= Girolamo Petroni =

Italian Roman Catholic prelate

Most Reverend Girolamo Petroni
- Bishop of Terni
- Church: Catholic Church
- Diocese: Diocese of Terni
- In office: 1581–1591
- Predecessor: Bartolomeo Ferro
- Successor: Giovanni Antonio Onorati

Personal details
- Died: 1591 Terni, Italy

Girolamo Petroni (died 1591) was a Roman Catholic prelate who served as Bishop of Terni (1581–1591).

== Biography ==
On 16 January 1581, Girolamo Petroni was appointed by Pope Gregory XIII as Bishop of Terni. He served as Bishop of Terni until his death in 1591.

== External links and additional sources ==
- Cheney, David M. "Diocese of Terni-Narni-Amelia". Catholic-Hierarchy.org. (for Chronology of Bishops) ^{[self-published]}
- Chow, Gabriel. "Diocese of Terni-Narni-Amelia (Italy)". GCatholic.org. (for Chronology of Bishops) ^{[self-published]}

Catholic Church titles
Preceded by Bartolomeo Ferro	Bishop of Terni; 1581–1591	Succeeded by Giovanni Antonio Onorati
