= Luigi d'Apera =

Most Reverend Luigi d'Apera
- Bishop of Terni
- Church: Catholic Church
- Diocese: Diocese of Terni
- In office: 1509–1520
- Predecessor: Pietro Bodoni
- Successor: Pompeo Colonna

Personal details
- Died: 1520 Terni, Italy

Luigi d'Apera (died 1520) was a Roman Catholic prelate who served as Bishop of Terni (1509–1520).

== Biography ==
In September 1509, Luigi d'Apera was appointed by Pope Julius II as Bishop of Terni. He served as Bishop of Terni until his death in 1520.

== External links and additional sources ==
- Cheney, David M. "Diocese of Terni-Narni-Amelia". Catholic-Hierarchy.org. (for Chronology of Bishops) ^{[self-published]}
- Chow, Gabriel. "Diocese of Terni-Narni-Amelia (Italy)". GCatholic.org. (for Chronology of Bishops) ^{[self-published]}

Catholic Church titles
| Preceded by Pietro Bodoni | Bishop of Terni; 1509–1520 | Succeeded by Pompeo Colonna |
