= Francesco Angelo Rapaccioli =

Italian Catholic Cardinal

His Eminence Francesco Angelo Rappaccioli
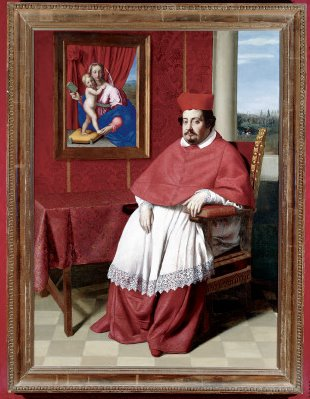
- Painting of Cardinal Rappaccioli by Giovanni Battista Salvi da Sassoferrato.
- Church: Catholic Church

Orders
- Consecration: 28 Oct 1646 by Marcantonio Franciotti

Personal details
- Born: 1608 Collescipoli, Italy
- Died: 15 May 1657 (age 49)

Francesco Angelo Rappaccioli (1608 – 15 May 1657) was an Italian Catholic Cardinal.

== Biography ==
Rappaccioli was born in 1608, the son of a modest family in Narni, Italy.

He entered the service of the church and became a referendary of the Tribunals of the Apostolic Signatura of Justice and of Grace then Regent of the Apostolic Chancery in 1634. In 1634 he became Cleric and Treasurer-General of the Apostolic Chamber. He was also appointed President of the archives and Commissary of the papal army during the Wars of Castro.

In July 1643 Rappaccioli was elevated to cardinal by Pope Urban VIII, was made papal legate to the Province of Viterbo and Cardinal-Priest of Santa Maria in Via Lata. Later that year.

When Pope Urban died the following year, Rapaccioli participated in the Papal conclave of 1644 which elected Pope Innocent X. He was made abbot of Saint-Athanase de Carbonne. In 1646 he was elected Bishop of Terni. On 28 Oct 1646, he was consecrated bishop by Marcantonio Franciotti, Cardinal-Priest of Santa Maria della Pace, with Alfonso Gonzaga, Titular Archbishop of Rhodus, and Girolamo Farnese, Titular Archbishop of Patrae, serving as co-consecrators.

In 1650 he was appointed Cardinal-Priest of Santa Cecilia in Trastevere while retaining administration of the diocese of Terni. He participated in the conclave of 1655 which elected Pope Alexander VII and became Camerlengo of the Sacred College of Cardinals between 1656 and 1657. In 1656 he resigned the government of his diocese.

Rappaccioli died on 15 May 1657 in his palace on Capitoline Hill, Rome.

== References and notes ==
Catholic Church titles
Preceded by Gil Carrillo de Albornoz	Cardinal-Priest of Santa Maria in Via; 1643–1650	Succeeded by Carlo Rossetti
Preceded by Ippolito Andreassi	Bishop of Terni; 1646–1656	Succeeded by Sebastiano Gentili
Preceded by Gaspare Mattei	Cardinal-Priest of Santa Cecilia; 1650–1657	Succeeded by Ottavio Acquaviva d'Aragona (iuniore)
