= Muzio Calini =

Italian Roman Catholic prelate

Most Reverend Muzio Calini
- Archbishop (Personal Title) of Terni
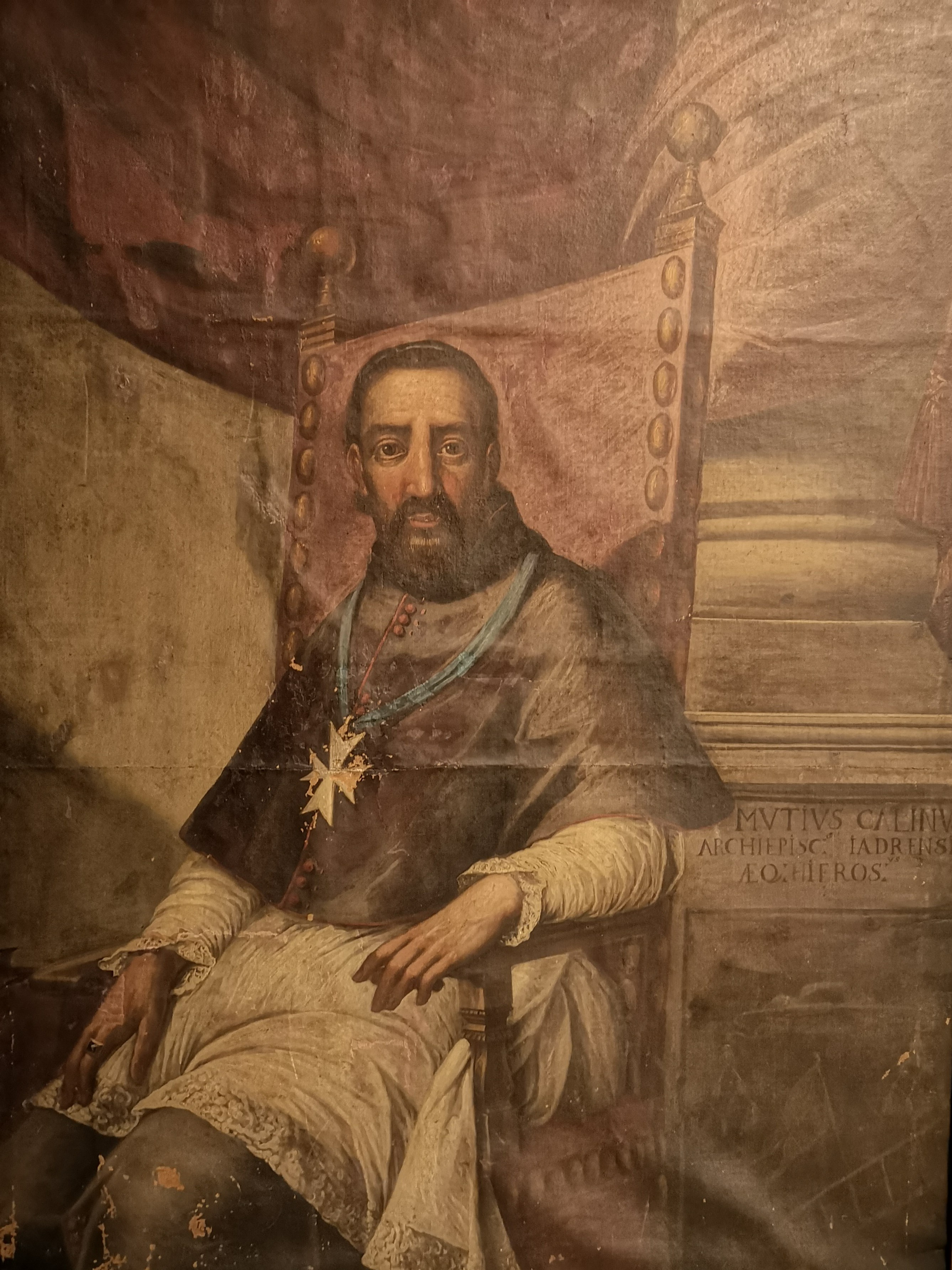
- Most Rev.Muzio Calini picture
- Church: Catholic Church
- Diocese: Diocese of Terni
- In office: 1566–1570
- Predecessor: Tommaso Scotti
- Successor: Bartolomeo Ferro
- Previous post: Archbishop of Zadar (1555-1566)

Personal details
- Born: 1525 Brescia, Italy
- Died: April 1570 (age 45) Terni, Italy

Muzio Calini (died April 1570) was a Roman Catholic prelate who served as Archbishop (Personal Title) of Terni (1566–1570) and Archbishop of Zadar (1555–1566).

== Biography ==
Muzio Calini was born in Brescia, Italy in 1525. On 17 July 1555, he was appointed by Pope Paul IV as Archbishop of Zadar. On 12 July 1566, he was appointed by Pope Pius V as Archbishop (Personal Title) of Terni. He served as Bishop of Terni until his death on In April 1570 in Terni, Italy.

== See also ==
- Catholic Church in Italy

== External links and additional sources ==
- Cheney, David M. "Archdiocese of Zadar (Zara)". Catholic-Hierarchy.org. (for Chronology of Bishops) ^{[self-published]}
- Chow, Gabriel. "Archdiocese of Zadar (Croatia)". GCatholic.org. (for Chronology of Bishops) ^{[self-published]}
- Cheney, David M. "Diocese of Terni-Narni-Amelia". Catholic-Hierarchy.org. (for Chronology of Bishops) ^{[self-published]}
- Chow, Gabriel. "Diocese of Terni-Narni-Amelia (Italy)". GCatholic.org. (for Chronology of Bishops) ^{[self-published]}

Catholic Church titles
Preceded by Luigi Cornaro	Archbishop of Zadar; 1555–1566	Succeeded by Andrea Minucci
Preceded by Tommaso Scotti	Archbishop (Personal Title) of Terni; 1566–1570	Succeeded by Bartolomeo Ferro
