= Sebastiano Valenti =

Roman Catholic prelate

Most Reverend Sebastiano Valenti
- Bishop of Terni
- Church: Catholic Church
- Diocese: Diocese of Terni
- In office: 1520–1553
- Predecessor: Pompeo Colonna
- Successor: Giovanni Giacomo Barba

Personal details
- Died: 1553 Terni, Italy

Sebastiano Valenti (died 1553) was a Roman Catholic prelate who served as Bishop of Terni (1520–1553).

== Biography ==
On 5 December 1520, Sebastiano Valenti was appointed by Pope Leo X as Bishop of Terni. He served as Bishop of Terni until his death in 1553.

== External links and additional sources ==
- Cheney, David M. "Diocese of Terni-Narni-Amelia". Catholic-Hierarchy.org. (for Chronology of Bishops) ^{[self-published]}
- Chow, Gabriel. "Diocese of Terni-Narni-Amelia (Italy)". GCatholic.org. (for Chronology of Bishops) ^{[self-published]}

Catholic Church titles
Preceded by Pompeo Colonna	Bishop of Terni; 1520–1553	Succeeded by Giovanni Giacomo Barba
