= Tommaso Scotti =

Italian Roman Catholic prelate

Most Reverend Tommaso Scotti
- Bishop of Terni
- Church: Catholic Church
- Diocese: Diocese of Terni
- In office: 1566
- Predecessor: Giovanni Giacomo Barba
- Successor: Muzio Calini

Personal details
- Died: 22 May 1566 Terni, Italy

Tommaso Scotti, O.P. (died 22 May 1566) was a Roman Catholic prelate who served as Bishop of Terni (1566).

== Biography ==
Tommaso Scotti was ordained a priest in the Order of Preachers. On 6 March 1566, he was appointed by Pope Pius V as Bishop of Terni. He served as Bishop of Terni until his death on 22 May 1566.

== External links and additional sources ==
- Cheney, David M. "Diocese of Terni-Narni-Amelia". Catholic-Hierarchy.org. (for Chronology of Bishops) ^{[self-published]}
- Chow, Gabriel. "Diocese of Terni-Narni-Amelia (Italy)". GCatholic.org. (for Chronology of Bishops) ^{[self-published]}

Catholic Church titles
Preceded by Giovanni Giacomo Barba	Bishop of Terni; 1566	Succeeded by Muzio Calini
