= Giulio Vitelli =

Roman Catholic prelate

Most Reverend Giulio Vitelli
- Bishop of Città di Castello
- Church: Catholic Church
- Diocese: Diocese of Città di Castello
- In office: 1499–1530
- Predecessor: Ventura Bufalini
- Successor: Antonio Maria Ciocchi del Monte

Giulio Vitelli was a Roman Catholic prelate who served as Bishop of Città di Castello (1499–1503).

== Biography ==
On 7 April 1499, Giulio Vitelli was appointed by Pope Alexander VI as Bishop of Città di Castello. He served as Bishop of Città di Castello until his resignation in 1503.

== External links and additional sources ==
- Cheney, David M. "Diocese of Città di Castello". Catholic-Hierarchy.org. (for Chronology of Bishops) ^{[self-published]}
- Chow, Gabriel. "Diocese of Città di Castello". GCatholic.org. (for Chronology of Bishops) ^{[self-published]}

Catholic Church titles
Preceded by Ventura Bufalini	Bishop of Città di Castello; 1499–1503	Succeeded by Antonio Maria Ciocchi del Monte
