= Girolamo Maccabei de Toscanella =

Roman Catholic prelate

Most Reverend Girolamo Maccabei de Toscanella
- Bishop of Castro del Lazio
- Church: Catholic Church
- In office: 1543–1568
- Predecessor: Luigi Magnasco di Santa Fiora
- Successor: Francesco Cittadini

Personal details
- Died: 1574 Castro del Lazio, Italy

Girolamo Maccabei de Toscanella (died 1574) was a Roman Catholic prelate who served as Bishop of Castro del Lazio (1543–1568).

== Biography ==
On 6 July 1543, Girolamo Maccabei de Toscanella was appointed during the papacy of Pope Paul III as Bishop of Castro del Lazio. He served as Bishop of Castro del Lazio until his resignation in 1568. He died in 1574.

== Episcopal succession ==
While bishop, he was the principal consecrator of:

- Girolamo Dandini, Bishop of Caserta (1545);
- Giovanni Giacomo Barba, Bishop of Teramo (1546); and
- Romolo Cesi, Bishop of Narni (1566);

and the principal co-consecrator of:

- Giovanni Battista Castagna, Archbishop of Rossano; and
- Egidio Valenti, Bishop of Nepi e Sutri.

Catholic Church titles
Preceded by Lodovico Magnasco di Santa Fiora	Bishop of Castro del Lazio; 1543–1568	Succeeded by Francesco Cittadini
