= Terni Cathedral =

Cathedral in Terni, Umbria, Italy

Coordinates: 42°33′37″N 12°38′37″E

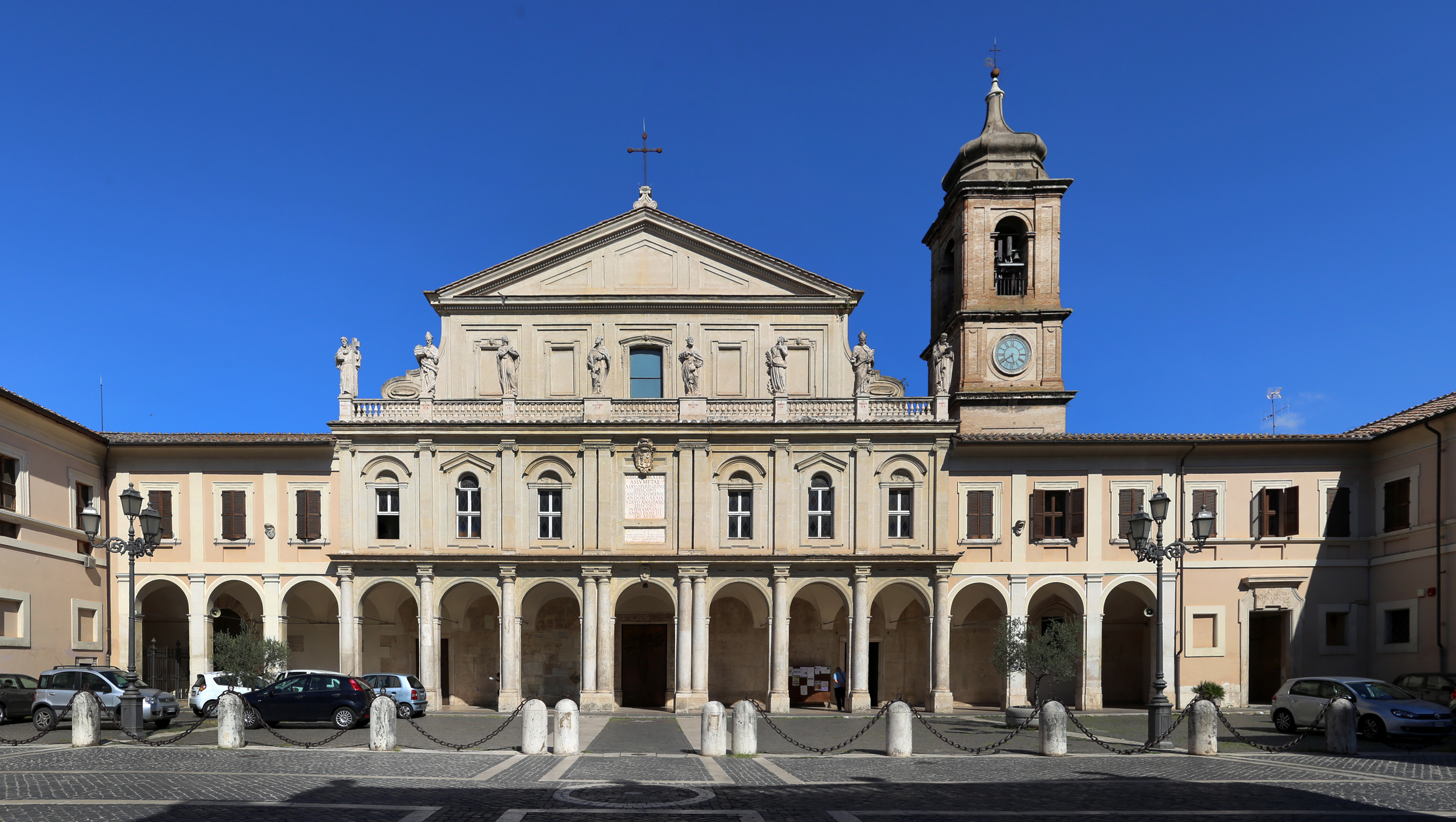
Front of Terni Cathedral

Terni Cathedral (Italian: Duomo di Terni, Cattedrale di Santa Maria Assunta) is a Roman Catholic cathedral in Terni, Umbria, Italy, and the seat of the bishop of Terni-Narni-Amelia. It is dedicated to the Assumption of the Virgin Mary.

== History ==
The present cathedral is the result of a long series of rebuildings and repairs over the centuries. The first cathedral of Terni was built, according to local tradition, over a pagan temple by the first bishop of Terni, Saint Peregrine, in the 2nd century. The tradition ignores that Christianity was an illegal cult until the 4th century; that the Church had no corporate existence in Roman law and could hold no land; and that the alleged cathedral replaced a temple of Jupiter, the principal god of the official Roman pantheon. Tradition states further that Saint Anastasius, bishop of Terni from 606 to 653, built another cathedral on the site in the 7th century.

Repair works between 1932 and 1937 (to plans by Marcello Piacentini) uncovered in the present crypt three apses and the remains of a rose window between two mullioned windows, each of two lights, from this earlier structure. In the 9th century a major reconstruction took place which turned the earlier structure into the crypt of a new cathedral; a further re-building took place in the 12th century. Little now remains of this Romanesque cathedral, because of modernisation works in the taste of the day which were carried out in the 16th and 17th centuries, which included the raising of the height of the central nave, the refacing of the tribune and the campanile, the construction of a baptistry and of the side chapels, and above all the integration of the church and the piazza on which it stands according to Baroque designs by Gian Lorenzo Bernini in the 17th century. As regards the side tower, its position was much discussed in 1500; the conclusion reached was to place it to the left of the apse, where it was rebuilt in 1743.

== Description ==
The west front presents a wide portico with a double colonnade; three doors open from the portico in Romanesque style, decorated with friezes. The upper part of the frontage is modern, containing a balustrade in travertine and statues of eight bishops of Terni, among them Saint Valentine of Terni, to plans by Marcello Piacentini.

The interior, on a Latin cross groundplan, has a central nave between two side aisles, divided by piers, with side chapels (including those of the baptistry and of the Blessed Sacrament), a transept and an apse.

The works of art include:

- Choir by Domenico Corsi (1559);
- Fresco of the west wall depicting the patron saints of the city with angels (17th century);
- Baptismal font with the sculpted heraldic symbol of the town (1585);
- Noli me tangere, oil on canvas attributed to Guido Reni;
- Agony in the Garden, oil on canvas attributed to Francesco Cincinnato, a follower of Guercino;
- Tabernacle by Carlo Murena containing relics of the blood of Christ;
- Organ of the 17th century;
- Crypt, with the tomb of Saint Anastasius, made by reusing a pagan altar and decorating it with Cosmatesque carvings (other carvings of the same sort are preserved in the sacristy).

== Sources and external links ==
- Bellaumbria: Duomo di Terni (in Italian)
- Terni municipal website (in Italian)
