= Giovanni Giacomo Barba =

Roman Catholic prelate

Most Reverend Giovanni Giacomo Barba
- Bishop of Terni
- Church: Catholic Church
- Diocese: Diocese of Terni
- In office: 1553–1565
- Predecessor: Sebastiano Valenti
- Successor: Tommaso Scotti
- Previous post: Bishop of Teramo (1546–1553)

Orders
- Consecration: 6 June 1546 by Girolamo Maccabei de Toscanella

Personal details
- Born: 1490 Naples, Italy
- Died: 1 October 1565 (age 75) Terni, Italy

Giovanni Giacomo Barba or Jean Jacques Barba (1490 – 1 October 1565) was a Roman Catholic prelate who served as Bishop of Terni (1553–1565) and Bishop of Teramo (1546–1553).

== Biography ==
Giovanni Giacomo Barba was born in Naples, Italy in 1490 and ordained a priest in the Order of Saint Augustine. On 26 May 1546, he was appointed during the papacy of Pope Paul III as Bishop of Teramo. On 6 June 1546, he was consecrated bishop by Girolamo Maccabei de Toscanella, Bishop of Castro del Lazio, with Cristoforo Spiriti, Bishop of Cesena, and Luigi Magnasco di Santa Fiora, Bishop of Assisi, serving as co-consecrators. On 3 July 1553, he was appointed during the papacy of Pope Julius III as Bishop of Terni. He served as Bishop of Terni until his death on 1 October 1565.

== Episcopal succession ==
Episcopal succession of Giovanni Giacomo Barba

While bishop, he was the principal consecrator of:

- Paolo de Cupis, Bishop of Montepeloso (1546);
- Filippo Roccabella, Bishop of Macerata (1546);
- Pierre de Affatatis, Bishop of Accia (1547);
- Teodoro Isidoro Clarius de Brescia, Bishop of Foligno (1547);
- Bartolomeo Albani, Bishop of Sessa Aurunca (1547);
- Filippo Angelo Seragli, Bishop of Modruš (1547);
- Nicolò Vernely, Bishop of Bagnoregio (1547);
- Michele della Torre, Bishop of Ceneda (1547);
- Bernardino Maffei, Bishop of Massa Marittima (1547);
- Rodrigo Vázquez, Auxiliary Bishop of Massa Marittima (1551);
- Antonio Bernardo de Mirandola, Bishop of Caserta (1552);
- Giovanni Andrea Candido, Bishop of Gerace (1552);
- James Beaton, Archbishop of Glasgow (1552);
- Giulio Giovio, Coadjutor Bishop of Nocera de' Pagani (1553);
- Giulio Canani, Bishop of Adria (1554);
- Antonio Agustín, Bishop of Alife (1557);
- Gianantonio Capizucchi, Bishop of Lodi (1557);
- Angelo Massarelli, Bishop of Telese o Cerreto Sannita (1557);
- Giovanni Antonio della Tolfa, Bishop of San Marco (1557);
- Odoardo Gualandi, Bishop of Cesena (1557); and
- Costantino Bonelli, Bishop of Città di Castello (1560).

and the principal co-consecrator of:

- Bartolomeo Guidiccioni, Bishop of Teramo (1546);
- Girolamo Seripando, Archbishop of Salerno (1554);
- Brandelisio Trotti, Bishop of Saint-Jean-de-Maurienne (1560);
- Flavio Orsini, Bishop of Muro Lucano (1561); and
- Annibale Saraceni, Bishop of Lecce (1561).

== See also ==
- Catholic Church in Italy

== External links and additional sources ==
- Cheney, David M. "Diocese of Teramo-Atri". Catholic-Hierarchy.org. (for Chronology of Bishops) ^{[self-published]}
- Chow, Gabriel. "Diocese of Teramo-Atri (Italy)". GCatholic.org. (for Chronology of Bishops) ^{[self-published]}
- Cheney, David M. "Diocese of Terni-Narni-Amelia". Catholic-Hierarchy.org. (for Chronology of Bishops) ^{[self-published]}
- Chow, Gabriel. "Diocese of Terni-Narni-Amelia (Italy)". GCatholic.org. (for Chronology of Bishops) ^{[self-published]}

Catholic Church titles
Preceded by Giacomo Savelli	Bishop of Teramo; 1546–1553	Succeeded by Giacomo Silverii-Piccolomini
Preceded by Sebastiano Valenti	Bishop of Terni; 1553–1565	Succeeded by Tommaso Scotti
