= Michel Schooyans =

Belgian Jesuit priest and professor (1930–2022)

Michel Schooyans (6 July 1930 in Braine-l'Alleud, Belgium – 3 May 2022) was a Jesuit and university professor in theology and political philosophy in Catholic universities in Brazil (Pontifical Catholic University of São Paulo) from 1959 to 1969 and Belgium (Université Catholique de Louvain) from 1965 to 1995.

Ordained as a priest in 1955, he completed a PhD in philosophy in 1958 and was sent to Brazil the same year by the COPAL, the Collège pour l'Amérique latine de Louvain, a Belgian institution created at the instigation of the Holy See to train Belgian missionary priests who would be sent to Latin America to counter Marxist and Protestant influences there.

In a 1998 text marking and commenting the fiftieth anniversary of the Universal Declaration of Human Rights, he wrote that "every time that, in the name of this new conception of human rights, "new individual rights" - right to homosexuality, to abortion, to euthanasia, etc. - are suggested, there is a step forward towards the civilian sacralisation of violence".

During the 2010 controversy over Archbishop Rino Fisichella's position towards the 2009 Brazilian girl abortion case, Schooyans played an active role in an anti-abortion Vatican lobby which asked for Fisichella's resignation from the presidency of the Pontifical Academy for Life, saying that he had fallen into the trap of "bogus compassion," in criticizing the public excommunication by the Brazilian bishops of the doctors who had decided to perform an abortion on a nine-year-old girl who had been raped and whose life was at risk.

He was a member of the Pontifical Academy of Social Sciences of the Vatican, of the Royal Institute of International Relations in Brussels, the Institute for Demographic Policy in Paris, the Population Research Institute in Washington.
