= Livio Melina =

Italian theologian and priest

Livio Melina (born August 18, 1952 in Adria, Italy) is a priest of the Catholic Church and an Italian theologian.

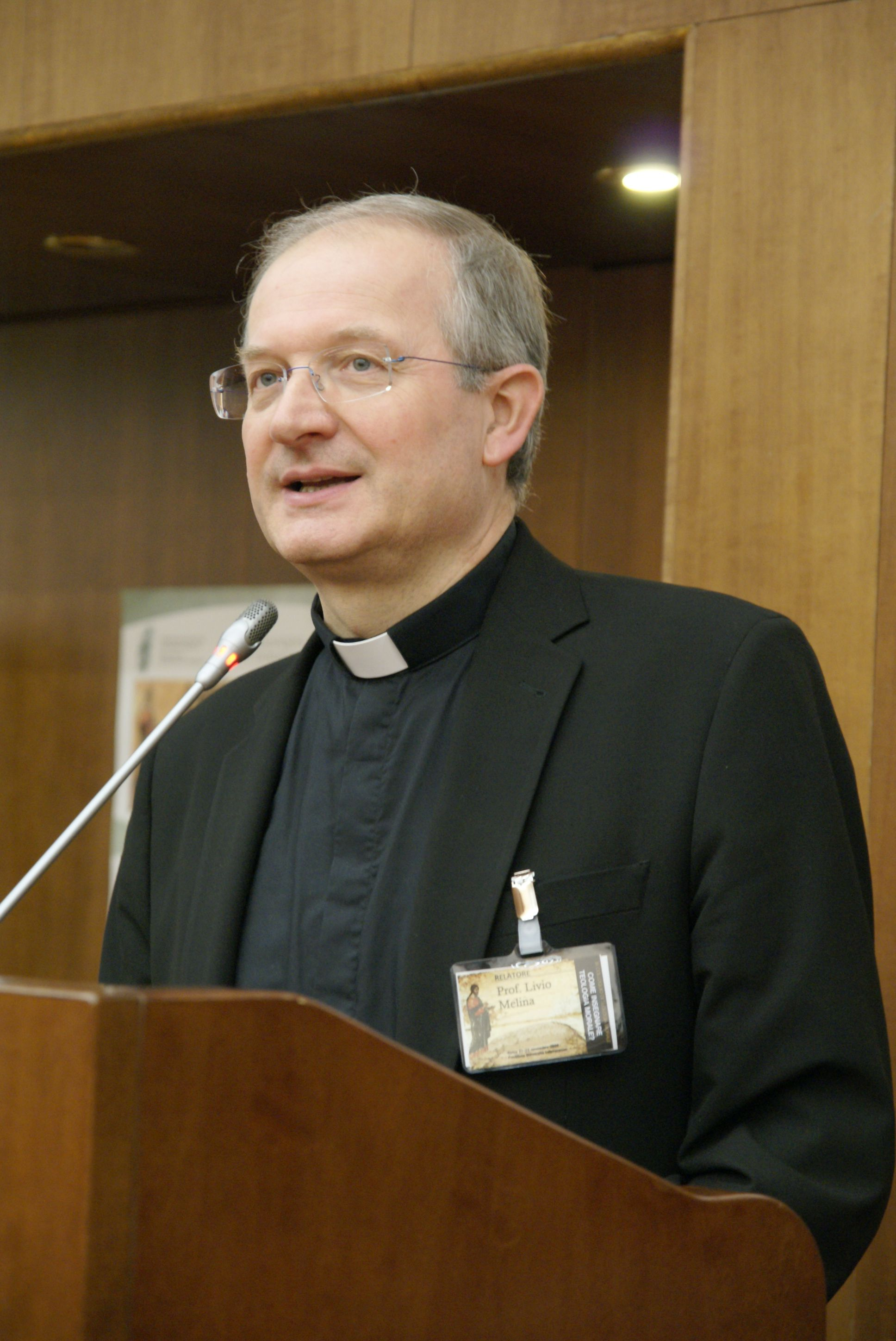
Livio Melina at a conference in 2008.

== Biography ==
Livio Melina was born in Adria in 1952. Since high school, he has been a member of the ecclesial Communion and Liberation movement and was one of its initiators in Veneto.

Melina completed a degree in philosophy at the University of Padua in 1975, and then entered the seminary of the diocese of Adria. He was ordained a priest on June 21, 1980.

In 1982 he obtained a Licentiate in Moral Theology (STL) from the Pontifical Gregorian University in Rome, and in October 1985 a Doctorate in Theology (STD) from the Pontifical Lateran University with the dissertation Ratio practica, scientia moralis e prudentia. Linee di riflessione sul Commento di San Tommaso all'Etica Nicomachea written under the direction of Professor Carlo Caffarra.

From October 1984 to October 1991 he worked as an assistant of studies at the Doctrinal Session of the Congregation for the Doctrine of the Faith, under the direction of then Card. Joseph Ratzinger.

In 1991 he became a tenured professor of Fundamental Moral Theology at the Pontifical John Paul II Institute for Studies on Marriage and Family. In 1997 he started The International Research Group on Moral Theology (Area Internazionale di Ricerca in Teologia Morale) and has been directing it since then. In 2002 he became Vice President of the Central Session of the Institute. In 2006 Benedict XVI nominated Melina as President of the Pontifical John Paul II Institute for Studies on Marriage and Family, where he was also a tenured Professor of moral theology, and in 2010 renewed the nomination, a position he held until 2016.

Melina was a Visiting Professor in Washington DC (United States of America) and Melbourne (Australia). He has given lectures and conferences in France, Spain, Great Britain, Switzerland, India, Mexico, Brazil, Argentina and Chile.

Since 2007 he has been an ordinary member of the Pontifical Academy of Theology. He was Scientific Director of the review Anthropotes, a member of the consultant committee of the international review Communio, and cooperates with other international reviews such as The Thomist, La scuola cattolica, Medicina e morale, La società, Il nuovo aeropago, Logos. He is also a corresponding member of the Académie d'Education et d'Etudes Sociales in Paris.

Melina, who received the honorary title of Monsignor from John Paul II, is considered, in Catholic circles, to be one of the greatest exponents of moral theology and bioethics.

On August 17, 2016, it was announced that Pope Francis had appointed Mgr Pierangelo Sequeri to replace Mgr Melina as President of the Pontifical John Paul II Institute for Studies on Marriage and Family.

Following the replacement of the Pontifical John Paul II Institute with the John Paul II Pontifical Theological Institute for Marriage and Family Sciences, by decree of the motu proprio Summa Familia Curae of September 8, 2017, the previously-existing Chair of Moral Theology was abolished and Mgr Melina, together with another previously-tenured professor, lost his position.

== Works ==
In addition to numerous articles, he has written, co-authored, and edited numerous books, including:

- La conoscenza morale. Linee di riflessione sul Commento di san Tommaso all'Etica Nicomachea, Città Nuova, Roma, 1987, ISBN 88-311-1340-2.
- Morale: tra crisi e rinnovamento. Gli assoluti morali, l'opzione fondamentale, la formazione della coscienza, Ares, Milano, 1993, ISBN 88-8155-105-5, translated in French, 1995, Spanish, 1996 and 1998.
- Corso di bioetica. Il Vangelo della vita, Piemme, Casale Monferrato, 1996, ISBN 88-384-2585-X.
- Amor conjugal y vocación a la santidad, Ediciones Universidad Católica de Chile, Santiago de Chile, 1997 ISBN 956-14-0428-1 (with Jean Lafitte), translated in French, 2001, Italian, 2006.
- Domanda sul bene e domanda su Dio, Lateran University Press - Mursia, Roma, 1999, ISBN 88-465-0056-3 (with José Noriega)
- Quale dimora per l'agire? Dimensioni ecclesiologiche della morale, Pontificia Università Lateranense, Roma, 2000, ISBN 88-465-0075-X (with Angelo Scola and P.Zanor).
- La plenitud del obrar cristiano: dinámica de la acción y perspectiva teológica de la moral, Palabra, Madrid, 2001 ISBN 978-84-8239-578-4 (with Juan José Pérez-Soba and José Noriega).
- Sharing in Christ's Virtues. For a Renewal of Moral Theology in Light of Veritatis Splendor, The Catholic University of America Press, Washington D.C., 2001 ISBN 0-8132-0989-7, translated in Spanish, 2005.
- Cristo e il dinamismo dell'agire, Linee di rinnovamento della teologia morale fondamentale, Lateran University Press - Mursia, Roma, 2001, ISBN 88-465-0097-0.
- Verità e libertà nella teologia morale, Pontificia Università Lateranense, Roma, 2001, ISBN 88-465-0205-1 (with J.Larrú).
- AA.VV., L'agire morale del cristiano, vol. XX di AMATECA - Manuali di Teologia Cattolica, Jaka Book, Milano, 2002, ISBN 88-16-40574-0, translated in Spanish, 2002.
- Il bene e la persona nell'agire, Lateran University Press, Roma, 2002, ISBN 88-465-0230-2 (with Juan José Pérez-Soba).
- La sequela Christi. Dimensione morale e spirituale dell'esperienza cristiana, Lateran University Press, Roma, 2003, ISBN 88-465-0451-8 (with O. Bonnewjin).
- Camminare nella Luce. Prospettive della teologia morale a partire da 'Veritatis splendor', Lateran University Press, Roma, 2004, ISBN 88-465-0487-9 (with José Noriega).
- Amore e giustizia. Limiti alla responsabilità?, Lateran University Press, Roma, 2005, ISBN 88-465-0501-8 (with D.Granada)
- Per una cultura della famiglia: il linguaggio dell'amore, Marcianum Press, Venezia, 2006, ISBN 88-89736-08-9
- Amore coniugale e vocazione alla santità, Effatà Editrice, Cantalupa (TO), 2006, ISBN 88-7402-063-5 (with J.Lafitte)
- AA.VV., Lo splendore della vita. Vangelo, scienza ed etica. Prospettive della bioetica a dieci anni da 'Evangelium Vitae', Libreria Editrice Vaticana, Città del Vaticano, 2006, ISBN 88-209-7884-9 (edited by Livio Melina, Elio Sgreccia and Stephan Kampowski)
- Una luz para el obrar. Experiencia moral, caridad y acción cristiana, Palabra, Madrid, 2006, ISBN 978-84-9840-059-5 (with Juan José Pérez-Soba e José Noriega).
- La via dell'amore. Riflessioni sull'Enciclica 'Deus caritas est' di Benedetto XVI, RAI-ERI, Roma, 2006, ISBN 9788839713926 (with Carl A. Anderson).
- AA.VV., Amare l'amore umano. L'eredità di Giovanni Paolo II sul matrimonio e la famiglia, Cantagalli, Siena, 2007, ISBN 88-8272-326-7 (edited by Livio Melina and Stanislaw Grygiel).
- Camminare nella luce dell'amore. I fondamenti della morale cristiana. Manuale di teologia cattolica, Cantagalli, Siena, 2008, ISBN 88-8272-348-8; Spanish edition, Palabra, Madrid, 2007, ISBN 978-84-9840-141-7 (with Juan José Pérez-Soba and José Noriega).
- Azione: epifania dell'amore. La morale cristiana oltre il moralismo e l'antimoralismo, Cantagalli, Siena, 2008, ISBN 88-8272-364-X.
- Imparare ad amare. Alla scuola di Giovanni Paolo II e di Benedetto XVI, Cantagalli, Siena, 2009, ISBN 978-88-8272-447-4.
- Liebe auf katholisch. Ein Handbuch für heute, Sankt Ulrich Verlag, Augsburg, 2009, ISBN 978-3-86744-103-2
- The Epiphany of Love: Toward a Theological Understanding of Christian Action, Ressourcement series, Wm. B. Eerdmans Publishing Company, Grand Rapids, 2010.
- Building a Culture of the Family: The Language of Love, Foreword by Scott Hahn, St. Pauls – Alba House, New York City, 201, ISBN 978-0-8189-1330-3.
- Learning to Love: in the School of John Paul II and Benedict XVI, Connorcourt, Ballan 2011.
- Come insegnare Teologia Morale? Prospettive di rinnovamento nelle recenti proposte di esposizione sistematica, Cantagalli, Siena 2009 (ed. by Livio Melina e Stephan Kampowski).
- Il criterio della natura e il futuro della famiglia, Cantagalli, Siena 2011(edited by Livio Melina).
- Una via sempre attuale: l’intuizione sorgiva del pontificato del Beato Giovanni Paolo II, Atti del Congresso “Verso Cristo”. A 30 anni da Redemptor hominis. Attualità di una via all’uomo, “Anthropotes”, XXVII (1/2011) Cantagalli, Siena 2011 (edited by Livio Melina e Carl Anderson).
- Famiglia e nuova evangelizzazione: la chiave dell’annuncio, Cantagalli, Siena 2012. (edited by Livio Melina e José Granados).
- La soggettività morale del corpo (VS 48), Cantagalli, Siena 2012 (edited by Livio Melina e Juan José Pérez-Soba).
- Amare nella differenza. Le forme della sessualità e il pensiero cattolico: studio interdisciplinare, Cantagalli- Libreria Editrice Vaticana, Siena - Città del Vaticano 2012 (edited by Livio Melina e Sergio Belardinelli); Spanish translation: BAC, Madrid 2013.
- La roccia e la casa. Socialità, bene comune e famiglia, San Paolo Edizioni, 2013.
- I primi anni del matrimonio. La sfida pastorale di un periodo bello e difficile (edited by L. Melina), Cantagalli, Siena 2014.
