= Philippe Bordeyne =

20th and 21st-century French Catholic priest and academic

Orders
- Ordination: 1988 by François Favreau

Personal details
- Born: 21 December 1959 (age 66)
- Occupation: President John Paul II Pontifical Theological Institute for Marriage and Family Sciences (2021-).; Rector of Institut Catholique de Paris (2011-2021).; Dean of Theologicum (2006-2011).; Professor of Moral Theology (2001-).
- Motto: “What do you have that you did not receive?” (1 Corinthians 4:7)

Philippe Bordeyne (born December 21, 1959) is a French priest, academic and theologian, and President of the John Paul II Pontifical Theological Institute for Marriage and Family Sciences. Bordeyne previously served as dean of Theologicum from 2006 to 2011 and rector of the Catholic Institute of Paris (Institut Catholique de Paris — ICP) from 2011 to 2021.

Bordeyne has been a Knight of the Legion of Honour since December 31, 2014.

== Life and career ==
Bordeyne was born in Paris in 1959.

- 1988 : Ordained priest in 1988 for the diocese of Nanterre (France)
- 1989 : obtained his master's degree and became teaching assistant at the Catholic Institute of Paris (ICP).
- 1989 to 2000 : Youth Minister in the Diocese of Nanterre
- 2001 : obtained his doctorate, jointly awarded by the ICP for Theology and by the University Paris-Sorbonne for the History of Religions and Anthropology of Religions, on the pastoral constitution Gaudium et Spes.

=== Theologian ===
- 2001 to 2021: Professor of Moral Theology at the ICP
- 2006 to 2009 : President of the Conference of Deans of the Faculties of Canon Law of France
- 2008 to 2011 : President of the International Conference of Catholic Theological Institutions
- 2009 to 2012 : Member of the Board of Directors of the International Federation of Catholic Universities
- 2011 to 2021: Rector of ICP
- 2013 to 2016 : President of the Union of Catholic Higher Education Institutions.
- 2011 : Pope Benedict XVI appointed him Chaplain of His Holiness.
- 2015 : Pope Francis appointed him expert for the Synod of Bishops on the Mission of the Family in the Church and in the world.
- 2018 : Expert for the Synod of Bishops on the Youth
- 2021 : President of the John Paul II Pontifical Theological Institute for Marriage and Family Sciences
- 2023 to 2024: Expert for the Synod of Bishops on Mission in a Synodal Churc
- 2025: Ordinary member of the Pontifical Academy of Theology

As a theologian, Bordeyne is a specialist in moral theology, liturgical studies and the theological hermeneutics of the Second Vatican Council and Practices of Synodality.

Bordeyne was also co-publisher and editor of the Bulletin of Moral Theology of Recherches de Science Religieuse (2003-2021).

Bordeyne is also the founder of the collection "Theology at the University".

== Bibliography ==
=== Monographs ===
- Portare la legge a compimento. Amoris Laetitia sulle situazioni matrimoniali fragili, coll. « Eis to bathos » 1, Roma, Libreria Editrice Vaticana, 2018.
- Divorcés remariés : ce qui change avec François, Paris, Salvator, 2017, 142 pages.
- Répondre à l'inquiétude de la famille humaine. L'actualité de « Gaudium et spes », coll. « Théologie », Montrouge, Bayard, 2014, 284 pages.
- Éthique du mariage : la vocation sociale de l’amour, coll. « Théologie à l’Université » 12, Paris, DDB, 2010, 286 pages.
- L’homme et son angoisse. La théologie morale de « Gaudium et spes », coll. « Cogitatio fidei » 240, Paris, Cerf, 2004, 415 pages.
- Croire les yeux ouverts. Quarante étapes pour découvrir la foi, Bayard Éditions/Centurion, Paris, 1997, 192 pages.
- Jeu d’Église. Enjeux et pratique d'une pédagogie, Paris, Bayard-Centurion, 1993, 119 pages.

=== Director of books ===
- Bordeyne Philippe, Pinçon Bertrand (éds.), Synode sur la vocation et la mission de la famille dans l'Église et le monde contemporain. 26 théologiens répondent, Montrouge, Bayard, 2015, 324 pages.
- Bordeyne Philippe, Léna Pierre, Oborne Michael (éds.), Éthique et changement climatique, Paris, Le Pommier, 2009.
- Bordeyne Philippe (éd.), Théologiens : Pourquoi ? Pour qui ?, Paris, Bayard, 2009, 190 pages.
- Bordeyne Philippe, Morrill Bruce T. (éds.), Sacraments, Revelation of the Humanity of God : Engaging the Fundamental Theology of Louis-Marie Chauvet, New York/Collegeville, MN, Pueblo/The Liturgical Press, 2008.
- Bordeyne Philippe, Thomasset Alain (éds.), Les communautés chrétiennes et la formation morale des sujets, coll. « Revue d’éthique et de théologie morale » 251, Paris, Cerf, 2008.
- Bordeyne Philippe, Morrill Bruce T. (éds.), Les sacrements, révélation de l’humanité de Dieu, coll. « Cogitatio fidei » 263, Paris, Cerf, 2008.
- Bordeyne Philippe, Boissieu Béatrice De, Maggiani Silvano (éds.), Marie, l’Église et la théologie : traité de mariologie, Paris, DDB, 2007.
- Bordeyne Philippe, Laurent Villemin (éds.), Vatican II et la théologie : perspectives pour le XXIe siècle, coll. « Cogitatio fidei » 254, Paris, Cerf, 2006.
- Bordeyne Philippe (éd.), Bible et morale, coll. « Lectio divina », Paris, Cerf, 2003.
