= Ernesto Vecchi =

Italian priest and theologian (1936–2022)

His Excellency Ernesto Vecchi
- Auxiliary Bishop Emeritus of Bologna
- Diocese: Bologna
- Appointed: 18 July 1998
- Term ended: 8 February 2011
- Other posts: Titular Bishop of Lemellefa (1998–2022); Apostolic Administrator of Terni-Narni-Amelia (2013–2014)

Orders
- Ordination: 25 July 1963 by Giacomo Lercaro
- Consecration: 13 September 1998 by Giacomo Biffi

Personal details
- Born: 4 January 1936 San Giovanni in Persiceto, Italy
- Died: 28 May 2022 (aged 86) Bologna, Italy

Ernesto Vecchi (4 January 1936 – 28 May 2022) was an Italian Roman Catholic auxiliary bishop.

Vecchi was born in Italy and was ordained to the priesthood for the Roman Catholic Archdiocese of Bologna, Italy, in 1963. He served as titular bishop of Lemellefe and as auxiliary bishop of the Bologna Archdiocese from 1998 until his retirement in 2011. Vecchi also served as the apostolic administrator of the Roman Catholic Diocese of Terni-Narni-Amelia, Italy, in 2013 and 2014.

Catholic Church titles
| Preceded by — | Auxiliary Bishop of Bologna; 1998–2011 | Succeeded by — |
| Preceded by Manual Pelino Domingues | Titular Bishop of Lemellefa; 1998–2022 | Succeeded by Sede vacante |
