= Andrea Minucci =

Roman Catholic prelate

The Most Reverend Andrea Minucci
- Archbishop of Zadar
- Church: Catholic Church
- Archdiocese: Archdiocese of Zadar
- In office: 1567–1572
- Predecessor: Muzio Calini
- Successor: Natale Venier

Orders
- Consecration: 15 February 1568 by Giulio Antonio Santorio

Personal details
- Died: 1572 Zadar, Croatia

Andrea Minucci (died 1572) was a Roman Catholic prelate who served as Archbishop of Zadar (1567–1572).

On 5 December 1567, Minucci was appointed during the papacy of Pope Pius V as Archbishop of Zadar. On 15 February 1568, he was consecrated bishop by Giulio Antonio Santorio, Archbishop of Santa Severina, with Girolamo Savorgnano, Bishop of Šibenik, and Galeazzo Gegald, Bishop Emeritus of Bagnoregio, serving as co-consecrators. He served as Archbishop of Zadar until his death in 1572.

== External links and additional sources ==
- Cheney, David M. "Archdiocese of Zadar (Zara)". Catholic-Hierarchy.org. (for Chronology of Bishops) ^{[self-published]}
- Chow, Gabriel. "Archdiocese of Zadar (Croatia)". GCatholic.org. (for Chronology of Bishops) ^{[self-published]}

Catholic Church titles
Preceded by Muzio Calini	Archbishop of Zadar; 1567–1572	Succeeded by Natale Venier
