= Vladas Michelevičius =

Lithuanian bishop

Vladislovas Michelevičius (8 June 1924 – 12 November 2008) was a Lithuanian bishop for the Catholic Church.

Born in 1924 he was ordained as a priest on 31 October 1948. On 13 November 1986 he was appointed as the Auxiliary Bishop of Kaunas, Titular Bishop of Thapsus, and Auxiliary Bishop of Vilkaviškis. Michelevičius resigned as Bishop of Vilkaviškis on 10 March 1989. He retired in 1999 and died on 12 November 2008.
