= Ippolito Andreassi =

Italian Roman Catholic prelate

Most Reverend Ippolito Andreassi
- Bishop of Terni
- Church: Catholic Church
- Diocese: Diocese of Terni
- In office: 1639–1646
- Predecessor: Cosimo Mannucci
- Successor: Francesco Angelo Rapaccioli

Orders
- Consecration: 27 April 1639 by Alessandro Cesarini (iuniore)

Personal details
- Born: 1581 Mantua, Italy
- Died: October 1646 (age 65) Terni, Italy

Ippolito Andreassi, O.S.B. (1581–1646) was a Roman Catholic prelate who served as Bishop of Terni (1639–1646).

== Biography ==
Ippolito Andreassi was born in Mantua, Italy in 1581 and ordained a priest in the Order of Saint Benedict. On 11 April 1639, he was appointed during the papacy of Pope Urban VIII as Bishop of Terni. On 27 April 1639, he was consecrated bishop by Alessandro Cesarini (iuniore), Cardinal-Deacon of Sant'Eustachio, with Tommaso Carafa, Bishop Emeritus of Vulturara e Montecorvino, and Lorenzo della Robbia, Bishop of Fiesole, serving as co-consecrators. He served as Bishop of Terni until his death in October 1646.

== External links and additional sources ==
- Cheney, David M. "Diocese of Terni-Narni-Amelia". Catholic-Hierarchy.org. (for Chronology of Bishops) ^{[self-published]}
- Chow, Gabriel. "Diocese of Terni-Narni-Amelia (Italy)". GCatholic.org. (for Chronology of Bishops) ^{[self-published]}

Catholic Church titles
Preceded by Cosimo Mannucci	Bishop of Terni; 1639–1646	Succeeded by Francesco Angelo Rapaccioli
