= Anselmo Sperelli =

Most Reverend Anselmo Sperelli
- Bishop of San Leone
- Church: Catholic Church
- Diocese: Diocese of San Leone
- In office: 1526–1531
- Predecessor: Francesco Sperelli
- Successor: Avanzio Cricche

Anselmo Sperelli was a Roman Catholic prelate who served as Bishop of San Leone (1526–1531).

== Biography ==
Anselmo Sperelli was ordained a priest in the Order of Friars Minor. On 19 Jan 1526, he was appointed during the papacy of Pope Clement VII as Bishop of San Leone. He served as Bishop of San Leone until his resignation in 1531.

Catholic Church titles
Preceded by Francesco Sperelli	Bishop of San Leone; 1526–1531	Succeeded by Avanzio Cricche
