= Diocese of Terni-Narni-Amelia =

Latin Catholic diocese in Italy

Coordinates: 42°34′N 12°39′E

Diocese of Terni-Narni-Amelia Dioecesis Interamnensis-Narniensis-Amerina

Catholic
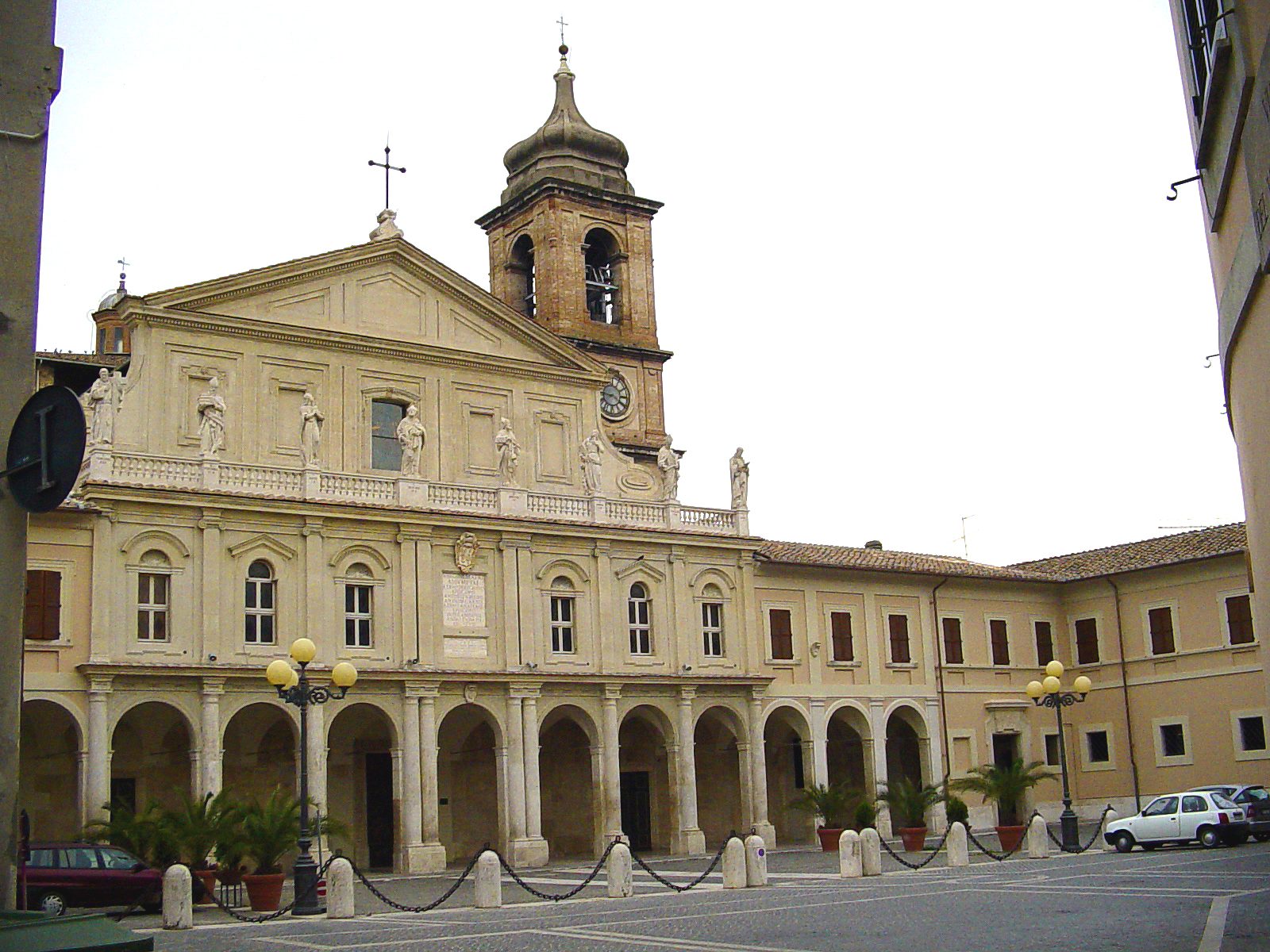
- Terni Cathedral

Location
- Country: Italy
- Ecclesiastical province: Exempt. Immediately subject to the Holy See

Statistics
- Area: 871 km^{2} (336 sq mi)
- Population: Total; Catholics: (as of 2023); 161,000 (est.) ▲; 150,000 (est.) ▼
- Parishes: 82

Information
- Denomination: Catholic Church
- Sui iuris church: Latin Church
- Rite: Roman Rite
- Established: 2nd century
- Cathedral: Cattedrale di S. Maria Assunta (Terni)
- Co-cathedral: Concattedrale di S. Giovenale (Narni); Concattedrale di S. Firmina (Amelia)
- Secular priests: 71 (diocesan) ▼50 (Religious Orders) ▲23 Permanent Deacons

Current leadership
- Pope: Leo XIV
- Bishop: Alfonso Raimo
- Bishops emeritus: Giuseppe Piemontese; Vincenzo Paglia

Map
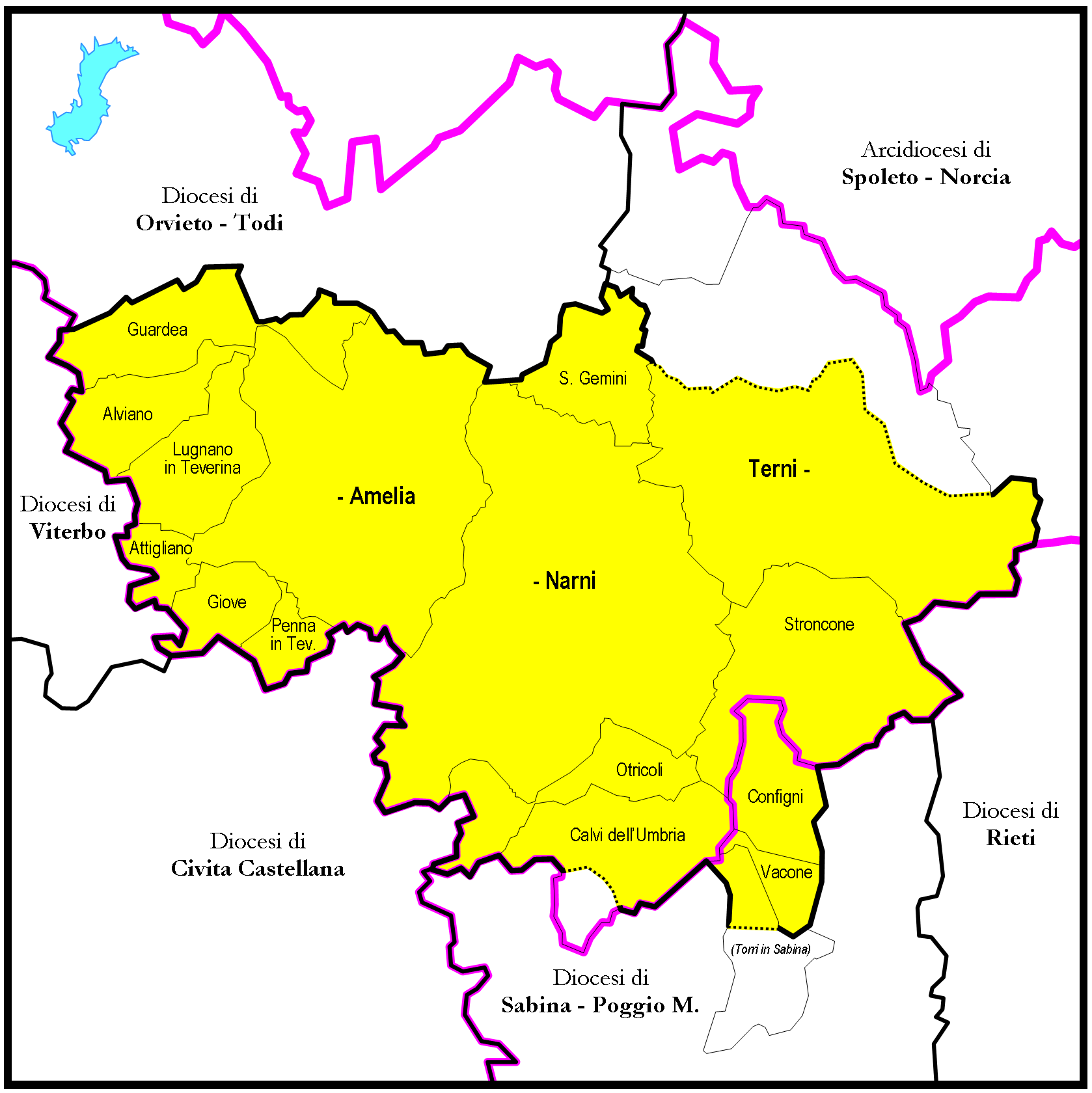

Website
- www.diocesi.terni.it

The Diocese of Terni-Narni-Amelia (Latin: Dioecesis Interamnensis-Narniensis-Amerina) is a Latin Church ecclesiastical territory or diocese of the Catholic Church in Umbria, central Italy. It was created in 1983, when the Diocese of Amelia was united with the Diocese of Terni and Narni. The Diocese of Terni and Narni had been created in 1907, when the Diocese of Narni was united with the Diocese of Terni, aeque personaliter. The diocese is immediately subject to the Holy See, not part of any ecclesiastical province.

== History ==
Terni is the ancient Interamna Nahars of the Umbrians, and the cathedral, and other churches, are built on the sites of pagan temples. A list of saintly bishops of Terni, wth their feast days, is inscribed on a plaque on a wall in the cathedral. It purports to indicate that Saint Britius, the archbishop of Spoleto and disciple of Saint Peter the Apostle, first preached the Christian message in Terni in the year 97, and that the first bishop of Terni, in 142, was the martyr Saint Peregrinus; however, Spoleto did not become an archdiocese until 1821. Saint Valentinus has a basilica outside the city. There were other martyrs from this city, among them saints Proculus, Ephebus, Apollonius, and the holy virgin Agape.

In the 590s, Pope Gregory I ordered the bishop of Narni to carry out an official visitation of the Church of Terni. The bishop found that Terni had an insufficient numer of Christians and of clergy to justify its having a bishop. Pope Gregory therefore, in a letter of November 598, entrusted the diocese of Terni to the bishop of Narni.

After the Lombard invasion, the city and territory of Terni belonged to the Duchy of Spoleto. It was at Terni that Pope Zacharias entered into the agreement with King Luitprand for the restitution of the cities of Bieda, Orte, Bomarzo, and Amelia to the Duchy of Rome. with Spoleto, Terni came into the Pontifical States in 774.

In May 856, Pope Benedict III delineated the boundaries of the city and of the diocese of Terni.

In 1159, Frederick Barbarossa granted the city and territory of Terni, with its regalia and other privileges, to Cardinal Ottaviano Monticelli and his brothers, making them counts. Cardinal Ottaviano had long been a supporter of the emperors, and, on 7 September 1159, he elected himself Antipope Victor IV in opposition to Pope Alexander III.

=== Restoration of the diocese ===
After the eighth century, Terni was without a bishop until 1218. During that time enmity had grown up between Terni, Amerina, and Todi, on the one hand; and Narni, Spoleto, and Sangemignano on the other. Pope Honorius III, on 7 February 1218, ordered hostilities of Narni and Spoleto against Terni to cease. On 13 January 1218 (1217 in the reckoning then in use), at the request of the Prior and the clergy of Santa Maria in Interamna (Terni), Pope Honorius III restored the diocese of Terni, which had belonged to the diocese of Spoleto for centuries. In his letter to the Prior and canons of S. Maria in Terni, Pope Honorius notes clearly that it was the poverty of the diocese of Terni which caused a suspension of the appointment of bishops. The diocese was to continue to be directly subject to the Papacy. On 18 July 1218, Narni was ordered to return the parish church of S. Valentino and its annexes to Bishop Rainerius of Terni.

=== Chapter and cathedral ===
The cathedral was extensively worked on in the 7th, 9th, 13th, 16th and 17th centuries.

The cathedral was served and administered by an ecclesiastical body called the Chapter, which consisted of one dignity (the Provost) and fourteen canons. Two of the canons are designated Theologus and Penitentiarius. The cathedral was also a parish church, and a parochial vicar was appointed to care for the parishoners. There were nine other parishes in the city of c. 5,000 persons, and six parishes elsewhere in the small diocese.

The diocese had a seminary, next to the episcopal palace, with facilities for thirty students.

=== Union with Narni aeque personaliter ===
On 11 December 1905, Francesco Moretti was appointed bishop of Narni, with the administratorship of the diocese of Terni, by Pope Pius X. On 12 April 1907, he was also named bishop of Terni.

Bishop Moretti's successor as Bishop of Terni e Narni on 13 June 1921 was Cesare Boccoleri. He was appointed bishop of the two cathedral churches of Terni and of Narni, making it clear that each of the two dioceses continued to have a separate existence and that their union was aeque personaliter, two dioceses having the same bishop. The diocese of Narni was not suppressed.

=== Diocesan reorganization ===
On 13 September 1983, Franco Gualdrini, who had been Rector of the Collegium Capranicum in Rome, was appointed bishop of Terni, Narni and Amelia, aeque principaliter. The diocese of Terni (and Narni and Amelia) continued to exist intact, though its bishop was also the bishop of another diocese.

The Second Vatican Council (1962–1965), in order to ensure that all Catholics received proper spiritual attention, decreed the reorganization of the diocesan structure of Italy and the consolidation of small and struggling dioceses. It also recommended the abolition of anomalous units such as exempt territorial prelatures.

In terms of civil jurisdictions, the city of Terni had become the capital of the Province of Terni, a factor which had to be taken into consideration in the reorganization of Italian dioceses.

On 18 February 1984, the Vatican and the Italian State signed a new and revised concordat. Based on the revisions, a set of Normae was issued on 15 November 1984, which was accompanied in the next year, on 3 June 1985, by enabling legislation. According to the agreement, the practice of having one bishop govern two separate dioceses at the same time, aeque personaliter, as was the case with Terni, Narni and Amelia, was to be abolished. Instead, the Vatican continued consultations which had begun under Pope John XXIII for the merging of small dioceses, especially those with personnel and financial problems, into one combined diocese.

On 27 September 1986, Pope John Paul II approved a decree, which was published by the Congregation of Bishops on 30 September 1986. The dioceses of Terni, Narni, and Ameria were united into one single diocese. Its seat was fixed at Terni, where its cathedral remained the cathedral of the united diocese. The former cathedrals at Narni and Ameria were given the honorary rank of co-cathedral. The name of the diocese was to be «Dioecesis Interamnensis-Narniensis-Amerina».

Among its bishops was Francesco Coppini (1458–1462), papal legate to England during the Wars of the Roses

=== Saints ===
In the time of Totila (541–552), Proculus of Terni, who is claimed as a bishop of Terni, was killed at Bologna; and Domnina of Terni and ten virgins, were put to death at Terni itself. Other indications put the martyrdom of the women in the 4th century, and in the Near East. Among the saints associated with Terni is Lucia Brocadelli (1476–1544), spiritual adviser to the Duke of Ferrara, Ercole I d'Este, 1499–1505, and a notable stigmatic.

== Bishops ==
=== Diocese of Terni ===
Latin Name: Interamnensis

==== To 1200 ====
[ Peregrinus (mid II cent.) ]
[ Anthimus ]

- Valentinus (d. 273)

[ Aelonius (436) ]

- Praetextatus (c. 465)

[ Anthemius (468) ]

- Constantinus (487).

[ Petrus ]

- Felix (c. 501–502)

[ Volusianus (520) ]
[ Valentinus (526) ]
[ Syrus (555) ]
[ Proculus (VI ?) ]

- Constantius (598 – after 601), Administrator

...

- Constantinus (c. 730–742)
- Spes (742–760?)

==== 1200 to 1500 ====
...

- Rainerius (1217–1253)
- Philippus (1253–1276?)
- Petrus
- Thomas, O.E.S.A. (1286– ? )
- Peregrinus (1296–1299?)
- Maffaeus (1299–1314)
- Andreas (1316–1319)
- Aegidius de Montefalco (1319–1323)
- Thomas (1323–1359)
- Matthaeus
- Bartholomaeus (c. 1380–1383), Roman Obedience
- Augustinus de S. Gemino, O.E.S.A. (1383–1391 ? ), Avignon Obedience
- Ludovico Mazzancoli (1406–1458), Roman Obedience
- Francesco Coppini (19 May 1459 – 1463)
- Ludovico Antoniis (4 Apr 1463 – 7 Feb 1472)
- Francesco Maria Scelloni, O.F.M. (1472)
- Tommaso Vincenzi (31 Aug 1472 – 29 May 1475 Appointed, Bishop of Pesaro)
- Barnaba Mersoni (29 May 1475 – 1481 Died)
- Giovanni Romano (1481–1485 Died)
- Francesco Maria Scelloni (1491–1494)
- Giovanni di Fonsalida (1 Oct 1494 – 1498 Died)
- Francisco Lloris y de Borja (19 Mar 1498 – 17 Apr 1499 Resigned)
- Ventura Bufalini (17 Apr 1499 – 15 Aug 1504 Died)

==== 1500 to 1907 ====
- Francisco Lloris y de Borja (4 Dec 1504 – 22 Jul 1506)
- Pietro Bodoni (29 Jul 1506 – 1509)
- Luigi d'Apera (7 Sep 1509 – 1520)
- Pompeo Colonna (14 May 1520 – 5 Dec 1520 Resigned)
- Sebastiano Valenti (5 Dec 1520 – 1553)
- Giovanni Giacomo Barba (3 Jul 1553 – 1 Oct 1565 Died)
- Tommaso Scotti (6 Mar–22 May 1566)
- Muzio Calini (12 Jul 1566 – Apr 1570)
- Bartolomeo Ferro (10 May 1570 – Jan 1581)
- Girolamo Petroni (16 Jan 1581 – 1591)
- Giovanni Antonio Onorati (20 Nov 1591 – 1606)
- Ludovico Riva (Ripa) (1606 – 8 Sep 1613)
- Clemente Gera (1613 – 1625)
- Cosimo Mannucci (1625 – 1634)

Sede vacante (1634–1639)

Francesco Vitelli, Apostolic Administrator

- Ippolito Andreassi, O.S.B. (11 Apr 1639 – Oct 1646)
- Francesco Angelo Rapaccioli (1646 – 1656 Resigned)
- Sebastiano Gentili (1656 – 1667 Resigned)
- Pietro Lanfranconi, O.E.S.A. (3 Aug 1667 – 6 Mar 1674)
- Carlo Bonafaccia (1675 – 1683)
- Sperello Sperelli (10 Jan 1684 – 14 Dec 1698 Resigned)
- Cesare Sperelli (19 Dec 1698 – 11 Dec 1720 Resigned)
- Teodoro Pongelli (Pungelli) (20 Jan 1721 – 3 May 1748 Resigned)
- Cosimo Pierbenedetto Maculani (6 May 1748 – 6 Oct 1767)
- Agostino Felice de' Rossi (25 Jan 1768 – 24 Sep 1788)
- Carlo Benigni (27 Jun 1796 – 12 Apr 1822)
- Domenico Armellini (1822 – 1828)
- Niccola Mazzoni (21 May 1829 – 11 Nov 1842)
- Vincenzo Tizzani (3 Apr 1843 – 14 Nov 1848 Resigned)
- Nicola Abrate (1848 – 1849)
- Antonio Magrini (11 Dec 1848 – 18 Mar 1852 Appointed, Bishop of Forli)
- Giuseppe Maria Severa (12 Sep 1853 – 4 Aug 1870)
- Antonio Belli (27 Oct 1871 – 2 Sep 1897 Retired)
- Francesco Bacchini (5 Mar 1898 – 11 Dec 1905 Resigned)

Sede vacante (1905–1907)

=== Diocese of Terni e Narni ===
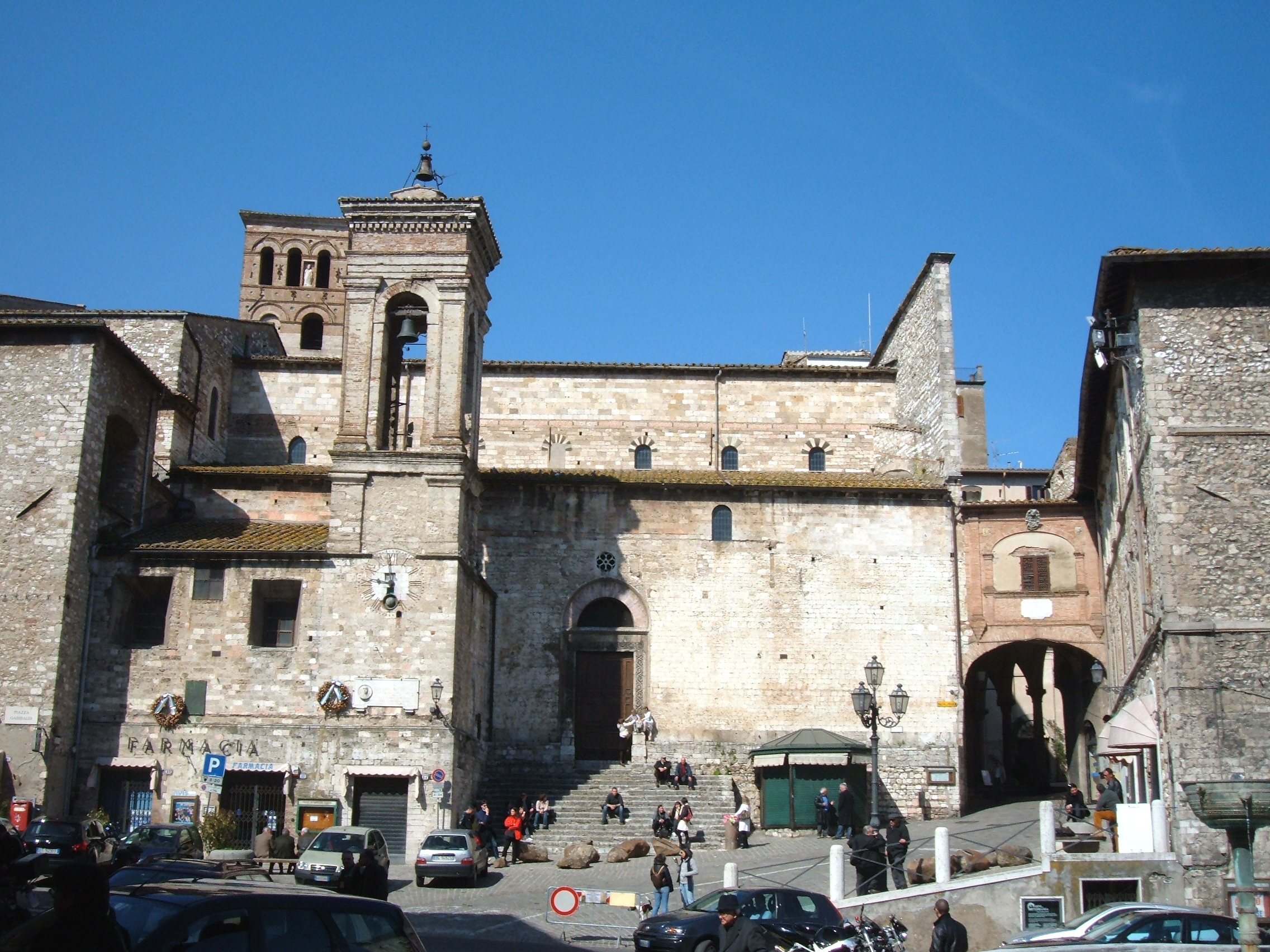
Co-cathedral in Narni

Latin Name: Interamnensis et Narniensis
United: 12 April 1907 with the Diocese of Narni, aeque personaliter
Immediately Subject to the Holy See

- Francesco Moretti (12 Apr 1907 – 7 Mar 1921 Resigned)
- Cesare Boccoleri (1921 – 1940)
- Felice Bonomini (1940 – 1947)
- Giovanni Battista Dal Prà (1948 – 10 Feb 1973 Resigned)
- Santo Bartolomeo Quadri (1973 – 1983)

=== Diocese of Terni, Narni, e Amelia ===
Latin Name: Interamnensis, Narniensis et Amerinus
United: 13 September 1983 with the Diocese of Amelia

- Franco Gualdrini (1983 – 2000 Retired)

=== Diocese of Terni-Narni-Amelia ===
Latin Name: Interamnensis-Narniensis-Amerinus
Name Changed: 30 September 1986

- Vincenzo Paglia (2000 – 2012)
  - Ernesto Vecchi, Apostolic Administrator (2 February 2013 – 21 June 2014)
- Giuseppe Piemontese (16 Apr 2014 – 29 Oct 2021 Retired)
- Francesco Antonio Soddu (2021 – 2026)
- Alfonso Raimo (15 Sep 2026 - ...)

== See also ==
- Diocese of Amelia
- Diocese of Narni

== Sources ==
=== Lists of bishops ===
- Eubel, Conradus, ed. (1913). Hierarchia catholica (in Latin). Vol. 1 (Tomus 1) (second ed.). Münster: Libreria Regensbergiana. p. 285.. Archived.
- Eubel, Conradus, ed. (1914). Hierarchia catholica (in Latin). Vol. 2 (Tomus 2) (second ed.). Münster: Libreria Regensbergiana. p. 168.. Archived.
- Eubel, Conradus, ed. (1923). Hierarchia catholica (in Latin). Vol. 3 (Tomus 3) (second ed.). Münster: Libreria Regensbergiana. p. 213.. Archived.
- Gams, Pius Bonifatius (1873). Series episcoporum Ecclesiae catholicae: quotquot innotuerunt a beato Petro apostolo (in Latin). Ratisbon: Typis et Sumptibus Georgii Josephi Manz. pp. 730–731.
- Gauchat, Patritius (Patrice) (1935). Hierarchia catholica IV (1592-1667) (in Latin). Münster: Libraria Regensbergiana. p. 252.
- Ritzler, Remigius; Sefrin, Pirminus (1952). Hierarchia catholica medii et recentis aevi. Vol. Tomus V (1667-1730). Patavii: Messagero di S. Antonio. p. 280.
- Ritzler, Remigius; Sefrin, Pirminus (1958). Hierarchia catholica medii et recentis aevi. Vol. Tomus VI (1730-1799). Patavii: Messagero di S. Antonio. p. 301.
- Ritzler, Remigius; Sefrin, Pirminus (1968). Hierarchia Catholica medii et recentioris aevi (in Latin). Vol. VII (1800–1846). Monasterii: Libreria Regensburgiana.
- Remigius Ritzler; Pirminus Sefrin (1978). Hierarchia catholica Medii et recentioris aevi (in Latin). Vol. VIII (1846–1903). Il Messaggero di S. Antonio.
- Pięta, Zenon (2002). Hierarchia catholica medii et recentioris aevi (in Latin). Vol. IX (1903–1922). Padua: Messagero di San Antonio. ISBN 978-88-250-1000-8.

=== Studies ===
- Angeloni, Francesco (1646, 1878). Storia di Terni. (in Italian) Pisa: Nistri 1878. [with notes and documents added, by Paolano Manassei]
- Cappelletti, Giuseppe (1846). Le chiese d'Italia dalla loro origine sino ai nostri giorni. (in Italian). Volume 4. Venice: Tip. Emiliana 1846), pp. 505-539.
- Kehr, Paul Fridolin (1909). Italia pontificia Vol. IV (Berlin: Weidmann 1909), pp. 18-20. (in Latin)
- Lanzoni, Francesco (1923). Le diocesi d'Italia dalle origini al principio del secolo VII (an. 604) (in Italian). Rome: Biblioteca Apostolica Vaticana. pp. 404–417.. Archived.
- Manassei, Paolino. "Alcuni Documenti per la Storia delle Città di Terni e Spoleto," (in Italian and Latin), in: Archivio storico italiano Vol. 22 (Firenze 1875), pp. 367-415.
- Moroni, Gaetano. "Terni," (in Italian), in: Dizionario di erudizione historico-ecclesiastica Vol. 74 (Venezia: Tip. Emiliana 1855) pp. 100-147.
- Pulignani Faloci, D.M. (1913). "Le origini del Cristianesimo nell' Umbria," (in Italian), in: Archivio per la storia ecclesiastica dell' Umbria Vol. 1 (Foligno 1913), pp. 17-85.
- Ughelli, Ferdinando; Coleti, Nicolò (1717). Italia sacra: sive De episcopis Italiae et insularum adjacentium (in Latin). Vol. 1 (Tomus primus). Venice: apud Sebastianum Coleti. pp. 746–766.
