= Pontifical Academy for Life =

Pontifical Academy of the Roman Catholic Church

The Pontifical Academy for Life or Pontificia Accademia per la Vita is a Pontifical Academy of the Catholic Church dedicated to promoting the Church's consistent life ethic. It also does related research on bioethics and Catholic moral theology. The academy was founded in 1994. Its members are selected by the pope and are to represent different branches of biomedical sciences to promote the Church's life ethic.

== Constitution ==
Founded in 1993, the Academy is dedicated to "study, information and formation on the principal problems of biomedicine and of law, relative to the promotion and defense of life, above all in the direct relation that they have with Christian morality and the directives of the Church's Magisterium".

Though the Academy is considered an autonomous entity, it is linked to the Pontifical Council for Pastoral Assistance to Health Care Workers and various other dicasteries of the Roman Curia.

The Academy members are named by the pope. They are selected to represent different branches of biomedical sciences and ethics which are closely linked with problems concerning the promotion and defense of life. There are also ad honorem members and corresponding members who work in the Academy's institutes and centers of study.

The Academy is responsible for the development and promotion of many of the Catholic teachings on questions of medical ethics including procreation, IVF, gene therapy, euthanasia and abortion. It was also responsible for forming, in part, the Church's response to sexual abuse allegations.

== Activities ==
On 14 February 2010, Pope Benedict XVI addressed members of the Academy to encourage them in their mission. He reiterated Catholic opposition to legislation relating to biomedical or ethical issues that is adopted without moral considerations.

In February 2012, the Academy presented a one-day workshop on moral responses to infertility, specifically the need for the scientific community to prevent infertility and develop ethical alternatives to in vitro fertilization. Academy member Josef Seifert, an Austrian philosopher, and several others later complained that the meeting included speakers who did not oppose in vitro fertilization and objected to including supporters of embryonic stem cell research to participate in a Vatican-sponsored conference on stem cell research. Cardinal Gianfranco Ravasi, head of the Pontifical Council for Culture, defended dialogue with scientists who did not share the Church's views on moral issues, while Michel Schooyans, an Academy member, said such dialogue under Vatican auspices was "compromising the Vatican" and likely to confuse the faithful.

In 2020, the Academy hosted a workshop "Roboethics: Humans, Machines and Health" that accommodated scientists and church representatives. They discussed moral issues related to the rapid development of AI and robotics, a set of values to be established around these new technologies, their role in the life of society, and the rights that should be given to humans and new forms of autonomous technology. Participants agreed on the importance of technical research and scheduled another AI-focused meeting for the next year.

In 2021 it published a report calling for a global policy shift towards home care and intergenerational community support for older people. They want to see more home assistance, ‘neighbourhood health personnel’, new models of family homes and cohabitation and other home care services to encourage people to remain at home.

In February 2022 Father Carlo Casalone SJ, a member of the Academy, called assisted suicide "the greater possible common good" in comparison to euthanasia. Nevertheless, he said this since he argued that allowing this would block a referendum on euthanasia, which was more permissive than the regulations for assisted suicide. In other words, he never cited this as doctrine of the Church or something good but as in order to block a worse thing, citing the imperfect laws principle. Despite this, many of the members of the Academy disagreed on his approach. For instance, according to the National Catholic Register, Cardinal Willem Eijk claimed that there is "no significant moral difference" between both options since both have "the same moral responsibility" in ending life. Moreover, he claimed that this would "automatically pave the way for legalizing euthanasia, because the ethical difference between both is not significant" and that the principle of "imperfect laws" does not apply since "voting for a law by which medically assisted suicide is allowed by no means implies a restriction to legalizing euthanasia".

A 2022 book, “Theological Ethics of Life” was criticised by some scholars for challenging the Church’s doctrine regarding contraception and in vitro fertilization, while it aimed to “introduce a paradigm shift,” according to Paglia, in the Church’s theological discussion of sex and contraception.

== New statutes and members, 2016 ==
On 18 October 2016, Pope Francis approved new statutes for the Academy, which ended the life terms of all its 172 current members. The statutes were made public on 5 November and scheduled to take effect on 1 January 2017. The new statutes dropped a statement Academy members had been required to sign, promising to defend life in accordance with Church teaching, though they required members to "promote and defend the principles regarding the value of life and the dignity of the human person interpreted in conformity with the Magisterium of the Church". They also established that members would be selected "without any religious discrimination" and that members would be appointed to five-year renewable terms rather than for life.

On 13 June 2017, Pope Francis appointed 45 ordinary members from 27 countries; thirteen were reappointments. A minority were Catholic clergy. Their five-year terms can be renewed until the mandatory retirement age of 80. Included were an Argentine renowned bioethicist, Rabbi Dr. Fishel Szlajen, and an Anglican priest. Academy president Vincenzo Paglia said that the inclusion of non-Catholics, "either belonging to other religions or nonbelievers", was meant to demonstrate that "the protection and promotion of human life knows no divisions and can be assured only through common endeavor". Five past leaders of the academy were also named honorary members. The members included such prominent "champions of the pro-life cause" as the American Carl A. Anderson, Supreme Knight of the Knights of Columbus, and Cardinal Willem Eijk, Archbishop of Utrecht. The new member whose views were most at odds with Church teaching was Nigel Biggar of the University of Oxford who, though an opponent of assisted suicide legislation, once suggested abortion might be licit during the first eighteen weeks of a pregnancy. Some of those not reappointed had been among the more vocal critics of Paglia or known for their "combative tone", including Michel Schooyans, professor emeritus at the Catholic University of Louvain, and Luke Gormally, a former research professor at Ave Maria School of Law.

== Leadership ==
=== Presidents of the Academy ===
- Jérôme Lejeune (1994)
- Juan de Dios Vial Correa (1994–2004)
- Elio Sgreccia (3 January 2005 – 17 June 2008)
- Salvatore Fisichella (17 June 2008 – 30 June 2010)
- Ignacio Carrasco de Paula (30 June 2010 – 15 August 2016)
- Vincenzo Paglia (15 August 2016 – 20 May 2025)
- Renzo Pegoraro (27 May 2025 – present)

== Members ==
Members include:

- Richard Doerflinger
- Wim Eijk
- John Finnis
- Anthony Fisher
- Robert Spaemann
- Lord Nicholas Windsor

== Former members ==
Former members include:

- Agni Vlavianos Arvanitis (13 July 1996 – 13 July 2011)
- John Irving Fleming (13 July 1996 – 13 July 2016)
- Michel Schooyans

== See also ==
- Global organisation of the Catholic Church
- Index of Vatican City-related articles
