= Cesare Sperelli =

18th-century Italian Roman Catholic bishop

Most Reverend Cesare Sperelli
- Bishop of Terni
- Church: Catholic Church
- Diocese: Diocese of Terni
- In office: 1698–1720
- Predecessor: Sperello Sperelli
- Successor: Teodoro Pongelli

Orders
- Ordination: 21 March 1676
- Consecration: 28 December 1698 by Fabrizio Paolucci

Personal details
- Born: 15 August 1639 Assisi, Italy
- Died: Unknown

Cesare Sperelli (born 1639) was a Roman Catholic prelate who served as Bishop of Terni (1698–1720).

== Biography ==
Cesare Sperelli was born in Assisi, Italy on 15 August 1639 and ordained a priest on 21 March 1676. On 19 December 1698, he was appointed during the papacy of Pope Innocent XII as Bishop of Terni. On 28 December 1698, he was consecrated bishop by Fabrizio Paolucci, Bishop of Ferrara, with Prospero Bottini, Titular Archbishop of Myra, and Sperello Sperelli, Bishop Emeritus of Terni, serving as co-consecrators. He served as Bishop of Terni until his resignation on 11 December 1720. While bishop, he was the principal co-consecrator of François Amédée Milliet d'Arvillars, Bishop of Aosta (1699).

== External links and additional sources ==
- Cheney, David M. "Diocese of Terni-Narni-Amelia". Catholic-Hierarchy.org. (for Chronology of Bishops) ^{[self-published]}
- Chow, Gabriel. "Diocese of Terni-Narni-Amelia (Italy)". GCatholic.org. (for Chronology of Bishops) ^{[self-published]}

Catholic Church titles
Preceded by Sperello Sperelli	Bishop of Terni; 1698–1720	Succeeded by Teodoro Pongelli
