= Antipope Victor IV =

Two antipopes used the regnal name Victor IV:

- Antipope Victor IV (1138)
- Antipope Victor IV (1159–1164)
