= Francisco Galcerán de Lloris y de Borja =

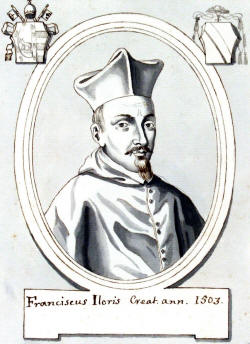
Francisco Galcerán de Lloris y de Borja

Francisco Galcerán de Lloris y de Borja (1470–22 July 1506), Catalan: Francisc de Lloris i de Borja Italian: Francesco Borgia (also known as Hiloris, Loris, Loritz, Willoritz), was an unconsecrated cardinal of the Catholic Church, and a member of the Borgia family.

== Biography ==
He was born in Valencia in 1470. He was a grand-nephew of Pope Alexander VI, and nephew of Cardinal Juan de Borja Lanzol de Romaní, el mayor. His father was Pedro Jofre de Lloris, donzell (Caballero) of Valencia. His mother was Isabel de Borja y Navarro de Alpicat, sister of Juan de Borja Lanzol; she was also related to Pope Calixtus III.

Francisco served successively as Chamberlain, Prosecretary and Treasurer to Cardinal Rodrigo de Borja, the future Pope Alexander VI, and later the Treasurer-General of the Apostolic Camera. All his later ecclesiastical titles and benefices appear to have been for his own personal gain; he never took holy orders.

He was elected Bishop of Terni on 19 March 1498. He resigned the see just over a year later (17 April 1499) in order to get the see of Elne, left vacant by the death of Cesare Borgia. He was transferred to that see on 6 September 1499, occupying it until his death. In November 1499 he was created Provost of Hildesheim.

He was named bishop in commendam (Administrator) of Valence et Die shortly after 3 January 1503; he occupied the see until 13 February 1505, the date of the appointment of Bishop Caspar de Tournon. Pope Alexander VI elevated him as Cardinal deacon in the consistory of 31 May 1503; he was published on 2 June 1503, receiving the title Deacon of Santa Sabina pro illa vice 12 June 1503.

He was promoted to Metropolitan Archbishop of Trani and named titular Latin Patriarch of Constantinople on 9 August 1503 (succeeding his uncle Juan de Borja Lanzol de Romaní, el mayor); he occupied the see until his death.

Borja participated in the first papal conclave of 1503 which elected Pope Pius III, who died shortly thereafter; he also participated in the second conclave of 1503, which elected Pope Julius II.

He exchanged the benefice of Santa Sabina for the Cardinal-deaconry of the basilica of Santa Maria Nuova on 17 December 1505, which he held until his death. He was made Abbot commendatario of Santa Maria de Ripoll in 1506, shortly before his death the same year.

Francisco Lloris y de Borja died in Rome on 22 July 1506, aged about 36, "a victim of his immoral life" (víctima de su vida inmoral).
