= Fisichella (disambiguation) =

The Fisichella family is an Italian noble family that forms part of the Sicilian nobility.

Fisichella may also refer to:

- Francesco Fisichella (born 1841), priest and philosopher
- Domenico Fisichella (born 1935), politician and professor
- Salvatore Fisichella (born 1943), operatic tenor
- Rino Fisichella (born 1951), theologian and archbishop
- Giancarlo Fisichella (born 1973), racing driver

== See also ==
- Fisichella (surname)
- Fisichella Motor Sport
