= Fisichella (surname) =

Italian surname

Fisichella is an Italian surname, originally from Sicily, present in around 130 Italian municipalities (as of 2020).

== Etymology and history ==
Fisichella is an occupational surname, derived from Medieval Latin: physicus, lit. 'physician'.

It originated in the outskirts of Catania during the Middle Ages, probably to indicate the daughter of a physician.

Between the 19th and the 20th century, the surname spread to Lombardy and Lazio.

== People named Fisichella ==
Notable people with this family name include:

- Domenico Fisichella, chaplain of Misterbianco
- Francesco Fisichella, ambassador of the city of Catania to the royal court of Madrid from 1671
- Giuseppe Fisichella, justice of the Supreme Court of the Kingdom of Sicily in 1770, 1771, 1772 and 1782
- Francesco Fisichella (1841–1908), priest, philosopher and jurist
- Domenico Fisichella (born 1935), academic and politician
- Salvatore Fisichella (born 1943), operatic tenor
- Rino Fisichella (born 1951), academic, theologian and archbishop of the Roman Catholic Church
- Giancarlo Fisichella (born 1973), racing driver

== See also ==
- Fisichella family
