= 1994 Monaco Grand Prix Formula Three =

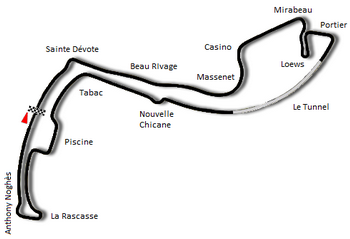
Circuit de Monaco (1986-1996)

Results from the 1994 Monaco Grand Prix Formula Three held at Monte Carlo on May 14, 1994, in the Circuit de Monaco.

== Classification ==
Pos	Driver	Constructor	Laps	Time/Retired
1	(Italy) Giancarlo Fisichella	Dallara F394-Opel	24	39.06,166
2	(Germany) Jörg Müller	Dallara F394-Fiat	24	39.07,868
3	(Germany) Sascha Maassen	Dallara F394-Opel	24	39.13,125
4	(Italy) Gianantonio Pacchioni	Dallara F393-Fiat	24	39.21,243
5	(Italy) Max Angelelli	Dallara F394-Volkswagen	24	39.22,062
6	(Germany) Michael Krumm	Dallara F394-Opel	24	39.29,070
7	(Austria) Philipp Peter	Dallara F394-Fiat	24	39.33,660
8	(Italy) Luca Riccitelli	Dallara F393-Fiat	24	39.39,060
9	(Italy) Oliver Martini	Dallara F394-Mugen	24	39.39,722
10	(Austria) Alexander Wurz	Dallara F394-Opel	24	39.40,349
11	(Italy) Luca Rangoni	Dallara F393-Fiat	24	39.41,039
12	(Italy) Gianluca Paglicci	Dallara F394-Fiat	24	39.41,492
13	(Italy) Danilo Rossi	Dallara F394-Fiat	24	40.08,687
14	(Italy) Rolando Galli	Dallara F393-Fiat	24	40.09,585
15	(Germany) Ralf Schumacher	Dallara F394-Opel	24	40.13,920
16	(Italy) Federico Gemmo	Dallara F394-Fiat	24	40.25,581
17	(Italy) Maurizio Mediani	Dallara F394-Fiat	24	40.35,972
18	(Italy) Alberto Pedemonte	Dallara F394-Fiat	23	
19	(Italy) Paolo Coloni	Dallara F394-Fiat	19	
20	(Germany) Christian Abt	Dallara F394-Opel	19	
21	(Germany) Christian Menzel	Dallara F393-Opel	18	
22	(Argentina) Norberto Fontana	Dallara F394-Opel	18	
23	(France) Jérémie Dufour	Dallara F394-Mugen	17	
24	(Italy) Dino Lamby	Dallara F394-Opel	17	
25	(Switzerland) Johnny Hauser	Dallara F394-Mugen	2	
26	(France) David Dussau	Dallara F393-Opel	1	
