= Alberto Ronchey =

Italian journalist, essayist and politician

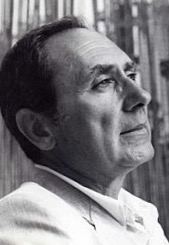

Minister of Cultural Heritage and Activities
- In office 28 April 1992 – 10 May 1994
- Prime Minister: Giuliano Amato; Carlo Azeglio Ciampi
- Preceded by: Giulio Andreotti
- Succeeded by: Domenico Fisichella

Personal details
- Born: 26 September 1926 Rome, Italy
- Died: 5 March 2010 (aged 83) Rome, Italy
- Party: Italian Republican Party
- Children: Silvia Ronchey
- Education: Sapienza University of Rome
- Profession: Journalist

Alberto Ronchey (26 September 1926 – 5 March 2010) was an Italian journalist, essayist and politician.

He was author of the term "K factor" to indicate the inability of the Western communist parties to win the elections by democratic means.

He was the Italian Minister of Cultural Heritage and Activities from 1992 to 1994 in Giuliano Amato's cabinet and subsequently Carlo Azeglio Ciampi's cabinet. He was president of RCS MediaGroup from 1994 to 1998.

== Works ==
- Le autonomie regionali e la Costituzione. Milano, Bocca, 1952.
- La Russia del disgelo. Milano, Garzanti, 1963.
- Russi e cinesi. Milano, Garzanti, 1965.
- L'ultima America. Milano Garzanti, 1967.
- Prospettive del pensiero politico contemporaneo. Torino, UTET, 1970.
- Atlante ideologico. Milano, Garzanti, 1973.
- Ultime notizie dall'URSS. Milano, Garzanti, 1974.
- La crisi Americana. Milano, Garzanti, 1975.
- Accadde in Italia: 1968-1977. Milano, Garzanti, 1977.
- Libro bianco sull'ultima generazione: tra candore e terrore. Milano, Garzanti, 1978.
- USA-URSS: i giganti malati. Milano, Rizzoli, 1981.
- Chi vincerà in Italia? La democrazia bloccata, i comunisti e il fattore K. Milano, Mondadori, 1982.
- Diverso parere. Milano Mondadori, 1983.
- Giornale contro. Milano, Garzanti, 1985.
- I limiti del capitalismo. Milano, Rizzoli, 1991. ISBN 88-17-84118-8.
- Tutelare e valorizzare un grande patrimonio: linee di azione del Governo in materia di politica dei beni culturali. Roma, Presidente del Consiglio dei Ministri, 1994.
- Fin di secolo in fax minore. Milano, Garzanti, 1995, ISBN 88-11-59847-8.
- Atlante italiano. Milano, Garzanti, 1997, ISBN 88-11-59447-2.
- Accadde a Roma nell'anno 2000. Milano, Garzanti, 1998, ISBN 88-11-59899-0.
- Il fattore R : Conversazione con Pierluigi Battista. Milano, Rizzoli, 2004. ISBN 88-17-00140-6.
- Viaggi e paesaggi in terre lontane. Milano, Garzanti, 2007, ISBN 978-88-11-74070-4.

== Sources ==
- Obituary at La repubblica
- Obituary at Il sole24ore

Political offices
Preceded by Giulio Andreotti	Italian Minister of Culture; 1992 - 1994	Succeeded by Domenico Fisichella
