= Franco Bonisolli =

Italian operatic tenor

- Born: May 25, 1938; Rovereto, Italy
- Died: October 30, 2003 (aged 65); Vienna, Austria
- Occupation: Tenor
- Years active: 1962–2003

Franco Bonisolli (May 25, 1938 – October 30, 2003) was an Italian operatic tenor renowned for his roles in the Italian repertoire, notably his roles as Manrico and Calaf.

== Life and career ==
Bonisolli was born in Rovereto, Italy. He studied with Alfredo Lattaro, and, after winning an international voice contest, he made his debut in Spoleto, as Ruggero in La rondine, in 1962. He quickly established himself throughout Italy, appearing first in lyric roles such as, Nemorino, Duca di Mantova, Alfredo, Rodolfo, des Grieux, Hoffmann, etc.

He took part in revivals of neglected opera such as La donna del lago, opposite Montserrat Caballé, and Le siège de Corinthe, opposite Beverly Sills, and took part in the creation of new works, such as Aladino e la lampada magica by Rota, and Luisilla by Mannino.

He began an international career in the early 1970s, with debut at the Vienna State Opera, the Salzburg Festival, the Paris Opéra, the Metropolitan Opera, etc., and began expanding his repertory to include more dramatic roles, notably Arnold, Don José, Manrico, Radames, Otello, Cavaradossi, Calaf, etc.

In his later career he became known for excessively long-held high notes (such as in "Di quella pira" and "Nessun dorma") and temperamental or bizarre behaviour, on and off stage. He caused a major scandal in 1978 when, after throwing his prop sword at the conductor Herbert von Karajan, he furiously left the stage just before the famous cabaletta "Di quella pira" during a public dress rehearsal of Il trovatore at the Vienna State Opera.

He can be heard on several recordings, notably Rigoletto, Il trovatore, La traviata, which were all soundtracks of German TV productions, and a live recording from the abovementioned revival of La Donna del Lago with Caballé. He also appeared in film versions of La traviata, in 1968, opposite Anna Moffo and Gino Bechi; and of Il trovatore in 1975, opposite Raina Kabaivanska, Viorica Cortez and Giorgio Zancanaro in which he sang the role of Manrico. In 1976, he recorded Mario Cavaradossi in Tosca, opposite Galina Vishnevskaya.

He died suddenly, in Vienna, at the age of 65.

== Selected recordings ==
- 1970 - Rossini - La Donna del Lago (live) - Montserrat Caballé, Franco Bonisolli, Julia Hamari, Paolo Washington - Orchestra and Chorus of the RAI, Turin, Piero Bellugi - Opera D'Oro OPD-1206.
- 1973 - Verdi - La Traviata - Mirella Freni, Franco Bonisolli, Sesto Bruscantini - Berlin State Opera Chorus and Orchestra, Lamberto Gardelli - ARTS.
- 1975 - Verdi - Il Trovatore - Franco Bonisolli, Raina Kabaivanska, Viorica Cortez, Giorgio Zancanaro, Gian Carlo Luccardi - Berlin State Opera Chorus and Orchestra, Bruno Bartoletti - ARTS.
- 1976 - Puccini - “Tosca” - Galina Vishnevskaya, FrancoBonisolli, Matteo Manuguerra, Orchestre National de France, les Choeurs de Radio France, la Maîtrise de Radio France, Mstilav Rostropovich - DEUTSCHE GRAMMOPHON.
- 1977 - Verdi - Rigoletto - Rolando Panerai, Margherita Rinaldi, Franco Bonisolli, Viorica Cortez, Bendt Rundgren - Dresden Opera Chorus and Orchestra, Francesco Molinari-Pradelli - ARTS.
- 1977 - Verdi - Il Trovatore - Leontyne Price, Elena Obraztsova, Franco Bonisolli, Piero Cappuccilli, Ruggero Raimondi - Berliner Philharmoniker, Herbert von Karajan - EMI.
- 1982 - Verdi - I Masnadieri - Joan Sutherland, Franco Bonisolli, Matteo Manuguerra, Samuel Ramey - Orchestra and Chorus of the Welsh National Opera, Richard Bonynge - DECCA.

== See also ==
- Opera
- Il trovatore
- Turandot
- Vienna State Opera

== Sources ==
- Le guide de l'opéra, les indispensables de la musique, R. Mancini & J-J. Rouvereux, (Fayard, 1986), ISBN 2-213-01563-5
