= Fisichella family =

Italian noble family

Fisichella
- Italian noble family
- Country: Italy Former countries: Sicily; Two Sicilies; Kingdom of Italy
- Etymology: Medieval Latin: physicus, lit. 'physician'
- Place of origin: Val di Catania
- Founded: 17th century
- Titles: Baron
- Style(s): "Don"

Arms of the House of Fisichella

Versions
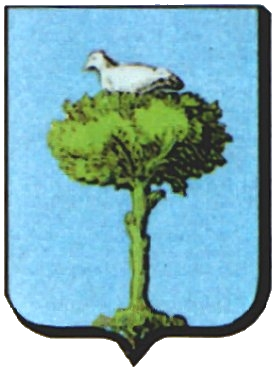
- Palizzolo Gravina (1875), p. 482

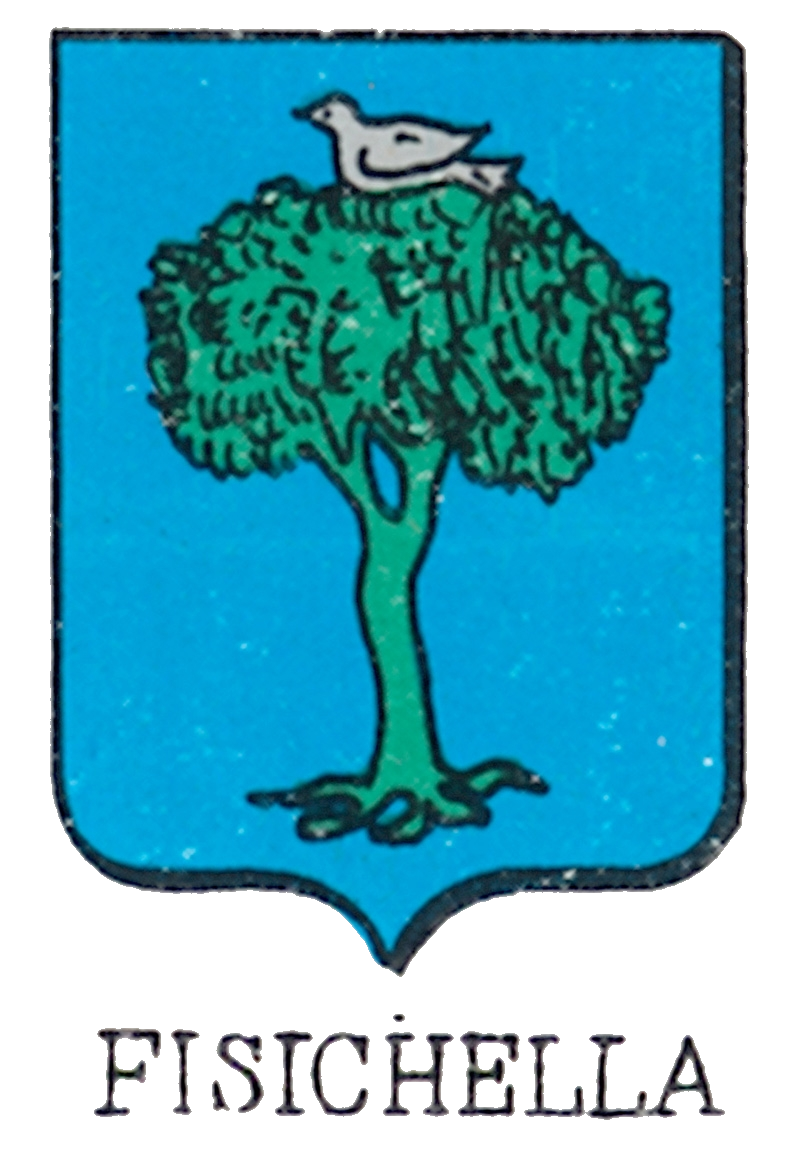
- Mango (1912)
- Shield: Azure, a tree proper topped by a turtle dove argent perched. Italian: Arma d'azzurro, con albero al naturale sormontato da una tortora appollaiata d'argento.

Fisichella is an Italian noble family, forming part of the Sicilian nobility. Members of the family include multiple judges and prelates, among them a justice of the Supreme Court of the Kingdom of Sicily and an archbishop of the Roman Catholic Church.

== History ==
Coat of arms of Rino Fisichella
- Adopted: 1998
- Shield: Gules, a tree proper eradicated, fructed or, topped by a dove argent volant, a label of the same tincture. Italian: Arma di rosso, all'albero sradicato al naturale, fruttato d'oro, sormontato da una colomba volante con le ali spiegate d'argento, al lambello dello stesso.
- Motto: Latin: VIAM VERITATIS ELEGI ('I have chosen the way of truth')
- Other elements: External ornaments for archbishops
- Inspired by the family arms.

The House of Fisichella, originally from the Val di Catania, has long been prominent in the fields of diplomacy, jurisprudence, philosophy and theology.

Among the family's forefathers, at the beginning of the 17th century Domenico Fisichella was chaplain at the monasterium album of Campanarazzu, Misterbianco, and later at the local St. Nicholas Church, while Francesco Fisichella was ambassador of the city of Catania to the royal court of Madrid since 1671.

In the 18th century, two renowned members of the family were both named Giuseppe Fisichella: the elder was referred to as 'signore don' around 1718, whereas the younger, namely Giuseppe Maria Fisichella, served as justice of the Supreme Court of the Kingdom of Sicily in the years 1770, 1771, 1772 and 1782.

Among his nephews, in the 19th century a namesake was giudice circondariale – that is commissioner and judge – of Centorbi and Mascali, in 1826 and 1830, respectively, while Ignazio Fisichella was Deputy Secretary of the General Prosecution Office of the Kingdom of Italy at the Catania Appeal Court, and later Clerk to the civil and criminal court of Nicosia. (Note: Mentioned in several numbers of the Official Gazette of the Kingdom of Italy: N. 77 (1876), N. 287 (1897).)

Meanwhile, three members of the family have been prominent in other fields, such as Francesco Fisichella (1841–1908), priest, philosopher and jurist, Domenico Fisichella (born 1935), academic and influential politician, minister and later senator of the Italian Republic, and Salvatore Fisichella (born 1943), renowned operatic tenor.

In the 20th century, two cadet branches branched off from the main line, whose family seat is located in Militello in Val di Catania, moving to Lombardy and Lazio, respectively; the first is represented by Rino Fisichella (Note: Genealogy: son of Paolo Fisichella, who moved to Codogno in 1948.) (born 1951), academic, theologian and archbishop of the Roman Catholic Church, while the second by Giancarlo Fisichella (Note: Genealogy: son of Roberto Fisichella (†2015), who moved to Pietralata.) (born 1973), famous athlete.

== In popular culture ==
A mysterious "baron Fisichella" appears several times in Leonardo Sciascia's historical novel The council of Egypt, played in the homonymous film by Gilberto Idonea.

== Bibliography ==
=== Heraldic literature ===
- Annuario della nobiltà italiana [Yearbook of the Italian nobility] (in Italian), Giovan Battista di Crollalanza (32nd ed.), Teglio, 2014 [First published 1878], Index
- Palizzolo Gravina, Vincenzo (1875) [First published 1871], Il blasone in Sicilia, ossia raccolta araldica [The coat of arms in Sicily, that is heraldic collection] (in Italian), Palermo: Visconti & Huber, pp. 183, 482
- Mango, Antonino (1912), "Da Fiorenza a Fontanetta" [From Fiorenza to Fontanetta], Nobiliario di Sicilia [Collection of the nobility of Sicily] (in Italian), Palermo: A. Reber, archived from the original on 23 September 2015

=== Non-fiction ===
- Ligresti, Domenico (2006), "Le nobiltà e la vita nobile nel sistema cortigiano europeo" [The nobilities and the noble life in the European court system] (PDF), Sicilia aperta (secoli XV-XVII): Mobilità di uomini e idee [Open Sicily (XV-XVII centuries): Mobility of men and ideas] (in Italian), Palermo: Associazione Mediterranea, p. 115, ISBN 8890239328
- Ventura, Piero (October 2009), L'Arciconfraternita dello Spirito Santo dei Napoletani a Roma tra XVI e XVIII secolo (in Italian), Rome: Aracne, p. 241, ISBN 978-88-548-2778-3
- Cancila, Rossella (2013), Autorità sovrana e potere feudale nella Sicilia moderna [Sovereign authority and feudal power in modern Sicily] (PDF) (in Italian), Palermo: Associazione Mediterranea, p. 194, ISBN 978-88-96661-39-0

=== Historical fiction ===
- Sciascia, Leonardo (1989) [First published 1963], Il consiglio d'Egitto [The council of Egypt] (in Italian) (3rd ed.), Milan: Adelphi, ISBN 9788845973598

=== Chronicle ===
- Ripartimento Polizia (1826), "Repertorio anno 1826", Repertori del Ripartimento Polizia (in Italian), Real Segreteria di Stato presso il Luogotenente Generale in Sicilia
- Ripartimento Polizia (1830), "Repertorio anno 1830" (PDF), Repertori del Ripartimento Polizia (in Italian), Real Segreteria di Stato presso il Luogotenente Generale in Sicilia, pp. 33, 46, 106
- "Supplemento al N. 149", Gazzetta Ufficiale del Regno d'Italia (in Italian), Rome: Eredi Botta, 1 April 1876, p. 40
- Boglino, Luigi (1889), I manoscritti della Biblioteca comunale di Palermo (in Italian), vol. II, Palermo: Virzì, pp. 26, 47, 239, 325
- Gazzetta Ufficiale del Regno d'Italia (in Italian), Rome: Eredi Botta, 11 December 1897, p. 5743

== See also ==
- Fisichella (surname)
