= Giorgio Zancanaro =

Italian opera singer

Giorgio Zancanaro (born 9 May 1939) is an Italian baritone, particularly associated with the Italian repertory, especially Verdi.

He studied in his native Verona with Maria Palanda and was revealed at the Verdi Competition in Busseto in 1969. He made his official operatic debut the following year in Mantua, as Riccardo in I puritani. Quickly invited to sing at all the major opera houses of Italy, he established himself as the eminent "Verdi baritone" of his generation, notably in I masnadieri, Luisa Miller, and La traviata. He made his debut at La Scala in 1982, as Ford in Falstaff, and took part in important revivals of Attila and I vespri siciliani, under Riccardo Muti.

On the international scene, he performed in major cities including London, Paris, and Zurich. He also sang at the festivals of Orange, in 1982 as Posa in Don Carlo, and Bregenz, in 1985 as Riccardo in I puritani opposite Edita Gruberova and Salvatore Fisichella.

He made his debut at the Metropolitan Opera in 1982, as Renato in Un ballo in maschera, one of his best roles. He also appeared at the San Francisco Opera and the Dallas Opera.

Zancanaro sang almost every major baritone role of the Italian repertory, and his Verdi roles show his beautiful and evenly produced voice, brilliant upper register, and stylish singing to best effect. Largely ignored by the recording companies, he can still be heard or seen in the following official recordings:

- Il cappello di paglia di Firenze with Ugo Benelli, Alfredo Mariotti, Viorica Cortez, Daniela Mazzucato RCA 1975
- Il trovatore (video) with Raina Kabaivanska, Franco Bonisolli, Viorica Cortez, dir. Bruno Bartoletti Eurodisc 1975
- Il trovatore with Raina Kabaivanska, Franco Bonisolli, Viorica Cortez, dir. Bruno Bartoletti Acanta / Arts Music 1975
- Il trovatore with Plácido Domingo, Rosalind Plowright, Brigitte Fassbaender, Evgeny Nesterenko, dir. Carlo Maria Giulini DG 1983
- Don Carlo (DVD) with Luis Lima, Ileana Cotrubas, Robert Lloyd, Bruna Baglioni, dir. Bernard Haitink Castle Vision 1985
- Andrea Chenier with Plácido Domingo, Anna Tomowa-Sintow, dir. Humphrey Burton, Covent Garden 1985
- Andrea Chenier with José Carreras, Eva Marton, dir. Giuseppe Patanè CBS 1985
- La forza del destino with Mirella Freni, Plácido Domingo, Paul Plishka, Sesto Bruscantini, dir. Riccardo Muti EMI 1986
- Madama Butterfly (DVD) with Yasuko Hayashi, Peter Dvorský, dir. Keita Asart Pioneer Artist 1986
- Guglielmo Tell with Chris Merritt, Cheryl Studer, Luigi Roni, dir. Riccardo Muti Philips 1988
- Rigoletto with Daniela Dessì, Vincenzo La Scola, Paata Burchuladze, dir. Riccardo Muti EMI 1988
- I vespri siciliani with Chris Merritt, Cheryl Studer, Ferruccio Furlanetto, dir. Riccardo Muti EMI 1989
- Attila with Samuel Ramey, Cheryl Studer, Neil Shicoff, dir. Riccardo Muti EMI 1990
- Attila (DVD) with Samuel Ramey, Cheryl Studer, Kaludi Kaludov, dir. Riccardo Muti Fonit-Cetra 1991
- La traviata (DVD) with Edita Gruberova, Neil Shicoff, dir. Carlo Rizzi Teldec 1992
- Tosca with Carol Vaness, Giuseppe Giacomini, dir. Riccardo Muti Philips 1992
- Falstaff with Walter Berry, Francisco Araiza, dir. Lorin Maazel Orfeo 2009 (1983 live performance)

== General sources ==
- Le guide de l'opéra, les indispensables de la musique, R. Mancini & J-J. Rouveroux, (Fayard, 1995), ISBN 2-213-59567-4
