= Otello (López Cobos recording) =

- Philips Records LP: 6769 023

Studio album by Jesús López Cobos
- Released: 1979
- Genre: Opera
- Length: 153:11
- Language: Italian
- Label: Philips
- Producer: Erik Smith

Otello
- Philips Records CD: 432 456 2

Otello is a 153-minute studio album of Gioachino Rossini's opera Otello, performed by José Carreras, Nucci Condò, Salvatore Fisichella, Alfonso Leoz, Keith Lewis, Gianfranco Pastine, Samuel Ramey and Frederica von Stade with the Ambrosian Chorus and the Philharmonia Orchestra under the direction of Jesús López Cobos. It was released in 1979.

== Background ==
Following Otello's première in Naples in 1816, Rossini wrote an alternative version of the opera which replaced its climax with a different, happier conclusion. (Opera Rara's issue of the opera, conducted by David Parry, includes this alternative ending in an appendix.) Jesús López Cobos's album presents the opera in accordance with Rossini's original autograph score.

The album was the first studio recording of the opera ever undertaken.

== Recording ==
The album was recorded using analogue technology in September 1978 at an unidentified location in London.

== Packaging ==
The cover of the CD edition of the album, designed under the art direction of Ton Friesen, features a photograph by Hans Morren.

== Critical reception ==
=== Reviews ===
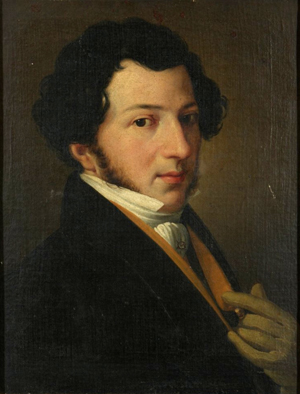
Rossini in circa 1815, shortly before Otello was first performed

Alan Blyth reviewed the album on LP in Gramophone in September 1979. Recalling how Stendhal had rhapsodized over the opera, he expressed regret that it had fallen into a degree of obscurity. Berio's libretto, it was true, was a travesty of Shakespeare, but Rossini's alchemy had turned its lead into gold. The work was "full of music that [was] mellifluous and affecting", and though it was not the last word in psychological profundity, in between its occasional barren pages there were others that plumbed genuine depths of feeling. Indeed, there were moments in which Rossini had rivalled, or maybe surpassed, what Giuseppe Verdi had done with the story seven decades later. But whatever one thought of Rossini's score, there was no doubting that López Cobos's album could hardly have put the case for it more persuasively. As Desdemona, Frederica von Stade exhibited her "accustomed control and feeling for the shape of a phrase", singing even more beautifully than she had in the excerpt from the opera that she had included in her early recital disc of bel canto arias. Her one failing was that her diction left something to be desired. She showed an "increasing tendency to smooth away consonants in the interests of suave tone", and her recitatives suffered accordingly. As Emilia, Nucci Condò sang with a voice so like von Stade's that it was sometimes difficult to tell the maidservant from her mistress, though the similarity of their timbres made for an exquisite blending in their Act 1 duet. (Stendhal, Blyth noted, had thought the duet the best thing in the entire score.) In the opera's title role, José Carreras made "as much as he [could] of a part that [offered] little in the way of pathos". He was equally credible as a proud soldier, a tormented lover and a man agonizing on the brink of becoming a murderer. Salvatore Fisichella brought an astonishing virtuosity to the opera's most demanding role, Rodrigo. With his "pleasingly clean, open tone and rapid vibrato", he negotiated his character's roulades, coloratura and excruciating tessitura with virtually no apparent effort. The opera's third tenor, Gianfranco Pastine, did well, too, as Iago - a smaller part than in Verdi or Shakespeare - and sang with a timbre that was different enough from Carreras's or Fisichella's to obviate confusion. Samuel Ramey was effective as Desdemona's irate father, and Alfonso Leoz was a poetic Gondolier in his brief offstage contribution to Desdemona's Willow Song scene. The orchestra played attentively, and López Cobos conducted with great skill, emphasizing the moments when Rossini was at his most inspired and making it easy to overlook passages in which the composer's powers of fantasy had faltered. The audio quality of the album was excellent, with the singers and instrumentalists balanced judiciously and projected clearly. In sum, Philips's recording was "an issue that should be in all operatic collections worthy of the name."

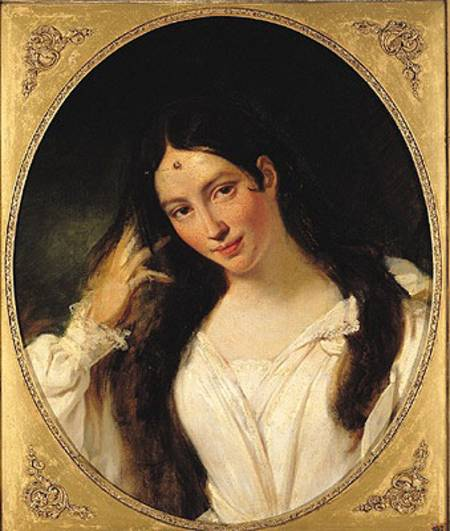
François Bouchot's 1834 portrait of Maria Malibran as Desdemona

William Livingstone reviewed the album on LP in Stereo Review in December 1979. He urged his readers not to allow their admiration of Verdi's Otello to deter them from exploring Rossini's treatment of the story. There was no denying that, in his first two Acts, Rossini had clung tenaciously to hoary opera seria convention. And there was something disconcerting in hearing scenes of high drama sung with an orchestral accompaniment that was incongruously buoyant. But Rossini's writing had "classic elegance" as well as "expressiveness and excitement", and was never "arid or tedious". Moreover, in his climactic Act 3 he had transcended tradition and found a new style that was "more personal and 'modern'" - the musicologist Philip Gossett had argued that this Act was where eighteenth-century Italian opera had truly ended and a new epoch begun. But whether Rossini's opera was really a masterpiece or not, Philips had produced a fine recording of it. "The versatile Frederica von Stade is so convincing as Desdemona", Livingstone wrote, "that it is difficult to believe that she has never performed this role on stage." Rossini had given Desdemona "many long-lined, plaintive melodies", and von Stade "[span] them out beautifully, always with full attention to the meaning of the words and" - pace Blyth - "with excellent diction." Nucci Condò, whose timbre Livingstone thought fruitier than von Stade's, was good as Emilia. Philips had been shrewd in casting the album's three principal tenor roles, choosing singers with voices that were easy to tell apart from one another and that were well suited to the different kinds of music that Rossini had written for them. José Carreras came to the title role with a voice that had lately "grown somewhat darker and heavier", but it "retained its sweetness and inherent beauty of tone". The brighter-sounding Salvatore Fisichella was the ideal man for Rodrigo's sparkling coloratura. And Gianfranco Pastine conveyed Iago's malevolence convincingly. Samuel Ramey, the opera's solitary, "sonorous" bass, supplied the somber tints that were needed to complete Rossini's chiaroscuro. Philips's production team had done their work admirably, balancing soloists and orchestra unimpeachably and making intelligent use of the stereo soundstage to create the illusion of a theatrical presentation without perpetrating any obtrusive trickery. With "impressive" conducting by López Cobos, the "splendid" album was "something that [had] become rare in operatic recordings, a real performance".

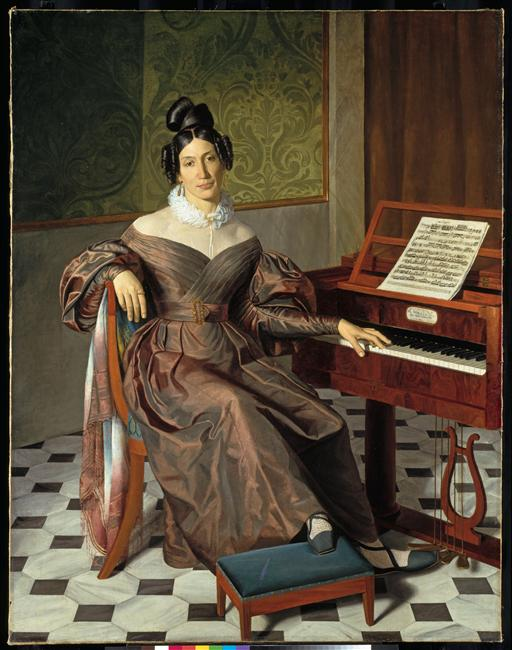
The first Desdemona, Isabella Colbran, painted by Johann Baptist Reiter in circa 1835

J. B. Steane reviewed the album on LP in Gramophone in January 1980. He thought Rossini's opera good in some respects, less so in others. He was not troubled by the distance between Berio's plot and Shakespeare's, but he was uneasy about Rossini's use of the same mannerisms that were ubiquitous in his comic works. On the positive side, the opera contained "genuine inspiration" and several kinds of beauty, from the "brilliance and ornamentation" of its Act 1 quartet to the "unadorned, unaffected simplicity of utterance" of the Willow Song and Prayer. What impressed him most about the "fine" album itself was the performance of its stars. "Carreras and von Stade cope wonderfully well", he wrote. "I don't think we have had a full-voiced spinto type of tenor singing runs like this since the very early years of the century."

Richard Osborne reviewed the opera on CD in Gramophone in December 1992. Although a Rossini enthusiast, he conceded that some parts of the score were less inspired than others. Its Act 3 was so powerful that it had long deterred Verdi from beginning his own Otello, but the rest of the opera was "flashy rodomontade" with "the odd mauvais quart-d'heure". Philips's album, though, had no weaknesses at all. Frederica von Stade's Desdemona was "chaste and as luminous as a sculpture in Carrara marble". José Carreras's Otello was a "searingly noble Moor". Salvatore Fisichella and Gianfranco Pastine emerged "with honour, barely bloodied and never for a moment bowed" by Rossini's merciless demands on their virtuosity. The album as a whole was fresh and scintillating - the fruit of first-class scholarship, luxurious casting and immaculate engineering. It was an essential purchase for all "lovers of memorable opera memorably performed".

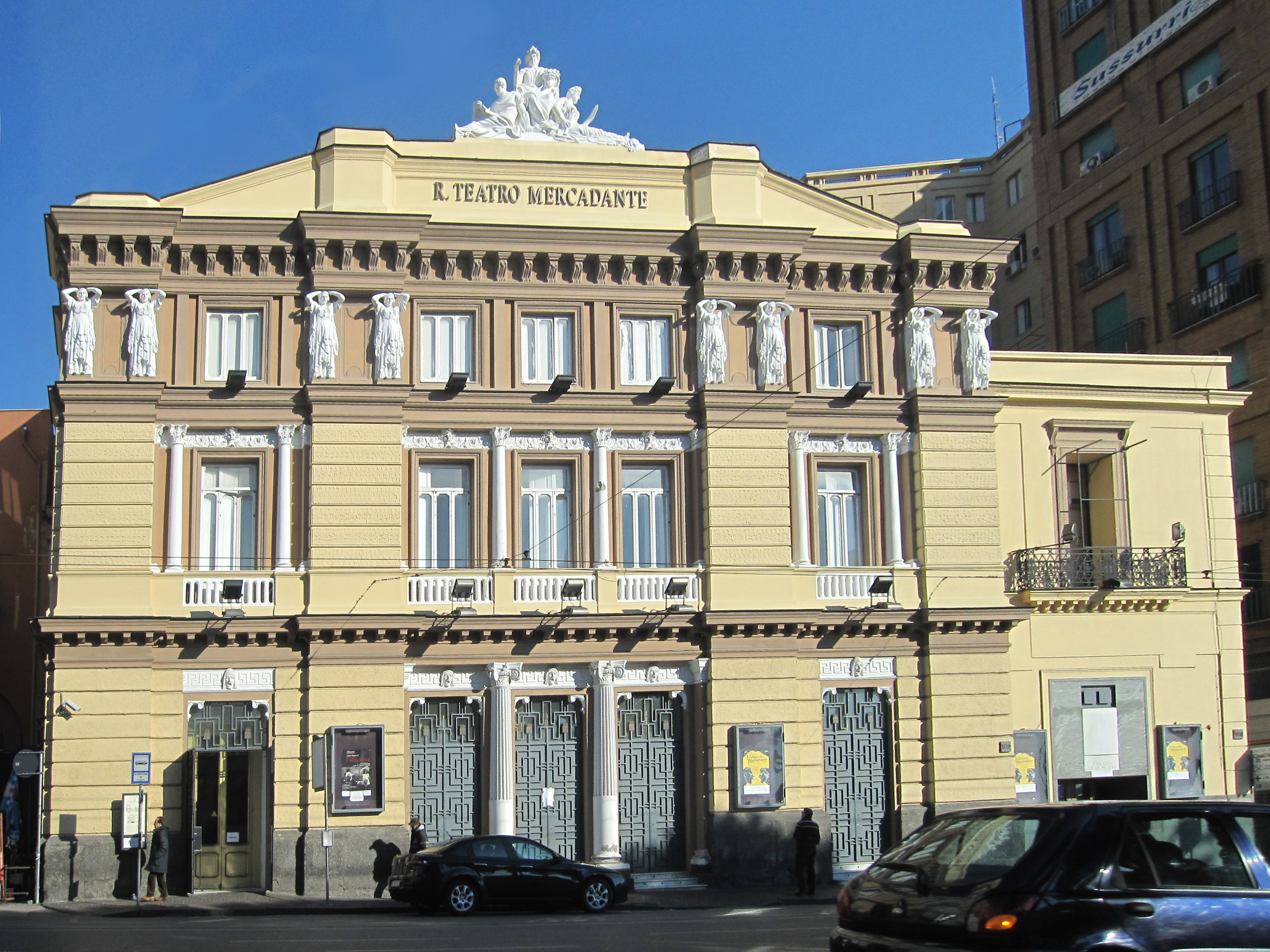
Otello was first performed in Naples's Teatro del Fondo, now known as the Teatro Mercadante

Osborne revisited the album in Gramophone in February 2000, comparing it with a new, Opera Rara issue of the opera conducted by David Parry. Philips's set still seemed to him to be well nigh perfect. Carreras's Otello could perhaps be criticized as "sub-Verdian", but was nevertheless compellingly and enjoyably performed. The youthful Samuel Ramey's Elmiro was a powerful characterization enhanced by "marvellous articulation and a flawless sense of how to 'place' the voice in ... ensembles". Conducting, López Cobos had found a way to maintain the impetus of the opera's drama while at the same time allowing his singers the opportunity to let Rossini's bel canto work its magic. With a spacious, unvaryingly realistic acoustic, Philips' 1970s album was unequivocally preferable to Opera Rara's rival.

=== Accolade ===
Revisiting the album in Gramophone in December 1979, Alan Blyth included it in his Critic's Choice list of the best recordings of the year.

== Track listing: CD1 ==
Gioachino Rossini (1792-1868)

Otello ossia Il Moro di Venezia (Naples, 1816), tragedia lirica in tre atti, with a libretto by Francesco Maria Berio, Marchese di Salsa

- 1 (8:23) Overture

Act One

No. 1, Introduction

- 2 (3:34) "Viva Otello" (Chorus)
- 3 (1:48) March

No. 2, Duet and chorus

- 4 (2:40) "Vincemmo, a prodi" (Otello, Doge, Iago, Rodrigo)
- 5 (7:08) "Ah! Sì, per voi già sento" (Otello, Iago, Chorus)

No. 3, Recitative and duet

- 6 (3:07) "Rodrigo!" (Elmiro, Rodrigo, Iago)
- 7 (5:16) "No, non temer" (Iago, Rodrigo)

No. 4, Recitative and duet

- 8 (6:23) "Inutile è quel pianto" (Emilia, Desdemona)
- 9 (4:11) "Vorrei, che il tuo pensiero" (Desdemona, Emilia)

No. 5, Finale I

- 10 (5:20) "Ma che miro?" (Desdemona, Iago, Rodrigo, Elmiro, Emilia)
- 11 (4:09) "Santo Imen!" (Chorus)
- 12 (1:04) "Dove son? Che mai veggio?" (Desdemona, Elmiro, Rodrigo, Emilia)
- 13 (4:41) "Nel cor d'un padre amante" (Elmiro, Rodrigo, Desdemona)
- 14 (4:08) "Ti parli d'amore" (Rodrigo, Elmiro, Desdemona)
- 15 (3:11) "L'infida, ahimè che miro?" (Otello, Chorus, Rodrigo, Elmiro)
- 16 (5:49) "Incerta l'anima" (Chorus, Rodrigo, Otello, Desdemona, Elmiro)

Act Two

No. 6, Recitative and aria

- 17 (1:40) "Lasciami" (Desdemona, Rodrigo)
- 18 (6:04) "Che ascolto?" (Rodrigo)

== Track listing: CD2 ==
Act Two, continued

No. 7, Recitative and duet

- 1 (2:25) "M'abbandonò, disparve" (Desdemona, Emilia)
- 2 (5:39) "Che feci?" (Otello, Iago)
- 3 (4:02) "Non m'inganno" (Otello, Iago)
- 4 (2:29) "L'ira d'avverso fato" (Otello, Iago)

No. 8, Recitative and trio

- 5 (0:52) "E a tanto giunger puote" (Otello, Rodrigo)
- 6 (8:59) "Ah vieni, nel tuo sangue" (Rodrigo, Otello, Desdemona)
- 7 (2:30) "Tra tante smanie" (Rodrigo, Desdemona, Otello)

No. 9, Finale II

- 8 (2:06) "Desdemona! Che veggo" (Emilia, Desdemona)
- 9 (5:48) "Che smania. Oimè! Che affanni" (Desdemona, Chorus, Elmiro)
- 10 (3:04) "L'error d'un' infelice" (Desdemona, Chorus, Elmiro)

Act Three

No. 10, Recitative, aria, duet and Finale III

- 11 (3:51) "Ah! - Dagli affanni oppressa" (Desdemona, Emilia)
- 12 (5:07) "Nessun maggior dolore" (Gondoliere, Desdemona, Emilia)

Canzona and recitative

- 13 (9:01) "Assisa a' piè d'un salice... Che dissi!" (Desdemona, Emilia)
- 14 (2:28) "Deh calma, o Ciel nel sonno" (Desdemona)
- 15 (6:50) "Eccomi giunto inosservato" (Otello, Desdemona)

Duet

- 16 (2:53) "Non arrestare, il colpo" (Desdemona, Otello)
- 17 (2:24) "Notte per me funesta" (Desdemona, Otello)
- 18 (3:33) "Che sento... Chi batte?" (Otello, Lucio, Doge, Elmiro, Rodrigo, Chorus)

== Personnel ==
=== Performers ===
- Alfonso Leoz (tenor), Gondolier & Doge of Venice
- Salvatore Fisichella (tenor), Rodrigo, son of the Doge
- José Carreras (tenor), Otello, a victorious Moorish General in the Venetian army
- Frederica von Stade (mezzo-soprano), Desdemona, in love with Otello but promised to Rodrigo
- Samuel Ramey (bass), Elmiro, father of Desdemona
- Gianfranco Pastine (tenor), Iago, secretly enamoured of Desdemona
- Nucci Condò (mezzo-soprano), Emilia, maidservant and confidante of Desdemona
- Keith Lewis (tenor), Lucio, a follower of Otello
- Sioned Williams, harp
- Ambrosian Chorus (chorus master: John McCarthy)
- Philharmonia Orchestra
- Jesús López Cobos, conductor

=== Other ===
- Richard Nunn, conductor's assistant
- Ubaldo Gardini, music and language adviser
- Erik Smith, producer

== Release history ==
In 1979, Philips Classics Records released the album as a triple LP (catalogue number 6769 023) and a double cassette (catalogue number 7699 110), both with notes, texts and translations.

In 1992, Philips Classics Records issued the album as a double CD (catalogue number 432 456 2), packaged in a slipcase with a 172-page booklet. The booklet contained synopses, libretti and an essay by the Rossini scholar Philip Gossett, all of them in English, French, German and Italian, as well as an engraving of Rossini, a publicity photograph of Carreras taken by Clive Barda and production photographs of the album's other singers and López Cobos taken by Mike Evans. The opera was later reissued in different packaging as part of Philips's DUO and Decca's grandOPERA ranges.
