= Giancarlo Fisichella =

Italian racing driver (born 1973)

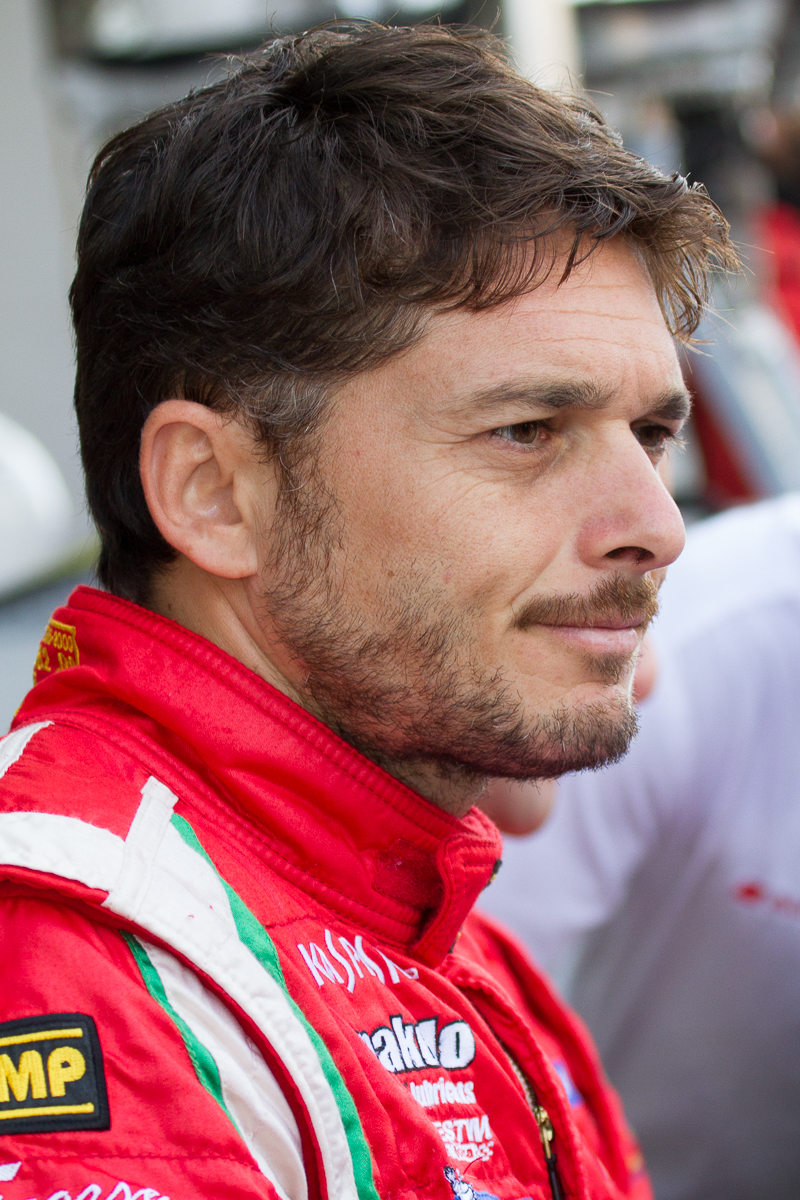
- Fisichella at the 2012 6 Hours of Fuji
- Born: 14 January 1973 (age 53); Rome, Italy
- Spouse: Luna Castellani (m. 2009)
- Children: 3
- Family: Fisichella family

Formula One World Championship career
- Nationality: (Italy) Italian
- Active years: 1996–2009
- Team(s): Minardi, Jordan, Benetton, Sauber, Renault, Force India, Ferrari
- Entries: 231 (229 starts)
- Championships: 0
- Wins: 3
- Podiums: 19
- Career points: 275
- Pole positions: 4
- Fastest laps: 2
- First entry: 1996 Australian Grand Prix
- First win: 2003 Brazilian Grand Prix
- Last win: 2006 Malaysian Grand Prix
- Last entry: 2009 Abu Dhabi Grand Prix

FIA World Endurance Championship career
- Categorisation: FIA Platinum
- Years active: 2012–2022
- Teams: AF Corse, Iron Lynx
- Starts: 45
- Championships: 0
- Wins: 7
- Podiums: 15
- Poles: 1
- Fastest laps: 1
- Best finish: 2nd in 2013 (LMGTE Pro)

24 Hours of Le Mans career
- Years: 2010–2022
- Teams: AF Corse, Risi, Iron Lynx
- Best finish: 13th (2011, 2014)
- Class wins: 2 (2012, 2014)

Awards
- 1998: Lorenzo Bandini Trophy

Giancarlo "Giano" Fisichella (Italian pronunciation: [dʒaŋˈkarlo fiziˈkɛlla]; born 14 January 1973), nicknamed Fisico and Fisi, is an Italian racing driver and motorsport executive who competed in Formula One from 1996 to 2009. Fisichella won three Formula One Grands Prix across 14 seasons.

Born and raised in Rome, Fisichella is a member of the noble Fisichella family of Sicily. After starting his career in kart racing, he progressed to Italian Formula Three in 1992, winning the title in 1994 with RC Motorsport, as well as the Monaco F3 Grand Prix. Following a season in the Deutsche Tourenwagen Meisterschaft, Fisichella graduated to Formula One with Minardi in 1996, debuting at the Australian Grand Prix. He moved to Jordan for 1997, achieving his maiden podium finishes at the Canadian and Belgian Grands Prix. He joined Benetton in 1998 with multiple further podiums, as well as his maiden pole position at the Austrian Grand Prix. Several podiums followed across his remaining three seasons at Enstone: one in 1999, three in 2000—where he finished sixth in the World Drivers' Championship—and one in 2001.

Fisichella returned to Jordan in 2002, where he claimed his maiden win at the wet-weather Brazilian Grand Prix the following year; his victory was declared after five days of deliberation and court proceedings due to a timekeeping error classifying him second. He partnered Felipe Massa at Sauber for his 2004 campaign, scoring several points finishes. His return to Enstone with Renault in 2005 alongside Fernando Alonso was headlined by his debut victory from pole in Australia, claiming multiple further podiums as he finished fifth overall. He achieved a career-best fourth in the World Drivers' Championship in 2006, winning the Malaysian Grand Prix from pole as he helped Renault win back-to-back World Constructors' Championships. After a winless 2007 campaign, Fisichella joined Force India for 2008 and 2009, finishing second from pole at the latter Belgian Grand Prix; he replaced an injured Massa at Ferrari for the final five rounds and remained their reserve driver through 2010. Fisichella departed Formula One with three victories, four pole positions, two fastest laps, and 19 podium finishes.

Following his departure from Formula One, Fisichella moved into sportscar racing with AF Corse, winning the Le Mans Series in 2011 and the FIA World Endurance Championship and 24 Hours of Le Mans in 2012 in the GTE class. He again took a class victory at Le Mans in 2014, when he moved to the IMSA SportsCar Championship with Risi Competizione. He later returned to WEC from 2018 to 2022, after which he shifted to Italian GT3. Beyond driving, he founded the eponymous Fisichella Motor Sport in 2005, managing the team in the GP2 Series from 2006 to 2009.

== Junior racing career ==
Like most current Formula One drivers, Fisichella began kart racing as a youngster in the Guidonia's Kart circuit. In 1992, he competed in the Italian Formula Three Championship, racing for the RC Motorsport team. He finished runner up in 1993, and in 1994, he won the championship, following race victories in Monaco and Macau. He left open-wheel racing briefly in 1995 and 1996, driving for Alfa Romeo in the International Touring Car Championship.

In June 1997, Fisichella made a one-off appearance at Spa in the Belgian Procar Championship, driving for the works Peugeot team. He stood in for Vincent Radermecker and came second.

== Formula One career ==
=== Minardi (1996) ===
In 1996, Fisichella made the move to Formula One, making his debut for the Minardi team, after being the official test driver the previous season. However he did not complete the full season since Minardi required a driver who could bring funding to the team, and replaced Fisichella with Giovanni Lavaggi.

=== Jordan (1997) ===
In 1997, Fisichella made the move to Eddie Jordan's eponymous team, where he drove alongside former F1 champion Michael Schumacher's brother Ralf, himself a former Formula Nippon champion. Fisichella gained his first podium finish at the 1997 Canadian Grand Prix, and went on to finish higher in the points standings than his teammate. At Hockenheim, a victory looked to be within reach for Fisichella, but a puncture and the performance of an on-form Gerhard Berger denied him the win. Fisichella was able to show his talent again at the rain-soaked Belgian Grand Prix in which he finished a commendable second behind Michael Schumacher. Following this race, the Benetton team signed him for 1998.

=== Benetton (1998–2001) ===
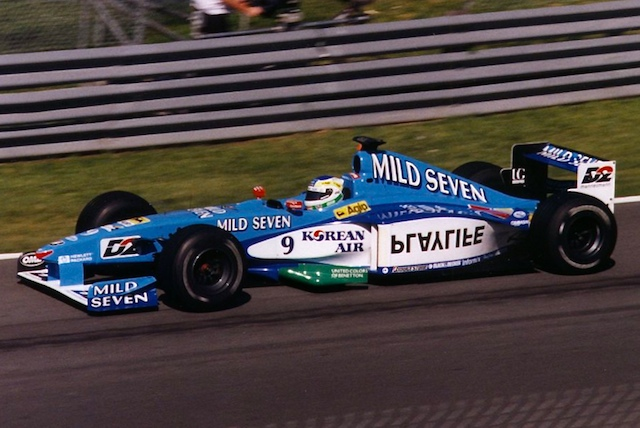
Fisichella driving for Benetton at the 1999 Canadian Grand Prix.

Following Renault's withdrawal from Formula One, Benetton would contest the 1998 season without factory-supplied engines, instead using rebranded development versions of 1997 Renault engines. Despite not having the latest engines, Fisichella still managed second places at Montreal and Monaco, and was in contention for a victory in Canada until gearbox problems slowed him down. In Austria, Fisichella scored his first pole position. However, an on-track clash with Jean Alesi during the race cost him any chance of a good result. He was then able to add only two more points to his total in the second half of the year as Benetton lost ground on their competition.

1999 proved to be a similarly inconsistent season. Fisichella did score some points finishes, including second at Montreal, and again came close to a victory in the European Grand Prix, until he spun off whilst in the lead. This would prove to be his best chance of a victory for the next few seasons.

Fisichella's season was to follow a similar pattern in 2000. He again gained some surprise podium finishes early in the year in Brazil, Germany, Monaco, and Canada. However, Benetton's poor second half of the season meant that he failed to score any more points. After his first Benetton year, when he finished one point behind him, Fisichella had comprehensively outperformed his Austrian teammate Alexander Wurz, who would then leave the team to make way for British driver Jenson Button in 2001. Renault had purchased the Benetton team after the start of the 2000 season, but their radical engine design meant Benetton had an uncompetitive 2001 car, and as a result, Fisichella was battling for much of the season with teams such as Minardi and Prost. However, the efforts of technical director Mike Gascoyne and his staff did result in improvements over the year, culminating in a 4–5 finish at the German Grand Prix and a third-place finish for Fisichella at the Belgium race. Although Fisichella had gained the team's best results that season and consistently outperformed Button, he was not retained by the team, so he rejoined Jordan for 2002.

=== Return to Jordan (2002–2003) ===
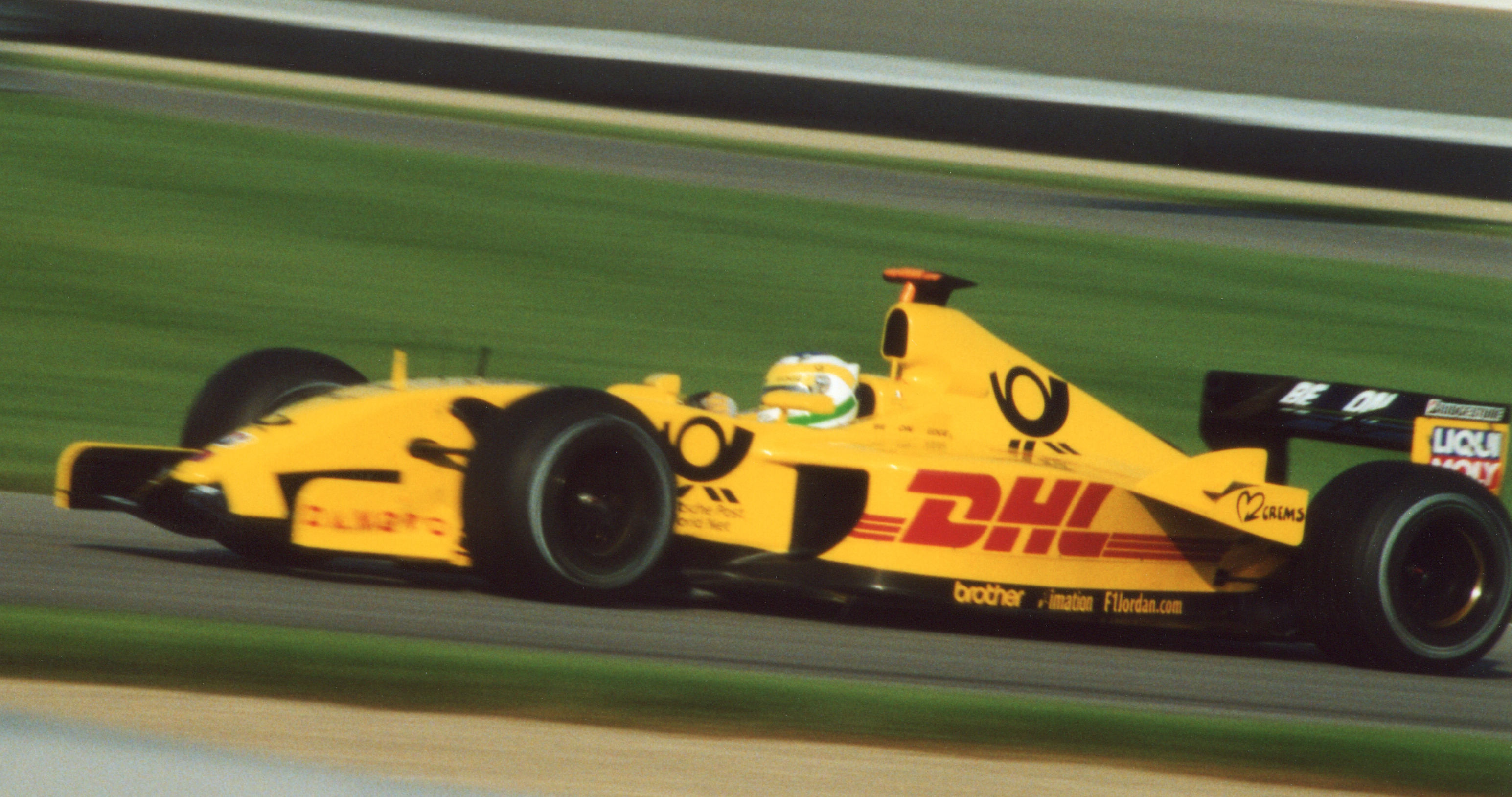
Fisichella driving for Jordan at the 2002 US GP.

Fisichella scored seven points in 2002, while comfortably outpacing new teammate Takuma Sato, although the Jordan-Honda car of that year was never truly competitive. After Honda withdrew their engine supply, Jordan switched to Ford engines for the 2003 season, but the team were still unable to compete with the top teams on the grid. Despite this lack of performance, Fisichella won his first race at the Brazilian Grand Prix. Battling with McLaren's Kimi Räikkönen amidst heavy rain and numerous crashes, Fisichella took the race lead on lap 54, just before the race was red-flagged. However, he was demoted to second place on the podium, because under the regulations, the race results were declared at two laps before the red flag, at which point Räikkönen was thought to have been the race leader. Several days later, though, the FIA determined that Fisichella had already begun his 56th lap before the red flag, meaning that he, and not Räikkönen, had been leading the race two laps before its premature end, awarding the Italian his first F1 victory, and he became the only F1 driver to have won a race without having stood atop the podium. He collected the winner's trophy at the next race at Imola. Fisichella's only other points finish of 2003 was to be a seventh place at Indianapolis.

=== Sauber (2004) ===
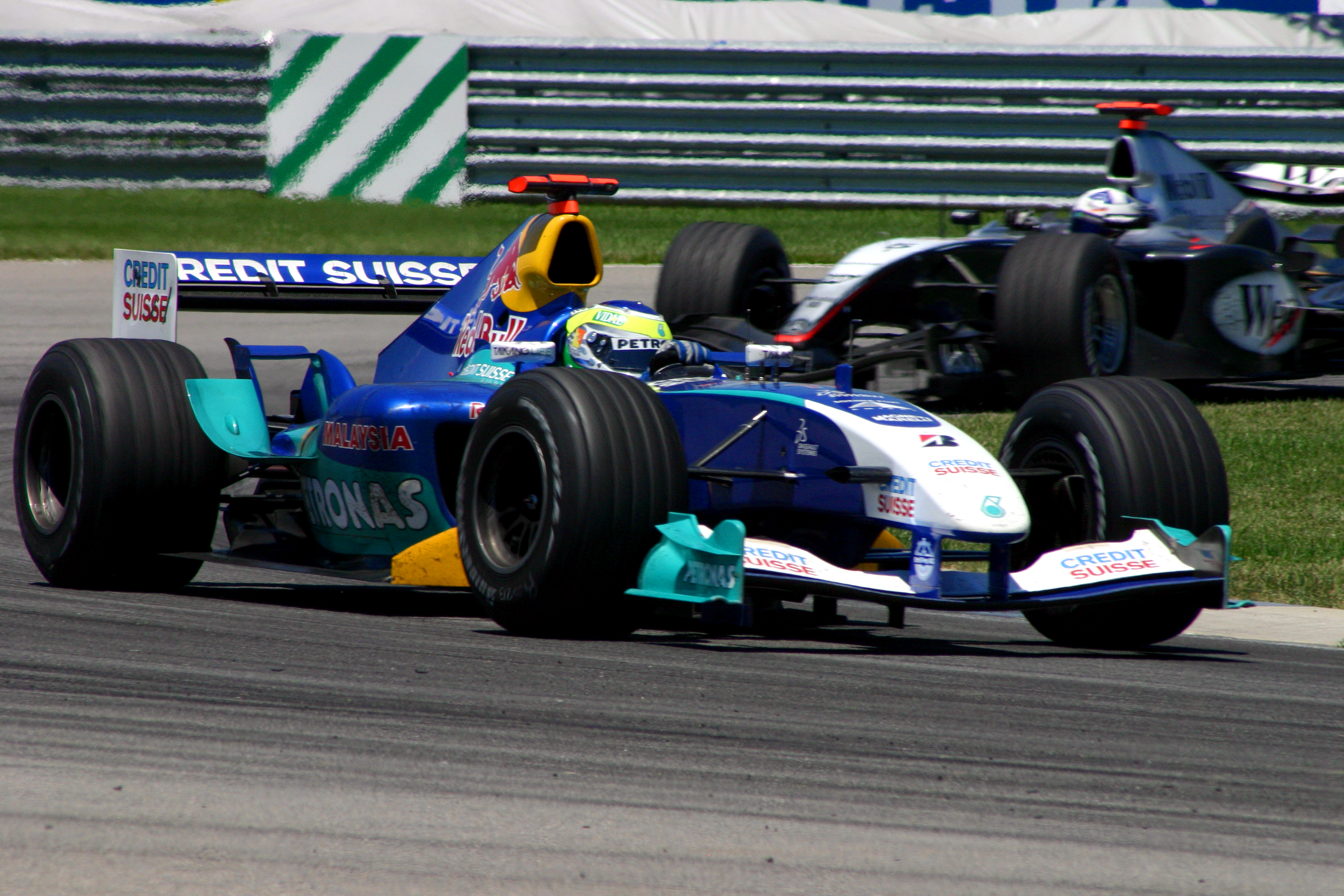
Fisichella driving for Sauber at the 2004 US GP.

Unhappy with the Jordan team's performance, Fisichella moved to Sauber in 2004 in the hope of greater results, and using the team as a way of gaining access to drive for the 2003 World Champions Ferrari, who supplied re-badged engines to the Sauber team. Fisichella drove well all year, comfortably outpacing teammate Felipe Massa for much of the season (scoring 22 championship points vs Massa's 12).

=== Renault (2005–2007) ===
==== 2005 ====
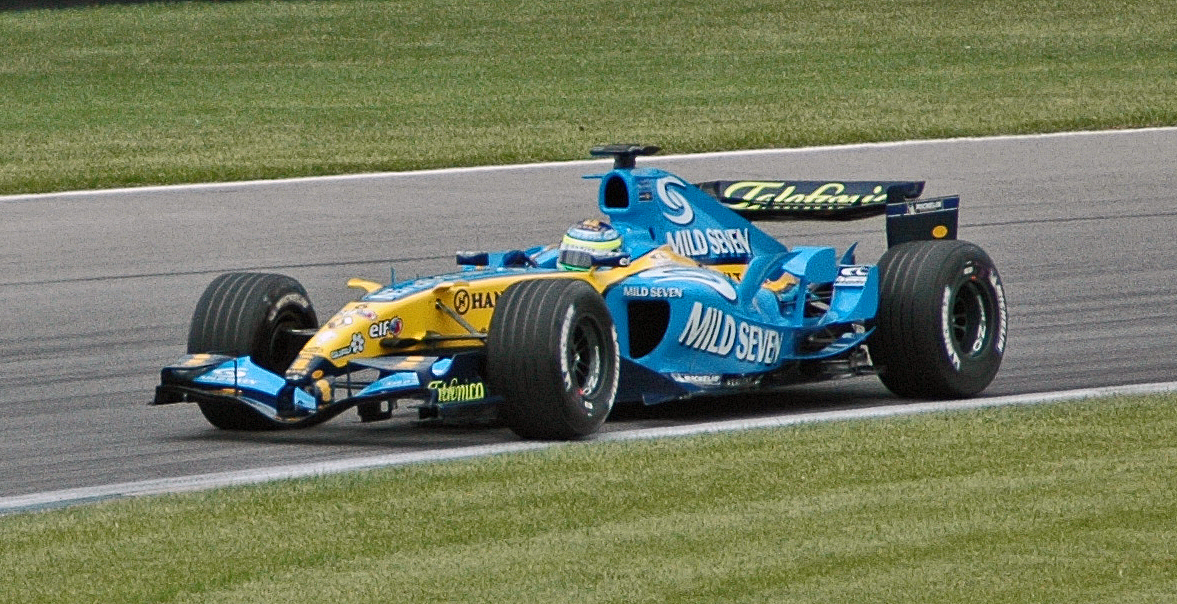
Fisichella at the 2005 United States Grand Prix.

Fisichella's strong performances prompted his former Benetton-Renault team boss Flavio Briatore to re-sign him for the 2005 season as partner to the young Spanish driver Fernando Alonso. A win at the season opening race at Melbourne signalled the Formula One breakthrough that commentators had been predicting, but it proved to be something of a false dawn. A run of poor luck saw Fisichella fall behind his teammate in the championship standings, and at times the pair were achieving noticeably different lap times with the same equipment. It appeared that Fisichella simply did not have the pace to match Alonso.

The difference in pace between Fisichella and Alonso was noticeable, and while Alonso's metronomic consistency helped him win the championship, Fisichella's general bad luck was to cost him points finishes. He was overtaken and lost the lead on the final lap of the Japanese Grand Prix by McLaren driver Kimi Räikkönen, despite his race engineer urging him to avoid letting Räikkönen past, which earned him heavy criticism from the press. Nevertheless, his performances alongside Alonso throughout the season enabled Renault to win the World Constructors' Championship ahead of McLaren and Ferrari, the latter of which had won that title the previous six seasons.

==== 2006 ====
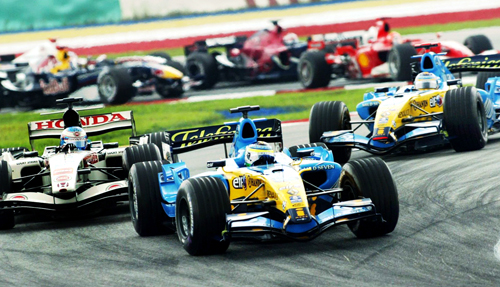
Fisichella won the 2006 Malaysian Grand Prix for Renault.

2006 proved to be a similar season for Fisichella. Having won in Malaysia, putting in a strong performance to win from the pole position. However, he failed to maintain that pace for the upcoming races and even failed to reach the top ten in qualifying for two races. This form, in addition to a penalty in Monaco for allegedly impeding David Coulthard, meant Fisichella was again unable to challenge his teammate Alonso for the Drivers' Championship. Some strong results in the second half of the 2006 season, including finishing ahead of Alonso at the US Grand Prix, enabled Fisichella to obtain his best results: Fourth in the World Drivers' Championship with 72 points, one win, and five podium finishes. After finishing third in Japan, Fisichella dedicated the result to his best friend, Tonino Visciani, who died of a heart attack on the Thursday before the race. Nevertheless, he was able to get a sixth-place finish in Brazil to secure the Constructors' title for Renault.

==== 2007 ====
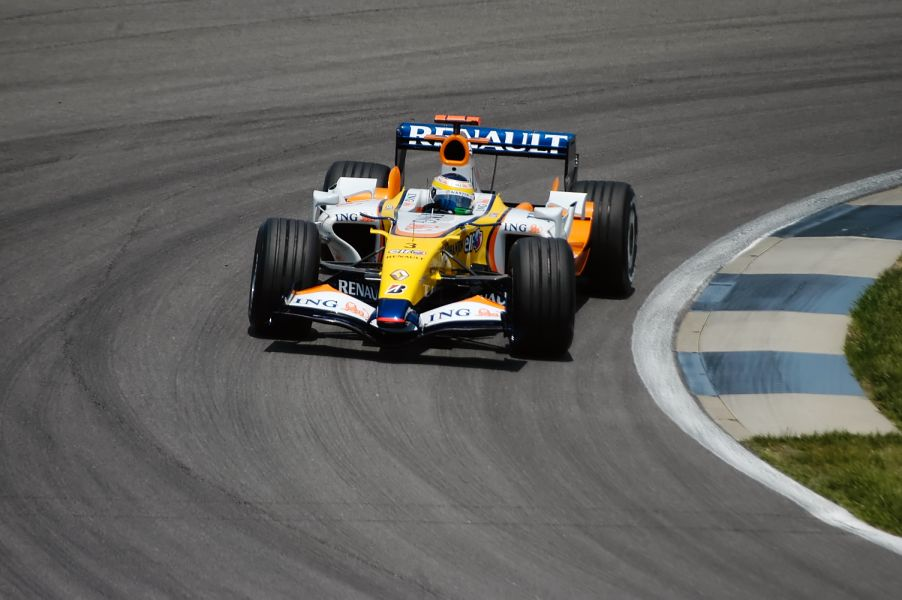
Fisichella driving for Renault at the 2007 United States Grand Prix

In 2007, Fisichella became Renault's lead driver after the departure of Fernando Alonso. His teammate was the team's former test driver, the young Finn Heikki Kovalainen, who was replaced as test driver by Nelson Piquet Jr.

Renault did not demonstrate the same level of pace as in previous seasons, which had seen them win successive World Championships. It remains unclear whether the difference was due to the change of tyre supplier from Michelin to Bridgestone, the driving abilities of Fernando Alonso, or simply being outpaced in off-season development by the other top teams. Another possibility is that the team's wind tunnel was giving inaccurate data in late 2006 which affected the development of the 2007 car. In the early races, Fisichella obtained better results than rookie teammate Kovalainen, but in Canada and the United States, it was the Finn who claimed the higher finishes. Fisichella was disqualified from the Canadian Grand Prix, along with Ferrari's Felipe Massa, for exiting the pit lane while the traffic light was showing red, the purpose of which is to prevent cars rejoining the race ahead of the safety car. He later stated that he had been busy avoiding other cars in the pit lane and had simply not noticed the red light. The Renault team seemed to have made significant progress in terms of pace by the Spanish Grand Prix, but a series of fuel rig problems meant that neither driver was able to capitalise on this apparent increase in performance. Fisichella crashed into the Super Aguri of Anthony Davidson in Hungary which broke his rear suspension and forced him to retire.

=== Force India (2008–2009) ===
==== 2008 ====
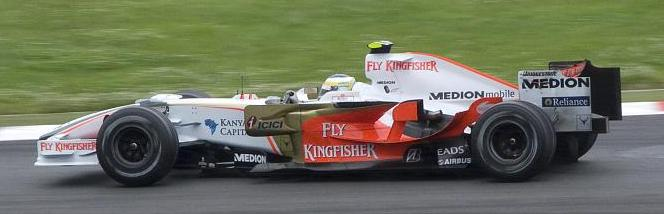
Fisichella driving for Force India at the 2008 French Grand Prix.

With Renault signing Fernando Alonso and Nelson Piquet Jr. Fisichella was announced as the number one driver alongside Adrian Sutil for the Force India F1 team for the 2008 season (This was the third stint for Fisichella at the former Jordan team) on 10 January 2008. In the 2008 Monaco Grand Prix, he became the 9th driver to join the '200' club for drivers to have competed in at least 200 Grands Prix.

Fisichella finished the season pointless, as did the Force India team. However, there were a few moments when he found himself in the points position, such as the Brazil, where an early change to soft compound tyres and his wet-weather ability saw him climb as high as fifth. On 17 October, Force India announced they would keep Fisichella for the 2009 season.

==== 2009 ====
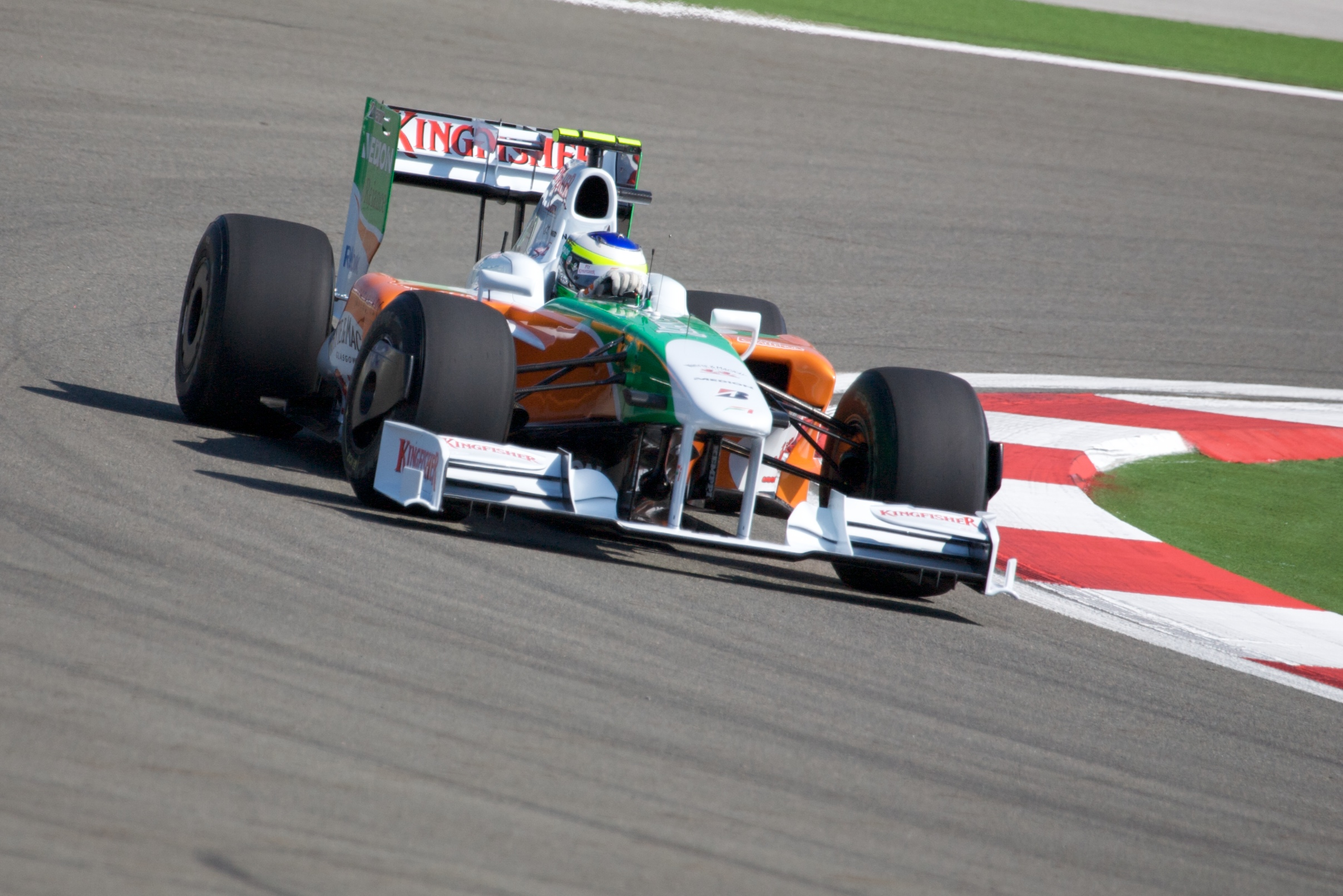
Fisichella driving for Force India at the 2009 Turkish Grand Prix.

With the new Force India VJM02 powered by a Mercedes-Benz engine, Fisichella qualified 18th (promoted to 15th after both Toyotas and Lewis Hamilton were demoted) on the grid for the 2009 curtain-opener at Australia. He finished 11th in the race itself. In Malaysia, he qualified 18th, and was classified in the same position, having spun off in the torrential rain that stopped the race on lap 33.

On 29 August, making the most of some very effective technical upgrades from Force India, Fisichella recorded the team's first pole position at the Belgian Grand Prix. He went on to score Force India's first points and earn them their first podium in Formula One with a strong second-place finish behind Ferrari's Kimi Räikkönen.

During that weekend, there were rumours that Fisichella might replace fellow Italian Luca Badoer (who was himself replacing the injured Felipe Massa) and become a Ferrari driver, something that he admitted he always wanted to do. On 3 September 2009, an official press statement confirmed Fisichella would be released from Force India to drive for Ferrari at the Italian Grand Prix, his home race.

=== Ferrari (2009) ===
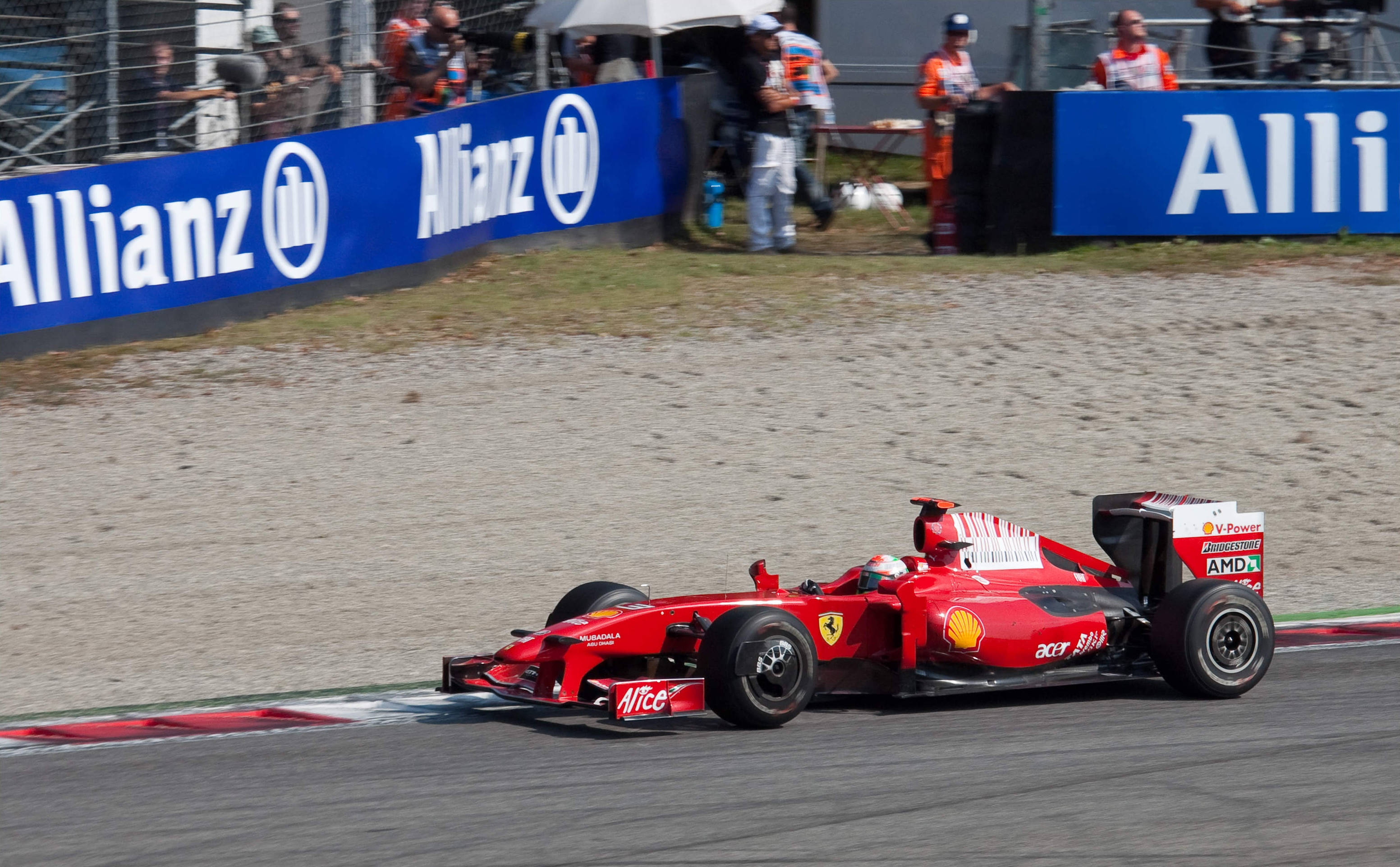
Fisichella driving for Ferrari at the 2009 Italian Grand Prix.

Fisichella signed a contract as Ferrari's driver for the remainder of the 2009 season and reserve driver for 2010 on 3 September 2009. However, he had not ruled out continuing to race for another team in 2010, saying "if there is a good option to find another seat in another team it would be good". Beginning with the 2009 Italian Grand Prix, he replaced the injured Felipe Massa for the remainder of the 2009 season.

Fisichella remained Ferrari's reserve driver for 2010 but had been keen to keep racing for a different team. He admitted that Sauber was a strong option and was strongly linked to the team, however his hopes of driving for Sauber in 2010 were ended when Pedro de la Rosa was confirmed as the team's second driver. He was also linked to a possible return to Force India but the team confirmed former teammate Adrian Sutil and fellow Italian Vitantonio Liuzzi. As a result, he remained one of Ferrari's test drivers for 2010 along with fellow Italian Luca Badoer, Spaniard Marc Gené, Frenchman Jules Bianchi and Italian MotoGP rider Valentino Rossi.

At the end of 2010, Fisichella, along with Luca Badoer and Marc Gené, was replaced by Jules Bianchi as Ferrari test driver ahead of the 2011 season. However he remained a part of the Italian team and attended their annual 'Wroom' media event at Madonna di Campiglio in January 2011.

=== Helmet ===
Fisichella's helmet was white with a yellow stripe running above the visor and dropping to a "v" at the back of the head, and a green stripe below the visor that came to a peak on the back of the head, intersecting the yellow stripe and forming an X on each side of the back of the head, with blue squares replacing the points of intersection; on top there was a blue droplet shape with the point facing backwards to meet the apex of the green line. In 2004, silver and chrome flames were incorporated in the design by Fisichella's then painter, Carsten Meurer of MRC Design. In 2007, Barney Stinton, part of Fisichella's management team incorporated the Italian colours into the design and the helmet was realised by Jens Munser of JMD, a design he uses to this day. Whilst at Renault it featured a light blue ring. Once at Ferrari, his helmet turned black and grey.

In 2004, whilst racing for Sauber, Fisichella became the first driver in Formula 1 to have his HANS device painted in his colours, Massa followed soon after and then the rest of the grid had theirs painted.

== After Formula One ==
=== Sports car racing ===
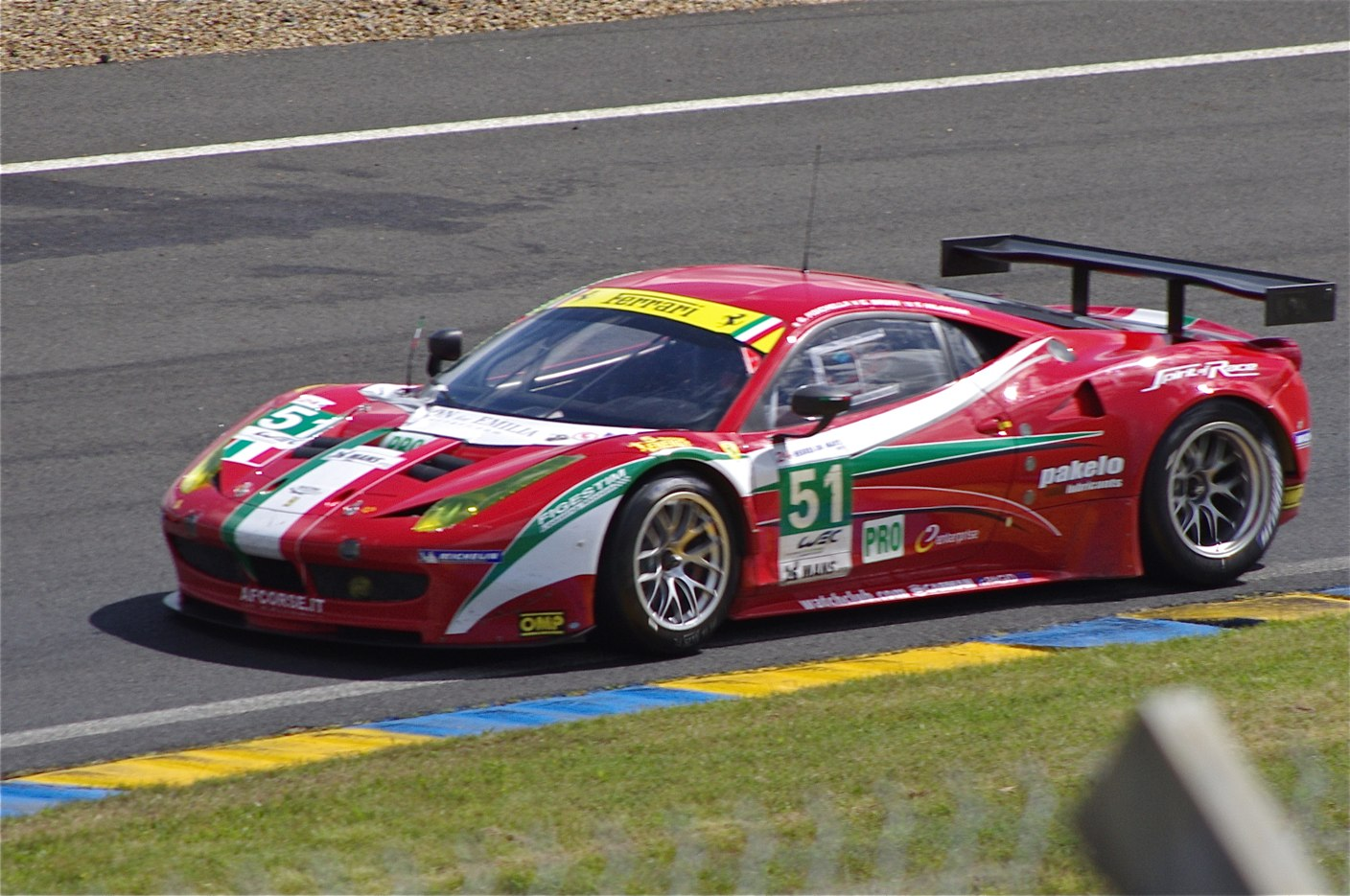
The Ferrari 458 Fisichella drove for AF Corse in the 2012 24 Hours of Le Mans

Fisichella made his sports car racing debut in 2010 by driving for AF Corse in a Ferrari F430 in the Le Mans Series as well as briefly in the American Le Mans Series as part of the Ferrari deal he signed in mid-2009.

In 2011, Fisichella, Gianmaria Bruni and their team AF Corse won both drivers' and teams' championships in the LMGTE Pro class of the Le Mans Series, by finishing second at Le Mans and won the 1000 km of Spa and helped AF Corse win the team's championship in the Intercontinental Le Mans Cup.

In 2012, Fisichella was again with AF Corse and took part in the 2012 World Endurance Championship He won the season opener and came second in Spa.

In the 80th edition of the 24 Hours of Le Mans in 2012, Fisichella and the AF Corse Team scored first place in the GTE-Pro class along with his co-drivers Toni Vilander and Gianmaria Bruni; their Ferrari 458 Italia covered a total of 335 laps (2,845.53 miles), of the Circuit de la Sarthe. Fisichella had the honor of driving the last stage of the competition. After a difficult 2013, Fisichella moved to the TUSCC Series in America to race for Risi Competizione but returned to AF Corse and teammates Bruni and Vilander for the 2014 edition the Le Mans 24hrs. After a hard-fought race, they emerged victorious covering 339 laps, four more than their 2012 win tally. Fisichella then returned to America and won at Road America and Virginia International Raceway, he was then placed 8th in the GT Le Mans standings.

=== Open-wheel racing ===
In 2022, Fisichella competed in one round and three races at the Adelaide 500 in the S5000 category. "I am thrilled to be coming back to Australia to race S5000 – at last," he stated. "My Formula 1 career started literally a few weeks after the last F1 race in Adelaide. I have never driven on the circuit, which is now a slightly shorter version of the GP track. I expect the S5000 car will be fast there, and I'm thrilled to be driving with Team BRM, which has a great record in racing in Australia."

== Other ventures ==
Outside of driving, Fisichella has backed his own GP2 team, FMS International.

== Racing record ==
=== Career summary ===
Season	Series	Team name	Races	Wins	Poles	Points	Position
1992	Italian Formula 3 Championship	Jolly Club	8	1	0	11	8th
1993	Italian Formula 3 Championship	Jolly Club	12	2	0	36	**3rd**
1993	Grand Prix de Monaco F3	Jolly Club	1	0	1	N/A	**2nd**
1993	Macau Grand Prix	RC Motorsport	1	0	0	N/A	NC
1994	Italian Formula 3 Championship	RC Motorsport	20	11	11	309	**1st**
1994	British Formula 3 Championship	RC Motorsport	1	0	0	10	16th
1994	Macau Grand Prix	RC Motorsport	1	0	1	N/A	NC
1994	Grand Prix de Monaco F3	RC Motorsport	1	1	1	N/A	**1st**
1994	Masters of Formula 3	RC Motorsport	1	0	0	N/A	9th
1995	International Touring Car Championship	Alfa Corse 2	10	0	0	37	10th
1995	Deutsche Tourenwagen Meisterschaft	Alfa Corse 2	12	0	0	30	15th
1995	Formula One	Minardi Scuderia Italia	Test driver				
1996	Formula One	Team Minardi	8	0	0	0	19th
1996	International Touring Car Championship	TV Spielfilm Alfa Corse	24	0	0	139	6th
1997	Formula One	Benson & Hedges Jordan Peugeot	17	0	0	20	8th
1997	Belgian Procar Championship	Team Peugeot Belgium	1	1	0	20	12th
1998	Formula One	Mild Seven Benetton Playlife	16	0	1	16	9th
1999	Formula One	Mild Seven Benetton Playlife	16	0	0	13	9th
2000	Formula One	Mild Seven Benetton Playlife	17	0	0	18	6th
2001	Formula One	Mild Seven Benetton Renault	17	0	0	8	11th
2002	Formula One	DHL Jordan Honda	17	0	0	7	11th
2003	Formula One	B&H Jordan Ford	16	1	0	12	12th
2004	Formula One	Sauber Petronas	18	0	0	22	11th
2005	Formula One	Mild Seven Renault F1 Team	19	1	1	58	5th
2006	Formula One	Mild Seven Renault F1 Team	18	1	1	72	4th
2007	Formula One	ING Renault F1 Team	17	0	0	21	8th
2008	Formula One	Force India F1 Team	18	0	0	0	19th
2009	Formula One	Force India F1 Team	12	0	1	8	15th
2009	Formula One	Scuderia Ferrari Marlboro	5	0	0	0	15th
2010	Le Mans Series – GT2	AF Corse	5	0	1	62	**2nd**
2010	24 Hours of Le Mans – GT2	AF Corse	1	0	0	N/A	4th
2010	American Le Mans Series – GT	Risi Competizione	3	0	0	21	26th
2010	Formula One	Scuderia Ferrari	Reserve/Test driver				
2011	Le Mans Series – GTE Pro	AF Corse	5	2	1	60	**1st**
2011	24 Hours of Le Mans – GTE Pro	AF Corse	1	0	0	N/A	**2nd**
2011	American Le Mans Series – GT	AF Corse	2	1	0	0	NC
2012	FIA World Endurance Championship – GTE Pro	AF Corse	8	4	1	161	**1st**
2012	24 Hours of Le Mans – GTE Pro	AF Corse	1	1	0	N/A	**1st**
2012	International Superstars Series	Swiss Team	2	0	0	5	34th
2012	Campionato Italiano Superstars	Swiss Team	2	0	0	5	29th
2012	Formula One	Scuderia Ferrari	Reserve/Test driver				
2013	FIA World Endurance Championship – GTE Pro	AF Corse	8	2	0	135	**2nd**
2013	24 Hours of Le Mans – GTE Pro	AF Corse	1	0	0	N/A	6th
2014	24 Hours of Le Mans – GTE Pro	AF Corse	1	1	1	N/A	**1st**
2014	United SportsCar Championship – GTLM	Risi Competizione	11	2	1	258	13th
2015	24 Hours of Le Mans – GTE Pro	AF Corse	1	0	0	N/A	**3rd**
2015	United SportsCar Championship – GTLM	Risi Competizione	10	0	0	293	4th
2016	24 Hours of Le Mans – GTE Pro	Risi Competizione	1	0	0	N/A	**2nd**
2016	WeatherTech SportsCar Championship – GTLM	Risi Competizione	11	1	0	305	5th
2017	24 Hours of Le Mans – GTE Pro	Risi Competizione	1	0	0	N/A	NC
2017	WeatherTech SportsCar Championship – GTLM	Risi Competizione	7	0	0	199	9th
2017	Blancpain GT Series Endurance Cup – Pro	Kaspersky Motorsport	5	0	1	32	7th
2017	Intercontinental GT Challenge	Kaspersky Motorsport	1	0	1	0	NC
2018	24 Hours of Le Mans – GTE Am	Spirit of Race	1	0	0	N/A	**2nd**
2018	Blancpain GT Series Endurance Cup – Pro Am	961 Corse	1	0	0	8	23rd
2018	Italian GT Championship – GT3	Scuderia Baldini 27	12	4	2	143	4th
2018	Australian GT Championship	Maranello Motorsport	4	0	0	87	34th
2018–19	FIA World Endurance Championship – GTE Am	Spirit of Race	8	0	0	99	4th
2019	24 Hours of Le Mans – GTE Am	Spirit of Race	1	0	0	N/A	13th
2019	Blancpain GT Series Endurance Cup – Pro Am	Tempesta Racing	1	0	0	25	15th
2019	Italian GT Championship – GT3 Pro	Scuderia Baldini 27	3	0	0	0	NC
2019–20	FIA World Endurance Championship – GTE Am	AF Corse	8	0	0	71	12th
2020	24 Hours of Le Mans – GTE Am	AF Corse	1	0	0	N/A	13th
2020	GT World Challenge Europe Endurance Cup – Pro Am	Sky – Tempesta Racing	1	0	0	39	8th
2020	GT World Challenge Europe Sprint Cup – Pro Am	Sky – Tempesta Racing	2	2	1	34	6th
2020	Intercontinental GT Challenge	Sky – Tempesta Racing	1	0	0	0	31st
2021	Asian Le Mans Series – GT	AF Corse	4	0	0	1.5	16th
2021	FIA World Endurance Championship – GTE Am	AF Corse	6	0	0	71	6th
2021	24 Hours of Le Mans – GTE Am	AF Corse	1	0	0	N/A	12th
2021	Italian GT Championship – GT3 Pro	Scuderia Baldini 27					
2022	FIA World Endurance Championship – GTE Am	Iron Lynx	6	0	0	25	19th
2022	GT World Challenge Europe Endurance Cup	Iron Lynx	1	0	0	0	NC
2022	24 Hours of Le Mans – GTE Am	Iron Lynx	1	0	0	N/A	13th
2022	Italian GT Championship – GT3	Scuderia Baldini 27					
2022	S5000 Tasman Series	Team BRM	3	0	0	52	12th
2023	Italian GT Endurance Championship – GT3	Scuderia Baldini	4	4	3	55	**1st**
2024	Italian GT Endurance Championship – GT3	Scuderia Baldini	4	2	3	79	**1st**
2025	GT World Challenge Asia	LM corsa	4	0	0	6*	24th*
2026	Italian GT Championship Sprint Cup - GT Cup	Double TT Racing					

=== Complete Deutsche Tourenwagen Meisterschaft results ===
Year	Team	Car	1	2	3	4	5	6	7	8	9	10	11	12	13	14	Pos.	Pts
1995	Alfa Corse 2	Alfa Romeo 155 V6 Ti	HOC; 1; 6	HOC; 2 Ret	AVU; 1; 4	AVU; 2; 19	NOR; 1 DNS	NOR; 2 DNS	DIE; 1; 6	DIE; 2 Ret	NÜR; 1; 6	NÜR; 2 Ret	ALE; 1; 15	ALE; 2 Ret	HOC; 1; 10	HOC; 1; 10	15th	30

=== Complete International Touring Car Championship ===
Year	Team	Car	1	2	3	4	5	6	7	8	9	10	11	12	13	14	15	16	17	18	19	20	21	22	23	24	25	26	Pos.	Pts
1995	Alfa Corse 2	Alfa Romeo 155 V6 Ti	MUG; 1; 7	MUG; 2; 2	HEL; 1; 16^{†}	HEL; 2 Ret	DON; 1; 5	DON; 2 Ret	EST; 1; 4	EST; 2; 14	MAG; 1 Ret	MAG; 2 Ret																	10th	37
1996	TV Spielfilm Alfa Corse	Alfa Romeo 155 V6 Ti	HOC; 1; 7	HOC; 2; 10	NÜR; 1 EX	NÜR; 2 EX	EST; 1; 2	EST; 2; 5	HEL; 1; 12	HEL; 2; 5	NOR; 1; 11	NOR; 2 Ret	DIE; 1; 3	DIE; 2 Ret	SIL; 1 Ret	SIL; 2; 9	NÜR; 1; 5	NÜR; 2; 4	MAG; 1; 3	MAG; 2; 2	MUG; 1; 3	MUG; 2; 13	HOC; 1; 12	HOC; 2; 5	INT; 1; 12	INT; 2; 16	SUZ; 1; 4	SUZ; 2; 2	6th	139

^{†} Driver did not finish the race, but was classified as he completed over 90% of the race distance.

=== Complete Formula One results ===
(key) (Races in bold indicate pole position) (Races in italics indicate fastest lap)

Year	Entrant	Chassis	Engine	1	2	3	4	5	6	7	8	9	10	11	12	13	14	15	16	17	18	19	WDC	Points
1996	Team Minardi	Minardi M195B	Ford EDM2 3.0 V8 Ford EDM3 3.0 V8	AUS; Ret	BRA	ARG	EUR; 13	SMR; Ret	MON; Ret	ESP; Ret	CAN; 8	FRA; Ret	GBR; 11	GER	HUN	BEL	ITA	POR	JPN				19th	0
1997	Benson & Hedges Total Jordan Peugeot	Jordan 197	Peugeot A14 3.0 V10	AUS; Ret	BRA; 8	ARG; Ret	SMR; 4	MON; 6	ESP; 9	CAN; 3	FRA; 9	GBR; 7	GER; 11^{†}	HUN; Ret	BEL; 2	ITA; 4	AUT; 4	LUX; Ret	JPN; 7	EUR; 11			8th	20
1998	Mild Seven Benetton Playlife	Benetton B198	Playlife GC37-01 3.0 V10	AUS; Ret	BRA; 6	ARG; 7	SMR; Ret	ESP; Ret	MON; 2	CAN; 2	FRA; 9	GBR; 5	**AUT**; Ret	GER; 7	HUN; 8	BEL; Ret	ITA; 8	LUX; 6	JPN; 8				9th	16
1999	Mild Seven Benetton Playlife	Benetton B199	Playlife FB01 3.0 V10	AUS; 4	BRA; Ret	SMR; 5	MON; 5	ESP; 9	CAN; 2	FRA; Ret	GBR; 7	AUT; 12^{†}	GER; Ret	HUN; Ret	BEL; 11	ITA; Ret	EUR; Ret	MAL; 11	JPN; 14^{†}				9th	13
2000	Mild Seven Benetton Playlife	Benetton B200	Playlife FB02 3.0 V10	AUS; 5	BRA; 2	SMR; 11	GBR; 7	ESP; 9	EUR; 5	MON; 3	CAN; 3	FRA; 9	AUT; Ret	GER; Ret	HUN; Ret	BEL; Ret	ITA; 11	USA; Ret	JPN; 14	MAL; 9			6th	18
2001	Mild Seven Benetton Renault	Benetton B201	Renault RS21 3.0 V10	AUS; 13	MAL; Ret	BRA; 6	SMR; Ret	ESP; 14	AUT; Ret	MON; Ret	CAN; Ret	EUR; 11	FRA; 11	GBR; 13	GER; 4	HUN; Ret	BEL; 3	ITA; 10	USA; 8	JPN; 17^{†}			11th	8
2002	DHL Jordan Honda	Jordan EJ12	Honda RA002E 3.0 V10	AUS; Ret	MAL; 13	BRA; Ret	SMR; Ret	ESP; Ret	AUT; 5	MON; 5	CAN; 5	EUR; Ret	GBR; 7	FRA; DNQ	GER; Ret	HUN; 6	BEL; Ret	ITA; 8	USA; 7	JPN; Ret			11th	7
2003	B&H Jordan Ford	Jordan EJ13	Ford RS1 3.0 V10	AUS; 12^{†}	MAL; Ret	BRA; 1	SMR; 15^{†}	ESP; Ret	AUT; Ret	MON; 10	CAN; Ret	EUR; 12	FRA; Ret	GBR; Ret	GER; 13^{†}	HUN; Ret	ITA; 10	USA; 7	JPN; Ret				12th	12
2004	Red Bull Sauber Petronas	Sauber C23	Petronas 04A 3.0 V10	AUS; 10	MAL; 11	BHR; 11	SMR; 9	ESP; 7	MON; Ret	EUR; 6	CAN; 4	USA; 9^{†}	FRA; 12	GBR; 6	GER; 9	HUN; 8	BEL; 5	ITA; 8	CHN; 7	JPN; 8	BRA; 9		11th	22
2005	Mild Seven Renault F1 Team	Renault R25	Renault RS25 3.0 V10	**AUS**; 1	MAL; Ret	BHR; Ret	SMR; Ret	ESP; 5	MON; 12	EUR; 6	CAN; Ret	USA; DNS	FRA; 6	GBR; 4	GER; 4	HUN; 9	TUR; 4	ITA; 3	BEL; Ret	BRA; 5	JPN; 2	CHN; 4	5th	58
2006	Mild Seven Renault F1 Team	Renault R26	Renault RS26 2.4 V8	BHR; Ret	**MAL**; 1	AUS; 5	SMR; 8	EUR; 6	ESP; 3	MON; 6	GBR; 4	CAN; 4	USA; 3	FRA; 6	GER; 6	HUN; Ret	TUR; 6	ITA; 4	CHN; 3	JPN; 3	BRA; 6		4th	72
2007	ING Renault F1 Team	Renault R27	Renault RS27 2.4 V8	AUS; 5	MAL; 6	BHR; 8	ESP; 9	MON; 4	CAN; DSQ	USA; 9	FRA; 6	GBR; 8	EUR; 10	HUN; 12	TUR; 9	ITA; 12	BEL; Ret	JPN; 5	CHN; 11	BRA; Ret			8th	21
2008	Force India F1 Team	Force India VJM01	Ferrari 056 2.4 V8	AUS; Ret	MAL; 12	BHR; 12	ESP; 10	TUR; Ret	MON; Ret	CAN; Ret	FRA; 18	GBR; Ret	GER; 16	HUN; 15	EUR; 14	BEL; 17	ITA; Ret	SIN; 14	JPN; Ret	CHN; 17	BRA; 18		19th	0
2009	Force India F1 Team	Force India VJM02	Mercedes-Benz FO108W 2.4 V8	AUS; 11	MAL; 18^{†}	CHN; 14	BHR; 15	ESP; 14	MON; 9	TUR; Ret	GBR; 10	GER; 11	HUN; 14	EUR; 12	**BEL**; 2								15th	8
2009	Scuderia Ferrari Marlboro	Ferrari F60	Ferrari 056 2.4 V8													ITA; 9	SIN; 13	JPN; 12	BRA; 10	ABU; 16			15th	8

^{†} Driver did not finish the race, but was classified as he completed over 90% of the race distance.

=== Complete 24 Hours of Le Mans results ===
Year	Team	Co-Drivers	Car	Class	Laps	Pos.	Class Pos.
2010	(Italy) AF Corse	(France) Jean Alesi (Finland) Toni Vilander	Ferrari F430 GT2	GT2	323	16th	4th
2011	(Italy) AF Corse	(Italy) Gianmaria Bruni (Finland) Toni Vilander	Ferrari 458 Italia GT2	GTE; Pro	314	13th	**2nd**
2012	(Italy) AF Corse	(Italy) Gianmaria Bruni (Finland) Toni Vilander	Ferrari 458 Italia GT2	GTE; Pro	335	17th	**1st**
2013	(Italy) AF Corse	(Italy) Gianmaria Bruni (Italy) Matteo Malucelli	Ferrari 458 Italia GT2	GTE; Pro	311	21st	6th
2014	(Italy) AF Corse	(Italy) Gianmaria Bruni (Finland) Toni Vilander	Ferrari 458 Italia GT2	GTE; Pro	339	13th	**1st**
2015	(Italy) AF Corse	(Italy) Gianmaria Bruni (Finland) Toni Vilander	Ferrari 458 Italia GT2	GTE; Pro	330	25th	**3rd**
2016	(United States) Risi Competizione	(Italy) Matteo Malucelli (Finland) Toni Vilander	Ferrari 488 GTE	GTE; Pro	340	20th	**2nd**
2017	(United States) Risi Competizione	(Finland) Toni Vilander (Germany) Pierre Kaffer	Ferrari 488 GTE	GTE; Pro	72	DNF	DNF
2018	(Switzerland) Spirit of Race	(Italy) Francesco Castellacci (Switzerland) Thomas Flohr	Ferrari 488 GTE	GTE; Am	335	26th	**2nd**
2019	(Switzerland) Spirit of Race	(Italy) Francesco Castellacci (Switzerland) Thomas Flohr	Ferrari 488 GTE	GTE; Am	327	43rd	12th
2020	(Italy) AF Corse	(Italy) Francesco Castellacci (Switzerland) Thomas Flohr	Ferrari 488 GTE Evo	GTE; Am	330	39th	13th
2021	(Italy) AF Corse	(Italy) Francesco Castellacci (Switzerland) Thomas Flohr	Ferrari 488 GTE Evo	GTE; Am	329	39th	11th
2022	(Italy) Iron Lynx	(Italy) Matteo Cressoni (United States) Richard Heistand	Ferrari 488 GTE Evo	GTE; Am	336	46th	13th

=== 24 Hours of Daytona results ===
Year	Result	Team	Car	Class
2014	DNF	Risi Competizione	Ferrari 458 Italia GTC	GTLM
2015	DNF	Risi Competizione	Ferrari 458 Italia GTC	GTLM
2016	6	Risi Competizione	Ferrari 488 GTE	GTLM
2017	3	Risi Competizione	Ferrari 488 GTE	GTLM

=== 12 Hours of Sebring results ===
Year	Result	Team	Car	Class
2011	5	AF Corse	Ferrari F430 GT2	GT / GTE-PRO
2012	DSQ	AF Corse	Ferrari 458 Italia GTC	GT / GTE-PRO
2014	DNF	Risi Competizione	Ferrari 458 Italia GTC	GTLM
2015	2	Risi Competizione	Ferrari 458 Italia GTC	GTLM
2016	4	Risi Competizione	Ferrari 488 GTE	GTLM
2017	3	Risi Competizione	Ferrari 488 GTE	GTLM

=== 10 Hours / 1000 miles of Petit Le Mans results ===
Year	Result	Team	Car	Class
2010	7	Risi Competizione	Ferrari F430 GT2	GT2
2011	1	AF Corse	Ferrari 458 Italia GTC	GT / GTE-PRO
2014	DNF	Risi Competizione	Ferrari 458 Italia GTC	GTLM
2015	5	Risi Competizione	Ferrari 458 Italia GTC	GTLM
2016	1	Risi Competizione	Ferrari 488 GTE	GTLM
2017	3	Risi Competizione	Ferrari 488 GTE	GTLM

=== Complete International Superstars Series results ===
(key) (Races in bold indicate pole position) (Races in italics indicate fastest lap)

Year	Team	Car	1	2	3	4	5	6	7	8	9	10	11	12	13	14	15	16	DC	Points
2012	Swiss Team	Maserati Quattroporte	MNZ; 1	MNZ; 2	IMO; 1	IMO; 2	DON; 1	DON; 2	MUG; 1	MUG; 2	HUN; 1	HUN; 2	SPA; 1	SPA; 2	VAL; 1; 8	VAL; 2; 11	PER; 1	PER; 2	34th	5

=== Complete FIA World Endurance Championship results ===
(key) (Races in bold indicate pole position; races in italics indicate fastest lap)

Year	Entrant	Class	Car	Engine	1	2	3	4	5	6	7	8	Rank	Points
2012	AF Corse	LMGTE Pro	Ferrari 458 Italia GT2	Ferrari F142 4.5L V8	SEB; EX	SPA; 2	LMS; 1	SIL; 1	SÃO; 1	BHR; 1	FUJ; 2	SHA; Ret	52nd	3.5
2013	AF Corse	LMGTE Pro	Ferrari 458 Italia GT2	Ferrari F142 4.5L V8	SIL; 5	SPA; 1	LMS; 5	SÃO; 1	COA; 2	FUJ; 2	SHA; 4	BHR; 3	**2nd**	**135**
2014	AF Corse	LMGTE Pro	Ferrari 458 Italia GT2	Ferrari 4.5 L V8	SIL	SPA	**LMS**; 1	COA	FUJ	SHA	BHR	SÃO	14th	51
2015	AF Corse	LMGTE Pro	Ferrari 458 Italia GT2	Ferrari 4.5 L V8	SIL	SPA	LMS; 4	NÜR	COA	FUJ	SHA	BHR	20th	24
2018–19	Spirit of Race	LMGTE Am	Ferrari 488 GTE	Ferrari F154CB 3.9 L Turbo V8	SPA; 8	LMS; 2	SIL; 9	FUJ; 6	SHA; 4	SEB; 2	SPA; 4	LMS; 7	4th	99
2019–20	AF Corse	LMGTE Am	Ferrari 488 GTE Evo	Ferrari F154CB 3.9 L Turbo V8	SIL; 9	FUJ; 6	SHA; 8	BHR; 5	COA; 7	SPA; 7	LMS; 7	BHR; 4	12th	71
2021	AF Corse	LMGTE Am	Ferrari 488 GTE Evo	Ferrari F154CB 3.9 L Turbo V8	SPA; 4	ALG; 3	MNZ; 7	LMS; 7	BHR; 7	BHR; 6			6th	71
2022	Iron Lynx	LMGTE Am	Ferrari 488 GTE Evo	Ferrari F154CB 3.9 L Turbo V8	SEB; 8	SPA; 8	LMS	MNZ; 4	FUJ; 11	BHR; 9			19th	25

=== Complete IMSA SportsCar Championship results ===
(key) (Races in bold indicate pole position; results in italics indicate fastest lap)

Year	Team	Class	Make	Engine	1	2	3	4	5	6	7	8	9	10	11	Pos.	Points	Ref
2014	Risi Competizione	GTLM	Ferrari 458 Italia GT2	Ferrari 4.5L V8	DAY; 11	SEB; 11	**LBH**; 9	LGA; 3	WGL; 7	MOS; 10	IMS; 2	ELK; 1	VIR; 1	COA; 4	PET; 11	13th	258	
2015	Risi Competizione	GTLM	Ferrari 458 Italia GT2	Ferrari 4.5L V8	DAY; 9	SEB; 2	LBH; 2	LGA; 4	**WGL**; 5	MOS; 6	ELK; 3	VIR; 3	COA; 2	PET; 5		4th	293	
2016	Risi Competizione	GTLM	Ferrari 488 GTE	Ferrari F154CB 3.9 L Turbo V8	DAY; 6	SEB; 4	LBH; 3	LGA; 5	WGL; 6	MOS; 7	LIM; 4	ELK; 5	VIR; 7	COA; 8	PET; 1	5th	305	
2017	Risi Competizione	GTLM	Ferrari 488 GTE	Ferrari F154CB 3.9 L Turbo V8	DAY; 3	SEB; 3	LBH; 9	COA; 9	WGL	MOS	LIM	ELK	VIR; 3	**LGA**; 2	**PET**; 3	9th	199	

=== Complete S5000 results ===
Year	Series	Team	1	2	3	4	5	6	7	8	9	10	11	12	Position	Points
2020	Australian	Borland Racing Developments	APC; R1; PO	APC; R2; PO	SMP; R3; C	SMP; R4; C	WIN; R5; C	WIN; R6; C	BMP; R7; C	BMP; R8; C	PHI; R9; C	PHI; R10; C	SAN; R11; C	SAN; R12; C	NC	–
2022	Tasman	Team BRM	SUR; R1	SUR; R2	SUR; R3	ADL; R4; 4	ADL; R5; Ret	ADL; R6; 6							12th	52

=== Complete Italian GT Championship results ===
Year	Team	Car	1	2	3	4	5	6	7	8	DC	Pts
2024	Scuderia Baldini	Ferrari 296 GT3	VAL; 1	**VAL**; 1	MUG; 11	**MUG**; 7	IMO; 4	IMO; 4	MON; 1	**MON**; 1	1st	79

=== Complete GT World Challenge Asia results ===
Year	Team	Car	Class	1	2	3	4	5	6	7	8	9	10	11	12	DC	Pts
2025	LM Corsa	Ferrari 296 GT3	Pro-Am	SEP	SEP	MAN; 20	MAN; 7	CHA; 23	CHA; 26	FUJ	FUJ	OKA	OKA	BEI	BEI	22nd*	6*

== Personal life ==
Fisichella is related to the Fisichella Family, forming part of the Sicilian nobility.

Fisichella married Luna Castellani on 10 October 2009. They have three children: Carlotta, Christopher and Carolina.

Fisichella is a supporter of Italian Serie A side Roma, and captain of the official Nazionale Piloti association football team.

Fisichella has a cameo appearance in the 2019 film The Art of Racing in the Rain, playing a Scuderia Ferrari crew member in the closing scenes.

== See also ==
- Fisichella family
- Fisichella (surname)

Sporting positions
Preceded by Gianantonio Pacchioni	Monaco Formula Three; Race Winner; 1994	Succeeded by Gianantonio Pacchioni
Preceded by Christian Pescatori	Italian Formula Three Champion; 1994	Succeeded by Luca Rangoni
Preceded by Luca Badoer	Formula One Indoor Trophy; Winner; 1996	Succeeded by None (Event ended)
Preceded by Marc Lieb; Richard Lietz (GT2)	Le Mans Series; LMGTE Pro Champion; 2011; With: Gianmaria Bruni	Succeeded by Jonny Cocker
Awards and achievements
Preceded by Luca di Montezemolo	Lorenzo Bandini Trophy; 1998	Succeeded by Alexander Wurz
