= Salvatore Fisichella =

Italian operatic tenor (born 1943)

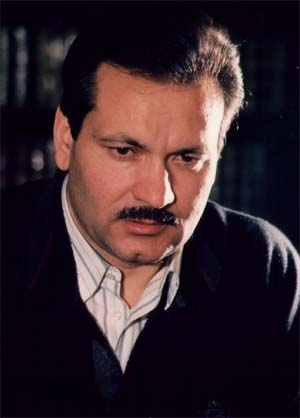
Salvatore Fisichella

Salvatore Fisichella (born 15 May 1943 in Catania, Sicily) is an Italian operatic tenor known for his roles in bel canto operas, especially those of Rossini, Donizetti and Bellini. He has been recognized for the ease and vocal brilliance of his singing, and for having sung more of the leading roles in Bellini's operas than any other 20th century tenor.

== Early years ==
Fisichella began singing as a child at family get-togethers. He was interested in church music by the age of ten, and was schooled in music at the local seminary. He sang solos in church services and during small-scale musical productions for special occasions and festivals. After leaving the seminary, Fisichella began secondary education, first at the liceo scientifico, then moving to study as a surveyor. After he had successfully completed his secondary studies as a qualified surveyor, Fisichella was invited to the wedding of a client for whom he had drawn up the plans of his new home, and Fisichella filled in for the tenor who had been scheduled to perform.

He studied for six years with renowned Catanese soprano Maria Gentile. During this time he listened to Mario del Monaco, Giuseppe Di Stefano, Franco Corelli, Carlo Bergonzi and Gianni Raimondi and began performing in small concerts. After studying with Maria Gentile, Fisichella studied further in Rome with Ricci and Paoletti.

== Operatic career ==
=== 1970s ===
Fisichella won the XXIV Concorso Lirico Adriano Belli - the prestigious competition held in Spoleto, for his performances of the opera pieces I puritani, La favorite and Rigoletto. Prior to touring all of Italy, Spoleto was also the venue for Fisichella's debut performance in the leading role of Massenet's Werther conducted by Ottavio Ziino.

In 1971 Fisichella was engaged by the Teatro dell'Opera di Roma for two performances of Rigoletto and no less than seven performances of I puritani conducted by Armando La Rosa Parodi with Mirella Freni and Cornell MacNeil. In the same year, he also performed at the Teatro Massimo in Palermo alongside Leyla Gencer in Elisabetta, regina d'Inghilterra conducted by Gianandrea Gavazzeni. A year later, he was called upon again by the Opera di Roma, this time to work with Mirella Freni and Ghiaurov in Gounoud's Faust conducted by Georges Prêtre. In April 1973 he debuted at the Teatro Massimo Bellini in Catania, working with Lidia Marimpietri in a production of La bohème conducted by Zoltan Pesko.

In 1973, Fisichella took part in Elisa e Claudio at the Festival Mercadantiano in Altamura. In Pesaro in 1975, he sang in Rossini's Messa di Gloria, a score avoided by many of the bel canto elite.

=== 1980s ===
In 1983, he performed in a production of La bohème with Katia Ricciarelli. In 1984, he sang with Bruna Baglioni, Giorgio Zancanaro and Bonaldo Giaiotti at the State Theatre of Bern in Donizetti's La favorite conducted by Nello Santi. On this occasion, the critic of Der Bund described Fisichella as "currently the best tenor singer of the Donizetti and Bellini repertoire". It was around this time that Fisichella began to collaborate with Nello Santi, the maestro who would encourage the tenor to take up the challenging roles of I puritani, La Gioconda, Guglielmo Tell, La nuit de mai, Rigoletto, Il pirata, and the Messa di Requiem. In the same year, Fisichella performed Rossini's Stabat Mater at the Konzerthaus in Vienna. In 1985, he once again played Arturo in I puritani (this time singing alongside the soprano Edita Gruberova and baritone Giorgio Zancanaro, with the conductor Masini at the Bregenz Festival. Dortmund also saw him play Arturo. Again in 1985, Fisichella performed for the Radio Berlin concert to commemorate the 150th anniversary of Vincenzo Bellini's death.

In November 1986, Fisichella performed the role of Arturo in I puritani at his Metropolitan Opera debut in New York, together with the soprano Joan Sutherland. The performance created a stir among the New York press.

=== 1990s ===
Fisichella's vocal range, flexibility and incisive phrasing have led the singer to branch out beyond the bel canto repertoire into verismo, as, for example, in his 1988 performance of La Gioconda at the inauguration of the Teatro Regio di Torino. He performed the role of Mario Cavaradossi in Tosca at the XXXVI Puccini Festival in the summer of 1990.

Fisichella was one of the performers at the Megaconcert held in Verona Arena (Concert of Tenors) to commemorate the centenary of Beniamino Gigli's birth, (Corriere della Sera 29/8/1990). He was seen playing the role of Edgardo in Lucia di Lammermoor at La Scala in Milan in May 1992.

In 1995, Fisichella performed in the production of Donizetti's La favorite broadcast live on Italian National Radio. He performed together with Leo Nucci in Rigoletto at the Zurich Opera House, as conducted by Nello Santi. The production was later taken to the Gran Teatre del Liceu in Barcelona. Together with Katia Ricciarelli, Fisichella was invited to the closing concert of the Homage to Pietro Mascagni celebrations organised in Vizzini to commemorate the 50th anniversary of Mascagni's death. The concert took place against the natural backdrop to Cavalleria Rusticana.

He performed Verdi's Requiem in Solingen with The MGV Wupperhorf Choir 1812, of which he is an honorary member. On this occasion, Fisichella performed together with Rybarska, Baglioni, and Nesterenko and the concert was recorded on CD.

In 1996, Fisichella returned to Tokyo for a production of La traviata with June Anderson. The same year saw him perform in Mario Monicelli's centenary production of La bohème at the 42nd Puccini Festival in Torre del Lago.

Fisichella performed three concerts of Verdi's Requiem conducted by Nello Santi at the Teatro Filarmonico in Verona and the Teatro Sociale in Mantua. In 1997 he returned to the Zurich Opernhaus to perform Rigoletto, alternating with Nucci and Zancanaro.

On the occasion of the inaugural concerts for the newly restored Teatro Massimo in Palermo, he performed together with Gasdia, Casolla, and Peterson in Beethoven's Ninth Symphony conducted by Neschling. He sang again with Nucci in La traviata and the Requiem Mass at the III Festival d’Opera d’Avence. At the VII Classical Open Air Festival in Solothurn, he performed with Nucci both in La bohème and Rigoletto. Another engagement followed at Verona's Teatro Filarmonico where he sang the challenging piece by Verdi - Inno delle nazioni, conducted by Maurizio Arena.

At the Cathedral of Catania he performed Geremia's unpublished Missa Pro Defunctis 1809 and Bellini's Messa Seconda in G minor with Katia Ricciarelli. The concert was conducted by Douglas Bostock, and was recorded for Classico records. In 1998, Fisichella was again to sing with Katia Ricciarelli, this time performing in three large-scale New Year's concerts organised by the Sicilian Regional Authorities. He also performed in Teatro Massimo Bellini's production of Rigoletto in Catania (with Nucci and Pace, conducted by Nello Santi) and in the Concerto Dei Grandi Tenori Siciliani organised by the same theatre. This was the period in which Fisichella was presented with the Gigli D’Oro award at the second Una vita per la Musica event held in Recanati, the native town of the tenor himself. In 1999, Fisichella was once again invited to perform at the Puccini Festival in a production of La bohème. The same year saw Fisichella, together with two fellow performers, in a memorable open air Concerto Sotto Le Stelle in Recanati, singing in the same square where Gigli had so often entertained his home public.

=== 2000s ===
In Johnstown (Pittsburgh, U.S.A.), Fisichella received a welcome in the awaited annual concerto-festival at the Pasquarilla Center. 2000 continued with performances of Macbeth at the Teatro Massimo in Catania, Madame Butterfly at the Puccini Festival, and a production of La bohème at the Den Norske Opera in Oslo.

Fisichella opened the new millennium with two concerts in Beijing, one on New Year's Eve, the other on New Year's Day. On this occasion, he had the honour of being the only European singer invited to perform with the three largest choirs and orchestras of China. During the Anno Belliano celebrations, he was a contributor together with Lucia Aliberti and Roberto Frontali in Teatro Massimo Bellini's production of Il pirata in Catania.

Between 2001 and 2005, the tenor performed various operas, concerts & recitals around Europe. In 2001, he performed Rigoletto in both the Opera Gala at the Stadttheater, St. Gallen, and also at the Festival of Openair Solothurn. In October, the tenor went on to give four performances of Tosca in Ooppera in Helsinki and sang Capuleti ei Montecchi at the Den Norske Opera in Oslo. In November, he gave two performances of I puritani in a Bellinianino Concert at the Grand Theatre, Łódź, La bohème and Madama Butterfly at the Hungarian State Opera House's Puccini Festival together with Ilona Tokody and Tamas Busa.

In 2002, Fisichella taught at the 5th International Vocal Masterslass held in Akademia Muzyczna in Gdańsk. He also gave several performances in the Galakonzert at the Baltic Opera Theater and the Festival of Openair Solothurn, in the months of May and July respectively. Also in 2002, he staged a concert at the Opera in Minsk.

He was once again in the Openair Solothurn in July 2003 playing Rigoletto and Faust. In August, he participated in the Concert Vocale held in the Noto Music Festival; in this year he was also awarded with Beniamino Gigli Prize. In the months of March, April and May 2004, he was contracted to play as Pollione in Norma, together with Gabriella Morigi, Riikka Rantanen, Serena Farnocchia, Ilkka Vihavainen and Hannu Forsberg. This was directed by the soprano Renata Scotto and conducted by Alberto Hold-Garrido. In September, he staged a Lirico Concert together with the soprano Chiara Taigi in Berne Theatre.

In July 2005, he was seen playing Faust, together with Svetozar Rangelov and Tsvetana Bandalovska at the Openair Solothurn, with Nayden Todorov as conductor. Also in July, Fisichella rendered a Concert Lirico, conducted by Giorgio Croci at the National Opera and Ballet (Sofia).

== Accolades, awards and distinctions ==
- 1970 – XXIV Teatro Lirico Sperimentale di Spoleto "Adriano Belli"
- 21 August 1977 – "Polifemo D'Argento", Pride of Sicily award
- 1984 – "Manifestazcione Pucciniane", Puccini festival
- 27 August 1986 – "Orfeo Musicale"
- 10 December 1989 – "Membro Onorario MGV Wuppehuf Choir 1812", Solingen. (Honorary membership of MGV Wupperhof Choir 1812)
- 5 September 1990 – "Chiostro D'Argento"
- 26 September 1990 – "Premio Mafalda Favero 1990"
- 3 January 1991 – "Targa Bel Canto" Biancavilla (Catania) Bel Canto Shield
- 13 July 1991 – "Premio Internazionale Vincenzo Bellini" Vincenzo Bellini International Prize
- 16 October 1994 – "XV Bellini D’Oro 1994", awarded by the Sicilian Tourist Authority at the Teatro Massimo Bellini in Catania with the following commentary:
  Salvatore Fisichella continues in the great singing tradition of the provinces around Etna. Gifted with extraordinary ease of voice and vocal brilliance, especially in the top range and extreme top range as demanded by Bellini's scores, he is worthy of full honours as being the only tenor of this century to have played and sung the major opera roles of the cigno catanese Bellini.
- 17 December 1994 – "VIII Premio Internazionale Giacomo Lauri Volpi" International Prize
- 18 August 1996 – "XVI Premio Castagno Di Cento Cavalli"
- 24 November 1996 – "Premio Nuraghe D’oro Alla Carriera", Cagliari
- 21 December 1996 –"Cavaliere Della Repubblica Italiana" for Artistic Merit
- 1 November 1998 – "Gigli D’Oro" 2nd edition, Una vita per la musica, Recanati (A lifetime of Music Prize) with the following commentary:
  Admirable descendant of a plethora of great voices, Fisichella's refined singing and generous sensitivity play their part in the worldwide repute of Italian bel canto.
- 25 October 1999 – "Premio Internazionale Di Siciliana, Pigna D’Argento" with the following commentary:
  The voice of the Catanese singer Salvatore Fisichella is without doubt one of the most interesting among post-war opera singers. With particular expertise in 19th century repertoire he has played the highest number of tenor roles inspired by the genius - his great compatriot Vincenzo Bellini. With top notes that are both clear and bright and a solid mid range, Fisichella holds the standard of bel canto singing high, performing scores that are often little heard due to their demanding nature. Continuing in the splendid tradition of the great Sicilian opera singers before him with performances in all the major theatres of the world, he has already numerous international awards to his name. Almost thirty years since his debut, Fisichella continues to maintain an enviable vocal freshness thanks to skillful technique and intelligent career choices.
- 30 October 1999 – "Cavaliere Del Supremo Ordine Di Malta OSY – USA OF KRAC"
- 19 June 2001 – "Premio Internazionale Sicilia Il Paladino" with the following commentary:
  For exceptional merit in opera and for raising the international prestige of the bel canto tradition.
- 7 April 2003 – "Beniamino Gigli Muistokonsertti Prize" awarded by Finnish National Opera, Helsinki.

== Voice ==
Fisichella has a full lyric tenor voice. Following a brief outline of Fisichella's career, the Dictionary of Opera by Harold Rosenthal and John Warrack, concludes that Fisichella's is "...a voice that has remained intact after 25 years of singing, quite simply the most lovely tone of the Italian tenors of our day."

== Discography ==
- Rossini: Otello - Philips 6769081. For details, see here
- Rossini: Mose en Egitto – Philips 6769023
- Sternstunden der Musik – Aul 30522/23 S. F.
- Jussi Björling Memorial Concert – Swedish Society Discofil SLT 33275/6
- Salvatore Fisichella Volume 1 – Felmain Records FM 14
- Salvatore Fisichella Volume 2 – Felmain Records FM 14
- Die Wuperhorfer Salvatore Fisichella – Liederabend Operagala
- I Grandi Interpretti della Lirica – Salavatore Fisichella – Felmain Records
- Weihnachtliches Konzert die Wupperhofer
- La nuit de mai
- Verdi: Messa di Requiem
- Bellini: Messa nº 2, Geremia: Missa Pro Defunctis
- Bellini: I puritani – Serenissima
- Tenor Arias Volume 1
- Concert of Tenors – Arena di Verona 1990 (in celebration of the 100th anniversary of Beniamino Gigli's birth)
- Mose – Preghiera – Philips CD
- Le Voci dell’Etna – Tima Club 74

=== Radio productions ===
- Werther (Massenet) – 1970 (RAI, Spoleto)
- Operatic Concert – 1971 (RAI, Milan)
- Concert – 18th century opera – 1972 (RAI, Naples)
- The Two Widows (Smetana) – 1974 (RAI, Milan)
- Messa di Gloria (Rossini) – 1976 (RSI, Lugano)
- Messa di Gloria (Rossini) – 1982 (RSI, Lugano)
- Stabat Mater (Rossini) – 1984 (ORF, Vienna)
- Concerto Belliniano – 1985 (Radio Berlin)
- Guglielmo Tell (Rossini) – 1986 (DRS, Radio Basel)
- Concerto Verismo – 1989 (DRS, Radio Basel)
- Stabat Mater (Rossini) – 1989 (DRS, Radio Basel)
- La nuit de mai (Leoncavallo) – 1990 (RSI, Lugano)
- La favorite (Donizetti) – 1995 (RAI, Catania)

=== Television productions ===
- Jussi Björling Memorial – 1985 (Stockholm)
- I puritani (Bellini) – 1985 (ORF, Bregenz-Festival)
- Guglielmo Tell (Rossini) – 1988 (Condor, Opernhaus-Zurich)
- Concerto Per Il Centenario – 1990 (RAI 1, Teatro Bellini-Catania)
- La nuit de mai (Leoncavallo) – 1990 (RSI, Lugano)
- My Favorite Opera: Guglielmo Tell – 1993 (Film/RSI, Lugano)
- La favorite (Donizetti), Teatro Massimo Bellini – 1995 (Catania)

== See also ==
- Fisichella family
- Fisichella (surname)

== Sources ==
- Opera and Concert Database, Operissimo Concertissimo
- Opera Gems, Salvatore Fisichella - Repertoire
- CLOR Catalogue download, Discography, Singer Index lists Salvatore Fisichella with 11 recordings in which he takes part in.
- Salvatore Fisichella Discography
- Puccini Festival 1990 and 2000 1904-2007 List for Madama Butterfly
