= Domenico Ligresti =

Italian historian

- Born: 1946
- Died: 2 August 2014; Catania
- Occupations: professor, historian, writer

Domenico Ligresti (1946 – 2 August 2016) was an Italian historian. He was ordinario – full professor – of history at the University of Catania, in the Mediterranean island of Sicily. He wrote extensively on the history and culture of the island.

== Publications ==
Ligresti's principal publications were:

- Sicilia moderna: le città e gli uomini. Napoli: Guida editori, 1984
- Il governo della città: patriziati e politica nella Sicilia moderna. Catania: Cooperativa universitaria editrice catanese di magistero, 1990
- Terremoto e società in Sicilia: 1501–1800. Catania: Giuseppe Maimone, 1992
- Catania e i suoi casali. Catania: Cooperativa universitaria editrice catanese di magistero, 1995
- Dinamiche demografiche nella Sicilia moderna 1505–1806. Milano: F. Angeli, 2002
- Sicilia aperta (secoli XV–XVII): mobilità di uomini e idee. Palermo: Associazione Mediterranea, 2006
- La cultura scientifica nella Sicilia borbonica: saggi. Catania: Giuseppe Maimone, 2011
