= Rino Fisichella =

Italian Catholic prelate (born 1951)

The Most Reverend Rino Fisichella
- Pro-Prefect for the Section of New Evangelization of the Dicastery for Evangelization
- Fisichella in 2012
- Church: Latin Church
- Appointed: 5 June 2022
- Other posts: Titular Archbishop of Voghenza (2008–); President of the International Council for Catechesis (2013–)
- Previous posts: Titular Bishop of Voghenza (1998–2008); Auxiliary Bishop of Rome (1998–2008); Rector of the Pontifical Lateran University (2002–2010); President of the Pontifical Institute for Studies on Marriage and Family (2002–2006); President of the Pontifical Academy for Life (2008–2010); President of the Pontifical Council for Promoting the New Evangelization (2010–2022)

Orders
- Ordination: 13 March 1976 by Ugo Poletti
- Consecration: 12 September 1998 by Camillo Ruini

Personal details
- Born: Salvatore Fisichella; 25 August 1951 (age 75) Codogno, Lodi, Italy
- Education: Pontifical Gregorian University
- Coat of arms

Styles of Rino Fisichella
- Reference style: The Most Reverend
- Spoken style: Your Excellency
- Religious style: Monsignor

Salvatore "Rino" Fisichella (born 25 August 1951) is an Italian Catholic prelate with the rank of archbishop. He has been the pro-prefect for the New Evangelization section of the Dicastery for Evangelization since 2022. He was the president of the Pontifical Council for the Promotion of the New Evangelization from 2010 to 2022 and of the Pontifical Academy for Life from 2008 to 2010.

== Early life and ordination ==
Salvatore Fisichella was born on 25 August 1951 in Codogno in the province of Lodi. He is related to the Italian noble family of that name, which formed part of the Sicilian nobility. Fisichella studied classics at St. Francis College in Lodi, and then prepared for the priesthood at Almo Collegio Capranica. He was ordained a priest for the Diocese of Rome on 13 March 1976. He earned a doctorate in theology from the Pontifical Gregorian University in 1980.

After ordination, he held a number of positions including Professor of Fundamental Theology at the Pontifical Gregorian University and the Pontifical Lateran University, consultor of the Congregation for the Doctrine of the Faith, member of the Central Committee of the Great Jubilee Year 2000, and vice president of the Historical-Theological Commission of that committee.

He was named a Chaplain of His Holiness in 1994. He has served as a chaplain to the Italian parliament. He is a specialist in the theology of Hans Urs von Balthasar, on whom he did extensive research in 1980.

== Bishop ==
He was appointed an auxiliary bishop of Rome with the titular see of Vicohabentia on 3 July 1998 and was consecrated a bishop by Cardinal Camillo Ruini on 12 September 1998. His coat of arms is inspired by the family arms.

He was president of the diocesan commission on ecumenism and interfaith relations. He worked in the Congregation for the Doctrine of the Faith and in the Congregation for the Causes of Saints. He was said to have collaborated in the publication of Fides et Ratio in 1998.

He was named rector of the Lateran University on 18 January 2002. On 8 September 2002, he was named a member of the Congregation for the Doctrine of the Faith.

During the Muhammad caricature controversy of 2005, Fisichella said that the freedom of the press was not absolute and not meant to be used against others. He was a friend of Oriana Fallaci. In 2005, he celebrated the 100th anniversary of the catechism of Saint Pius X.

When asked in 2005 if he would give Communion to Italian politicians Romano Prodi and Pier Ferdinando Casini, Fisichella responded that he "did not see a reason" for refusing Communion to Prodi, whereas Casini "knows well the rules of the Church" and does not present himself for Communion.

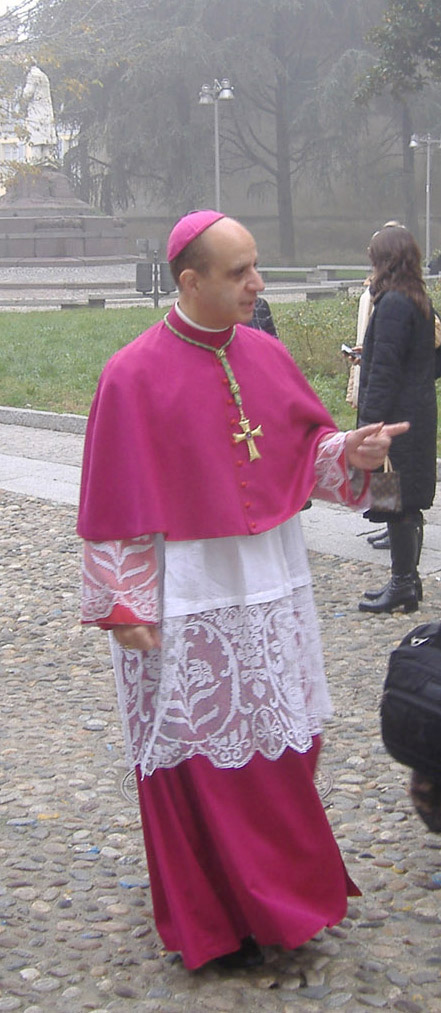
Archbishop Rino Fisichella in Lodi in 2006.

== Pontifical Academy of Life ==
On 17 June 2008, he was named president of the Pontifical Academy for Life and given the title of archbishop.

In December 2008, he wrote to the members of Luxembourg's legislature, which was considering legislation to legalize euthanasia and assisted suicide, saying a Catholic legislator has "the clear obligation to oppose any legislation that is an attack on human life" and that Catholic voters could not vote in good conscience for a legislator who voted for such a law. Prime Minister Jean-Claude Juncker criticized him for interfering.

On 24 January 2009, he urged US President Barack Obama to listen to all voices in America without "the arrogance of those who, being in power, believe they can decide of life and death." When Obama ended the ban on U.S. funding of organizations that discuss and perform abortion in the developing world, he said: "Among the many good things that he could have done, Barack Obama instead has chosen the worst. If this is one of the first acts of President Obama, with all due respect, it seems to me that the path toward disappointment has been very short."

In a case that attracted international attention in 2009, when Brazilian Archbishop Jose Cardoso Sobrinho said that an abortion performed on a nine-year-old girl pregnant with twins, reportedly fathered by her stepfather, had resulted in excommunication for the mother who arranged for the abortion and the doctors who carried it out, Fisichella defended the doctors in a statement addressed to the girl: "There are others who deserve excommunication and our forgiveness, not those who permitted you to live and who will help you to regain hope and faith." He wrote: "Her life was in serious danger because of the pregnancy in progress. How to act in these cases? An arduous decision for the physician and for the moral law itself. The conscience of the physician finds itself alone when forced to decide the best thing to do. A choice like that of having to save a life, knowing that one puts a second at serious risk, never comes easily." L'Osservatore Romano published Fisichella's essay critical of Sobrinho on its front page. Several members of the academy wrote a letter protesting Fisichella's intervention in the case. In July, L'Osservatore Romano published a document issued by the Congregation for the Doctrine of the Faith called "Clarification on procured abortion", which declared that church teaching on abortion had not changed and will not change.

== Pontifical Council for the Promotion of the New Evangelisation ==
On 30 June 2010, Fisichella was named the first president of the planned Pontifical Council for the Promotion of the New Evangelization and replaced as the rector of the Pontifical Lateran University. He identified celebrating in 2012 the 20th anniversary of the publication of the Catechism of the Catholic Church as an early project.

In November, amid reports that high-ranking Vatican officials had protected Marciel Maciel, founder of the Legionnaires of Christ, Fisichella said investigations should focus on those inside the Legionnaires who frustrated Vatican investigations, "those who took his appointments, those who kept his agenda, those who drove him around".

In February 2011, following public controversies with respect to Bishop Richard Williamson's denial of the Holocaust and the Regensburg lecture's impact on Christian-Muslim relations, Fisichella dismissed as premature the idea of assessing the papacy of Pope Benedict XVI. He said: "We're still at the beginning of a pontificate, and in my opinion it's always difficult to make judgments or offer a far-ranging analysis at the beginning. ...A sense of history should make us prudent and cautious from this point of view."

In August 2011, Fischella unveiled the Mission Metropolis which was to start in Lent 2012. The plan was to revive Christianity in Europe. The cities that would take part were: Barcelona, Budapest, Brussels, Dublin, Cologne, Lisbon, Liverpool, Paris, Turin, Warsaw and Vienna. The plan emphasized ordinary pastoral care activities, particularly in the field of formation for the priesthood, and the implementation of activities such as reading of the Gospel and the Confessions of St Augustine.

On 10 December 2011, he was appointed to a five-year renewable term as a member of the Pontifical Council for Culture. On 29 December 2011, he was appointed to a similar term as a member of the Pontifical Council for Social Communications. On 7 March 2012, he was named a member of the Pontifical Committee for International Eucharistic Congresses.

In March 2012, when former British Prime Minister Tony Blair, a Catholic since 2007, expressed support for same sex marriage, Fisichella said: "If the stories in the press about Blair's thinking are true, I think he should examine his conscience carefully".

In May 2017, he said that Pope Benedict XVI should not use the title "Pope emeritus", "which theologically creates more problems rather than solving them". He praised Benedict XVI's decision to retire, but said he hoped another title could be found.

== Dicastery for Evangelization ==
When Pope Francis's reorganization of the Curia took effect on 5 June 2022, Fisichella became pro-prefect of one section of the new Dicastery for the Evangelization of Peoples: the Section of New Evangelization of the Dicastery for Evangelization.

Luce was unveiled by Fisichella on 28 October 2024. He said that Luce was inspired by the Catholic church's desire "to live even within the pop culture so beloved by our youth".

== See also ==
- Fisichella family
- The Roman Catholic Church and Abortion

Catholic Church titles
Preceded by Angelo Scola	Rector of the Pontifical Lateran University; 18 January 2002 – 30 June 2010	Succeeded by Enrico dal Covolo
Preceded by Elio Sgreccia	President of the Pontifical Academy for Life; 17 June 2008 – 30 June 2010	Succeeded by Ignacio Carrasco de Paula
Office established	President of the Pontifical Council for the Promotion of the New Evangelisation; 30 June 2010 – 5 June 2022	Office abolished
Office established	Pro-Prefect for the Section of Fundamental Questions regarding Evangelization in the World of the Dicastery for Evangelization; 5 June 2022 –	Incumbent
