= Domenico Fisichella =

Italian academic and politician (born 1935)

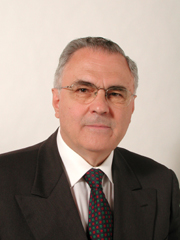

Minister of Cultural Heritage and Activities
- In office 10 May 1994 – 17 January 1995
- Prime Minister: Silvio Berlusconi
- Preceded by: Alberto Ronchey
- Succeeded by: Antonio Paolucci

Member of the Senate of the Republic
- In office 15 April 1994 – 28 April 2008

Personal details
- Born: Domenico Fisichella; 15 September 1935 (age 91) Messina, Italy
- Party: National Alliance (1995–2005); The Daisy (2005–2007)
- Height: 1.76 m (5 ft 9 in)
- Education: University of Perugia
- Occupation: Academic

Domenico Fisichella (born 15 September 1935) is an Italian academic and politician, who served as culture minister in the first Berlusconi government from 1994 to 1995.

== Career ==
Fisichella taught political science at Sapienza University of Rome and the Luiss Business School. He wrote for Rome daily Il Tempo.

He was a founding member of the right-wing National Alliance. He was the constitutional advisor of Gianfranco Fini, the leader of the party. He was appointed minister of culture to the first cabinet of Silvio Berlusconi on 10 May 1994. Fisichella replaced Alberto Ronchey in the post. Fisichella's ministerial term ended in December 1994 when the cabinet resigned.

In 1994, Fisichella became a member of the Senate of the Republic and served there until 2008. He became an independent senator when he left the National Alliance in January 1996. He served as the deputy speaker of the Italian senate for ten years. After leaving politics, he continued to work at the University of Florence and Sapienza University of Rome, and as of 2012 he was also a lecturer at Luiss University of Rome.

=== Views ===
Fisichella was the ideologue of the National Alliance and a monarchist.

=== Controversy ===
Although Fisichella is a distinguished and leading political scientist in international academic circles, his appointment as culture minister caused serious concerns in the international press.

=== Works ===
Fisichella is the author of several books, including Istituzioni politiche. Struttura e pensiero (1999); Denaro e democrazia. Dall’antica Grecia all’economia globale (2000); Politica e mutamento sociale (2002) and Elezioni e democrazia. Un’analisi comparata (2003).

== See also ==
- Fisichella family

Political offices
| Preceded by Alberto Ronchey | Minister of Cultural Heritage and Activities; 1994–1995 | Succeeded by Antonio Paolucci |
