= Francesco Fisichella =

- Born: 1841; Catania, Kingdom of the Two Sicilies
- Died: 28 December 1908 (aged 66–67); Messina, Kingdom of Italy
- Cause of death: 1908 Messina earthquake
- Education: University of Catania; University of Messina

Francesco Fisichella (1841 – 28 December 1908) was an Italian presbyter, philosopher, and jurist.

== Biography ==
He was born in Catania to the noble Sicilian family of Fisichella.

From 1884, he was a professor at the Theological Institute of Messina. During these years, he taught philosophy at the University of Catania and at the University of Messina. Fisichella was the author of works regarding theology and law. He served as director of the Catania Civic Library.

In 1882, Canon Francesco Fisichella delivered an oration, which was established on 28 February as the presumable date of the Norman king's death of Roger II of Sicily.

He died on 28 December 1908, as a result of an intense earthquake in Messina.

== Works ==
- Roma e il Mondo nel 1869: Discorso recitato nella chiesa del gesuiti in Catania il 31 dicembre 1869 (in Italian). 1870.
- Il protestantismo nel suo principio fondamentale: risposta del Can. Francesco Fisichella al Sig. Gaetano Zocco, ministro evangelico metodista (in Italian). 1874.
- Sul fondamento del diritto di proprietà (in Italian). 1883.
- Evoluzione e diritto: prolusione letta nella R. Università di Catania. 1884.
- La donna e i suoi diritti: osservazioni (in Italian). 1884.
- Sulla realtà della persona giuridica (in Italian). Catania. 1885.
- Dei rapporti tra morale e diritto: studio del prof. can. Francesco Fisichella (in Italian). Catania. 1886.
- Della interdizione patrimoniale del condannato a pena perpetua: Secondo l'ultimo disegno del Codice penale italiano (in Italian and English). Catania. 1888. ISBN 1162354690.
- Delle Obbligazioni Naturali: Saggio Critico (in Italian). 1889. ISBN 0266353703.
- La teoria dei contratti nella Filosofia del Diritto: studi (in Italian). Messina. 1890.
- Il Prof. P.A. Maugeri e il suo sistema filosofico (in Italian). 1892.
- Il divorzio: osservazioni critiche (in Italian). 1894.
- Lotta ed Etica: Discorso letto il 14 Novembre 1896 nella R. Università di Messina per l'inaugurazione dell'anno accademico 1896 – 97 (in Italian). 1897.
- Chiesa e stato nel matrimonio: studio critico di legislazione matrimoniale (in Italian and English). 1899.
- La Psicologia nelle scienze umane (in Italian). 1901.
- Il diritto e i sordomuti (in Italian). Catania. 1902.
