= Baldassare Cenci =

Baldassare Cenci may refer to:

- Baldassare Cenci (seniore) (1648–1709), Italian Roman Catholic cardinal
- Baldassare Cenci (iuniore) (1710–1763), Italian Roman Catholic cardinal
