= Prospero Bottini =

Roman Catholic prelate

Most Reverend Prospero Bottini
- Titular Archbishop of Myra
- Church: Catholic Church
- In office: 1675–1712
- Predecessor: Giacinto Tarugi
- Successor: Giovanni Francesco Nicolai

Personal details
- Born: 1621 Lucca, Italy
- Died: 21 March 1712 (age 91)

Prospero Bottini (1621 – 21 March 1712) was a Roman Catholic prelate who served as Titular Archbishop of Myra (1675–1712).

== Biography ==
Prospero Bottini was born in Lucca, Italy in 1621. On 15 July 1675, he was appointed during the papacy of Pope Clement X as Titular Archbishop of Myra. He served as Titular Archbishop of Myra until his death on 21 March 1712.

== Episcopal succession ==
Episcopal succession of Prospero Bottini

While bishop, he was the principal co-consecrator of:

- Giuseppe de Lazzara, Bishop of Alife (1676);
- Vincenzo Cavalli (Gaballi), Bishop of Bertinoro (1676);
- Giovanni de Torrecilla y Cárdenas, Bishop of L'Aquila (1676);
- Alessandro Strozzi, Bishop of Arezzo (1677);
- Andrea Bonito, Bishop of Capaccio (1677);
- Nicola Oliva, Bishop of Cortona (1677);
- Giovanni Borgoforte, Bishop of Nona (1677);
- Carlo Berlingeri, Archbishop of Santa Severina (1679);
- Francesco Megale, Bishop of Isola (1679);
- Giacomo Villani, Bishop of Caiazzo (1679);
- Giovanni Paolo Meniconi, Bishop of Bagnoregio (1680);
- Filippo Lenti, Bishop of Ascoli Satriano (1680);
- Giambattista Febei, Bishop of Acquapendente (1683);
- Gasparo Cavalieri, Archbishop of Capua (1687);
- Jan Kazimierz Denhoff, Bishop of Cesena (1687);
- Michelangelo Mattei, Titular Archbishop of Hadrianopolis in Haemimonto (1689);
- Charles Montecatini, Titular Archbishop of Chalcedon (1690);
- Leone Strozzi (archbishop), Bishop of Pistoia e Prato (1690);
- Raimondo Ferretti, Bishop of Recanati e Loreto (1690);
- Giovanni Matteo Marchetti, Bishop of Arezzo (1691);
- Federico Caccia, Titular Archbishop of Laodicea in Phrygia (1693);
- José Guerrero de Torres, Bishop of Gaeta (1693);
- Giuseppe Migliaccio, Bishop of Patti (1693);
- Lorenzo Gherardi, Bishop of Recanati e Loreto (1693);
- Matteo Gagliani, Bishop of Fondi (1693);
- Gerolamo Ventimiglia, Bishop of Lipari (1694);
- Alfonso Basilio Ghetaldo, Bishop of Stagno (1694);
- Alexander Sforza, Titular Archbishop of Neocaesarea in Ponto (1695);
- Michelangelo dei Conti, Titular Archbishop of Tarsus (1695);
- Gregorio Compagni, Bishop of Sansepolcro (1696);
- Domenico Tarugi, Archbishop (Personal Title) of Ferrara (1696);
- Nicolò Nardini, Bishop of Acquapendente (1696);
- Antonio Grassi (bishop), Bishop of Chioggia (1696);
- Pietro Paolo Gerardi, Bishop of Anagni (1696);
- Bartholomaeus Olivieri, Bishop of Umbriatico (1696);
- Onofrio Montesoro, Bishop of Castellaneta (1696);
- Scipio Carocci (Carocius), Bishop of Acerno (1696);
- Andrea Deodati, Archbishop of Rossano (1697);
- Giuseppe Rodoero, Bishop of Acerra (1697);
- Giambattista Isnardi de Castello, Bishop of Mondovi (1697);
- Lorenzo Kreutter de Corvinis, Bishop of Vieste (1697);
- Fortunato Durante, Bishop of Squillace (1697);
- Ambrosio Angelini, Bishop of Acquapendente (1697);
- Antonio Spinelli, Bishop of Melfi e Rapolla (1697);
- Giuseppe Maria Bondola, Bishop of Satriano e Campagna (1697);
- Alessandro Croce, Bishop of Cremona (1697);
- Uldericus Nardi, Bishop of Bagnoregio (1698);
- Giulio Dalla Rosa, Bishop of Borgo San Donnino (1698);
- Giovanni Francesco Barbarigo, Bishop of Verona (1698);
- Alessandro Carlo Gaetano Varano, Bishop of Macerata e Tolentino (1698);
- Cesare Sperelli, Bishop of Terni (1698);
- Francesco Andrea Grassi, Bishop of Caorle (1700); and
- Ulisse Giuseppe Gozzadini, Titular Archbishop of Teodosia (1700).

== See also ==
- Catholic Church in Italy

== External links and other references ==
- Cheney, David M. "Myra (Titular See)". Catholic-Hierarchy.org. (for Chronology of Bishops) ^{[self-published]}
- Chow, Gabriel. "Titular Metropolitan See of Myra (Turkey)". GCatholic.org. (for Chronology of Bishops) ^{[self-published]}

Catholic Church titles
Preceded by Giacinto Tarugi	Titular Archbishop of Myra; 1675–1712	Succeeded by Giovanni Francesco Nicolai
