= Mignucci =

Mignucci is an Italian surname. Notable people with this surname include:

- Andrés Mignucci (born 1957), Puerto Rican architect and urbanist
- Antonio Mignucci (born 1964), Puerto Rican oceanographer
- Pompeo Mignucci, (1597-1654), Italian archbishop
- Stefano Mignucci (born 1965), Italian director
