= Giuseppe Maria Bondola =

16th and 17th-century Catholic bishop

Most Reverend Giuseppe Maria Bondola
- Bishop of Satriano e Campagna
- Church: Catholic Church
- Diocese: Diocese of Satriano e Campagna
- In office: 1697–1713
- Predecessor: Girolamo Prignano
- Successor: Francesco Saverio Fontana

Orders
- Consecration: 8 December 1697 by Baldassare Cenci (seniore)

Personal details
- Born: 24 March 1648 Naples, Italy
- Died: 4 February 1713 (age 64)

Giuseppe Maria Bondola, O.F.M. Conv. (1648–1713) was a Roman Catholic prelate who served as Bishop of Satriano e Campagna (1697–1713).

== Biography ==
Bondola was born in Naples, Italy on 24 March 1648. He was ordained a deacon on 5 April 1670 in the Order of Friars Minor Conventual and then ordained a priest on 14 March 1671. On 2 December 1697, he was appointed during the papacy of Pope Innocent XII as Bishop of Satriano e Campagna. On 8 December 1697, he was consecrated bishop by Baldassare Cenci (seniore), Archbishop of Fermo, with Prospero Bottini, Titular Archbishop of Myra, and Sperello Sperelli, Bishop of Terni, serving as co-consecrators. He served as Bishop of Satriano e Campagna until his death on 4 February 1713.

== External links and additional sources ==
- Cheney, David M. "Diocese of Satriano e Campagna". Catholic-Hierarchy.org. (for Chronology of Bishops) ^{[self-published]}
- Chow, Gabriel. "Titular Episcopal See of Satriano (Italy)". GCatholic.org. (for Chronology of Bishops) ^{[self-published]}

Catholic Church titles
Preceded by Girolamo Prignano	Bishop of Satriano e Campagna; 1697–1713	Succeeded by Francesco Saverio Fontana
