= Francesco Casati =

17th-century Italian Catholic bishop

Most Reverend Francesco Casati
- Titular Archbishop of Trapezus
- Church: Catholic Church
- In office: 1670–1702
- Predecessor: Agostino Franciotti
- Successor: Carlos Borja Centellas y Ponce de León

Orders
- Consecration: 15 June 1670 by Rinaldo d'Este

Personal details
- Born: 1620 Plaisance
- Died: 16 October 1702 (age 82)

Francesco Casati (1620 – 16 October 1702) was a Roman Catholic prelate who served as Titular Archbishop of Trapezus (1670–1702).

== Biography ==
Francesco Casati was born in 1620 in Plaisance. On 2 June 1670, he was appointed during the papacy of Pope Clement X as Titular Archbishop of Trapezus. On 15 June 1670, he was consecrated bishop by Rinaldo d'Este, Cardinal-Priest of Santa Pudenziana, with Francesco Maria Febei, Titular Archbishop of Tarsus, and Vincenzo Candiotti, Bishop of Bagnoregio, serving as co-consecrators. He served as Titular Archbishop of Trapezus until his death on 16 October 1702.

== Episcopal succession ==
Episcopal succession of Francesco Casati
While bishop, Casati was the principal co-consecrator of:
- Manoel Pereira, Bishop of São Sebastião do Rio de Janeiro (1677);
- Giovanni Carlo Antonelli, Bishop of Ferentino (1677);
- Ercole Visconti, Titular Archbishop of Tamiathis (1678);
- Diego Ibáñez de la Madrid y Bustamente, Bishop of Trivento (1679);
- Benedetto Milazzi, Bishop of Ostuni (1679);
- Giovanni Paolo Meniconi, Bishop of Bagnoregio (1680);
- Filippo Lenti, Bishop of Ascoli Satriano (1680);
- Giuseppe Consoli, Bishop of Bisignano (1680);
- Alberto Mugiasca, Bishop of Alessandria della Paglia (1680);
- Benedetto Giacinto Sangermano, Bishop of Nusco (1680);
- Federico Visconti, Archbishop of Milan (1681);
- Rainutius Baschi, Bishop of Senigallia (1682);
- Giuseppe Felice Barlacci, Bishop of Narni (1683);
- Bernardin Marchese, Bishop of Sarsina (1683);
- Giambattista Febei, Bishop of Acquapendente (1683);
- Flavio Chigi, Cardinal-Bishop of Albano (1686);
- Muzio Dandini, Bishop of Senigallia (1686);
- Filippo Tani, Bishop of Città Ducale (1686);
- Giulio Giacomo Castellani, Bishop of Cagli (1686);
- Giacomo Porrata, Bishop of Noli (1687);
- Francesco Gori, Bishop of Catanzaro (1687); and
- Gasparo Cavalieri, Archbishop of Capua (1687).

Catholic Church titles
Preceded by Agostino Franciotti	Titular Archbishop of Trapezus; 1670–1702	Succeeded by Carlos Borja Centellas y Ponce de León
