= Acquapendente Cathedral =

Cathedral in Acquapendente, Lazio, Italy

Coordinates: 42.7426°N 11.8713°E

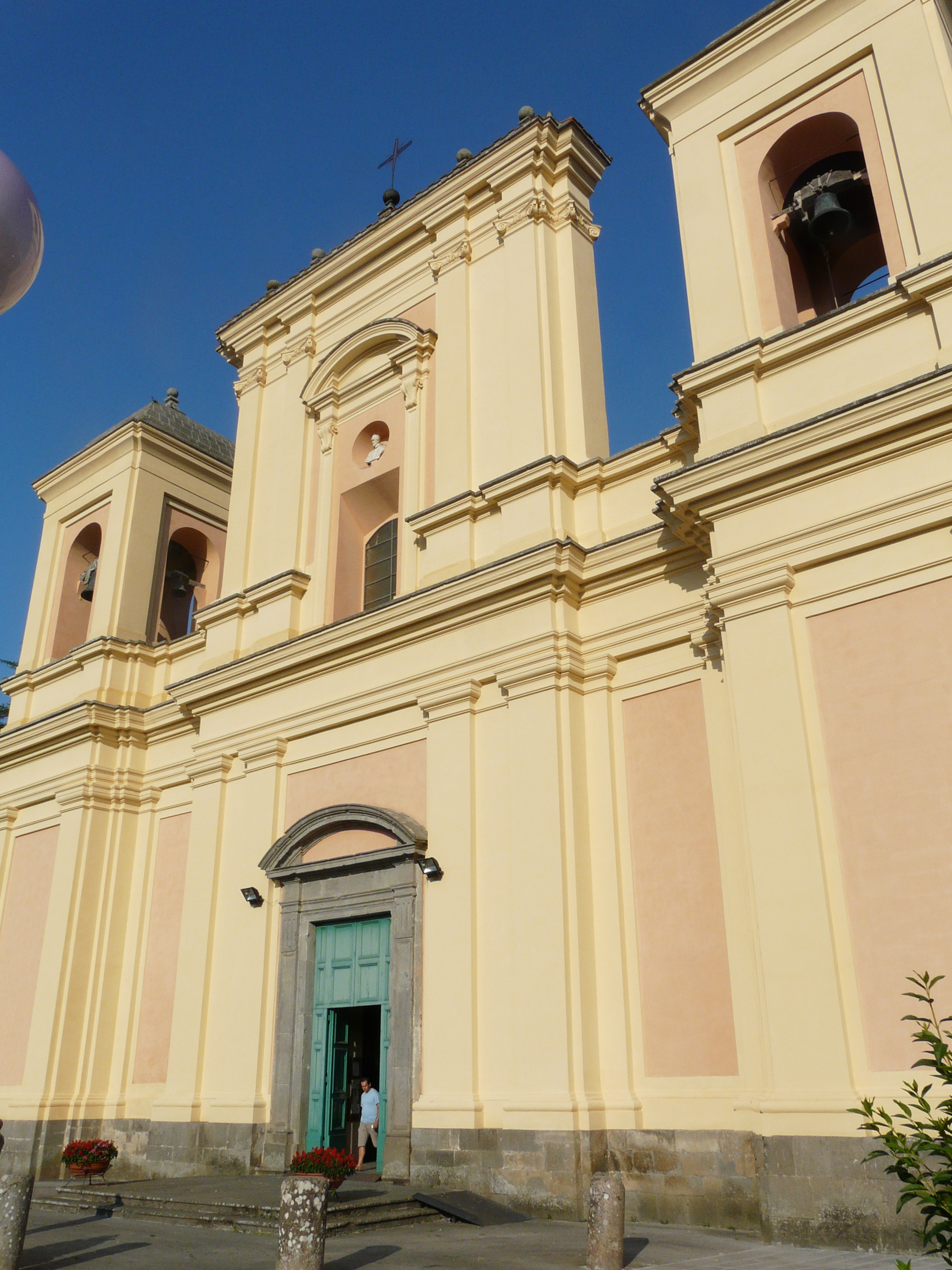
West front

Acquapendente Cathedral (Italian: Duomo di Acquapendente, Basilica Cattedrale di San Sepolcro) is a Roman Catholic cathedral, dedicated to the Holy Sepulchre, in the town of Acquapendente in Lazio, Italy. Formerly the episcopal seat of the Diocese of Acquapendente, it is now a co-cathedral in the Diocese of Viterbo.

== History ==
Location of Acquapendente Cathedral

The building was in origin the church of a former Benedictine monastery. During the Middle Ages the church was very popular as a destination for pilgrims and cripples seeking miraculous cures. It was made a cathedral in 1649 as the seat of the Bishop of Acquapendente, a diocese created in that year in succession to the suppressed Diocese of Castro del Lazio, from the former cathedral of which it received many treasures and furnishings, and the relics of Saint Bernard of Castro. The bishopric was united on 27 March 1986 with several others to form the Diocese of Viterbo, Acquapendente, Bagnoregio, Montefiascone, Tuscania e San Martino al Monte Cimino (renamed in 1991 the Diocese of Viterbo), in which Acquapendente Cathedral is a co-cathedral.

It has also traditionally enjoyed the status of a basilica minor.

== Description ==
Originally the church of a former Benedictine monastery, the present building began as a Romanesque church of the 12th century. It has been the object of many attempts at beautification over the centuries, however, particularly since becoming a cathedral, and the original structure is overlaid by the many later works, largely of painted terracotta and stucco, such as the Neoclassical west front.

The crypt, which dates from the second half of the 10th century and is thus older than the main structure, is of especial interest, for its unusual arrangement of pillars, which divide the space into nine small aisles, and for the elaborately carved zoomorphic capitals of the pillars themselves. The crypt also contains a blood-stained stone said to come from the Holy Sepulchre in Jerusalem, whence the dedication.

The cathedral also contains two bas-reliefs credited to Agostino di Duccio: Tobias and the Angel and the Victory of Saint Michael over the Dragon.
