= Galeazzo Marescotti =

Italian Catholic cardinal (1627–1726)

His Eminence Galeazzo Marescotti
- Cardinal-Priest of San Lorenzo in Lucina
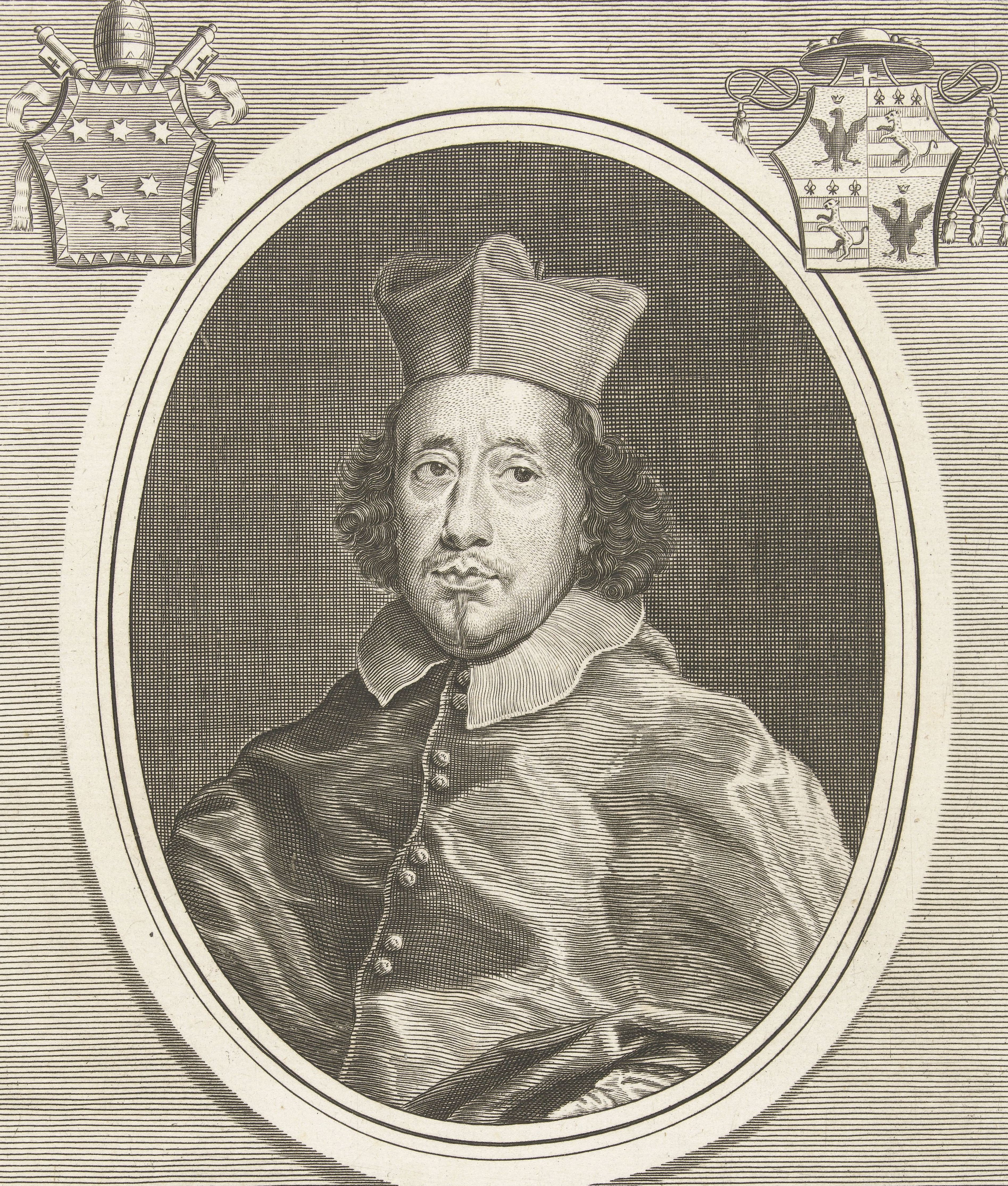
- Galeazzo Marescotti (1675)
- Church: Catholic Church
- Appointed: 30 April 1708
- Term ended: 3 July 1727
- Predecessor: Francesco Nerli
- Successor: Giuseppe Sacripante
- Previous posts: Titular Archbishop of Corinthus (1668–75); Apostolic Nuncio to Poland (1668–70); Apostolic Nuncio to Spain (1670–75); Cardinal-Priest of San Bernardo alle Terme (1676–81); Bishop of Tivoli (1679–85); Cardinal-Priest of Santi Quirico e Giulitta (1681–1700); Camerlengo of the College of Cardinals (1687–88); Prefect of the Congregation of the Council (1692–95); Vice-Camerlengo of the Apostolic Camera (1698); Secretary of the Commission of Roman and Universal Inquisition (1700–16); Cardinal-Priest of Santa Prassede (1700–08); Protopriest of the College of Cardinals (1710–15)

Orders
- Ordination: 29 September 1662
- Consecration: 4 March 1668 by Pietro Vidoni
- Created cardinal: 27 May 1675 by Pope Clement X
- Rank: Cardinal-Priest

Personal details
- Born: Galeazzo Marescotti; 1 October 1627 Vignanello, Viterbo, Papal States
- Died: 3 July 1726 (age 98) Rome, Papal States
- Parents: Sforza Vicino Marescotti; Vittoria Ruspoli

Galeazzo Marescotti (1 October 1627 – 3 July 1726) was an Italian cardinal.

== Biography ==
He was born in Vignanello, Italy. His father was named Sforza Marescotti and his mother was Vittoria Ruspoli, both born to prominent aristocratic families of Bologna and Modena. Galeazzo studied in seminary, and after ordination by the age of 23 years, he was appointed to the papal office of prothonotary apostolic.

From 1661 to 1663, he was governor of Ascoli Piceno. In 1663, he was appointed director of the Congregation of inquisitor Sancti Officii. In 1665, he was promoted to commissioner of the Holy Office of Pope Alexander VII. In 1668, he was appointed Titular Archbishop of Corinth by Pope Clement IX and was sent on a diplomatic mission to Vienna. He was appointed nuncio to Poland. On 4 March 1668, he was consecrated Bishop by Pietro Vidoni, Bishop of Lodi with Giacomo de Angelis, Archbishop of Urbino, and Carlo de' Vecchi, Bishop Emeritus of Chiusi as co-consecrators.

On 13 August 1670, he was appointed apostolic nuncio in Spain by Pope Clement X, and remained at that post in Madrid till 1675. Pope Clement X elevated him to the rank of cardinal in the consistory of 27 May 1675, and assigned him the title of San Bernardo alle Terme. From 1676 to 1679, he was papal governor in Ferrara. In 1679, he was appointed Bishop of Tivoli. In the Cathedral of San Lorenzo, he built for the canons at his own expense a finely worked walnut wood choir and adorned a chapel with colored marble and other ornaments. He reformed the clergy with a new synod. Donated to the cathedral the sum of 500 scudi, with the obligation of an anniversary for the repose of his soul and erected several chapels. In 1684, he resigned the bishopric in the hands of Innocent XI. The city was always in the heart, in fact in 1705, he founded the city, at its expense, a monastery for nuns of St. Elizabeth, which finally gave in 1721 the most beautiful and precious furnishings of his private chapel.

In 1681, he received the title of Saints Quirico and Giuditta. In 1700, he received the title of Santa Prassede. In 1708, he received the title of San Lorenzo in Lucina. On his death, he was the oldest member of the College of Cardinals following Cardinal Carpegna (born 1625), who died in 1714 at the age of 88.

== Episcopal succession ==
Episcopal succession of Galeazzo Marescotti

While bishop, he was the principal consecrator of:

- Bartolomé Garcia de Escañuela, Bishop of Puerto Rico (1670);
- Giambattista Febei, Bishop of Acquapendente (1683);
- Giovanni Alfonso Petrucci, Bishop of Belcastro (1686);
- Stefano Giuseppe Menatti, Titular Bishop of Cyrene (1686);
- Domenico Maria Marchese, Bishop of Pozzuoli (1688);
- Pietro Antonio d'Alessandro, Bishop of San Marco (1688);
- Andrea de Rossi, Archbishop of Rossano (1688);
- Baldassarre Nosadini, Bishop of Krk (1688);
- Juan Bonilla, Bishop of Ariano (1689);
- Francesco Ramírez, Archbishop of Brindisi (1689);
- Michele Petirro, Bishop of Termoli (1689);
- Marcello d'Aste, Titular Archbishop of Athenae (1692);
- Giovanni Battista Carrone, Bishop of Strongoli (1692);
- Pietro Martire Giustiniani, Archbishop of Naxos (1692);
- Federico Caccia, Titular Archbishop of Laodicea in Phrygia (1693);
- Luca Antonio Eustachi, Bishop of Città di Castello (1693);
- Michael Cantelmi, Bishop of Umbriatico (1693);
- Giuseppe Migliaccio, Bishop of Patti (1693);
- Lorenzo Gherardi, Bishop of Recanati e Loreto (1693);
- Matteo Gagliani, Bishop of Fondi (1693);
- Leonardo Cassiani, Bishop of Teramo (1693);
- Giacinto Gaetano Chiurlia (Chyurlia), Bishop of Giovinazzo (1693);
- Francesco Protonobilissimo, Bishop of Trevico (1693);
- Fernando Manuel de Mejía, Bishop of Zamora (1693);
- Carlo Giuseppe Morozzo, Bishop of Bobbio (1693);
- Giulio Marzi, Auxiliary Bishop of Ostia-Velletri (1693);
- Biagio Gambaro, Bishop of Telese o Cerreto Sannita (1693);
- Gerolamo Ventimiglia, Bishop of Lipari (1694);
- Alfonso Basilio Ghetaldo, Bishop of Ston (1694);
- Alexander Sforza, Titular Archbishop of Neocaesarea in Ponto (1695);
- Michelangelo dei Conti, Titular Archbishop of Tarsus (1695); and
- Innico Caracciolo, Bishop of Aversa (1697).

Catholic Church titles
Preceded by Stefano Ugolini	Titular Archbishop of Corinthus; 1668-1676	Succeeded by Francesco Martelli
Preceded by Antonio Pignatelli del Rastrello	Apostolic Nuncio to Poland; 1668-1670	Succeeded by Francesco Nerli (iuniore)
Preceded by Antonio de Benavides y Bazán	Apostolic Nuncio to Spain; 1670-1675	Succeeded by Savo Millini
Preceded by Giovanni Bona	Cardinal-Priest of San Bernardo alle Terme; 1676-1681	Succeeded by Giambattista Costaguti
Preceded by Mario Alberizzi	Archbishop (Personal Title) of Tivoli; 1679-1684	Succeeded by Antonio Fonseca (bishop)
Preceded by Lorenzo Raggi	Cardinal-Priest of Santi Quirico e Giulitta; 1681-1700	Succeeded by Fulvio Astalli
Preceded by Francesco Maidalchini	Cardinal-Priest of Santa Prassede; 1700-1708	Succeeded by Fabrizio Spada
Preceded by Francesco Nerli (iuniore)	Cardinal-Priest of San Lorenzo in Lucina; 1708-1726	Succeeded by Giuseppe Sacripante
Records
Preceded by Gaspare Carpegna	Oldest living Member of the Sacred College; 9 May 1714 - 3 July 1726	Succeeded by Innico Caracciolo
