= Baldassare Cenci (seniore) =

Italian cardinal

His Eminence Baldassare Cenci
- Cardinal-Priest of San Pietro in Montorio; Archbishop of Fermo
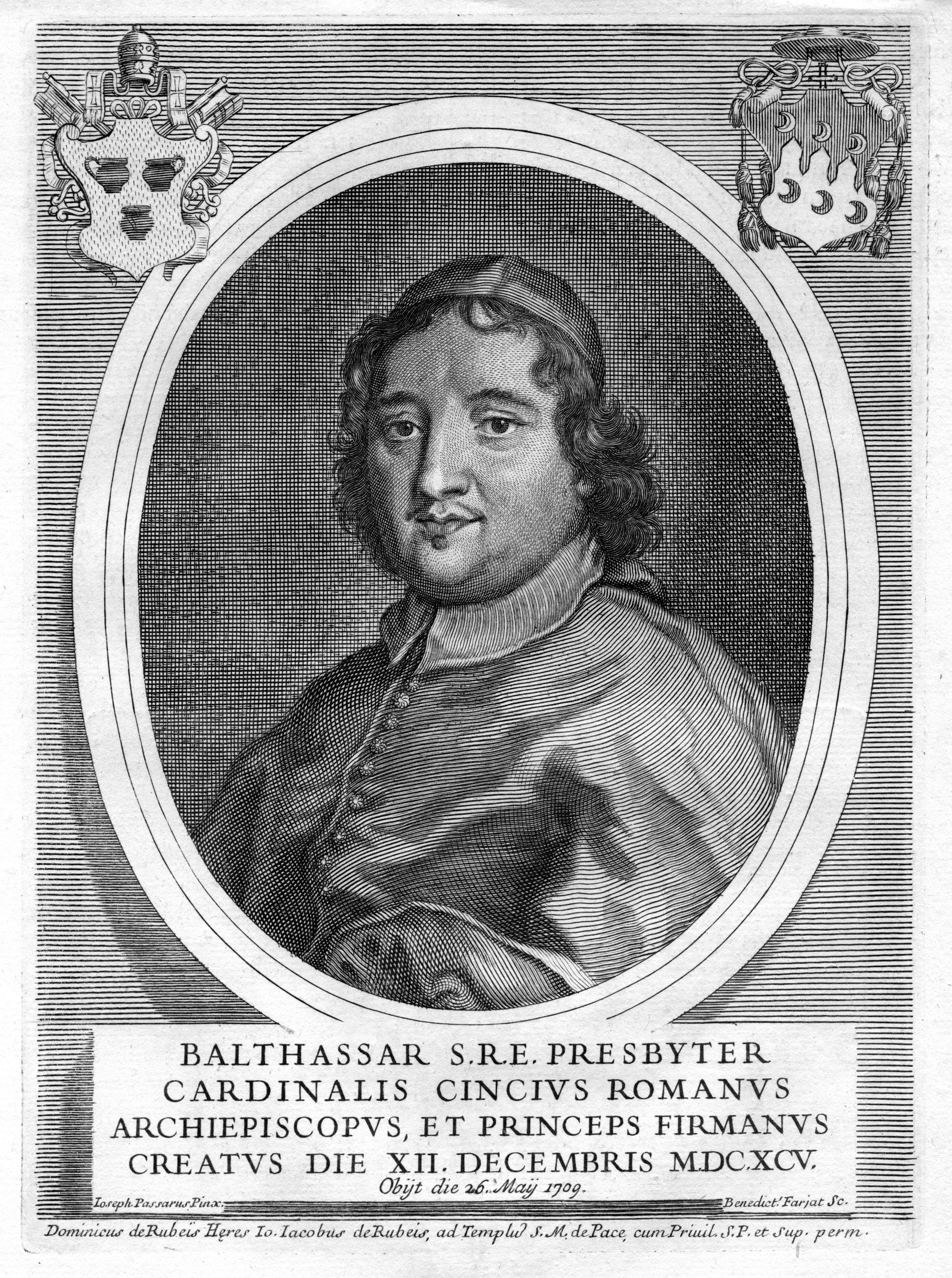
- Portrait of Baldassare Cenci
- Church: Catholic Church

Orders
- Consecration: 30 September 1691 by Fabrizio Spada

Personal details
- Born: 1648 Rome, Italy
- Died: 26 May 1709 (age 61) Fermo, Italy

Baldassare Cenci, seniore (1648–1709) was a Roman Catholic cardinal.

== Biography ==
Baldassare Cenci was born in 1648 in Rome, the youngest and fifth child of Virginio Cenci and Maria Vittoria Verospi. His nephew is cardinal Baldassare Cenci (iuniore).

On 30 September 1691, he was consecrated bishop by Fabrizio Spada, Cardinal-Priest of San Crisogono, with Ercole Visconti, Titular Archbishop of Tamiathis, and Michelangelo Mattei, Titular Archbishop of Hadrianopolis in Haemimonto, serving as co-consecrators.

Cenci died on 26 May 1709 in Fermo, Italy.

== Episcopal succession ==
Episcopal succession of Baldassare Cenci

While bishop, he was the principal consecrator of:

- Antonio Spinelli, Bishop of Melfi e Rapolla (1697);
- Giuseppe Maria Bondola, Bishop of Satriano e Campagna (1697);
- Alessandro Croce, Bishop of Cremona (1697);
- Simone Paolo Aleotti, Bishop of Civita Castellana e Orte (1698);
- Joseph-François Gualtieri, Bishop of Vaison (1703);

and the principal co-consecrator of:

- Giovanni Giacomo Cavallerini, Titular Archbishop of Nicaea and Apostolic Nuncio to France (1692);
- Alessandro Lambert, Bishop of Aosta (1692); and
- Gerolamo Ubertino Provana, Bishop of Alba (1692).

Catholic Church titles
Preceded by Johann Hugo von Orsbeck	Titular Archbishop of Larissa in Thessalia; 1691–1697	Succeeded by Francesco Acquaviva d'Aragona
Preceded by Gianfrancesco Ginetti	Archbishop of Fermo; 1697–1709	Succeeded by Girolamo Mattei (bishop)
Preceded by Domenico Maria Corsi	Cardinal-Priest of San Pietro in Montorio; 1697–1709	Succeeded by Antonio Francesco Sanvitale
