= Agostino Franciotti =

Italian prelate (1630–1670)

Most Reverend Agostino Franciotti
- Titular Archbishop of Trapezus; Apostolic Nuncio to Germany
- Church: Catholic Church
- In office: 1654–1670
- Predecessor: Crispin Fuk von Hradiste
- Successor: Francesco Casati

Orders
- Consecration: 10 May 1654 by Marcantonio Franciotti

Personal details
- Born: 1630 Rome, Italy
- Died: February 1670 (age 40) Aachen, Germany

Agostino Franciotti (1630–1670) was a Roman Catholic prelate who served as Apostolic Nuncio to Germany (1666–1670) and Titular Archbishop of Trapezus (1654–1670).

== Biography ==
Agostino Franciotti was born Rome, Italy in 1630. On 4 May 1654, he was appointed during the papacy of Pope Innocent X as Titular Archbishop of Trapezus. On 10 May 1654, he was consecrated bishop by Marcantonio Franciotti, Cardinal-Priest of Santa Maria della Pace. On 10 Jul 1666, he was appointed during the papacy of Pope Alexander VII as Apostolic Nuncio to Germany. He served as Apostolic Nuncio to Germany until his death in February 1670.

== Episcopal succession ==
While bishop, he was the principal co-consecrator of:

- Gianlucido Palombara, Bishop of Pesaro (1658);
- Cesare Cancellotti, Bishop of Bisceglie (1658);
- Anselmo Dandini, Bishop of Cervia (1662); and
- Ignazio D'Amico, Bishop of Patti (1662).

== External links and additional sources ==
- Cheney, David M. "Nunciature to Germany". Catholic-Hierarchy.org. ^{[self-published]}
- Chow, Gabriel. "Apostolic Nunciature to Germany". GCatholic.org. ^{[self-published]}

Catholic Church titles
Preceded by Crispin Fuk von Hradiste	Titular Archbishop of Trapezus; 1654–1670	Succeeded by Francesco Casati
Preceded by Giuseppe Sanfelice	Apostolic Nuncio to Germany; 1666–1670	Succeeded by Francesco Buonvisi
