= Nicolò Leti =

Roman Catholic bishop

Most Reverend Nicolò Leti
- Bishop of Acquapendente
- Church: Catholic Church
- Diocese: Diocese of Acquapendente
- In office: 1655–1674
- Predecessor: Pompeo Mignucci
- Successor: Lodovico Magni

Personal details
- Born: 1605 Spoleto, Italy
- Died: Unknown

Nicolò Leti was a Roman Catholic prelate who served as Bishop of Acquapendente (1655–1674).

== Biography ==
Nicolò Leti was born in Spoleto, Italy in 1605. On 14 June 1655, he was appointed during the papacy of Pope Alexander VII as Bishop of Acquapendente. He served as Bishop of Acquapendente until his resignation on 30 September 1674.

== External links and additional sources ==
- Cheney, David M. "Diocese of Acquapendente". Catholic-Hierarchy.org. (for Chronology of Bishops) ^{[self-published]}
- Chow, Gabriel. "Titular Episcopal See of Acquapendente". GCatholic.org. (for Chronology of Bishops) ^{[self-published]}

Catholic Church titles
Preceded by Pompeo Mignucci	Bishop of Acquapendente; 1655–1674	Succeeded by Lodovico Magni
