= Viterbo Cathedral =

Cathedral in Viterbo, Lazio, Italy

Coordinates: 42°24′55″N 12°06′03″E

- Duomo di Viterbo
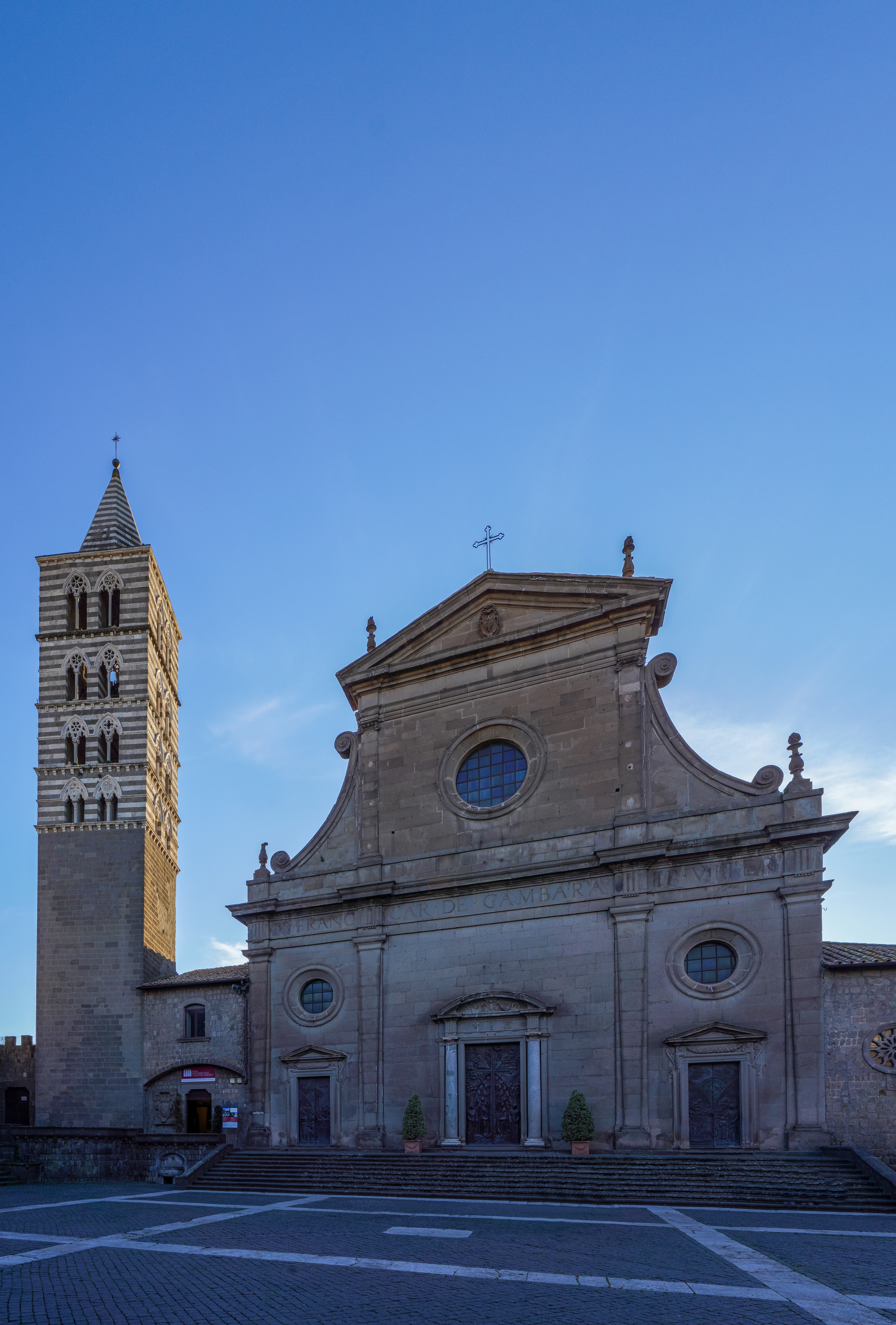
- The West front

Religion
- Affiliation: Roman Catholic Church
- Ecclesiastical or organizational status: Cathedral
- Status: Active

Location
- Location: Viterbo, Lazio, Italy
- Interactive map of Viterbo Cathedral

Architecture
- Type: Church
- Style: Romanesque

Viterbo Cathedral (Italian: Duomo di Viterbo, or Cattedrale di San Lorenzo) is a Roman Catholic cathedral, and the principal church of the city of Viterbo, Lazio, central Italy. It is the seat of the Bishop of Viterbo and is dedicated to Saint Lawrence.

The church is an imposing Romanesque structure situated high on the hill which the city climbs, but it lacks much of the spectacular decoration with which it was originally adorned, thanks to an ill-advised sixteenth-century reconstruction.

== History ==
=== Site ===
According to legend, the cathedral was built on the site of an Etruscan temple of Hercules. Etruscan and Roman foundations can be seen on several of the buildings facing the Piazza di San Lorenzo where the cathedral is situated. Before the 12th century, a parish church dedicated to Saint Lawrence had occupied the site of the cathedral. Even as this church was constructed, the town was already spreading northwards down the hill, leaving the plaza somewhat isolated on the highest edges of town, thus restricting its attraction to the townsfolk, a disadvantage which the local bishops for years attempted to reverse by granting the cathedral special religious privileges.

=== Use as a Papal residence ===
The cathedral was at the height of its significance during the middle and end of the thirteenth century, when it and the attached Palazzo dei Papi di Viterbo was the home of the papal throne following its flight from Rome and prior to its resettlement in Avignon. Two popes were buried in the duomo: the first was Pope Alexander IV, whose tomb was bizarrely demolished during sixteenth-century renovations, and the location of his remains are now unknown; Pope John XXI is more clearly marked despite several relocations, with a handsome tombstone originally laid over him following his death in 1277 (when his study's ceiling in the papal palace attached to the cathedral suddenly collapsed into the room below due to structural weaknesses as he slept).

== Construction ==
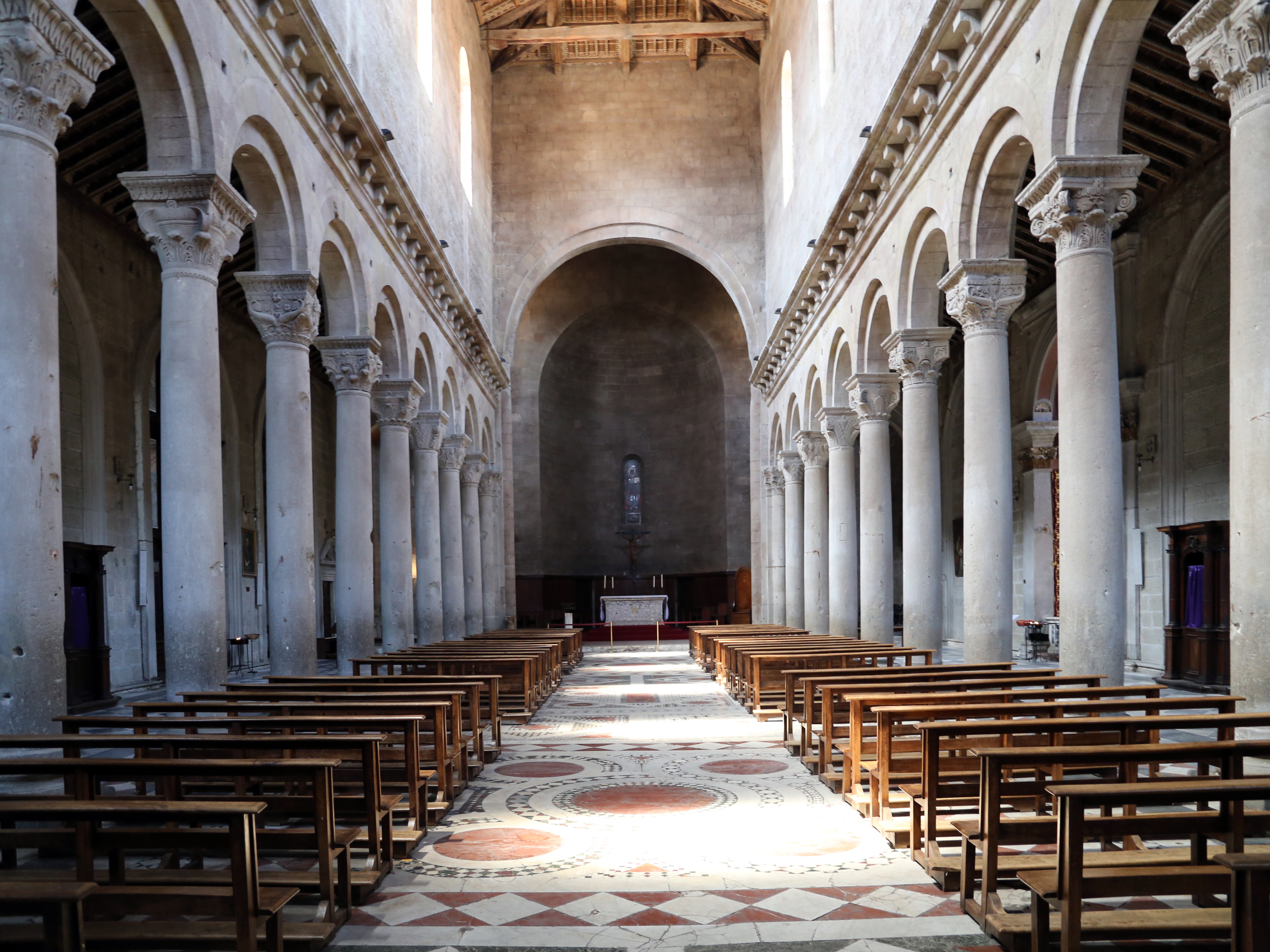
Interior

The cathedral as built in the twelfth century is east-facing and sits high on the hill with the attached Papal palace overlooking the town spread below. Its façade oddly contrasts with surrounding buildings as it is not built from local stone, but was instead constructed with imported materials during Gambarra's reconstruction. It is sparsely decorated, but at its centre is a rose window, although without any form of stained-glass decoration. There are two similar but smaller windows positioned further down over two smaller entrances aside the main entrance, again undecorated. Therefore, in total there are 33 windows. The only indication of the original decoration of the cathedral can be seen on the neighbouring campanile, which is clad in alternating bands of local white travertine and blue-green basalt stone in a manner similar to the entire Orvieto Cathedral.

=== Reconstruction ===
During the mid-16th century, the cathedral was controlled by Cardinal Gambarra, scion of a wealthy Italian family, who paid for extensive reconstruction, including the demolition of the façade, roof and central apse (including a Papal tomb). He also created new chapels and replaced much of the internal art, wood and stone decorations as well as the stained glass windows. Prominent amongst his new decorations were depictions of seafood, especially lobsters and prawns, giving the land-bound cathedral a strangely nautical look. (His name Gambarra translates as prawn from the Italian, and seafood featured heavily on his coat of arms). In 1861, a further bishop also replaced the ceiling, lowering it to disguise the intricate truss and beam work of Gambarra's creation. Many of these additions were later removed or replaced with what remains of original furnishings, especially following the Second World War, during which the cathedral and the city were heavily damaged.

== Art ==
The renovations of the cathedral along the centuries eliminated most of the original frescoes. The main works along apse are 18th-century pieces by the local painter Giovanni Francesco Romanelli and contemporaries. Only two notable early artworks survive, a Redentore benedicte (Christ giving a blessing) (1472) attributed to Gerolamo da Cremona and a 12th-century Madonna and Child by an unknown artist; the work appears to be an earlier version of a famous painting in the Basilica di Santa Maria Maggiore in Rome. It has been moved here from a local parish church. The cathedral also possesses a baptismal font (1470) constructed initially by Francesco da Ancona with later additions.

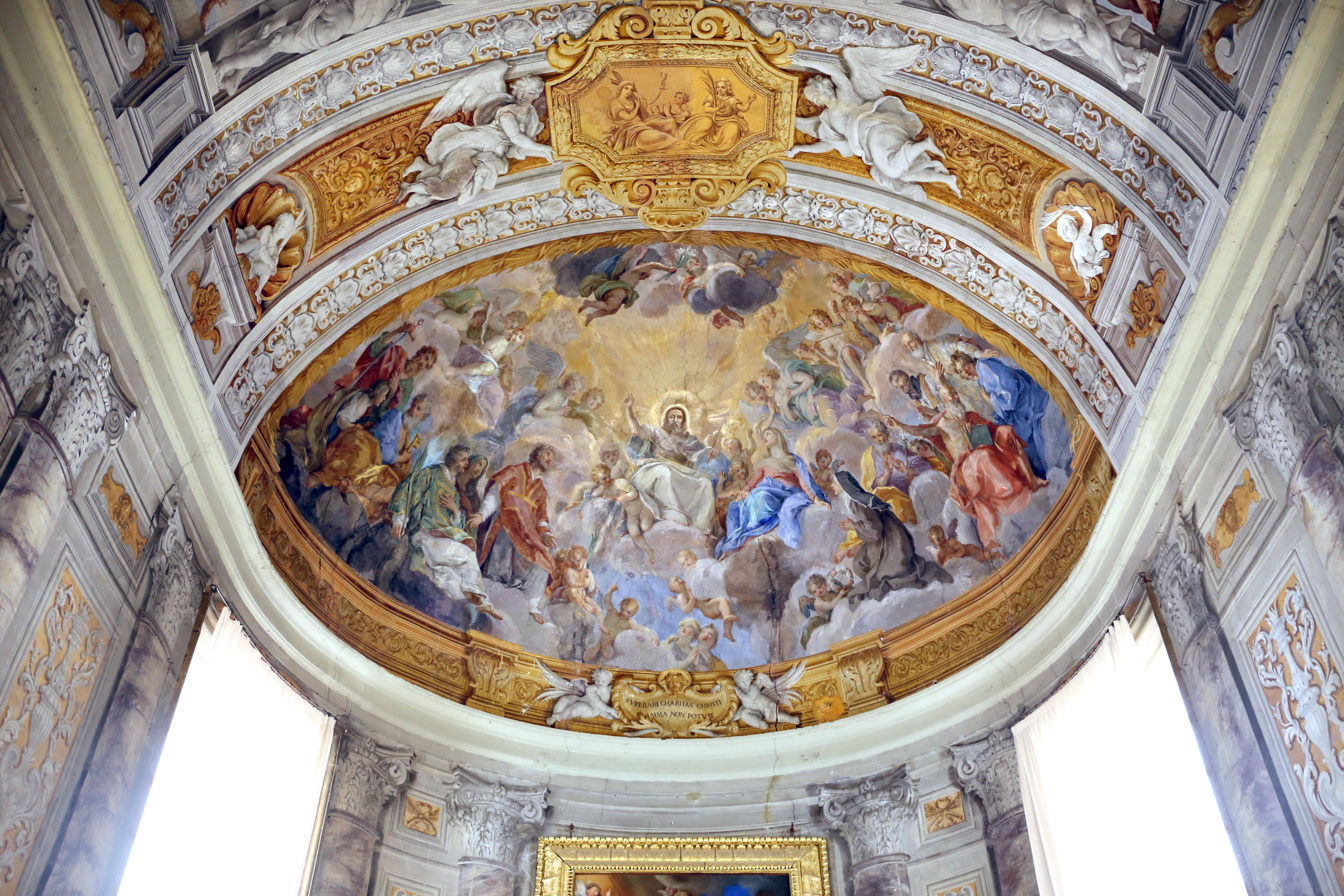
The choir of the Canons, with frescos by Giuseppe Passeri (1683)

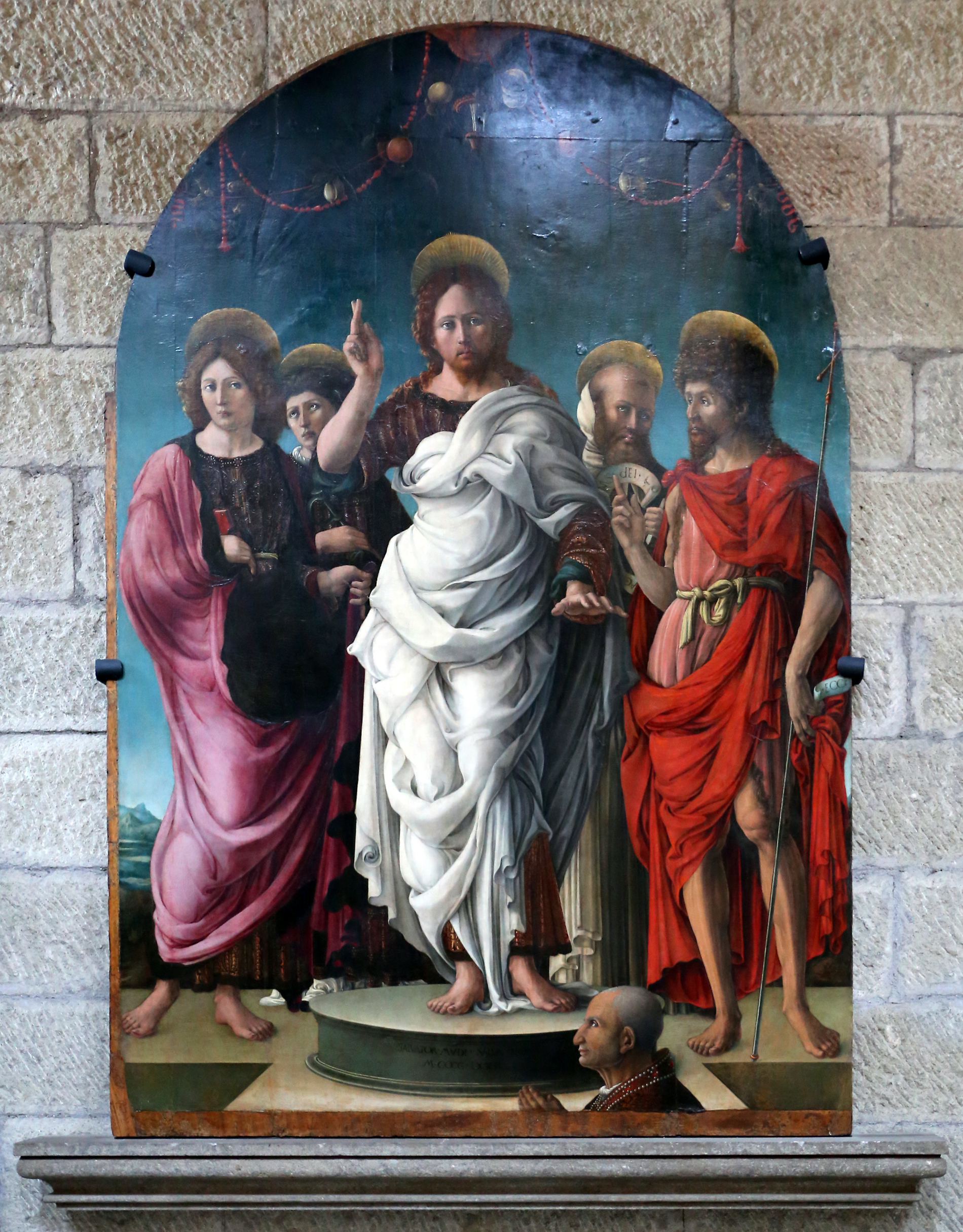
Resurrected Christ and Four Saints, by Girolamo da Cremona or Liberale da Verona

== Piazza di San Lorenzo ==
The piazza itself, although dominated by the cathedral and its campanile also possesses several other important buildings, including the town's oldest hospital in a medieval building which once housed the cathedral administration offices as well as providing a fortified townhouse for one of Italy's numerous feuding medieval families. The Etruscan foundations of this building are clearly visible from street level. To the south of the square, the House of Valentino della Pagnotta received a direct hit from an Allied bomb in World War Two but was reconstructed to original specifications. The ground floor now houses the cathedral's gift shop.

The piazza boasts several small fountains and a number of other medieval buildings, but it is dominated on its north-facing side by the Palazzo dei Papi di Viterbo, which was enlarged and reconstructed in 1266 following the Papal move to the city. The Palazzo was the original location of the initiation of the conclave tradition, taken from the Latin cum claves or with keys. The cardinals were taking so long picking a new pope following the death of Pope Clement IV in 1268 that their presence was bankrupting local businesses. This drove the infuriated local people to lock the cardinals inside the palace and to steal the roof, exposing those inside to the elements. They only returned the slates and unlocked the door once a decision had been reached.

The rest of the piazza is taken up by the ruins of the palace's loggia, half of which tumbled into the valley below around 1300 and was never repaired.
