= Gasparo Cavalieri =

His Eminence Gasparo Cavalieri
- Cardinal-Deacon of Sant'Angelo in Pescheria; Archbishop of Capua
- Church: Catholic Church

Orders
- Consecration: 9 Nov 1687 by Gasparo Carpegna

Personal details
- Born: 1648 Rome, Italy
- Died: 17 Aug 1690 (age 42)

Gasparo Cavalieri (1648–1690) was a Roman Catholic cardinal.

== Biography ==
On 9 Nov 1687, he was consecrated bishop by Gasparo Carpegna, Cardinal-Priest of San Silvestro in Capite, with Francesco Casati, Titular Archbishop of Trapezus, with Prospero Bottini, Titular Archbishop of Myra, serving as co-consecrators.

Catholic Church titles
Preceded by Michelangelo Ricci	Cardinal-Deacon of Santa Maria in Aquiro; 1686–1688	Succeeded by Giovanni Francesco Albani
Preceded by Giovanni Antonio Melzi	Archbishop of Capua; 1687–1690	Succeeded by Giacomo Cantelmo
Preceded by Fulvio Astalli	Cardinal-Deacon of San Giorgio in Velabro; 1688–1689	Succeeded by Giuseppe Renato Imperiali
Preceded by Gianfrancesco Ginetti	Cardinal-Deacon of Sant'Angelo in Pescheria; 1689–1690	Succeeded by Francesco Barberini (iuniore)
