= Orso Orsini =

Italian Roman Catholic prelate

Most Reverend Orso Orsini
- Bishop of Terni
- Church: Catholic Church
- Diocese: Diocese of Terni
- In office: 1485
- Predecessor: Giovanni Romano
- Successor: Francesco Maria Scelloni

Personal details
- Died: 1485

Orso Orsini (died 1485) was a Roman Catholic prelate who served as Bishop of Terni (1485).

In 1485, Orso Orsini was appointed by Pope Sixtus IV as Bishop of Terni. He served as Bishop of Terni until his death in 1485.

== External links and additional sources ==
- Cheney, David M. "Diocese of Terni-Narni-Amelia". Catholic-Hierarchy.org. (for Chronology of Bishops) ^{[self-published]}
- Chow, Gabriel. "Diocese of Terni-Narni-Amelia (Italy)". GCatholic.org. (for Chronology of Bishops) ^{[self-published]}

Catholic Church titles
Preceded by Giovanni Romano	Bishop of Terni; 1485	Succeeded by Francesco Maria Scelloni
