= Barnaba Mersoni =

Most Reverend Barnaba Mersoni
- Bishop of Terni
- Church: Catholic Church
- Diocese: Diocese of Terni
- In office: 1475–1481
- Predecessor: Tommaso Vincenzi
- Successor: Giovanni Romano
- Previous post: Bishop of Pesaro (1471–1475)

Personal details
- Died: 1481

Barnaba Mersoni (died 1481) was a Roman Catholic prelate who served as Bishop of Terni (1475–1481) and Bishop of Pesaro (1471–1475).

== Biography ==
On 28 March 1471, Barnaba Mersoni was appointed during the papacy of Pope Paul II as Bishop of Pesaro. On 29 May 1475, he was appointed during the papacy of Pope Sixtus IV as Bishop of Terni. He served as Bishop of Terni until his death in 1481.

== External links and additional sources ==
- Cheney, David M. "Archdiocese of Pesaro". Catholic-Hierarchy.org. (for Chronology of Bishops) ^{[self-published]}
- Chow, Gabriel. "Metropolitan Archdiocese of Pesaro (Italy)". GCatholic.org. (for Chronology of Bishops) ^{[self-published]}
- Cheney, David M. "Diocese of Terni-Narni-Amelia". Catholic-Hierarchy.org. (for Chronology of Bishops) ^{[self-published]}
- Chow, Gabriel. "Diocese of Terni-Narni-Amelia (Italy)". GCatholic.org. (for Chronology of Bishops) ^{[self-published]}

Catholic Church titles
Preceded by	Bishop of Pesaro; 1471–1475	Succeeded by Tommaso Vincenzi
Preceded by Tommaso Vincenzi	Bishop of Terni; 1475–1481	Succeeded by Giovanni Romano
