= Nicolò Nardini =

17th-century Italian Catholic bishop

Most Reverend Nicolò Nardini
- Bishop of Acquapendente
- Church: Catholic Church
- Diocese: Diocese of Acquapendente
- In office: 1696–1697
- Predecessor: Alessandro Fedele
- Successor: Ambrosio Angelini

Orders
- Consecration: 3 Jun 1696 by Bandino Panciatici

Personal details
- Born: 26 Dec 1678 Capranica, Lazio, Italy
- Died: Jul 1697 (age 60) Acquapendente, Italy

Nicolò Nardini (1678–1697) was a Roman Catholic prelate who served as Bishop of Acquapendente (1696–1697).

== Biography ==
Nicolò Nardini was born in Capranica, Lazio, Italy, and ordained a priest on 26 December 1678. On 21 May 1696, he was appointed during the papacy of Pope Innocent XI as Bishop of Acquapendente. On 21 May 1696, he was consecrated bishop by Bandino Panciatici, Cardinal-Priest of San Pancrazio, with Prospero Bottini, Titular Archbishop of Myra, and Sperello Sperelli, Bishop of Terni, serving as co-consecrators. He served as Bishop of Acquapendente until his death in July 1697.

== External links and additional sources ==
- Cheney, David M. "Diocese of Acquapendente". Catholic-Hierarchy.org. (for Chronology of Bishops) ^{[self-published]}
- Chow, Gabriel. "Titular Episcopal See of Acquapendente". GCatholic.org. (for Chronology of Bishops) ^{[self-published]}

Catholic Church titles
Preceded by Alessandro Fedele	Bishop of Acquapendente; 1696–1697	Succeeded by Ambrosio Angelini
