= Giovanni Romano =

Italian Roman Catholic prelate

Most Reverend Giovanni Romano
- Bishop of Terni
- Church: Catholic Church
- Diocese: Diocese of Terni
- In office: 1481–1485
- Predecessor: Barnaba Mersoni
- Successor: Orso Orsini

Personal details
- Died: 1485 Terni, Italy

Giovanni Romano (died 1485) was a Roman Catholic prelate who served as Bishop of Terni (1481–1485).

Romano was ordained a priest in the Order of Preachers. In 1481, he was appointed by Pope Sixtus IV as Bishop of Terni. He served as Bishop of Terni until his death in 1485.

== External links and additional sources ==
- Cheney, David M. "Diocese of Terni-Narni-Amelia". Catholic-Hierarchy.org. (for Chronology of Bishops) ^{[self-published]}
- Chow, Gabriel. "Diocese of Terni-Narni-Amelia (Italy)". GCatholic.org. (for Chronology of Bishops) ^{[self-published]}

Catholic Church titles
| Preceded by Barnaba Mersoni | Bishop of Terni; 1481–1485 | Succeeded by Orso Orsini |
