= Giambattista Febei =

17th-century Italian Catholic bishop

Most Reverend Giambattista Febei
- Bishop of Acquapendente
- Church: Catholic Church
- Diocese: Diocese of Acquapendente
- In office: 1683–1688
- Predecessor: Gian Lorenzo Castiglioni
- Successor: Alessandro Fedele

Orders
- Ordination: 11 July 1683
- Consecration: 25 July 1683 by Galeazzo Marescotti

Personal details
- Born: 1623 Orvieto, Italy
- Died: 14 April 1688 (aged 64–65) Acquapendente, Italy

Giambattista Febei (1623 – 14 April 1688) was a Roman Catholic prelate who served as Bishop of Acquapendente (1683–1688).

== Biography ==
Giambattista Febei was born in Orvieto, Italy in 1623 and ordained a priest on 11 July 1683. On 12 July 1683, he was appointed during the papacy of Pope Innocent XI as Bishop of Acquapendente. On 25 July 1683, he was consecrated bishop by Galeazzo Marescotti, Bishop of Tivoli, with Francesco Casati, Titular Archbishop of Trapezus, and Prospero Bottini, Titular Archbishop of Myra, serving as co-consecrators. He served as Bishop of Acquapendente until his death on 14 April 1688.

== External links and additional sources ==
- Cheney, David M. "Diocese of Acquapendente". Catholic-Hierarchy.org. (for Chronology of Bishops) ^{[self-published]}
- Chow, Gabriel. "Titular Episcopal See of Acquapendente". GCatholic.org. (for Chronology of Bishops) ^{[self-published]}

Catholic Church titles
Preceded by Gian Lorenzo Castiglioni	Bishop of Acquapendente; 1683–1688	Succeeded by Alessandro Fedele
