= Ambrosio Angelini =

18th-century Italian Catholic bishop

Most Reverend Ambrosio Angelini
- Bishop of Acquapendente
- Church: Catholic Church
- Diocese: Diocese of Acquapendente
- In office: 1697–1710
- Predecessor: Nicolò Nardini
- Successor: Bernardino Egidio Recchi

Orders
- Consecration: 24 November 1697 by Pier Matteo Petrucci

Personal details
- Born: 14 April 1636 San Constance, Italy
- Died: 9 December 1710 (age 74) Acquapendente, Italy

Ambrosio Angelini (1636–1710) was a Roman Catholic prelate who served as Bishop of Acquapendente (1697–1710).

== Biography ==
Ambrosio Angelini was born on 14 April 1636 in the small city of San Constance, Italy.

On 20 November 1697, during the papacy of Pope Innocent XII, he was appointed Bishop of Acquapendente.

He received episcopal consecration on 24 November 1697 from Pier Matteo Petrucci, Cardinal-Priest of San Marcello, with Prospero Bottini, Titular Archbishop of Myra, and Giuseppe Felice Barlacci, Bishop Emeritus of Narni, acting as co-consecrators.

Angelini remained in office as Bishop of Acquapendente until his death on 9 December 1710.

== External links and additional sources ==
- Cheney, David M. "Diocese of Acquapendente". Catholic-Hierarchy.org. (for Chronology of Bishops) ^{[self-published]}
- Chow, Gabriel. "Titular Episcopal See of Acquapendente". GCatholic.org. (for Chronology of Bishops) ^{[self-published]}

Catholic Church titles
Preceded by Nicolò Nardini	Bishop of Acquapendente; 1697–1710	Succeeded by Bernardino Egidio Recchi
