= Francesco Maria Scelloni =

Italian Roman Catholic prelate

Most Reverend Francesco Maria Scelloni
- Bishop of Terni
- Church: Catholic Church
- Diocese: Diocese of Terni
- In office: 1491-1494
- Predecessor: Orso Orsini
- Successor: Giovanni di Fonsalida
- Previous posts: Bishop of Terni (1472); Bishop of Viterbo e Tuscania (1472–1491)

Francesco Maria Scelloni, O.F.M. was a Roman Catholic prelate who served as Bishop of Viterbo e Tuscania (1472–1491) and twice as Bishop of Terni (1472 and 1491–1494).

== Biography ==
Francesco Maria Scelloni was ordained a priest in the Order of Friars Minor. On 14 February 1472, he was appointed by Pope Sixtus IV as Bishop of Terni. His position was short-lived as on 31 August 1472, he was appointed by Pope Sixtus IV as Bishop of Viterbo e Tuscania. In 1491, he was again appointed by Pope Innocent VIII as Bishop of Terni. It is uncertain how long he served although the next bishop of record was Giovanni di Fonsalida who was appointed on 1 October 1494.

== External links and additional sources ==
- Cheney, David M. "Diocese of Terni-Narni-Amelia". Catholic-Hierarchy.org. (for Chronology of Bishops) ^{[self-published]}
- Chow, Gabriel. "Diocese of Terni-Narni-Amelia (Italy)". GCatholic.org. (for Chronology of Bishops) ^{[self-published]}
- Cheney, David M. "Diocese of Viterbo". Catholic-Hierarchy.org. (for Chronology of Bishops) ^{[self-published]}
- Chow, Gabriel. "Diocese of Viterbo (Italy)". GCatholic.org. (for Chronology of Bishops) ^{[self-published]}

Catholic Church titles
Preceded by Ludovico Antoniis	Bishop of Terni (1st time); 1472	Succeeded by Tommaso Vincenzi
Preceded by	Bishop of Viterbo e Tuscania; 1472–1491	Succeeded by
Preceded by Orso Orsini	Bishop of Terni (2nd time); 1491-1494	Succeeded by Giovanni di Fonsalida
