= Manoel Pereira =

Most Reverend Manoel Pereira
- Bishop of São Sebastião do Rio de Janeiro
- Church: Catholic Church
- Diocese: Diocese of São Sebastião do Rio de Janeiro
- In office: 1675–1680
- Predecessor: Manuel Pessoa de Figueiredo
- Successor: José de Barros Alarcão

Orders
- Ordination: by César d'Estrées
- Consecration: 10 Jan 1677

Personal details
- Born: 22 Jan 1625 Lisbon, Portugal
- Died: 6 Jan 1688 (age 62)

Manoel Pereira, O.P. (1625–1688) was a Roman Catholic prelate who served as Bishop of São Sebastião do Rio de Janeiro (1675–1680). and Secretary of State of Portugal (1680-1683).

== Biography ==
Manoel Pereira was born in Lisbon, Portugal on 22 Jan 1625 and ordained a priest in the Order of Preachers.
On 16 Nov 1676, he was appointed during the papacy of Pope Innocent XI as Bishop of São Sebastião do Rio de Janeiro. On 10 Jan 1677, he was consecrated bishop by César d'Estrées, Bishop of Laon, with Francesco Casati, Titular Archbishop of Trapezus, and Michael Angelus Broglia, Bishop of Vercelli, serving as co-consecrators.

=== Political career ===
In 1680, he was appointed Secretary of State of Portugal (a position equivalent to that of prime minister) to King Pedro II.
For this, he resigned as Bishop of Rio de Janeiro in 1680, before having taken office. He was a member of the board of the Council of the Three Estates (Junta dos Três Estados). He died on 6 Jan 1688.

== Episcopal succession ==
Episcopal succession of Manoel Pereira

While bishop, he was the principal co-consecrator of:

- Juan Tomás de Rocaberti, Archbishop of Valencia (1677);
- Domingos de Gusmão, Bishop of Leiria (1678);
- João da Madre de Deus Araújo, Archbishop of São Salvador da Bahia (1682);
- Valerio de São Raimundo, Bishop of Elvas (1683);
- João de Sousa, Bishop of Porto (1684);
- Simão da Gama, Bishop of Faro (1685);
- Alberto de São Gonçalo da Silva, Archbishop of Goa (1686);
- Manoel da Ressurreição, Archbishop of São Salvador da Bahia (1687);
- Victorino do Porto, Bishop of Santiago de Cabo Verde (1687); and
- João Franco de Oliveira, Bishop of Angola e Congo (1687).

Catholic Church titles
Preceded by Manuel Pessoa de Figueiredo	Bishop of São Sebastião do Rio de Janeiro; 1675–1680	Succeeded by José de Barros Alarcão
Political offices
Preceded by Luís de Vasconcelos e Sousa	Secretary of State of Portugal (Prime Minister); 1680–1683	Succeeded by Diogo de Mendonça Corte-Real
