= Giovanni di Fonsalida =

Italian Roman Catholic prelate

Most Reverend Giovanni di Fonsalida
- Bishop of Terni
- Church: Catholic Church
- Diocese: Diocese of Terni
- In office: 1494–1498
- Predecessor: Francesco Maria Scelloni
- Successor: Francisco Lloris y de Borja

Personal details
- Died: 1498 Terni, Italy

Giovanni di Fonsalida (died 1498) was a Roman Catholic prelate who served as Bishop of Terni (1494–1498).

== Biography ==
On 1 October 1494, Giovanni di Fonsalida was appointed by Pope Alexander VI as Bishop of Terni. He served as Bishop of Terni until his death in 1498.

== External links and additional sources ==
- Cheney, David M. "Diocese of Terni-Narni-Amelia". Catholic-Hierarchy.org. (for Chronology of Bishops) ^{[self-published]}
- Chow, Gabriel. "Diocese of Terni-Narni-Amelia (Italy)". GCatholic.org. (for Chronology of Bishops) ^{[self-published]}

Catholic Church titles
Preceded by Francesco Maria Scelloni	Bishop of Terni; 1494–1498	Succeeded by Francisco Lloris y de Borja
