= Lorenzo Gherardi =

18th-century Italian Catholic bishop

Most Reverend Lorenzo Gherardi
- Bishop of Recanati e Loreto
- Church: Catholic Church
- Diocese: Diocese of Recanati
- In office: 1693–1727
- Predecessor: Raimondo Ferretti
- Successor: Benedetto Bussi

Orders
- Consecration: 14 June 1693 by Galeazzo Marescotti

Personal details
- Born: 10 August 1645 Monte Alboddo, Italy
- Died: 5 April 1727 (age 81)

Lorenzo Gherardi (1645–1727) was a Roman Catholic prelate who served as Bishop of Recanati e Loreto (1693–1727).

== Biography ==
Lorenzo Gherardi was born in Monte Alboddo, Italy on 10 August 1645. On 8 June 1693, he was appointed during the papacy of Pope Innocent XII as Bishop of Recanati e Loreto. On 14 June 1693, he was consecrated bishop by Galeazzo Marescotti, Cardinal-Priest of Santi Quirico e Giulitta, with Prospero Bottini, Titular Archbishop of Myra, and Sperello Sperelli, Bishop of Terni, serving as co-consecrators. He served as Bishop of Recanati e Loreto until his death on 5 April 1727.

== External links and additional sources ==
- Cheney, David M. "Diocese of Macerata–Tolentino–Recanati–Cingoli–Treia". Catholic-Hierarchy.org. (for Chronology of Bishops) ^{[self-published]}
- Chow, Gabriel. "Diocese of Macerata–Tolentino–Recanati–Cingoli–Treia (Italy)". GCatholic.org. (for Chronology of Bishops) ^{[self-published]}

Catholic Church titles
Preceded by Raimondo Ferretti	Bishop of Recanati e Loreto; 1693–1727	Succeeded by Benedetto Bussi
