= Raimondo Ferretti =

17th and 18th-century Italian Catholic bishop

Most Reverend Raimondo Ferretti
- Archbishop of Ravenna
- Church: Catholic Church
- Archdiocese: Archdiocese of Ravenna
- In office: 1692–1719
- Predecessor: Fabio Guinigi
- Successor: Girolamo Crispi
- Previous post: Bishop of Recanati e Loreto (1690–1692)

Orders
- Ordination: 10 March 1674
- Consecration: 6 August 1690 by Paluzzo Paluzzi Altieri Degli Albertoni

Personal details
- Born: 20 November 1650 Ancona, Italy
- Died: 24 March 1719 (age 68) Ravenna, Italy

Raimondo Ferretti (1650–1719) was a Roman Catholic prelate who served as Archbishop of Ravenna (1692–1719) and Bishop of Recanati e Loreto (1690–1692).

== Biography ==
Raimondo Ferretti was born in Ancona, Italy in 1650 and ordained a priest on 10 March 1674. On 10 July 1690, he was appointed during the papacy of Pope Alexander VIII as Bishop of Recanati e Loreto. On 6 August 1690, he was consecrated bishop by Paluzzo Paluzzi Altieri Degli Albertoni, Cardinal-Bishop of Sabina, with Prospero Bottini, Titular Archbishop of Myra, and Nicolò d'Arcano, Bishop of Comacchio, serving as co-consecrators. On 9 January 1692, he was appointed during the papacy of Pope Innocent XII as Archbishop of Ravenna. He served as Archbishop of Ravenna until his death on 24 March 1719.

== External links and additional sources ==
- Cheney, David M. "Diocese of Macerata–Tolentino–Recanati–Cingoli–Treia". Catholic-Hierarchy.org. (for Chronology of Bishops) ^{[self-published]}
- Chow, Gabriel. "Diocese of Macerata–Tolentino–Recanati–Cingoli–Treia (Italy)". GCatholic.org. (for Chronology of Bishops) ^{[self-published]}
- Cheney, David M. "Archdiocese of Ravenna-Cervia". Catholic-Hierarchy.org. (for Chronology of Bishops) ^{[self-published]}
- Chow, Gabriel. "Metropolitan Archdiocese of Ravenna–Cervia (Italy)". GCatholic.org. (for Chronology of Bishops) ^{[self-published]}

Catholic Church titles
Preceded by Guarnerio Guarnieri	Bishop of Recanati e Loreto; 1690–1692	Succeeded by Lorenzo Gherardi
Preceded by Fabio Guinigi	Archbishop of Ravenna; 1692–1719	Succeeded by Girolamo Crispi
