= Tommaso Vincenzi =

Italian Roman Catholic prelate

Most Reverend Tommaso Vincenzi
- Bishop of Pesaro
- Church: Catholic Church
- Diocese: Diocese of Pesaro
- In office: 1475–1478
- Predecessor: Barnaba Mersoni
- Successor: Lorenzo Capodiferro
- Previous post: Bishop of Terni (1472–1475)

Personal details
- Died: 8 September 1478

Tommaso Vincenzi (died 1478) was a Roman Catholic prelate who served as Bishop of Pesaro (1475–1478) and Bishop of Terni (1472–1475).

== Biography ==
On 31 August 1472, Tommaso Vincenzi was appointed during the papacy of Pope Sixtus IV as Bishop of Terni. On 29 May 1475, he was appointed during the papacy of Pope Sixtus IV as Bishop of Pesaro. He served as Bishop of Pesaro until his death on 8 September 1478.

== External links and additional sources ==
- Cheney, David M. "Diocese of Terni-Narni-Amelia". Catholic-Hierarchy.org. (for Chronology of Bishops) ^{[self-published]}
- Chow, Gabriel. "Diocese of Terni-Narni-Amelia (Italy)". GCatholic.org. (for Chronology of Bishops) ^{[self-published]}
- Cheney, David M. "Archdiocese of Pesaro". Catholic-Hierarchy.org. (for Chronology of Bishops) ^{[self-published]}
- Chow, Gabriel. "Metropolitan Archdiocese of Pesaro (Italy)". GCatholic.org. (for Chronology of Bishops) ^{[self-published]}

Catholic Church titles
Preceded by Francesco Maria Scelloni	Bishop of Terni; 1472–1475	Succeeded by Barnaba Mersoni
Preceded by Barnaba Mersoni	Bishop of Pesaro; 1475–1478	Succeeded by Lorenzo Capodiferro
