= Luís de Vasconcelos e Sousa, 3rd Count of Castelo Melhor =

Portuguese count (1662–1667)

His Lordship The Count of Castelo Melhor
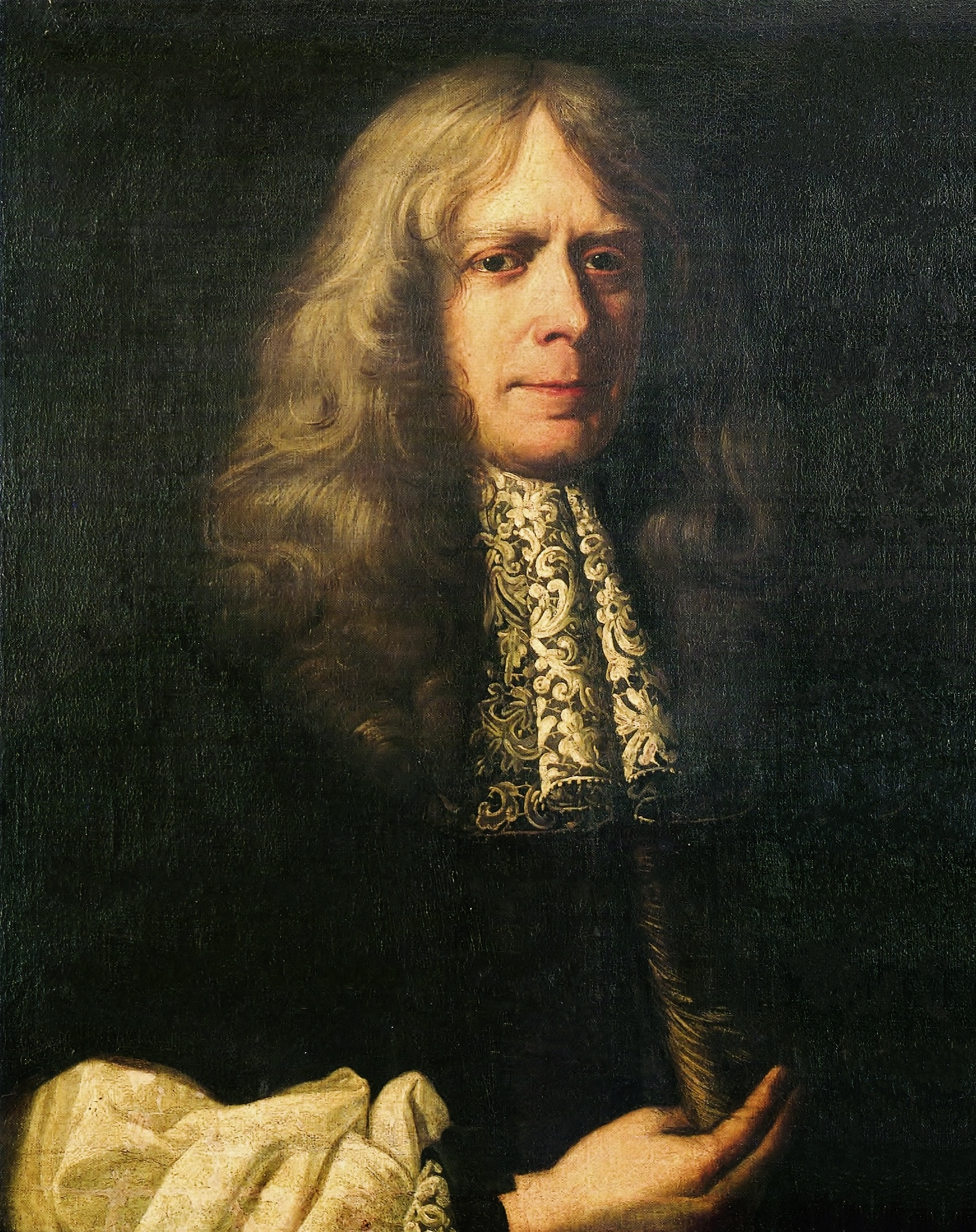

Secretary of State of the Kingdom of Portugal
- In office 12 July 1662 – 9 September 1667
- Monarch: Afonso VI
- Preceded by: Gaspar Severim de Faria
- Succeeded by: Manoel Pereira

Captain-Major of Santa Maria Island
- In office 1667–1720
- Monarchs: Afonso VI; Peter II; John V
- Preceded by: Joana de Meneses
- Succeeded by: Afonso de Vasconcelos

Personal details
- Born: 1635 Kingdom of Portugal
- Died: 1720 (aged 84–85) Santa Maria, Azores, Kingdom of Portugal

Military service
- Allegiance: Kingdom of Portugal
- Years of service: 1657-1659
- Battles/wars: Portuguese Restoration War

D. Luís de Vasconcelos e Sousa, 3rd Count of Castelo Melhor (1635 – 15 August 1720) was a Portuguese politician and Secretary of State of Portugal (Prime minister).

== Career ==
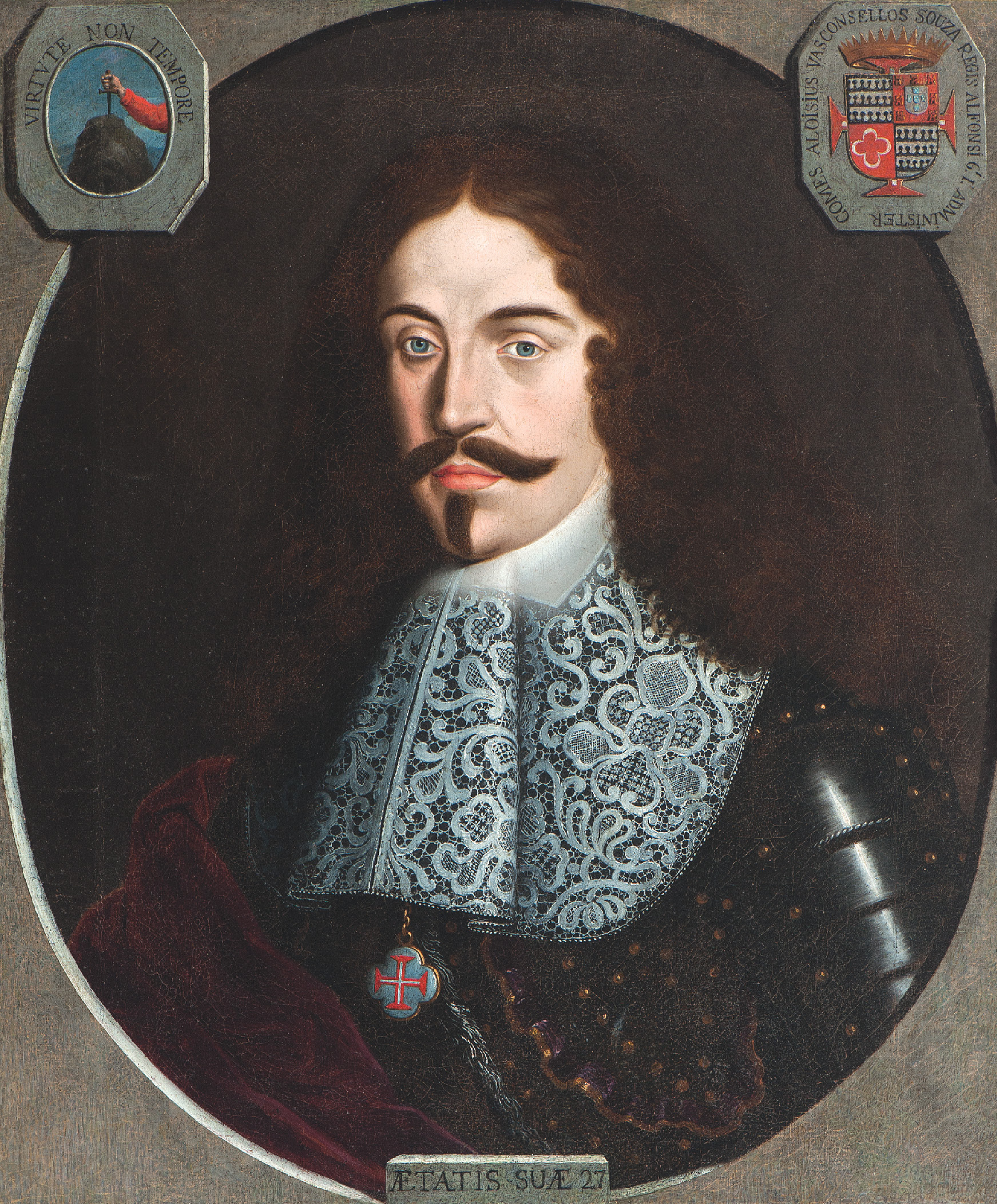
Portrait at the age of 27, by Feliciano de Almeida, 1663.

Castelo Melhor was a Portuguese royal favourite who, as an effective governor of Portugal from 1662 to 1667 during the reign of Afonso VI, was responsible for the successful prosecution of the war against Spain, which led to Spanish recognition of Portugal's new ruling dynasty in 1668.

Shortly after Afonso VI's coming-of-age in 1662, Castelo Melhor saw an opportunity to gain power at court when the Afonso's mother, Queen-Regent Luisa, sent away one of the king's unruly favorites. Melhor managed to convince the angry king to take control of the throne and send his mother to a convent.

The King appointed Castelo Melhor his secret notary (escrivão da puridade), a position in which the favourite was able to exercise the functions of first minister.

Castelo Melhor overcame the difficulties which had hitherto beset Portugal in the war against Spain, reorganizing the troops (now reinforced by an English contingent by virtue of the English king Charles II's marriage to Catherine of Braganza) and entrusting their command to competent generals. Consequently, the Portuguese Restoration War entered a victorious phase for Portugal (1663–65) and Spain began peace negotiations.

Agreement proved difficult to attain and meanwhile the internal political situation in Portugal deteriorated. Castelo Melhor and his Francophile party were losing ground to the Anglophile party. The king was obliged to dismiss Castelo Melhor on 9 September 1667, in a palace coup organized by the king's wife Maria Francisca of Nemours and brother Pedro. Shortly afterwards, the king himself was also deprived of power.

Castelo Melhor went into exile in Paris and then London, but in 1685 he was permitted to return to Portugal and, two years after that, to court. On the accession of John V (1706), he was appointed a councillor of state and he continued to occupy a position of distinction until his death in 1720.

He was also the 12th captain-major of Santa Maria Island in the Azores from 1667 to 1720.

== Sources ==
- Ames, Glenn Joseph (2000). Renascent Empire?: The House of Braganza and the Quest for Stability in Portuguese Monsoon Asia, ca. 1640-1683. Amsterdam: Amsterdam University Press. ISBN 9053563822.
- Birmingham, David (2003). A Concise History of Portugal. Cambridge University Press. pp. 50–51. ISBN 978-0-521-83004-1.
- de Faria, Ana Leal; Monteiro, Nuno Gonçalo (2021). Castelo Melhor e os Seus Tempos (1635-1720) (PDF) (in Portuguese). Centro de História da Universidade de Lisboa.
- Livermore, H.V. (1969). A New History of Portugal. Cambridge University Press. ISBN 9780521095716.
- Marques, Antonio Henrique R. de Oliveira (1976). History of Portugal. ISBN 978-0-231-08353-9.
- McMurdo, Edward (1889). The history of Portugal, from the Commencement of the Monarchy to the Reign of Alfonso III. London: Sampson Low, Marston, Searle, & Rivington.
- Newitt, M. D. D (2005). A history of Portuguese Overseas Expansion, 1400-1668. New York: Routledge.
- Stephens, H. Morse (1891). The Story of Portugal. New York: G. P. Putnam's Sons.
