= Alessandro Croce =

18th-century Italian Catholic bishop

Most Reverend Alessandro Croce
- Bishop of Cremona
- Church: Catholic Church
- Diocese: Diocese of Cremona
- In office: 1697–1704
- Predecessor: Lodovico Septala
- Successor: Carlo Ottaviano Guasco

Orders
- Ordination: 19 September 1676
- Consecration: 8 December 1697 by Baldassare Cenci (seniore)

Personal details
- Born: 3 July 1650 Milan, Italy
- Died: 23 September 1704 (age 54) Cremona, Italy

Alessandro Croce (1650–1704) was a Roman Catholic prelate who served as Bishop of Cremona (1697–1704).

== Biography ==
Alessandro Croce was born in Milan, Italy on 3 July 1650 and ordained a priest on 19 September 1676. On 2 December 1697, he was appointed during the papacy of Pope Innocent XII as Bishop of Cremona. On 8 December 1697, he was consecrated bishop by Baldassare Cenci (seniore), Archbishop of Fermo, with Prospero Bottini, Titular Archbishop of Myra, and Sperello Sperelli, Bishop of Terni, serving as co-consecrators. He served as Bishop of Cremona until his death on 23 September 1704.

== External links and additional sources ==
- Cheney, David M. "Diocese of Cremona". Catholic-Hierarchy.org. (for Chronology of Bishops) ^{[self-published]}
- Chow, Gabriel. "Diocese of Cremona (Italy)". GCatholic.org. (for Chronology of Bishops) ^{[self-published]}

Catholic Church titles
Preceded by Lodovico Septala	Bishop of Cremona; 1697–1704	Succeeded by Carlo Ottaviano Guasco
