= Lodovico Magni =

17th-century Roman Catholic bishop

Most Reverend Lodovico Magni
- Bishop of Acquapendente
- Church: Catholic Church
- Diocese: Diocese of Acquapendente
- In office: 1674–168
- Predecessor: Nicolò Leti
- Successor: Gian Lorenzo Castiglioni

Orders
- Consecration: 7 Oct 1674 by Gasparo Carpegna

Personal details
- Born: 1618 Milan, Italy
- Died: 1680 (age 62)

Lodovico Magni, O.F.M. Conv. (1618–1680) was a Roman Catholic prelate who served as Bishop of Acquapendente (1674–1680).

== Biography ==
Lodovico Magni was born in 1618 in Milan and ordained a priest in the Order of Friars Minor Conventual. On 1 Oct 1674, he was appointed during the papacy of Pope Clement X as Bishop of Acquapendente. On 7 Oct 1674, he was consecrated bishop by Gasparo Carpegna, Cardinal-Priest of San Silvestro in Capite. He served as Bishop of Acquapendente until his death in 1680.

While bishop, he was the principal co-consecrator of Nicola Oliva, Bishop of Cortona (1677); and Giovanni Borgoforte, Bishop of Nona (1677).

== External links and additional sources ==
- Cheney, David M. "Diocese of Acquapendente". Catholic-Hierarchy.org. (for Chronology of Bishops) ^{[self-published]}
- Chow, Gabriel. "Titular Episcopal See of Acquapendente". GCatholic.org. (for Chronology of Bishops) ^{[self-published]}

Catholic Church titles
Preceded by Nicolò Leti	Bishop of Acquapendente; 1674–1680	Succeeded by Gian Lorenzo Castiglioni
