= Baldassare Cenci (iuniore) =

Italian cardinal

His Eminence Baldassare Cenci
- Cardinal-Priest of Santa Maria in Ara Coeli
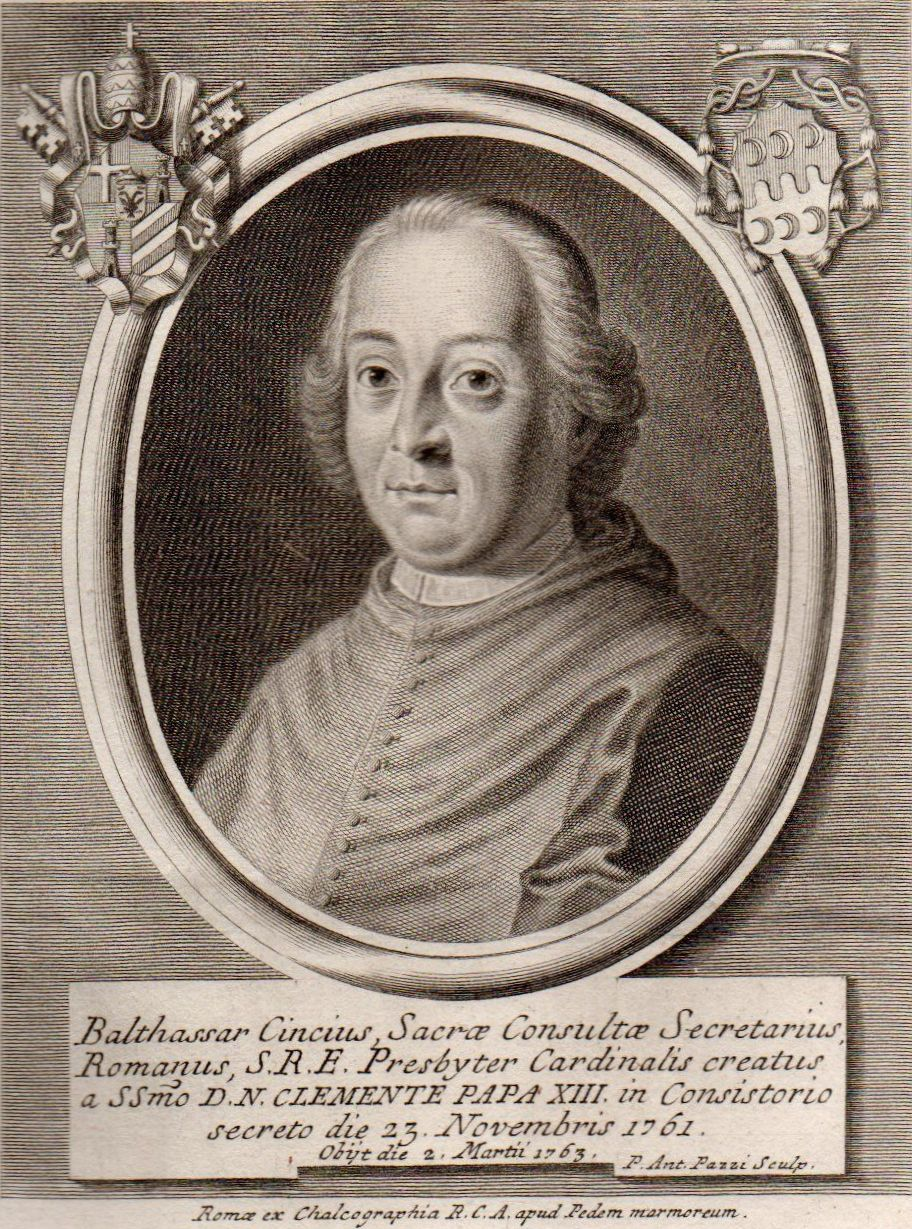
- Portrait of cardinal Baldassare Cenci
- Church: Catholic Church

Personal details
- Born: November 1, 1710 Rome, Italy
- Died: March 2, 1763 (age 53) Nettuno, Italy

Baldassare Cenci, iuniore (1710–1763) was a Roman Catholic cardinal.

== Biography ==
Baldassare Cenci was born on November 1, 1710, in Rome, the fifth of seven children born to Tiberio Cenci and Eleonora Maddalena Costaguti. His uncle is cardinal Baldassare Cenci (seniore).

Cenci died of apoplexy on March 2, 1763, in Nettuno, Italy.

Catholic Church titles
Preceded by Johann Theodor von Bayern	Cardinal-Priest of Santa Maria in Ara Coeli; 1762–1763	Succeeded by Niccolò Oddi
