= Pompeo Mignucci =

Roman Catholic Prelate

Most Reverend Pompeo Mignucci
- Archbishop (Personal Title) of Acquapendente
- Church: Catholic Church
- In office: 1650–1654
- Successor: Nicolò Leti
- Previous post: Archbishop of Dubrovnik (1617–1650)

Orders
- Consecration: 29 September 1647 by Marcantonio Franciotti

Personal details
- Born: 1597 Offida, Italy
- Died: October 1654 (age 57) Acquapendente, Italy

Pompeo Mignucci, O.S.H. (1597–1654) was a Roman Catholic prelate who served as Archbishop (Personal Title) of Acquapendente (1650–1654) and Archbishop of Dubrovnik (1617–1650).

== Biography ==
Pompeo Mignucci was born in Offida, Italy in 1597 and ordained a priest in the Order of Saint Jerome. On 22 August 1617, he was appointed during the papacy of Pope Paul V as Archbishop of Dubrovnik. On 29 September 1647, he was consecrated bishop by Marcantonio Franciotti, Cardinal-Priest of Santa Maria della Pace, with Ranuccio Scotti Douglas, Bishop of Borgo San Donnino, and Alessandro Vittrici, Bishop of Alatri, serving as co-consecrators. On 10 January 1650, he was appointed during the papacy of Pope Innocent X as Archbishop (Personal Title) of Acquapendente. He served as Archbishop (Personal Title) of Acquapendente until his death in October 1654.

While bishop, he was the principal co-consecrator of Marin Ibrišimović, Bishop of Beograd (1647).

== External links and additional sources ==
- Cheney, David M. "Diocese of Dubrovnik (Ragusa)". Catholic-Hierarchy.org. (for Chronology of Bishops) ^{[self-published]}
- Chow, Gabriel. "Diocese of Dubrovnik (Croatia)". GCatholic.org. (for Chronology of Bishops) ^{[self-published]}
- Cheney, David M. "Diocese of Acquapendente". Catholic-Hierarchy.org. (for Chronology of Bishops) ^{[self-published]}
- Chow, Gabriel. "Titular Episcopal See of Acquapendente". GCatholic.org. (for Chronology of Bishops) ^{[self-published]}

Catholic Church titles
Preceded by Bernadino Larizza	Archbishop of Dubrovnik; 1617–1650	Succeeded by Francesco Perotti
Preceded by	Archbishop (Personal Title) of Acquapendente; 1650–1654	Succeeded by Nicolò Leti
