= Diocese of Viterbo =

Latin Catholic ecclesiastical jurisdiction in Italy

Diocese of Viterbo Dioecesis Viterbiensis

Catholic
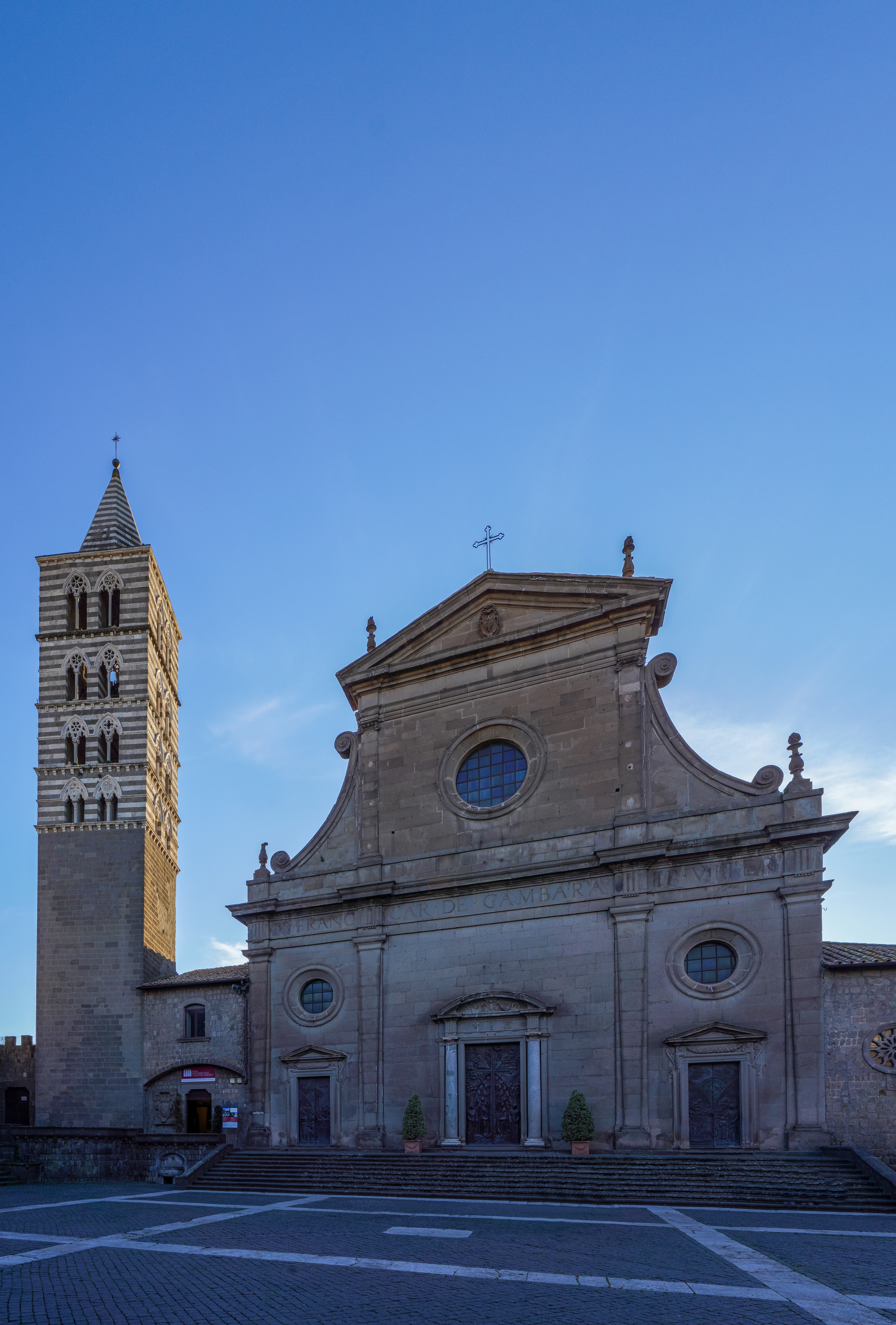
- Viterbo Cathedral, Viterbo

Location
- Country: Italy
- Ecclesiastical province: Immediately exempt to the Holy See

Statistics
- Area: 2,161 km^{2} (834 sq mi)
- Population: Total; Catholics: (as of 2014); 181,116; 174,400 (est.) (96.3%)
- Parishes: 96

Information
- Denomination: Catholic Church
- Sui iuris church: Latin Church
- Rite: Roman Rite
- Established: 6th century
- Cathedral: Basilica Cattedrale di S. Lorenzo Martire (Viterbo)
- Co-cathedral: Basilica Cattedrale del S. Sepolcro (Acquapendente); Basilica di S. Maria Maggiore (Tuscania); Concattedrale di S. Nicola (Bagnoregio)
- Secular priests: 112 (diocesan); 61 (religious Orders)

Current leadership
- Pope: Leo XIV
- Bishop: Orazio Francesco Piazza
- Bishops emeritus: Lino Fumagalli

Website
- www.webdiocesi.chiesacattolica.it

The Diocese of Viterbo (Latin: Dioecesis Viterbiensis) is a Latin Church ecclesiastical territory or diocese of the Catholic Church in central Italy. From the 12th century, the official name of the diocese was the Diocese of Viterbo e Tuscania. In 1986, several dioceses were combined, and the title was changed to "Diocese of Viterbo, Acquapendente, Bagnoregio, Montefiascone, Tuscania and San Martino al Monte Cimino"; in 1991 the name was shortened to "Diocese of Viterbo".

The diocese has always been exempt, immediately subject to the Holy See, not belonging to any ecclesiastical province. The diocesan cathedral is the Cattedrale di San Lorenzo, in the episcopal see of Viterbo.

== History ==
The name of Viterbo occurs for the first time in the 8th century, under Pope Zachary, when it was a village tributary to Toscanella, in Lombard Tuscany (Tuscia Langobardorum) on the Via Cassia. Charlemagne gave the pope all this Tuscan territory in feudal tenure, the imperial authority over it being still represented by a sculdascio (feudal sheriff) and later by a count.

=== Toscanella ===
Bishop Maurus is the first known bishop (649) of Toscanella. Among the successors of Maurus was Virbonus, to whom Pope Leo IV addressed a bull on 23 February 852, determining the boundaries of the diocese. In 876, Bishop Joannes was one of the legates of Pope John VIII at the council of Pontigny, and carried the imperial insignia to Charles the Bald.

During the tenth century Toscanella was for some time under the Bishop of Centumcellae. The succession of its bishops recommences with Joannes (1027); another Joannes distinguished himself in the reform of Benedict (1049) and brought back the clergy of Tuscania to the common life. Gilbert (1059) and Giselbert (1080) were also promoters of reform. Bishop Richard (1086–1093), however, adhered to the party of Frederick Barbarossa's antipope Clement III, who, in 1193, united Toscanella with Centumcellae and the see of Blera.

=== Viterbo ===
In 1192 Pope Celestine III made it the diocese of Viterbo, on territory split off from the diocese of Tuscanella, but jointly held (aeque personaliter) with that see until 1913. The episcopal seat was transferred from Toscanella to Viterbo.

Viterbo was notorious as a center of heresy. During the episcopate of Bishop Raynerius (c.1200), the Paterini, who practiced a form of gnostic manicheanism, first appear in Viterbo. Pope Innocent III came to Viterbo personally in June 1207, and engaged in the search for Paterini and their sympathizers, most of whom had fled. They were active, however, throughout the 13th century, and were still found there in 1304.

In the fourteenth century the clergy of Toscanella repeatedly refused to recognize the bishop elected by the chapter of Viterbo, so that Pope Clement V (1312) reserved to the Holy See the right of appointment.

The episcopal palace was completed in 1267, under the auspices of Raynerius Gatti, Captain of the People of Viterbo for the third time. The papal election of 1268–1271, the longest in papal history, took place in the episcopal palace in Viterbo. The experience led directly to the forming of the first rules for holding a papal conclave.

The territory of the diocese was stricken by a major earthquake on 28 May 1320.

In 1353, Cardinal Albornoz, who was appointed Legatus a latere and Vicar in spiritualities and temporalities for all the lands in Italy subject to the dominion of the Church, came to effect the reconquest of the Papal States. He invested Viterbo with a siege, beginning in May 1354. On 23 June, Viterbo submitted, and built a fortress (Rocca) for the governor of the Patrimony. In 1367, during the sojourn of Pope Urban V at Viterbo, a quarrel between the populace and the retinue of one of the cardinals developed into a general uprising, which Cardinal Marcus of Viterbo, who had arrived at the papal court from Genoa on 8 September, quickly put down. The incident is reported in great detail by Pope Urban V himself, in the bull "Pii Patris" of 1 December 1367, in which he lifted the censures imposed upon Viterbo because of the incident.

On 31 August 1369, the diocese lost territory when Pope Urban V established the Diocese of Montefiascone.

In 1375 Francesco di Vico took possession of the city, which joined in the general revolt against papal rule, but quickly submitted. When the Western Schism arose, Vico's tyranny recommenced; he took the side of Pope Clement VII and sustained a siege by Cardinal Orsini. The people rose and killed him (8 May 1387), and Viterbo returned to the obedience of Pope Urban VI. But in 1391 Gian Sciarra di Vico reentered the city and took possession of its government. In 1391 Cardinal Pileo, the papal legate of Clement VII, would have given the city over to Pope Boniface IX, but his plan failed, and he fled, so Vico came to an understanding with Boniface.

On 5 December 1435, the city of Corneto was separated from the Diocese of Viterbo and erected as the Diocese of Corneto by Pope Eugenius IV, and joined with the then recently erected Diocese of Montefiascone.

After a century of trouble, peace was not re-established until 1503, when the government of Viterbo was subsequently assigned to a cardinal legate, rather than to the governor of the Patrimony. One of its cardinal legates was Reginald Pole, around whom there grew up at Viterbo a coterie of friends, Vittoria Colonna among them (from 1541 to 1547), who aroused suspicions of heterodoxy. After 1628 Viterbo was the residence again of a simple governor.

On 2 May 1936 the diocese of Viterbo e Toscanella gained territory from the suppressed Territorial Abbacy of San Martino al Monte Cimino.

=== Restructuring ===
The Second Vatican Council (1962–1965), in order to ensure that all Catholics received proper spiritual attention, decreed the reorganization of the diocesan structure of Italy and the consolidation of small and struggling dioceses. It also recommended the abolition of anomalous units such as exempt territorial prelatures. These considerations applied to Viterbo and the other dioceses governed by its bishop.

On 18 February 1984, the Vatican and the Italian State signed a new and revised concordat. Based on the revisions, a set of Normae was issued on 15 November 1984, which was accompanied in the next year, on 3 June 1985, by enabling legislation. According to the agreement, the practice of having one bishop govern two separate dioceses at the same time, aeque personaliter, was abolished. Instead, the Vatican continued consultations which had begun under Pope John XXIII for the merging of small dioceses, especially those with personnel and financial problems, into one combined diocese.

By 1986, papal policy in the selection of bishops had concentrated in the person of Bishop Luigi Boccadoro the Diocese of Viterbo e Tuscania, the diocese of Acquapendente (since 1951), the diocese of Montefiascone (since 1951), and the Administratorship of the diocese of Bagnoregio (since 1971); he was also the Abbot Commendatory of Monte Cimino. On 27 March 1986, by the bull "Qui Non Sine", Pope John Paul II moved to consolidate these several small dioceses by suppressing them and uniting their territories into the diocese of Viterbo e Tuscania, whose name was changed to the Diocese of Viterbo. There was to be only one cathedral, in Viterbo. The cathedrals in Acquapendente, Montefiascone and Bagnoregio were to become co-cathedrals, and the cathedral Chapters were each to be a Capitulum Concathedralis. There was to be only one diocesan Tribunal, in Viterbo, and likewise one seminary (the regional papal seminary), one College of Consultors, and one Priests' Council. All the priests of all the dioceses were to be incardinated in the diocese of Viterbo.

=== Diocesan synods ===
The Fourth Lateran Council (1216) decreed that provincial synods should be held annually in each ecclesiastical province, and that each diocese should hold annual diocesan synods.

A diocesan synod was an irregularly held, but important, meeting of the bishop of a diocese and his clergy. Its purpose was (1) to proclaim generally the various decrees already issued by the bishop; (2) to discuss and ratify measures on which the bishop chose to consult with his clergy; (3) to publish statutes and decrees of the diocesan synod, of the provincial synod, and of the Holy See.

Bishop Angelo Tignosi (1318–1343) held a diocesan synod at Corneto on 16 May 1320, and another three years later in Viterbo.

Cardinal Tiberio Muti (1611–1636) presided over a diocesan synod, his second, in Viterbo on 18–19 January 1624; its acts were published. Cardinal Francesco Maria Brancaccio held a diocesan synod in Viterbo on 18 September 1639, and had the acts of the synod published. Brancaccio held another synod on 21 November 1649, and published the acts. A diocesan synod was held in the cathedral of Viterbo by Cardinal Urbano Sacchetti (1683–1701) on 24–25 May 1694; its acts were published.

== Bishops ==
=== Diocese of Viterbo e Tuscania ===
United: 12th Century with the Diocese of Tuscanella
Latin Name: Viterbiensis et Tuscanensis
Immediately Subject to the Holy See

==== 1192 to 1400 ====
- Giovanni (1192 – 6 April 1199)
- Raynerius (1199–c.1221)
- Martinus (c.1221–c.1223)
- Philippus (1223–?)
- Nicolaus (attested 1233)
- Matthaeus Sappolini (1233?–1239?)
- Raynerius Capocci, O. Cist. (1243–1244 resigned)
- Scambio Aliotti (1245–1253)
- Alferius (1254–1258)
- Pietro (attested 1259)
- Philippus (1263–1285)
- Pietro Capocci di Romanuccio (1286–c.1312)
- Giovanni (1312–1318) Bishop-elect
- Angelo Tignosi (1318–1343)
- Bernardo del Lago (1344–1347)
- Pietro de Pino (Pierre Pin) (13 May 1348 –1348)
- Giovanni (1348)
- Pietro Dupin (10 December 1348 – 18 November 1350)
- Niccolò de’ Vetuli (19 November 1350 – death July 1385)
- Ambrogio da Parma (1389–1391)
- Giacomo Ranieri (1391 – death 12 July 1417)

==== 1400 to 1600 ====
- Giacomo di Angeluccio Uguzzolini (17 December 1417 – 2 May 1429)
- Giovanni Cecchini Caranzoni (10 February 1430 – 1460)
- Pietro di Francesco Gennari (1460–1472)
- Francesco Maria Scelloni, O.F.M. (1472 – 5 December 1491)
- Matteo Cybo (1491–1498)
- Cardinal Raffaele Riario (1498–1506) Administrator
- Ottaviano Visconti Riario (1506–1523)
- Cardinal Egidio da Viterbo, O.E.S.A. (1523–1532)

Cardinal Niccolò Ridolfi (1532–1533 Resigned) Administrator

- Giampietro Grassi (6 Jun 1533 – 1538 Died)

Sede vacante (1538–1548)

Cardinal Niccolò Ridolfi (1538–1548 Resigned) Administrator

- Niccolò di Antonio Ugolini (25 May 1548 – 2 Nov 1550 Died)
- Sebastiano Gualterio (30 Jan 1551 – 16 Sep 1566 Died)
- Cardinal Giovanni Francesco Gàmbara (1566–1576 Resigned)
- Carlo Montigli (28 Mar 1576 – 10 Apr 1594 Died)
- Girolamo Matteucci (5 Dec 1594 – 21 Jan 1609 Died)

==== 1600 to 1800 ====
- Cardinal Lanfranco Margotti (1609–1611)
- Cardinal Tiberio Muti (1611–1636)
- Cardinal Alessandro Cesarini (14 May 1636 – 13 Sep 1638 Resigned)
- Cardinal Francesco Maria Brancaccio (1638–1670 Resigned)
- Stefano Brancaccio (2 Jun 1670 – 8 Sep 1682 Died), Archbishop (personal title); Cardinal in 1681
- Cardinal Urbano Sacchetti (29 Mar 1683 – 24 Jan 1701 Resigned)
- Cardinal Andrea Santacroce (24 Jan 1701 – 10 May 1712 Died), Archbishop (personal title)
- Cardinal Michelangelo dei Conti (1 Aug 1712 – 14 Mar 1719 Resigned), Archbishop (personal title): future Pope Innocent XIII
- Adriano Sermattei (15 Mar 1719 – 9 Apr 1731 Died)
- Alessandro degli Abbati (1731–1748)
- Cardinal Raniero Simonetti (6 May 1748 – 20 Aug 1749 Died), Archbishop (personal title)
- Cardinal Giacomo Oddi (22 Sep 1749 – 2 May 1770 Died), Archbishop (personal title)
- Francesco Pastrovich, O.F.M. Conv. (14 Dec 1772 – 4 Apr 1783 Died)
- Cardinal Muzio Gallo (14 Feb 1785 – 13 Dec 1801 Died)

==== since 1800 ====
- Dionisio Ridolfini Conestabile (1803–1806)
- Antonio Gabriele Severoli (11 Jan 1808 – 8 Sep 1824 Died)
- Gaspare Bernardo Pianetti (3 Jul 1826 – 4 Mar 1861 Retired)
- Cardinal Gaetano Bedini (1861–1864)
- Cardinal Matteo Gonella (1866–1870)
- Luigi Serafini (27 Jun 1870 – 20 Feb 1880 Resigned)
- Giovanni Battista Paolucci (27 Feb 1880 – 9 Nov 1892 Died)
- Eugenio Clari (16 Jan 1893 – 9 Mar 1899 Died)
- Antonio Maria Grasselli, O.F.M. Conv. (19 Jun 1899 – 30 Dec 1913 Resigned)
- Emidio Trenta (17 Jul 1914 – 24 Jan 1942 Died)
- Adelchi Albanesi (14 Apr 1942 – 21 Mar 1970 Died)
- Luigi Boccadoro (1970–1987)

=== Diocese of Viterbo, Acquapendente, Bagnoregio, Montefiascone, Tuscania e San Martino al Monte Cimino ===
United: 27 March 1986 with the dioceses of Acquapendente, Bagnoregio, and Montefiascone Immediately Subject to the Holy See

- Fiorino Tagliaferri (14 Mar 1987 – 30 Jun 1997 Retired)

=== Diocese of Viterbo ===
16 February 1991: Name Changed

- Lorenzo Chiarinelli (30 Jun 1997 – 11 Dec 2010 Retired)
- Lino Fumagalli (11 Dec 2010 – 7 Oct 2022 Retired)
- Orazio Francesco Piazza (7 Oct 2022 – Present)

== Territorial abbacy of San Martino al Monte Cimino ==
This Benedictine territorial abbey (i.e. exerting diocesan authority, rather than being subject to a bishop of a diocese) was established as such in 1300. In 1927, San Martino al Monte Cimino had been given to Bishop Trenta of Viterbo as administrator. Then the right of patronage over the abbey was renounced by Prince Doria Pamphili. On 2 May 1936, Pope Pius XI issued a bull, suppressing the territorial abbey as an autonomous prelature, and united it to the diocese of Viterbo and Tuscania. The bishop of Viterbo was to enjoy the additional title of Abbot of San Martino al Monte Cimino. The Vicar General of the diocese of Viterbo was also to be the Vicar General of the abbey, and a Vicar Capitular (elected to administer the diocese during an episcopal vacancy) would also be administrator of the abbey.

== Books ==
=== Sources for lists of bishops ===
- Gams, Pius Bonifatius (1873). Series episcoporum Ecclesiae catholicae: quotquot innotuerunt a beato Petro apostolo (in Latin). Ratisbon: Typis et Sumptibus Georgii Josephi Manz. pp. 736–738.
- Eubel, Conradus, ed. (1913). Hierarchia catholica (in Latin). Vol. Tomus 1 (second ed.). Münster: Libreria Regensbergiana.
- Eubel, Conradus, ed. (1914). Hierarchia catholica (in Latin). Vol. Tomus 2 (second ed.). Münster: Libreria Regensbergiana.
- Gulik, Guilelmus (1923). Eubel, Conradus (ed.). Hierarchia catholica (in Latin). Vol. Tomus 3 (second ed.). Münster: Libreria Regensbergiana.
- Gauchat, Patritius (Patrice) (1935). Hierarchia catholica (in Latin). Vol. Tomus IV (1592-1667). Münster: Libraria Regensbergiana.
- Ritzler, Remigius; Sefrin, Pirminus (1952). Hierarchia catholica medii et recentis aevi V (1667-1730) (in Latin). Patavii: Messagero di S. Antonio.
- Ritzler, Remigius; Sefrin, Pirminus (1958). Hierarchia catholica medii et recentis aevi (in Latin). Vol. Tomus VI (1730-1799). Patavii: Messagero di S. Antonio.
- Ritzler, Remigius; Sefrin, Pirminus (1968). Hierarchia Catholica medii et recentioris aevi sive summorum pontificum, S. R. E. cardinalium, ecclesiarum antistitum series... A pontificatu Pii PP. VII (1800) usque ad pontificatum Gregorii PP. XVI (1846) (in Latin). Vol. VII. Monasterii: Libr. Regensburgiana.
- Remigius Ritzler; Pirminus Sefrin (1978). Hierarchia catholica Medii et recentioris aevi... A Pontificatu PII PP. IX (1846) usque ad Pontificatum Leonis PP. XIII (1903) (in Latin). Vol. VIII. Il Messaggero di S. Antonio.
- Pięta, Zenon (2002). Hierarchia catholica medii et recentioris aevi... A pontificatu Pii PP. X (1903) usque ad pontificatum Benedictii PP. XV (1922) (in Latin). Vol. IX. Padua: Messagero di San Antonio. ISBN 978-88-250-1000-8.

=== Studies ===
- Cappelletti, Giuseppe (1847). Le chiese d'Italia (in Italian). Vol. sesto (6). Venezia: G. Antonelli. pp. 73–179.
- Kehr, Paulus Fridolinus (1907). Italia pontificia: Latium (in Latin). Vol. II. Berlin: Apud Weidmannos. pp. 196–200, 207–214.
- Lanzoni, Francesco (1927). Le diocesi d'Italia dalle origini al principio del secolo VII (an. 604). Faenza: F. Lega, p. 527. (in Italian)
- Marocco, Giuseppe (1837). Monumenti dello Stato pontificio e relazione topografica di ogni paese (in Italian). Vol. Tomo XIV. Roma. [many inscriptions]
- Pinzi, Cesare (1887). Storia della città di Viterbo (in Italian). Vol. I. Roma: Tipografia della Camera dei deputati. Pinzi, Cesare (1889). Volume II. Pinzi, Cesare (1899). Volume III. with documents
- Schwartz, Gerhard (1907). Die Besetzung der Bistümer Reichsitaliens unter den sächsischen und salischen Kaisern: mit den Listen der Bischöfe, 951-1122. Leipzig: B.G. Teubner. pp. 265–267.(in German)
- Ughelli, Ferdinando; Coleti, Niccolò (1717). Italia sacra, sive De Episcopis Italiae (in Latin). Vol. Tomus primus (secunda ed.). Venice: apud Sebastianum Coleti. pp. 1401–1424.

== Sources and external links ==
- GigaCatholic on the diocese, with incumbent biography links
- GigaCatholic on the San Martino al Monte Cimino
