= Diocese of Acquapendente =

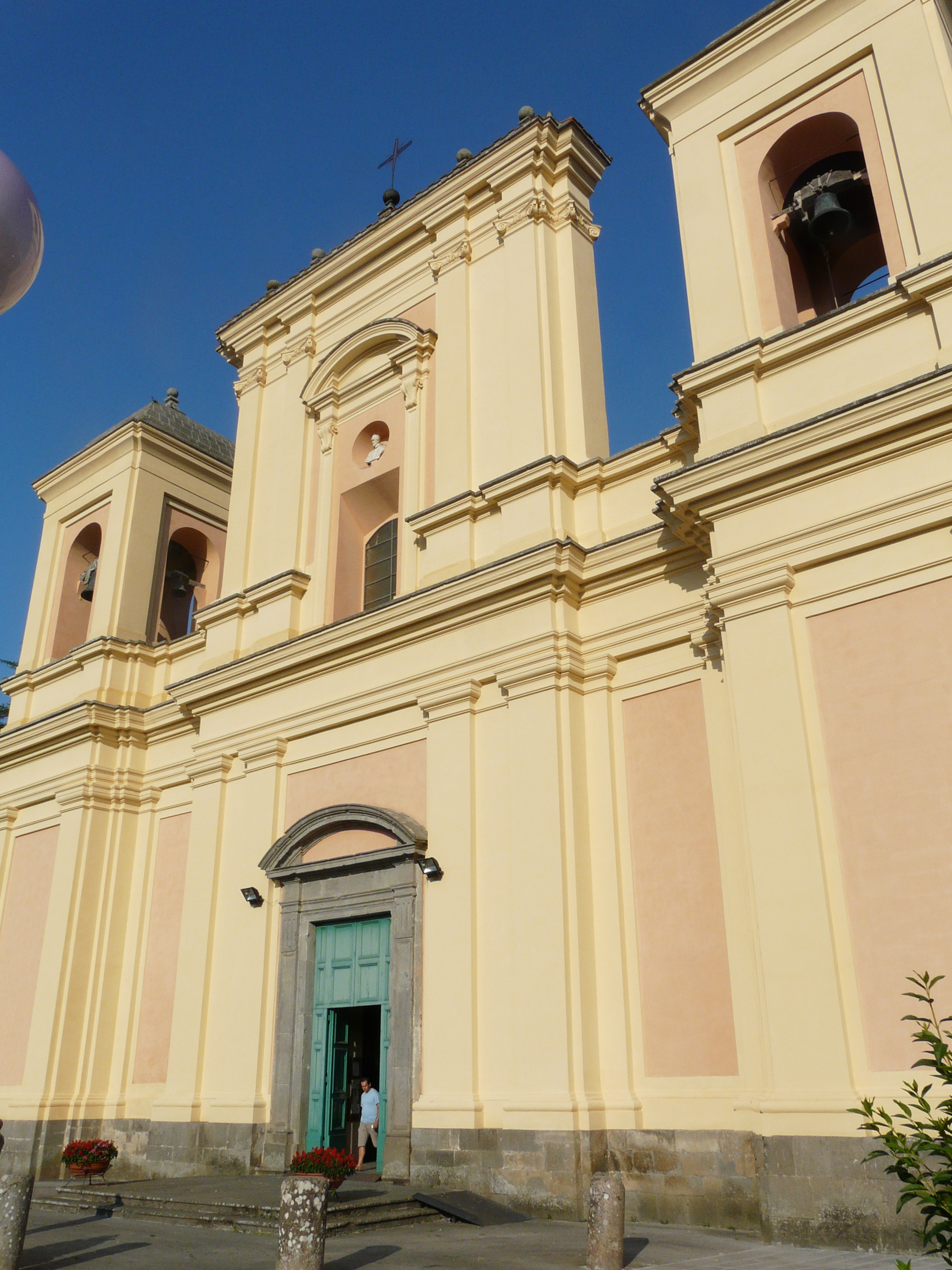
Acquapendente Cathedral

The Italian Roman Catholic diocese of Acquapendente was an ecclesiastical territory in Lazio. The seat of the bishop was in the cathedral of Acquapendente, dedicated to the Holy Sepulchre (San Sepolcro). The diocese was established in 1649, when it was created in the place of the suppressed diocese of Castro. In 1986, along with other dioceses, it was merged into the diocese of Viterbo, Acquapendente, Bagnoregio, Montefiascone, Tuscania e San Martino al Monte Cimino.

== History ==
In 1649, in consequence of a conspiracy, Cristoforo Girarda, a Barnabite of Novara and Bishop of Castro, was assassinated in the Second War of Castro. In punishment of this crime, Pope Innocent X ordered Castro to be destroyed, and raised Acquapendente to the dignity of an episcopal city (Bull, 13 September 1649), directly under the Holy See. Its bishops, however, retained the appellation "post Castrenses." The first incumbent of the new See was the Hieronymite Pompeo Mignucci of Offida, who had been Archbishop of Ragusa. He took possession on 10 January 1650.

Bishop Nicolò Leti (1655–1674) held a diocesan synod in Acquapendente on 9–10 May 1660, and published the Constitutions of the synod. Bishop Florido Pierleoni, C.O. (1802–1829) held a diocesan synod in 1818.

By the middle of 1986, papal policy in the selection of bishops had concentrated in the person of Bishop Luigi Boccadoro: the Diocese of Viterbo e Tuscania, the diocese of Acquapendente (since 1951), the diocese of Montefiascone (since 1951), and the Administratorship of the diocese of Bagnoregio (since 1971); he was also the Abbot Commendatory of Monte Cimino. On September 30, 1986, Pope John Paul II moved to consolidate these several small dioceses by suppressing them and uniting their territories into the diocese of Viterbo e Tuscania, whose name was changed to the Diocese of Viterbo. The diocese of Acquapendente ceased to exist.

The title of Acquapendente, though not the diocese structure, was revived in 1991, to serve as a titular see. It is currently the episcopal title of an auxiliary bishop.

== Bishops of Acquapendente ==
- Pompeo Mignucci, O.S.H. (1650–1654)
- Nicolò Leti (14 Jun 1655 – 30 Sep 1674 Resigned)
- Lodovico Magni, O.F.M. Conv. (1 Oct 1674 – 1680 Died)
- Gian Lorenzo Castiglioni (9 Dec 1680 – 5 Aug 1682 Died)
- Giambattista Febei (12 Jul 1683 – 14 Apr 1688 Died)
- Alessandro Fedele (17 Apr 1690 –1696)
- Nicolò Nardini (21 May 1696 – Jul 1697 Died)
- Ambrosio Angelini (20 Nov 1697 – 9 Dec 1710 Resigned)
- Bernardino Egidio Recchi (26 Jan 1711 – Feb 1728 Died)
- Ferdinando Agostino Bernabei, O.P. (12 Apr 1728 –1729)
- Simone Gritti (23 Dec 1729 – 25 Nov 1743 Resigned)
- Bernardo Bernardi, O.F.M. Conv. (28 Nov 1746 – 31 Oct 1758 Died)
- Giovanni Domenico Santucci (22 Nov 1758 – 4 Jun 1763 Died)
- Clemente Maria (Vincent) Bardini, O.S.B. (18 Jul 1763 – 4 Jul 1790 Died)
- Paolo Bartoli (21 Feb 1794 –1801)
- Florido Pierleoni, C.O. (20 Sep 1802 – 29 Dec 1829 Died)
- Niccola Belletti (15 Mar 1830 –1843)
- Felicissimo Salvini (19 Jun 1843 –1847)
- Giovanni Battista Pellei (14 Jun 1847 – 22 Nov 1877 Died)
- Concetto Focaccetti (1878–1887)
- Gisleno Veneri (23 May 1887 –1919 Retired)
- Tranquillo Guarneri (8 Mar 1920 – 21 Jul 1937 Died)
- Giuseppe Pronti (17 Mar 1938 – 1 Jan 1951 Appointed, Bishop of Nocera Umbra-Gualdo Tadino)
- Luigi Boccadoro (14 Jun 1951 – 27 Mar 1986 Appointed, Bishop of Viterbo, Acquapendente, Bagnoregio, Montefiascone, Tuscania e San Martino al Monte Cimino)

== Bibliography ==
- Gams, Pius Bonifatius (1873). Series episcoporum Ecclesiae catholicae: quotquot innotuerunt a beato Petro apostolo (in Latin). Ratisbon: Typis et Sumptibus Georgii Josephi Manz. p. 660.
- Gauchat, Patritius (Patrice) (1935). Hierarchia catholica. Vol. Tomus IV (1592-1667). Münster: Libraria Regensbergiana.
- Ritzler, Remigius; Sefrin, Pirminus (1952). Hierarchia catholica medii et recentis aevi. Vol. Tomus V (1667-1730). Patavii: Messagero di S. Antonio.
- Ritzler, Remigius; Sefrin, Pirminus (1958). Hierarchia catholica medii et recentis aevi. Vol. Tomus VI (1730-1799). Patavii: Messagero di S. Antonio.
- Ritzler, Remigius; Sefrin, Pirminus (1968). Hierarchia Catholica medii et recentioris aevi (in Latin). Vol. VII (1800–1846). Monasterii: Libreria Regensburgiana.
- Remigius Ritzler; Pirminus Sefrin (1978). Hierarchia catholica Medii et recentioris aevi (in Latin). Vol. VIII (1846–1903). Il Messaggero di S. Antonio.
- Pięta, Zenon (2002). Hierarchia catholica medii et recentioris aevi (in Latin). Vol. IX (1903–1922). Padua: Messagero di San Antonio. ISBN 978-88-250-1000-8.
- Ughelli, Ferdinando; Coleti, Nicolò (1717). Italia sacra: sive De episcopis Italiae et insularum adjacentium (in Latin). Vol. Tomus primus. Venice: apud Sebastianum Coleti. pp. 583–585.
