= Roman Catholic Diocese of Satriano e Campagna =

The Diocese of Satriano e Campagna (Latin: Dioecesis Satrianensis et Campaniensis) was a Roman Catholic diocese located in the town of Satriano in the Province of Catanzaro in the Calabria region of southern Italy. In 1818, the diocese of Campagna was united with the Archdiocese of Conza to form the Archdiocese of Conza e Campagna. The diocese of Satriano was completely suppressed, and its territory incorporated into the diocese of Campagna.

In 1968, the title of Bishop of Satriano, though not the diocese itself, was restored as the name of a titular see.

== Diocese of Campagna ==
The city of Satriano, which was the seat of a bishop, was completely deserted. At the request of the Emperor Charles V, in his capacity as King of Naples, Pope Clement VII erected the Diocese of Campagna on 20 May 1525, uniting it with the diocese of Satriano, aeque personaliter (two dioceses with one and the same bishop). Both were assigned to the metropolitanate of Salerno. The new bishop of Campagna was the Bishop of Satriano, Cherubino Caietani, who was installed as bishop of Campagna on 19 June 1525. The city of Campagna belonged to the Marchesi Grimaldi.

The Collegiate Church of S. Maria della Pace in Campagna, which had eight dignities and eighteen canons, was promoted into the cathedral church for the new diocese. In 1770, there were seven dignities (the Archdeacon, the Archpriest, the Dean, the Cantor, the Primicerius, the Treasurer, and the Sacristan) and eighteen canons.

=== After Napoleon ===
Following the extinction of the Napoleonic Kingdom of Italy, the Congress of Vienna authorized the restoration of the Papal States and the Kingdom of Naples. Since the French occupation had seen the abolition of many Church institutions in the Kingdom, as well as the confiscation of most Church property and resources, it was imperative that Pope Pius VII and King Ferdinand IV reach agreement on restoration and restitution.

A concordat was signed on 16 February 1818, and ratified by Pius VII on 25 February 1818. Ferdinand issued the concordat as a law on 21 March 1818. The right of the king to nominate the candidate for a vacant bishopric was recognized, as in the Concordat of 1741, subject to papal confirmation (preconisation).

On 27 June 1818, Pius VII issued the bull De Ulteriore, in which he reestablished the metropolitan archbishopric of Conza. At the same time he abolished the diocese of Satriano, which had been united aeque principaliter with the diocese of Campagna, and incorporated the territory of Satriano into the diocese of Campagna. The diocese of Campagna was assigned to the archdiocese of Conza, in such a way that the archbishop of Conza was also the perpetual administrator of the diocese of Campagna.

In 1885, the diocese of Campagna had ten parishes with 19,674 Catholics.

By a decree of Pope Benedict XV on 30 September 1921, the diocese of Campagna became independent of the archdiocese of Conza.

On 4 August 1973, the Archbishop of Salerno, Gaetano Pollio (1969-1984), was also named bishop of Campagna. The three dioceses of Salerno, Acerno, and Campagna were held aeque principaliter.

=== Diocesan reorganization of 1986 ===
The Second Vatican Council (1962–1965), in order to ensure that all Catholics received proper spiritual attention, decreed the reorganization of the diocesan structure of Italy and the consolidation of small and struggling dioceses. It also recommended the abolition of anomalous units such as exempt territorial prelatures.

On 18 February 1984, the Vatican and the Italian State signed a new and revised concordat. Based on the revisions, a set of Normae was issued on 15 November 1984, which was accompanied in the next year, on 3 June 1985, by enabling legislation. According to the agreement, the practice of having one bishop govern two separate dioceses at the same time, aeque personaliter, as was the case with Salerno and Acerno, was to be abolished. Instead, the Vatican continued consultations which had begun under Pope John XXIII for the merging of small dioceses, especially those with personnel and financial problems, into one combined diocese. On 30 September 1986, Pope John Paul II ordered that the dioceses of Salerno and Acerno, as well as the diocese of Campagna (which had not been incorporated into the reorganized metropolitanate of Conza), be merged into one diocese with one bishop, with the Latin title Archidioecesis Salernitana-Campaniensis-Acernensis. The seat of the diocese was to be in Salerno, and the cathedral of S. Maria e S. Matteo in Salerno was to serve as the cathedral of the merged dioceses. The cathedral in Acerno and the cathedral in Campagna were to become co-cathedrals, and the cathedral Chapters of Acerno and of Campagna were each to be a Capitulum Concathedralis. There was to be only one diocesan Tribunal, in Salerno, and likewise one seminary, one College of Consultors, and one Priests' Council. The territory of the new diocese was to include the territory of the previous dioceses of Salerno, Acerna, and Campagna.

== Bishops of Satriano e Campagna ==
- Cherubino Caietano, O.P. (1525 - 1544)
- Camillo Mantuato (1544 - 1560)
- Marco Lauro, O.P. (1560 - 1571)
- Girolamo Scarampi (1571 - 1583)
- Flaminio Roverella (1584 - 1589 resigned)
- Giulio Cesare Guarnieri (1591 - 1607)
- Barzellino de' Barzellini (1607 - 1618)
- Alessandro Scappi (1618 -1627)
- Costantino Testi, O.P. (1628 - 1637)
- Alessandro Liparuli (1637 - 1644)

Gaspare Simeonibus (1644) bishop-elect

- Francesco Carducci (1644 -1649)
- Giuseppe Maria Avila, O.P. (1649 - 1656)
- Juan Caramuel y Lobkowitz, O.Cist. (1657 -1673)
- Domenico Tafuri, O.SS.T. (1673 - 1679)
- Girolamo Prignano (1680 - 1697)
- Giuseppe Bondola, O.F.M.Conv. (1697 - 1713)
- Francesco Saverio Fontana (1714 - 1736)
- Giovanni Angelo Anzani (1736 - 1770)
- Nicola Ferri (1770 - 1773)
- Marco De Leone (1773 - 1793)

Sede vacante (1793-1818)

== See also ==
- Satrianum (actually about the diocese of Satriano)
- Roman Catholic Archdiocese of Sant'Angelo dei Lombardi-Conza-Nusco-Bisaccia
- Roman Catholic Archdiocese of Salerno-Campagna-Acerno

== Bibliography ==
=== Episcopal lists ===
- Eubel, Conradus, ed. (1913). Hierarchia catholica (in Latin). Vol. I (second ed.). Münster: Libreria Regensbergiana.
- Eubel, Conradus, ed. (1914). Hierarchia catholica (in Latin). Vol. II (second ed.). Münster: Libreria Regensbergiana.
- Eubel, Conradus; Gulik, Guilelmus (1923). Hierarchia catholica (in Latin). Vol. III (second ed.). Münster: Libreria Regensbergiana.
- Gams, Pius Bonifatius (1873). Series episcoporum Ecclesiae catholicae: quotquot innotuerunt a beato Petro apostolo (in Latin). Ratisbon: Typis et Sumptibus Georgii Josephi Manz. pp. 852–853.
- Gauchat, Patritius (Patrice) (1935). Hierarchia catholica (in Latin). Vol. IV (1592-1667). Münster: Libraria Regensbergiana.
- Ritzler, Remigius; Sefrin, Pirminus (1952). Hierarchia catholica medii et recentis aevi (in Latin). Vol. V (1667-1730). Patavii: Messagero di S. Antonio.
- Ritzler, Remigius; Sefrin, Pirminus (1958). Hierarchia catholica medii et recentis aevi (in Latin). Vol. VI (1730-1799). Patavii: Messagero di S. Antonio.

=== Studies ===
- Cappelletti, Giuseppe (1870). Le chiese d'Italia: dalla loro origine sino ai nostri giorni (in Italian). Vol. vigesimo (20). Venezia: G. Antonelli. pp. 535–549.
- Cestaro, Antonio (1972). Le diocesi di Conza e di Campagna nell'età della Restaurazione. (in Italian). Roma: Edizioni di storia e letteratura 1972.
- D'Avino, Vincenzio (1848). Cenni storici sulle chiese arcivescovili, vescovili, e prelatizie (nullius) del regno delle due Sicilie (in Italian). Naples: dalle stampe di Ranucci. pp. 222–229. [article written by Bonaventura Ricotti]
- Gams, Pius Bonifatius (1873). Series episcoporum Ecclesiae catholicae: quotquot innotuerunt a beato Petro apostolo (in Latin). Ratisbon: Typis et Sumptibus Georgii Josephi Manz. p. 865.
- Giordano, Anna (2004). I regesti delle pergamene del Capitolo di Campagna: 1170-1772. (in Italian and Latin) Battipaglia (SA): Carlone, 2004.
- Rivelli, Antonio Vincenzo (1894). Memorie storiche della città di Campagna. (in Italian). Salerno: Volpe 1894.
- Ughelli, Ferdinando; Coleti, NIccolo (1721). Italia sacra sive De episcopis Italiæ, et insularum adjacentium (in Latin). Vol. Tomus septimus (7). Venice: apud Sebastianum Coleti. pp. 452–464.
