= Christopher Columbus Copy Book =

Letters presumably sent by Christopher Columbus to the Catholic Monarchs of Spain

- Author: Christopher Columbus
- Language: Castilian
- Publication date: 16th century
- Publication place: Spain

A manuscript containing the transcription of nine letters apparently sent by Christopher Columbus to the Catholic Monarchs, which appeared in 1985 in Tarragona, is called the Christopher Columbus Copy Book (Spanish: Libro copiador de Cristóbal Colón). From the form of the handwriting it has been estimated that the book could date from the last third of the 16th century. Most of the nine documents are "letter-relations" that narrate the events of Columbus' various voyages of discovery to the Indies; seven were previously unknown and the other two contain a different text from what was already known.

There is no unanimity as to whether the contents of the Copy Book are the work of Columbus, but most historians accept its authenticity. If confirmed as authentic, the discovery of the Copy Book would constitute the most important discovery of documents relating to Columbus' voyages in the 20th century.

== Discovery and publication ==
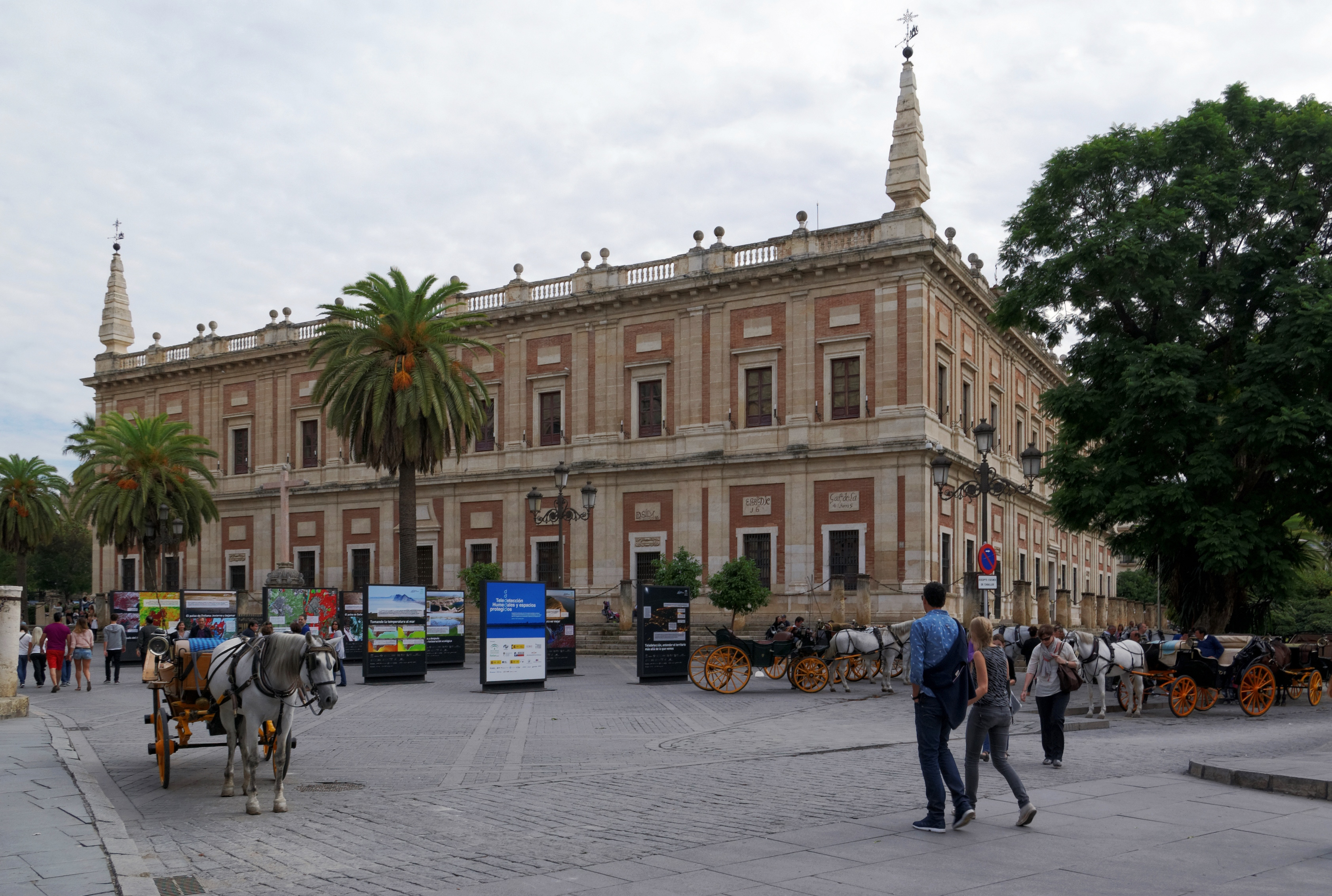
The Columbus Copy Book is deposited in the General Archive of the Indies in Seville.

In 1985 a bookseller from Tarragona named José del Río, owner of the antiquarian bookstore "Catedral", reported that he had come into possession of this manuscript, without specifying its origin. He later stated that he had found it in a collection coming from a family in Mallorca.

In December 1985 Mercedes Dexeus, director of the Spanish Bibliographic and Documentary Treasure Center, invited professors Juan Gil and Consuelo Varela to inspect the find. These historians ruled its authenticity, so the Spanish State bought it in 1987 and deposited it in the General Archive of the Indies in Seville in March 1988. (Note: It entered the Archive of the Indies on March 14, 1988 and was classified as Patronato 296 B, as recorded in Ministry of Culture. "Adquisiciones y Donaciones (censo-guía de archivos de España e Iberoamérica)" (in Spanish).)

The Copy Book was published in facsimile in 1989, in a joint edition between the Ministry of Culture, the patronage of the Fifth Centenary and the publishing house Testimonio. The print run was limited to 980 copies, numbered and notarized. In addition, 42 copies were printed for the 21 countries of the Spanish-American community and 75 for non-commercial use. The historian Antonio Rumeu de Armas, who also wrote two complementary volumes of transcriptions and commentaries, was in charge of the publication. Rumeu transcribed the documents preserving most of the original spelling but adding capital letters and accents in keeping with modern Castilian and modifying the punctuation. Juan Gil harshly criticized this edition for being riddled with errors and this prompted him to publish his own transcription in 1992.

[it was lost] through whose negligence I do not know, in the upper right-hand corner of pages 63-72, torn which, although already torn, was still preserved in the photocopies made available to us (...). It is a pity that the princely edition of the new Colombian letters does not honor the science and accredited wisdom of the illustrious historian, who apparently prepared the text in haste, without trying to grasp its true meaning or to solve the problems it raises. Sometimes this haste makes Rumeu understand the opposite of what the original says.

— Juan Gil, Christopher Columbus. Complete Texts and Documents., p.76-79.

== Content ==
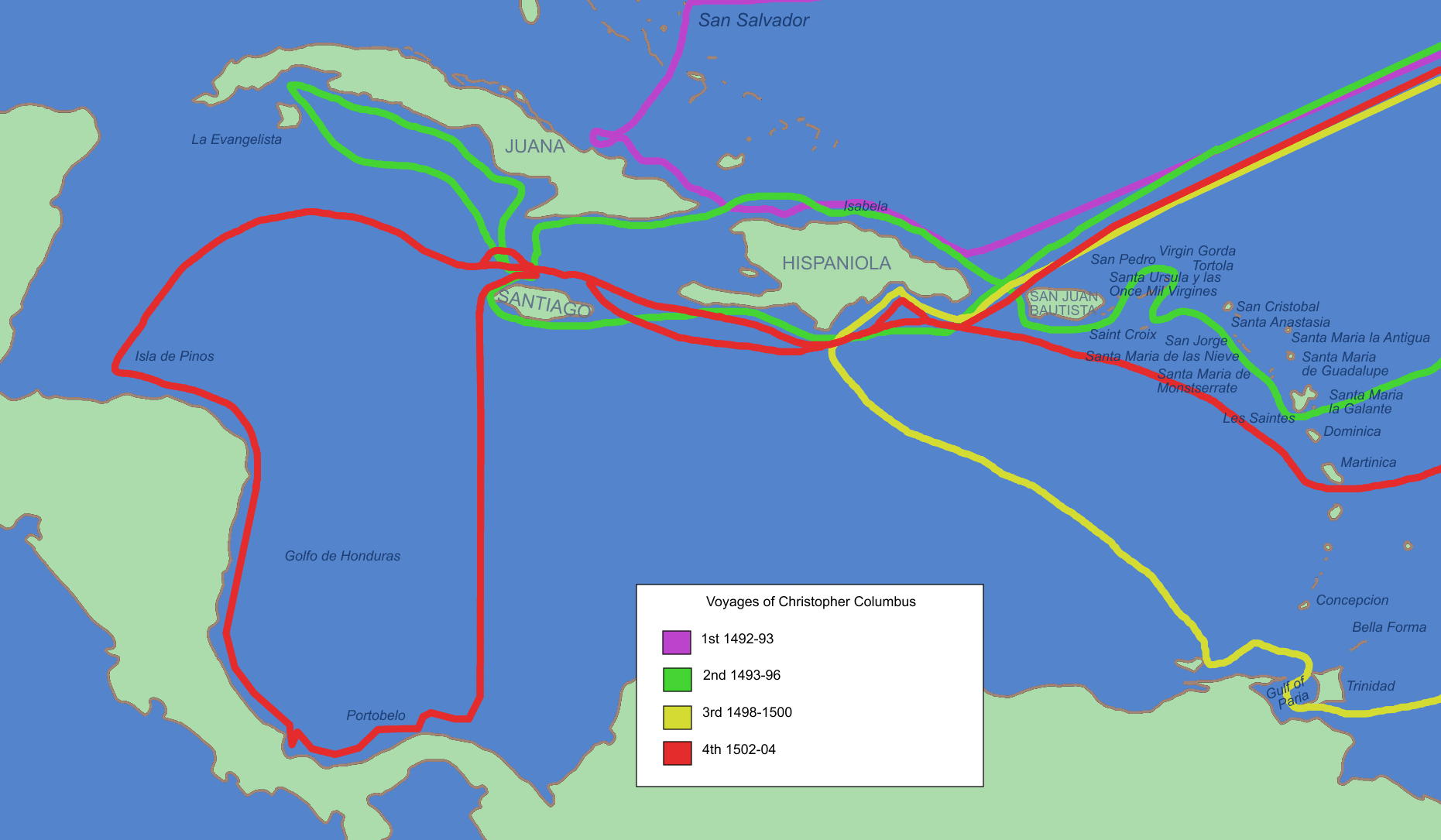
Map of the Caribbean Sea with possible itineraries of Columbus' voyages.

The Columbus Copy Book consists of 38 folios, measuring 230 x 330 mm and written on both sides. It contains the transcriptions of nine documents apparently written by Christopher Columbus between 1493 and 1503 and all addressed to the King and Queen of Spain: one 'letter-relation' about Columbus' First Voyage to the Indies and four about his second, all previously unknown; two brief personal letters from 1500, also unpublished; and two other letters-relations, relating to the third and fourth voyages, which were already known but in different forms from those appearing in the Copy Book.

In the manuscript the letters are copied one after the other, in chronological order and without any particular title. The book's paper and handwriting indicate that the book must have been written in the second half of the 16th century.

=== Document 1 ===
Letter dated "en la mar de España" (in the sea of Spain) on March 4, 1493, which recounts Columbus' first voyage. It is a clearly and coherently structured text, which implies that it was not written in haste. Its content is partly similar to that of the letters announcing the discovery of the Indies, printed and circulated throughout Europe in 1493, although it also presents important differences. Despite being longer by some 300 words, this letter to the kings gives fewer details about the discovered lands and their inhabitants, omitting for example the indigenous name of the first island discovered ("Guanaham" or "Guanahanyn" in the letters printed in 1493) or information about the canoes, the diet and the social structure of the Indians. In addition, it omits problematic points from the previously known charts, which have caused headaches for historians, such as the latitude of Hispaniola, which the printed charts do give, but with an apparently erroneous value, or the mention of the Canary Islands on the return voyage. On the other hand, the tone of this letter is much more messianic than that of the printed letters, with frequent allusions to divine intervention, and affirming that the aim of the enterprise was to obtain riches to finance the conquest of Jerusalem. It also includes a request from Columbus to the monarchs to ask the pope to name his son a cardinal (he does not specify which of them).

=== Document 2 ===
End of document no. 1 and beginning of document no. 2.

Letter-relation about the first months of the second voyage. It is undated, but Rumeu de Armas estimates that it must have been written in January 1494. It includes the first known mention of deaths from smallpox among the Indians that Columbus had brought to Europe and who returned with the discoverers to the Antilles. It also explains how the garrison left by Columbus in Hispaniola on the first voyage was exterminated, but this version is considered less credible than that of other known sources, such as the letter of Dr. Chanca. On the other hand, it describes a map in equidistant cylindrical projection that Columbus would have drawn to represent the lands discovered in "this voyage and the other" and which he encloses with the letter.

=== Document 3 ===
Letter-relation of the exploration by land to Cibao during the second voyage. It has no date, but Rumeu de Armas estimates that it must have been written on April 20, 1494. The text coincides to a large extent with the chronicle of Andrés Bernáldez.

=== Document 4 ===
Letter-relation on the exploration of the islands of Hispaniola, Cuba and Jamaica on the second voyage. It is dated in the city of Isabela on February 26, 1494, but this must be a misprint since the letter narrates events of September 1494, so it possibly dates from February 1495. Like the previous document, this letter contains passages that coincide with Bernáldez's chronicle.

=== Document 5 ===
Fourth letter-relation relative to the second voyage, dedicated to the terrestrial exploration of the island of Hispaniola. Dated in "la vega de La Maguana" on October 15, 1495. Among other things, Columbus complains about the bad behavior of his men and asks the kings to send missionaries to Hispaniola. (Note: We need friars who are weak and out of the knowledge of things of the world, so that they may give us good examples, which we certainly lack, (...) because we need someone to reform our faith more than the Indians need to take it. Quotation contained in: Varela, Consuelo (2006). Aguirre, Isabel (ed.). La caída de Cristóbal Colón: el juicio de Bobadilla (in Spanish). Marcial Pons Historia. ISBN 8496467287.) He also justifies sending a shipment of enslaved Indians to Castile because they were not Christians, and details the best ways to exploit their labor.

=== Document 6 ===
Letter-relation of the third voyage. Undated, Rumeu de Armas states that Columbus wrote it in Saint Dominic in September 1498. A Relation of Columbus' Third Voyage was already known from a copy transcribed by Bartolomé de las Casas and another included in his Historia de las Indias (History of the Indies). However, the text found in the Copy Book presents many differences. For example, at the end of some paragraphs the Book adds sentences that do not appear in the version of Las Casas, often copied from books known to have been read by Columbus, such as the Ymago mundi.

=== Document 7 ===
Brief letter dated "en la ysla Española, olin Ofir" (on the Spanish island, olin Ofir), February 3, 1500, with postscript dated November 20. According to the text, this note accompanied a copy of his 1493 letter about the first voyage (Document No. 1 of this Copy Book), which Columbus was again sending to the kings as a reminder, now that he was falling into disgrace.

=== Document 8 ===
Letter also dated "en la ysla Española, olin Ofir vel friti" (on the Spanish island, olin Ofir vel friti) on the same day as the previous one (February 3, 1500). Columbus communicates to the kings his concern because it seems that some of the letters he sent them have not reached them, mentions that Fray Juan Perez has died, and asks the kings to grant him the mercies they had promised him.

=== Document 9 ===
Last page of document no. 9, with imitation of Christopher Columbus' signature.

Letter written from Jamaica ("Janahica" in the text) on July 7, 1503 recounting the fourth voyage. Two versions of this document were previously known, one in Spanish called Manuscrito de Salamanca and the other in Italian, nicknamed the "Lettera Rarissima", but the text in the Copy Book shows substantial differences with respect to them.

== Importance ==
There is a diversity of opinions as to whether the contents of the Copy Book can be considered the verbatim words of Christopher Columbus. Most historians accepted it as authentic when it appeared, based on the reputation of the people who initially studied it. Luis Arranz expressed his suspicion that the 1493 letter may contain "some interpolations." For his part, David Henige stated that it is impossible to fully assure the authenticity of a 16th-century document. More recently, the historian Felipe Fernández-Armesto has declared himself clearly skeptical about the authorship of the Libro copiador, insinuating that it is a fraud:

This document, claimed to be an 18th century copy of unpublished writings of Columbus, appeared, without its provenance or history being published, in the hands of a bookseller just in time to be sold for a high price during the excitement leading up to the V Centenary. Although scholars welcomed it, its inconsistencies with other materials whose authenticity is more certain make it a highly suspect document.

— Felipe Fernández-Armesto (2007)

Ferdinand Columbus' and Bartolomé de las Casas' accounts of the Admiral's voyages coincide with some of the documents in the Copy Book, implying that, if Columbus did indeed write these letters-relations, both biographers must have had access to them at the time.

The Book not only provides new information about the Admiral's voyages, but also, scattered among the documents, contains various clues about other aspects of his life, such as his family and his geographical theories. If authentic, the discovery of the Copy Book would have been the most important discovery of documents relating to Columbus in the 20th century.

== See also ==
- History of the Americas

== Bibliography ==
- Rumeu de Armas, Antonio (1989). Libro copiador de Cristóbal Colón: correspondencia inédita con los Reyes Católicos sobre los viajes a América (in Spanish). Testimonio. ISBN 84-86290-22-8.
- Gil, Juan; VARELA, Consuelo (1997). Cristóbal Colón. Textos y documentos completos: Relaciones de viajes, cartas y memoriales (in Spanish) (2nd ed.). Alianza Editorial. ISBN 8420623202.
- Davidson, Miles H. (1997). Columbus then and now: a life reexamined. University of Oklahoma Press. ISBN 0806129344.
- Arranz Márquez, Luis (2006). Cristóbal Colón: misterio y grandeza (in Spanish). Editorial Marcial Pons Historia. ISBN 9788496467231.
