= Columbus's letter on the first voyage =

1493 document by Christopher Columbus

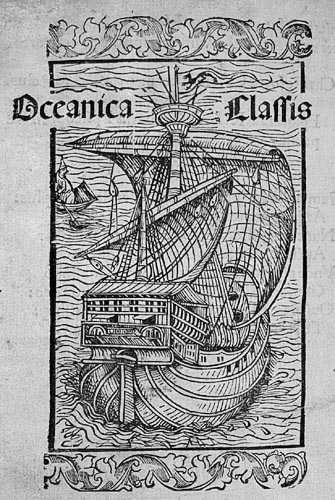
Illustrative woodcut from the Latin edition of Columbus's letter printed in Basel in 1494.

A letter written by Christopher Columbus on 15 February 1493, is the first known document announcing the completion of his first voyage across the Atlantic, which set out in 1492 and reached the Americas. The letter was ostensibly written by Columbus himself, aboard the caravel Niña, on the return leg of his voyage. A postscript was added upon his arrival in Lisbon on 4 March 1493, and it was probably from there that Columbus dispatched two copies of his letter to the Spanish court.

The letter was instrumental in spreading the news throughout Europe about Columbus's voyage. Almost immediately after Columbus's arrival in Spain, printed versions of the letter began to appear. A Spanish version of the letter (presumably addressed to Luis de Santángel), was printed in Barcelona by early April 1493, and a Latin translation (addressed to Gabriel Sánchez) was published in Rome around a month later (ca. May 1493). The Latin version was swiftly disseminated and reprinted in many other locations—Basel, Paris, Antwerp, etc.—still within the first year of his arrival.

In his letter, Christopher Columbus claimed to have discovered and taken possession of a series of islands on the edge of the Indian Ocean in Asia; Columbus was not aware that he had stumbled upon a new continent. He described the islands, particularly Hispaniola and Cuba, exaggerating their size and wealth, and suggested that mainland China probably lay nearby. He also gave a brief description of the Indigenous peoples (whom he called "Indians"), emphasizing their docility and amenability, and the prospects of their conversion to Catholicism. However, the letter also revealed local rumors about a fierce man-eating tribe of "monsters" in the area (probably Caribs), although Columbus himself disbelieved the stories, and dismissed them as a myth. The letter provides very few details of the oceanic voyage itself, and covers up the loss of the flagship of his fleet, the Santa María, by suggesting Columbus left it behind with some colonists, in a fort he erected at La Navidad in Hispaniola. In the letter, Columbus urges the Catholic monarchs to sponsor a second, larger expedition to the Indies, promising to bring back immense riches.

A slightly different version of Columbus's letter, in manuscript form, addressed to the Catholic monarchs of Spain, was found in 1985, part of the Libro Copiador collection, and has led to some revision of the history of the Columbus letter.

The two earliest published copies of Columbus's letter on the first voyage aboard the Niña were donated in 2017 by the Jay I. Kislak Foundation to the University of Miami library in Coral Gables, Florida, where they are housed.

"The Letter of Columbus on the Discovery of America"
Read by Availle for LibriVox
Audio 00:20:05 (full text)

== Background ==
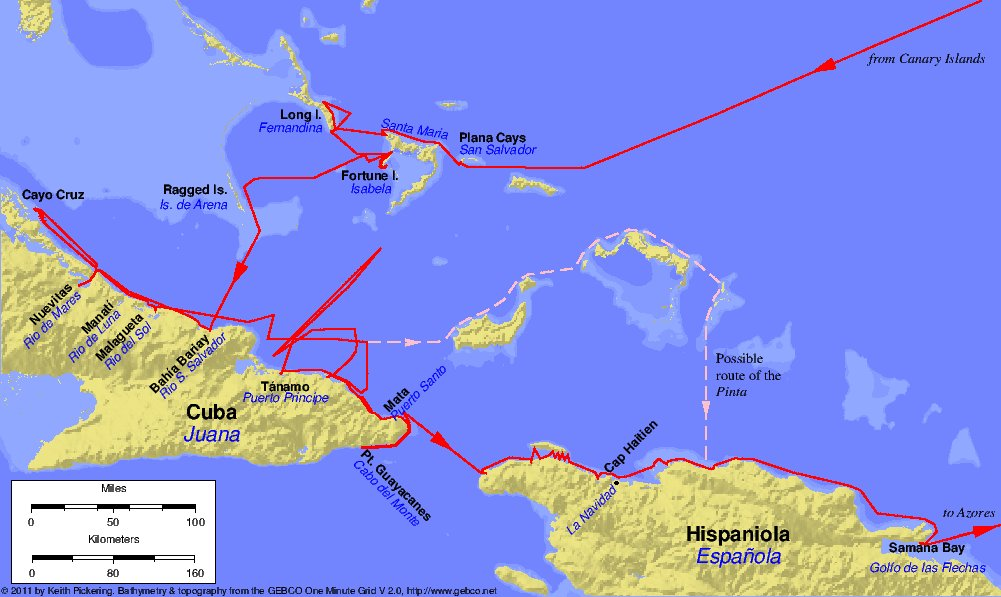
Route of Columbus's first voyage

Christopher Columbus, a Genoese captain in the service of the Crown of Castile, set out on his first voyage in August 1492 with the objective of reaching the East Indies by sailing west across the Atlantic Ocean. Instead of reaching Asia, Columbus stumbled upon the Caribbean islands of the Americas. Convinced nonetheless he had discovered the edges of Asia, Columbus set sail back to Spain on 15 January 1493, aboard the caravel Niña. According to the journal of his voyage, on 14 February Columbus was caught in a storm off the Azores islands. The resulting poor condition of his ship forced him to put in at Lisbon (Portugal) on 4 March 1493. Columbus finally arrived at Palos de la Frontera in Spain 11 days later, on 15 March 1493.

During the return journey, while aboard the ship, Columbus wrote a letter reporting the results of his voyage and announcing his discovery of the "islands of the Indies". In a postscript added while he was idling in Lisbon, Columbus reports sending at least two copies of the letter to the Spanish court—one copy to the Catholic Monarchs, Ferdinand II of Aragon and Isabella I of Castile, and a second copy to the Aragonese official Luis de Santángel, the principal supporter and financial backer of Columbus's expedition.

Copies of Columbus's letter were somehow picked up by publishers, and printed editions of his letter began to appear throughout Europe within weeks of Columbus's return to Spain. A Spanish version of the letter (based on the letter he sent to Luis de Santángel) was printed in Barcelona probably in late March or early April 1493. A Latin translation of the letter (addressed to Gabriel Sanchez) was printed in Rome about a month later. Within the first year of his arrival, eight more editions of the Latin version were printed in various European cities—two in Basel, three in Paris, another two in Rome and another in Antwerp. Already by June 1493, the letter had been translated by a poet into Italian verse, and that version went through multiple editions in the next couple of years. A German translation appeared in 1497. The rapid dissemination of Columbus's letter was enabled by the printing press, a new invention that had established itself only recently.

Columbus's letter (particularly the Latin edition) forged the initial public perception of the newly discovered lands. Indeed, until the discovery of Columbus's on-board journal, first published in the 19th century, this letter was the only known direct testimony by Columbus of his experiences on the first voyage of 1492. It is estimated that, on the whole, between 1493 and 1500, some 3,000 copies of the Columbus letter were published, half of them in Italy, making it something of a best-seller for the times. By contrast, Columbus's 1495 letter of his second voyage and his 1505 letter of his fourth voyage had only one printing each, probably not exceeding 200 copies.

Original versions of Columbus's letter, written by his hand, have never been found. Only the printed editions—Spanish and Latin—are known. However, a third version of the letter, contained in a 16th-century manuscript collection known as the Libro Copiador, was discovered in 1985. This manuscript version differs in several significant ways from the printed editions and, although its authenticity is still tentative, many believe the Copiador version to be a closer rendition of Columbus's original missive.

== Content of the letter ==
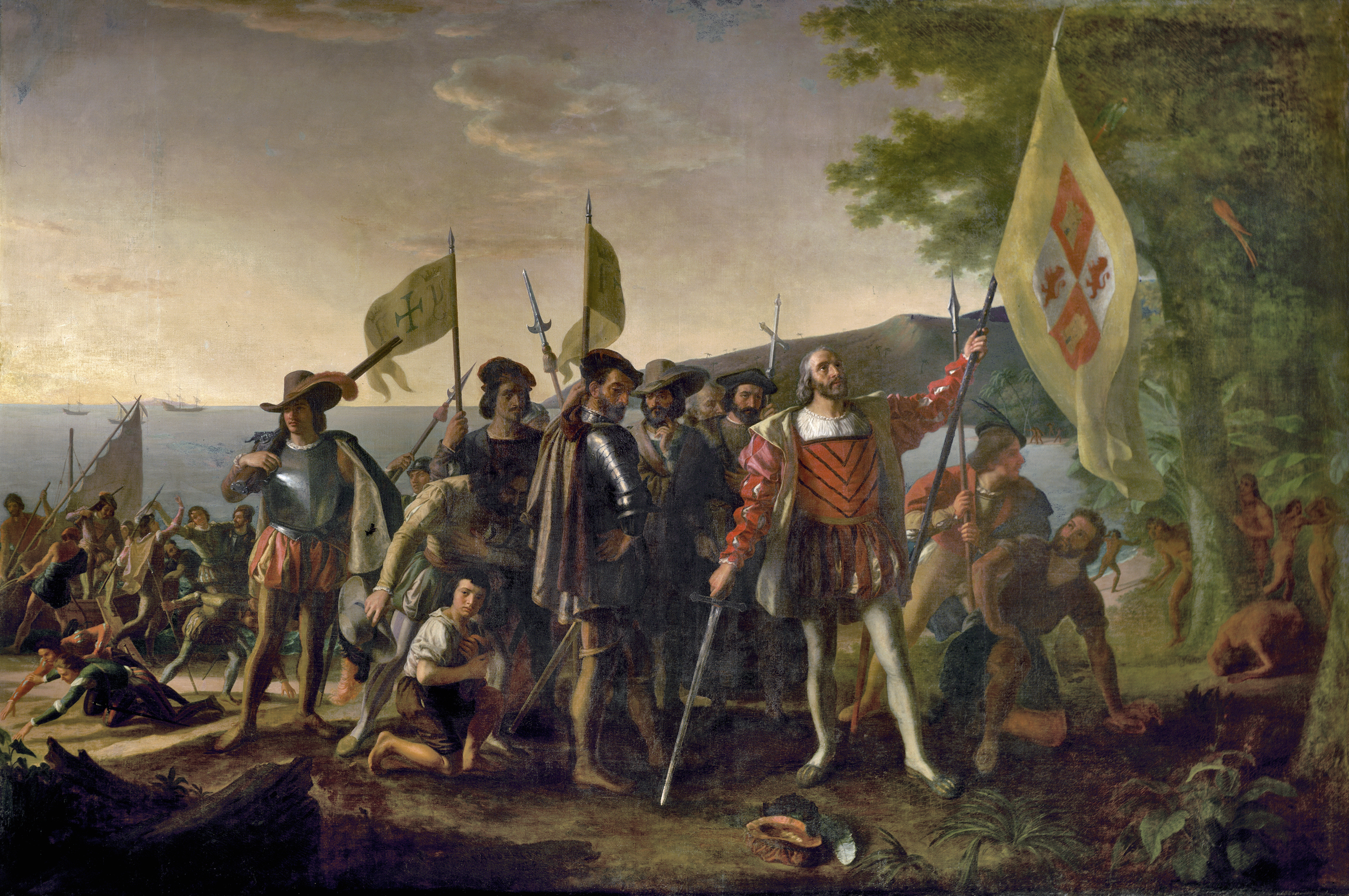
Landing of Columbus by John Vanderlyn, 1847. Columbus takes possession of the islands of the Indies, "with flags flying and no one objecting"

The published Latin versions of the letter are almost all titled "Letter of Columbus, on the islands of India beyond the Ganges recently discovered". The term "India beyond the Ganges" (India extra Gangem) was the archaic term from Ptolemy frequently used by earlier geographers to refer vaguely to Southeast Asia (roughly from Burma down to the Malay Peninsula); the Indian subcontinent proper was referred to as "India within the Ganges" (India intra Gangem). Thus the islands of "India beyond the Ganges" claimed to have been reached would roughly correspond to modern Indonesia or thereabouts. The earlier printed Spanish edition bears no title, nor does the manuscript copy of the letter to the Catholic monarchs (Libro Copiador).

In the letter, Christopher Columbus does not describe the journey itself, saying only that he traveled thirty-three days and arrived at the islands of "the Indies" (las Indias), "all of which I took possession for our Highnesses, with proclaiming heralds and flying royal standards, and no one objecting". He describes the islands as being inhabited by "Indians" (Indios).

In the printed letters, Columbus relates how he bestowed new names on six of the islands. Four are in the modern Bahamas: (1) San Salvador (for which he also gives the local name, Guanaham in the Spanish edition and Guanahanin in the Latin letter; modern English texts normally render it as Guanahani), (2) Santa Maria de Concepcion, (3) Ferrandina (Fernandinam in the Latin version, in modern texts Fernandina), and (4) la isla Bella (given as Hysabellam in the Latin version, and La Isabela in modern texts). He also names (5) La Isla Juana (Joanam in Latin, modern Cuba) and (6) the island of La Spañola (Hispana in the Latin letter, modern Hispaniola). In the letter, Columbus says that he believes Juana is actually part of the continental mainland (terra firme) of Cathay (Catayo, archaic for China), even though he also admits some of the Indians he encountered informed him that Juana was an island. Later in the letter, Columbus locates the islands at the latitude of 26°N, more north of their actual location ("es distinta de la linea equinocial veinte e seis grados"). (Note: in the Copiador version, Columbus makes no mention of the latitudes nor the Native name Guanahanin.)

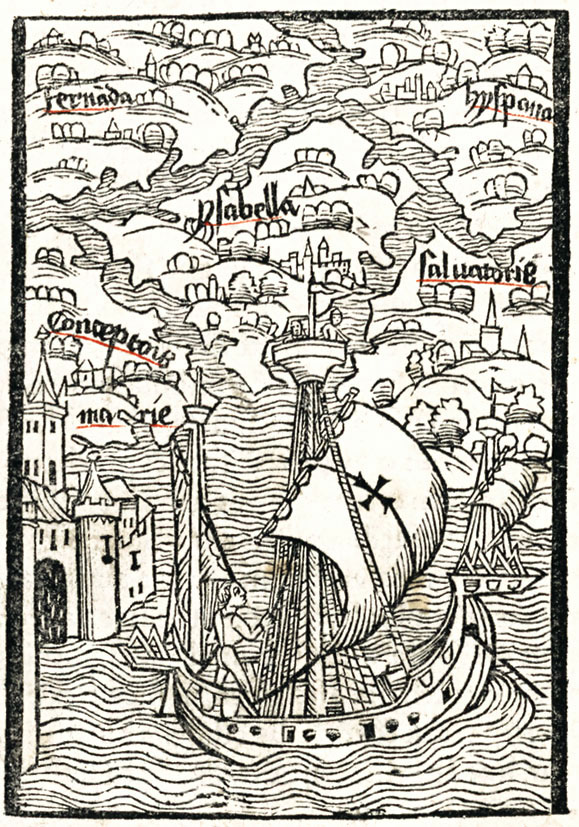
The six islands of the Indies, woodcut from the 1494 Basel edition of Columbus's letter

In his letter, Columbus describes how he sailed along the northern coast of Juana (Cuba) for a spell, searching for cities and rulers, but found only small villages "without any sort of government" ("no cosa de regimiento"). He notes that the Natives usually fled when approached. Finding this track fruitless, he decided to double-back and head southeast, eventually sighting the large island of Hispaniola, and explored along its northern coast. Columbus exaggerates the size of these lands, claiming Juana is greater in size than Great Britain ("maior que Inglaterra y Escocia juntas") and Hispaniola larger than the Iberian Peninsula ("en cierco tiene mas que la Espana toda").

In his letter, Columbus seems to attempt to present the islands of the Indies as suitable for future colonization. Columbus's descriptions of the natural habitat in his letters emphasize the rivers, woodlands, pastures, and fields "very suitable for planting and cultivating, for raising all sorts of livestock herds and erecting towns and farms" ("gruesas para plantar y senbrar, para criar ganados de todas suertes, para hedificios de villas e lugares"). He also proclaims that Hispaniola "abounds in many spices, and great mines of gold, and other metals" ("ay mucha especiarias y grandes minas de oros y otros metales"). He compares lush and well-watered Hispaniola as more favorable to settlement than mountainous Cuba.

Columbus characterizes the Native inhabitants of the Indies islands as primitive, innocent, without reason ("like beasts", "como bestias"), and unthreatening. He describes how they go about largely naked, that they lack iron and weapons, and are by nature fearful and timid ("son asi temerosos sin remedio"), even "excessively cowardly" ("en demasiado grado cobardes").

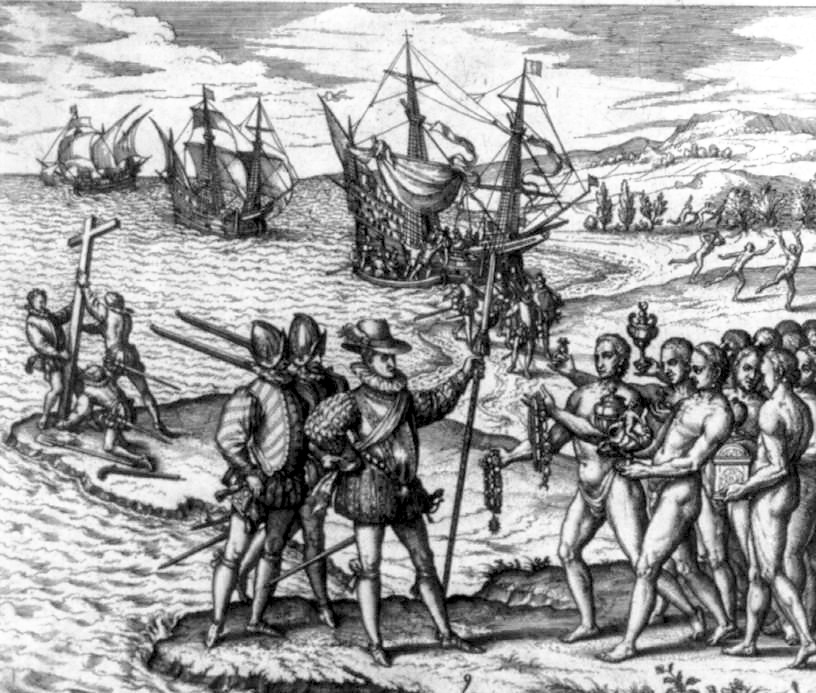
Hispaniola Indians offering Columbus's men piles of gold in exchange for their shoelaces (illustration from Theodor de Bry, 1594)

According to Columbus, when persuaded to interact, the Natives are quite generous and naïve, willing to exchange significant amounts of valuable gold and cotton for useless glass trinkets, broken crockery, and even shoelace tips ("cabos de agugetas"). In the printed editions (albeit not in the Copiador version) Columbus notes that he tried to prevent his own sailors from exploiting the Indians' naïveté, and that he even gave away things of value, like cloth, to the Natives as gifts, in order to make them well-disposed "so that they might be made Christians and incline full of love and service towards Our Highnesses and all the Castilian nation".

Columbus makes particular note that the Natives lack organized religion, not even idolatry ("no conocian ninguna seta nin idolatria"). He claims the Natives believed the Spaniards and their ships had "come down from heaven" ("que yo...venia del cielo"). Columbus notes that the Natives of different islands seem to all speak the same language (the Arawaks of the region all spoke Taíno), which he conjectures will facilitate "conversion to the holy religion of Christ, to which in truth, as far as I can perceive, they are very ready and favorably inclined".

Possibly worried that his characterization might make it appear that the Natives are unsuitable for useful labor, Columbus notes that the Indians are "not slow or unskilled, but of excellent and acute understanding". He also notes that the "women appear to work more than the men".

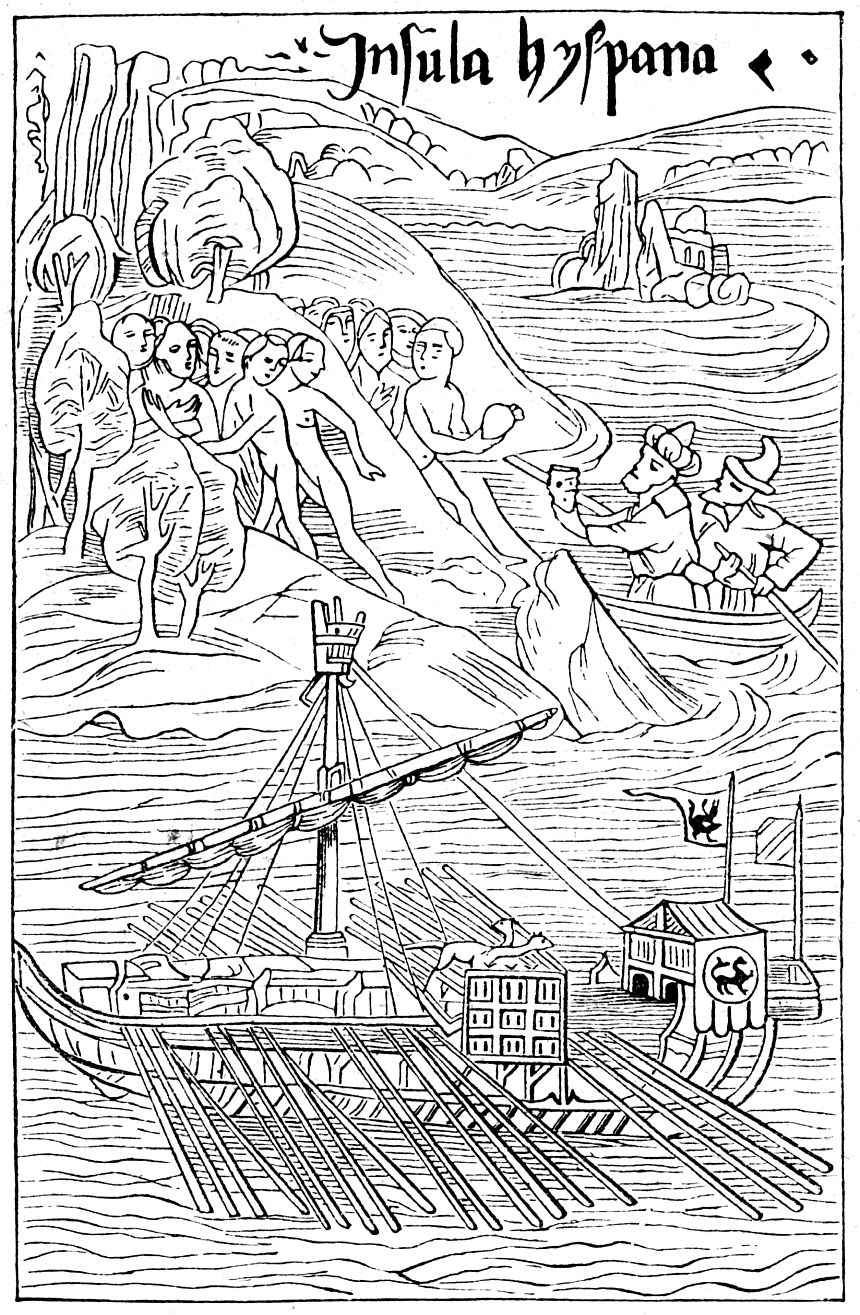
Columbus lands in Hispaniola, some Natives flee, others trade. Woodcut from 1494 Basel edition of Columbus's letter. Notice the depiction of the oar-driven galley in the foreground – an early European interpretation of the Indian canoe, as per Columbus's description.

Columbus's physical descriptions are brief, noting only that the Natives have straight hair and "nor are they black like those in Guinea". They go around usually naked, although sometimes they wear a small cotton loincloth. They often carry a hollow cane, which they use to both till and fight. They eat their food "with many spices which are far too hot" ("comen con especias muchas y muy calientes en demasía"; in the Copiador version Columbus refers to a red hot chili pepper by its Taíno name, agís). Columbus claims the Indians practice monogamy ("each man is content with only one wife"), "except for the rulers and kings" (who can have as many as twenty wives). He confesses he is uncertain if they have a notion of private property ("Ni he podido entender si tenian bienes proprios"). In a more detailed passage, Columbus describes the Indian oar-driven canoe (canoa, the first known written appearance of this word, originally from the Taíno language). Columbus compares the Indian canoe to the European fusta (small galley).

Towards the end of the letter, Columbus reveals that local Indians told him about the possible existence of cannibals, which he refers to as "monsters" ("monstruos"). This is a probable reference to the Caribs from the Leeward Islands, although neither the word "cannibal" nor "Carib" appears in the printed editions (however, in the Copiador letter, he claims the "monsters" come from an island called "Caribo", possibly Dominica). Columbus says the monsters are reported to be long-haired, very ferocious, and "eat human flesh" ("los quales comen carne humana"). Columbus has not seen them himself, but says that local Indians claim the monsters have many canoes, and that they sail from island to island, raiding everywhere. However, Columbus proclaims disbelief in the existence of these "monsters", or rather suggests this is likely just a local Indian myth pertaining to some distant Indian seafaring tribe who are probably not unlike themselves ("I regard them as of no more account than the others", "yo no los tengo en nada mas que a los otros").

Columbus connects the monsters story to another local legend about a tribe of female warriors, who are said to inhabit the island of "Matinino" east of Hispaniola ("first island of the Indies, closest to Spain", possibly referring to Guadeloupe). Columbus speculates that the aforesaid canoe-borne monsters are merely the "husbands" of these warrior women, who visit the island intermittently for mating. The island of women reportedly abounds in copper, which the warrior-women forge into weapons and shields.

Distribution of Arawaks, Caribs, and Guanajatabey in the West Indies, c. 1492

Columbus rounds off with a more optimistic report, saying the local Indians of Hispaniola also told him about a very large island nearby which "abounds in countless gold" ("en esta ay oro sin cuenta"). (He doesn't give this gold island a name in the printed letters, but in the Copiador version, this island is identified and named as "Jamaica".) In the printed letters, Columbus claims to be bringing back some of the gold island's "bald-headed" inhabitants with him. Earlier in the letter, Columbus had spoken also of the land of "Avan" ("Faba" in the Copiador letter), in the western parts of Juana, where men are said to be "born with tails" ("donde nacan la gente con cola")—probably a reference to the Guanajatabey of western Cuba.

The Libro Copiador version of the letter contains more Native names of islands than the printed editions. For instance, in the Copiador letter, Columbus notes that island of "monsters" is called "Caribo", and explains how the warrior-women of Matinino send away their male children to be raised there. It also refers to an island called "Borinque" (Puerto Rico), unmentioned in the printed editions, that the Natives report to lie between Hispaniola and Caribo. The Copiador letter notes Juana is called "Cuba" by the Natives ("aquéllos llaman de Cuba"). He also gives more details about the gold island, saying it is "larger than Juana", and lying on the other side of it, "which they call Jamaica", where "all the people have no hair and there is gold without measure" ("que llaman Jamaica; adonde toda la gente della son si cabellos, en ésta ay oro sin medida"). In the Copiador letter, Columbus suggests that he is bringing normal (full-haired) Indians back to Spain who have been to Jamaica, who will report more about it (rather than bringing the island's own bald-headed inhabitants, as claimed in the printed letters).

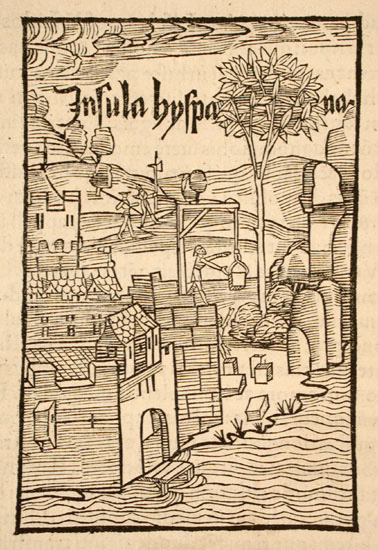
Construction of the fort at La Navidad, Hispaniola, from the 1494 Basel edition of Columbus's letter

Columbus also gives an account of some of his own activities in the letters. In the letter, he notes that he ordered the erection of the fort of La Navidad on the island of Hispaniola, leaving behind some Spanish colonists and traders. Columbus reports he also left behind a caravel—evidently covering up the loss of his flagship, the Santa María. He reports that La Navidad is located near reported gold mines, and is a well-placed entrepot for the commerce that will doubtlessly soon be opened with the Great Khan ("gran Can") on the mainland. He speaks of a local king near Navidad whom he befriended and treated him as a brother ("y grand amistad con el Rey de aquella tierra en tanto grado que se preciava de me lhamar e tener por hermano")—almost certainly a reference to Guacanagaríx, cacique of Marién.

In the Copiador version (but not the printed editions), Columbus alludes to the treachery of "one from Palos" ("uno de Palos"), who made off with one of the ships, evidently a complaint about Martín Alonso Pinzón, the captain of the Pinta (although this portion of the Copiador manuscript is damaged and hard to read). The Copiador version also mentions other points of personal friction not contained in the printed editions, e.g. references to the ridicule Columbus suffered in the Spanish court prior to his departure, his bowing to pressure to use large ships for ocean navigation, rather than the small caravels he preferred, which would have been more convenient for exploring.

At the end of his printed letter, Columbus promises that if the Catholic Monarchs back his bid to return with a larger fleet, he will bring back a lot of gold, spices, cotton (repeatedly referenced in the letter), mastic gum, aloe, slaves, and possibly rhubarb and cinnamon ("of which I heard about here").

Columbus ends the letter urging their Majesties, the Church, and the people of Spain to give thanks to God for allowing him to find so many souls, hitherto lost, ready for conversion to Christianity and eternal salvation. He also urges them to give thanks in advance for all the temporal goods found in abundance in the Indies that shall soon be made available to Castile and the rest of Christendom.

The Copiador version (but not the printed Spanish or Latin editions) also contains a somewhat bizarre detour into messianic fantasy, where Columbus suggests the monarchs should use the wealth of the Indies to finance a new crusade to conquer Jerusalem, Columbus himself offering to underwrite a large army of ten thousand cavalry and one hundred thousand infantry to that end.

The sign off varies between editions. The printed Spanish letter is dated aboard the caravel "on the Canary Islands" on 15 February 1493. ("Fecha en la caravela sobra las yslas de Canaria a xv de Febrero, ano Mil.cccclxxxxiii"), and signed merely "El Almirante", while the printed Latin editions are signed "Cristoforus Colom, oceanee classis prefectus" ("Prefect of the Ocean fleet"). However, it is doubtful Columbus actually signed the original letter that way. According to the Capitulations of Santa Fe negotiated prior to his departure (April 1492), Christopher Columbus was not entitled to use the title of "Admiral of the Ocean Sea" unless his voyage was successful. It would be highly presumptuous for Columbus to sign his name that way in February or March, when the original letter was drafted, before that success was confirmed by the royal court. Columbus only obtained confirmation of his title on 30 March 1493, when the Catholic Monarchs, acknowledging the receipt of his letter, address Columbus for the first time as "our Admiral of the Ocean Sea and Vice-Roy and Governor of the islands which have been discovered in the Indies" ("nuestro Almirante del mar Océano e Visorrey y Gobernador de las Islas que se han descubierto en las Indias"). This suggests the signature in the printed editions was not in the original letter, but was an editorial choice by the copyists or printers.

In the Copiador version there are passages (omitted from the printed editions) petitioning the monarchs for the honors promised him at Santa Fe, and additionally asking for a cardinalate for his son and the appointment of his friend, Pedro de Villacorta, as paymaster of the Indies. The Copiador letter signs off as "made in the sea of Spain on 4 March 1493" ("Fecha en la mar de España, a quatro días de março"), a stark contrast to the 15 February given in the printed versions. There is no name or signature at the end of the Copiador letter; it ends abruptly "En la mar" ("At sea").

In the printed Spanish editions (albeit not in the Latin editions nor the Copiador), there is a small postscript dated 14 March, written in Lisbon, noting that the return journey took only 28 days (in contrast with the 33 days outward), but that unusual winter storms had kept him delayed for an additional 23 days. A codicil in the printed Spanish edition indicates that Columbus sent this letter to the "Escribano de Racion", and another to their Highnesses. The Latin editions contain no postscript, but end with a verse epigram added by Leonardus de Cobraria, Bishop of Monte Peloso.

== History of the letter ==
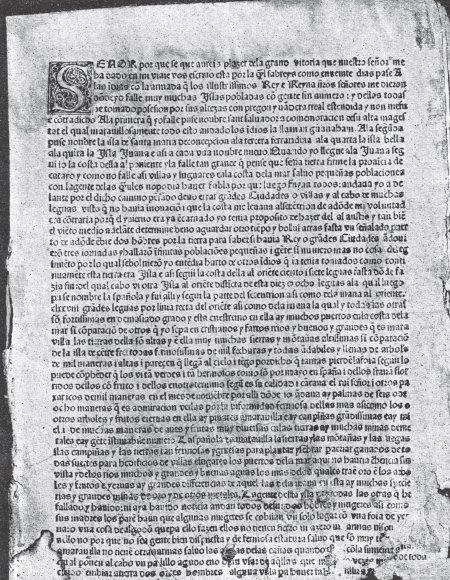
Facsimile of the first page of the folio edition of the Spanish text of Columbus's letter to Luis de Santangel, dated 15 February 1493, and printed in Barcelona. From the original unique copy currently held by the New York Public Library.

No original manuscript copy of Columbus's letter is known to exist. Historians have had to rely on clues in the printed editions, many of them published without date or location, to reconstruct the history of the letter.

It is assumed that Columbus wrote the original letter in Spanish. As a result, historians tend to agree that the Barcelona edition (which has no date or publisher name, and the appearance of being hurriedly printed) was probably the first to be published, and was the closest to the original manuscript. At the end of the Barcelona edition there is a codicil stating:

"Esta carta enbió Colom al Escrivano de Ración, de las Islas halladas en las Indias, contenida á otra de sus Altezas." (Trans: "This letter was sent by Columbus to the Escrivano de Racion. Of the islands found in the Indies. it contains (was contained in?) another (letter) for their Highnesses")

This suggests that Columbus dispatched two letters—one to the Escrivano de Ración, Luis de Santángel, and another to the Catholic Monarchs.

In the printed version of the Spanish letter, the post-script is dated 14 March, rather than 4 March; this could be just a printer's error; the letter to the monarchs in the Libro Copiador gives the correct post-script date, 4 March 1493.

=== Dispatch ===
In his summary of the on-board journal, Columbus's son Ferdinand Columbus (corroborated by Bartolomé de las Casas) reports that his father wrote two letters to the Catholic monarchs in the middle of a storm around the Azores on 14 February and sealed them in watertight casks, one thrown overboard, another tied to the stern, so that if the ships foundered, the letters would drift on their own to land. It is nearly impossible to suppose the letters were dispatched in this manner; the casks were probably fished back when the storm subsided, and the post-script confirms they were sent later. (It is also unlikely Columbus initiated the long letter in the middle of the storm—he surely had more urgent matters to attend to; he probably wrote the main body of the letter in the calm period before the storm began on 12 February, and hurried to finish them when the storm hit.)

There is some uncertainty over whether Christopher Columbus sent the letters directly from Lisbon, after docking there on 4 March 1493, or held on to them until he reached Spain, dispatching the letters only after his arrival at Palos de la Frontera on 15 March 1493.

It is highly probable, albeit uncertain, that Columbus sent the letter from Lisbon to the Spanish court, probably by courier. Columbus's journal says that upon docking in Lisbon, Bartholomew Dias (on behalf of King John II of Portugal) demanded that Columbus deliver his report to him, which Columbus strenuously refused, saying his report was for the monarchs of Spain alone. Columbus probably realized time was of the essence. It was common for royal and commercial agents to accost and interview returning sailors in the docks, so the Portuguese king would likely have the information he sought soon enough. Once he determined the location of the islands discovered by Columbus, John II might initiate a legal offensive or dispatch his own ships, to claim them for Portugal. So Columbus realized the Spanish court needed to be informed of the results of his voyage as soon as possible. Had Columbus decided to wait until he reached Palos to dispatch his letter, it might have been received too late for the Spanish monarchs to react and forestall any Portuguese actions. The earliest Spanish record of the news, reporting that Columbus "had arrived in Lisbon and found all that he went to seek", is contained in a letter by Luis de la Cerda y de la Vega, Duke of Medinaceli, in Madrid, dated 19 March 1493.

It was possibly fear of the interception of the courier from Lisbon by Portuguese agents that prompted Columbus to introduce some disinformation in his letter. For instance, Columbus claims he wrote the letter on a caravel while he was around the Canary Islands (rather than the Azores) probably in order to conceal that he had been sailing in Portuguese territorial waters. (The manuscript letter to the Monarchs writes the location as "Mar de España".) In the letter, Columbus also locates the islands at 26°N, quite north of their actual location, probably trying to set them above the latitude line designated by the Treaty of Alcáçovas of 1479 as the boundary of the exclusive dominions of the Portuguese crown (he fell a little short—the treaty latitude was set at the Canary islands latitude, approximately 27°50', which cuts around the middle of the Florida peninsula). He gives no details of his bearing, no mention of whether he sailed west, north or south, or whether the waters were shallow or deep—Columbus's letters "say much and reveal nothing". Moreover, he is unclear about the length of the trip, claiming it took "thirty-three days" (which is roughly correct if measured from the Canaries, but it was seventy-one days since he left Spain itself; Columbus's letter leaves it ambiguous). Finally, his emphatic statement that he formally "took possession" of the islands for the Catholic monarchs, and left men (and a ship) at La Navidad, may have been emphasized to forestall any Portuguese claim.

=== Recipients ===
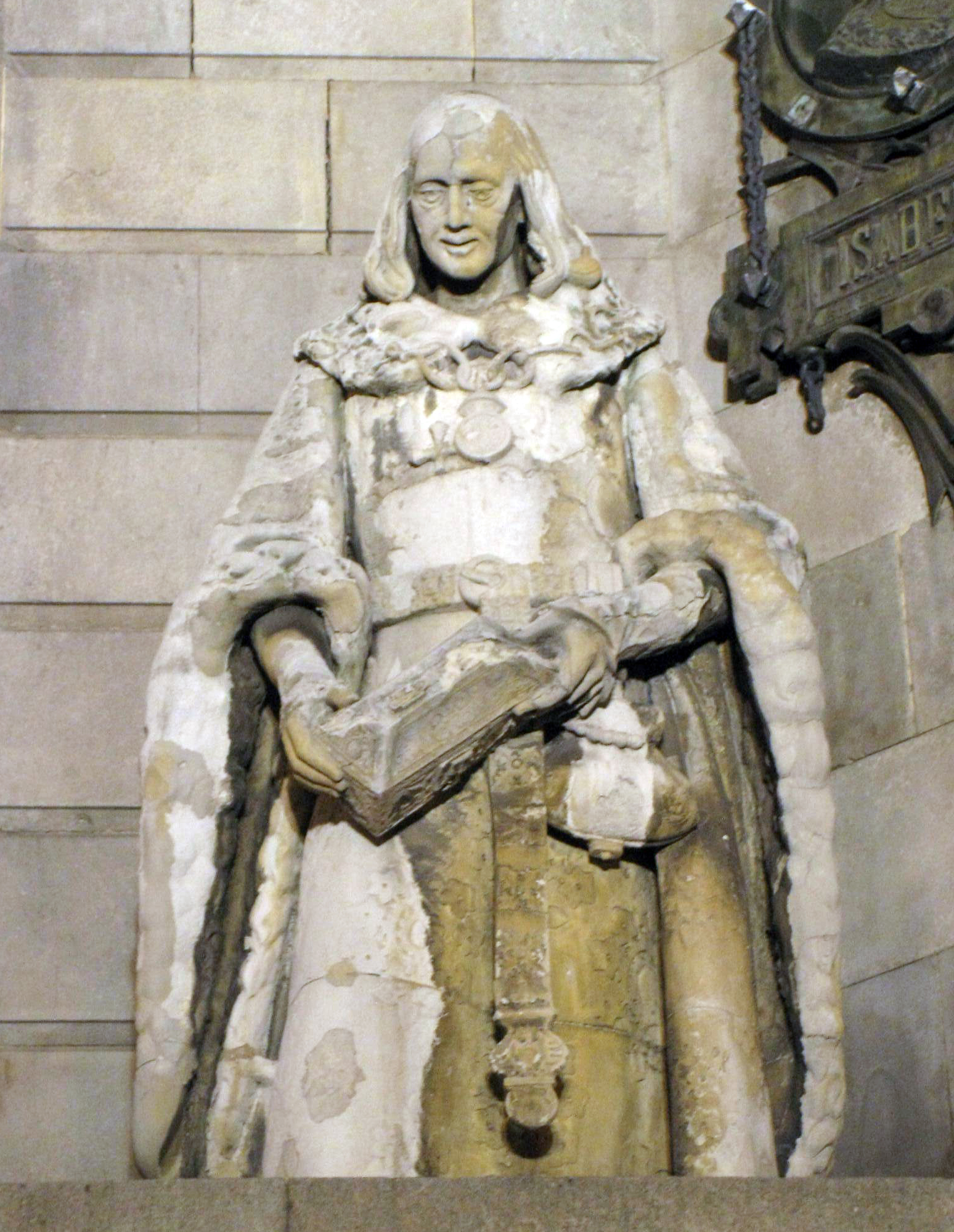
Luis de Santángel, recipient of Columbus's letter

The explicit recipient of Columbus's Spanish letter was the Escribano de Ración—at that time, Luis de Santángel. An official position of the Crown of Aragon, the Escribano de Ración was the high accountant or comptroller of the king's household expenditures, and can be thought of as a finance minister to Ferdinand II of Aragon.

It is unsurprising that Columbus singled Santangel out as the first recipient of the news. Santangel had been the person who made the case to, and persuaded, Queen Isabella to sponsor Columbus's voyage eight months earlier. Indeed, Santangel arranged for much of the financing to the Castilian crown (much of it from his own pocket) to enable the monarchs to sponsor it. As Santangel had a lot riding on the results of this expedition, perhaps more than anybody else, it was perhaps natural for Columbus to address his first letter to him. Moreover, as the letter indicates, Columbus sought more financing to return with an even larger fleet to the Indies as soon as possible, so it would be useful to contact Santangel immediately, so he could set the wheels in motion for a second voyage.

The story of the second copy of the letter, the one ostensibly sent to the Catholic Monarchs, has been more complicated. The "contain" verb in the codicil of the Spanish Letter to Santangel leaves ambiguous which one was contained in which. Some believe the letters to the Monarchs and to Santangel were sent separately, perhaps even on different days (4 and 14 March respectively) others suggest Santangel was supposed to personally deliver the letter to the monarchs (even though handling royal correspondence was outside his formal functions, Santangel's proximity to Isabella may have been a security consideration); still others believe it the other way around, that the letter to Santangel was submitted first to the monarchs to get royal approval before being forwarded to Santangel for ultimate publication (it would have been consistent with Santangel's office as Escribano, to oversee and pay the printers). The reply of the Catholic monarchs to Columbus, dated 30 March 1493, acknowledges receipt of the letter, but clarifies nothing about how it was delivered.

It was long believed by historians that the printed Spanish editions, although bearing no addressee except "Señor", was based on the copy of the letter sent by Columbus to Luis de Santangel, but that the Latin edition printed in Rome (and subsequently Basel, Paris, etc.) was a translated version of the copy of the letter sent by Columbus to the Catholic Monarchs.

The printed Spanish and Latin editions are practically identical, with only some very minor differences, most of them attributable to the printers. In particular, the Latin edition omits the postscript and codicil pertaining to the Escribano, and adds a prologue and epilogue not present in the Spanish editions, which give some clues as to its assumed provenance. The earliest Latin version (although bearing no date or printer name) states the letter was addressed to "Raphael Sanxis" (assumed to mean Gabriel Sanchez, the treasurer of the Crown of Aragon), and has an opening salutation hailing the Catholic king Ferdinand II of Aragon (later Latin editions correct the addressee's name to "Gabriel Sanchez" and add Isabella I of Castile to the salutation). The prologue notes that the translation into Latin was undertaken by the notary Leander de Cosco and completed on 29 April 1493 ("third of the calends of May"). The Latin editions also have an epilogue with an epigram lauding Ferdinand II by the Neapolitan prelate Leonardus de Corbaria, Bishop of Monte Peloso.

For much of the past century, many historians have interpreted these notes to indicate that the Latin edition was a translated copy of the letter Columbus sent to the Catholic monarchs, who were holding court in Barcelona at the time. The story commonly related is that after Columbus's original Spanish letter was read out loud at court, the notary Leander de Cosco was commissioned by Ferdinand II (or his treasurer, Gabriel Sanchez) to translate it into Latin. A copy was subsequently forwarded to Naples (then part of the Crown of Aragon), where Bishop Leonardus got a hold of it. The bishop subsequently carried it to Rome, probably to report its contents to Pope Alexander VI. At the time, the pope was then deep in the midst of arbitrating between the claims of the crowns of Portugal and Spain over Columbus's discoveries. The papal bull Inter caetera, delivering the pope's initial opinion, was issued on 3 May 1493, albeit there remained disputed details to work out (a second and third bull followed soon after). It is possible Bishop Leander sought to use Columbus's letter to influence that process. While in Rome, Bishop Leonardus arranged for the publication of the letter by the Roman printer Stephanus Plannck, possibly with an eye to help popularize and advance the Spanish case. The letter's subsequent reprinting in Basel, Paris and Antwerp within a few months, seems to suggest that copies of the Roman edition went along the usual trade routes into Central Europe, probably carried by merchants interested in this news.

The 1985 discovery of a manuscript copybook, known as the Libro Copiador, containing a copy of Columbus's letter addressed to the Catholic Monarchs, has led to a revision of this history. The Copiador version has some very distinctive differences from the printed editions. It is now increasingly believed that the Latin edition printed in Rome is actually a translation of the letter to Santangel, and that the letter to the Monarchs was never translated nor printed. In other words, all the printed editions, Spanish and Latin, derive from the same Spanish letter to Luis de Santangel,. In this view, the reference to "Raphael Sanxis" added by the Roman printer is regarded as a simple error, probably arising from confusion or uncertainty in Italy about whom exactly was holding the office of "Escribano de Racion" of Aragon at the time, the bishop or the printer mistakenly assuming it was Gabrel Sanchez and not Luis de Santangel. But another possibility is that the Aragonese bureaucracy made a copy of Santangel's letter, and forwarded a copy to Sanchez for his information, and that this letter found its way to Italy by some channel, with or without royal permission (a fragment of an Italian translation suggests the treasurer sent a copy to his brother, Juan Sanchez, then a merchant in Florence.)

Nonetheless, some historians believe that Columbus sent three distinct letters: one the Catholic Monarchs (the manuscript copy), another to Luis de Santangel (origin of the printed Spanish editions), and a third to Gabriel Sanchez (origin of the Latin editions). In other words, that the Santangel and Sanchez letters, although practically identical, are nonetheless distinct. However, this leave open the question of why Columbus would have sent a separate letter to Gabriel Sanchez, treasurer of Aragon, with whom he was not intimate, nor was particularly involved in the Indies enterprise, nor any more influential in court than Santangel or some other people Columbus might have addressed.

The choice of Gabriel Sanchez may, however, have been at Luis de Santangel's recommendation or initiative. Gabriel Sanchez was of a family of conversos who traced their origins back to a Jew named Alazar Goluff of Zaragoza, and Sanchez was married to the daughter of Santangel's cousin (also named Luis de Santangel). Although there is no record of Sanchez's direct involvement in the organization or financing of the fleet, his nephew, Rodrigo Sanchez, was aboard Columbus's ship as either a surgeon or a veedor (or fiscal inspector). Years earlier, Gabriel Sanchez's three brothers—Juan, Alfonso and Guillen—as well as his brother-in-law, the son of Santangel's cousin (also, confusingly, named Luis de Santangel, like his father) were accused of conspiracy in the murder of the Spanish inquisitor Pedro de Arbués in 1485. Juan and Alfonso escaped abroad, Guillen was tried but given the chance to repent. The Santangel brother-in-law, however, was found guilty of Judaizing and sentenced to death. Gabriel Sanchez himself was also accused, but he was soon extricated by his employer, King Ferdinand II. Perhaps not coincidentally, another of the persons implicated in the conspiracy was the uncle of Leander Cosco, the Latin translator of Columbus's letter to Sanchez, who may himself have been a relative to the Sanchez clan. Gabriel's brother Juan Sanchez set himself up in Florence as a merchant, and is known to have received a copy of Columbus's letter from Gabriel Sanchez, which commissioned to be translated into Italian (only a partial fragment survives, see below). One of Gabriel's nephews, also named Juan Sanchez, would later (1502) become the agent of the Aragon treasury in Seville and a contractor of supplies for the Hispaniola colonies. These intricate familial connections between Luis de Santangel, Gabriel Sanchez, Juan Sanchez and Leander Cosco, could be a mere coincidence, but it also suggests that the dissemination process may have been centrally organized by Luis de Santangel through channels he trusted.

It been suggested in recent years that the printed letter may not have been written in its entirety by the hand of Columbus, but rather was edited by a court official, probably Luis de Santangel. This is reinforced by the discovery of the Libro Copiador. The text in the printed Spanish and Latin editions is much cleaner and streamlined than the roaming prose of Columbus's letter to the monarchs found in the Libro Copiador. In particular, the printed editions omit practically all of Columbus's allusions to personal friction found in the manuscript—over the choice of ships, past treatment in the royal court, or the insubordination of the "one from Palos" (Martín Alonso Pinzón)—as well as Columbus's bizarre call for crusade in the Holy Land. The omission of these "distracting" points strongly suggests that there was another hand in the editing of the printed editions. And that this hand was probably a royal official, as these points could be construed as undignified or embarrassing to the crown.

This suggests that the printing of the Columbus letter, if not directly undertaken by royal command, probably had royal knowledge and approval. Its intent may have been to popularize and advance the Spanish case against the Portuguese claims. As noted before, these were being intensively negotiated in the papal court throughout 1493–94. If so, it is quite possible that Luis de Santangel was precisely that royal official, that he edited the content and oversaw the printing in Spain, and it was Santangel who sent a copy of the edited letter to Gabriel Sanchez who proceeded to disseminate it to his contacts in Italy to be translated into Latin and Italian and printed there. The peculiarities of the printed editions ("Catalanisms" in the spelling, the omission of Isabella) suggest this entire editing, printing and dissemination process was handled from the outset by Aragonese officials—like Santangel and Sanchez—rather than Castilians.

The small Spanish editions (and its subsequent disappearance) would be consistent with this thesis. To influence public opinion in Europe, and particularly the Church and the Pope, a Spanish version was not nearly as useful as a Latin one, so there was no purpose of continuing to print the Spanish edition once the Latin one became available. Indeed, there was no point in reprinting the Latin editions either, once the Treaty of Tordesillas was signed in June 1494. Thus, Columbus's letter serves as an early example of the harnessing of the new printing press by the State for propaganda purposes.

=== Settling the claims ===
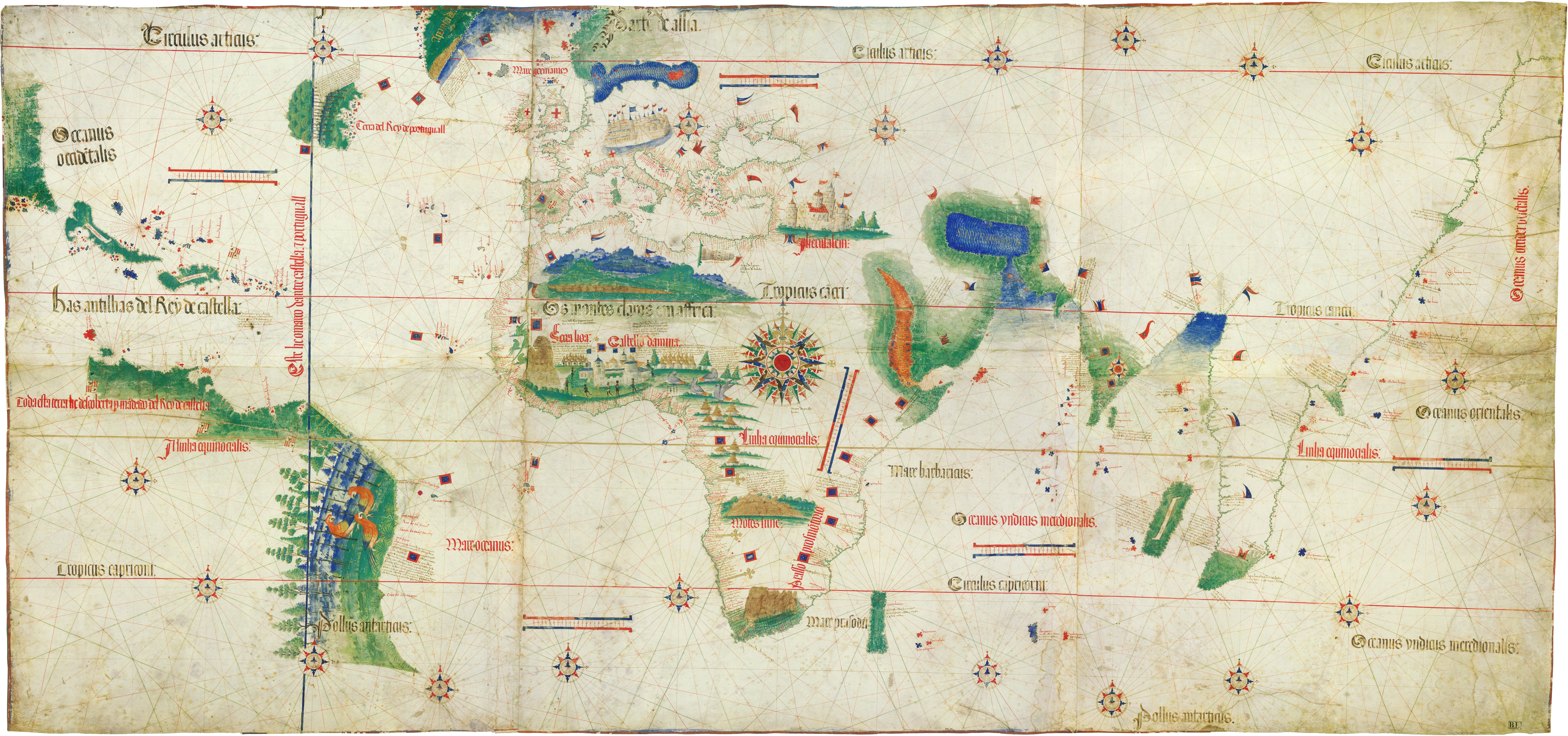
Cantino planisphere of 1502 shows the line of the 1494 Treaty of Tordesillas.

Christopher Columbus was probably correct to send the letter from Lisbon, for shortly after, King John II of Portugal indeed began to outfit a fleet to seize the discovered islands for the Kingdom of Portugal. The Portuguese king suspected (rightly, as it turns out) that the islands discovered by Columbus lay below the latitude line of the Canary Islands (approx. 27°50'), the boundary set by the 1479 Treaty of Alcáçovas as the area of Portuguese exclusivity (confirmed by the papal bull Aeterni regis of 1481).

Urgent reports on the Portuguese preparations were dispatched to the Spanish court by the Duke of Medina-Sidonia. Ferdinand II dispatched his own emissary, Lope de Herrera, to Lisbon to request the Portuguese to immediately suspend any expeditions to the west Indies until the determination of the location of those islands was settled (and if polite words failed, to threaten). Even before Herrera arrived John II had sent his own emissary, Ruy de Sande, to the Spanish court, reminding the Spanish monarchs that their sailors were not allowed to sail below Canaries latitude, and suggesting all expeditions to the west be suspended. Columbus, of course, was in the middle of preparing for his second journey.

Pope Alexander VI (an Aragonese national and friend of Ferdinand II) was brought into the fray to settle the rights to the islands and determine the limits of the competing claims. His first bull on the matter, Inter caetera, dated 3 May 1493, was indecisive. The pope assigned the Crown of Castile "all lands discovered by their envoys" (i.e. Columbus), so long as they are not possessed by any Christian owner (which Columbus's letter confirmed). On the other hand, the Pope also safeguarded the Portuguese claims by confirming their prior treaties and bulls ("no right conferred on any Christian prince is hereby understood as withdrawn or to be withdrawn"). Thus, on his first shot, the pope effectively left the matter unsettled until the determination of the islands' actual geographic location. (Note: although most of the negotiations were masterminded by Ferdinand II, who took a personal interest in the second voyage, the actual official claim of title on the islands belonged to his wife, Queen Isabella I. The rights, treaties and bulls pertain only to the Crown of Castile and Castilian subjects, and not to the Crown of Aragon or Aragonese subjects)

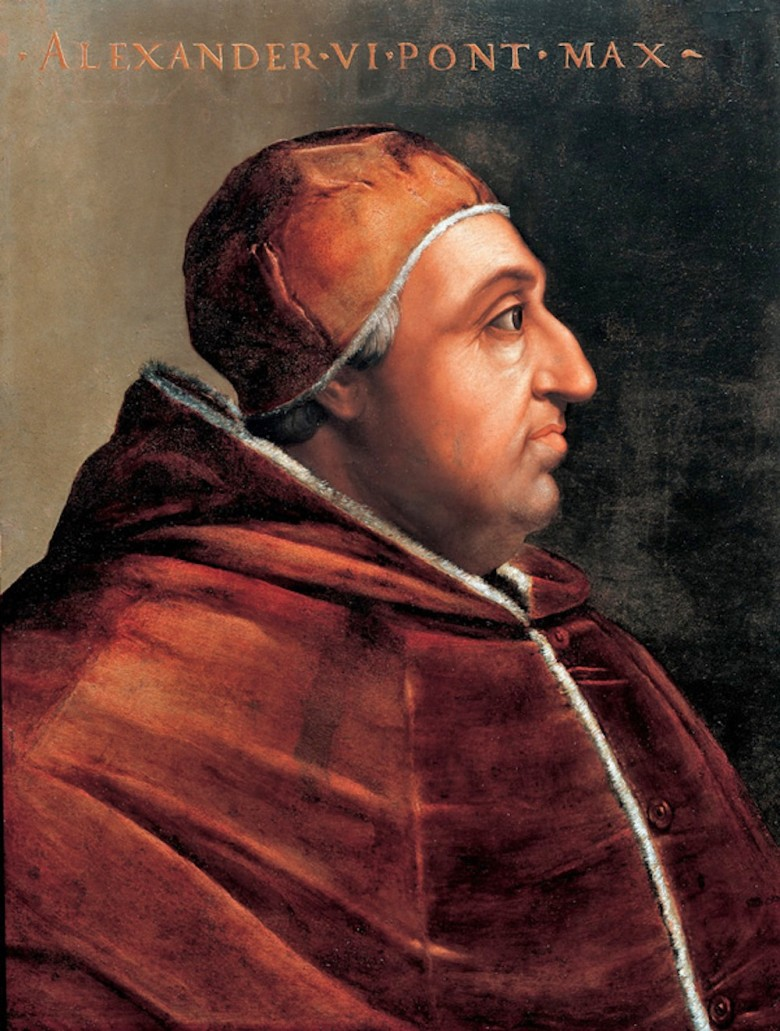
Pope Alexander VI, who settled that the islands discovered by Columbus belonged to the Crown of Castile.

It was apparently soon realized that the islands probably lay below the latitude boundary, as only a little while later, Pope Alexander VI issued a second bull Eximiae devotionis (officially dated also 3 May, but written c. July 1493), that tried to fix this problem by stealthily suggesting the Portuguese treaty applied to "Africa", and conspicuously omitting mention of the Indies. On his third attempt, in another bull also called Inter caetera, written in the summer and backdated to 4 May 1493, the Pope once again confirmed the Spanish claim on the Indies more explicitly with a longitude line of demarcation granting all lands 100 leagues west of Cape Verde (not merely those discovered by "her envoys") as the exclusive dominion of the Crown of Castile (with no explicit safeguards for prior Portuguese treaties or grants). (There is some confusion whether Eximiae devotionis preceded or followed the second Inter caetera; it is commonly supposed that the first Inter caetera (dated 3 May) was drafted in April and received in Spain on 17 May, and the second Inter caetera (dated 4 May) was drafted in June and received in Spain by 19 July (a copy was forwarded to Columbus in early August); while Eximiae diviones (dated 3 May) is normally assumed written sometime in July. In official time, Eximiae precedes the second Inter caetera, but in actual time may have actually followed it.)

It is uncertain exactly how the printed editions of the Columbus letter influenced this process. The letter reports the islands are located at 26°N which falls just below the Canary latitude, so the letter worked almost in Portugal's favor, and forced the pope into the geographical contortions of confirming Spanish possession without violating prior treaties. However, the increasing strength of the bulls over the summer, when the letter's circulation was at its height, suggests the Spanish case was ultimately helped rather than hurt by the letter. Minutiae over latitude degrees paled in insignificance with the excitement of the new discoveries revealed in the letters. While the Portuguese tried to paint Columbus as merely just another Spanish interloper, little more than a smuggler, illegally trying to trade in their waters, the letters presented him as a great discoverer of new lands and new peoples. The prospect of new souls ready to be converted, emphasized in the letters, and a Spanish crown eager to undertake the expense of that effort, must have swayed more than a few opinions.

Frustrated by the pope, John II decided to deal with the Spanish directly. The Portuguese envoys Pero Diaz and Ruy de Pina arrived in Barcelona in August, and requested that all expeditions be suspended until the geographical location of the islands was determined. Eager for a fait acompli, Ferdinand II played for time, hoping he could get Columbus out on his second voyage to the Indies before any suspensions were agreed to. As the king wrote Columbus (5 September 1493), the Portuguese envoys had no clue where the islands were actually located ("no vienen informados de lo que es nuestro").

On 24 September 1493, Christopher Columbus departed on his second voyage to the west Indies, with a massive new fleet. The Pope chimed in with yet another bull on the matter, Dudum siquidum, written in December but officially backdated 26 September 1493, where he went further than before, and gave Spain claim over any and all lands discovered by her envoys sailing west, in whatever hemisphere those lands happened to be. Dudum Siquidum had been issued with a second voyage in mind—should Columbus indeed reach China or India or even Africa on this trip, the lands discovered would come under the Spanish exclusive sphere.

Subsequent negotiations between the crowns of Portugal and Spain proceeded in Columbus's absence. They culminated in the Treaty of Tordesillas partitioning the globe between Spanish and Portuguese spheres of exclusivity at a longitude line 370 leagues west of Cape Verde (about 46°30' W). On the day the treaty was signed, 7 June 1494, Columbus was sailing along the southern shore of Cuba, prodding fruitlessly at that lengthy coast. On 12 June, Columbus gathered his crew on Evangelista island (what is now Isla de la Juventud), and had them all swear an oath, before a notary, that Cuba was not an island but indeed the mainland of Asia and that China could be reached overland from there.

== Editions of the letter ==
There are two known editions of the (Spanish) Letter to Santangel, and at least six editions of the (Latin) Letter to Gabriel Sanchez published in the first year (1493), plus an additional rendering of the narrative into Italian verse by Giuliano Dati (which went through five editions). Other than the Italian verse, the first foreign language translation was into German in 1497. In all, seventeen editions of the letter were published between 1493 and 1497. A manuscript copy of the letter to the Catholic monarchs, found in 1985, remained unprinted until recently.

=== Letter to Luis de Santangel (Spanish) ===
Written and printed in Spanish, usually assumed to be from the copy of the letter sent by Columbus to Luis de Santángel, the Escribano de Racion of the Crown of Aragon, although there is no addressee named (the letter is addressed merely to "Señor").

- 1. Barcelona edition, untitled, in folio, undated and printer unnamed. The existence of certain Catalan-influenced spellings it was from the outset presumed to be probably published in Barcelona. Some early historians assumed the printer to be Johan Rosenbach, but he has been more recently identified as probably Pere Posa of Barcelona on the basis of typographic similarity. The date of the edition is estimated to be late March or early April 1493. Only one copy from this edition has ever been found. It was discovered in 1889, in the catalog of the antiquarian dealer J. Maisonneuve in Paris, and was sold for the exorbitant price of 65,000 francs to the British collector Bernard Quaritch. After publishing a facsimile edition and translation in 1893, Quaritch sold the original copy to the Lenox Library, which is now part of the New York Public Library, where it remains.
- 2. Ambrosian edition, in quarto, date, printer name and location are unspecified. It is sometimes assumed that it was printed sometime after 1493 in Naples or somewhere in Italy, because of the frequent interpolation of the letters i and j (common in Italian, but not in Spanish); but others insisted it was printed in Spain; a more recent analysis has suggested it was printed in Valladolid around 1497 by Pedro Giraldi and Miguel de Planes (the first Italian, the second Catalan, which may explain the interpolation). Only one copy is known, discovered in 1856 at the Biblioteca Ambrosiana in Milan. The Ambrosian letter was originally in the possession of Baron Pietro Custodi until it was deposited, along with the rest of his papers, at the Biblioteca Ambrosiana in 1852 after his death. After its discovery, a transcription was published in 1863, and a facsimile in 1866.

Neither of these editions are mentioned by any writers before the 19th century, nor have any other copies been found, which suggests they were very small printings, and that the publication of Columbus's letter may have been suppressed in Spain by royal command.

The existence of the Latin letter to Gabriel Sanchez was known long before the existence of the Spanish letter to Santangel. The Latin editions do not contain the codicil about the letter being sent to the "Escribano de Racion", so there was hardly a trace of its existence before the first copy (the Ambrosian edition) was found in 1856.

In retrospect, however, some hints are given earlier. Columbus's son Ferdinand Columbus, in making an account of his own library, listed a tract with the title Lettera Enviada al Escribano de Racion a 1493: en Catalan. This may have been a reference to the Barcelona edition of Columbus's letter to Santangel. It is likely that Andrés Bernáldez, chaplain of Seville, may have had or seen a copy (manuscript or printed) of the Spanish letter to Santangel, and paraphrased it in his own Historia de los Reyes Católicos (written at the end of the 15th century).

The Spanish historian Martín Fernández de Navarrete was the first to definitively find a copy of the Spanish letter in the royal archives of Simancas and to identify Luis de Santangel as the recipient. Navarrete published a transcription of the Spanish letter in his famous 1825 Colección. However, Navarrete's transcription is not based on an original 15th-century edition (which he never claimed to have seen) but rather on a hand-written copy made in 1818 by Tomás González, an archivist at Simancas. Gonzalez's copy has since been lost, and exists now only in the Navarrete transcription. It is uncertain exactly what edition or manuscript González copied (although some of the tell-tale mistakes of the Barcelona edition are repeated).

The Brazilian historian Francisco Adolfo de Varnhagen found another hand-written copy of the Spanish letter to Santangel among the papers of the Colegio Mayor de Cuenca in Salamanca. This copy contains a significantly different ending, "Fecha en la carabela, sobre la Isla de S.a Maria, 18 de Febrero de 93." ("written on the caravel, on the island of Santa Maria, 18 February 1493"). The date (18 February) and the identification of the Azores island of Santa Maria (rather than the Canaries) are anomalies not normally found in other editions of the Letter to Santangel. It also lacks the Lisbon post-script and the note about it being sent to the Escriban de la Racion. The Cuenca copy also had a cover title "Carta del Almirante á D. Gabriel Sanches". As a result, Varnhagen originally conjectured this may very well have been the original Spanish copy that was translated by Leander de Cosco into Latin, and found its way to Rome. However, modern historians believe this is in fact a later copy of the Barcelona or Ambrosian editions, and that the anomalies exist because the copyist endeavored to correct mistakes and errors in the Spanish letter in light of the later editions and published histories of the Indies by Peter Martyr, Ferdinand Columbus, etc. The original Cuenca manuscript used by Varnhagen has since disappeared.

It is generally accepted that the Barcelona edition is prior to the Ambrosian one. The Barcelona edition is replete with small errors (e.g., "veinte" instead of "xxxiii" days) and Catalan-style spellings (which Columbus would not have used), suggesting it was carelessly copied and hurriedly printed. The Ambrosian edition seems to correct most of these mistakes, although it also makes a few new mistakes of its own. Navarrete's transcription makes some of the same mistakes as the Barcelona edition (e.g. veinte instead of xxxiii), but most of the spellings are in proper Castilian, although it is uncertain how much of this was in the original, and how much was massaged by Gonzalez or Navarrete in their transcriptions. While all the Spanish editions are very close to each other, historians believe they are not merely corrected reprints of each other, but that all derive independently (or at least in consultation with) an unknown prior edition or manuscript. Because of the "Almirante" signature and other clues, it is believed that all the Spanish editions are probably indirect, that is, that they were probably not directly copied from Columbus's original manuscript letter, but are themselves copies of earlier unknown copies or editions.

The simplicity and rarity of the original printed editions of the Letter to Santangel (only two copies are known to exist) has made it appealing to forgers, and there have been repeated attempts to sell fake copies of the letter to libraries and collectors. In one famous case, an Italian forger attempted to sell a copy to the New York Public Library. When the librarians refused to buy it, the forger angrily tore up the volume in front of them and stormed out. The librarians fished the pieces out of the wastepaper basket and put it back together; it is currently held as a curiosity by the New York Public Library.

=== Letter to Gabriel Sanchez (Latin) ===
The first printed edition of the Latin translation of Columbus's letter was probably printed in Rome by the printer Stephen Plannck, c. May 1493. Most other early Latin editions are reprints of that edition. The title is given as De Insulis Indiae supra Gangem nuper inventis ("Of the islands of India beyond the Ganges, recently discovered"), and contains a prologue noting that it was sent by Christopher Columbus to "Raphael Sanxis" (later editions correct it to "Gabriel Sanchez"), the treasurer of the Crown of Aragon. Its opening salutation hails Ferdinand II of Aragon (later editions also add mention of Isabella I of Castile) and identifies the translator as the notary "Aliander de Cosco" (later editions correct it to "Leander de Cosco"), noting that he finished translating it on 29 April 1493 ("third calends of May"). In full, the opening of the first Roman edition reads:

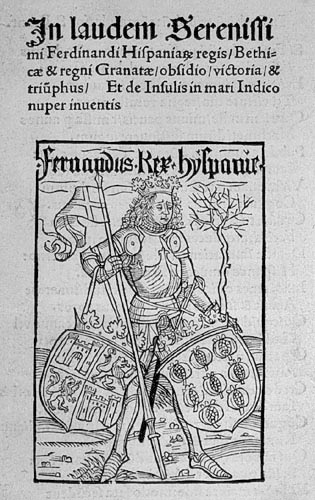
Image of King Ferdinand II of Aragon, on the cover the Latin edition of Columbus's letter, published in Basel in July 1494 (second Basel ed.)

Epistola Christofori Colom: cui (a)etas nostra multum debet: de Insulis Indi(a)e supra Gangem nuper inventis, ad quas perquirendas, octavo antea mense, auspicijs et (a)ere invictissimi Fernandi Hispaniarum Regis missus fuerat: ad Magnificum d(omi)n(u)m Raphaelem Sanxis: eiusdem serenissi Regis Thesaurarium missa: quam nobilis ac litteratus vir Aliander de Cosco ab Hispano ideomate in latinum convertit: tertio kal(enda)s Maii, M.cccc.xciii, Pontificatus Alexandri Sexti, Anno primo.

("Letter of Christopher Columbus, to whom our age is much indebted, about the islands of India beyond the Ganges recently discovered, and to explore which he had been sent eight months before under the auspices and at the expense of the most invincible Ferdinand, King of Spain; to the magnificent lord Raphael Sanxis, Treasurer to the Most Serene King, which the noble and literate notary Aliander de Cosco converted from the Spanish language into Latin, third calends of May 1493, during the first year of the pontificate of Alexander VI.")

The corrections (Ferdinand & Isabella, Gabriel Sanchez, Leander de Cosco) were undertaken in the Second and Third Roman editions later that same year, possibly as a result of complaints by Castilian emissaries in Rome who felt their Queen (and spellings) were given short-shrift by the Aragonese.

All the Latin editions omit the endings found in the Spanish edition to Santangel—i.e., they omit the sign-off of being written on board ship in the Canaries, the postscript about the storm and days it took to return and the codicil about the letter being sent to the Escribano de Racion and the Catholic monarchs. Instead, it simply signs off "Lisbon, the day before the Ides of March" ("Ulisbone, pridie Idus Martii", that is, on 14 May). Columbus's signature is given as "Christoforus Colom Oceanice classis Præfectus" ("Christopher Columbus, Prefect (or Admiral) of the Ocean fleet"). At the end, there is a verse epigram in honor of Ferdinand II written by Leonardus de Corbaria, Bishop of Monte Peloso.

For a long time, historians believed the Latin edition was based on the copy of the letter sent by Columbus to the Catholic monarchs (as mentioned at the end of the Spanish letter to Santangel), and that Columbus's address to the treasurer Gabriel Sanchez was merely a courtly formality. According to this account, Columbus's original letter was read (in Spanish) before the monarchs then holding court in Barcelona, and then Ferdinand II of Aragon (or his treasurer Gabriel Sanchez) ordered it translated into Latin by the notary Leander de Cosco, who completed the translation by 29 April 1493 (as noted in the prologue). The manuscript was subsequently carried (or received) by the Neapolitan prelate Leonardus de Corbaria, Bishop of Monte Peloso, who took it to Rome and arranged for its printing there with Stephanus Plannck, ca. May 1493. The Roman edition was subsequently carried into Central Europe and reprinted in Basel (twice, 1493 and 1494), Paris (three times in 1493) and Antwerp (once, 1493). A corrected Roman edition was printed by two different publishers in late 1493—one by Stephen Plannck again, the other by Frank Silber (known as Argenteus).

- 3. First Roman edition, De insulis indiae supra Gangem nuper inventis, undated and unnamed, but assumed printed by Stephanus Plannck in Rome (on basis of typographical similarity) probably May 1493. Plain text, bereft of the ornaments or stamps typical of the time, it has the appearance of being hurriedly printed, and was probably the first of the Latin editions. Opening salutation hails only Ferdinand II of Aragon ("invitissimi Fernandi Hispaniarum Regis"), conspicuously neglecting Isabella I of Castile; it refers to addressee as "Raphael Sanxis" (wrong first name, surname spelled in Catalan), and to the translator as "Aliander de Cosco". It was published in quarto, four leaves (34 lines per page).
- 4. First Basel edition, De Insulis inventis. It is the only early edition missing the phrase "Indie supra Gangem" in the title, substituting instead "Insulis in mari Indico" ("islands in the Indian Sea"). Otherwise, it seems to be a reprint of the first Roman edition (hails only Ferdinand II, spells Raphael Sanxis, Aliander de Cosco). It is the first edition with illustrative woodcuts – eight of them. Two of the woodcuts ("Oceana Classis" and the Indian canoe/galley) were plagiarized from earlier woodcuts for a different book. This edition is undated, without printer name nor location given, but it is often assumed to have been printed in Basel largely because a later edition (1494) printed in that city used the same woodcuts. Some have speculated the printer of this edition to have been Johannes Besicken or Bergmann de Olpe. It was published in octavo, ten leaves (27 lines per page).
- 5. First Paris edition, Epistola de insulis repertis de novo, directly from the first Roman edition (hails only Ferdinand II, Raphael Sanxis, Aliander de Cosco). Title page has woodcut of angel appearing unto shepherds. Undated and printer unnamed, but location given as "Impressa parisius in campo gaillardi" (Champ-Gaillard in Paris, France). The printer is unnamed, but a later reprint that same year identifies him as Guyot Marchant. In quarto, four leaves (39 lines per page).
- 6. Second Paris edition, Epistola de insulis de novo repertis probably by Guyot Marchant of Paris. Straight reprint of first Paris edition.
- 7. Third Paris edition, Epistola de insulis noviter repertis. Reprint of prior Paris edition, but this one has large printer's device on the back of the title page, identifying Guyot Marchant as the printer (ergo the deduction that the two prior editions were also by him).
- 8. Antwerp edition, De insulis indi(a)e supra Gangem nuper inve(n)tis by Thierry Martins in Antwerp, 1493, directly from first Roman edition.
- 9. Second Roman edition, De insulis indi(a)e supra Gangem nuper inve(n)tis, undated and printer unnamed, assumed to be again by Stephen Plannck in Rome because of typographic similarity (identical to first edition). This is a corrected edition, presumably put out in late 1493; the salutation now refers to both Ferdinand and Isabella ("invictissimorum Fernandi et Helisabet Hispaniarum Regum"), addressee's name given as "Gabriel Sanchis" (correct first name, surname now in half-Catalan, half-Castilian spelling) and the translator as "Leander de Cosco" (rather than Aliander). It is published in quarto, four leaves (33 lines per page).
- 10. Third Roman edition, De insulis indi(a)e supra Gangem nuper inve(n)tis by the Roman printer Franck Silber (who was known as "Eucharius Argenteus"). It is the first edition to be explicitly dated and inscribed with the printer's name: the colophon reads "Impressit Rome Eucharius Argenteus Anno dni M.cccc.xciij". It is also a corrected edition: it refers to addressee as "Gabriel Sanches" (Castilian name), the translator as "Leander de Cosco" and salutes both Ferdinand & Isabella. It is uncertain whether this Silber edition precedes or follows Plannck's second edition. It is published in three unnumbered leaves, one blank (40 lines to the page).
- 11. Second Basel edition, De insulis nuper in mar Indico repertis, dated and named, printed by Johann Bergmann in Basel, 21 April 1494. This is a reprint of the first Basel edition (uses four of the six woodcuts). This edition was published as an appendix to a prose drama, Historia Baetica by Carolus Verardus, a play about the 1492 conquest of Granada.

=== Italian verse and German translations ===
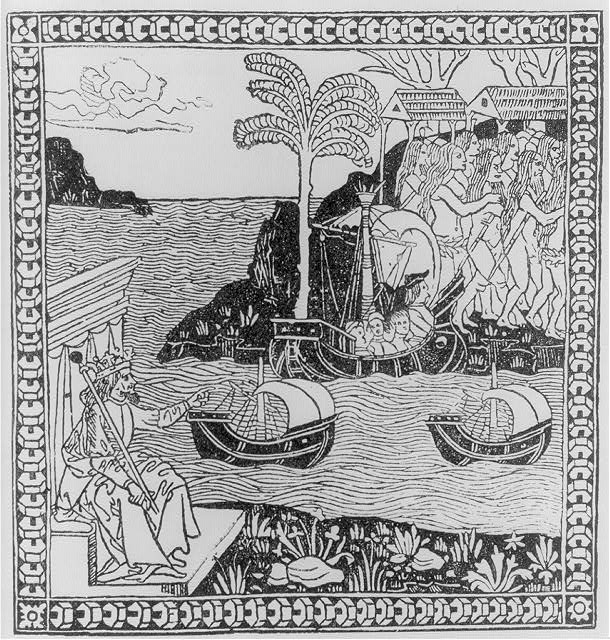
Woodcut on the title page of the Italian verse edition by Giuliano Dati, published in Florence, October 1493 (second ed.).

The Latin letter to Gabriel Sanchez, either the first or second Roman editions, was translated into Italian ottava rima by Giuliano Dati, a popular poet of the time, at the request of Giovanni Filippo dal Legname, secretary to Ferdinand II. The first edition of the Italian verse edition was published in June 1493, and went quickly through an additional four editions, suggesting this was probably the most popular form of the Columbus letter known at least to the Italian public. A translation of the Latin letter into German prose was undertaken in 1497.

- 12. First Italian verse edition, La lettera delle isole novamente trovata, First edition of the Italian verse version by Giuliano Dati, published by Eucharius Silber in Rome, and explicitly dated 15 June 1493.
- 13. Second Italian verse edition, La lettera dell'isole che ha trovate novamente il re dispagna, revised verse translation by Giuliano Dati, printed in Florence by Laurentius de Morganius and Johann Petri, dated 26 October 1493. It has a famous woodcut on its title page, which was later re-used for a 1505 edition of Amerigo Vespucci's Letter to Soderini.
- 14. Third Italian verse edition, Questa e la hystoria delle inventioe delle diese isole Cannaria in Indiane, reprint of Dati verse edition. Undated and printing location unknown.
- 15. Fourth Italian verse edition, La lettera dell'isole che ha trovata novamente, reprint of Dati verse, by Morganius and Petri in Florence, dated 26 October 1495.
- 16. Fifth Italian verse edition, Isole trovate novamente per el Re di Spagna, reprint of Dati verse, undated and unnamed (post-1495), lacks title woodcut.
- 17. German translation, Ein schön hübsch lesen von etlichen Inslen, translated into German in Strassburg, printed by Bartholomeus Kistler, dated 30 September 1497.

=== Italian translation fragments ===
There are three manuscripts of incomplete attempts by Italian authors to translate the narrative Spanish (or perhaps Latin) letter into Italian prose, probably within 1493. The three fragments were first published by Cesare de Lollis in the Raccolta Colombiana of 1894.

- 18. First Italian fragment manuscript translation into Italian, held at the Biblioteca Ambrosiana in Milan. The Italian translator's note claims this to be a copy of a letter written by Columbus "to certain counsellors" ("ad certi consieri") in Spain, and forwarded by "the treasurer" (i.e. Gabriel Sanchez) to his brother, "Juan Sanchez" (named in the text), a merchant in Florence.
- 19. Second Italian fragment manuscript fragment held at the Biblioteca Nazionale Centrale in Florence. The Italian translator simply notes that it is a copy of the "letter that came from Spain" ("copia della letera venuta di Spagna"). There is a close connection between this Florentine fragment and the first Latin edition, suggesting one is derived from the other, or they were both using the same Spanish document.
- 20. Third Italian fragment manuscript fragment held also by the Biblioteca Nazionale Centrale in Florence. It contains no translator's notes about its origin or provenance.

It might be worth noting here that the first known French translation appeared in Lyon in 1559, in a volume by Charles Fontaine. The first known English translation appeared in the Edinburgh Review in 1816.

=== Letter to the Catholic monarchs (Libro Copiador) ===
The existence of this manuscript letter was unknown until it was discovered in 1985. The manuscript letter was found as part of a collection known as the Libro Copiador, a book containing manuscript copies of nine letters written by Columbus to the Catholic Monarchs, with dates ranging from 4 March 1493, to 15 October 1495, copied by the hand of a writer in the late 16th century. Seven of these nine letters were previously unknown. Its discovery was announced in 1985 by an antiquarian book dealer in Tarragona. It was acquired in 1987 by the Spanish government and is currently deposited at the Archivo General de Indias in Seville. A facsimile edition was published in Rumeu de Armas (1989). A transcription and English translation can be found in Zamora (1993).

Although scholars have tentatively embraced the Libro Copiador as probably authentic, it is still in the early stages of careful and critical scrutiny, and should be treated a bit cautiously. The first letter in the copybook purports to be a copy of the original letter sent by Christopher Columbus to the Catholic Monarchs from Lisbon announcing the discovery. If authentic, it is prior to the Barcelona edition, indeed it precedes all known versions of the letter. It contains significant differences from both the Spanish letter to Santangel and the Latin letter to Sanchez—notably more details about Indian reports, including previously unmentioned native names of islands (specifically: "Cuba", "Jamaica", "Boriquen" and "Caribo"), and a strange proposal to use the revenues from the Indies to launch a crusade to conquer Jerusalem. It omits some of the more economic-oriented details of the printed editions. If authentic, this letter practically solves the "Sanchez problem": it confirms that the Latin letter to Gabriel Sanchez is not a translation of the letter that the Spanish codicil said Columbus sent to the Monarchs, and strongly suggests that the Sanchez letter is just a Latin translation of the letter Columbus sent to Luis de Santangel.

== Thefts, forgeries and return of books ==
Many of the copies were cloned via forgery from stolen copies from various libraries, including the Vatican Library. These were sold to collectors and other libraries, who were innocently duped by the fraud. The Vatican's copy was returned in January 2020. The forgeries and thefts were the subject of intense international investigations and forensic reports. Other suspected thefts, forgeries and sales are still being examined.

== Online editions ==
- The Spanish letter of Columbus to Luis de Sant' Angel, Escribano de Racion of the Kingdom of Aragon, dated 15 February 1493, 1893 edition, London: Quaritch.: facsimile and transcription of the Barcelona edition of 1493, with English translation by M.P. Kerney. For an html version of the same letter, see transcription, with English translation at King's College London. (accessed 12 February 2012).
- Lettera in lingua spagnuola diretta da Cristoforo Colombo a Luis de Santangel (15 febbrajo 14 marzo 1493), riproddotta a fascimili, Gerolamo d'Adda, editor, 1866, Milan: Laengner, contains a facsimile of the Ambrosian edition of the Spanish letter to Santangel. Lettere autografe di Cristoforo Colombo nuovamente stampate. G.Daelli, editor, 1863 (with foreword by Cesare Correnti), Milan: Daelli, contains the first transcription (in Spanish) and an Italian translation of the Ambrosian edition.
- Historia de los Reyes Católicos D. Fernando y Da Isabel: crónica inédita del siglo XV, 1856 ed., Granada: Zamora, written at the end of the 15th century by Andrés Bernáldez contains what seems like a paraphrasing of Columbus's letter to Santangel, Vol. 1, Ch. CXVIII, (pp. 269–77).
- "Carta del Almirante Cristobal Colon, escrita al Escribano de Racion de los Señores Reyes Catolicos", in Colección de los viages y descubrimientos que hicieron por mar los españoles desde fines del siglo XV, Martín Fernández de Navarrete, 1825, vol. 1, Madrid: pp. 167–75, is the first known modern publication of the Spanish letter to Santangel. Navarrete's transcription is based on a copy (now lost) originally copied by Tomas Gonzalez from an unknown edition (also lost) at the royal archives of Simancas in 1818.
- Primera Epístola del Almirante Don Cristóbal Colón dando cuenta de su gran descubrimiento á D. Gabriel Sánchez, tesorero de Aragón, edited by "Genaro H. de Volafan" (pseudonym of Francisco Adolfo de Varnhagen), 1858, Valencia: Garin. Contains the only transcription of a Spanish manuscript of the letter found by Varnhagen at the Colegio Mayor de Cuencas (manuscript since lost). It is accompanied bilingually by the transcription of the Latin from the third Roman (Silber) edition of 1493.
- The Latin letter of Columbus: printed in 1493 and announcing the discovery of America, Bernard Quaritch, editor, 1893, London: contains facsimile of the second Roman edition (Plannck) of 1493; no transcription nor English translation provided.
- "A Letter addressed to the noble Lord Raphael Sanchez, &tc.", in R.H. Major, editor, 1848, Select Letters of Christopher Columbus, with other original documents relating to his four voyages to the New World. London: Hakluyt, (pp. 1–17) contains bilingually a Latin transcription and English translation of the third Roman (Silber) edition.
- "La Lettera dellisole che ha trovato nuovamente il Re Dispagna", Italian verse translation by Giuliano Dati, from Florence edition (October 1493), transcribed (without translation) in R.H. Major (1848: pp. lxxiii–xc).
- "The Columbus Letter: Concerning the Islands Recently Discovered in the Indian Sea", at the University of Southern Maine: facsimile, Latin transcription and English translation, of the 1494 second Basel edition, with introduction and comments by Matthew H. Edney (1996, rev.2009), at the Osher Map Library, Smith Center for Cartographic Education, University of Southern Maine (accessed 12 February 2012).
- "Carta a los Reyes de 4 Marzo 1493", Spanish transcription and English translation, of the manuscript letter to the Catholic Monarchs, from the Libro Copiador, reproduced in Margarita Zamora (1993) Reading Columbus, Berkeley: University of California press. (online at UC Pres E-Books collection, accessed 12 February 2012).

== Bibliography ==
- D'Adda, Gerolamo, editor, (1866) Lettera in lingua spagnuola diretta da Cristoforo Colombo a Luis de Santangel (15 febbrajo – 14 marzo 1493), riproddotta a fascimili, Milan: Laengner. online.
- Adler, Joseph (1998) "Christopher Columbus's Voyage of Discovery: Jewish and New Christian Elements", Midstream. As found online, accessed 12 February 2012.
- Anzovin, Steven (2000) Famous First Facts, New York: H. W. Wilson Company, ISBN 0-8242-0958-3
- Arranz Márquez, Luis (2006) Cristóbal Colón: misterio y grandeza. Madrid: Marcial Pons.
- Bernáldez, Andrés Historia de los Reyes Católicos D. Fernando y Da Isabel: crónica inédita del siglo XV, 1856 ed., Granada: Zamora. vol. 1
- Las Casas, Bartolomé de (c. 1561) Historia de las Indias, 1875–76 ed., Madrid: Ginesta vol. 1; Columbus's journal portion (Lib. I, Chapters 35 to 75) are translated into English by C. R. Markham, 1893, The Journal of Christopher Columbus (during his first voyage, 1492–93), London: Hakluyt. online
- Clough, C. H. (1994) "The New World and the Italian Renaissance", in C. H. Clough and P. E. H. Hair, editors, The European Outthrust and Encounter: the first phase c. 1400 – c. 1700: essays in tribute to David Beers Quinn on his 85th birthday. Liverpool, UK: Liverpool University Press. pp. 291–328.
- Columbus, Ferdinand (1892) Historia del almirante Don Cristobal Colon en la cual se da particular y verdadera relacion de su vida y de sus hechos, y del descubrimiento de las Indias Occidentales, llamadas Nuevo-mundo, 1892 edition, Madrid: Minnesa. 2 volumes, v.1, v. 2
- Correnti, Cesare (1863) "Discorso" in G. Daelli, editor, Lettere autografe di Cristoforo Colombo nuovamente stampate. Milan: Daelli. online.
- Curtis, William Eleroy (1893) The Relics of Columbus: an illustrated description of the historical collection in the monastery of La Rabida. Washington, DC: Lowdermilk. online
- Davenport, F. G. (1917), editor, European treaties bearing on the history of the United States and its dependencies to 1648, Washington: Carnegie Institution. online
- Davies, Hugh W. (1911) Bernhard von Breydenback and his Journey to the Holy Land, 1483–4. London: Leighton online
- Davidson, Miles H. (1997) Columbus Then and Now, a life re-examined. Norman: University of Oklahoma Press.
- Diaz-Trechuelo, Lourdes (2006) Cristóbal Colón, 2nd ed. (1st. ed. 1992), Madrid: Palabra.
- Edney, Matthew H. (1996, rev.2009), "The Columbus Letter: The Diffusion of Columbus's Letter through Europe, 1493–1497" online at the Osher Map Library, Smith Center for Cartographic Education, University of Southern Maine (accessed 12 February 2012).
- Harrisse, Henri (1865) Notes on Columbus. New York: Barlow.
- Harrisse, Henri (1866) Bibliotheca Americana Vetustissima: a description of works relating to America published between the years 1492 and 1551. New York: Philes. online
- Henige, David (1994) "Finding Columbus: Implications of a newly discovered text". In C. H. Clough and P. E. H. Hair, editors, The European Outthrust and Encounter: the first phase c. 1400 – c. 1700 : essays in tribute to David Beers Quinn on his 85th birthday. Liverpool, UK: Liverpool University Press, pp. 141–66.
- Ife, Barry W. (1992) "Introduction to the Letters from America", King's College London. online (accessed 12 February 2012).
- Jane, Cecil (1930) "The Letter of Columbus Announcing the Success of his First Voyage", Hispanic American Historical Review, Vol. 10 (1), pp. 33–50.
- Josephy, A. M. (1968) The Indian Heritage of America 1991, ed., New York: Houghton Mifflin.
- Lea, Henry Charles (1906) A History of the Inquisition in Spain. 4 volumes, New York: Macmillan. v.1
- De Lollis, Cesare (1894), editor, Scritti di Cristoforo Colombo, vol. 1, part 1, of Raccolta di Documenti e Studi pubblicati dalla Reale Commissione Colombiana pel quarto Centenario della scoperta dell'America. Rome: Ministero della Pubblica Istruzione.
- Major, Richard H. (1848) Select Letters of Christopher Columbus, with other original documents relating to his four voyages to the New World. London: Hakluyt. online
- Morison, S. E. (2007) Admiral of the Ocean Sea: A Life of Christopher Columbus. Read Books. ISBN 1-4067-5027-1 (1st. ed. 1942, Boston: Little Brown).
- March, K. and K. Passman (1993) "The Amazon Myth and Latin America" in W. Haase and M. Reinhold, editors, The Classical Tradition and the Americas. Berlin: De Gruyter, pp. 285–338.
- Muñoz, Juan Bautista (1793) Historia del Nuevo Mundo, Madrid: Ibarra. v. 1
- Navarrete, Martín Fernández de (1825–37) Colección de los viages y descubrimientos que hicieron por mar los españoles desde fines del siglo XV: con varios documentos inéditos concernientes á la historia de la marina castellana y de los establecimientos españoles en Indias, 4 vols., Madrid: Imprensa Real.v.1 (1825), v.2, v. 3 (1829)
- Quaritch, Bernard (1893) "Preface" in The Spanish letter of Columbus to Luis de Sant' Angel, Escribano de Racion of the Kingdom of Aragon, dated 15 February 1493, London: Quaritch. online
- Ramos Pérez, Demetrio (1983) La carta de Colón sobre el descubrimiento del Nuevo Mundo. Diputación provincial de Granada
- Ramos Pérez, Demetrio (1986) La primera noticia de América. Valladolid: Casa-Museo de Colón.
- Rumeu de Armas, A., editor, (1989) Libro Copiador de Cristóbal Colón: correspondencia inédita con los Reyes Católicos sobre los viajes a América, fascimil y transcripcion. 2 volumes. Madrid: Testimonio.
- Sabin, J. (1871) Bibliotheca Americana: A dictionary of books relating to America, from its discovery to the present time, Volume 4, pp. 274–78
- Sanz López, Carlos. (1959) El gran secreto de la Carta de Colón: crítica histórica y otras adiciónes a la Bibliotheca Americana vetustissima. Madrid: V. Suarez
- Sanz López, Carlos (1961) La Carta de D. Cristobal Colón; anunciando el descubrimiento del Nuevo Mundo, 15 febrero–14 marzo de 1493. Madrid: Gráficas Yagües.
- Thatcher, J. B. (1903) Christopher Columbus: his life, his works, his remains, as revealed by original printed and manuscript records, 2 vols, New York: Putnam. v. 2
- Uchamany, E. A. (1993) "The Periodization of the History of the New Christians and Crypto-Jews in Spanish America" in Y. K. Stillman and G. K. Zucker, editors, New Horizons in Sephardic Studies. Albany: State University of New York Press, pp. 109–36.
- Varnhagen, F. A. (using pseudonym "Genaro H. de Volafan"), editor (1858), Primera Epístola del Almirante Don Cristóbal Colón dando cuenta de su gran descubrimiento á D. Gabriel Sánchez, tesorero de Aragón. Valencia: Garin. online.
- Varela, Consuelo, ed. (1986) Cristobal Colon: Los cuatro viajes, testamento. Madrid.
- Winsor, J. (1891) Christopher Columbus and how he received and imparted the spirit of discovery. Boston: Houghton-Mifflin. online
- Zamora, Margarita (1993) Reading Columbus. Berkeley: University of California Press online
