= Catechism =

Summary or exposition of doctrine

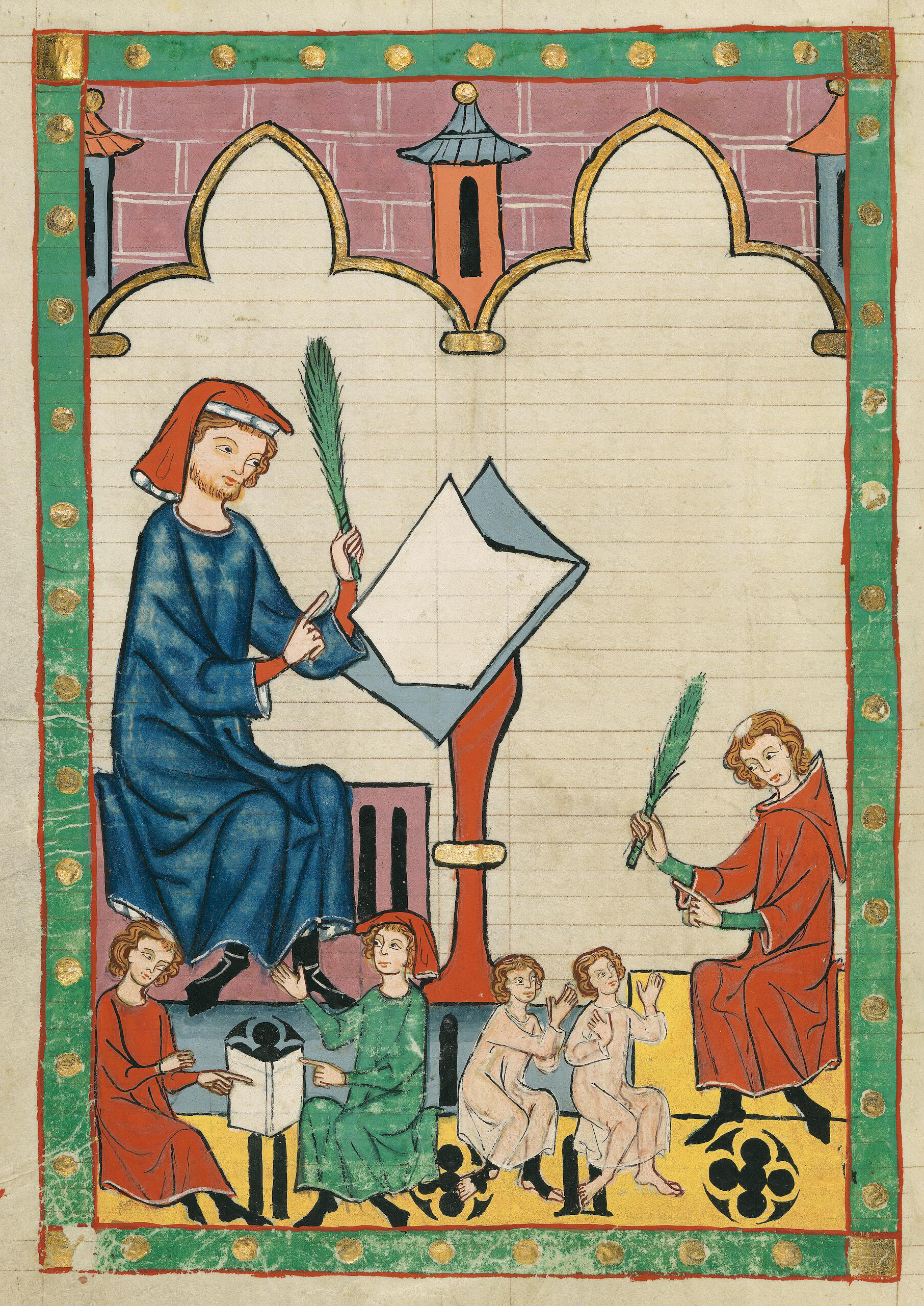
Codex Manesse, fol. 292v, "The Schoolmaster of Esslingen" (Der Schulmeister von Eßlingen)

A catechism ( /ˈkætəˌkɪzəm/; from Ancient Greek: κατηχέω, "to teach orally") is a summary or exposition of doctrine and serves as a learning introduction to the Sacraments traditionally used in catechesis, or Christian religious teaching of children and adult converts. As Daniel R. Hyde has shown, this word is used in the New Testament (Luke 1:4; Acts 18:25; 21:2, 24; Rom. 2:18; 1 Cor. 14:19; Gal. 6:6) for the instruction of believers. Catechisms are doctrinal manuals—often in the form of set questions and answers to be memorized—a format that has been used in non-religious or secular contexts as well.

The term catechumen refers to the designated recipient of the catechetical work or instruction. In the Catholic Church, catechumens are those who are preparing to receive the Sacrament of Baptism. Traditionally, they would be placed separately during Holy Mass from those who had been baptized, and would be dismissed from the liturgical assembly before the Profession of Faith (Nicene Creed) and General Intercessions (Prayers of the Faithful).

Catechisms are characteristic of Western Christianity but are also present in Eastern Christianity. In 1973, The Common Catechism, the first joint catechism of Catholics and Protestants, was published by theologians of the major Western Christian traditions, as a result of extensive ecumenical dialogue.

== Format ==
Before the Protestant Reformation, Christian catechesis took the form of instruction in and memorization of the prayers and texts needed to participate in Christian liturgies: the Apostles' Creed, Lord's Prayer, Hail Mary and a fundamental understanding of the sacraments and of Faith, Hope and Charity. Catholic religious education was often directed to encouraging discipleship, such as the Acts of Bodily Mercy and of Spiritual Mercy, etc. more than being a detailed treatment of doctrine.

There were also more comprehensive documents that outlined the theology of the Christian faith, such as the Catechetical Lectures of St. Cyril of Jerusalem, "The Morals" of St. Basil of Caesarea, and the Enchiridion on Faith, Hope and Love by St. Augustine of Hippo. The earliest known catechism is the Didache, which was written between 60 and 85 AD. The word "catechism" for a manual for this instruction appeared in the Late Middle Ages.

The question-and-answer format calls upon two parties to participate, a master and a student (traditionally termed a "scholar"), or a parent and a child. The Westminster Shorter Catechism (1647) is an example:

Q. What is the chief end of man?

A. To glorify God and enjoy Him forever!

Q. What rule hath God given to direct us how we may glorify and enjoy Him?

A. The word of God which is contained in the Scriptures of the Old and New Testaments is the only rule to direct us how we may glorify and enjoy him.

== Catholic catechisms ==
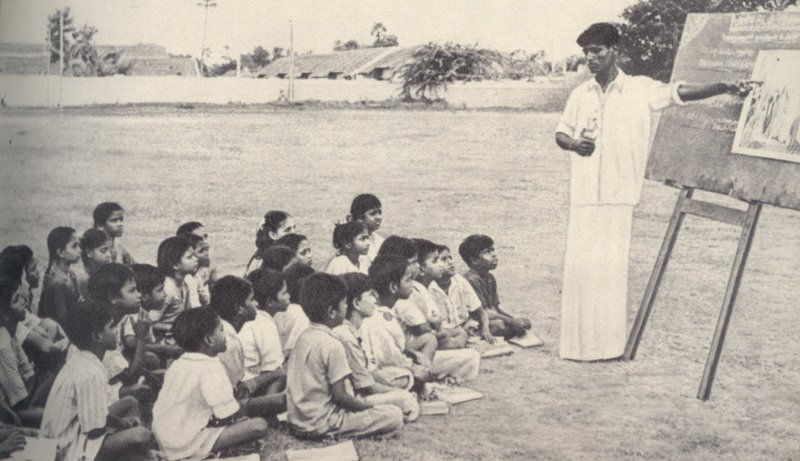
A catechism lesson in a Madras Presidency village (India), 1939

There are thousands of catechisms in the Catholic tradition, with texts already appearing in print for the instruction of lay people by the early medieval period.

Only two "universal" catechisms have been promulgated by the popes of the Catholic Church: The Catechism of the Council of Trent (1566), written chiefly for priests, and the Catechism of the Catholic Church (1992), written chiefly for bishops. These remain among the most widespread among Catholics today, although the latter has been met with some controversy since its first appearance.

For Catholics, all the canonical books of the Bible (including the Deuterocanonical books), the tradition of the Church and the interpretation of these by the living Magisterium (which may be accomplished in a catechism or other mode of teaching) constitute the entire means whereby God's revelation to mankind may be accessed. Catholics believe that sacred scripture and sacred tradition preserved and interpreted by the Magisterium are both necessary for attaining to the fullest understanding of all of God's revelation.

The term catechist is most frequently used in Catholicism, often to describe a lay catechist, a layperson with catechetical training who engages in such teaching and evangelization. This can be in both parish church and mission contexts.

=== Notable catechisms in history ===
Name	First published	Author	Notes
Constitutions of Peckham	c.1281	John Peckham, Archbishop of Canterbury	Latin. Priests were to instruct their flock four times a year on "the Creed, the ten commandments, the two precepts of the Gospel, viz. love to God and man, the seven works of mercy, the seven deadly sins, the seven cardinal virtues, and the seven sacraments of grace." So no priest could claim ignorance, Peckham wrote a catechism aimed at priests.
The Lay Folk's Catechism	c.1357	John de Gaitrik (or de Taystek) (Subsequent revision perhaps by John Wycliffe)	Middle English, versions in several Northern and Southern dialects for laity. Latin version for parish priests. Presented as blank verse, not Q&A format.
L'ABC des simples gens	c.1401	Jean Gerson	"ABC for simple folk": the common prayers, creed, commandments, etc. to be memorized as part of catechesis. Medieval French (langue d'oïl)
Small Catechism	1529	Martin Luther	Conventional key elements of Christian doctrine such as those found in the Decalogue, the Lord's Prayer, and the Apostles' Creed. Each topic was broken up into small sections, with the question "What does this mean?" following each portion.
Explanation of the Apostles' Creed	1530	Erasmus	A Catholic response to Luther's catechisms of the previous year. Anglicanized English version 1533 A Playne and Godly Exposition or Declaration of the Commune Crede
Summa Doctrinae Christianae	1555	Peter Canisius	For clergy, children, and adolescents respectively
Catechismus minimus	1556	Peter Canisius	For clergy, children, and adolescents respectively
Parvus Catechismus catholicorum	1559	Peter Canisius	For clergy, children, and adolescents respectively
An Honest Godlye Instruction	1556	Edmund Bonner	Reprinted in 2020 within Tradivox, Vol. I.
The Roman Catechism (or the Catechism of the Council of Trent)	1566	Various (Note: Various authors include Leonardo Marini, Muzio Calini, Egidio Foscarari, Francisco Foreiro, Charles Borromeo, & William Sirletus.)	Commissioned by the Council of Trent and was not intended for common use by the laity, but as a general use reference book for priests and bishops. There are two English translations. One by Theodore Buckley and the other by Rev. J Donovan.
A Catechisme of Christian Doctrine	1567	Laurence Vaux	First published in Louvain, six further editions in rapid succession, emanating from Antwerp and Liège, testified to its widespread popularity and effectiveness. The 1583 Liège issue was reprinted with biographical introduction for the Chetham Society by Thomas Graves Law in 1885. This edition contains also Vaux's paper "The Use and Meaning of Ceremonies," and a few further pages of instruction added by the Liège publisher. The catechism is practically formed on the same lines as its successor of today, explaining in sequence the Apostles' Creed, the Lord's Prayer and Hail Mary (excluding the second half beginning at "Holy Mary…"), the Ten Commandments (at considerable length), the Sacraments and the offices of Christian justice. The treatise on the ceremonies discusses the use of holy water, candles, incense, vestments and so forth. According to the 1913 Catholic Encyclopedia, Laurence Vaux's Catechism was the first Reformation era Catholic Catechism in English when it was published in 1567. Reprints followed in 1574, 1583, 1599 and 1605.
The Christian Doctrine	1573	Fr. Diego de Ledesma	Reprinted in 2020 within Tradivox, Vol. I.
Catecismo de Ripalda	1591	Jerónimo de Ripalda	Doctrina cristiana, con una exposición breve de Jerónimo de Ripalda, SJ.
Astete	1599	Gaspar Astete	Doctrina cristiana y documentos de crianza.
A Shorte Catechisme	1614	Robert Bellarmine	Reprinted in 2020 within Tradivox, Vol. II.
Douay Catechism	1649	Rev Henry Tuberville, DD	Written at the English College of Douay in Flanders & is based on the Roman Catechism of the Council of Trent. It was similarly written with the purpose of teaching Christian doctrine during the tumultuous English Reformation. It is a testament to Rev. Tuberville and his colleagues at Douay that it remains one of the clearest and most direct compendiums of Catholic teaching in the English language.
Luz de verdades católicas	1691	Juan Martínez de la Parra	Luz de verdades catholicas y explicación de la doctrina christiana.
Einheitskatechismus	1777	Maria Theresa	Unified catechism for Habsburg monarchy.
Catéchisme impérial	1806	Napoleon	Unified catechism for France under Napoleon rule, the catechism emphasizes loyalty to the emperor.
El catecismo de la doctrina cristiana explicado	1837	Santiago José García Mazo	El catecismo de la doctrina cristiana explicado, ó, Explicaciones del Astete que convienen también al Ripalda.
A Complete Catechism of the Catholic Religion	1847	Joseph Deharbe	A popular German catechism, written by the Theologian Joseph Deharbe, which "possesses theological correctness, brevity of sentences, preciseness of expression, clearness, and good order... It is to Deharbe's credit that in his catechism he preserved catechetical tradition, but abandoned the Canisian division, arranging the text-matter under chapters on Faith, Commandments, and Means of Grace."
Baltimore Catechism	1885	Fr. Januarius De Concilio	Various editions of the Baltimore Catechism were the de facto standard Catholic school text in America from 1885 to the late 1960s. It was often taught by rote. The most common edition has a series of questions with their answers, which are followed by explanations in more depth. These are often accompanied by biblical quotes. There is a test at the end of every chapter.
Explicación del catecismo católico	1900	Ángel María de Arcos	Explicación del catecismo católico breve y sencilla por el R. P. Ángel María de Arcos.
Catechism of Saint Pius X	1908	Pope Pius X	It was issued by Pope Pius X at the beginning of the 20th century in Italian, with the intention that all Catholics could easily understand their faith.
Dutch Catechism	1966	Edward Schillebeeckx & Piet Schoonenberg, S.J.	The first comprehensive post-Vatican II Catholic catechism. It was commissioned and authorised by the Catholic hierarchy of the Netherlands, and in its foreword declares as its intention: "to make the message of Jesus Christ sound as new as it is." The catechism, a bestseller, was alleged to contain a number of problematic formulations. These were reviewed by a commission of cardinals, who alleged several significant shortcomings in the new catechism's presentation of Catholic doctrine. They were able, nonetheless, to "leave untouched by far the greatest part of the New Catechism," while offering their support for "the laudable purpose of the authors of the Catechism, namely, to present the eternal good tidings of Christ in a way adapted to the understanding and the thinking of the present day man."
Catechism of the Catholic Church	1992	Various	The first universal catechism issued since the Council of Trent in 1566. It contains articles on the classical topics of the official teaching of the Catholic Church on all matters of faith and morals. Since the official language of the Catholic Church is Latin, official teaching documents distributed in Latin are unlikely to change in perceived meaning over time. The Latin language version of the catechism, published 8 September 1997, is the editio typica—the normative and definitive text. The principal source materials for this work are the Sacred Scriptures, the Church Fathers, the liturgy, and the Magisterium. This catechism is intended to serve "as a point of reference for the catechisms or compendia that are composed in the various countries." – Extraordinary Synod of Bishops 1985, Final Report II B a, 4. Fidei depositum is an Apostolic Constitution which states that the catechism of the Catholic Church is for the laity in its address to all the people of God.
Katechizm Płocki	2004	Stanisław Wielgus	Katechizm Płocki: Wyznanie wiary, Celebracja misterium chrześcijańskiego, Życie w Chrystusie, Modlitwa chrześcijańska.
Compendium of the Catechism of the Catholic Church	2005	USCCB	It originated with a request of Pope John Paul II in February 2003 and was issued by his successor Pope Benedict XVI 28 June 2005. The English version was printed at Libreria Editrice Vaticana in 2006. Unlike the larger catechism, the Compendium is similar in format to the Baltimore Catechism with 598 questions and answers, providing an easier format with only the "essential" contents of the Catechism of the Catholic Church as the title suggests.
United States Catholic Catechism for Adults	2006	USCCB	The 1992 Vatican catechism had several aims, among them to be an "authentic reference text for teaching Catholic doctrine and particularly for preparing local catechisms". American bishops responded with the 2006 United States Catholic Catechism for Adults (USCCB, 2006) – similar in format to a college textbook, targeting adults, contain seven elements that bring more depth to the material than the 'Compendium', providing more flexibility for diverse groups of people to study its contents. Each section or chapter contains the following: story or lesson of faith, foundation and application, sidebars, relationship to culture, discussion questions, doctrinal statements, and meditation and prayer. The lessons of faith stories are about individuals from the United States and allow the American reader to better relate to these individuals. This version of the catechism is available on audio CD-ROM as well.
Youcat	2011	Christoph Schönborn	Youcat, short for Youth Catechism of the Catholic Church, is a publication that aims to be an aid for youth to better understand the Catechism of the Catholic Church.
Christ – Our Pascha	2012	Synod of the Ukrainian Greek-Catholic Church	An Eastern Catholic catechism, created by the Ukrainian Greek Church & used by some of the other Eastern Catholic churches as well, as it provides a more Eastern perspective on the universal doctrines and practices of the Catholic Church, as well as delving into Eastern Christian practices and beliefs typically not emphasized in Western Catholicism. An English translation appeared in 2016.

=== Other historical catechisms ===
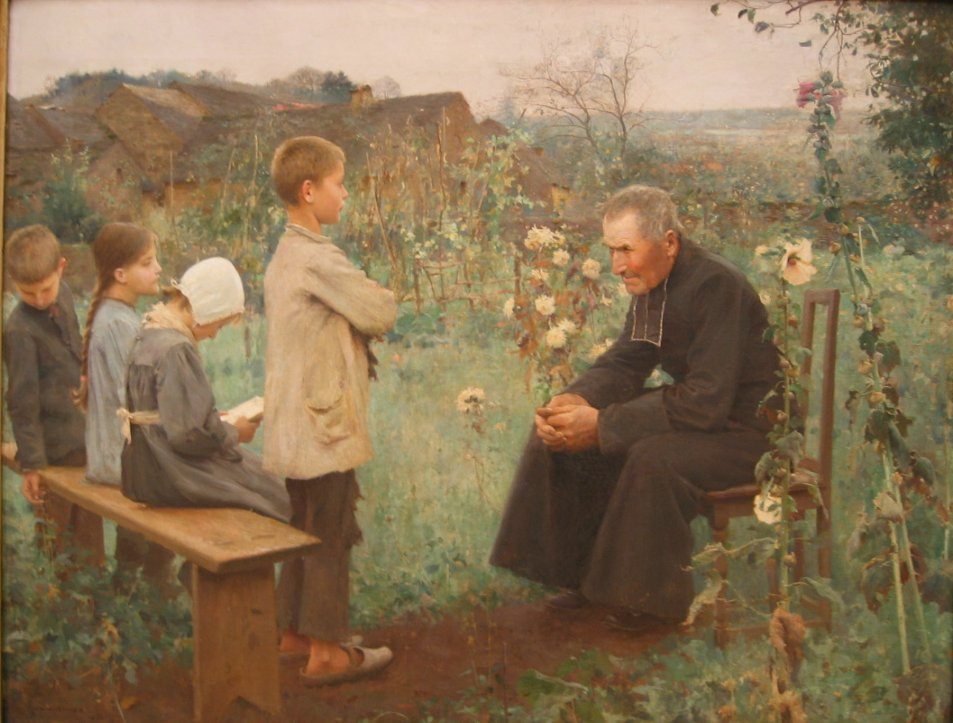
The Catechism Lesson by Jules-Alexis Muenier (1890), Museum of Fine Arts and Archeology of Besançon.

==== Disputatio Puerorum Per Interrogationes Et Responsiones ====
Catechism by Alcuin contains questions and answers. The question is asked by a student and the teacher answers him.

==== Weißenburger Katechismus ====
Written at the end of 8th century, intended for priests in Old High German. Created in Weissenburg Abbey in Alsace. The book contains: Lord's Prayer, form of confession, seven deadly sins, Apostles' Creed, Athanasian Creed and Gloria in excelsis Deo hymn. This catechism was created in the wake of canons prescribed by Admonitio generalis.

==== Elucidarium ====
Encyclopedic work about medieval Christian theology, originally written in the late 11th century by Honorius Augustodunensis. It was intended as a handbook for the lower and less educated clergy.

==== De quinque septenis seu septenariis ====
Work by Hugh of Saint Victor about seven deadly sins, seven petitions of the Lord's Prayer, seven gifts of the Holy Ghost, seven virtues, and Beatitudes.

==== Ignorantia sacerdotum ====
Ignorantia Sacerdotum are the first words and the better-known title of De Informatione Simplicium, a catechetical manual drafted by Archbishop Pecham's provincial Council of Lambeth in 1281. It called for the memorisation of the Apostles' Creed, the Ten Commandments, and the two-fold injunction to "love the Lord thy God with all thy heart... and thy neighbour as thyself.".

It also emphasised the Seven Virtues, the Seven Deadly Sins, the Seven Sacraments, and the Seven Works of Mercy.

A 1357 translation into English is often called the Lay-Folk's Catechism.

==== The Catechetical Instructions of St. Thomas Aquinas ====
The catechetical instructions of Saint Thomas Aquinas were used generally throughout the 13th and 14th centuries as manuals and textbooks for priests and teachers of religion. "The Explanations of St. Thomas," wrote Spirago, "are remarkable for their conciseness and their simplicity of language; they are especially noteworthy because the main parts of the catechetical course of instruction are brought into connection with one another so that they appear as one harmonious whole." The influence of these works is especially prominent in the "Roman Catechism" which the Council of Trent ordered written for parish priests and for all teachers of religion. Many of the explanatory passages in both works are almost identical.

==== Catechism of Christian Doctrine (or "Penny Catechism") ====
A question-and-answer format catechism that was the standard catechetical text in Great Britain in the earlier part of the 20th century. Popularly called the Penny Catechism, as the original version cost only one penny. Various editions of the Penny Catechism were issued through the century and changes were made to the text.

==== Catechism for Filipino Catholics ====
The Catechism for Filipino Catholics (CFC) is a contextualised and inculturated Filipino Catholic catechism prepared by the Catholic Bishops' Conference of the Philippines and approved by the Holy See. The draft was produced by the Conference's "Episcopal Commission on Catechesis and Catholic Education," and is an update of the late 16th century Doctrina Christiana en Lengua Espanola Y Tagala, which was a Hispano-Tagalog version of the earlier Hispano-Chinese Doctrina that was the First book of the Spanish Philippines|first book printed in the Philippines using moveable type.

The Doctrina Cristiana was written in Tagalog (both in a hispanised Latin script and the then-common indigenous Baybayin script), as well as Spanish. Amongst the contents of the Doctrina are the Spanish alphabet and phonics, basic prayers shown in both languages – in the case of the Tagalog, using archaic words and both scripts – and a brief catechism in question-and-answer format.

==== Enchiridion symbolorum, definitionum et declarationum de rebus fidei et morum ====
The Enchiridion symbolorum, definitionum et declarationum de rebus fidei et morum, also known as Enchiridion or Denzinger, is a compendium of all basic texts of Catholic dogma and morality since the apostles. Commissioned by Pope Pius IX, it has been in use since 1854, and has been updated periodically. It is a compendium of faith, like a catechism. By including all relevant teachings throughout history, it is at the same time, more than a catechism. It is a search instrument for theologians, historians and anybody interested in Christian religion. The latest updates of the Enchiridion extend to the teachings of Pope John Paul II.

The Archbishop of Baltimore Cardinal James Gibbons is quoted in earlier versions of the Enchiridion, that every theologian should have always two books at hand, the Holy Bible and this Enchiridion.

=== Tradivox catechism series ===
The Tradivox Catholic Catechism Index is a twenty-volume book series developed by Tradivox and published by Sophia Institute Press, consisting of reprints of more than thirty historical Catholic catechisms. It consists of twenty cross-indexed hardcover volumes, with an index volume. The project received several endorsements from prominent members of the Catholic clergy & public, including Cardinal Burke, Cardinal Müller, Cardinal Pell, Bishop Strickland, Bishop Schneider, and theologian Peter Kwasniewski. As the episcopal advisor of the project, Bishop Schneider has written a foreword for each of the hardcover volumes in the series.

==== Contents ====
Volume	Content	Publication Date	ISBN
1	An Honest Godlye Instruction (1556) by Edmund Bonner; A Catechisme of Christian Doctrine (1567) by Laurence Vaux; The Christian Doctrine (1573) by Fr. Diego de Ledesma	September 2020	ISBN 978-1-64413-350-7
2	A Shorte Catechisme (1614) by Robert Bellarmine; An Abridgment of the Christian Doctrine [or Douay Catechism] (1649) by Henry Tuberville; The Childes Catechism (1678) by Vincent Sadler	December 2020	ISBN 978-1-64413-352-1
3	Catechisms of Bishop Richard Challoner (18th century) by Richard Challoner	April 2021	ISBN 978-1-64413-354-5
4	The Most Rev. Dr. James Butler's Catechism (1775) by James Butler; The Catechism Ordered by the National Synod of Maynooth (1884); The Short Catechism Extracted (1891)	July 2021	ISBN 978-1-64413-356-9
5	The Catechism, or Christian Doctrine, By Way of Question and Answer (1742) by Donlevy; A Catechism Moral and Controversial (1752) by Fr. Burke	October 2021	ISBN 978-1-64413-358-3
6	The Catechetical Instructions (ca. 1260) by Thomas Aquinas; Ignorantia Sacerdotum (1281) by the Provincial Council of Lambeth; Quinque Verba (1300); Oculus Sacerdotis (ca. 1320) by William of Pagula	January 2022	ISBN 978-1-64413-360-6
7	The Catechism of the Council of Trent (1566)	April 2022	ISBN 978-1-64413-362-0
8	A Dogmatic Catechism (1842) by Joseph Frassinetti; Compendium of Christian Doctrine (1908) by Pope Pius X	July 2022	ISBN 978-1-64413-364-4
9	Summa Doctrina Christianae or Large Catechism (1555) by Peter Canisius; Catechismus Minor or Small Catechism (1558) by Peter Canisius	October 2022	ISBN 978-1-64413-366-8
10	The Catechism of Perseverance [Part 1] (1854) by Jean-Joseph Gaume	January 2023	ISBN 978-1-64413-368-2
11	The Catechism of Perseverance [Part 2] (1854) by Jean-Joseph Gaume	April 2023	ISBN 978-1-64413-370-5
12	The Catechism of Perseverance [Part 3] (1854) by Jean-Joseph Gaume	July 2023	ISBN 978-1-64413-372-9
13	The Catechism of Perseverance [Part 4] (1854) by Jean-Joseph Gaume	October 2023	ISBN 978-1-64413-374-3
14	Small Catechism (19th century) by Joseph Deharbe; A Complete Catechism of the Catholic Religion (1847) by Joseph Deharbe	January 2024	ISBN 978-1-64413-376-7
15	Quebec Catechism (17th century)	April 2024	ISBN 978-1644133781
16	Baltimore Catechism (19th century)	July 2024	ISBN 978-1644133804
17	The Convert's Catechism of Catholic Doctrine (1910) by Peter Geiermann; Catechism for First Communicants (1911); The Catechism Simply Explained (1897) by Henry Cafferata	October 2024	ISBN 978-1644133828
18	The Catholic Catechism (20th century) by Pietro Gasparri	January 2025	ISBN 978-1644133842
19	Katholischer Katechismus der Bistümer Deutschlands (1955) by the German Bishops' Conference	April 2025	ISBN 978-1644133866
20	Catholic Catechism Index	June 2025	ISBN 978-1644133880

== Orthodox catechisms ==
Most Orthodox would refer back to the original writings of the Church Fathers, including the Catechetical Lectures of St. Cyril of Jerusalem and The Ladder of Divine Ascent. New catechumens would generally be encouraged to read "The Orthodox Church" by Kallistos Ware to get an overview of the Christian faith from an Orthodox perspective before being given more advanced readings.

In recent times, perhaps under influence from the West, a number of catechisms have emerged in the Eastern Orthodox Church such as the Catechism by Philaret Drozdov, which is entitled, "The Longer Catechism of The Orthodox, Catholic, Eastern Church," "A new-style catechism on the Eastern Orthodox faith for adults" by Rev. George Mastrantonis, and the more modern "The Orthodox Faith" by Protopresbyter Thomas Hopko. However, presently such catechisms are not widely used.

The Oriental Orthodox Churches rely heavily on the Didascalia Apostolorum. The Ethiopic version is known as the "Ethiopic Didascalia." It is included in the Orthodox Tewahedo biblical canon, and is read from on Sundays. The faith of the Coptic Orthodox Church has historically been evidenced in the lives and sayings of the early desert monks, which was recorded in "The paradise of the holy fathers," Volume 1 and Volume 2. Recently the Coptic church has used Fr. Tadros Malaty's books, along with Pope Shenouda III of Alexandria's many books, to help lay people better understand their Coptic faith. However, like the Eastern Orthodox church, the faith is mostly expounded in the lives of the saints and the material recited during the services.

== Protestant catechisms ==
The catechism's question-and-answer format, with a view toward the instruction of children, was a form adopted by the various Protestant confessions almost from the beginning of the Reformation.

Among the first projects of the Reformation was the production of catechisms self-consciously modelled after the older traditions of Cyril of Jerusalem and Augustine. These catechisms showed special admiration for Chrysostom's view of the family as a "little church", and placed strong responsibility on every father to teach his children, to prevent them from coming to baptism or the Lord's table ignorant of the doctrine under which they are expected to live as Christians.

=== Anglican catechisms ===
The Anglican Book of Common Prayer includes a catechism. In older editions it is a brief manual for the instruction of those preparing to be brought before the bishop for confirmation: the baptised first professes his baptism, and then rehearses the principal elements of the faith into which he has been baptised: the Apostles' Creed, Ten Commandments, the Lord's Prayer, and the sacraments.

Catechist: What is your Name?

Answer: N. or M.

Catechist: Who gave you this Name?
Answer: My Godfathers and Godmothers in my Baptism; wherein I was made a member of Christ, the child of God, and an inheritor of the kingdom of heaven.

The "N. or M." stands for the Latin, "nomen vel nomina", meaning "name or names". It is an accident of typography that "nomina" (nn.) came to be represented by "m".

The catechism was published in 1604 as a stand-alone document. It was later bound up with the 1662 Book of Common Prayer. This edition holds authority across the Anglican Communion.

==== United Kingdom ====
Author	Title	Publication
William Nicholson	"An exposition of the catechism of the Church of England"	1655
Zacheus Isham	"The Catechism of the Church: with Proofs from the New Testament: and Some Additional Questions and Answers"	1694
Samuel Clarke	"An exposition of the church-catechism"	1719
Thomas Secker	"Lectures on the Catechism of the Church of England"	1769 (vol. I and vol. II)
Thomas Howell	"A familiar and practical improvement of the church catechism"	1775
Thomas Howell	"Discourses on the commandments"	1824
Stephen Wilkinson Dowell	"A catechism on the services of the Church of England"	1852
Vernon Staley	"The Catholic religion : a manual of instruction for members of the Anglican Church"	1908
	"The Catechism An Outline of the Faith'	1998 by Church in Wales.

==== United States ====
The Episcopal Church's 1928 prayer book included a catechism with offices of instruction, based upon the catechism of the Church of England's 1662 prayer book.

The Episcopal Church's 1979 prayer book includes a catechism newly written for the prayer book, intended as "an outline of instruction" and "a brief summary of the Church's teaching".

"To Be A Christian: An Anglican Catechism" was published in 2020 by Anglican House Media Ministries, the publishing house of the Anglican Church in North America (ACNA).

=== Baptist catechisms ===
Keach's Catechism is utilized in many Particular Baptist congregations. Nondenominational Reformed Baptist preacher John Piper wrote a commentary on this catechism, publishing it in 1986.

=== Lutheran catechisms ===
Luther's Large Catechism (1529) typifies the emphasis which the churches of the Augsburg Confession placed on the importance of knowledge and understanding of the articles of the Christian faith. Primarily intended as instruction to teachers, especially to parents, the catechism consists of a series of exhortations on the importance of each topic of the catechism. It is meant for those who have the capacity to understand, and is meant to be memorized and then repeatedly reviewed so that the Small Catechism could be taught with understanding. For example, the author stipulates in the preface:

Therefore it is the duty of every father of a family to question and examine his children and servants at least once a week and to ascertain what they know of it, or are learning and, if they do not know it, to keep them faithfully at it. The catechism, Luther wrote, should consist of instruction in the rule of conduct, which always accuses us because we fail to keep it (Ten Commandments), the rule of faith (Apostles' Creed), the rule of prayer (Lord's Prayer), and the sacraments (baptism, confession, and communion).

Luther adds:

However, it is not enough for them to comprehend and recite these parts according to the words only, but the young people should also be made to attend the preaching, especially during the time which is devoted to the catechism, that they may hear it explained and may learn to understand what every part contains, so as to be able to recite it as they have heard it, and, when asked, may give a correct answer, so that the preaching may not be without profit and fruit.

Luther's Small Catechism, in contrast, is written to accommodate the understanding of a child or an uneducated person. It begins:

The First Commandment

You shall have no other gods.

Q. What does this mean?

A. We should fear, love, and trust in God above all things.

=== Methodist catechisms ===
The Probationer's Catechism was authored by Methodist divine S. Olin Garrison for probationary members of the Methodist Episcopal Church seeking full membership in the connexion; it has been one of the most widely used catechisms in Methodist history. A Catechism on the Christian Religion: The Doctrines of Christianity with Special Emphasis on Wesleyan Concepts by Mel-Thomas and Helen Rothwell is another popular catechism used to explicate Wesleyan-Arminian theology. More recent publications are A Catechism Prepared Especially for the Members of the Evangelical Wesleyan Church (printed in the United States), A Larger Catechism: For Members of the Christian Methodist Episcopal Church (printed in the United States), and A Catechism for the Use of the People Called Methodists (printed in Great Britain).

=== Pentecostal catechisms ===
While the Pentecostal movement has no one official catechism or confession, nevertheless Pentecostal authors have produced catechetical works. William Seymour, founder of the Azusa Street revival, included a catechism in the Doctrines and Disciplines of the Azusa Street Apostolic Faith Mission. Assemblies of God minister Warren D. Combs produced a catechism in the 1960s. In 2016 Henry Volk the host of the Theology in Perspective podcast authored a resource entitled, A Pentecostal Catechism.

=== Quaker catechisms ===
A prominent catechism of the Religious Society of Friends is A Catechism and Confession of Faith (1673), published by Robert Barclay.

=== Reformed catechisms ===
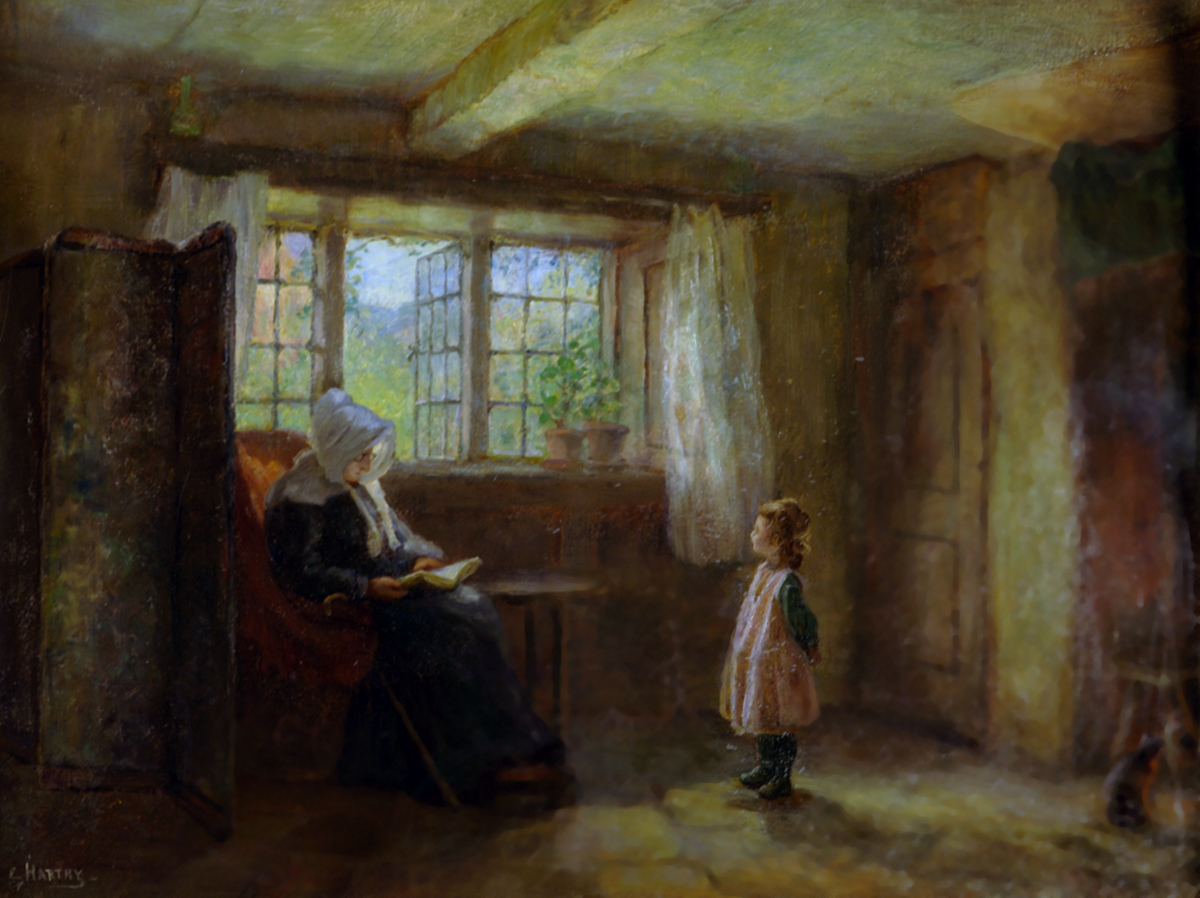
The Catechism, painting by Edith Hartry

Calvin's 1545 preface to the Genevan Catechism begins with an acknowledgement that the several traditions and cultures which were joined in the Reformed movement would produce their own form of instruction in each place. While Calvin argues that no effort should be expended on preventing this, he adds:

We are all directed to one Christ, in whose truth being united together, we may grow up into one body and one spirit, and with the same mouth also proclaim whatever belongs to the sum of faith. Catechists not intent on this end, besides fatally injuring the Church, by sowing the materials of dissension in religion, also introduce an impious profanation of baptism. For where can any longer be the utility of baptism unless this remain as its foundation – that we all agree in one faith? Wherefore, those who publish Catechisms ought to be the more carefully on their guard, by producing anything rashly, they may not for the present only, but in regard to posterity also, do grievous harm to piety, and inflict a deadly wound on the Church.

The scandal of diverse instruction is that it produces diverse baptisms and diverse communions, and diverse faith. However, forms may vary without introducing substantial differences, according to the Reformed view of doctrine.

==== Genevan Catechism ====
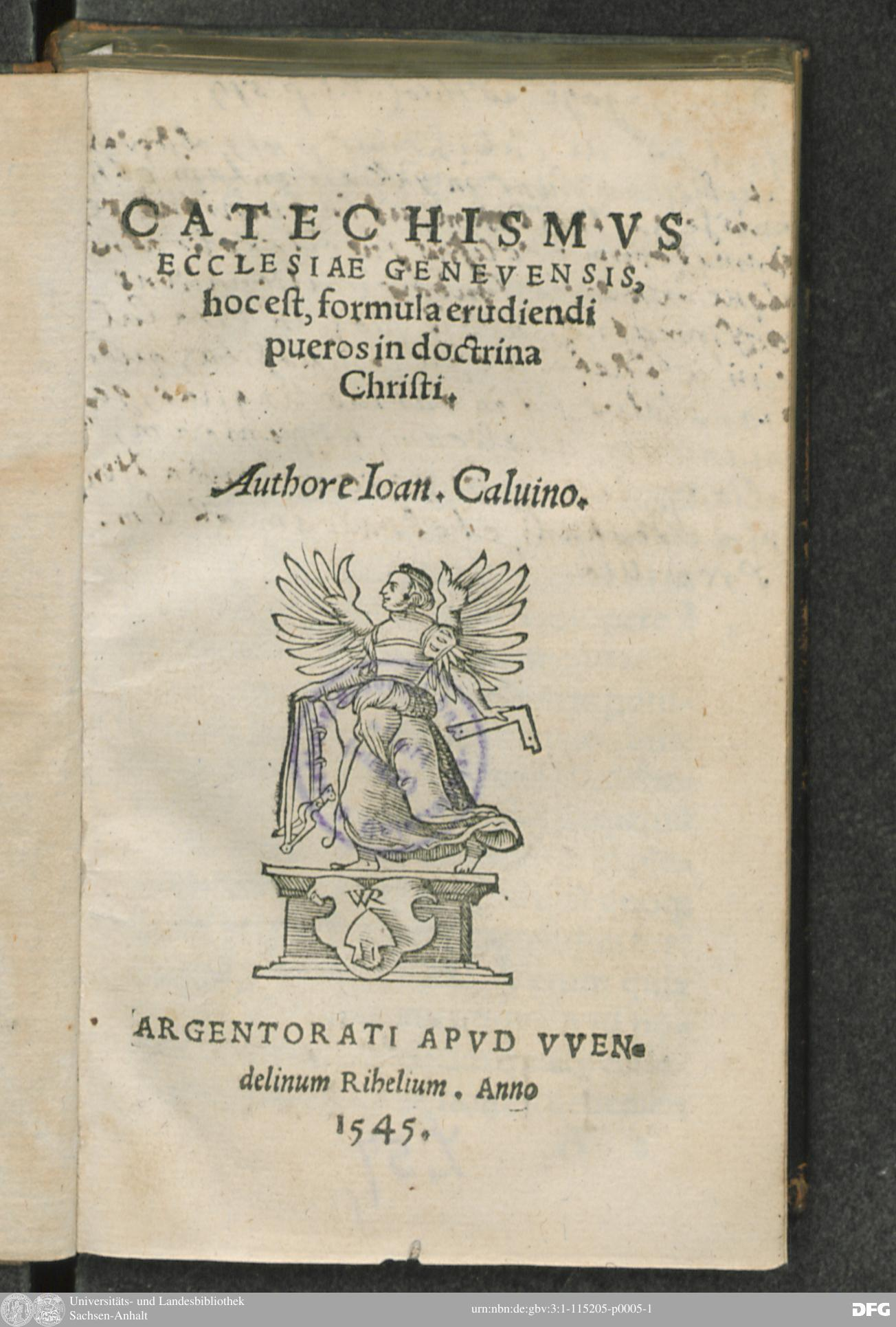
Title page of 1545 edition of the Genevan Catechism

John Calvin produced a catechism while at Geneva (1541), which underwent two major revisions (1545 and 1560). Calvin's aim in writing the catechism of 1545 was to set a basic pattern of doctrine, meant to be imitated by other catechists, which would not affirm local distinctions or dwell on controversial issues, but would serve as a pattern for what was expected to be taught by Christian fathers and other teachers of children in the church. The catechism is organized on the topics of faith, law, prayer and sacraments.

1. Master. What is the chief end of human life?
  Scholar. To know God by whom men were created.
2. M. What reason have you for saying so?
  S. Because he created us and placed us in this world to be glorified in us. And it is indeed right that our life, of which himself is the beginning, should be devoted to his glory.
3. M. What is the highest good of man?
  S. The very same thing.

==== Heidelberg Catechism ====
After Protestantism entered into the Palatinate, in 1546 the controversy between Lutherans and Calvinists broke out, and especially while the region was under the elector Otto Heinrich (1556–1559), this conflict in Saxony, particularly in Heidelberg, became increasingly bitter and turned violent.

When Frederick III, Elector Palatine, came into power in 1559 he put his authority behind the Calvinistic view on the Lord's Supper, which denied the local presence of the body of Jesus Christ in the elements of the sacrament. He turned Sapienz College into a school of divinity, and in 1562 he placed over it a pupil and friend of Luther's colleague, Philipp Melanchthon, named Zacharias Ursinus. In an attempt to resolve the religious disputes in his domain, Frederick called upon Ursinus and his colleague Caspar Olevianus (preacher to Frederick's court) to produce a catechism. As Hyde writes,

"It was intended to do three things: 1) provide a 'fixed form and model' of Christian doctrine for his realm; 2) instruct the youth of the Palatinate in school and church; and 3) enable the pastors and schoolteachers of the Palatinate to preach/teach.

The two collaborators referred to existing catechetical literature, and especially relied on the catechisms of Calvin and of John Lasco. To prepare the catechism, they adopted the method of sketching drafts independently, and then bringing together the work to combine their efforts. "The final preparation was the work of both theologians, with the constant co-operation of Frederick III. Ursinus has always been regarded as the principal author, as he was afterwards the chief defender and interpreter of the Catechism; still, it would appear that the nervous German style, the division into three parts (as distinguished from the five parts in the Catechism of Calvin and the previous draft of Ursinus), and the genial warmth and unction of the whole work, are chiefly due to Olevianus." (Schaff, in. Am. Presb. Rev. July 1863, p. 379). The structure of the Heidelberg Catechism is spelled out in the second question; and the three-part structure seen there is based on the belief that the single work of salvation brings forward the three persons of the Trinity in turn, to make God fully and intimately known by his work of salvation, referring to the Apostles' Creed as an epitome of Christian faith. Assurance of salvation is the unifying theme throughout this catechism: assurance obtained by the work of Christ, applied through the sacraments, and resulting in grateful obedience to the commandments and persistence in prayer.

Lord's Day 1.

Q. What is thy only comfort in life and death?
A. That I with body and soul, both in life and death, am not my own, but belong unto my faithful Saviour Jesus Christ; who, with his precious blood, has fully satisfied for all my sins, and delivered me from all the power of the devil; and so preserves me that without the will of my heavenly Father, not a hair can fall from my head; yea, that all things must be subservient to my salvation, and therefore, by his Holy Spirit, He also assures me of eternal life, and makes me sincerely willing and ready, henceforth, to live unto him.

Q. How many things are necessary for thee to know, that thou, enjoying this comfort, mayest live and die happily?

A. Three; the first, how great my sins and miseries are; the second, how I may be delivered from all my sins and miseries; the third, how I shall express my gratitude to God for such deliverance.

The Heidelberg Catechism is the most widely used of the Catechisms of the Reformed churches.

==== Westminster Catechisms ====
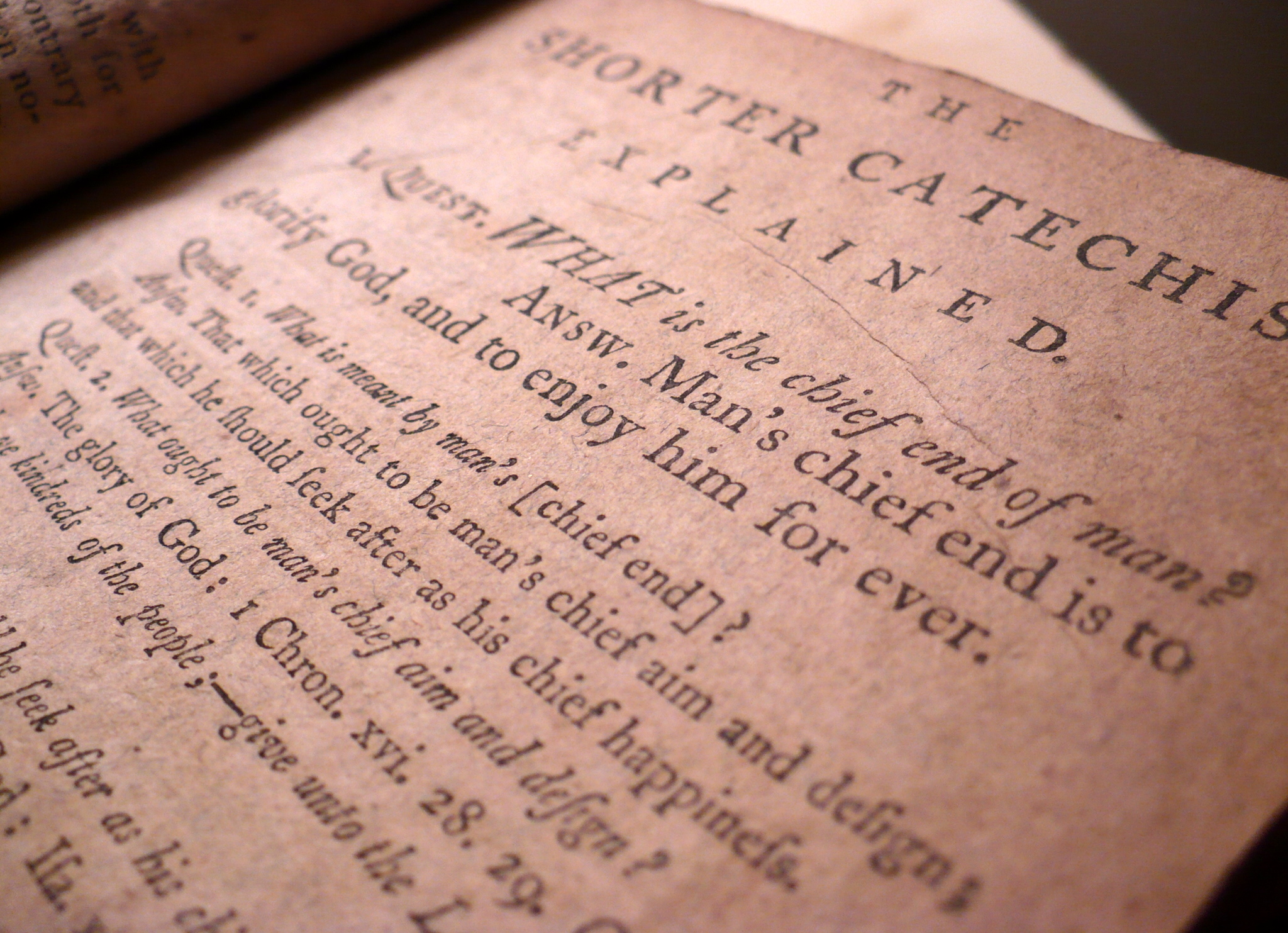
The first page of the ninth edition of The Shorter Catechism Explained (Perth, 1785).

Together with the Westminster Confession of Faith (1647), the Westminster Assembly also produced two catechisms, a Larger and a Shorter, which were intended for use in Christian families and in churches. These documents have served as the doctrinal standards, subordinate to the Bible, for Presbyterians and other Reformed churches around the world. The Shorter Catechism shows the Assembly's reliance upon the previous work of Calvin, Lasco, and the theologians of Heidelberg. It comprises two main sections summarizing what the Scriptures principally teach: the doctrine of God, and the duty required of men. Questions and answers cover the usual elements: faith, the Ten Commandments, the sacraments, and prayer.

Q. What is the chief end of man?

A. Man's chief end is to glorify God, and to enjoy him forever.

Q. What rule hath God given to direct us how we may glorify and enjoy him?
A. The Word of God, which is contained in the Scriptures of the Old and New Testaments, is the only rule to direct us how we may glorify and enjoy him.

Q. What do the scriptures principally teach?

A. The scriptures principally teach, what man is to believe concerning God, and what duty God requires of man.

==== Other Reformed catechisms ====
Oecolampadius composed the Basel Catechism in 1526, Leo Juda (1534) followed by Bullinger (1555) published catechisms in Zurich. The French Reformed used Calvin's Genevan catechism, as well as works published by Louis Cappel (1619), and Charles Drelincourt (1642).

Spiritual Milk for Boston Babes, written by the Puritan minister John Cotton and published in 1656, was the first known children's book published in the United States.

== Non-Christian catechisms ==
According to Norman DeWitt, the early Christians appropriated the practice of compiling catechisms from the Epicureans, a school whose founder Epicurus had instructed to keep summaries of the teachings for easy learning.

=== Abrahamic religions ===
Judaism does not have a formal catechism. While there have been several attempts to formulate Jewish principles of faith, and some of these have achieved wide acceptance, none can be described as being in the form of a catechism. The most widely recited formulation, Yigdal, is in the form of a hymn based on Maimonides' 13 Articles of Faith.

Besides the manuals of instruction that were published by the Christians for use in their families and churches, there were other works produced by heretical sectarian groups intended as a compact refutation of Christian orthodoxy.

For example, Socinians in Poland published the Racovian Catechism in 1605, using the question and answer format of a catechism for the orderly presentation of their arguments against the Trinity and the doctrine of Hell, as these were understood by the Reformed churches from which they were forced to separate.

Islam teaches children and new Muslims the matters of faith, worship, and ethics in the form of a concise manual. They are popular in Turkish as Ilmihal (from the Arabic Ilm ul-Hal, Situation Science). It is also advised for every Muslim to have a basic knowledge of such matters of religion. The first chapter is the book of cleanliness and first to be taught are subjects such as: which are clean, what is clean and what is not clean, what people need to be cleansed from, how they should clean, and which water should they use to clean. There is a well-known book of catechism that is studied in Islamic boarding schools in Indonesia called Safinatun Najah, which talks about of matters of faith, worship and jurisprudence.

=== Indian religions ===
Bhaktivinoda Thakur's book Jaiva Dharma is an example of Gaudiya Vaishnava catechism. It follows the usual question-answer format.

In the Pali Canon of Theravada Buddhism a small bit of catechism appears as the fourth section of the Khuddakapatha, as well as the forty-third and forty-fourth suttas of the Majjhima Nikaya. Henry Steel Olcott introduced his own form of Buddhist Catechism, appropriated from Christianity, to Ceylon when setting up his Buddhist education system during the late 19th century Buddhist revival on the island.

=== Other religious traditions ===
In Zoroastrianism there is the "ČĪDAG ANDARZ Ī PŌRYŌTKĒŠĀN" also known as "Pand-nāmag ī Zardušt" (Book of the counsels of Zoroaster), which is a post-Sasanian compendium of apothegms intended to instruct every Zoroastrian male, upon his attaining the age of fifteen years, in fundamental religious and ethical principles, as well as in the daily duties incumbent upon him. In Robert Charles Zaehner's words, it "sums up succinctly the whole of Zoroastrian doctrine: it is what every boy and girl of fifteen must know before he or she is invested with the sacred girdle {kusti}."

Epicurean catechesis may have originated from the practice of writing outlines of Epicurean doctrines for easy memorization. Epicurus' Letter to Herodotus is known as the "Little Epitome" which young students are instructed to memorize, and in antiquity they would move on to more advanced teachings with the "Large Epitome". The 40 Principal Doctrines also serve the role of a catechism. The philosopher Philodemus of Gadara instructed his students to keep an outline of the doctrines on wealth and economics, so that there are additional doctrines that advanced students may focus on.

Schools of esoteric learning have used a catechetical style of instruction, as this Zodiac catechism shows:

Q. "Where is the animal, O Lanoo? and where the Man?

A. Fused into one, O Master of my Life. The two are one. But both have disappeared and naught remains but the deep fire of my desire.

== Secular catechisms ==
By the late 18th century, "catechism" was adopted for secular uses, especially in political contexts. These "political catechisms" often utilized the question-and-answer format to succinctly present political ideologies.

The term has also been used by atheist and non-Christian philosophers, such as:

- Saint-Simon (Catechism of Industrialists)
- Auguste Comte (Positivist Catechism)

Catechisms were also written to rehearse the basic knowledge of a non-religious subject. Examples include numerous political catechisms published from the 18th to the 20th century in Europe as well as in North and South America. See also the Catechism of the History of Newfoundland (c1856), the Coal Catechism (1898), and A Catechism of the Steam Engine (1856). "Elementary catechism on the Constitution of the United States" Arthur J. Stansbury (1828), "Catechism of the Constitution of the United States" Lewis Cruger (1863) and "A Catechism of the Constitution of the United States of America" John V. Overall. Friedrich Engels' 1847 work Principles of Communism was written as a catechism: Engels subsequently decided that the format was not suited to the addition of historical material which he felt was necessary, and he and Karl Marx restructured the material and used it as the nucleus of The Communist Manifesto. Samuel Parkes, a British industrial chemist, wrote A Chemical Catechism (first edition 1806) as an introductory, popular text for general public.

Science and technology communities often relate to the Heillmeier Catechism coined by former DARPA Director George Heillmeier. These 8 questions (4 big and 4 small) must be answered by a Program Manager in order to launch a program.

Some literary works have also taken the form of a catechism. The 17th episode of James Joyce's novel Ulysses, known as "Ithaca", is written in the form of a catechism, as is Ted Hughes' poem Examination at the Womb Door, from the collection Crow. In Henry IV, Part 1: Act V, Scene I, Line 141 Falstaff refers to his monologue as a catechism, explaining his view of the virtue of honor.

== See also ==
- Catechesis
