= Catechism of Saint Pius X =

1905 Catholic catechism

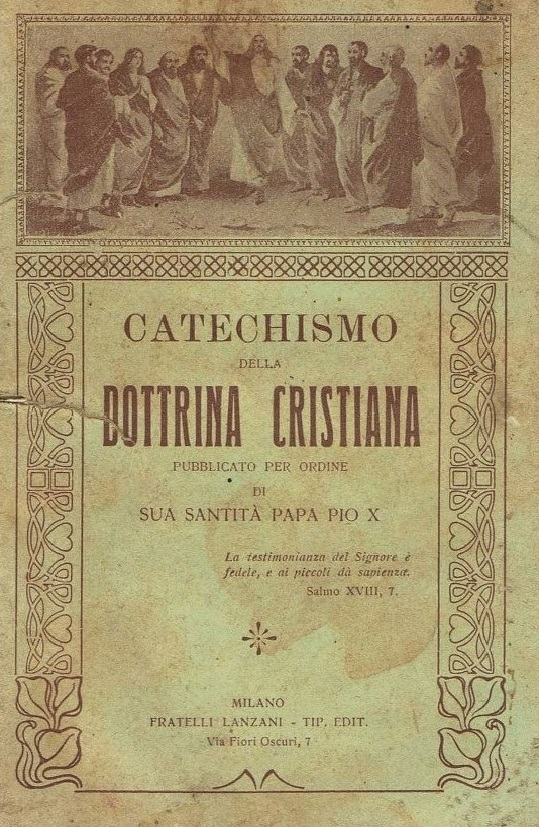
Catechismo della Dottrina Cristiana.

The Catechism of Saint Pius X is a name commonly used for a 1910 English translation of the catechismo maggiore, a portion of the Compendio della dottrina cristiana which Pope Pius X prescribed to be used for catechesis in the Diocese and Province of Rome in 1905. In 1912, Pius prescribed a new catechism for the same use, the Catechismo della dottrina cristiana, which he described as much shorter and better adapted to present-day needs.

== Development and use ==
=== Second Vatican Council ===
Following the Second Council of the Vatican, the Catechism of Saint Pius X fell into disuse. The Dutch Catechism of 1966, authored by theologians Edward Schillebeeckx OP and Piet Schoonenberg SJ was proposed as a successor to it, but was met by strong opposition by conservative sectors of the Church due to its extreme progressivism.

The SSPX recommends the Catechism of Saint Pius X over the Catechism of the Catholic Church.

=== Pope Benedict XVI ===
Joseph Ratzinger, when discussing the forthcoming Compendium of the Catechism of the Catholic Church, referred to the catechism of Saint Pius X:

The faith, as such, is always the same. Therefore, St. Pius X's catechism always retains its value. […] There can be persons or groups that feel more comfortable with St. Pius X's catechism. [...] [T]hat Catechism stemmed from a text that was prepared by the Pope himself [Pius X] when he was Bishop of Mantua. The text was the fruit of the personal catechetical experience of Giuseppe Sarto [Pius X], whose characteristics were simplicity of exposition and depth of content. Also because of this, St. Pius X's catechism might have friends in the future

In the general audience of 18 August 2010 Pope Benedict XVI affirmed:

Beginning in his years as parish priest, he himself had compiled a catechism and during his Episcopate in Mantua he worked to produce a single, if not universal catechism, at least in Italian. As an authentic Pastor he had understood that the situation in that period, due partly to the phenomenon of emigration, made necessary a catechism to which every member of the faithful might refer, independently of the place in which he lived and of his position. As Pontiff, he compiled a text of Christian doctrine for the Diocese of Rome that was later disseminated throughout Italy and the world. Because of its simple, clear, precise language and effective explanations, this "Pius X Catechism", as it was called, was a reliable guide to many in learning the truths of the faith.

— General audience of the 18th August 2010
