= Catechism of the Catholic Church =

Summary of doctrine of the Catholic Church

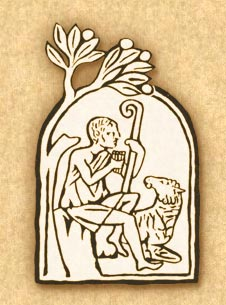
The Good Shepherd logo on the cover of many editions is adapted from a Christian tombstone in the catacombs of Domitilla in Rome.

The Catechism of the Catholic Church (Latin: Catechismus Catholicae Ecclesiae; commonly called the Catechism or the CCC) is a reference work that summarizes the Catholic Church's doctrine. It was promulgated by Pope John Paul II in 1992 as a reference for the development of local catechisms, directed primarily to those (in the church) responsible for catechesis and offered as "useful reading for all other Christian faithful". It has been translated into and published in more than twenty languages worldwide.

John Paul II referred to it as "the Catechism of the Second Vatican Council", and Pope Benedict XVI described it as "one of the most important fruits of the Second Vatican Council".

== Drafting ==
The decision to publish an official catechism was taken at the Second Extraordinary General Assembly of the Synod of Bishops, which was convened by Pope John Paul II on 25 January 1985 to evaluate the progress of implementing the Vatican II council's goals on the 20th anniversary of its closure. The assembly participants expressed the desire that "a catechism or compendium of all Catholic doctrine regarding both faith and morals be composed, that it might be, as it were, a point of reference for the catechisms or compendiums that are prepared in various regions. The presentation of doctrine must be biblical and liturgical. It must be sound doctrine suited to the present life of Christians."

John Paul II says that in 1986 he formed a commission composed of 12 cardinals and bishops chaired by cardinal Joseph Ratzinger (who later became Pope Benedict XVI) to prepare the first draft of the Catechism. The commission was assisted by a committee consisting of seven diocesan bishops, experts in theology and catechesis.

The first principal part of the Catechism, which deals with the Profession of Faith, was drafted by Bishop José Manuel Estepa Llaurens and Bishop Alessandro Maggiolini. The second principal part, on the sacraments, was drafted by future Cardinals Jorge Medina and Estanislao Esteban Karlic. The third principal part, on life in Christ, was drafted by the future Cardinal Jean Honoré and Bishop David Konstant. The final principal part, on prayer, was drafted by Fr. Jean Corbon, a Lebanese Melkite priest. Future CDF Prefect William Levada wrote the Catechism's glossary. The project's editorial secretary was the future Cardinal Christoph Schönborn, OP.

Reminiscing those days, Benedict said in 2011: "I must confess that even today it seems a miracle to me that this project [the Catechism of the Catholic Church] was ultimately successful".

Cardinal Georges Cottier said he had worked on the catechism.

== Promulgation ==
The Catechism of the Catholic Church, which I approved 25 June last and the publication of which I today order by virtue of my Apostolic Authority, is a statement of the Church's faith and of Catholic doctrine, attested to or illumined by Sacred Scripture, Apostolic Tradition and the Church's Magisterium. I declare it to be a valid and legitimate instrument for ecclesial communion and a sure norm for teaching the faith.

— John Paul II, Fidei depositum, part IV

The Catechism was promulgated by John Paul II on 11 October 1992, the 30th anniversary of the opening of the Second Vatican Council, with his apostolic constitution Fidei depositum (in English, The Deposit of Faith).

On 15 August 1997, the Solemnity of the Assumption of the Blessed Virgin Mary, John Paul II promulgated the Latin typical edition, with his apostolic letter Laetamur magnopere.

== Publication ==
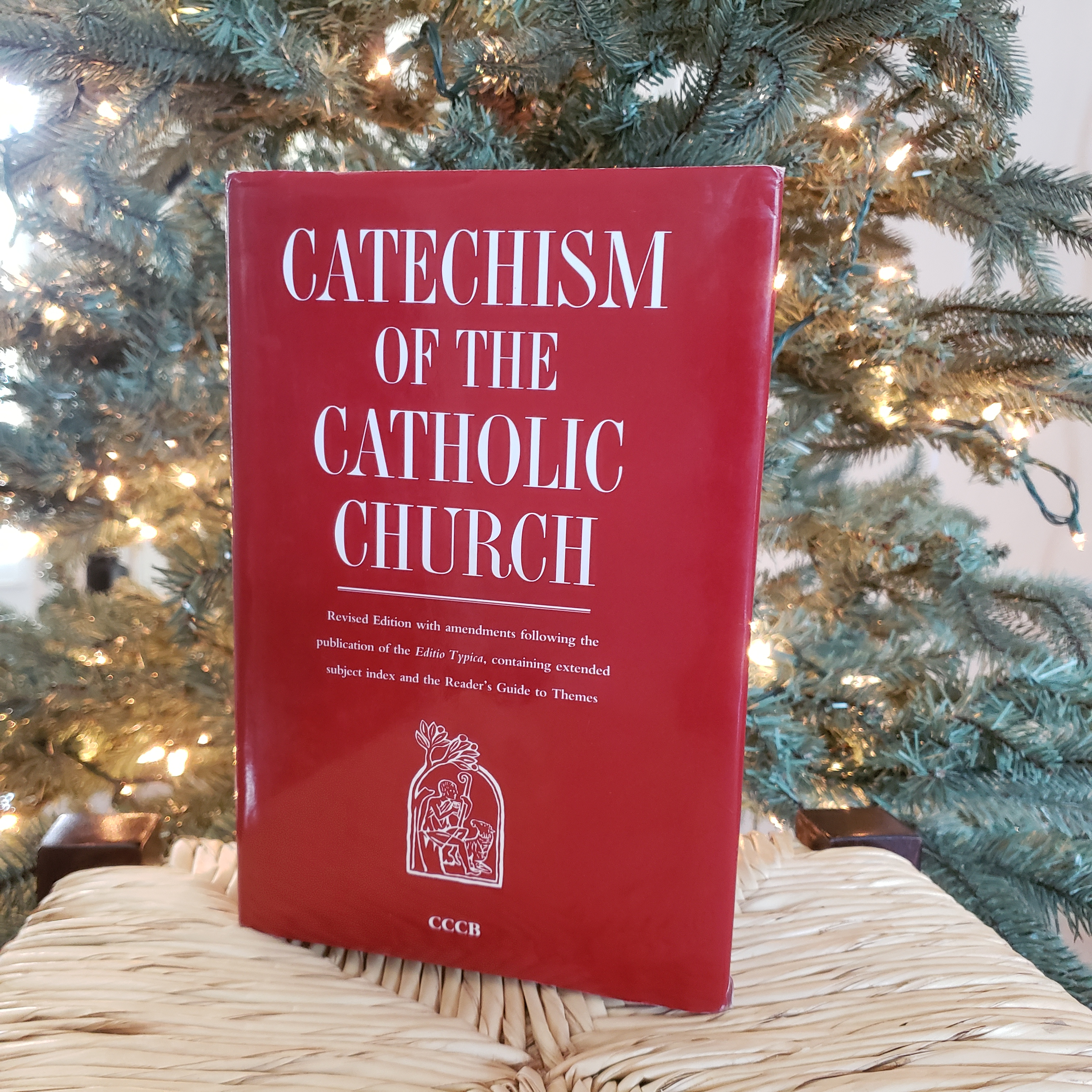
Catechism of the Catholic Church (CCCB / Canadian edition) in front of a tree

The CCC was published in the French language in 1992. In the United States, the English translation was published in 1994 and more than 250,000 copies had been pre-ordered before its release, with a note that it was "subject to revision according to the Latin typical edition (editio typica) when it is published".

The Latin typical edition, the official text of reference promulgated on 15 August 1997, amended the contents of the provisional French text at a few points. As a result, the earlier translations from the French into other languages (including English) had to be amended and re-published as "second editions". (Note: In the U.S., the bishops then published a new English translation, from the official Latin text. (English translation of the Catechism of the Catholic Church: Modifications from the Editio Typica, copyright 1997, United States Catholic Conference, Inc.—Libreria Editrice Vaticana.) The U.S. bishops added a "Glossary and Index Analyticus" (copyright 2000, United States Catholic Conference, Inc.) and published the new translation, with glossary and index, as the Catechism of the Catholic Church, Second Edition, "revised in accordance with the official Latin text promulgated by John Paul II". (From the title page.) It was noted that "a glossary had been proposed" previously, before initial promulgation, "to provide assistance to those who would use the new Catechism".)

Over eight million copies have been sold worldwide and the book has been published in more than twenty languages.

== Doctrinal value ==
In the apostolic constitution Fidei depositum, John Paul II declared that the Catechism of the Catholic Church is "a valid and legitimate instrument for ecclesial communion and a sure norm for teaching the faith", and stressed that it "is not intended to replace the local catechisms duly approved by the ecclesiastical authorities, the diocesan Bishops and the Episcopal Conferences".

The Catechism states:

11 This catechism aims at presenting an organic synthesis of the essential and fundamental contents of Catholic doctrine, as regards both faith and morals, in the light of the Second Vatican Council and the whole of the Church's Tradition. Its principal sources are the Sacred Scriptures, the Fathers of the Church, the liturgy, and the Church's Magisterium. It is intended to serve "as a point of reference for the catechisms or compendia that are composed in the various countries".

12 This work is intended primarily for those responsible for catechesis: first of all the bishops, as teachers of the faith and pastors of the Church. It is offered to them as an instrument in fulfilling their responsibility of teaching the People of God. Through the bishops, it is addressed to redactors of catechisms, to priests, and to catechists. It will also be useful reading for all other Christian faithful.

== Contents ==
=== Overview ===
The Catechism is a source on which to base other Catholic catechisms (e.g., YOUCAT or the Youth Catechism of the Catholic Church) and other expositions of Catholic doctrine. As stated in the apostolic constitution Fidei depositum, with which its publication was ordered, it was given so "that it may be a sure and authentic reference text for teaching Catholic doctrine and particularly for preparing local catechisms".

The Catechism includes 2865 paragraphs, arranged in four principal parts:

- The Profession of Faith (the Apostles' Creed)
- The Celebration of the Christian Mystery (the Sacred Liturgy, and especially the sacraments)
- Life in Christ (including the Ten Commandments)
- Christian Prayer (including the Lord's Prayer).

The section on Scripture in the Catechism covers the Patristic tradition of "spiritual exegesis" as further developed through the scholastic doctrine of the "four senses". The Catechism by specifies that the necessary spiritual interpretation should be sought through the four senses of Scripture.

The literal sense pertains to the meaning of the words themselves, including any figurative meanings. The spiritual senses pertain to the significance of the things (persons, places, objects or events) denoted by the words. Of the three spiritual senses, the allegorical sense is foundational. It relates persons, events, and institutions of earlier covenants to those of later covenants, and especially to the New Covenant. Building on the allegorical sense, the moral sense instructs in regard to action, and the anagogical sense points to man's final destiny. The teaching of the Catechism on Scripture has encouraged the pursuit of covenantal theology, an approach that employs the four senses to structure salvation history via the biblical covenants.

=== Paragraph 2267 (capital punishment) ===
One of the changes in the 1997 update consisted of the inclusion of the position on the death penalty that is defended in John Paul II's encyclical Evangelium vitae of 1995.

The paragraph dealing with the death penalty (2267) was revised again by Pope Francis in 2018.

The text previously stated (1997):

Assuming that the guilty party's identity and responsibility have been fully determined, the traditional teaching of the Church does not exclude recourse to the death penalty, if this is the only possible way of effectively defending human lives against the unjust aggressor.

If, however, non-lethal means are sufficient to defend and protect people's safety from the aggressor, authority will limit itself to such means, as these are more in keeping with the concrete conditions of the common good and more in conformity to the dignity of the human person.

Today, in fact, as a consequence of the possibilities which the state has for effectively preventing crime, by rendering one who has committed an offense incapable of doing harm – without definitely taking away from him the possibility of redeeming himself – the cases in which the execution of the offender is an absolute necessity "are very rare, if not practically nonexistent."

The 2018 change to the Catechism reads:

Recourse to the death penalty on the part of legitimate authority, following a fair trial, was long considered an appropriate response to the gravity of certain crimes and an acceptable, albeit extreme, means of safeguarding the common good.

Today, however, there is an increasing awareness that the dignity of the person is not lost even after the commission of very serious crimes. In addition, a new understanding has emerged of the significance of penal sanctions imposed by the state. Lastly, more effective systems of detention have been developed, which ensure the due protection of citizens but, at the same time, do not definitively deprive the guilty of the possibility of redemption.

Consequently, the Church teaches, in the light of the Gospel, that "the death penalty is inadmissible because it is an attack on the inviolability and dignity of the person", and the Catholic Church works with determination for its abolition worldwide.

== Reception ==
In 1992, cardinal Joseph Ratzinger (later Pope Benedict XVI) stated:

[The Catechism of the Catholic Church] clearly show[s] that the problem of what we must do as human beings, of how we should live our lives so that we and the world may become just, is the essential problem of our day, and basically of all ages. After the fall of ideologies, the problem of man—the moral problem—is presented to today's context in a totally new way: What should we do? How does life become just? What can give us and the whole world a future which is worth living? Since the catechism treats these questions, it is a book which interests many people, far beyond purely theological or ecclesial circles.

Ulf Ekman, former Charismatic pastor and the founder of Livets Ord, says that the Catechism is "the best book he has ever read".

== Derived works ==
The Compendium of the Catechism of the Catholic Church was published in 2005, and the first edition in English in 2006. It is a more concise, dialogic and illustrated version of the Catechism. The text of the Compendium is available in fourteen languages on the Vatican website, which also gives the text of the Catechism itself in ten languages.

Youcat is a 2011 publication aimed at helping youth understand the Catechism.

Cardinal Francis Arinze commented in 2023 on the need for pamphlets and booklets to communicate the contents of specific aspects of the Catechism and the Compendium of the Social Doctrine of the Church, because of their size.

== See also ==
- Catechism of Saint Pius X
- Roman Catechism
- The Common Catechism
- Baltimore Catechism
- Catholic catechesis
- Catholic spirituality
- History of the Catholic Church since 1962
- Christ – Our Pascha
- Outline of Catholicism
- Pastoral care in Catholicism
- Timeline of the Catholic Church
