= Baltimore Catechism =

Catholic catechism for children in the U.S.

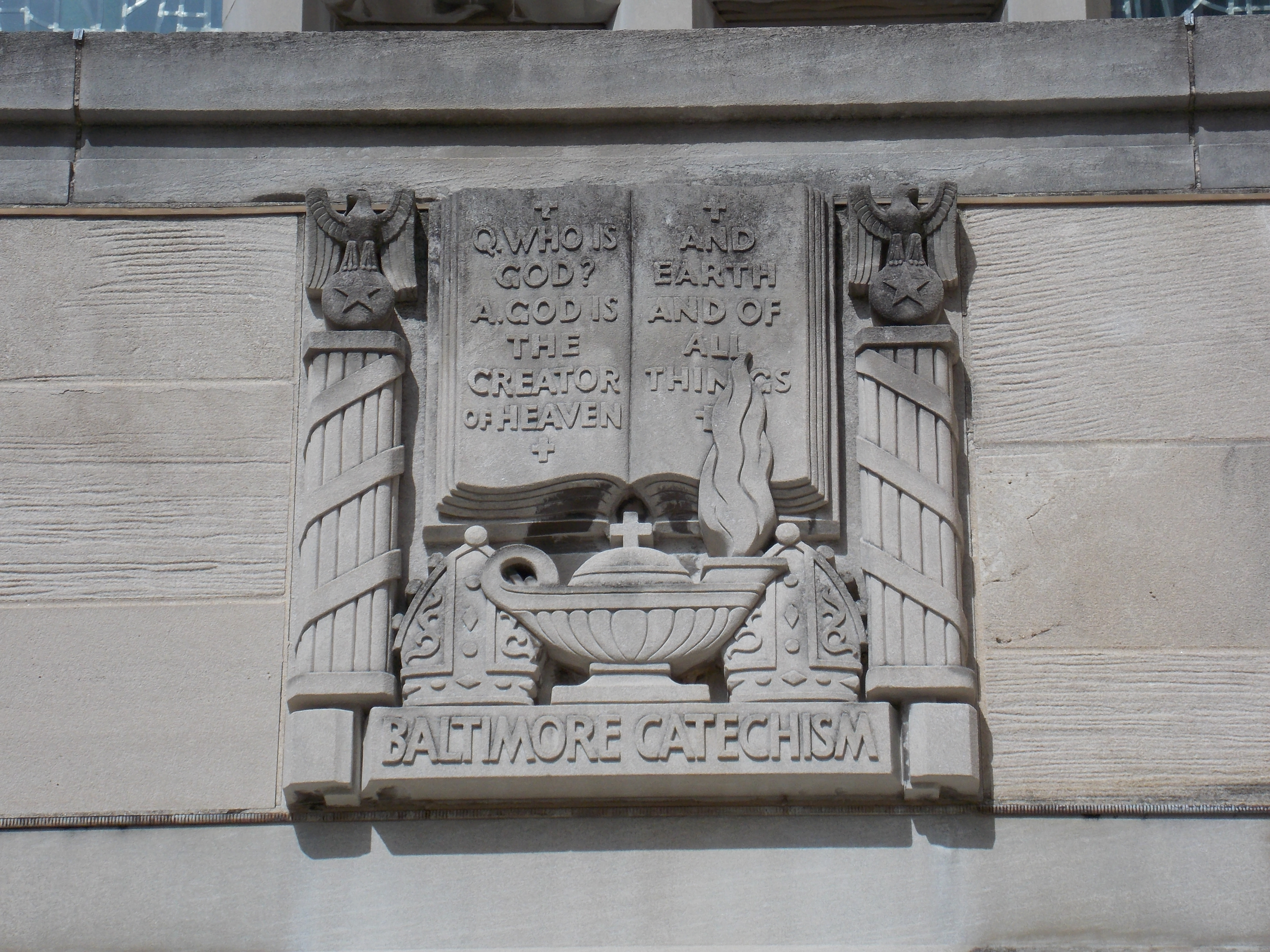
Baltimore Catechism relief on the Cathedral of Mary Our Queen, Baltimore

A Catechism of Christian Doctrine, Prepared and Enjoined by Order of the Third Council of Baltimore, or simply the Baltimore Catechism, was the national Catholic catechism for children in the United States, based on Robert Bellarmine's 1614 Small Catechism. The first such catechism written for Catholics in North America, it was the standard Catholic school text in the country from 1885 to the late 1960s. From its publication, however, there were calls to revise it, and many other catechisms were used during this period. It was officially replaced by the United States Catholic Catechism for Adults in 2004, based on the revised universal Catechism of the Catholic Church.

In response to a personal copyright taken out by Bishop John Lancaster Spalding, various editions include annotations or other modifications. While the approved text had to remain the same in the catechisms, by adding maps, glossaries or definitions publishers could copyright and sell their own version of the catechism. The Baltimore Catechism was widely used in many Catholic schools until many moved away from catechism-based education, though it is still used in some.

== History ==
In the nineteenth century, repeated efforts had been made in the United States towards an arrangement by which a uniform textbook of Christian doctrine might be used by all Catholics. As early as 1829, the bishops assembled in the First Provincial Council of Baltimore decreed: "A catechism shall be written which is better adapted to the circumstances of this Province; it shall give the Christian Doctrine as explained in Cardinal Bellarmine's Catechism (1597), and when approved by the Holy See, it shall be published for the common use of Catholics" (Decr. xxxiii). The clause recommending Bellarmine's catechism as a model was added at the special request of the Sacred Congregation for the Propagation of the Faith. Bellarmine's Small Catechism, Italian text with English translation, was published in Boston in 1853.

The wish of the bishops was not carried out and the First and Second Plenary Councils of Baltimore (1852 and 1866) repeated the decree of 1829. In the Third Plenary Council (1884) many bishops were in favor of a "revised" edition of a 1775 catechism by Archbishop Butler from Ireland, but finally the matter was given into the hands of a committee of six bishops. At last, in 1885, was issued A Catechism of Christian Doctrine, Prepared and Enjoined by Order of the Third Council of Baltimore. The council had desired a catechism "perfect in every respect" (Acta et Decr., pp. 219). Nearly every U.S. bishop gave the new national catechism his official approbation and many schools adopted it, but it also received considerable criticism. In 1895, only ten years after publication, the American archbishops began a process of revision, but this was abandoned due to a lack of consensus. Between 1885 and 1941 over 100 other Catholic catechetical manuals were published in America with official imprimaturs, although none was as widely used as the "Baltimore Catechism".

Soon various editions came forth with additions of word-meanings, explanatory notes, some even with different arrangements, so that soon there was a considerable diversity in the books that go by the name of Baltimore Catechism. The Baltimore Catechism became the standard text for Catholic education in the United States for the next four generations. Since the 1960s, many Catholic churches and schools have moved away from catechism-based education.

== Original volumes ==
The standard edition was created by Fr. Januarius de Concilio during the Council and published on 6 April 1885. This catechism contained 421 questions. Then for no known reason Bishop John Lancaster Spalding deleted many of the questions, reordering some, to make an abridged version containing 208 questions. This shorter catechism he identified as "number 1." However, the questions retained their original numbering; so, for example, in Lesson First the reader finds Q1, Q2, Q3, Q6, Q9. In September 1885 Bishop Spalding registered a separate copyright under his own name for what became commonly known as Baltimore Catechism Number 1. Since the standard text was larger, people and publishers came to refer to it as Baltimore Catechism Number 2.

== Revised volumes ==
Later in the twentieth century the United States bishops decided to update the Baltimore Catechism. During the process they were determined to address the handful of criticisms that scholars had raised against the original. For example, the 1885 version was primarily written by one man, Fr. De Concilio. So the revised edition involved hundreds of theologians, scholars and teachers. The original was primarily written in ten days while the revised versions took years, in a long process of review and editing. Whereas Fr. De Concilio crafted one text which he intended for use by all schoolchildren, the revised text resulted not in one catechism, but a series of texts for different ages and grades. The Episcopal committee for the Confraternity of Christian Doctrine (CCD), engaged Fr. Francis J. Connell, professor of Moral Theology at the Catholic University of America, as editor and theological advisor in the production of the graded texts during the 1940s.

- Volume 1. – The 33 lessons contained in Baltimore Catechism No. 1 present the basics of the Catholic faith in a manner suitable for first communicants through fifth graders.
- Volume 2. – The 37 lessons contained in Baltimore Catechism No. 2 present the fundamentals of the Catholic Faith in a manner suitable for sixth through ninth graders and those preparing for Confirmation.
- Volume 3. – The 37 lessons contained in Baltimore Catechism No. 3 are intended for students who have received their Confirmation and/or high schoolers. It includes additional questions, definitions, examples, and applications that build upon the content of the original Baltimore Catechism (No. 2).
- Volume 4. – An Explanation of the Baltimore Catechism can be used as a reference work, or as a teacher's manual for the original Baltimore Catechisms. It is often used as an advanced textbook. Its explanations of many little known questions pertaining to the Catholic Faith are designed to reward the questioning reader.

== See also ==
- Catechism of the Catholic Church (1994) – current official universal catechism for the Catholic Church
- Catechism of the Council of Trent (1570) – or the Roman Catechism – previous official universal catechism for the Catholic Church
- United States Catholic Catechism for Adults (2006) – current official national catechism for the United States
