= Docat =

Docat is a catechism for youth of Catholic social doctrine, released in 2016. It is a follow-up and companion volume to Youcat.

Docat is a popular adaptation of the social doctrine of the Catholic Church. It draws on Scripture, Youcat, the Catechism and the Compendium of Catholic Social Teaching, and features a foreword by Pope Francis. It was officially released at World Youth Day 2016 in Kraków, Poland. Docat is written with help from church and business leaders, social activists and young people. It shows Catholics how to apply Gospel values to poverty, imbalance of wealth, employment and unemployment, the use of natural resources and environmental concerns, terrorism, immigration and abortion, among other topics. As part of the release, a DOCAT app has been made available. The app helps readers to start groups, participate in discussions, and do acts of justice.

== Literature ==
- Docat: What to Do? Youcat Foundation. Ignatius Press 2016 ISBN 9781621640493
