= Werenfried =

Werenfried is a given name. Notable people with the name include:

- Werenfried of Elst (died c. 780), Benedictine monk, priest and missionary among the Frisians
- Werenfried van Straaten (1913–2003), Dutch Catholic priest and social activist
