= The Common Catechism =

Ecumenical Christian catechism

The Common Catechism: A Book of Christian Faith is an ecumenical Christian catechism that is the result of Catholic-Protestant dialogue and work. It was first published in 1973 and is the first joint catechism published by theologians of the Catholic Church, and the Lutheran Church and the Reformed Church, among other Protestant traditions, since the Reformation:

The Common Catechism is ecumenical not only in drawing on the resources of scholars of many nations, but also on all the major Western Christian traditions. The three primary traditions, of course, are the Calvinist, the Lutheran, and the Roman Catholic, each of which has stamped its character on more than a score of major religious denominations, with the dominant emphasis developing along the lines of "Protestant" and "Catholic" or, as with the churches of the Anglican Communion, in a fusion of both. The Common Catechism will thus be of universal import to all the Christian churches and will be a source of enlightenment and encouragement to every individual Christian.

The Christian theologians writing the text "trust that their common witness will arouse each individual Christian to a joint testimony of faith in the Christian life". The Common Catechism is interdenominational in that it presents "a joint account of the Christian faith" and is regarded as a major fruit of ecumenical commitment.

== See also ==
- Concelebration
- Open communion
- Catechism of the Catholic Church
- Luther's Catechism (disambiguation)
- Westminster Catechism
