= Christoph Pezel =

German theologian (1539-1604)

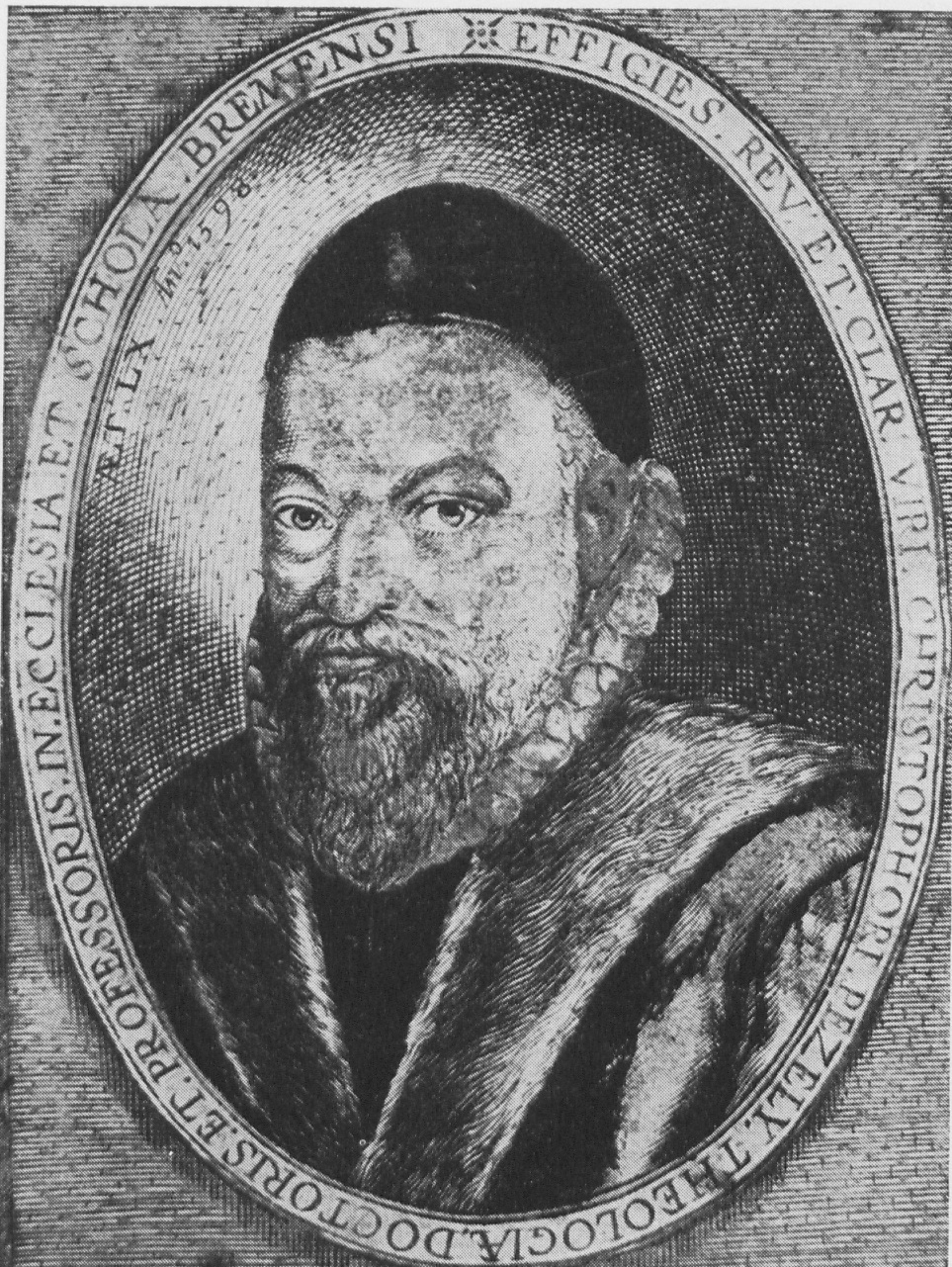
Christoph Pezel, 1598

Christoph Pezel (5 March 1539 – 24 February 1604) was an influential Reformed Theologian who introduced the Reformed confession to Nassau-Dillenburg and Bremen.

== Education and service in Saxony ==
Pezel was born in Plauen and educated at the universities of Jena and Wittenberg, his studies at the latter institution being interrupted by his teaching for several years. In 1557 he was appointed professor in the philosophical faculty and in 1569 was ordained preacher at the Schlosskirche in Wittenberg. In the same year he entered the theological faculty, where he soon became involved in the disputes between the followers of Melanchthon and Luther, writing the Apologia verae doctrinae de definitione Evangelii (Wittenberg, 1571) and being the chief author of the Wittenberg catechism of 1571. He soon took a leading position as a zealous Philippist, but in 1574 he and his colleagues were summoned to Torgau and required to give up the Calvinistic theory of the Lord's Supper. As they refused to subscribe to the articles presented to them, they were placed under surveillance in their own houses and forbidden to discuss or to print anything on the questions in dispute. They were afterward deposed from their professorships, and in 1576 were banished. Pezel, who had hitherto been at Zeitz, now went to Eger; but in 1577, like his fellow exiles, received a position from Count John of Nassau, first at the school in Siegen and later at Dillingen.

== Ministry in Nassau and Bremen ==
Pezel then definitely accepted Calvinism, and the Church in Dillenburg was united to the Calvinistic body. In 1578 he became pastor at Herborn, and in 1580 was permitted by Count John to go for a few weeks to Bremen to try to reconcile the Church difficulties between the Calvinists and Lutherans. His task was difficult, however, since the Lutheran Jodocus Glanaeus refused to meet him in open debate. The civil authorities, construing this as contumacy, deposed Glanaeus, and Pezel preached in his place. He soon returned to Nassau, but in 1581 was permanently appointed the successor of Glanaeus at Bremen, where, four years later, he was made superintendent of the churches and schools. At the same time he became pastor of the Liebfrauenkirche, though he also retained his pastorate at the Ansgariikirche till 1598. He took an active part in improving and extending the work at the Bremen gymnasium, where he was professor of theology, moral philosophy, and history, being also the leader in all the theological controversies in which the Bremen church became involved. Pezel did away with Luther's Catechism, substituting for it his own Bremen catechism, which remained in force until the eighteenth century, removed images and pictures from the churches, formed a ministerium which united the clergy, and, by his Consensus ministerii Bremensis ecclesiæ of 1595, prepared the way for the complete acceptance of Calvinistic doctrine. Pezel died in Bremen, aged 64.

== Works ==
Pezel was the editor Of many theological writings, of which the most important were the Loci theologici of his teacher, Victorinus Strigel (4 parts, Neustadt, 1581–84); Philip Melanchthon's Consilia (1600); and Caspar Peucer's Historia carcerum et liberationis divinae (Zurich, 1605); while among his independent works special mention may be made of the following: Argumenta et objectiones de praecipuis articulis doctrinae Christianae (Neustadt, 1580–89); Libellus precationum (1585); and Mellificium historicum, complectens historiam trium monarchiarum, Chaldaicae, Persicae, Graecae (1592). He is particularly interesting as showing the evolution from Melanchthon's attitude toward predestination to the complete determinism of the Calvinistic concept of the dogma.
