= Laurence Vaux =

English canon regular

Laurence Vaux (Vose) (1519–1585) was an English canon regular. He died while imprisoned for being a Catholic priest.

== Life ==
Vaux was born in Blackrod, Lancashire. Educated at Manchester and the University of Oxford, he was ordained in 1542, and took the degree of B. D. at Oxford in 1556. He was first a fellow, and then, 1558, warden of Manchester College, a parish church which had been endowed as a collegiate by Thomas la Warr, 5th Baron De La Warr, in 1421, and re-established by Mary I of England, in 1557.

In 1559 Elizabeth I's ecclesiastical commissioners held a visitation in Manchester College, and summoned the warden and fellows before them. However, knowing what to expect, Vaux had removed himself and the college deeds and church plate (precious vessels used in worship) to a place of safe hiding. He was now a marked man, and after a time he took refuge in Louvain, 1561. Here he seems to have kept a school for the children of the English exiles, then comparatively numerous, for whom in fact he compiled a catechism.

Meanwhile, in England there was considerable uncertainty among Catholics as to how far it was lawful to conform outwardly with the State religion. Pius V commissioned two of the exiles at Louvain, Doctors Sanders and Harding, to publish his decision, informing the Catholics that to frequent the Established services was a mortal sin. Vaux was in Rome in 1566; in a private audience the pope instructed him more fully as to the scope of his decision, and finally the task of making known the papal sentence in England was delegated to him. He returned therefore and conducted a vigorous and successful campaign against the schismatical practice, especially in his native Lancashire. This activity drew down the anger of the Government on his head, and in February 1568, a queen's writ was issued for his arrest; this document mentions also Cardinal Allen, though he was not in the country at the time. Vaux again escaped and returned to Louvain.

Here, now at the age of fifty-four, he sought and obtained admission among the canons regular in the Priory of St. Martin's. He was clothed in the habit on St. Lawrence's Day, 10 August 1572, and made his profession the following May. Before taking the vows he drew up a legal document to provide for the safe custody of the deeds and valuables which he had saved from the commissioners at Manchester, "until such time as the college should be restored to the Catholic Faith, or until Catholics should live in it". Shortly after his profession he was appointed sub-prior; and when the prior resigned in 1577, to pass over to the Carthusians, there was a strong movement to elect Vaux in his stead. Some, however, apparently feared that he would use his position to introduce a large number of his fellow-countrymen with a view to training them for the English Mission; a marginal note in the "Priory Chronicle" records, "Caenobium nostrum in seminarium pene erectum Anglorum."

Three years later at the instance of Allen, he was summoned to Reims by papal authority to take up once more the perilous missionary work in England; the Chronicle notes his departure "with the blessing and leave of his Prior", 24 June 1580. Vaux left Reims on 1 August, and Boulogne on the 12th, arriving that day at Dover in company with a Catholic soldier named Tichborne and a Frenchman, who turned traitor. Escaping detection at Dover, the two Englishmen passed on to Canterbury, and thence to Rochester, where they were arrested on information lodged by the spy.

After several examinations Vaux was finally committed by the Bishop of London to the Gatehouse Prison, Westminster. According to an account of the arrest in the "Douay Diaries", Bishop Aylmer demanded: "What relation are you to that Vaux who wrote a popish catechism in English?" Vaux admitted his authorship.

For the first three years of his imprisonment, owing chiefly to the wealth and influence of noble friends, Vaux was treated with comparative mildness. In a letter which he sent to the Prior of St. Martin's a few months after his arrest he speaks quite cheerfully of his condition and surroundings. But later another letter addressed to John Coppage, August 1583, was intercepted and the following sentence underlined by some member of the Council: My friends here be many and of much worship, especially since my Catechism came forth. This communication also mentioned the disposal of as many as 300 copies in the Manchester district alone. Thereupon the aged confessor was transferred to the Clink, Southwark, London, where he died.

According to John Strype, he was brought up again before Aylmer, in 1585, and found guilty "and so in danger of death"; no further information survives.

The common tradition is represented by this contemporary item from St. Martin's Chronicle:

"The venerable Father Lawrence Vaux, martyr. . .for the confession of the Catholic Faith thrown into prison, where he was starved to death, and so gained the crown of martyrdom, 1585."

== Catechism ==
Vaux's catechism was first published in Louvain, in 1567. Six further editions in rapid succession, emanating from Antwerp and Liège, testified to its widespread popularity and effectiveness. The catechism is practically formed on the same lines as its successor of today, explaining in sequence the Apostles' Creed, the Pater and Ave (but the latter has not the second half, Holy Mary), the Commandments (these at considerable length), the sacraments, and the offices of Christian justice.

Thomas Graves Law reprinted the Liège issue of 1583, with a biographical introduction, for the Chetham Society in 1885. This edition contains also Vaux's paper on "The Use and Meaning of Ceremonies", and a few further pages of instruction added by the Liège publisher. The treatise on the ceremonies discusses the use of holy water, candles, incense, vestments, etc.
