= Aid to the Church in Need =

International pastoral aid organization of the Catholic Church

- German: Kirche in Not
- Aid to the Church in Need logo (2018).
- Founder: Werenfried van Straaten
- Founded at: West Germany
- Type: pastoral aid organization
- Location: Königstein im Taunus
- Region served: International
- President: Cardinal Kurt Koch
- Parent organization: Catholic Church
- Website: acninternational.org

Aid to the Church in Need (German: Kirche in Not, Italian: Aiuto alla Chiesa che Soffre, French: Aide à l'Eglise en détresse, Portuguese: Ajuda à Igreja que Sofre Polish: Pomoc Kościołowi w Potrzebie, Dutch: Kerk in Nood, Slovak: Pomoc trpiacej Cirkvi, Korean: 고통받는 교회 돕기, Latin: Auxilium Patienti Ecclesiae) is an international Catholic pastoral aid organization, which yearly offers financial support to more than 5,000 projects worldwide.

Aid to the Church in Need's General Secretariat and Project Headquarters is in Königstein, Germany. With 23 national offices, Aid to the Church in Need provides aid to Catholic communities in around 140 countries around the world. In 2021, the foundation funded 5,298 projects in 132 countries; in 2023, it funded 5,573 projects in 138 countries; in 2024, it funded 5,335 projects in 138 countries; in 2025 it funded 5368 projects in 141 countries.

== History ==
The roots of Aid to the Church in Need (ACN) go back to the time after World War II. For the Dutch priest Werenfried van Straaten the Stunde Null was the starting point of his life's work. In 1947 he founded Aid to the Eastern Priests, centred in Belgium, aimed mostly at providing material and pastoral support to displaced Germans, including Catholic priests from Eastern Germany. Although the initial goal was to aid refugees who fled or were expelled from Eastern Europe in the wake of the Second World War, many of them Catholic, in 1952 the organisation began to work to help persecuted Christians behind the Iron Curtain. In 1961, work spread to Christians in difficulty in Asia, and in 1965 to Africa.

In 1984, ACN was recognised as a Universal Public Association of Pontifical Right, and later, during his pontificate, in December 2011, Pope Benedict XVI recognised the importance of Aid to the Church in Need's work by elevating the charity to a Pontifical Foundation of the Catholic Church. At the same time, the Pope appointed the Prefect of the Congregation for the Clergy, Cardinal Mauro Piacenza, to the position of President of the Foundation. Cardinal Piacenza retired in 2025, at which point Pope Leo XIV named Cardinal Kurt Koch to succeed him. The executive president is Regina Lynch, and the secretary general is Ferdinand von Habsburg.

By a personal decision of Pope John Paul II, in 1992, following the end of communism across most of Eastern Europe, ACN begins to work towards dialogue with the Russian Orthodox Church, and in 2007 Benedict XVI asks the organisation to intensify its work in the Middle East, as Christians face rising persecution there.

In 2019 Aid to the Church in Need becomes involved in the Safeguarding project, helping local churches to introduce measures to prevent abuse, and encouraging safeguarding courses for priests and religious worldwide.

== Religious Freedom in the World Report ==
Every two years ACN publishes an exhaustive report on the state of religious freedom across the world. The report highlights cases of persecution and takes religious freedom as a whole, not limiting its analysis to Christian or Catholic communities.

The first report was published by ACN Italy in 1999. It now examines 196 countries along almost 800 pages, is published in six languages, and tracks evolution of Religious Freedom in each country compared to previous years.

The 2023 report found that "persecution increased since January 2021, while impunity continues to be the rule when it comes to attackers, including oppressive governments."

The 2025 report noted that more than 5.4 billion people, around two thirds of the world's population, live in countries without full religious freedom. In its analysis of 196 countries, ACN found serious violations of religious freedom in 62 of them, classifying 24 as countries of "persecution" and 38 as "discrimination". Of countries previously classed as having a negative record on religious freedom only two, Kazakhstan and Sri Lanka, showed signs of improvement. ACN's Marcela Szymanski presented the main findings of the report at an event at the European Parliament in December. ACN launched an international petition at the same time as the report was published, calling on international actors to support and promote the right to religious freedom worldwide.

== Persecuted & Forgotten? ==
While the Religious Freedom in the World Report covers all religions and all countries, every other year ACN publishes a report focusing exclusively on the persecution of Christians, called "Persecuted & Forgotten?" (P&F). The report is compiled by ACN's UK national office.

In 2026 the foundation launched the tenth edition of P&F, which concluded that the situation for Christians had worsened in 10 of the 18 countries covered by the report.

== Red Week ==
Red Week is an annual event held in November which calls attention to persecution of Christians all over the world. aimed at calling attention to the issue of persecution of Christians. In some countries the event is concentrated on a particular Wednesday and labelled #RedWednesday.

It traces its roots to Brazil in 2015, when the local ACN office had the Christ the Redeemer monument lit in red to mark the persecution of Christians in Iraq. In April 2016, inspired by the same idea, ACN Italy illuminated the Trevi Fountain. ACN UK took the idea further and created #RedWednesday to commemorate all persecuted Christians on a specific Wednesday in November, and this was later expanded to a whole week in many countries. Currently, events held during the whole month, in over a dozen countries, though the term #RedWeek is still used.

In 2022 more than 600 buildings in at least 17 countries were illuminated in red between 16 and 23 November to remind people about religious freedom and the situation of persecuted Christians all over the world. Pope Francis specifically thanked Polish Catholics for their participation in Red Week events in November 2022, and UK Prime-Minister Rishi Sunak mentioned the event in Parliament in 2023, calling it "an important moment to demonstrate our solidarity with Christians and all those persecuted around the world for their religion or belief”, before adding: “I’m pleased that today we will light up Foreign, Commonwealth and Development Office buildings in the UK in red in support”.

Although ACN is a Catholic organisation, Red Week and Red Wednesday highlight the persecution of all Christians, and events in different countries have had the backing of other religious confessions.

=== Red Wednesday ===
Red Wednesday (sometimes rendered #RedWednesday) developed from, and is part of, the Red Week initiative. Besides organising conferences and other events, the date is often marked by the lighting in red of houses of worship or public buildings.

Celebrating the date on a chosen Wednesday, rather than marking the entire Red Week, has occurred mostly in English speaking countries with ACN offices, including the United Kingdom, Canada and Australia, but also in others, such as the Philippines.

In the UK, the date has become politically significant, with the Anglican bishop of Truro, Philip Mounstephen, recommending its adoption by the Government, in his report on the reform of the Foreign Office and its handling of the issue of persecution of Christians. In 2023, prime-minister Rishi Sunak mentioned Red Wednesday while answering questions in Parliament, describing it as "an important moment to demonstrate our solidarity with Christians and all those persecuted around the world for their religion or belief". The date has taken on an ecumenical dimension in the UK, having received backing by the aforementioned Anglican Bishop of Truro, as well as the Coptic Orthodox Archbishop Angaelos of London

In 2023, the UK national office of ACN established the first "Courage to be a Christian" award, which was given to Margaret and Dominic Attah, from Nigeria, in representation of the scores of victims of the Pentecost Sunday church attack in Owo, Ondo State, Nigeria, which took place on 5 June. 2022. Margaret Attah, a nurse, lost both her legs in the attack, which killed over 40 people and wounded over 80. The 2024 award went to Ribqa Nevash, from Pakistan, for advocating for the rights of Christians, and the 2025 award went to Tobias Yahaya, a catechist from Nigeria who was stabbed by a Muslim neighbour and then forgave him.

== One Million Children Praying the Rosary ==
Every year during October, Aid to the Church in Need partners with other organisations to promote the “One Million Children Praying the Rosary” campaign. The campaign's goal is to get as many young people as possible, all over the world, to pray for peace.

The initiative began in 2005 in Venezuela, and ACN became involved in 2017.

Families, churches, schools, movements or individuals can sign up for the event online, providing an estimate of the number of children taking part. In 2022, according to this data, at least 840 thousand people from 140 countries prayed for the same intentions on 18 October, with Pope Francis mentioning the event and asking people to take part during his Angelus address.

Pope Leo publicly acknowledged the initiative in 2025, when he thanked participants in a social media post.

In 2026 the initiative officially surpassed the one million marker, with a total of 1,351,515 registered on the website.

== Child’s Bible ==
The “Child’s Bible – God Speaks to his children” was first published by ACN in 1979. The book includes illustrated key stories of the Old and New Testaments, and the purpose is to contribute to evangelisation, allowing children and others to read the Bible stories in their own languages.

Since first being published, the Child’s Bible has been translated into 193 languages, including many tribal languages. In some cases, according to the organisation, it was the first book published in that specific language.

In total, over 51 million copies of the Bible have been printed and distributed among different linguistic communities.

== YouCat Foundation ==
The YouCat Foundation, which organises, publishes and distributes copies of the catechetical series of books for youth YouCat, is a subsidiary of Aid to the Church in Need. ACN often cooperates in promoting and distributing editions of YouCat, such as during the Jubilee for Youth in 2025, where 100,000 copies of YouCat Confession were distributed to participants during an event in Rome.

== Sexual assault allegation ==
In 2021, Die Zeit published an article which made known the existence of a letter from 2010 indicating that Werenfried van Straaten was accused of committing sexual assault in 1973 against a 20-year-old woman working for the charity. In a statement consisting of questions and answers, the charity responded to the disclosure and noted that "ACN deeply regrets the serious allegations and condemns any kind of behavior of which Father van Straaten has been accused in the article."
