= Francisco Foreiro =

- Born: 1523; Lisbon (Portugal)
- Died: 15 February 1581 (aged 57–58); Almada (Portugal)
- Occupations: Prior of the Convent of Lisbon; Provincial of Dominican Order; Confessor to king John III and to Infanta Maria, Qualificator of the Inquisition
- Years active: Council of Trent
- Notable work: Index Librorum Prohibitorum; Breviary
- Religion: Roman Catholic
- Denomination: Dominican Order

Francisco Foreiro (Latin: Francis Forrerius or Francis Forerius; 1523 – 15 February 1581) was a Portuguese Dominican theologian and biblist.

== Biography ==
Born in 1523 in Lisbon, he studied arts and theology and entered among the Dominicans in February 1539.

King John III sent him to study theology in the university of Paris and, on his return to Lisbon, he appointed Foreiro his preacher. Prince Louis at the same time entrusted to him the education of his son, António.

He was one of the greatest theologians of the Council of Trent where he participated as delegate of Sebastian I, King of Portugal (1561) then he contributed to the production of the council minutes.

In 1566, by order of the Pope Pius V and the Council of Trent and with assistance of Muzio Calini, Archbishop of Zara, Egidio Foscarari, Bishop of Modena, he helped Leonardo Marini (it), Archbishop of Lanciano, to compose the famous Roman Catechism: Catechismus Romanus vulgo dictus ex decreto Concilii Tridentini compositus et Pii V jussu editus.

He was the main editor of the Index Librorum Prohibitorum and the Roman Breviary, which were used by the Roman Church throughout four centuries.

He translated from the Hebrew to Latin the Book of Job, the Book of Psalms, the Song of Solomon and the Nevi'im.

He authored also a Latin commentary of the Book of Isaiah: Iesaiae prophetae vetus et noua ex hebraico versio.

Francisco Foreiro was prior of the Convent of Lisbon (1564) and provincial of his order. He was confessor to King John III and to Infanta Maria (daughter of King Manuel I), qualificator of the Portuguese Inquisition, and deputy of the tribunal of conscience, and of the military orders. He died in Almada 15 February 1581.

== Miscellaneous ==
A street in Lisbon is named after him: Rua Frei Francisco Foreiro from Rua de Arroios toward Av. Almirante Reis.
