= Christ – Our Pascha =

Catechism of the Ukrainian Greek Catholic Church

Christ – Our Pascha (Христос — наша Пасха) is the catechism of the Ukrainian Greek Catholic Church, published in 2012. It was published by the Synod of the Ukrainian Greek-Catholic Church and the Commission for the Catechism of the Ukrainian Greek Catholic Church.

Christ – our Pascha, while being an official document of the doctrine, is by its nature a local catechism in relation to the Catechism of the Catholic Church. Ukrainian Greek Catholic Church is the largest of the Byzantine Rite churches in communion with Roman Catholic Church. Christ – Our Pascha, which was written for about 20 years, is also first Ukrainian Catholic catechism since the catechism written by Josaphat Kuntsevych over 400 years ago.

== English translation ==
- Catechism of the Ukrainian Catholic Church: Christ – Our Pascha. Edmonton 2016. ISBN 0980930928
