= Egidio Foscarari =

Italian Dominican theologian

Most Reverend Egidio Foscarari
- Bishop of Modena
- Church: Catholic Church
- Diocese: Diocese of Modena
- Appointed: 23 May 1550
- In office: 1550-1564
- Predecessor: Giovanni Gerolamo Morone
- Successor: Giovanni Gerolamo Morone

Personal details
- Born: January 27, 1512 Bologna, Italy
- Died: 23 December 1564 (aged 52) Rome, Italy
- Buried: Santa Maria sopra Minerva

Egidio Foscarari O.P. (Latin: Aegidius Foscherarius) (January 27, 1512 in Bologna – December 23, 1564 in Rome) was an Italian Dominican theologian who was Bishop of Modena (1550–1564).

== Biography ==
Egidio Foscarari was born at Bologna, January 27, 1512. He entered the Dominican Order, and in 1544 became prior and inquisitor at his native place. In 1546 he was appointed Master of the Sacred Palace (official papal theologian) by Pope Paul III, and was one of the examiners of the Spiritual Exercises of Ignatius Loyola. He was appointed Bishop of Modena on 23 May 1550 by Pope Paul III, by arrangement with Cardinal Morone. He attended the sessions of the Council of Trent in 1551 and 1552. Arrested by the Roman Inquisition in January 1558, he spent seven months in the Castel Sant'Angelo, only to be completely exonerated on 1 January 1560, after the death of Pope Paul IV. He again attended the Council of Trent in 1562 and 1563. He assisted Francisco Foreiro and Leonardo Marini in preparing the Roman Catechism, and correcting the Missal and Breviary. He died in Rome on 23 December 1564, according to his tombstone in Santa Maria sopra Minerva.

He was frugal, modest, and austere, and devoted much time and money to the poor and to the reclamation of the vicious classes.

== Bibliography ==
- This article incorporates public domain material from McClintock, John; Strong, James (1867–1887). Cyclopædia of Biblical, Theological and Ecclesiastical Literature. Harper and Brothers.
