= Joseph Deharbe =

German theologian

Joseph Deharbe (11 April 1800 at Strasbourg, Alsace – 8 November 1871 at Maria-Laach) was a French Jesuit theologian and catechist.

== Life ==
He entered the Society of Jesus in 1817 and after teaching for eleven years at the Jesuit College at Brieg, Switzerland, he became in 1840 a missionary and catechist in Köthen, Germany. With another Jesuit by the name of Rohe, he established at Lucerne in 1845 the academy of St. Charles Borromeo. In 1847 he left Switzerland, which had become hostile to Jesuits.

After that he was chiefly engaged in giving missions in Germany.

== Works ==
As a catechist in Köthen he felt the lack of a good catechism, and was encouraged by his superior, Johann Baptist Devis, to compose one. As a model he took the Mainz catechism of 1842 and made use also of other textbooks, notably of Bossuet's catechism. He completed his first catechism, called Katholischer Katechismus oder Lehrbegriff, in 1847.

In 1848 it appeared anonymously at Ratisbon and immediately won approval. Bishop Blum of Linsburg introduced it officially into his diocese the same year; the following year the bishops of Trier and Hildesheim did likewise for their dioceses. In 1850 the Bavarian bishops resolved to introduce a common catechism for the entire kingdom, and accepted Deharbe's catechism, which was then introduced in 1853. Other German dioceses adopted it as follows:

- Cologne, 1854
- Mainz and Paderborn, 1855
- Fulda, 1858
- Ermland, 1861
- Culm, 1863
- Gnesen-Posen, 1868

At the same time it spread outside of Germany, in Switzerland, Austria-Hungary, and the United States. It was translated in 1851 into Magyar, then into Bohemian, Italian, and French; into Swedish and Marathi, 1861; into Polish and Lithuanian, 1862; into Slovenian, 1868; into Danish, 1869; and later into Spanish and Portuguese. It was reintroduced into Bavaria in 1908. In a revised form, Austria adopted it in 1897.

Deharbe himself prepared and published at Ratisbon four extracts of his first work, titled

- Katholischer Katechismus (1847) (in English: A Complete Catechism of the Catholic Religion)
- Kleiner katholischer Katechismus (1847)
- Anfangsgründe der katholichen Lehre für die kleinen Schüler (1847)
- Kleiner katholischer Katechismus (1849–50).

He preserved catechetical tradition but abandoned the division of Peter Canisius, arranging the text-matter under chapters on Faith, Commandments, and Means of Grace.

His other works, all published at Ratisbon, are:

- Die vollkommene Liebe Gottes (1855)
- Erklärung des katholischen Katechismus (4 vols., 1857-64, fifth ed., (1880-)
- Kürzeres Handbuch zum Religionsunterrichte (1865–68, sixth ed., Linden ed., 1898).
