= Youcat =

Explanation of the Catechism of the Catholic Church

- Cover of the Youcat
- Author: Christoph Schönborn and others
- Original title: Katholischer Jugendkatechismus
- Translator: Michael J. Miller
- Illustrator: Alexander von Lengerke
- Cover artist: Alexander von Lengerke
- Language: German (Original)
- Subject: Catechism of the Catholic Church
- Published: 2011: Youcat Foundation gGmbH (Germany); Incorporated Catholic Truth Society (United Kingdom and Ireland); Ignatius Press (USA)
- Publication place: Germany
- Pages: 303
- ISBN: 978-1-86082-728-0
- Website: https://www.youcat.org/

Youcat, short for Youth Catechism of the Catholic Church, also styled as YOUCAT, is a 2011 publication that aims to be an aid for youth to better understand the Catechism of the Catholic Church. The book, presented in the form of questions and answers, is intended for use by Catholic youths around the world and is available in 25 languages, including Arabic and Chinese. Youcat is based on the Catechism of the Catholic Church and the Compendium of the Catechism of the Catholic Church (2005). The catechism has 304 pages and consists of four chapters with 527 questions and answers.

The guide, whose foreword was written by Pope Benedict XVI, was authored by Cardinal Christoph Schönborn and others. Approximately 700,000 copies of Youcat were distributed in thirteen different languages on behalf of the Pope during World Youth Day 2011 in Madrid.

YouCat books are published and distributed by the YouCat foundation, a subsidiary of Aid to the Church in Need foundation.

== Background ==
=== YOUCAT series ===
The international YOUCAT book series also includes:

A prayerbook:

- Georg von Lengerke / Dörte Schrömges, YOUCAT Youth Prayer Book, Munich 2011. ISBN 9781586177034

A confirmation book:

- Bernhard Meuser / Nils Baer, YOUCAT confirmation book, ISBN 9781586178352

A leader's guide for the confirmation course:

- Nils Baer, YOUCAT Confirmation Leader's Handbook ISBN 9781586178369

A catechism of Catholic social doctrine:

- Docat: What to Do? Youcat Foundation. Ignatius Press 2016 ISBN 9781621640493

A guide to confession:

- Dick, Klaus, YouCat Confession Book, ISBN 9781621642947

=== Errors ===
In some translations of the Youcat, such as French, Italian and Spanish, errors have been found that deviate from official doctrine regarding questions about many important issues such as euthanasia and contraception. The Vatican has announced that these mistakes will be corrected in future editions.
