= Dutch Catechism =

Cover of the first Dutch edition

The Dutch Catechism of 1966 (De Nieuwe Katechismus, geloofsverkondiging voor volwassenen; English translation: A New Catechism: Catholic Faith for Adults) was the first post-Vatican II Catholic catechism. It was commissioned and authorized by the Catholic hierarchy of the Netherlands. Its lead authors were Edward Schillebeeckx, O.P., the influential Dominican intellectual, and Piet Schoonenberg, S.J., a professor of dogmatic theology at the Catholic University of Nijmegen (whose works were censured by the Congregation for the Doctrine of the Faith on more than one occasion, because of problematic Christological views).

== Summary ==
The Dutch Catechism was intended by the bishops of the Netherlands "to make the message of Jesus Christ sound as new as it is." It also intended to carry an ecumenical message; its foreword states "Denominational differences, which shall not be blurred or ignored in this book, need not to be barriers. We hope that they may lead to discussions, where the human existence we share will receive further elucidation."

The catechism has five parts and one supplement. The first part reviews the mystery of existence. The second part discusses other religions and philosophies, including Buddhism, Hinduism, Islam, humanism, and Marxism, and the spirit of God in the world. A special section describes the way of Israel in terms of God's works, and Holy Scripture. The third part focuses on Christ. The way of Christ is subject of the fourth part. The final part focuses on the end of man, and his fulfillment in meeting God.

== Bestseller ==
Since 1967, it was translated into numerous languages and sold millions of copies in different editions. In 1967 Time magazine reported: "The Dutch catechism has become one of the year's religious bestsellers. Herder & Herder, publisher of the American edition, reports that its first printing of 75,000 copies was sold out in three weeks. ... In The Netherlands, where the catechism has sold more than 400,000 copies so far, its publishers report that ten new translations will go to press in 1968." The English translation was published contrary to the wishes of the Dutch bishops and failed to address doctrinal problems present in the work.

In the years following its issue, the Dutch Catechism was the only comprehensive book of its kind within the Church.

== Controversies ==
In Time the catechism was marketed as "a lively, undogmatic compendium of doctrine that reflects the most recent radical insights of theologians and scripture scholars." The views of professional theologians, however, tended to be more nuanced and critical.

=== Imprimatur ===
Bishop Robert Francis Joyce of Burlington, Vermont, withdrew his imprimatur (permission to publish) from the American edition, and the Netherlands' Cardinal Bernardus Johannes Alfrink noted that the book was going to press with an unauthorized use of his original imprimatur. Los Angeles' Cardinal James Francis McIntyre banned it from the church-run bookstore in his archdiocese. The stores operated by Boston's Daughters of St. Paul also refused to display it.

=== Accuracy ===
The questionable accuracy of certain statements in the text was soon widely recognized. At the request of Pope Paul VI, a high ranking commission of a wide variety of cardinals, including Charles Journet, Joseph Frings, Joseph-Charles Lefèbvre, Ermenegildo Florit, Michael Browne, and Lorenz Jaeger, under the coordination of the respected moral theologian Pietro Palazzini, convened to review the adequacy of several doctrinal formulations in the text. Issues of concern in the catechism's presentation of Catholic doctrine included the nature of creation and of original sin, Christological issues, the nature of the Mass and the Eucharist, the Church's infallibility, the nature of the priesthood, and various other points of moral and dogmatic theology. As a response to the Vatican commission, the Dutch bishops added the fifty page report as an appendix to the catechism.

=== Birth control ===
Birth control was a minor issue in the Dutch Catechism until the issuance of Humanae vitae (HV) by Pope Paul VI some three years later. The bishops of the Netherlands asked couples with questions to consult with doctors and priests, but ultimately to rely on their conscience. After HV, this position of the Dutch magisterium was hotly debated in the Church:

Are all methods of regulation birth of equal value to the Christian conscience? The council gave no answer to this question.

The Dutch magisterium refused to alter this and other texts, despite requests from Pope Paul VI. John Paul II convened a special synod in 1979, to deal with problems the Church faced in the Netherlands on a number of issues. Yet the bishops did not make changes in the authorized edition of their catechism.

== Evaluation ==
The cardinals did conclude their report on the Dutch Catechism with a positive note: "Through the preceding comments are not negligible, either in number or seriousness, they nonetheless leave by far the greatest part of the New Catechism untouched. So too, they support the praiseworthy intention of the authors."

The document of the magisterium of the Dutch bishops was unique in its scope until 1992, when the Vatican published its own comprehensive catechism, a scholarly work, which was primarily addressed to bishops, priests, and catechists. It invited national bishop conferences to issue their own catechisms for the faithful. "This catechism is given to them that it may be a sure and authentic reference text for teaching catholic doctrine and particularly for preparing local catechisms." Thus, the issuance of local catechisms, such as the Dutch Catechism, was confirmed, although Dutch views on particular theological issues remain controversial within the Church.

== Main quotes ==
- "The heart of the book is the message of Easter. If the news of Jesus' resurrection were removed, not one page of the book would have any value."
- "Until very recently, the Bible was regarded too much as a scientific manual and not enough as a story written to throw God's light on the existing world."
- "Openness to the (ecumenical) movement comes through prayer, through constant reform and renewal, through studying the sources of faith and each other's traditions, through readiness to abandon our well loved forms, through honest and patient dialogue, ... and this openness brings with it the tranquility and joy, which is of the good Spirit."
- "As everyone can ascertain nowadays, there are several methods of regulating births. The Second Vatican Council did not speak of any of these concrete methods ... This is a different standpoint than that taken under Pius XI some thirty years which was also maintained by his successor ... we can sense here a clear development in the Church, a development, which is also going on outside the Church."

== See also ==
- Spirit of Vatican II
- Modernism in the Catholic Church

== Sources ==
- A New Catechism: Catholic Faith for Adults: [Authorized Edition of the Dutch Catechism] with Supplement. New York: The Seabury Press. 1969. ISBN 0-8164-1070-4 – via Internet Archive.
