= Werenfried van Straaten =

Dutch Catholic priest

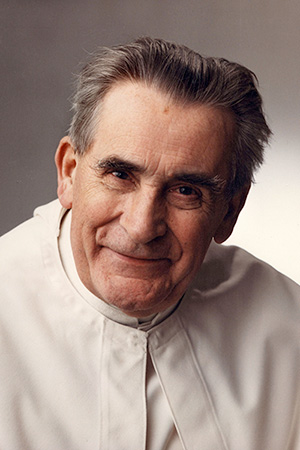
Father Werenfried van Straaten

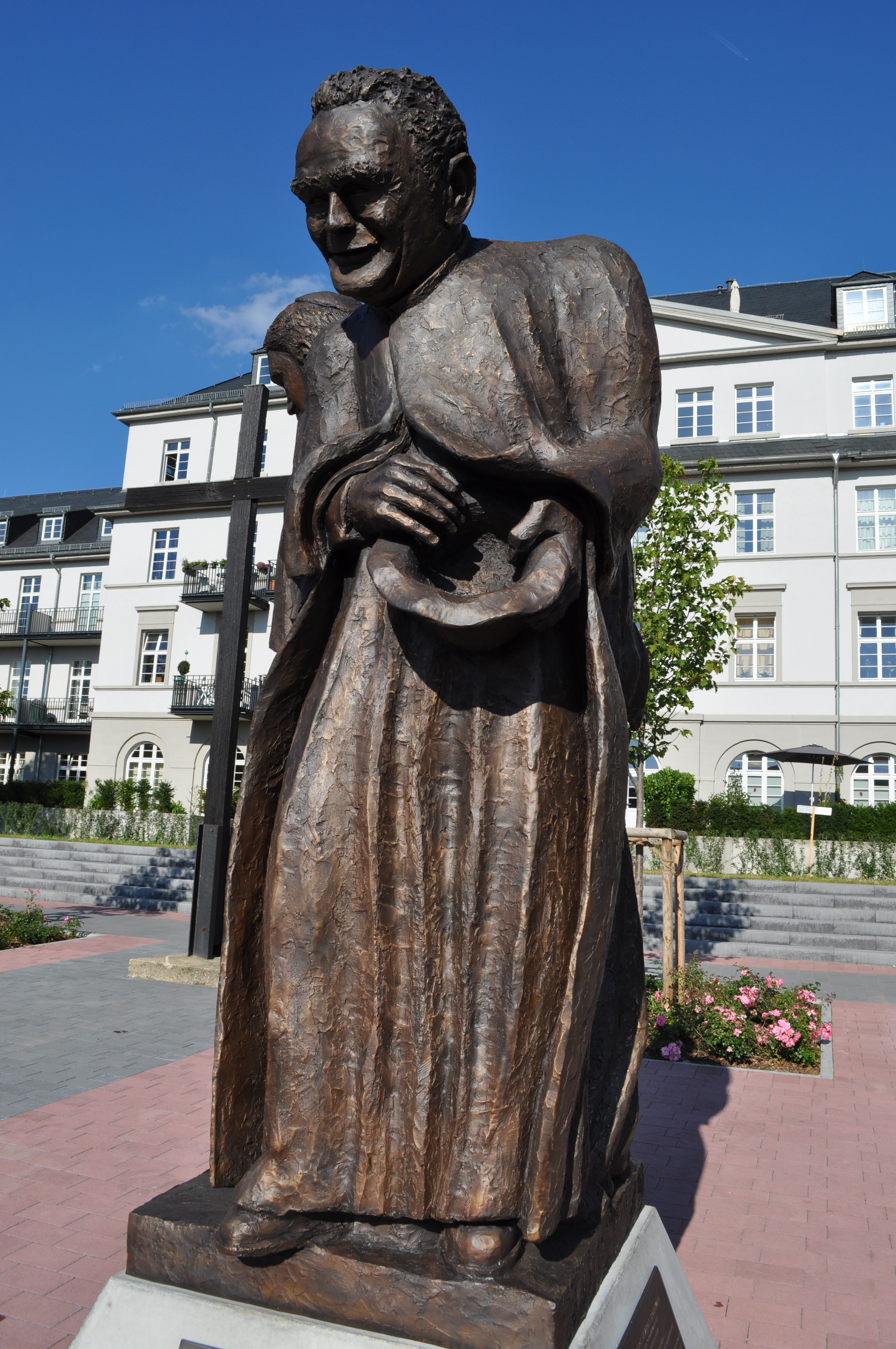
Father Werenfried van Straaten, one of the three "Königsteiner Kirchenväter" (Church Fathers from Königstein), a statue by Christoph Loch

Werenfried van Straaten, born Philippus Johannes Hendricus van Straaten O. Praem. (17 January 1913 – 31 January 2003), was a Dutch Catholic priest and social activist. He was a Premonstratensian priest expatriate in Germany, who became known for his charitable work across the world. He was the founder of the Catholic charity "Aid to the Church in Need".

== History ==
Born in Mijdrecht, Netherlands, he originally intended to become a teacher and enrolled at the University of Utrecht in 1932, to study Classical Philology. There he was also editor in a student newspaper and co-founder of a political party, which had only a short existence. He decided instead to follow a religious life and in 1934 entered the Premonstratensian Tongerlo Abbey, of the Norbertine Order, in the province of Antwerp, in Belgium, taking the religious name "Werenfried", in honour of an early Medieval Germanic saint. He became the abbot's secretary, after a bout of tuberculosis that left him too weak for missionary work. He was ordained a priest on 25 July 1940.

== Charitable work ==
He first rose to public attention at Christmas, 1947, when he wrote an article entitled "Peace on Earth? No Room at the Inn", in which he appealed to all faithful to help the fourteen million German civilians displaced from the east at the end of World War II, six million of whom were Roman Catholics. These refugees and expellees resided in very primitive camps, mostly former Nazi concentration camps or Allied POW camps located in the western occupation zones of Germany and – for a minority – in the Netherlands and Belgium, and suffered from malnutrition and lack of medical care.

The response to the article of Van Straaten was unexpectedly generous, proving charity still existed and hatred was lessening towards the former enemies. He earned his nickname, "Bacon Priest" (Dutch: Spekpater) due to his appeals to Flemish farmers for contributions of food for the German refugees, appeals which met with considerable amounts of meat being donated. His next concern was the pastoral care of the six million displaced Catholics, some of which were housed in purely Protestant areas, without their own churches and pastors. With the action "A vehicle for God", he converted used buses and trucks into mobile altars. In 1953, van Straaten called the International Building Order into being, to motivate students to help refugees and displaced persons build their own homes in Germany.

This initial work led to the formation of Aid to the Church in Need (Kirche in Not), centered in Königstein, West Germany, in 1952. After 1950, he was active in Catholic relief work worldwide, through church appeals, public speaking and his newsletter, The Mirror, which he began publishing in 1953. After the plight of the expellees in the newly-founded Federal Republic of Germany was largely alleviated, his concern became the persecuted Church in the now communist-dominated Eastern Europe. He was a fierce anti-communist activist. After the collapse of the Soviet regime, he tried to bridge the trenches to the Catholic Church, through generous help to the Russian Orthodox Church.

Werenfried van Straaten succeeded in combining charitable engagement with dedication to the proclamation of the faith. For his life's work, he was honored many times by the Church and the State. He also wrote a number of books, including They Call Me The Bacon Priest (1960).

In his later years, he was active in anti-abortion activism, demonstrating and speaking out against abortion in Western Europe and the United States.

He died on 31 January 2003 at Bad Soden in Germany, at the age of 90 years. He is buried in the cemetery of Königstein im Taunus.

== Werenfried Prize ==
At the 3^{rd} International Congress of Treffpunkt Weltkirche, held from 11 to 13 April 2008, in Augsburg, the Father Werenfried Prize was awarded for the first time to the Friends of the St. Clemens Church from Berlin. This prize, endowed with 1,000 euros, was awarded jointly with the Katholische Sonntagszeitung. At the 5^{th} international congress of Treffpunkt Weltkirche, held from 12 to 15 March 2015, in Würzburg, the Father Werenfried Prize was awarded to Gabriele Kuby.

== Sexual Assault Allegation ==
In 2021, Die Zeit published an article which made known the existence of a letter from 2010 indicating that Van Straaten was accused of committing sexual assault in 1973 against a 20-year-old woman working for the charity. In a statement consisting of questions and answers, Aid to the Church in Need responded to the disclosure and noted that "ACN deeply regrets the serious allegations and condemns any kind of behavior of which Father van Straaten has been accused in the article."

== Books ==
- They Call Me The Bacon Priest, New City Press, Belgium, 1965.
- Where God Weeps, Ignatius Press, San Francisco, 1989.
