= Roman Catechism =

Catechism published in 1566

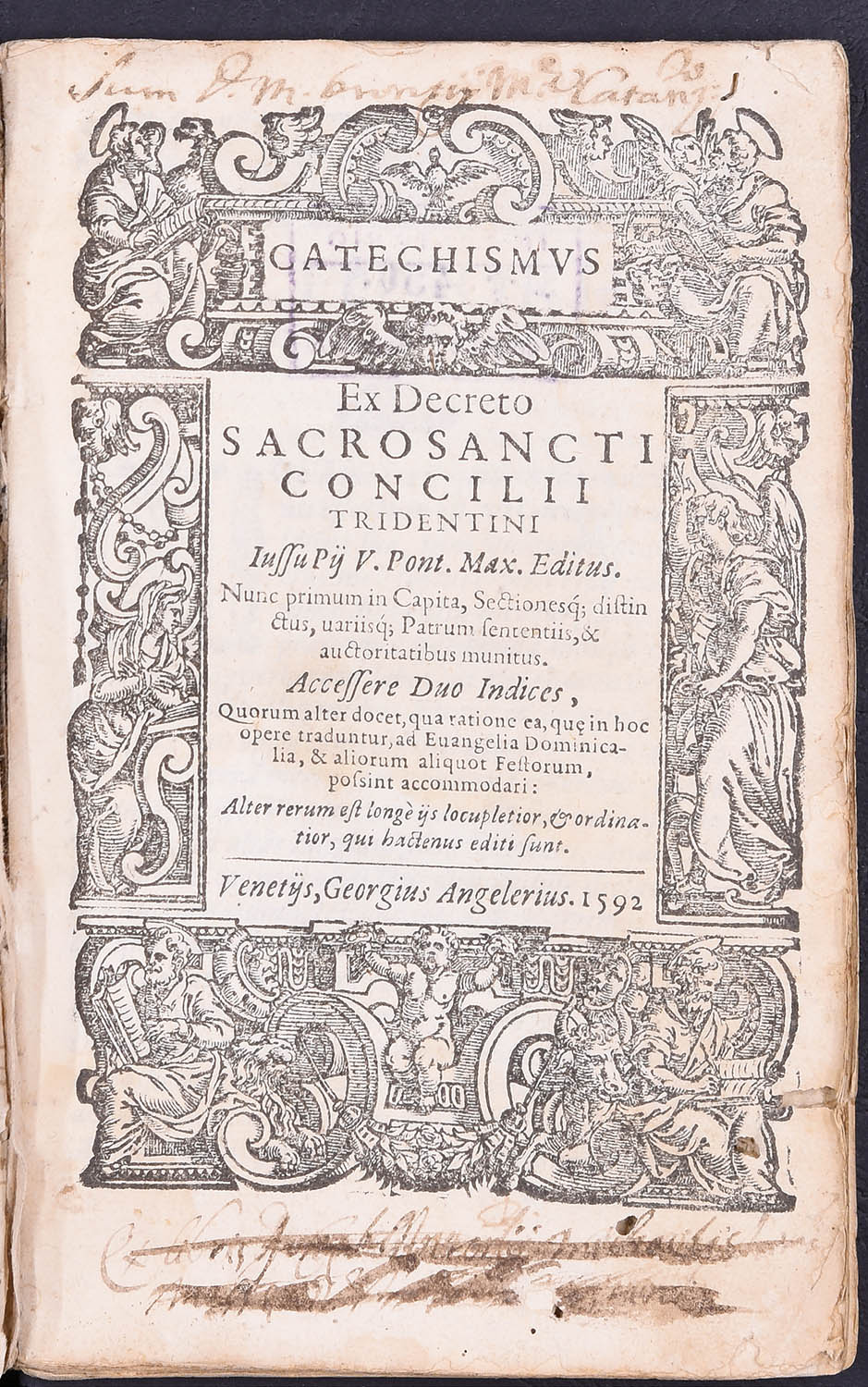
Title page of a 1592 edition of the Roman Catechism

The Roman Catechism, Catechism of the Council of Trent, or Tridentine Catechism, is a compendium of Catholic doctrine commissioned during the Counter-Reformation by the Council of Trent, to expound doctrine and to improve the theological understanding of the clergy. It was published in 1566.

It differs from other summaries of Christian doctrine for the instruction of the people in that it is primarily intended for priests having care of souls. The need of a popular authoritative manual arose from a lack of systematic knowledge among pre-Reformation clergy and the concomitant neglect of religious instruction among the Catholic laity.

== History ==
During the Protestant Reformation, the popular tracts and catechisms of Martin Luther, John Calvin and other Reformers were sold in areas controlled by Protestant monarchs, who determined the faith in their region (see: Cuius regio, eius religio). Catholic Catechisms, published by individuals existed as well. The Jesuit Petrus Canisius had published such a Catechism in 1555 in both German and Latin. The Council of Trent commissioned the first Church-wide Roman Catholic catechism. This catechism was directed to clergy. It included large parts of the Canisius catechisms, including his addition to the Hail Mary: Holy Mary, Mother of God, pray for us sinners.

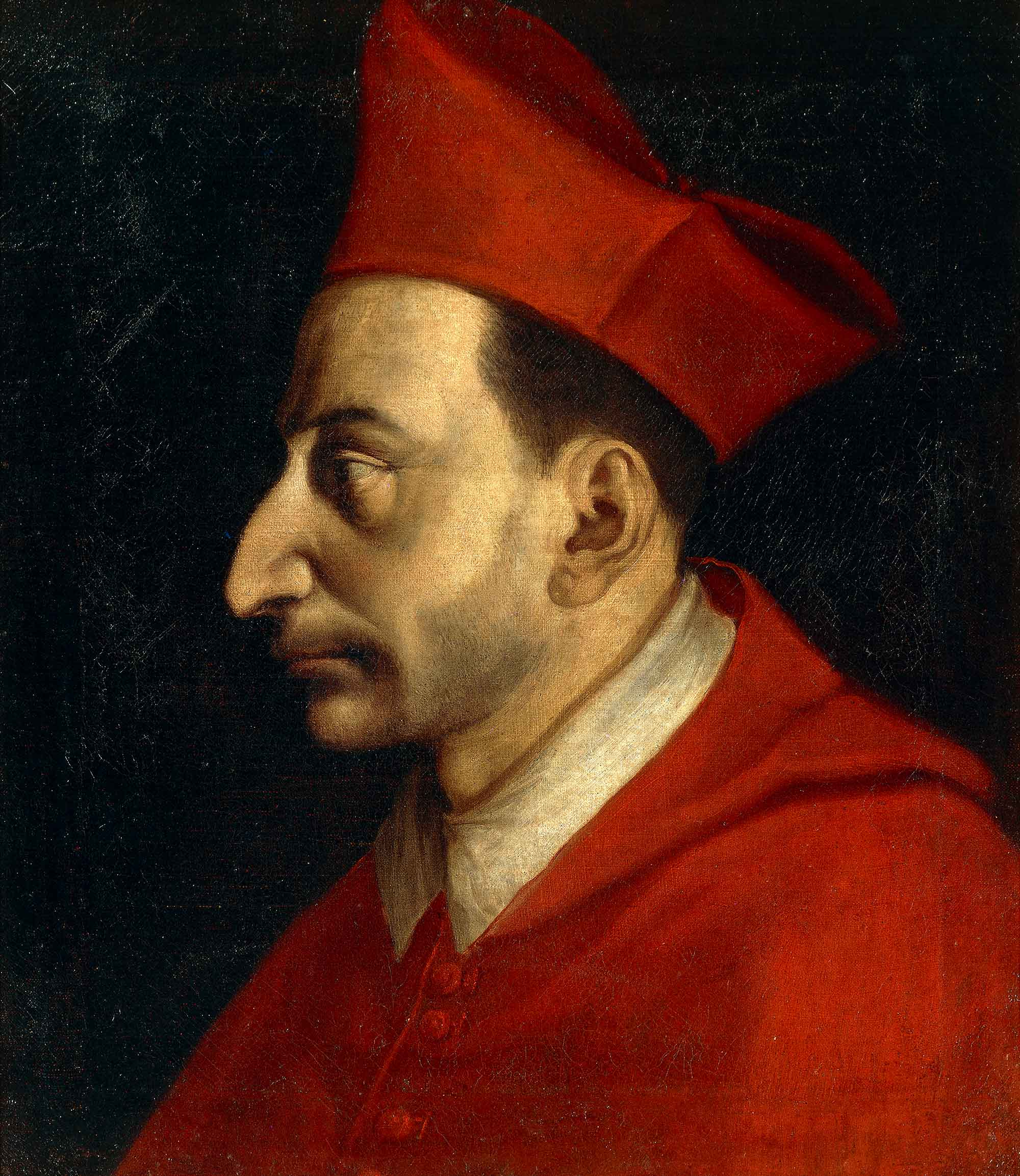
Milan's Archbishop Charles Borromeo (1538–1584), later canonized as a saint, suggested the Roman Catechism.

The Fathers of the council said they wished "to apply a salutary remedy to this great and pernicious evil, and thinking that the definition of the principal Catholic doctrines was not enough for the purpose, resolved also to publish a formulary and method for teaching the rudiments of the faith, to be used by all legitimate pastors and teachers" (Cat. praef., vii). This resolution was taken in the sixteenth session (26 February 1562) on the suggestion of Charles Borromeo; who was then giving full scope to his zeal for the reformation of the clergy. Pius IV entrusted the composition of the Catechism to four distinguished theologians:

- Leonardo Marini, Archbishop of Lanciano;
- Muzio Calini, Archbishop of Zara;
- Egidio Foscarari, Bishop of Modena; and
- Francisco Foreiro, a Portuguese Dominican.

Three cardinals were appointed to supervise the work. Charles Borromeo superintended the redaction of the original Italian text, which was finished in 1564. Cardinal William Sirletus then gave it the final touches, and the famous Humanists, Julius Pogianus and Paulus Manutius, translated it into classical Latin. It was then published in Latin and Italian as "Catechismus ex decreto Concilii Tridentini ad parochos Pii V jussu editus, Romae, 1566" (in-folio). Translations into the vernacular of every nation were ordered by the Council (Sess. XXIV, "De Ref.", c. vii).

== Content and authority ==
The Council intended the projected Catechism to be the Church's official manual of popular instruction. The seventh canon, "De Reformatione", of Sess. XXIV, runs:

That the faithful may approach the Sacraments with greater reverence and devotion, the Holy Synod charges all the bishops about to administer them to explain their operation and use in a way adapted to the understanding of the people; to see, moreover, that their parish priests observe the same rule piously and prudently, making use for their explanations, where necessary and convenient, of the vernacular tongue; and conforming to the form to be prescribed by the Holy Synod in its instructions (catechesis) for the several Sacraments: the bishops shall have these instructions carefully translated into the vulgar tongue and explained by all parish priests to their flocks ...

Although primarily written for the parish priests, the Catechism was also intended to give a fixed and stable scheme of instruction to the Catholic laity, especially with regard to the means of grace. To attain this object the work closely follows the dogmatic definitions of the Council. It is divided into four parts:

1. The Apostles' Creed;
2. The Sacraments;
3. The Decalogue;
4. Prayer, especially The Lord's Prayer.

It deals with the papal primacy, a point which was not defined at Trent; on the other hand, it is silent on the doctrine of indulgences, which is set forth in the "Decretum de indulgentiis", Sess. XXV. It states the common doctrine about servitude, allowed in some cases (prisoners of war, self-selling in extreme necessity, civil punishment): "To enslave a freeman, or appropriate the slave of another is called man-stealing".

The bishops urged in every way the use of the new Catechism; they enjoined its frequent reading, so that all its contents would be committed to memory; they exhorted the priests to discuss parts of it at their meetings, and insisted upon its being used for instructing the people.

To some editions of the Roman Catechism a "Praxis Catechismi", i.e. a division of its contents into sermons for every Sunday of the year adapted to the Gospel of the day, was prefixed.

The Catechism does not have the authority of conciliary definitions or other primary symbols of faith; for, although decreed by the Council, it was only published a year after the members had dispersed, and it consequently lacks a formal conciliary approbation. During the heated controversies de auxiliis gratiae between the Thomists and Molinists, the Jesuits refused to accept the authority of the Catechism as decisive. Yet it possesses high authority as an exposition of Catholic doctrine. It was composed by order of a council, issued and approved by the pope; its use has been prescribed by numerous synods throughout the whole Catholic Church; Pope Leo XIII, in a letter to the French bishops of 8 September 1899, recommended the study of the Roman Catechism to all seminarians, and Pope Pius X signified his desire that preachers should expound it to their congregations.

== Editions and translations ==
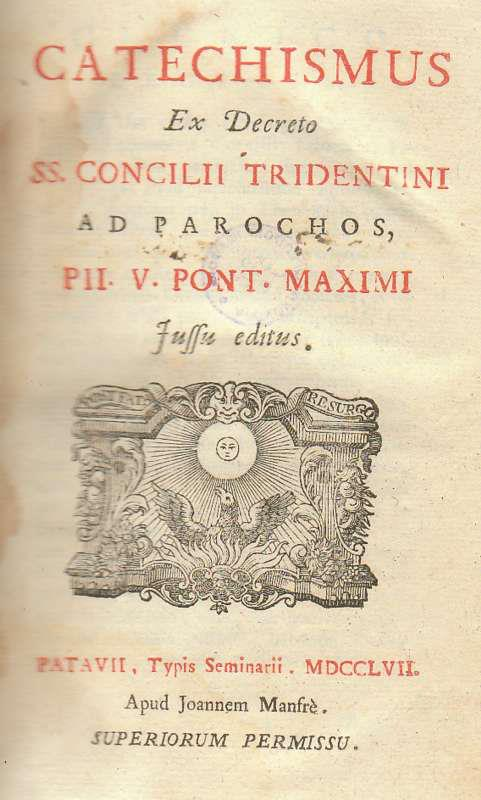
An edition issued in 1757

The earliest editions of the Roman Catechism are "Romae apud Paulum Manutium", 1566; "Venetiis, apud Dominicum de Farrisö", 1567; "Coloniae", 1567 (by Henricus Aquensis); "Parisuis, in aedibus. Jac. Kerver", 1568; "Venetiis, apud Aldum", 1575; and Ingolstadt, 1577 (Sartorius). In 1596 appeared at Antwerp the "Cat. Romanus ... quaestionibus distinctus, brevibusque exhortatiunculis studio Andreae Fabricii, Leodiensis" ('distinguished by questions and brief exhortations, through the efforts of Andreas Fabricius of Liège'). This editor, A. Le Fevre, died in 1581. He probably made this division of the Roman Catechism into questions and answers in 1570.

A critical edition was published in 1989.

George Eder, in 1569, arranged the Catechism for the use of schools. He distributed the main doctrines into sections and subsections and added perspicuous tables of contents. This work bears the title: "Methodus Catechismi Catholici".

The next English translation is by Jeremy Donovan, a professor at Maynooth, published by Richard Coyne, Capel Street, Dublin, and by Keating & Brown, London, and printed for the translator by W. Folds & Son, Great Shand Street, 1829. An American edition appeared in the same year. Donovan's translation was reprinted at Rome by the Propaganda Press, in two volumes in 1839; it is dedicated to Cardinal Fransoni and signed "Jeremias Donovan, sacerdos hibernus, cubicularius Gregorii XVI, P. M." There is another English translation by T. A. Buckley of Christ Church, Oxford (London, 1852), which is more elegant than Donovan's and has notes and glosses giving historical and doctrinal background information. The first German translation, by Paul Hoffaeus, is dated Dillingen, 1568.

Charles J. Callan and John A. McHugh published a new English translation in 1923. Some reviewers praised the translation as "well done" and "clear and elegant", and also praised Callan and McHugh's new division of the text into sections and their addition of footnotes referring to sources such as St. Thomas, St. Alphonsus, and the Code of Canon Law. Another reviewer praised the book's clear printing, but suggested that the section divisions made by the translators were not always fitting and faulted the translation for "defects and mistakes which make us regret that sufficient care was not given to produce a definitive English translation of this great and important work".
