= Luther's Catechism =

Luther's Catechism may refer to:

- Luther's Large Catechism, consisting of works written by Martin Luther and compiled Christian canonical texts, published in April 1529
- Luther's Small Catechism, also published in 1529 but for training children
