= Piet Schoonenberg =

Dutch Jesuit priest, theologian and professor of theology (1911–1999)

Piet Schoonenberg, SJ (1 October 1911 – 21 September 1999) was a Dutch Jesuit priest, theologian and professor of theology. Closely associated with the nouvelle théologie movement, he is best known for his major contributions to the Dutch Catechism of 1966.

== Biography ==
Born in Amsterdam on 1 October 1911, Schoonenberg was 19 years old when, on 7 September 1930, he entered the Jesuit novitiate of Mariëndaal in Velp, Netherlands. He went on to study theology and philosophy in Nijmegen (at the Berchmanianum), in Maastricht, and in Rome (at the Pontifical Biblical Institute). He was ordained as a priest on 15 August 1939.

Schoonenberg obtained a doctorate in theology in 1948, with a dissertation on "Theology as an Articulation of Faith" (Theologie als geloofsverkondiging), which discussed the contemporary French theological literature known as nouvelle théologie. After several years teaching theology in Maastricht and Amsterdam, Schoonenberg returned to Nijmegen in 1957, where he became associated with the Higher Catechetical Institute. In 1964, he became ordinary professor of dogmatic theology at the Catholic University of Nijmegen, a post which he retained until his retirement in 1976. He died in Nijmegen on 21 September 1999.

Schoonenberg was a prolific author, and achieved international renown within his own lifetime, with many of his works being translated into English and other languages. He is particularly noted for his contributions to a new Catholic theology of original sin, Christology, and Trinitarian dogma. With the Nijmegen Higher Catechetical Institute, Schoonenberg was also heavily involved in the drafting of the Dutch Catechism, published in 1966, a controversial work which provoked extensive debate within the Catholic Church.

== Theological views ==
- Original sin: For Schoonenberg – in Man and Sin – original sin is not so much the consequence of a single act of disobedience by Adam and Eve which deprived all succeeding generations of divine grace, but rather is the "sin of the world": a negative situation and atmosphere caused by the accumulation of human sins. Any human being placed in this situation from birth is negatively influenced in the exercise of his personal freedom, with the result that he cannot refrain from sinning.
- Christology: An article in 1966 (published with Edward Schillebeeckx), taken up and developed in Schoonenberg's book Hij is een God van mensen, aroused controversy. Reacting against the excessive deification of Jesus, Schoonenberg developed a Christology "from below", taking the humanity of Christ as his starting point. In opposition to the orthodox view of Christ as one person possessing two natures, both fully divine and fully human, Schoonenberg spoke of Jesus primarily as a human being in whom God was present. Faced with the controversy that this aroused, the Congregation for the Doctrine of the Faith found it necessary to defend the traditional doctrine in its 1972 declaration Mysterium Filii Dei.
- Trinity: In his writings on Trinitarian theology, Schoonenberg argued that mankind's experience of God in the economy of salvation cannot be extrapolated into a theory about the immanent Trinity, the eternal triune existence of God. The true and eternal nature of God is unknowable and irrelevant. Strongly criticized, he later qualified his Trinitarian conception. His proposal nonetheless contributed to new theological debates on the relationship between the so-called "economic Trinity" and "immanent Trinity".

== Works ==
Works available in English translation include:

- God's World in the Making, Duquesne University Press, 1964
- Man and Sin: A Theological View, Sheed and Ward, 1965 (translation of De macht der zonde, 1962)
- Covenant and Creation, Sheed and Ward, 1968 (translation of Het geloof van ons doopsel, 1955–58)
- The Christ: A Study of the God-Man Relationship in the Whole of Creation and in Jesus Christ, Herder and Herder, 1971 (translation of Hij is een God van mensen, 1966)

Other Dutch-language works include:

- "Theology als geloofsvertolking" ["Theology as an Articulation of Faith"], 1948 dissertation
- De geest, het woord en de zoon [The Spirit, the Word and the Son], 1991
- De Christus "van boven" en de christologie "van beneden" [The Christ "From Above" and the Christology "From Below"], 1992
