= Leonardo Marini =

Italian theologian and archbishop

Leonardo Marini (1509 in Chios – 11 June 1573 in Rome) was an Italian theologian and archbishop of the Dominican Order of the Catholic Church.

== Biography ==
Marini was born on the island of Chios, in the Aegean Sea, to a noble Genoese family. He entered the Dominican Order and studied theology.

Marini failed to be bishop of Perugia when Pope Paul III died before he could elect him, but his successor, Pope Julius III, appointed him the administrator of the Diocese of Mantua and bishop of the Diocese of Laodicensis in Phrygia (5 March 1550).

Marini also served as papal diplomat to Emperor Charles V and Philip II of Spain, and in 1560 Pope Pius IV appointed him Bishop of Lanciano (and archbishop in 1562). He was papal legate to the Council of Trent. After being transferred to Alba Pompeia (1566), appointed apostolic visitor to twenty-five dioceses of Italy.

Marini collaborated on the formation of the Roman Catechism and was a member of the Roman Breviary reform commission (1568) and of the Roman Missal (1570). On behalf of Pius IV, he reviewed the rules and constitutions of the Clerics Regular of St. Paul (Barnabites).
