= Comacchio (disambiguation) =

Comacchio is a town and comune of Emilia Romagna, Italy.

Comacchio may also refer to:

- Comacchio Cathedral, in the city of Comacchio
- Valli di Comacchio, a series of lagoons to the south of Comacchio
- US Comacchio Lidi, an Italian association football club in Comacchio
- Santo Rosario, Comacchio, a church in Comacchio
- Santa Maria in Aula Regia, Comacchio, a church in Comacchio
- Battle of Comacchio, 809 naval battle
- Comacchio War, (1708–1709)
- Roman Catholic Archdiocese of Ferrara-Comacchio
  - Roman Catholic Diocese of Comacchio
- A frazione in Cuvio, a town and comune of Lombardy, Italy.
