= Trinity Bridge, Crowland =

Three-way bridge in Crowland, Lincolnshire, England

Trinity Bridge
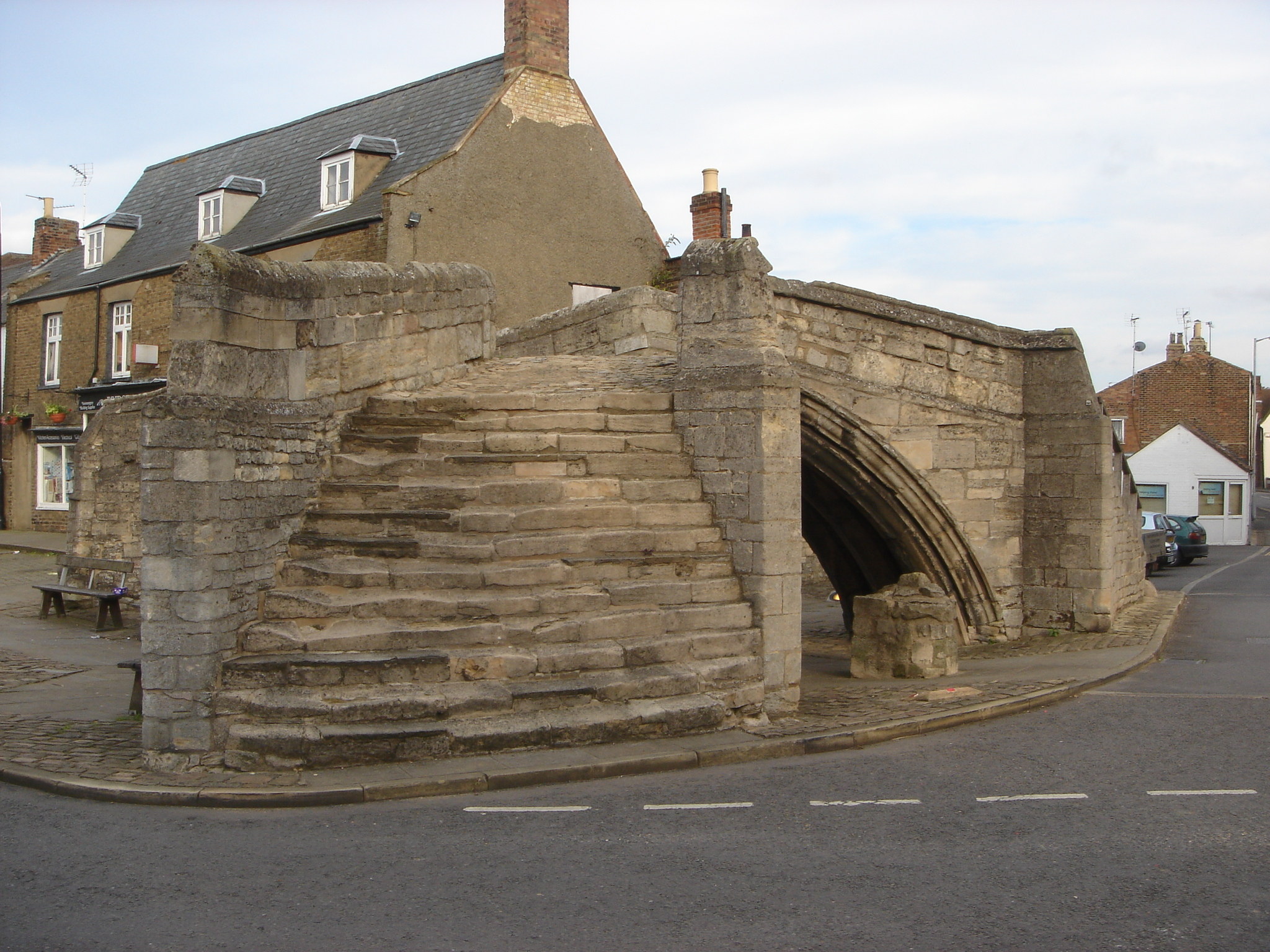
- The triangular Trinity Bridge stands on dry land
- Coordinates: 52.6757°N 0.168281°W
- OS grid reference: TF 23939 10237
- Carries: pedestrians
- Crosses: formerly the River Welland and a tributary
- Locale: Crowland, Lincolnshire, England
- Heritage status: Grade I listed

Characteristics
- Design: three-way arch bridge
- Material: Stone
- No. of spans: depends how you count them
- Piers in water: 0

History
- Construction start: 1360
- Construction end: 1390

Location
- Interactive map of Trinity Bridge

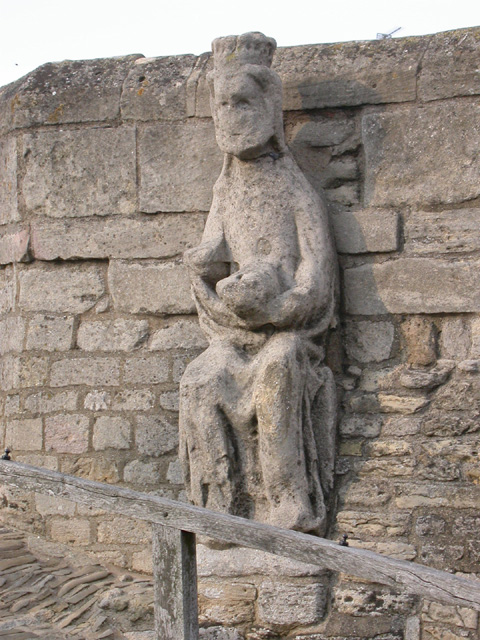
The statue on Trinity Bridge is thought to be that of Christ or of King Æthelbald and is possibly from the west front of the Croyland Abbey.

Trinity Bridge or the Triangular Bridge is a unique three-way stone arch bridge that stands at the heart of Crowland, Lincolnshire, England. While it once spanned the divergence of the River Welland and a distributary, the rivers have been re-routed, and it now spans nothing significant.

At Crowland the Welland used to split into two channels, one broadly following the present course of the river, and the other joining the Old South Eau to reach the River Nene near Wisbech. The river no longer flows through Crowland, but the triangular bridge, which spanned the junction, remains in the centre of the town.

== History ==
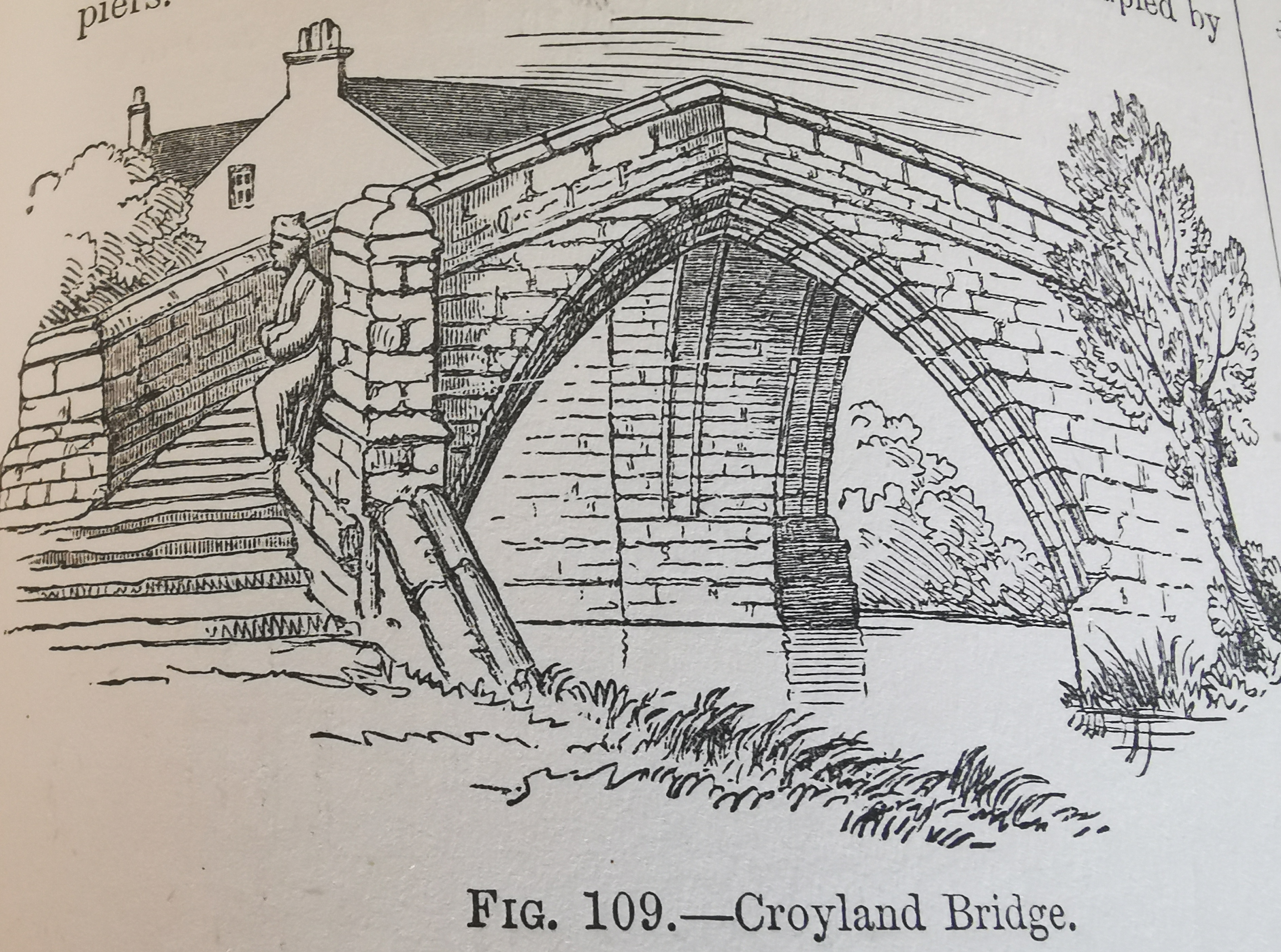
1876 illustration showing the rivers flowing beneath the bridge and the approaches on the bank

The current bridge dates to the 14th century (built between 1360 and 1390) and replaced previous wooden bridges. The earliest known mention of the bridge is by King Æthelbald of Mercia in 716. It was mentioned in a (spurious) 943 charter of Eadred. The bridge is now a scheduled monument and Grade I listed.

The bridge is predominantly built from Barnack stone, which was quarried at Barnack about 10 miles (16 km) to the west of Crowland, and presumably transported by boat on the Welland.

This bridge has three stairways that converge at the top. Originally it spanned the River Welland and a distributary that flowed through the town, although the rivers were re-routed in the mid-17th century and no longer flow anywhere near the bridge. The bridge was an unusual and economical solution to the crossing of two watercourses at their divergence, reducing the need for three separate bridges to a single structure with three abutments.

It was described in 1876, as "stand(ing) at the confluence of the Welland, the Nyne and the Catwater drain, (it has) three pointed arches, having their abutments at the angles of an equilateral triangle, (which) meet in the middle, giving three watercourses and three roadways. Each arch has three stone ribs, and the nine meet in the centre."

In 1952 a watercolour of Trinity Bridge by F. W. Baldwin was used on a menu for the P&O liner RMS Strathmore. A copy can be found in the Victoria and Albert Museum in London under reference number E.346-2005.

== See also ==
- Dry Bridge in Zrenjanin, Serbia, is another example of a bridge no longer crossing water, but it is far larger
- Ponte dei Trepponti in Comacchio, Italy
