= Dry Bridge =

Dry Bridge Мост на сувом, Суви мост
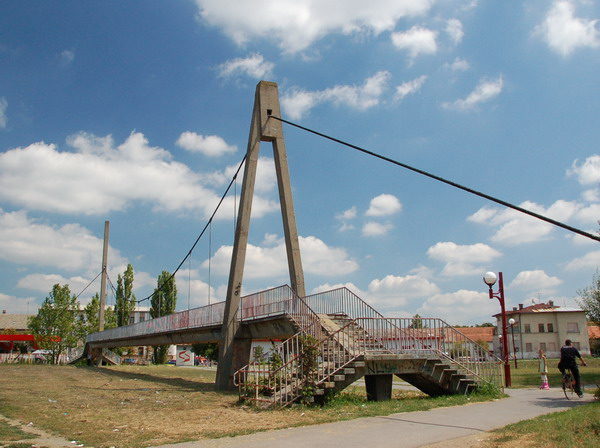
- Coordinates: 45°22′54″N 20°23′3″E
- Carries: Pedestrians
- Locale: Zrenjanin, Vojvodina, Serbia

Characteristics
- Material: Concrete
- No. of spans: 1
- Piers in water: 0

History
- Designer: Rada Janjatov
- Construction end: 1962
- Opened: July 7, 1962
- Closed: 1985

Dry Bridge (Serbian: Мост на сувом, Суви мост) is a bridge in Zrenjanin, Serbia. It currently does not span any physical obstacle, since the flow of the river under it was diverted.

== History ==
The bridge was built in 1962 by project engineer Rada Janjatov, as a suspension bridge. Its purpose was to connect Zrenjanin city center with Mala Amerika quarter. Two holding towers, one on the north side and the other on the south side, are made of steel and concrete. The northern tower is a 23-meter-high pylon, while the southern tower is A-shaped and 16 meters high. The suspension cable is made of 102 steel wires.

In 1985, city authorities decided to fill in the secondary bed of the Begej river. A dike between two lakes of the former Begej bed was built at the bridge site, and 23 years after being built, Dry Bridge lost its purpose.

As of 2015 the bridge still stands, although rusty and in bad condition. The city authorities plan to demolish the bridge since it does not have any purpose and is unsafe. Some residents claim that Dry Bridge has become an ironic symbol of Zrenjanin, and should not be demolished, on the basis that it is one of only a few bridges in the world that does not span any kind of physical obstacle; Trinity Bridge in Crowland, England, is another smaller, older example.
