= Cesare Mezzogori =

Italian painter

Cesare Mezzogori (Active 1660s-1689) was an Italian painter, active in a Baroque style.

He was born in Comacchio, and likely trained as well as active in Ferrara. He often painted for the Theatine order. He painted a Virgin of the Rosary with the Saints Domenico and Giustina for the Church of Santa Maria del Rosario in Comacchio.
