= Perigon =

Perigon can refer to

- In mathematics, an angle of 360° (see Angle § Individual angles)
- Périgon, a town in the fictional province of Averoigne in the writings of Clark Ashton Smith

== See also ==
- Perigone (disambiguation)
