= Santo Rosario =

Santo Rosario may refer to:

- Santo Rosario, Bohol, a village in the Philippines
- Santo Rosario de Pasig Church, a church in Pasig, Philippines
- Santo Rosario, Comacchio, a church in Comacchio, Ferrara, Emilia-Romagna, Italy

== See also ==
- Rosario (disambiguation)
