= Sukošan =

Village and municipality in Zadar County, Croatia

- Village
- Interactive map of Sukošan
- Location of Sukošan in Croatia
- Coordinates: 44.049°N 15.312°E
- Country: Croatia
- Region: Dalmatia
- County: Zadar County

Area
  - Village: 55.3 km^{2} (21.4 sq mi)
  - Urban: 19.9 km^{2} (7.7 sq mi)

Population (2021)
  - Village: 4,665
  - Density: 84.4/km^{2} (218/sq mi)
  - Urban: 2,980
  - Urban density: 150/km^{2} (388/sq mi)
- Website: opcina-sukosan.hr

Sukošan is a village and a municipality in Zadar County, Croatia. It is located between the cities of Zadar and Biograd na Moru.

== Geography ==
Sukošan is a holiday resort, with a long coastline, numerous coves and clear sea.

Situated in a bay, Sukošan has a few sand beaches. The village is known for its traditional narrow alleys.

As a nautical center, Sukošan is a site of Zlatna luka Marina, the Tustica Nature Complex, pebble beaches, camping sites, distinguished buildings, olive groves, and vineyards.

== History ==
The parish church of St. Kasijan, erected probably in the eleventh century (fragments with pleter motifs - interlacery ornamentation), assumed its present aspect in the seventeenth century. It tends to be open for special occasions, such as August thirteenth, the feast of St Kasijan.

A small church from the seventeenth century rises on the graveyard. Fragments with "pleter" (interlacery ornaments) are incorporated in its door-posts and on the front.

The ruins of the fifteenth-century summer villa of the archbishops of Zadar can be seen on an islet in the bay. The earth utilized to form the base of the villa was dredged from the neighborhood Punta, forming a festering tidal pool, known as Lake Sukošan, or Sukošan Jezero.

The ruins of the mediaeval fortress erected by the counts of Bribir rise on Cape Bribircina.

== Demographics ==
Historical population
Year	Pop.	±%
1857	1,190	—
1869	1,342	+12.8%
1880	1,491	+11.1%
1890	1,795	+20.4%
1900	2,048	+14.1%
1910	2,167	+5.8%
1921	2,568	+18.5%
1931	2,690	+4.8%
1948	3,069	+14.1%
1953	3,314	+8.0%
1961	3,825	+15.4%
1971	3,839	+0.4%
1981	3,894	+1.4%
1991	4,363	+12.0%
2001	4,402	+0.9%
2011	4,583	+4.1%
2021	4,665	+1.8%
Source: DZS

In 2021, the municipality had 4,665 residents in the following 4 settlements:

- Debeljak, population 895
- Glavica, population 178
- Gorica, population 612
- Sukošan, population 2980
Sukošan: Population trends 1857–2021
v

population	1190	1342	1491	1795	2048	2167	2568	2690	3069	3314	3825	3839	3894	4363	4402	4583	4665
	1857	1869	1880	1890	1900	1910	1921	1931	1948	1953	1961	1971	1981	1991	2001	2011	2021

Sources: Croatian Bureau of Statistics publications

The majority of the population are Croats.

== Culture ==
Sukošan cherishes the old customs. They are linked to the feast of St. Kasijan, the patron saint of Sukosan (13 August). The Nights of Sukosan is another event offering entertainment. During the carnival season, "luzari", masques typical only of Sukosan, represent a special attraction.

Due to its numerous restaurants and taverns, Sukošan is known as a place of drinking wine and singing.

== Economy ==
Chief occupations include farming, viniculture, olive growing, fruit growing and tourism.
