= Perigune =

Greek mythological figure

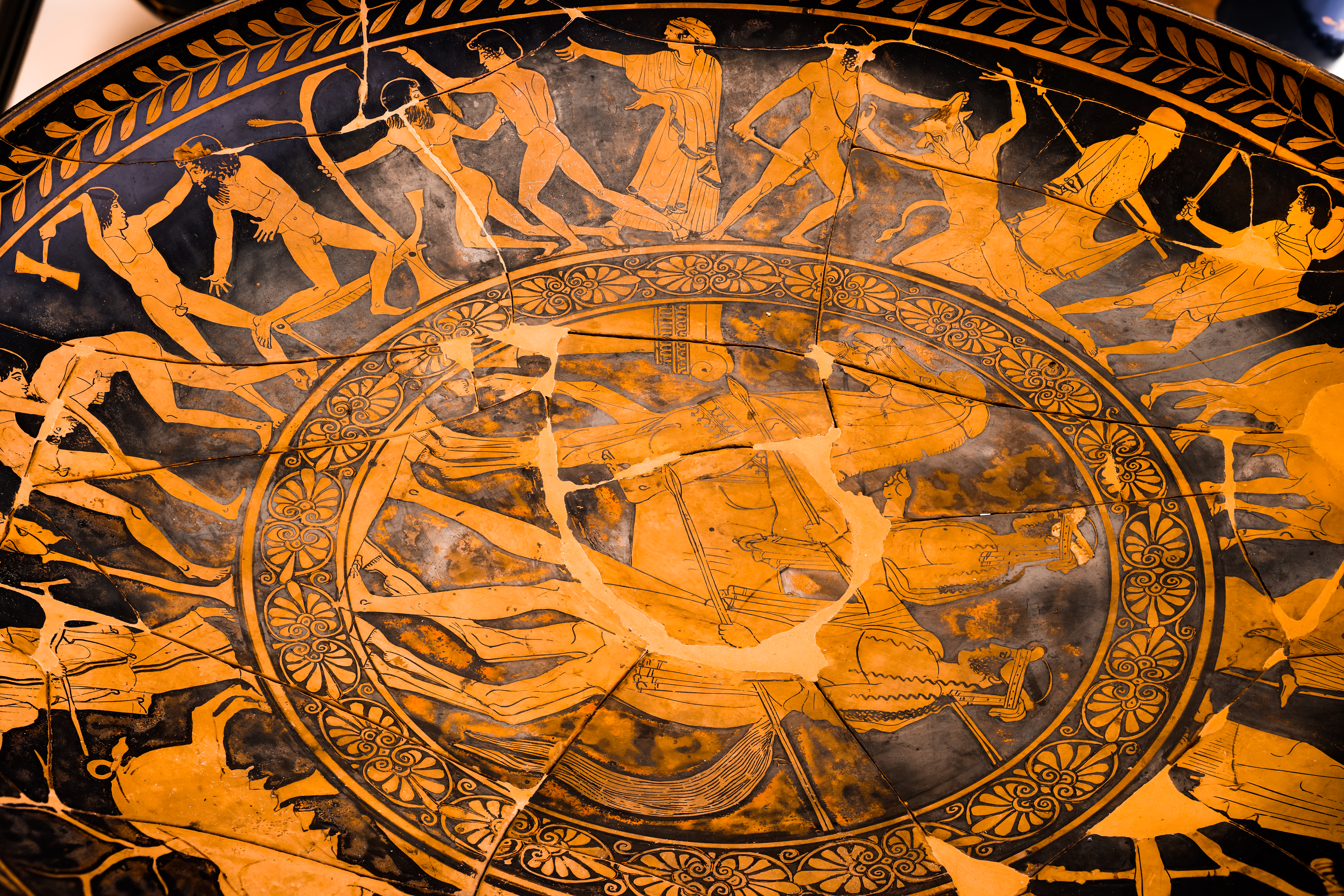
A red-figure kylix depicting the exploits of Theseus; Perigune is possibly the woman running away from Theseus as he fights Sinis. National Archaeological Museum of Ferrara, Italy. c. 460–450 BCE.

In Greek mythology, Perigune (Ancient Greek: Περιγούνη, romanized: Perigoúnē) was the daughter of Sinis, the bandit killed by the Athenian hero Theseus. Afterwards she bore Melanippus to Theseus. Her name is also spelled Perigoune, Perigouna or Perigone.

== Mythology ==
Perigune is mentioned in only a few sources and the details are sparse. The only real surviving account comes from Plutarch in the Parallel Lives. who states that, after Theseus killed her father, she hid herself in a bed of rushes and wild asparagus, supplicating the plants to hide her as if they could hear her, and promising that if they hid her she would not burn them down or trample them. When Theseus promised not to harm her, she emerged from hiding. She then bore Melanippus to Theseus, who became the ancestor of the Ioxides of Caria. These people, Plutarch states, revered the asparagus and the rush and did not burn them. Afterwards Theseus gave her to Deioneus of Oechalia.

David H. J. Larmour suggests that the particular details of Perigune's 'touching and pathetic' behaviour and Theseus' subsequent abandonment of her and designed by Plutarch to give the reader a negative impression of Theseus' treatment of women – a trait for which Plutarch later criticises him.

Pausanias also mentions that Theseus fathered Melanippus with the daughter of Sinis, but gives no further details. In the Deipnosophistae of Athenaeus she – again referred to only as the daughter of Sinis – is listed as one of the women taken by Theseus. Athenaeus cites the fourteenth book of Istrus's Attika as the source of the information.

== In art ==
There are no known certain depictions of her in ancient art. She is possibly represented on the interior of a kylix by the Penthesilea Painter in the collection of the National Archaeological Museum of Ferrara. The cup depicts various scenes from the exploits of Theseus, including that with Sinis. The relevant scene shows Theseus grabbing the top of a tree with his left hand and Sinis with his right. To their right is a running woman who Jenifer Neils suggests could be Perigune.

== Reception ==
She is mentioned as Perigenia in Shakespeare's A Midsummer Night's Dream in an exchange between Oberon and Titania in which Oberon accuses Titania of leading Theseus astray and making him abandon the various women he had ravished.

== Bibliography ==
- Athenaeus (1854). The Deipnosophists. Translated by Yonge, C. D. Henry G. Bohn.
- Gantz, Timothy (1993). Early Greek myth: a guide to literary and artistic sources. Johns Hopkins University press. ISBN 0-8018-4410-X.
- Larmour, David H. J. (1988). "Plutarch's Compositional Methods in the Theseus and Romulus". Transactions of the American Philological Association. 118: 361–375. doi:10.2307/284177. ISSN 0360-5949.
- Neils, Jenifer (1994). "Theseus". Lexicon Iconographicum Mythologiae Classicae (LIMC). Vol. 7: Oidipous - Theseus. Artemis & Winkler Verlag. pp. 922–951.
- Pausanias (1918). Description of Greece. Vol. 4. Translated by Jones, W.H.S. Harvard University Press.
- Plutarch (1914). Parallel Lives. Vol. 1. Translated by Perrin, Bernadotte. Harvard University Press.
- Shakespeare, William (1842). The Works of Shakespeare. Vol. 2. Whittaker & Co.
