= Battle of Comacchio =

Coordinates: 44.6838°N 12.1703°E

Date	809
Location	Comacchio, Italy
Result	Frankish victory

Belligerents
Carolingian Empire	Byzantine Empire

Commanders and leaders
Unknown	Paul

The Battle of Comacchio in 809 was a naval battle between a Byzantine fleet dispatched from Venice and the Frankish garrison of the island of Comacchio. A Byzantine fleet from Constantinople under its commander Paul, the governor of Cephalonia, arrived in Venice by way of Dalmatia and sent a fleet detachment to anchor at Comacchio. They skirmished with the Franks, were defeated and retreated to Venice.

== Footnotes ==
- Scholz, B.W. (1970). Royal Frankish Annals and Nithard's Histories. Ann Arbor: University of Michigan Press. ISBN 0-472-06186-0.
