= Perigone =

Perigone can refer to:

- In botany, the perianth of a flower, the perigonium
- In Greek mythology, Perigune
- In zoology, part of the gonophore of a Hydroid
