= Spina =

Ancient Etruscan city at the mouth of the Po

Coordinates: 44°41′35″N 12°06′04″E

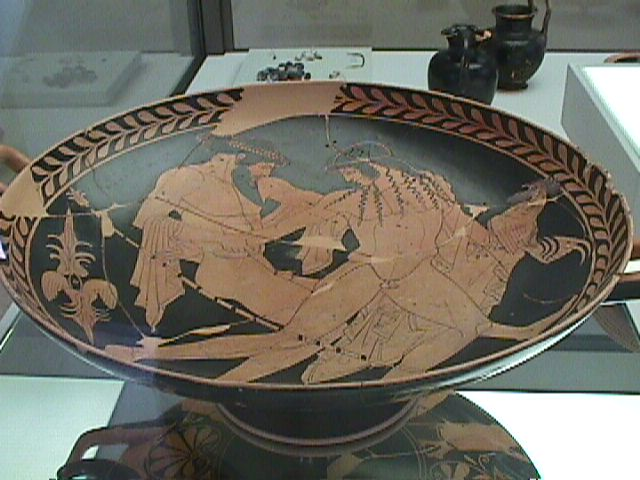
A kylix from Spina.

Spina was an Etruscan port city, located in the province of Ferrara and Emilia-Romagna region of Italy, established by the end of the 6th century BCE, on the Adriatic at the ancient mouth of the Po.

== Discovery ==
The site of Spina was lost until modern times, when drainage schemes in the delta of the Po River in 1922 first officially revealed a necropolis of Etruscan Spina about four miles west of the commune of Comacchio.

The fishermen of Comacchio, it soon turned out, had been the source of "Etruscan" vases (actually ancient imports from Greece) and other artifacts that had appeared for years on the archeological black market.

The archaeological finds from the burials of Spina were discovered with the help of aerial photography. Aside from the white reflective surfaces of the modern drainage channels there appeared in the photographs a ghostly network of dark lines and light rectangles, the former indicating richer vegetation on the sites of ancient canals. Thus the layout of the ancient trading port was revealed, now miles from the sea, due to the sedimentation of the Po delta.

== Trading centre ==
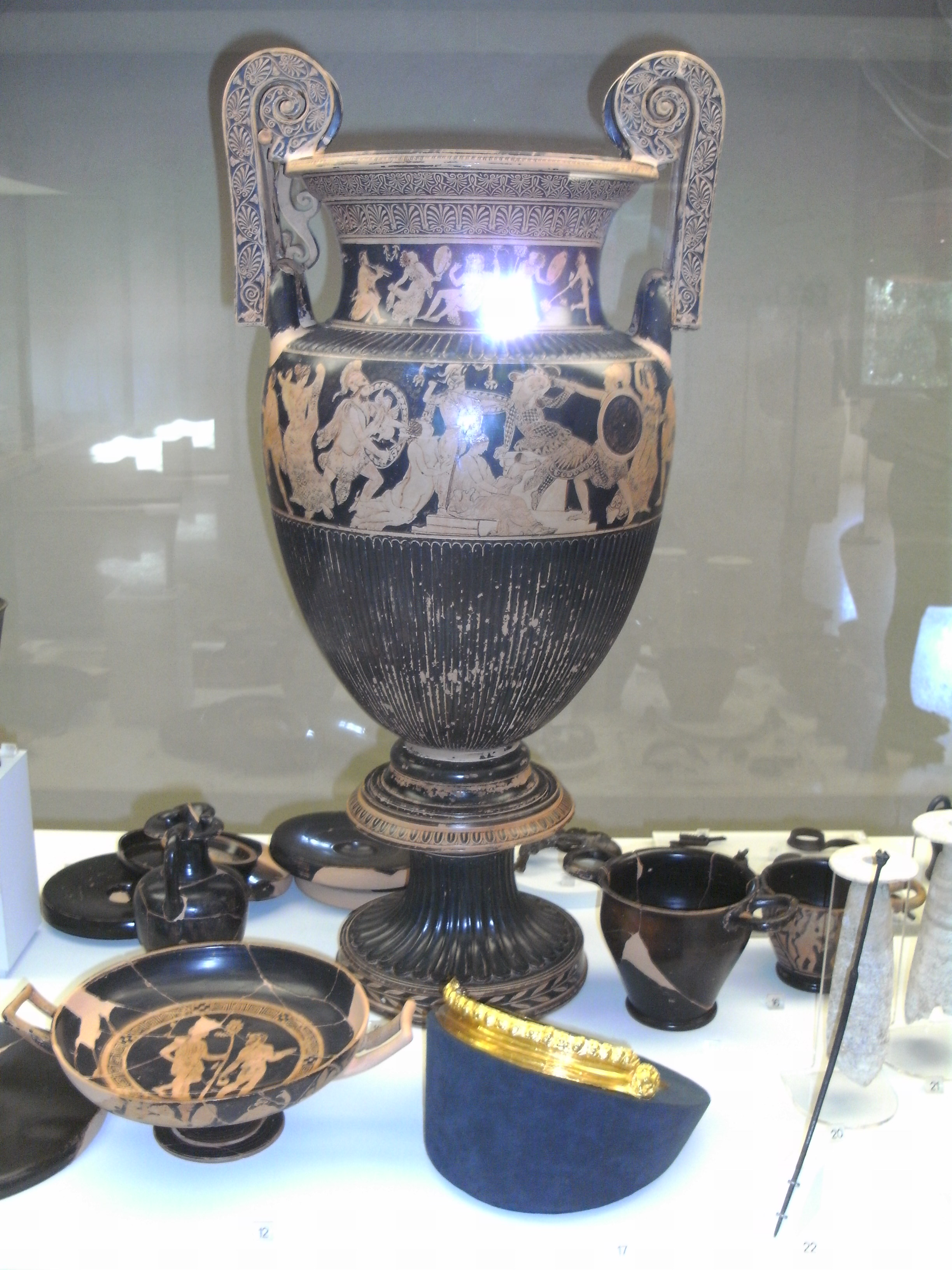
Ancient Greek pottery from the Etruscan tombs in Spina. Museo archeologico nazionale (Ferrara)

Spina was founded around 525 BC, soon after Adria. Despite the Greek foundation story mentioned by ancient authors including Pseudo-Scylax, Strabo, Justin and Pliny the Elder, it had a predominantly Etruscan population, but also a significant Greek presence.

The population of Spina became significantly Hellenised.

The city built a treasury in Delphi.

Many of the goods imported through Spina were destined for the bigger Etruscan city of Felsina (ancient name of Bologna).

The city stood at the southern end of the ancient Amber Road from the Baltic Sea. This trade was conducted through the Veneti, whose cities lay to the north. They also traded in horses, for which the Veneti were famous.

== Hydraulic engineering ==
Etruscan hydraulic engineers managed to confine the wide Po river at Spina to its bed, by the means of constructing many canals to direct its flow. As a result the disastrous spring floods were mitigated. Much other evidence of Etruscan hydraulic engineering works remains in the area. They drained the marshes and provided irrigation for dry land.

== See also ==
- National Archaeological Museum of Ferrara

== Literature ==
- Alfieri, N. (1979) Spina: Museo Archaeologico, Officine Grafiche Calderini, Bologna
- V. Izzet, 2007, The Archaeology of Etruscan Society, Cambridge.
- V. Izzet, 2008, Questions of Mediterranean migration: the case of Spina. International Congress of Classical Archaeology – XVII. Meetings Between Cultures in the Ancient Mediterranean, 22-26 September 2008, Rome c.s.
