= War of Comacchio =

The War of Comacchio (1708–1709) was the last military conflict between a Holy Roman Emperor and a Pope. The conflict was related to the War of the Spanish Succession, but had its own origins in disputes over feudal law. It did not lead to noteworthy battles. The war ended with the capitulation of Pope Clement XI.

== Imperial politics ==
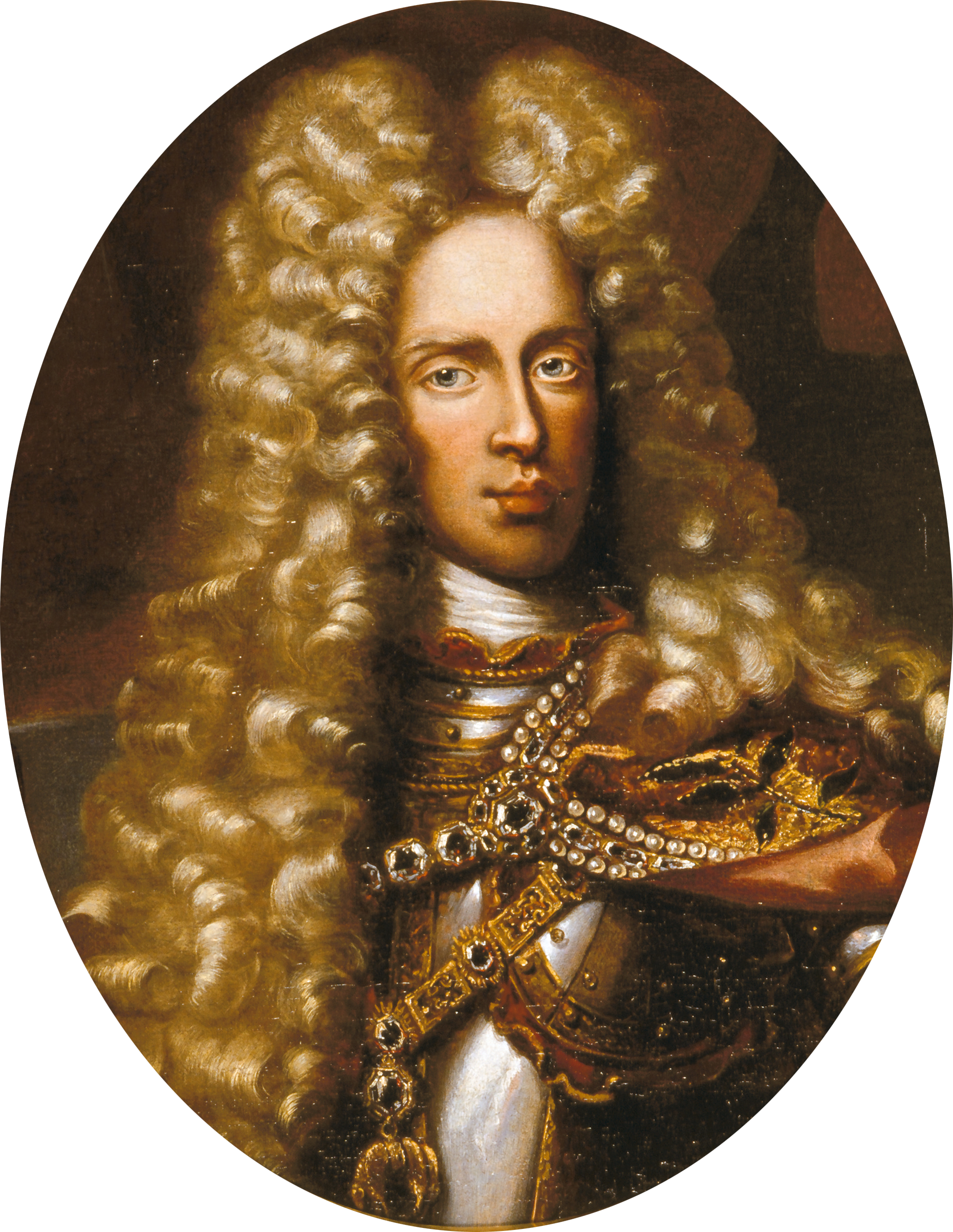
Joseph I, Emperor during the war

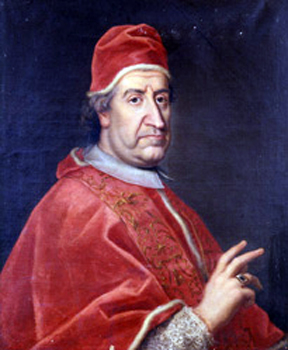
Clement XI, Pope during the war

Emperors Leopold I and Joseph I were striving to restore their rights in imperial Italy. A major point of contention regarded Parma and Piacenza, both of which were claimed by the Emperor and the Pope simultaneously. After the Siege of Turin during the War of the Spanish Succession, Joseph I strengthened his efforts to restore imperial rights in Italy. That the Pope had sided with the Bourbons against the Habsburgs also played a role in the conflict. In 1701, he had recognized Phillip of Anjou as the King of Spain. Concessions made by the Emperor to Lutherans in Silesia had also displeased the Pope.

Papal territories had already been occupied by imperial forces in the campaigns of 1706 and 1707. In the territories considered to be part of the Empire, war taxes were levied. The Pope had retaliated with ecclesiastical penalties directed at imperial commanders and officials. Rinaldo d’Este, Duke of Modena, had sided with the Emperor, and his territories had suffered at the hands of French troops. He proceeded to claim the rule of the Duchy of Ferrara and the County of Comacchio. Both of these areas belonged to the Papal States. However, the Duke presented documents that stated the territories were really part of the Empire. His account of the matter was believed in Vienna.

The Emperor allowed General Claude Alexandre de Bonneval to occupy Comacchio on May 24, 1708. The imperial troops began to fortify the city and built a tower with an inscription meant to strengthen the imperial claim. These events triggered an open conflict. Behind the decision to escalate stood among others the Empress Wilhelmine Amalie of Brunswick-Lüneburg, who was also the sister of the Duchess of Modena. Another force behind the move was Charles Theodore, Prince of Salm. The Emperor himself approved the course of action, although Eugene of Savoy and others had advised against it. The goal was the Pope’s recognition of Archduke Charles as King of Spain and the expansion of imperial influence in Italy. A statement was released sharply criticizing the politics of the Pope. The Pope was accused of usurping feudal rights over Parma and Piacenza, supporting France, and punishing the imperial generals with unjust ecclesiastical rulings. This statement was interpreted by the papal court as a declaration of war.

== Course of the war ==
The Pope, pressured by cardinals friendly to France, began to prepare for the fight. His troops were under the command of Luigi Ferdinando Marsili, who had been dishonorably discharged from the imperial army. Altogether his army numbered around 25,000 men. All things considered, this force was of little military use and more closely resembled a band of robbers than a disciplined army. The Pope could not hope for military support from Louis XIV, who was himself in a critical strategic situation. The Pope called out in vain to all princes of the Catholic faith, including ecclesiastical princes in the Holy Roman Empire, for support.

The leadership in Vienna was completely surprised by the Pope’s military preparations, but could no longer reverse course without a loss of face. The conflict was nonetheless highly problematic for the Catholic Emperor. Anti-clerical voices within the Empire grew louder, and Joseph I. had to be careful to avoid finding himself at the head of an anti-papal movement. More and more advisors spoke against war. The imperial court dispatched Hercule-Louis Turinetti, marquis of Prié to Rome to negotiate. At the same time, the goal of reclaiming lost imperial territory was strengthened.

The course of the conflict was far from spectacular. Units from Brandenburg, mostly Protestant troops, also accompanied the march into the Papal States and advanced quickly. The Papal troops were pushed back. Wirich Philipp von Daun occupied a large part of the Papal States. Ferrara was put under siege. Worries about another Sack of Rome meant that the capital was left untouched. The Pope abandoned plans he had made to flee to Avignon. The war was not energetically pursued by the Emperor, as the Habsburgs felt their legitimacy was fundamentally bound to the Papacy. That the war between them had actually broken out was hardly to be believed.

== Outcome ==
In the meantime, the imperial envoy had arrived in Rome. The Pope handled him sharply and put forward his own demands. Prié answered that he had not heard so far of any great victories by the Papal troops. He presented the imperial terms and set an ultimatum that was to expire on January 15, 1709. The war ended on this day, when the Pope capitulated one hour before the expiration of the ultimatum.

The Pope felt himself forced to accept the imperial peace terms. These included the reduction of the Papal forces to only 5,000 troops and the stationing of six imperial regiments in the Papal States. The ecclesiastical penalties were revoked by the bishops of Milan and Naples. Imperial troops were allowed to march through the Papal States at will. Regarding the question of the disputed territories, no consensus was reached. In a secret treaty that was only signed after another ultimatum, the Pope recognized Charles III as King of Spain. In the matter of Comacchio, the Emperor yielded. The actual handing over of the territory did not take place until 1725. The last war between a Holy Roman Emperor and a Pope had seemingly ended with a clear imperial victory. Apart from the restoration of feudal rights over Parma and Piacenza, imperial gains from the triumph were relatively minor.

== Bibliography ==
- Karl Vocelka: Glanz und Untergang der höfischen Welt. Repräsentation, Reform und Reaktion im habsburger Vielvölkerstaat. Vienna, 2001. p. 150–151.
- Karl Otmar von Aretin: Das Alte Reich 1648–1806. Volume 2. Stuttgart, 2005. p. 206–214.
