= Comacchio Cathedral =

- Cathedral of Saint Cassian
- Basilica di San Cassiano (Italian)
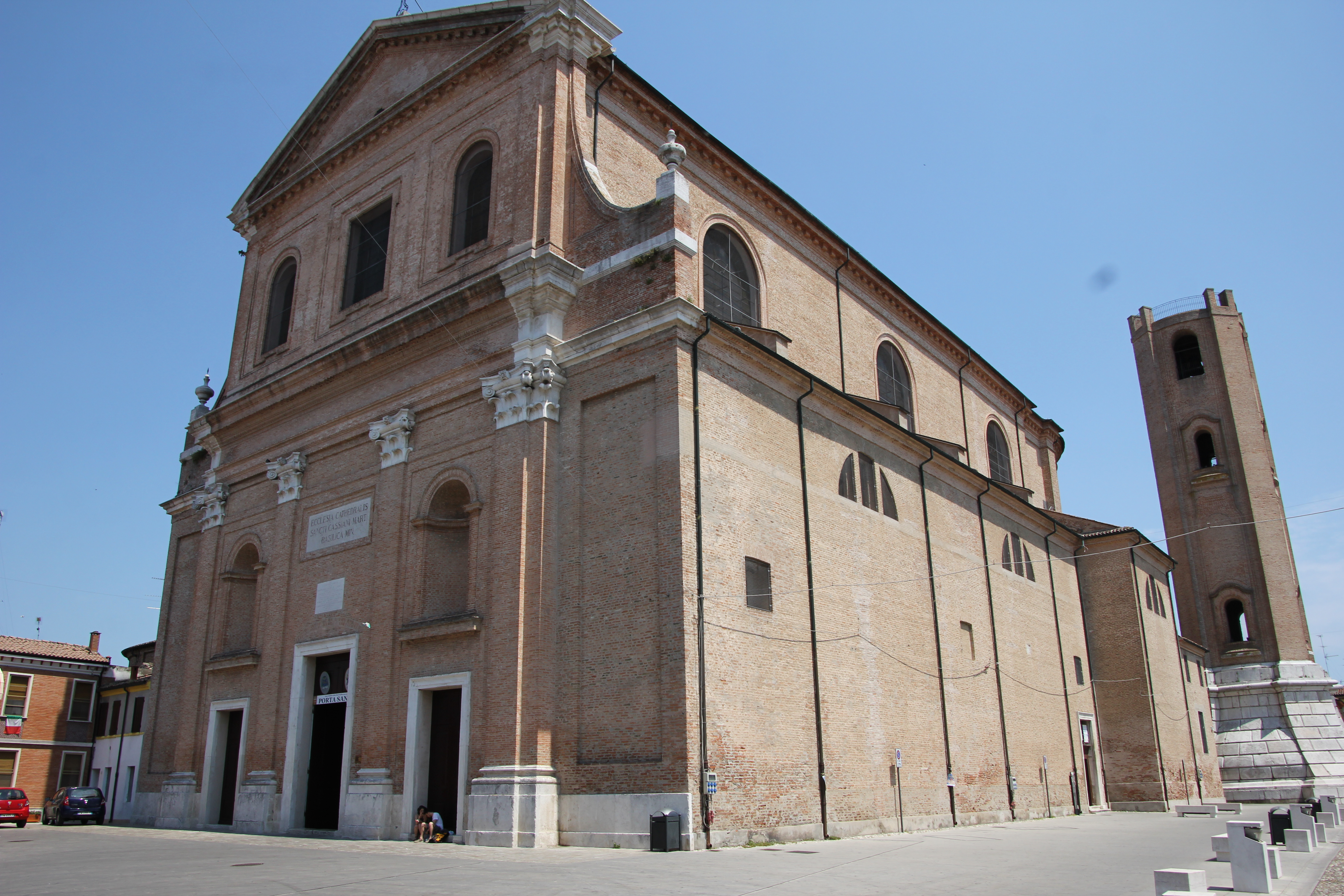
- Comacchio Cathedral
- 44°41′45″N 12°10′52.7″E
- Location: Comacchio
- Country: Italy
- Denomination: Catholic
- Tradition: Roman Rite

History
- Dedication: Saint Cassian of Imola

Architecture
- Style: Baroque
- Groundbreaking: 1659
- Completed: 1740

Administration
- Archdiocese: Ferrara-Comacchio

Comacchio Cathedral (Italian: Duomo di Comacchio; Cattedrale di San Cassiano), also the Basilica of San Cassiano, is a Baroque Roman Catholic cathedral and minor basilica dedicated to Saint Cassian of Imola (San Cassiano) in the city of Comacchio, in the province of Ferrara, Emilia-Romagna, Italy. Formerly the seat of the bishops of Comacchio, it has been since 1986 a co-cathedral in the Archdiocese of Ferrara-Comacchio.

== History ==
Dedicated to the patron of the town, this church stands on the site of the ancient Romanesque cathedral built in 708 and torn down in 1694. Construction of the new cathedral began in 1659 under the Bishop of Comacchio, Sigismondo Isei, with consecration finally in 1740. In 1961 the church was made a minor basilica by Pope John XXIII.

== Description ==
The brick facade with some Istrian stone is plain. The interior has twelve chapels, and the interior houses 18th-century canvases by Biagio Bovi, a wooden crucifix by the 17th-century sculptor Germano Cignani, and a 15th-century sculpture of Santa Lucia. The apse houses the 18th-century marble altar and the 16th-century wooden statue of the Martyr Cassiano, patron of the town and diocese. Above the entry portal is the organ, built in 1728 in Modena by Giovanni Domenico Traeri.

The bell-tower was built first in 1751 by Giorgio Fossati but this collapsed in 1757. Reconstruction of a lower tower was completed by 1868.

== See also ==
- Roman Catholic Archdiocese of Ferrara-Comacchio
