= Santa Maria in Aula Regia, Comacchio =

Roman Catholic church in Comacchio, Ferrara, Italy

Coordinates: 44.6999°N 12.1723°E

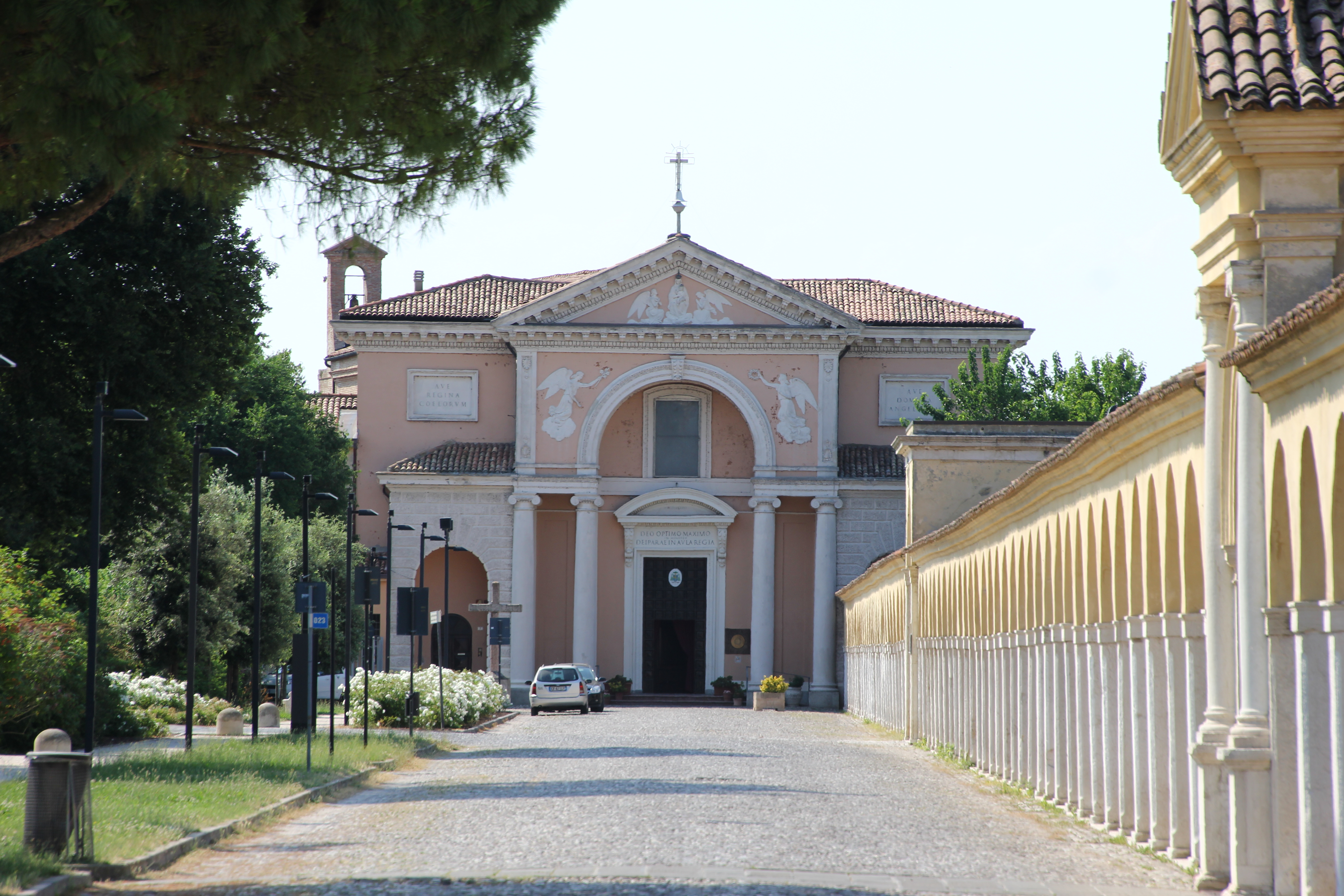
Sanctuary of Santa Maria in Aula Regia.

The Sanctuary of Santa Maria in Aula Regia is a Roman Catholic church located in the town of Comacchio, in the province of Ferrara, region of Emilia-Romagna, Italy.

== History ==
Located in the west portion of the town, it is also known as the church of the Cappuccini. The site once was the site during the 10-12th-centuries for the Monastery of Santa Maria in Auregiario. In 1570, the property was granted by the Duke Alfonso II d'Este to the Capuchin order. A new church was built in 1665, with a later Neoclassic-style façade. The interior is notable for a terra-cotta image of Santa Maria in Aula Regia.
