= Cassian of Imola =

Bishop of Brescia

Saint Cassian of Imola
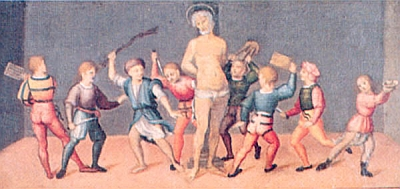
- Martyrdom of Saint Cassian, ca. 1500. Innocenzo Francucci.

Martyr
- Died: August 13, 363
- Venerated in: Catholic Church, Eastern Orthodox Church
- Feast: August 13
- Patronage: Imola, Mexico City, San Casciano in Val di Pesa, Las Galletas (Tenerife), schoolteachers, shorthand-writers, parish clerks.

Cassian, or Saint Cassian of Imola, or Cassius was a Christian saint of the 4th century. His feast day is August 13.

== Life ==
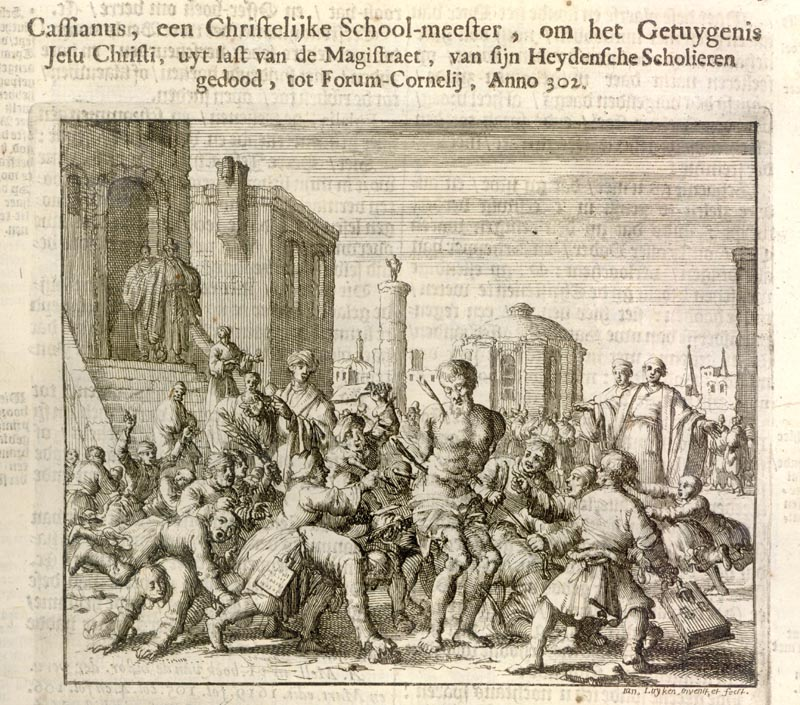
Cassian being killed by his pupils. From the Dutch Martyrs Mirror.

Little is known about his life, although the traditional accounts converge on some of the details of his martyrdom. He was a schoolmaster at Imola, and for refusing to sacrifice to the Roman gods, as ordered by the current emperor, Julian the Apostate, he was condemned to death and turned over to his own pupils. Since they were eager for revenge for the many punishments he had inflicted on them, they bound him to a stake and tortured him to death by stabbing him with their pointed iron styli, the devices then used to mark wooden or wax writing tablets. Cassian suffered in one of the persecutions of the fourth century, but which specific persecution cannot be assigned with any certainty.

He was interred by the Christians at Imola, where afterwards his relics were honoured with a rich mausolæum. His traditional date of martyrdom is August 13, 363, hence August 13 is his feast day on the Roman calendar. Cassian is the patron saint of Mexico City, Imola (Italy), Sukošan (Croatia), the De La Salle Brothers, Lasallian Educators, and of parish clerks. Comacchio Cathedral and Cathedral of Brixen are dedicated to him. He is also the patron saint of the localities of San Casciano in Val di Pesa and San Casciano dei Bagni (both Italy) and Las Galletas (Tenerife, Spain). St Cassian's Centre is named for him.

== Cultural references ==
In the novel A Confederacy of Dunces by John Kennedy Toole, protagonist Ignatius Reilly informs one of his professors that "St. Cassian of Imola was stabbed to death by his students with their styli," a holy death that his professor would not merit. Annie Dillard also makes reference to him in her 1992 novel The Living. Bethel College had a Cassianus Lounge in the faculty offices area.

The German jurist Carl Schmitt, named the place in which he spent his late years (in Plettenberg) as "San Casciano". According to the common opinion (for Schmitt, the most obvious interpretation), this referred to some place near Florence, Italy (called San Casciano) in which Machiavelli spent the time during which he wrote some of his most influential works.

In Ride the Cyclone, a 2008 musical with a 2016 Off-Broadway run, the cast of deceased students are all members of the fictional St. Cassian High School Chamber Choir.
