= National Archaeological Museum of Ferrara =

Archaeological museum of Florence, Italy

- Museo archeologico nazionale di Ferrara
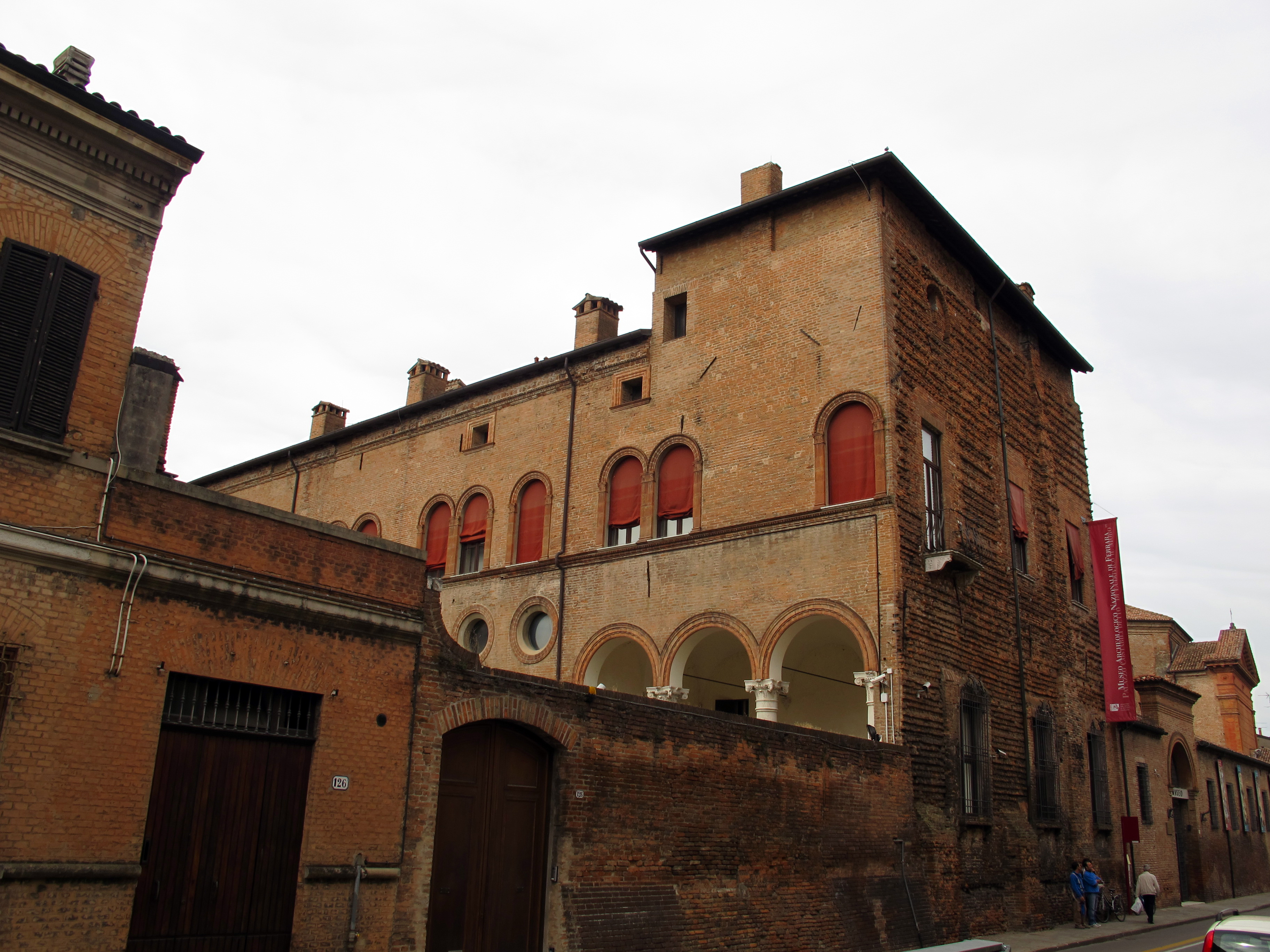
- Palazzo costabili
- Interactive fullscreen map
- Location: Ferrara, Italy
- Coordinates: 44°49′39″N 11°37′38″E
- Type: Archaeology

The National Archaeological Museum of Ferrara is housed in Palazzo Costabili, in Ferrara, Italy. It holds various excavated artifacts from the Etruscan city of Spina, which flourished between the 6th and 3rd centuries BC. The ancient city of Spina, close to modern Comacchio was abandoned in the 2nd century BC, but was discovered by chance in 1922 and was excavated.

The exhibition is organized into two parts. The ground floor holds items related to the city of Spina and the daily activities there. A special section is dedicated to religious life of the city, manifested by epigraphic evidence. The ground floor also holds two monohull boats (commonly referred to as pirogues) recovered in 1948 in the Isola Valley. The boats date back to the late Roman period (III-IV century BC).

On the upper floor, items found in the city necropolis are exhibited according to chronological criteria. These include kraters, amphorae etc. produced by Athenian artists of the 5th and 4th centuries BC. The paintings represent mythological scenes and everyday life, and indicate the spread of Greek art in the Etruscan sphere. Other ceramics, mainly from the 4th and 3rd centuries BC, come from Magna Graecia and Sicily. In addition, jewels in gold, silver, amber and semiprecious stones, made by the ancient artisans of the Po and Central Italian Etruria, are displayed.

== Some excavated items ==
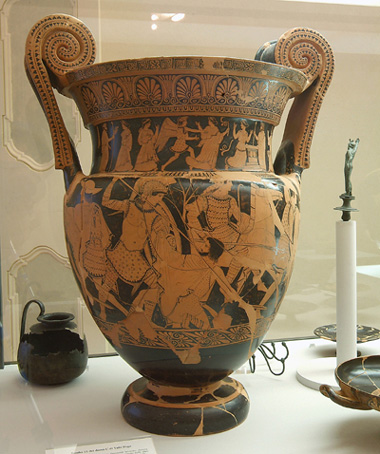
A Krater

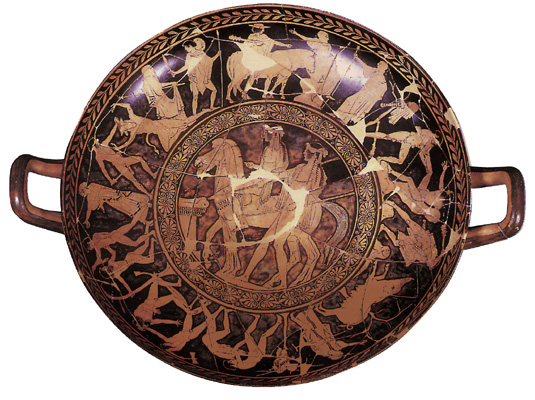
A Kylix

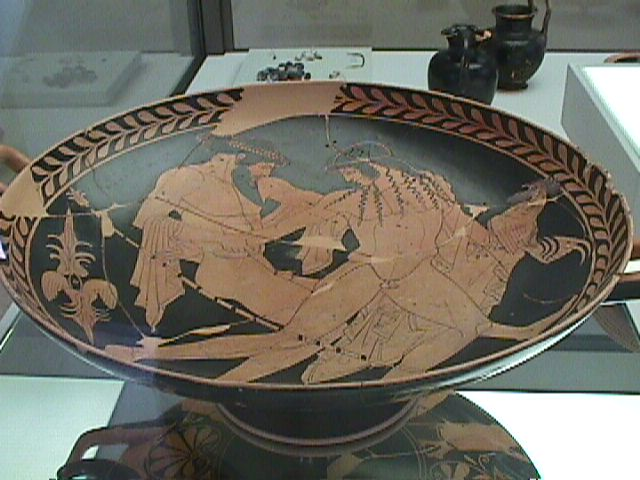
A Kylix

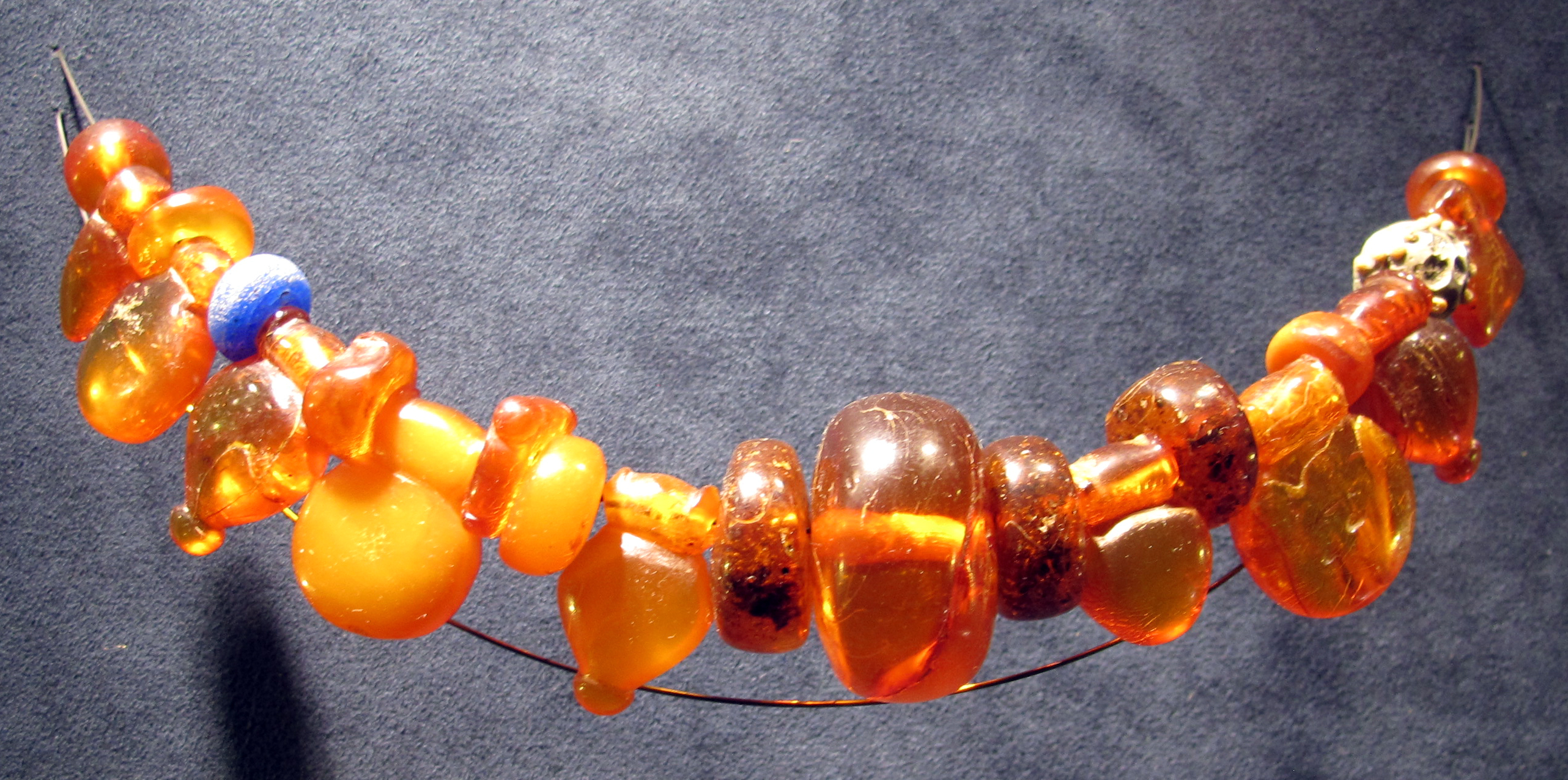
A necklace
