= Mala Amerika =

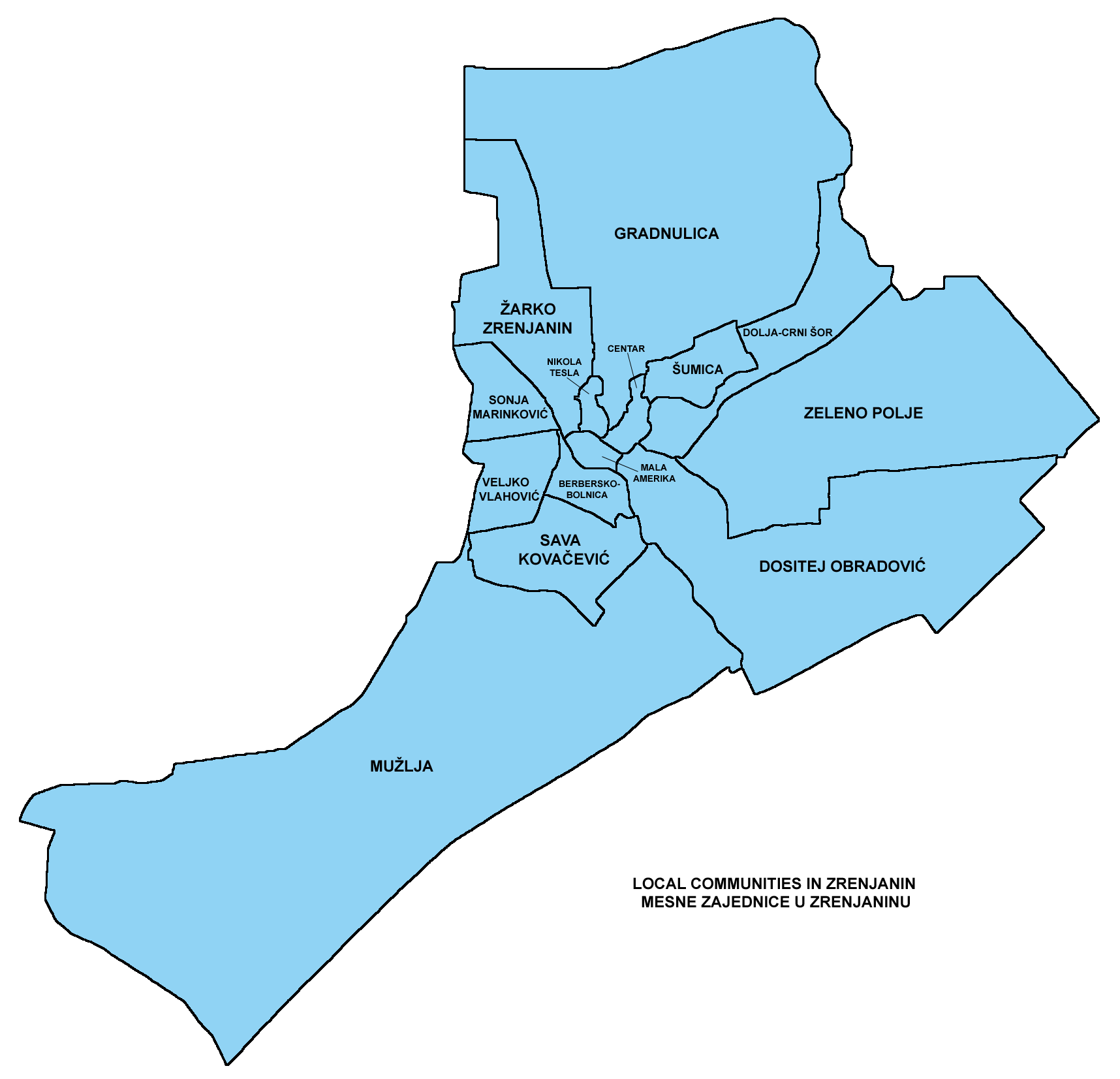
Map of urban local communities of Zrenjanin

Mala Amerika (Serbian Cyrillic: Мала Америка; literally: "Little America") is one of the local communities in the city of Zrenjanin, Serbia. It is surrounded by the river Begej. The area used to be an island before the reconstruction projects were undertaken in the early 1980s, when that particular section of the river was cut up into three man-made lakes.
