= Valli di Comacchio =

Series of contiguous brackish lagoons in northern Italy

- Valli residue del comprensorio di Comacchio
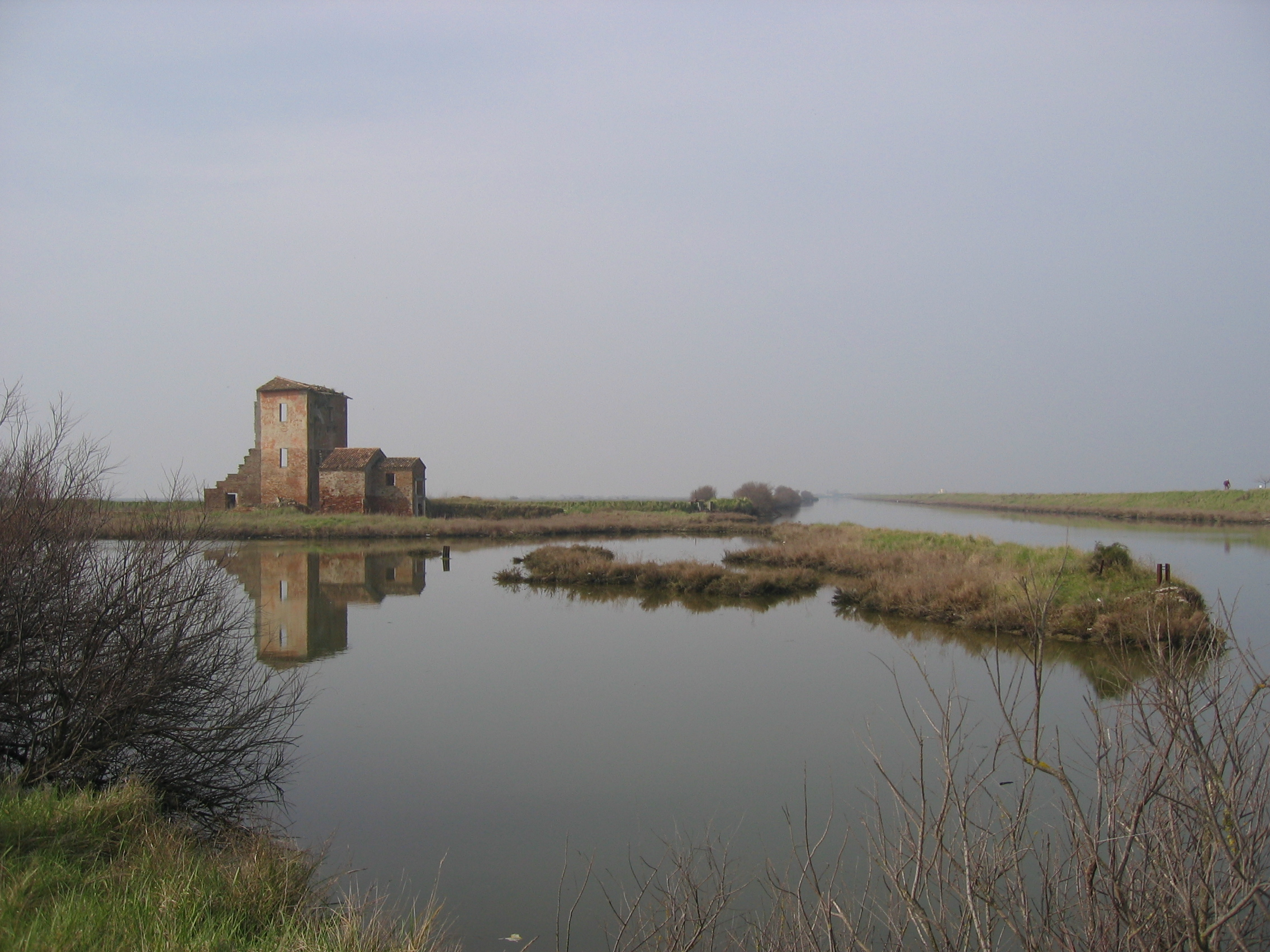
- Saline ponds in Comacchio

- Location within Italy
- Location: Emilia-Romagna, Italy
- Nearest city: Comacchio
- Coordinates: 44°36′55″N 12°10′01″E
- Area: 130 km^{2} (50 sq mi)
- Governing body: Region of Emilia-Romagna
- Website: www.vallidicomacchio.it/eco.htm

Ramsar Wetland
- Official name: Valli residue del comprensorio di Comacchio
- Designated: 4 September 1981
- Reference no.: 225

The Valli di Comacchio are a series of contiguous brackish lagoons situated to the south of Comacchio, close to the Adriatic coast of the Emilia-Romagna region in northern Italy. They lie within the comuni of Comacchio and Argenta in the province of Ferrara, and the comune of Ravenna in the province of Ravenna.

The area, covering almost 17000 hectares within the Parco regionale del Delta del Po, is classified as a Site of Community Importance and a Special Protection Area. It is also rated internationally important by the Ramsar Convention for the conservation and sustainable use of wetlands.

== Description ==
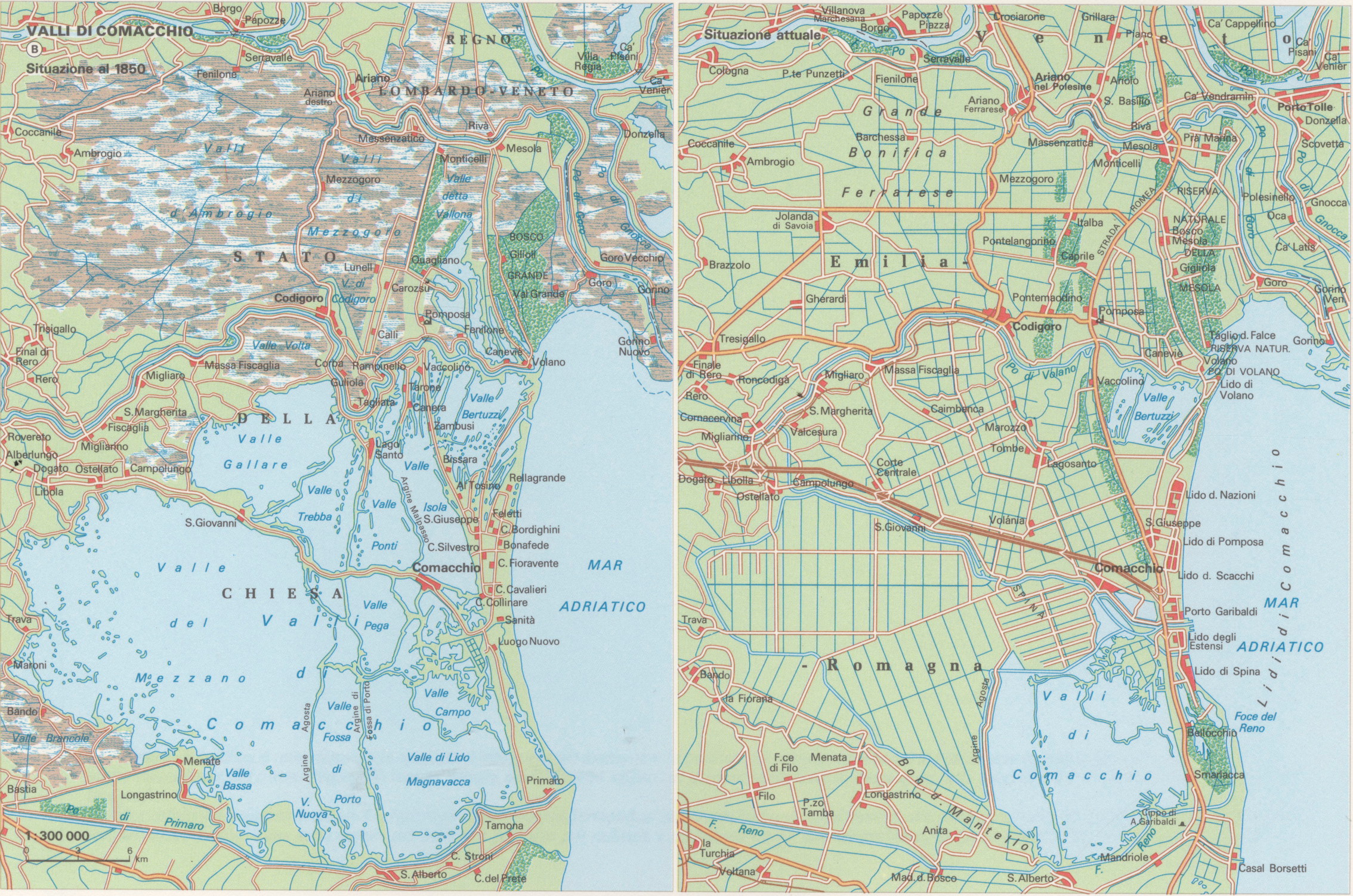
Comparison of the Valli di Comacchio before (left, c. 1850) and after (right) the various land reclamation projects.

The lagoon and wetland complex consists four principal basins – the Valle Lido di Magnavacca, the Valle Fossa di Porto, the Valle Campo and the Valle Fattibell – and several smaller ones; approximately ten kilometres to the north, also in the territory of Comacchio, is the Valle Bertuzzi. The lagoons were formed around the tenth century due to subsidence of the soil and silting of the coastal zone. At the time of formation, the area was flooded with fresh water from the recurrent flooding of the rivers. From the sixteenth century on, they gradually were filled with sea water resulting in the modern appearance of brackish water-filled basins.

The original extent of the Valli di Comacchio – covering about 73000 hectares – was progressively reduced as a result of various land reclamation projects. In the twenty-first century, the coverage of the wetlands is around 13000 hectares, from the Comune of Comacchio to the river Reno. The Valli di Comacchio remain some of the largest wetlands in Italy.

== Flora ==
Oaks, pines, and beech trees are prevalent in higher ground areas, while reeds and tamarisk are common in other parts of the area. Additionally, many types of flowers can be found, including several species of Limonium. In this region there are many pine forests, most notably those of Cervia and Ravenna as well as the Mesola Forest.

== Fauna ==
The Valli di Comacchio are home to the greatest variety of birds of Italy. There are over 300 species of birds such as flamingos, black-winged stilts, egrets and other herons and kingfishers. In addition, there are fish such as bream, eels, sea bass, mullet, and sole. Foxes are common.

== Exploitation ==
Fishing is a common occupation: in fact there are still many fishing settlements in the area today. Typical of the area are fishing lodges mounted on poles in the water. These structures serve both as fishing stations and places to monitor for illegal fishing. Also common are eel-fishing basins called lavorieri. There are numerous salt-panning facilities in the area.
