= Ponte dei Trepponti =

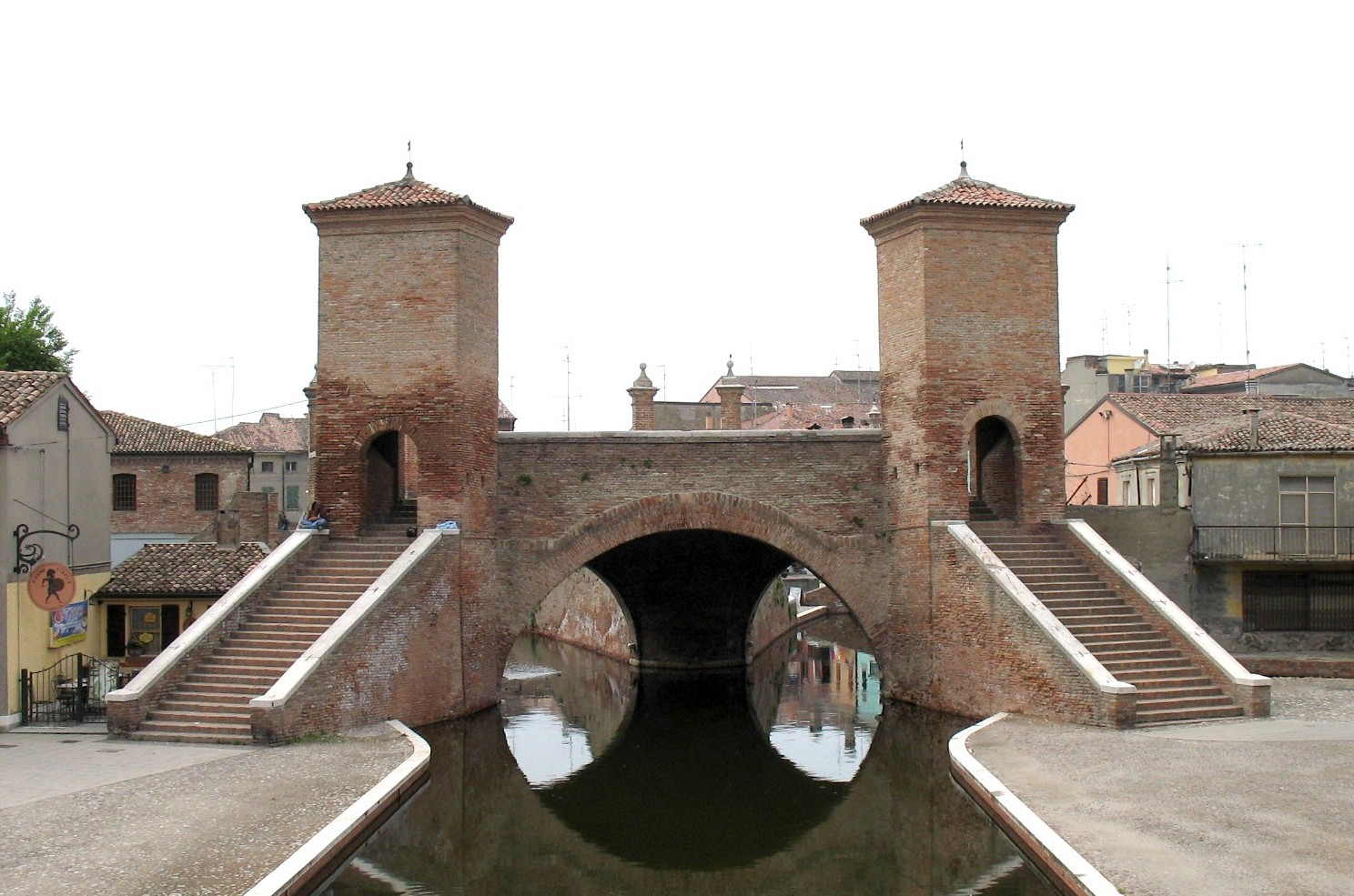
- Coordinates: 44.692984°N 12.18329°E
- Crosses: Palotta canal
- Locale: Comacchio, Italy

History
- Architect: Luca Danese
- Construction end: 1638

The Ponte dei Trepponti or Trepponti bridge is a masonry arch bridge in Comacchio, Italy. It spans the Palotta canal, which splits up underneath it. The Trepponti bridge is a rare example of a five-way multi-way bridge.

== Description ==
The name Trepponti, originating from the word tre (three) and ponti (bridge) refers to the split in the canal underneath the bridge - however, technically speaking the Trepponti bridge consists of not three but five stone arch bridges, as the Sant'Agostino and San Petro canals that made up the old Comacchio moat also intersect the canal here. The five bridges are connected by a central Istrian stone floor that makes up a small pentagonally-shaped public square, held up by a cross-vaulted ceiling. Five large staircases connect the bridge to the city streets and the fish market below. Two guard towers stand over the bridge's southeastern side. Several columns serve a decorative purpose.

On the rightmost tower is a plaque that contains a passage from the Italian poet Torquato Tasso that references Comacchio:

Like the fish where our sea becomes swampy / in the breasts of Comacchio, / escapes from the impetuous and raw wave / looking in placid waters where it shelters, / and it comes that from itself and locks itself up / in marshy prison nor can it return, / that that menagerie is with wonderful use / always to enter open, to exit closed.

— Torquato Tasso

== History ==
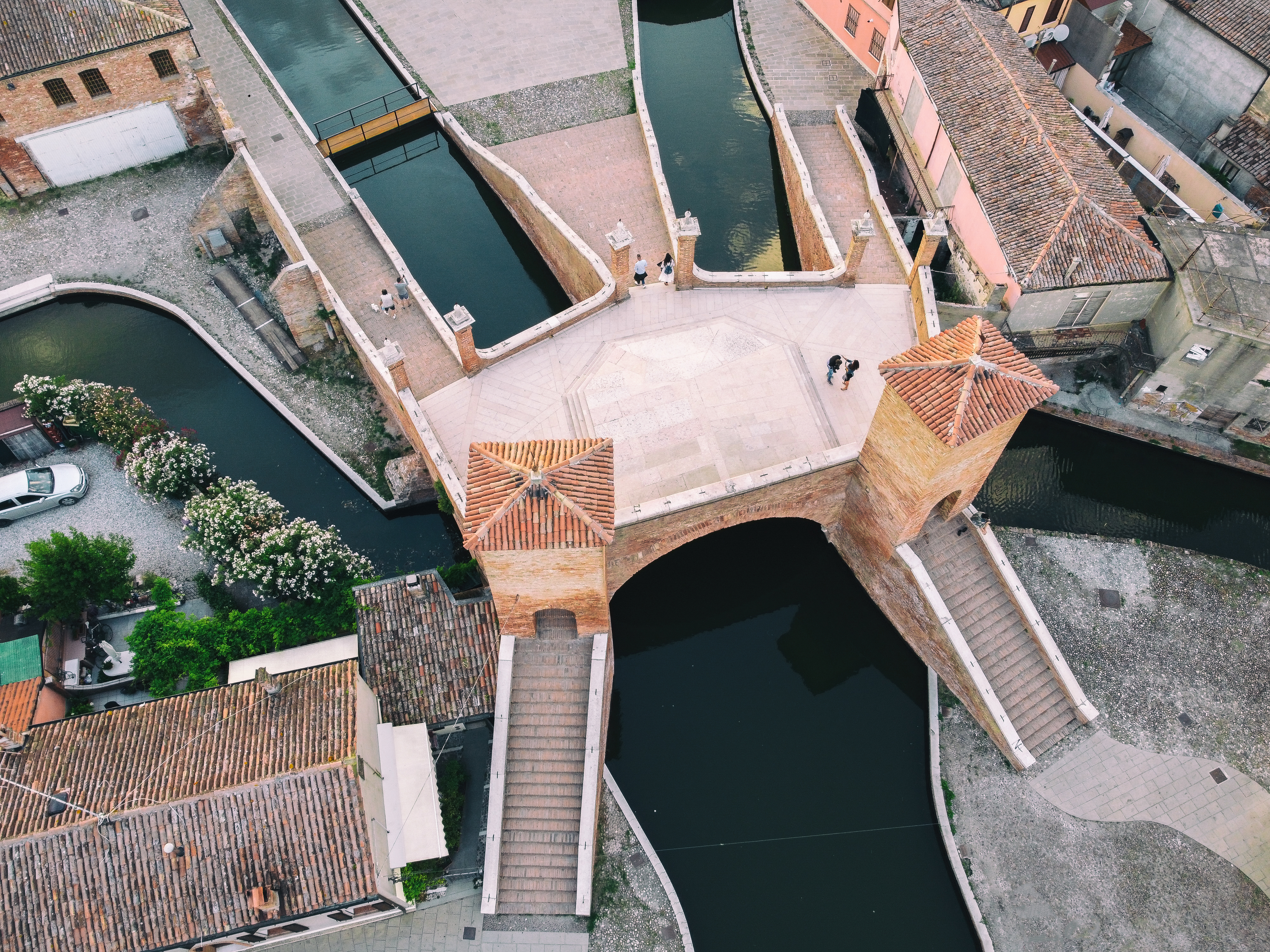
The bridge top view

In the 16th century, Comacchio was ruled by the Papal States. Cardinal Giovan Battista Pallotta commissioned the Trepponti bridge as part of the city's renovation, and Capuchin Giovanni Pietro da Lugano constructed it. Comacchio had been raided by assailants in the past decades and was left in disrepair. Ravennese architect Luca Danese was tasked with drafting the city's renovation plans and designed the Trepponti bridge as part of its new defensive works. The Trepponti bridge would be one of the city's main gates as well as the entryway into its internal canal network. It was completed in 1638.

Upon initial construction, the Trepponti bridge did not yet have its distinctive guard towers: they were added in 1695 to reinforce the defensive parapets, under the rule of Cardinal Giuseppe Renato Imperiali. During his rule, the side walls of the staircase were also raised for defensive purposes. A fish market was created at the city gate at some later point in time. In 1823, the parapets were removed and replaced by decorative columns under the guidance of Ferraran engineer Giovanni Tosi.
