= Santo Rosario, Comacchio =

Church building in Comacchio

Coordinates: 44.69440°N 12.18424°E

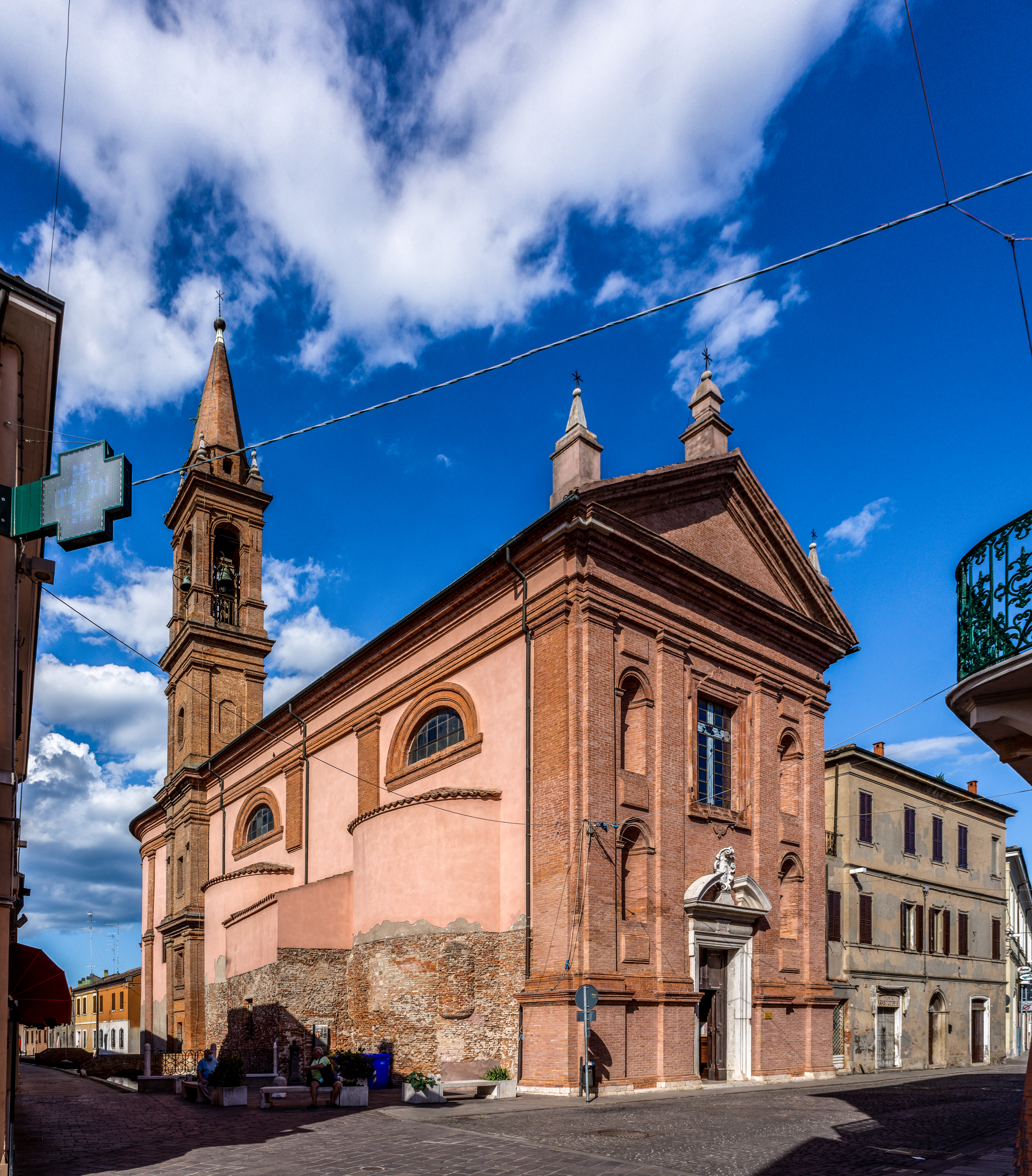
Chiesa del Rosario Centro storico di Comacchio.jpg

The Chiesa del Santo Rosario or Church of the Rosary is a Baroque-style, Roman Catholic church located in Piazza del Popolo in the city of Comacchio, in the province of Ferrara, region of Emilia-Romagna, Italy.

== History ==
The church was built in 1618 by the Confraternity of the Santo Rosario. The facade is in red brick, the portal in white Istrian stone. Four niches on the facade are empty.

The interior houses a main altarpiece depicting a Madonna of the Rosary with Sts Dominic & Giustina (1640-1650) by Cesare Mezzogori. In the lower background of the painting is a depiction of the Battle of Lepanto. The painting is a reworking of the design of Guido Reni's Pallione del Voto o della Peste (1630). Reni in his painting has seven saints pleading to a Virgin and child with angels. Mezzogori has only two saints who receive a rosary from the Virgin and Child (in same posture as the Reni painting); an angel in the lower corner, points to battle, and has a banner that states "Non armis sed rosis" or "not with arms but with roses (Rosary)", implying the prayer granted victory.

The wooden crucifix (1641) at the main altar was carved by Filippo de Porris. Two other altarpieces in the church are an Annunciation attributed to Jacopo Bambini and a Beheading of St John the Baptist by Carlo Bononi.

Much of the interior decoration was lost during the Second World War. The belltower had been reconstructed in 1752, after collapse of the prior one.
