= Comacchio =

- Comune
- Comune di Comacchio
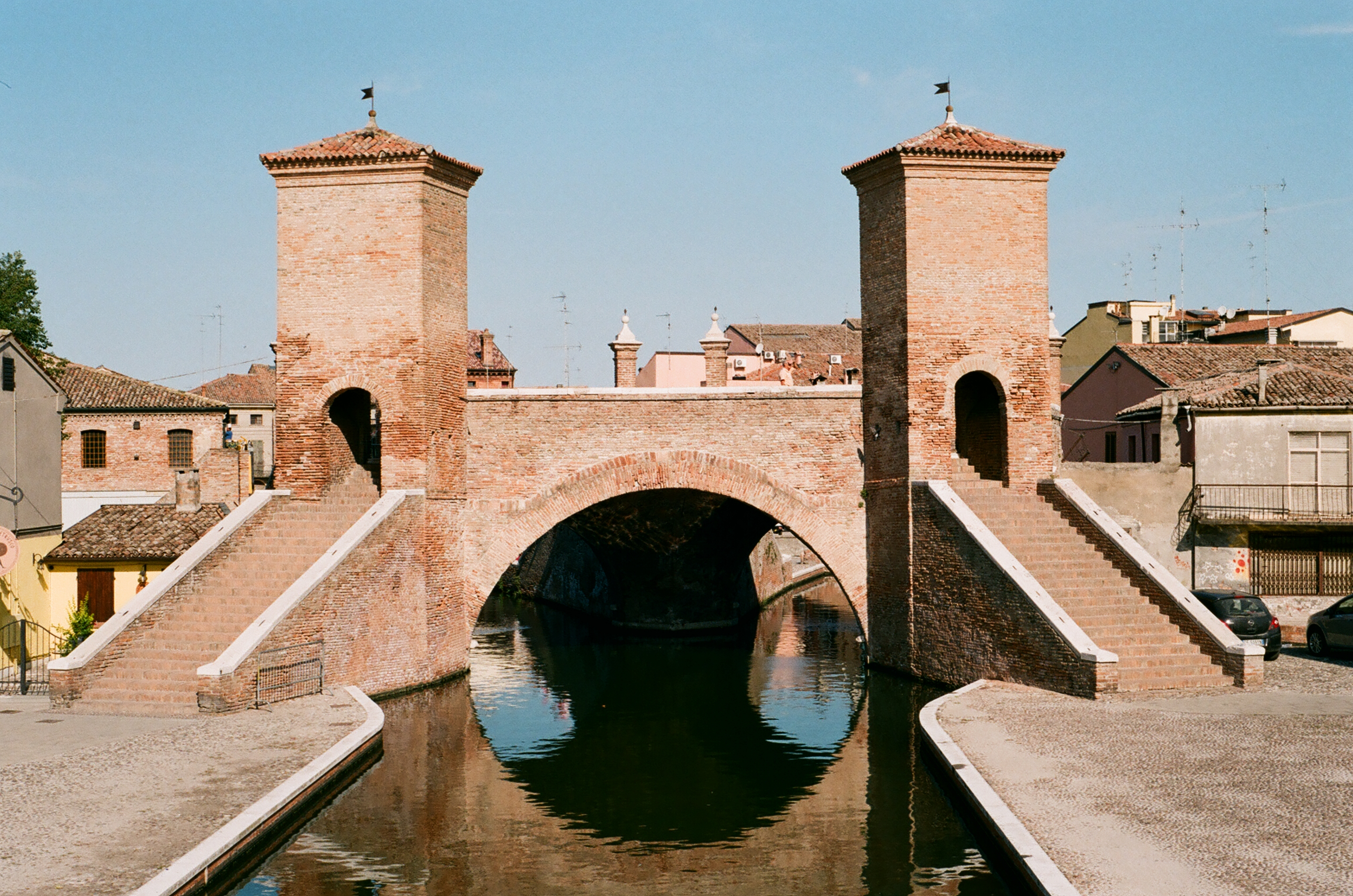
- Ponte dei Trepponti (1638), built by Giovanni Pietro da Lugano to a design by Luca Danese of Ravenna

- Flag Coat of arms

- Location of Comacchio in Italy Comacchio (Emilia-Romagna)
- Coordinates: 44°42′N 12°11′E
- Country: Italy
- Region: Emilia-Romagna
- Province: Ferrara (FE)
- Frazioni: Lido degli Estensi, Lido degli Scacchi, Lido di Pomposa, Lido di Spina, Porto Garibaldi, San Giuseppe, Lido delle Nazioni, Lido di Volano, Vaccolino, Volania

Government
  - Mayor: Pierluigi Negri

Area
  - Total: 284.13 km^{2} (109.70 sq mi)
- Elevation: 1 m (3.3 ft)

Population (31 August 2021)
  - Total: 21,813
  - Density: 76.771/km^{2} (198.84/sq mi)
- Demonym: Comacchiesi
- Time zone: UTC+1 (CET)
  - Summer (DST): UTC+2 (CEST)
- Postal code: 44022
- Dialing code: 0533
- ISTAT code: 038006
- Patron saint: San Cassiano
- Website: Official website

Comacchio (Italian: [koˈmakkjo]; Comacchiese: Cmâc' [kˈmaːts]) is a town and comune of Emilia Romagna, Italy, in the province of Ferrara, 48 kilometres (30 mi) from the provincial capital Ferrara. It was founded about two thousand years ago; across its history it was first governed by the Exarchate of Ravenna, then by the Duchy of Ferrara, and eventually returned to be part of the territories of the Papal States. For its landscape and its history, it is considered one of the major centres of the Po delta. Comacchio is part of the UNESCO World Heritage site "Ferrara, City of the Renaissance, and its Po Delta."

== Geography ==
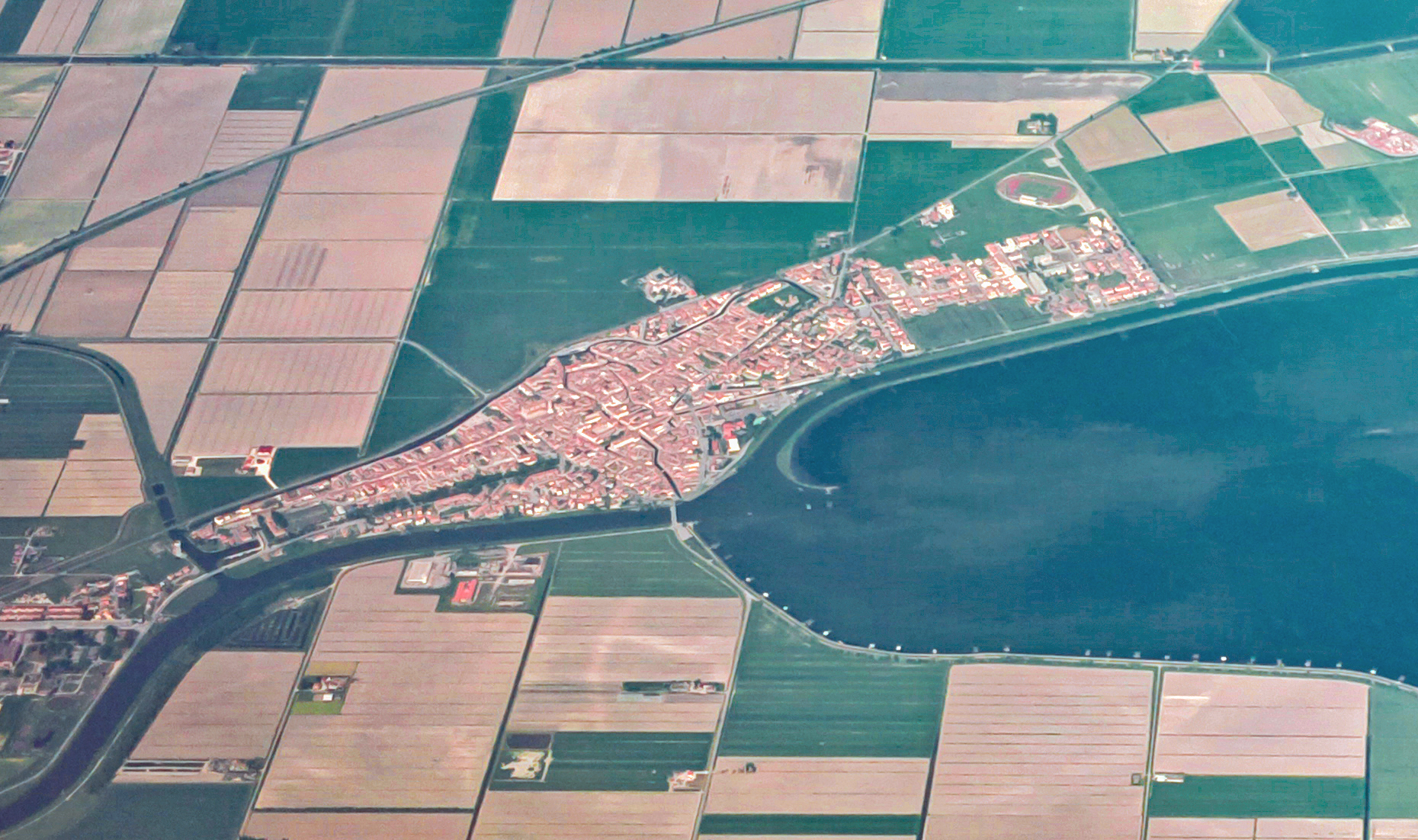
Aerial view of Comacchio

Comacchio is situated in a lagoon just north of the present mouth of the Reno. It is built on more than thirteen different islets, joined by bridges. The most important resources of these wetlands are the fish farming and the salt ponds. The seaport of Porto Garibaldi lies 7 kilometres (4 mi) to the east. The wetlands south of the town, the Valli di Comacchio, are classified as a Site of Community Importance and a Special Protection Area in Italy. They are also rated internationally important by the Ramsar Convention for the conservation and sustainable use of wetlands.

== Etymology ==
The etymology of the town's name is uncertain (Greek-Latin cumaculum meaning "small wave"; "grouping of bumps" in Etruscan). The foundation is attributed to the Etruscans, who were already settled in the Po delta: the Etruscan city of Spina rose near Comacchio.

== History ==
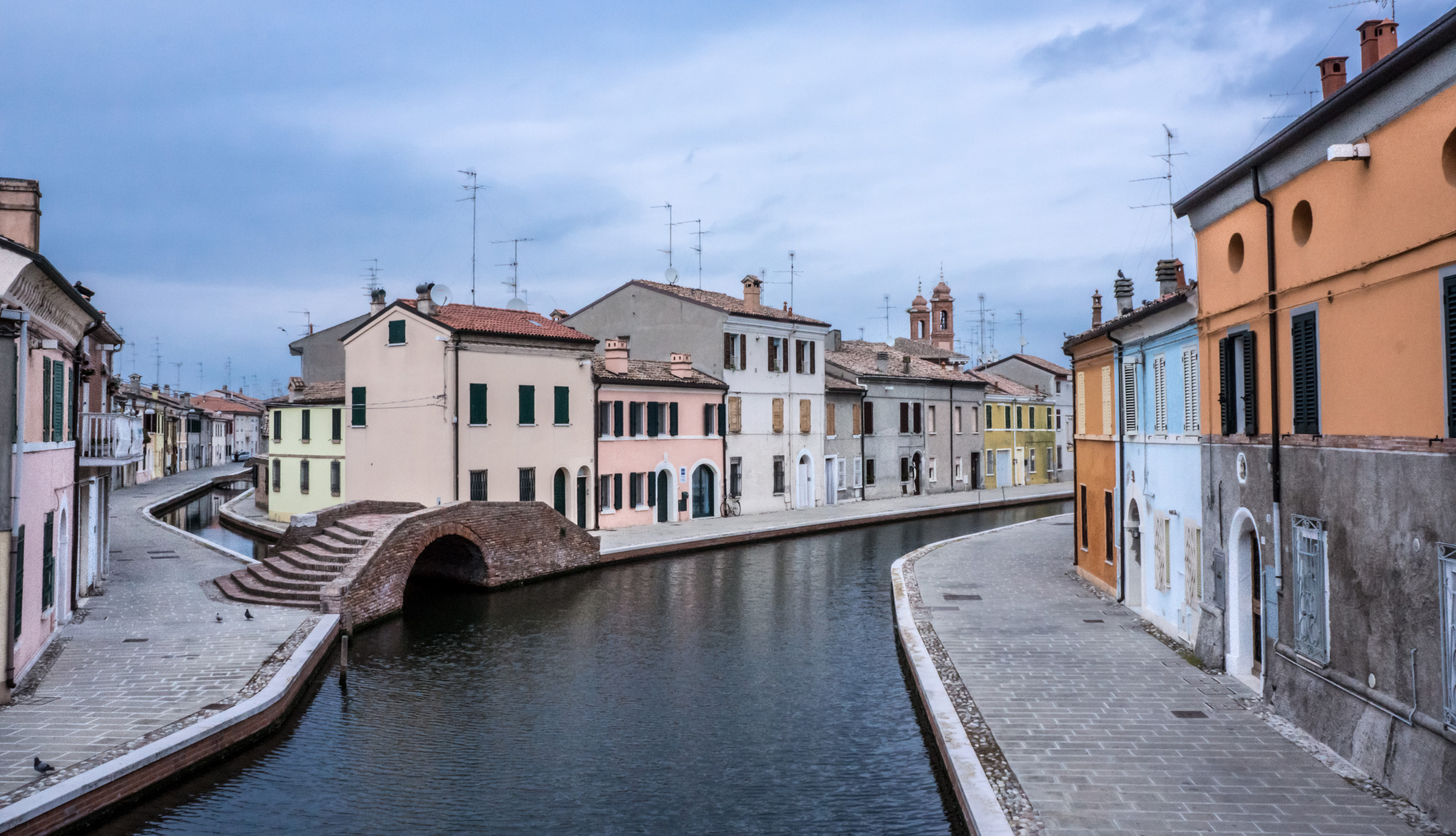
The historic centre of Comacchio with Ponte dei Sisti

After its early occupation by the Etruscans and the Gauls, when the site lay on the main stream of the River Po, Comacchio was annexed by Rome. Under Emperor Augustus, who ruled Rome from 27 BC to AD 14, a canal was dug to deepen its lagoon. Part of the original wetlands were drained and divided among villae rusticae.

Comacchio enjoyed prosperity under the Goths and the Lombards, and became the seat of a Lombard duchy. It owed its fortunes to its salt pans and its strategic importance to its location: when the Lombard king Authari expanded the Lombard dominion at the expense of Byzantium, he took the fortress of Comacchio and cut off communication between Padua and Ravenna. When the Franks descended into northern Italy in 756, their king, Pepin the Short, included Comacchio in his famous donation of land to Pope Stephen II, a grant later confirmed by Pepin's son and successor, Charlemagne. In 854 Comacchio was sacked by their rivals in the salt trade, the Venetians, who laid it waste in 946. Saracen raiders burned the city in 876, but despite this Comacchio slowly recovered. The Holy See later acquired the city and presented it to the archbishopric of Ravenna.

In 1299, Emperor Rudolph I conferred it on Obizzo IV d'Este of Ferrara. In 1508 it became Venetian, but in 1597 was claimed by Clement VIII as a vacant fief. In 1598 the Papal States again acquired Comacchio and retained it until 1866 when it became a part of the Kingdom of Italy. The spread of malaria made the site unhealthy. Since then, most of the swamp land has disappeared, leaving ground for the expansion of agriculture, and creating new zones for dwellings.

The area was the scene of fierce fighting during Operation Roast, which occurred in the last months of the World War II.

Comacchio was formerly the seat of a bishopric and retains its cathedral, now a co-cathedral in the Archdiocese of Ferrara-Comacchio.

The town was once home to a factory for sugar refining, which closed in 1988. Comacchio and its seafront Lidi are a centre for tourism. The town is noted in Italy for its practice of eel-fishing in the nearby wetlands, and many dishes served in Comacchio revolve around eel.

== Main sights ==
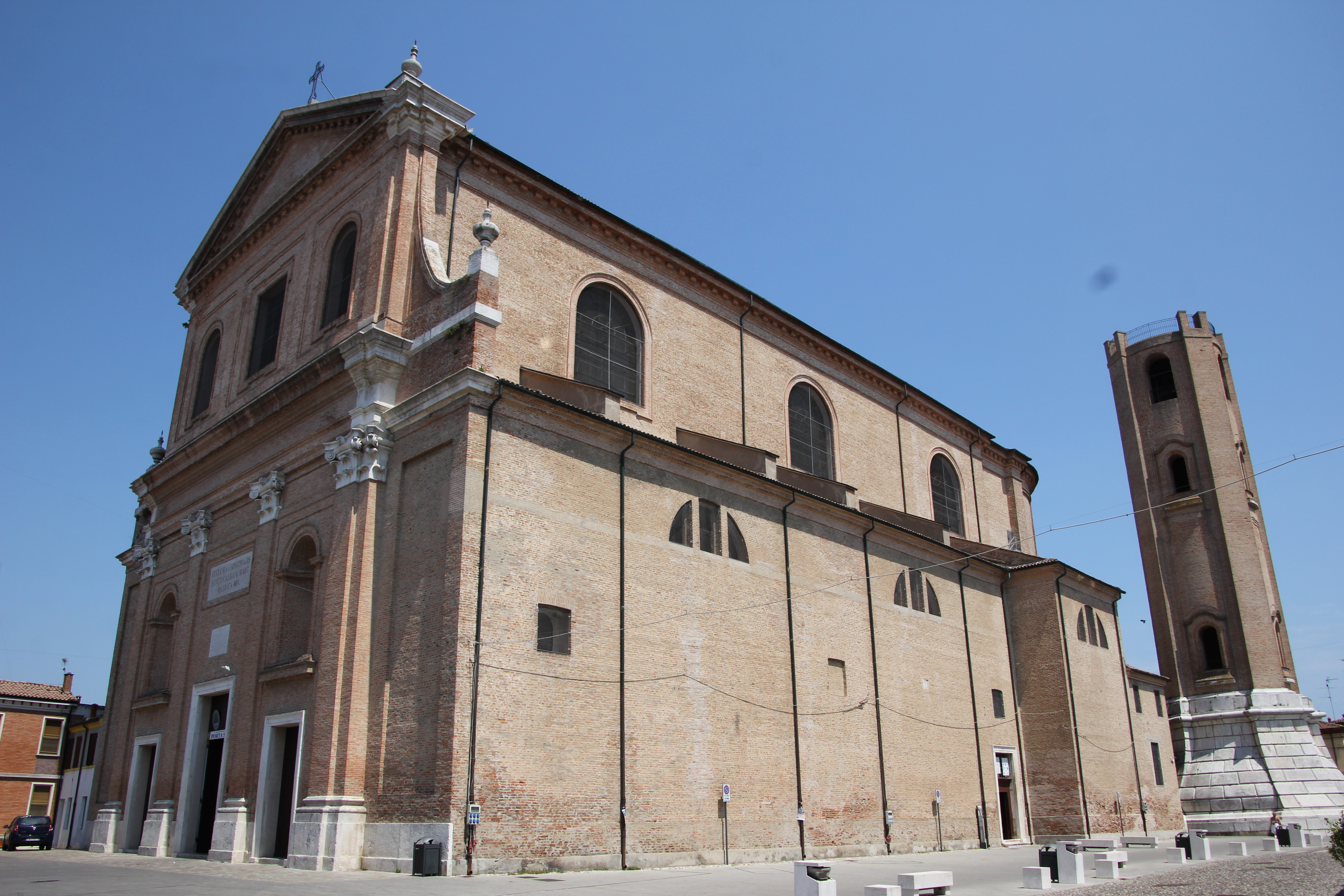
Comacchio's cathedral and bell tower

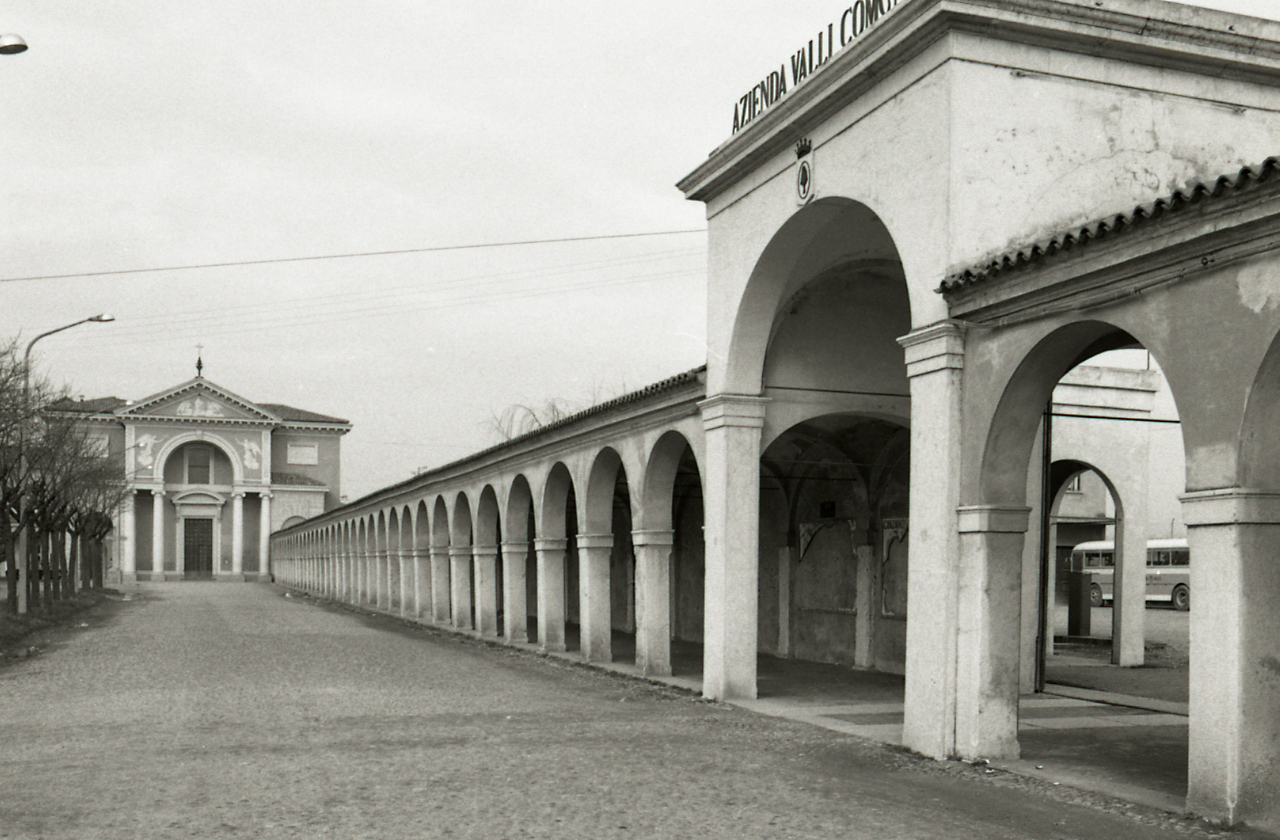
Sanctuary of Santa Maria in Aula Regia and Loggiato dei Cappuccini

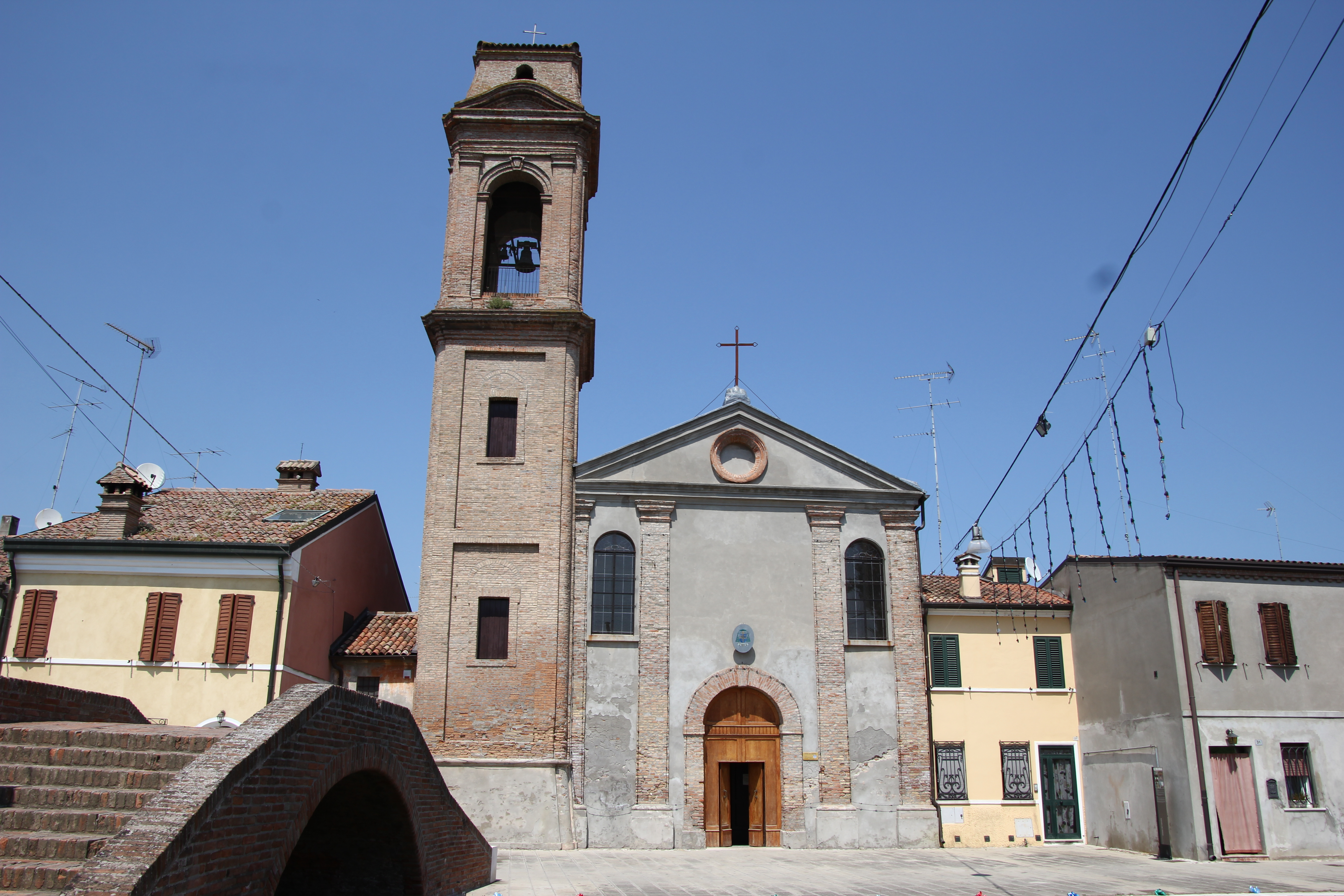
Chiesa del Carmine and Ponte del Carmine in front of it

=== Religious architecture ===
- Comacchio Cathedral (Duomo di Comacchio or Basilica di San Cassiano), dating back to the year 708 and dedicated to Cassian of Imola, originally comprised three naves, while today it has a single nave with twelve side chapels. The most notable artworks in the cathedral are the paintings by Biagio Bevi, the statue of the town's patron Saint Cassian, the wooden crucifix crafted by Germano Cignani in the 17th century and the organ built in 1728 by Gian Domenico Traeri. Adjacent to the cathedral stands the bell tower, designed by the architect Giorgio Fossati: it was built in 1751 but collapsed just a few years later, in 1757. It was later rebuilt and completed only in 1868 on the base of the old bell tower.
- Monastery of Santa Maria in Aula Regia: the current building, built in 1665, replaced the monastery of Santa Maria in Auregario, dated back to the 10th century. Of particular interest is the altarpiece of the high altar, late Renaissance work of a Ferrarese craftsman. The Loggiato dei Cappuccini, a 400 metres long arcade erected in 1647 in front of the building, was commissioned by the cardinal Stefano Donghi and is made up of 143 arches, each supported by a marble column.
- Chiesa del Rosario (Church of the Rosary), built in 1618 by the will of the brotherhood of the Holy Rosary, it has a single nave. Noteworthy artworks are the wooden crucifix by the Venetian Filippo de Porris (1641), the polychrome wooden statue of the Mary (16th century) and many of the 17th century paintings kept inside.
- Chiesa del Carmine, located next to Ponte Pizzetti and in front of Ponte del Carmine, was built at the beginning of the 17th century. It looks like a simple building with a Renaissance style; it has a single nave with a semicircular apse. Noteworthy are the wooden altarpiece and the high altar. In the 1970s, the interior has undergone considerable changes.
- Monastery of Sant'Agostino, probably built between the 6th and the 7th century. Originally a church dedicated to Saint Maurus, it suffered looting during the continuous incursions by the Venetians and Saracens. In 1622, its remains were ceded to the Discalced Augustinians. in 1644 it was dedicated to Saint Augustine. The church were used as a convent, which eventually became a fortress when the Austrian troops seized Comacchio first, between 1708 and 1725, and then the French, until 1813. With the Italian unification, the destination of the building remained unclear until 1928, when the complex was converted to a school after the completion of restoration works.
- Chiesa dei Caduti or Chiesa del Suffragio, located a few meters from the Loggia del Grano, was built in 1644. Noteworthy are the three paintings behind the altar: the central one was painted first by Antonio Randa, while the lateral ones were painted later in 17th century by an unknown author.
- Monastery of Santa Maria in Padovetere, in Valle Pega.

=== Civil architecture ===
The historical residential zone stood on small islands connected to each other: for this reason, the bridges are the defining element of the historic centre of Comacchio.

==== Bridges ====
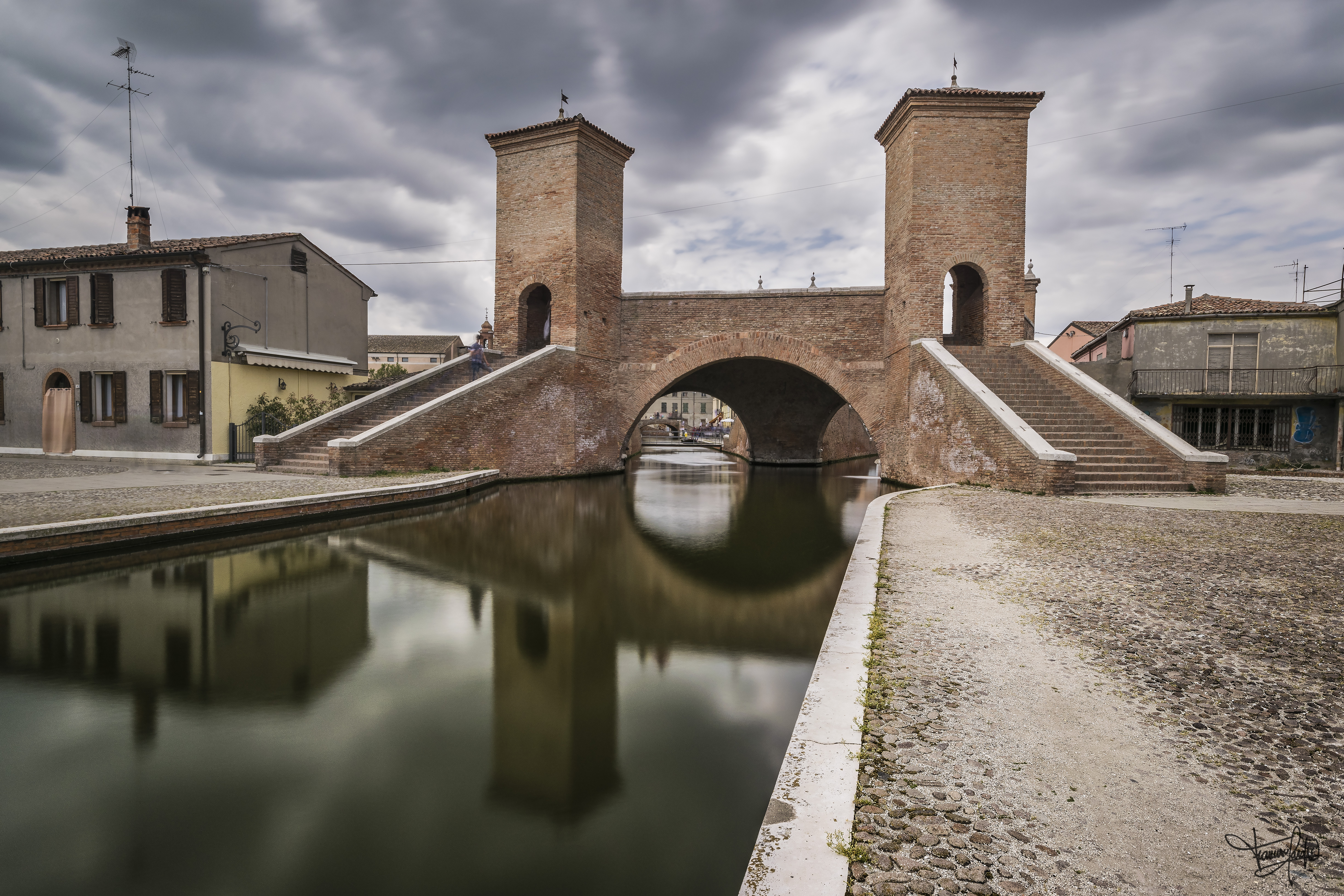
Trepponti bridge

- Ponte dei Trepponti ("Three bridges") or Ponte Pallotta, the symbol of Comacchio, is a bridge consisting of five large staircases (three on the front and two on the rear), culminating in an Istrian stone floor. It was wanted by the cardinal Giovan Battista Pallotta during the so-called "urban rebirth". Designed by Luca Danese of Ravenna in 1634 and built around 1638 by the Capuchin Giovanni Pietro da Lugano, it connects the city center with the navigable canal Pallotta, coming from the sea. It includes five large staircases (three front and two rear) in Istrian stone, built in a round arch.
- Ponte di San Pietro (Saint Peter's bridge), built in the 17th century, marks the beginning of the most antique and characteristic district of Comacchio. It has been completely restored in the recent days.
- Ponte dei Sisti, built in the 18th century entirely with brick, with a single arch.
- Ponte degli Sbirri or Ponte delle Carceri ("Bridge of the cops" or "Bridge of the prisons"), built between 1631 and 1635 and designed by Luca Danese of Ravenna by the will of cardinal Giovan Battista Pallotta, it consists of three arches in brick and Istrian stone. It takes its name from the facing district prison, which once housed the prisoners of Comacchio, mostly poachers or "fiocinini". This bridge constitutes the main canal junction of the city, from which it was possible to sail towards the sea in all directions. The San Pietro district extends southwards from here.
- Ponte del Teatro (Theatre's bridge), built in the 17th century.
- Ponte del Carmine and Ponte Pizzetti, respectively located to the side and in frieze of Chiesa del Carmine, are among the largest in the city—although not the most complex, having a single arch. Both date back to the 18th century; Pizzetti Bridge was recently fully restored.

==== Buildings ====
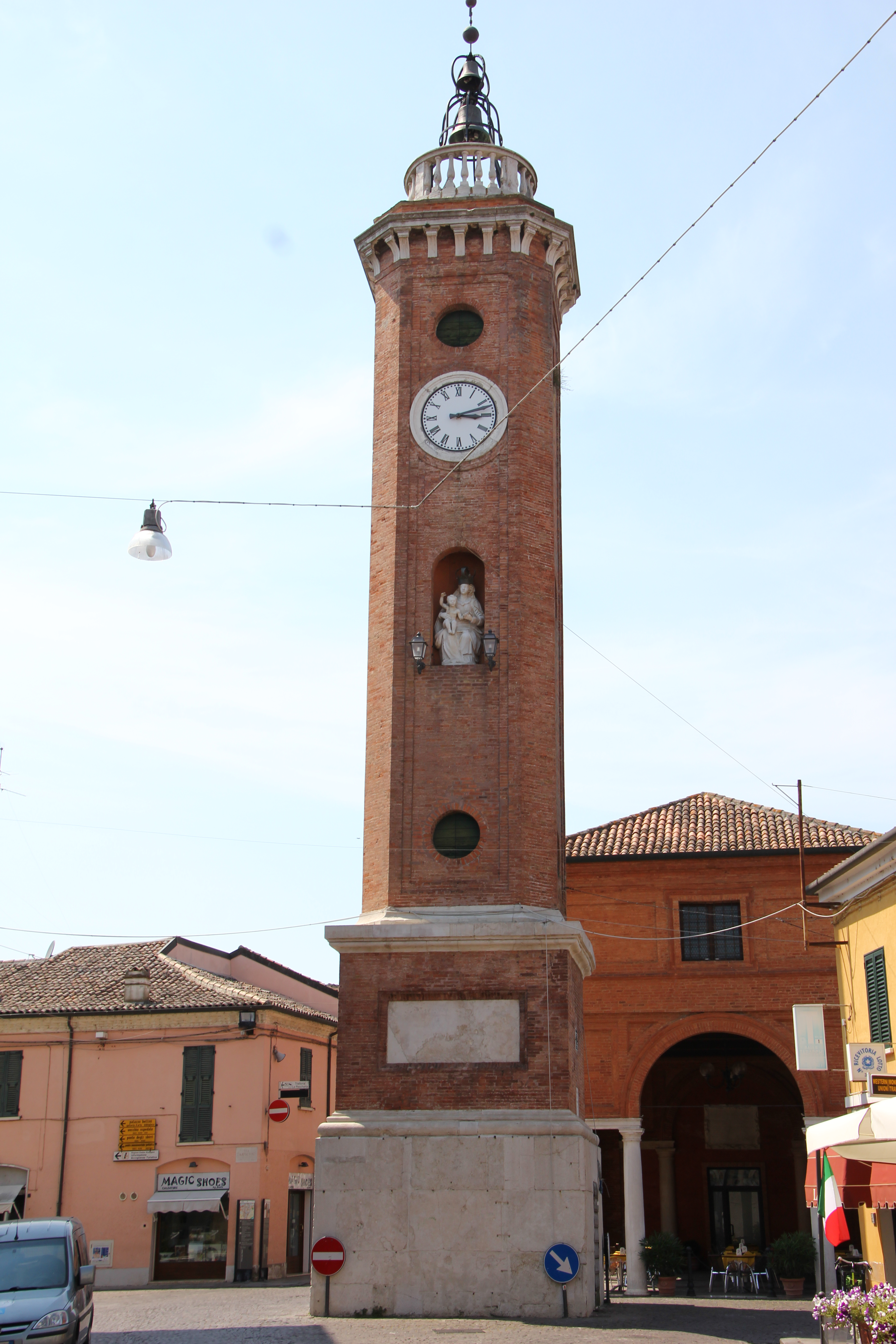
The clock tower.

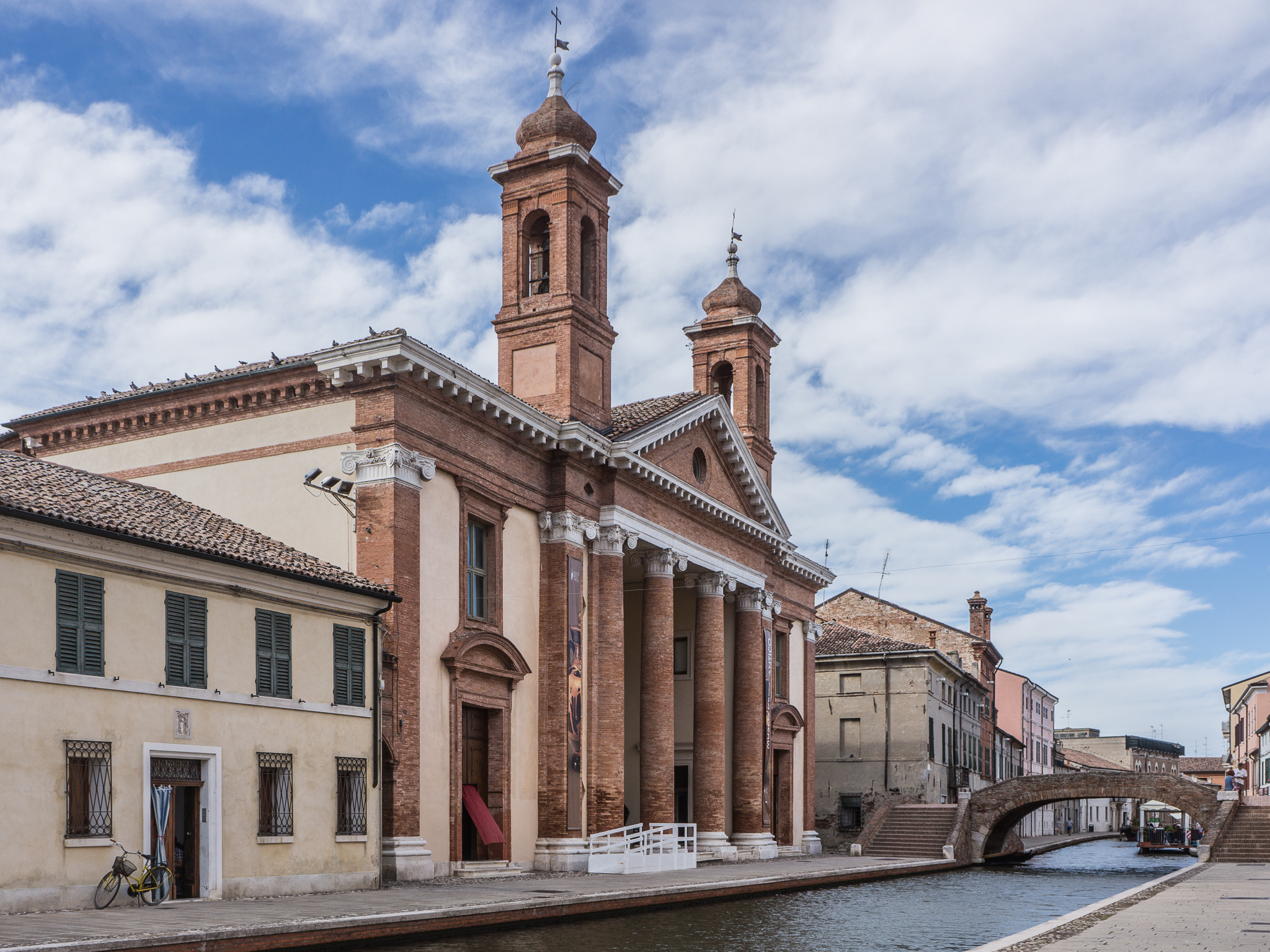
Ospedale degli Infermi, today Delta Antico Museum

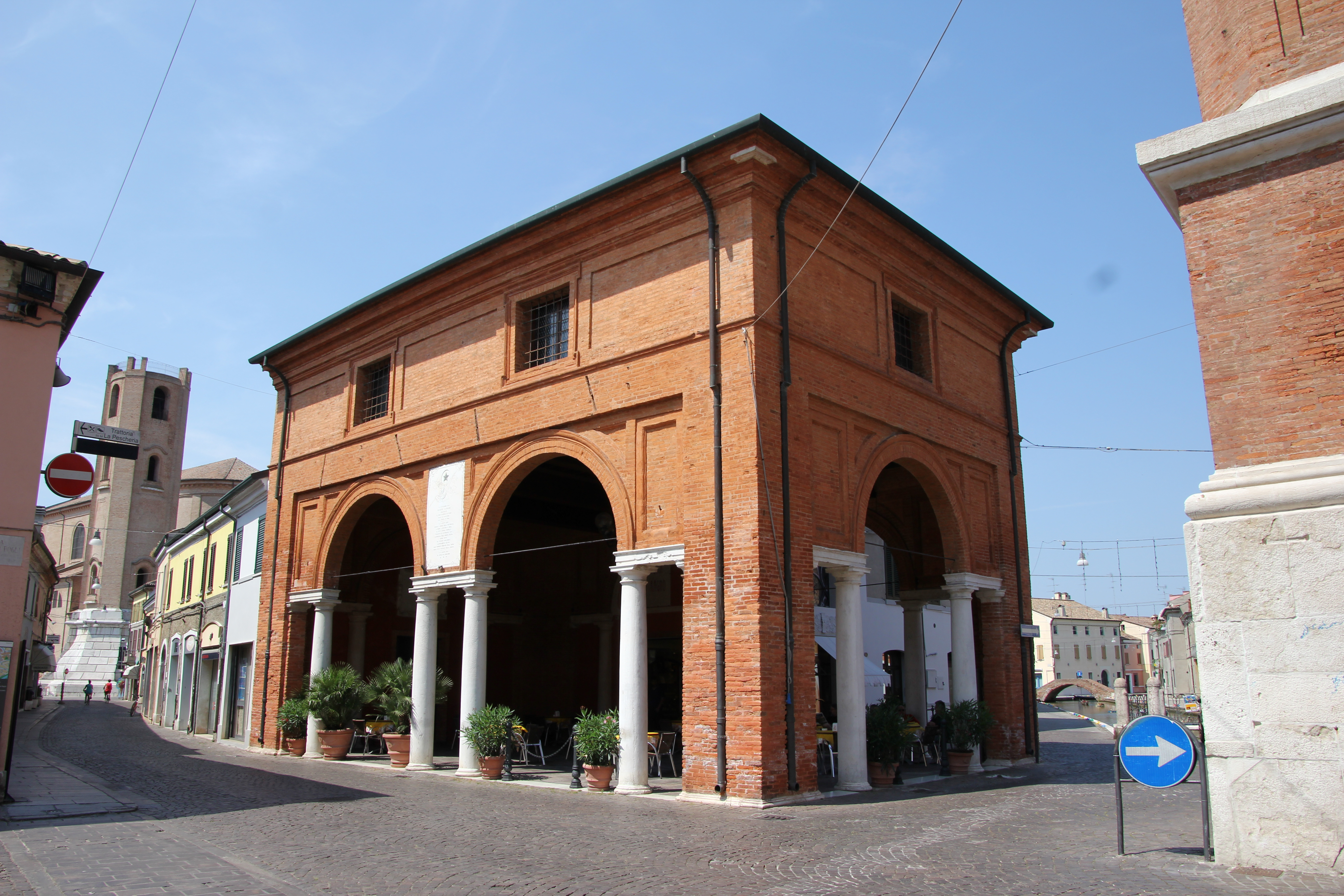
Loggia dei Mercanti del Grano

- Torre civica, or the clock tower, is a reconstruction of the 19th of the original one, dated back to the 14th century, which ruined to the ground in 1816. Since 1872 the tower has been equipped with a mechanical watch.
- Palazzo Bellini is an aristocratic palace built between 1868 and 1870. Today it hosts the Gallery of Contemporary Art, the historical archive, the town's library and offices of the department of cultural institutions.
- Palazzo Patrignani, dating back to the 16th century and restored several times, was inhabited by an eminent family of Comacchio. Findings of an ancient flooring testifies that probably it had been the seat of the old convent of Church of San Nicolò. Today it hosts university courses.
- The antique Ospedale degli Infermi is a neoclassical architecture built between 1778 and 1784 by the will of Pope Clement XIV. The project was assigned to the Venetian architect Antonio Foschini, who designed the facade and the main body of the building. The back was built by the Ferrarese architect Gaetano Genta, who replaced Foschini in 1780 in the works supervision and completed the building. The hospital was inaugurated on 15 May 1811 by a decree of Eugenio Napoleone, viceroy of Italy. The structure remained in operation until the end of the 1970s. Since 2017, it houses the Delta Antico Museum, which keeps a collection of two thousand finds covering a period from the protohistory to the Middle Ages.
- Loggia dei Mercanti del Grano (or Loggia del Grano), built in 1621 by the will of cardinal Giacomo Serra, was used as a grain storehouse for the poor people of Comacchio. It has a rectangular plan and it is supported by marble columns. The monumental Ponte di Piazza used to be in its proximity, but it was demolished after 1850.
- The Episcopal Palace is believed to be built between the late 16th and the early 17th century. The governors of the city used to live there until 1745, when it was sold to the bishop Cristoforo Lugaresi with the commitment to host a seminar and the public school. The bishops of the Diocese of Comacchio have been living there from 1748 to 1986.
- Palazzo Tura, built in 1715 by the abbot Pietro Maria Zanoli and restored by the Tura family, is located in front of the Cathedral. Built with an almost square base, it has a Venetian cotto facade and it spreads over two floors with a central tower. A notable architectural element is the staircase with balustrade in polychrome marble, designed by the Bolognese architect Cellamarini to replace the original one.
- Remo Brindisi Museum at Lido di Spina.

== Anthropic geography ==
=== Resorts ===
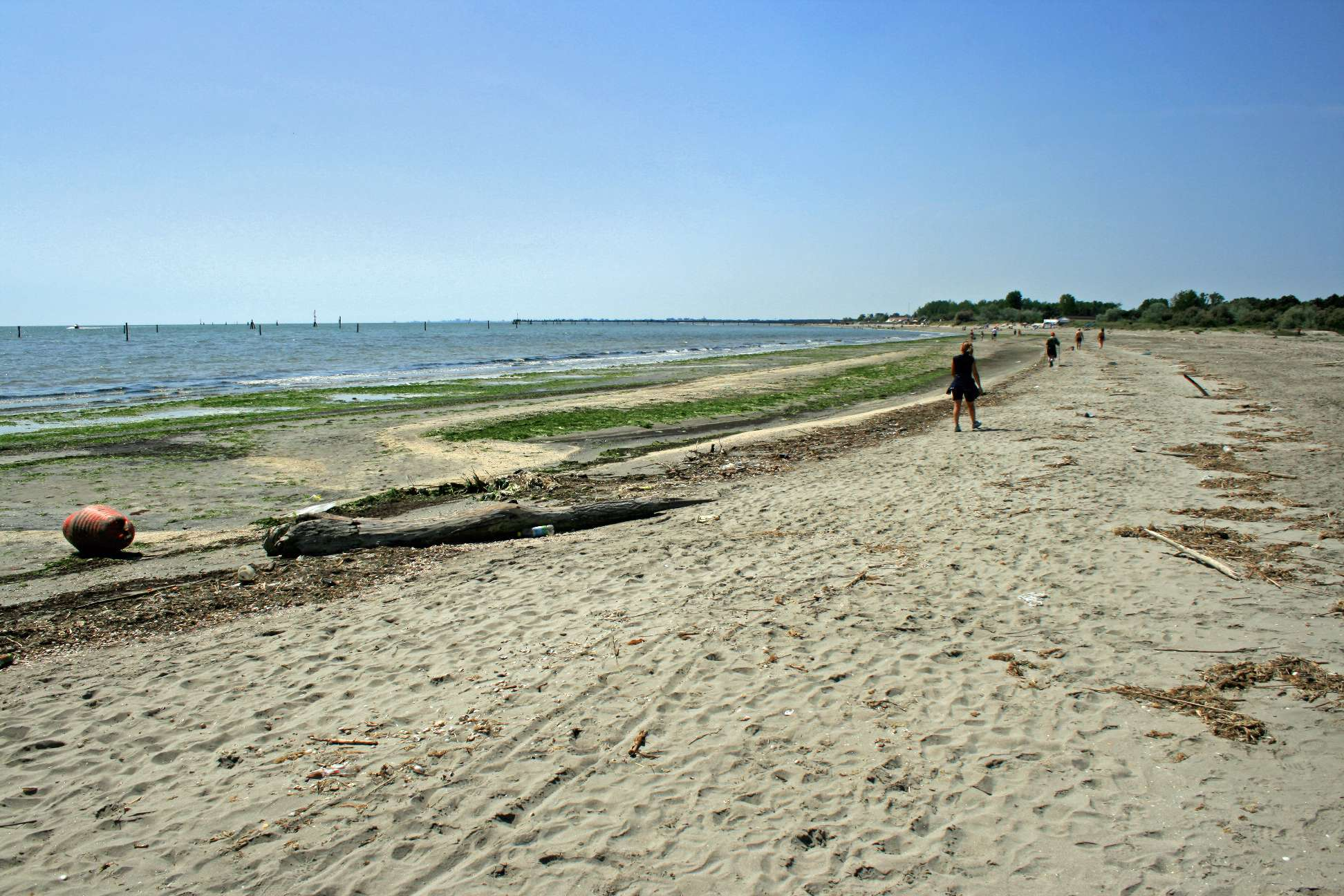
Lido di Volano

Comacchio is known for its seven resorts (Italian: lidos), with its wide sandy shores spreading throughout the coast, from the mouths of the Reno river to the Po di Volano river, crossing the regional park in the Po delta. They are, from north to south:

- Lido di Volano
- Lido delle Nazioni
- Lido di Pomposa
- Lido degli Scacchi
- Porto Garibaldi
- Lido degli Estensi
- Lido di Spina

The oldest of them is Porto Garibaldi; the most recently established is Lido di Volano.

== Economy ==
Tourism is one of the main activities in its seven lidos, especially during summer. Other prominent activities are commercial fishing, aquaculture and fish farming. In the past, salt production was also very important, whose trade had been causing bitter disputes with the Serenissima Republic of Venice.

Comacchio is appreciated for having kept intact most of its architecture over time: canals, ancient buildings and monumental bridges are elements that give it the typical appearance of the northern lagoon cities (for example, Chioggia and other cities of the Venetian lagoon). For this reason, it is also known as the Little Venice.

== See also ==
- National Archaeological Museum of Ferrara
- Roman Catholic Archdiocese of Ferrara-Comacchio
