= Vecchi =

Vecchi is an Italian surname. Notable people with this surname include:

- Orazio Vecchi (1550-1605), Italian composer and choirmaster
- Alessandro Vecchi (born 1991), Italian footballer
- Augusto Vittorio Vecchi (1842-1932), Italian naval officer and author
- Irene Vecchi (born 1989), Italian sabre fencer
- Eligio Vecchi (1910-1968), Italian professional football player
- Giovanni Vecchi, Italian general in the Royal Italian Army
- Juan Edmundo Vecchi (1931-2002), Italian Roman Catholic Priest
- Luca Vecchi (born 1972), Italian politician
- Mario Vecchi (born 1957), Italian judoka
- Natale Vecchi (1917–1988), Italian wrestler
- Paolo Vecchi (born 1959), Italian former volleyball player
- Stefano Vecchi (born 1971), Italian professional footballer turned coach
- Villiam Vecchi (1948–2022), Italian former football goalkeeper

== Other ==
- Vecchi Editore
- Vecchi Ketchup Factory

== See also ==
- De Vecchi
- De Vecchis
- Vecchio
