= Hector de Monte =

Italian Roman Catholic prelate

Most Reverend Hector de Monte
- Bishop of Termoli
- Church: Catholic Church
- Diocese: Diocese of Termoli
- In office: 1626
- Predecessor: Camillo Moro
- Successor: Gerolamo Cappello

Orders
- Consecration: 25 March 1626 by Alphonse Sacrati

Personal details
- Born: 1575 Lanciano, Italy
- Died: July 1626 (age 51) Termoli, Italy

Hector de Monte (1575 – July 1626) was a Roman Catholic prelate who served as Bishop of Termoli (1626).

== Biography ==
Hector de Monte was born in Lanciano, Italy in 1575. On 16 March 1626, he was appointed during the papacy of Pope Urban VIII as Bishop of Termoli. On 25 March 1626, he was consecrated bishop by Alphonse Sacrati, Bishop Emeritus of Comacchio, with Maurizio Centini, Bishop of Massa Lubrense, and Giovanni Delfino, Bishop of Belluno, serving as co-consecrators. He served as Bishop of Termoli until his death in July 1626.

== External links and additional sources ==
- Cheney, David M. "Diocese of Termoli-Larino". Catholic-Hierarchy.org. (Chronology of Bishops) ^{[self-published]}
- Chow, Gabriel. "Diocese of Termoli-Larino (Italy)". GCatholic.org. (Chronology of Bishops) ^{[self-published]}

Catholic Church titles
Preceded by Camillo Moro	Bishop of Termoli; 1626	Succeeded by Gerolamo Cappello
