= Didier Palleti =

17th-century Roman Catholic bishop

Most Reverend Didier Palleti
- Bishop of Nice
- Church: Catholic Church
- Diocese: Bishop of Nice
- In office: 1644–1658
- Predecessor: Giacomo Marenco
- Successor: Giacinto Solaro di Moretta

Orders
- Consecration: 18 Dec 1644 by Marcantonio Franciotti

Personal details
- Born: 1587 Verceil, France
- Died: 18 Sep 1658 (age 71)

Didier Palleti, C.R.L. (1587–1658) was a Roman Catholic prelate who served as Bishop of Nice (1644–1658).

== Biography ==
Didier Palleti was born in 1587 in Verceil, France and ordained a priest in the Canons Regular of the Lateran. On 28 Nov 1644, he was appointed during the papacy of Pope Innocent X as Bishop of Nice. On 18 Dec 1644, he was consecrated bishop by Marcantonio Franciotti, Bishop of Lucca, with Alfonso Pandolfi, Bishop of Comacchio, and Gregorio Panzani, Bishop of Mileto, with serving as co-consecrators. He served as Bishop of Nice until his death on 18 Sep 1658.

== External links and additional sources ==
- Cheney, David M. "Diocese of Nice". Catholic-Hierarchy.org. (for Chronology of Bishops) ^{[self-published]}
- Chow, Gabriel. "Diocese of Nice (France)". GCatholic.org. (for Chronology of Bishops) ^{[self-published]}

Catholic Church titles
Preceded by Giacomo Marenco	Bishop of Nice; 1644–1658	Succeeded by Giacinto Solaro di Moretta
