= Cherubino Manzoni =

Italian Roman Catholic prelate (1595–1651)

Most Reverend Cherubino Manzoni
- Bishop of Termoli
- Church: Catholic Church
- Diocese: Diocese of Termoli
- In office: 1644–1651
- Predecessor: Alessandro Crescenzi (cardinal)
- Successor: Antonio Leoncello

Orders
- Consecration: 26 August 1635 by Francesco Maria Brancaccio

Personal details
- Born: 1595 Naples, Italy
- Died: 1651 (age 56) Termoli, Italy

Cherubino Manzoni, O.F.M. (1595–1651) was a Roman Catholic prelate who served as Bishop of Termoli (1644–1651) and Bishop of Lavello (1635–1644).

== Biography ==
Cherubino Manzoni was born in Naples, Italy in 1595 and ordained a priest in the Order of Friars Minor. On 9 July 1635, he was appointed during the papacy of Pope Urban VIII as Bishop of Lavello. On 26 August 1635, he was consecrated bishop by Francesco Maria Brancaccio, Cardinal-Priest of Santi XII Apostoli, with Alessandro Suardi, Bishop of Lucera, and Sigismondo Taddei, Bishop of Bitetto, serving as co-consecrators. On 13 July 1644, he was appointed during the papacy of Pope Urban VIII as Bishop of Termoli. He served as Bishop of Termoli until his death in 1651.

== External links and additional sources ==
- Cheney, David M. "Diocese of Lavello". Catholic-Hierarchy.org. (Chronology of Bishops) ^{[self-published]}
- Chow, Gabriel. "Titular Episcopal See of Lavello". GCatholic.org. (Chronology of Bishops) ^{[self-published]}
- Cheney, David M. "Diocese of Termoli-Larino". Catholic-Hierarchy.org. (Chronology of Bishops) ^{[self-published]}
- Chow, Gabriel. "Diocese of Termoli-Larino (Italy)". GCatholic.org. (Chronology of Bishops) ^{[self-published]}

Catholic Church titles
Preceded by Placido Padiglia	Bishop of Lavello; 1635–1644	Succeeded by Francesco de' Notari
Preceded by Alessandro Crescenzi (cardinal)	Bishop of Termoli; 1644–1651	Succeeded by Antonio Leoncello
