= Gerolamo Cappello =

Historical figure

Most Reverend Gerolamo Cappello
- Bishop of Termoli
- Church: Catholic Church
- Diocese: Diocese of Termoli
- In office: 1626–1643
- Predecessor: Hector de Monte
- Successor: Alessandro Crescenzi (cardinal)

Orders
- Consecration: 30 November 1626 by Marcello Lante della Rovere

Personal details
- Died: 1643 Termoli, Italy

Gerolamo Cappello, O.F.M. Conv. (died 1643) was a Roman Catholic prelate who served as Bishop of Termoli (1626–1643).

== Biography ==
Gerolamo Cappello ordained a priest in the Order of Friars Minor Conventual. On 26 November 1626, he was appointed during the papacy of Pope Urban VIII as Bishop of Termoli. On 30 November 1626, he was consecrated bishop by Marcello Lante della Rovere, Cardinal-Priest of Santi Quirico e Giulitta, with Fabrizio Caracciolo Piscizi, Bishop of Catanzaro, and Giovanni Battista Altieri, Bishop of Camerino, serving as co-consecrators. He served as Bishop of Termoli until his death in 1643.

== See also ==
- Catholic Church in Italy

== External links and additional sources ==
- Cheney, David M. "Diocese of Termoli-Larino". Catholic-Hierarchy.org. (Chronology of Bishops) ^{[self-published]}
- Chow, Gabriel. "Diocese of Termoli-Larino (Italy)". GCatholic.org. (Chronology of Bishops) ^{[self-published]}

Catholic Church titles
Preceded by Hector de Monte	Bishop of Termoli; 1626–1643	Succeeded by Alessandro Crescenzi (cardinal)
