= Camillo Moro =

Roman Catholic prelate

Most Reverend Camillo Moro
- Bishop of Comacchio
- Church: Catholic Church
- Diocese: Diocese of Comacchio
- In office: 1626–1630
- Predecessor: Alfonso Sacrati
- Successor: Alfonso Pandolfi
- Previous post: Bishop of Termoli (1612–1630)

Orders
- Consecration: 8 December 1612

Personal details
- Died: 10 May 1630

Camillo Moro (died 1630) was a Roman Catholic prelate who served as Bishop of Comacchio (1626–1630) and Bishop of Termoli (1612–1630).

== Biography ==
On 3 December 1612, Camillo Moro was appointed during the papacy of Pope Paul V as Bishop of Termoli. On 8 December 1612, he was consecrated bishop by Giambattista Leni, Bishop of Ferrara, with Ottavio Ridolfi, Bishop of Ariano, and Ennio Filonardi, Bishop of Ferentino, serving as co-consecrators. On 2 March 1626, he was appointed during the papacy of Pope Urban VIII as Bishop of Comacchio, and served in this position until his death on 10 May 1630.

== External links and additional sources ==
- Cheney, David M. "Diocese of Termoli-Larino". Catholic-Hierarchy.org. (Chronology of Bishops) ^{[self-published]}
- Chow, Gabriel. "Diocese of Termoli-Larino (Italy)". GCatholic.org. (Chronology of Bishops) ^{[self-published]}
- Cheney, David M. "Diocese of Comacchio (-Pomposa)". Catholic-Hierarchy.org. (for Chronology of Bishops) ^{[self-published]}
- Chow, Gabriel. "Diocese of Comacchio". GCatholic.org. (for Chronology of Bishops) ^{[self-published]}

Catholic Church titles
Preceded by Federico Mezio	Bishop of Termoli; 1612–1630	Succeeded by Hector de Monte
Preceded by Alfonso Sacrati	Bishop of Comacchio; 1626–1630	Succeeded by Alfonso Pandolfi
