= Alberto Drago =

Italian Roman Catholic prelate (died 1601)

Most Reverend Alberto Drago
- Bishop of Termoli
- Church: Catholic Church
- Diocese: Diocese of Termoli
- In office: 1599–1601
- Predecessor: Francesco Scotti (bishop)
- Successor: Federico Mezio

Orders
- Consecration: 19 December 1599 by Giulio Antonio Santorio

Personal details
- Died: 3 January 1601 Termoli, Italy

Alberto Drago, O.P. (died 3 January 1601) was a Roman Catholic prelate who served as Bishop of Termoli (1599–1601).

== Biography ==
Alberto Drago was ordained a priest in the Order of Preachers.

On 29 November 1599, he was appointed Bishop of Termoli by Pope Clement VIII. On 19 December 1599, he was consecrated bishop by Giulio Antonio Santorio, Cardinal-Bishop of Palestrina, with Metello Bichi, Bishop of Sovana, and Benedetto Mandina, Bishop of Caserta, serving as co-consecrators.

He served as Bishop of Termoli until his death on 3 January 1601.

== External links and additional sources ==
- Cheney, David M. "Diocese of Termoli-Larino". Catholic-Hierarchy.org. (Chronology of Bishops) ^{[self-published]}
- Chow, Gabriel. "Diocese of Termoli-Larino (Italy)". GCatholic.org. (Chronology of Bishops) ^{[self-published]}

Catholic Church titles
Preceded by Francesco Scotti (bishop)	Bishop of Termoli; 1599–1601	Succeeded by Federico Mezio
