= St. Bassus's Church =

Church in Koper, Slovenia

Coordinates: 45°32′42.49″N 13°43′48.67″E

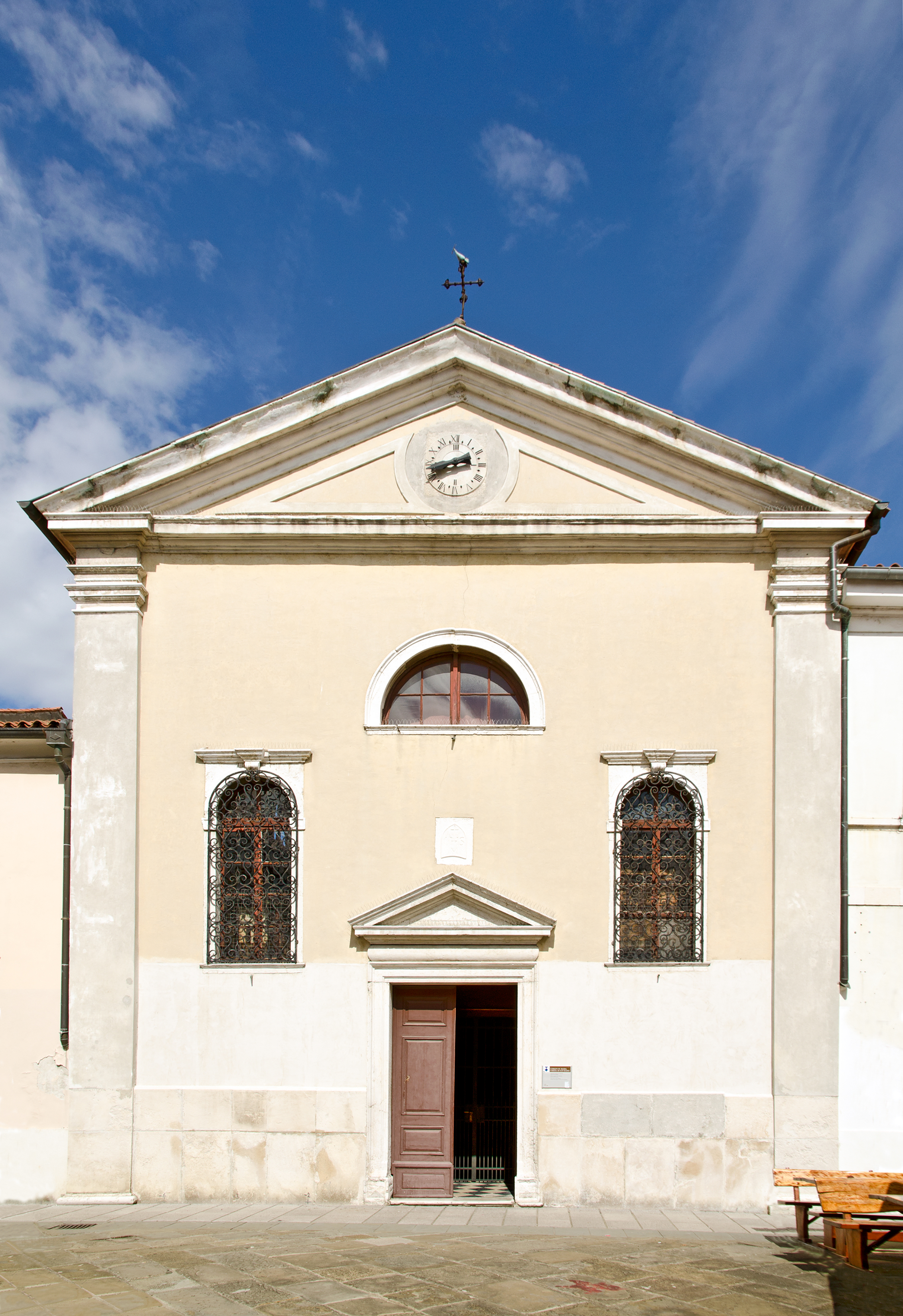
Exterior

St. Bassus's Church (Slovene: cerkev svetega Basa; Italian: chiesa di San Basso) is a church on Prešeren Square (Prešernov trg; Italian: piazza Prešeren) in Koper, a port town in southwestern Slovenia. It has the function of a chapel of the Parish of Koper–Assumption of Mary (the cathedral parish). The building, which dates from the end of the 16th century, at first served as a hospital of St. Nazarius and was consecrated as a church by Koper Bishop Paolo Naldini in 1706. It was significantly rebuilt in 1731. It has a Baroque interior with a single nave and a flat ceiling. The rich Baroque interior furnishings include the main altar with images of St. Nazarius and St. Bassus, a statue of St. Bassus in the vestry, and a Romanesque crucifix from about 1120, later Gothicised, that was believed to have miraculous powers (Italian: Crocifisso miracoloso). It is made of polychrome wood and depicts a triumphant Christ.
