= Leone Strozzi (bishop) =

17th-century Italian Catholic bishop

Most Reverend Leone Strozzi
- Archbishop of Florence
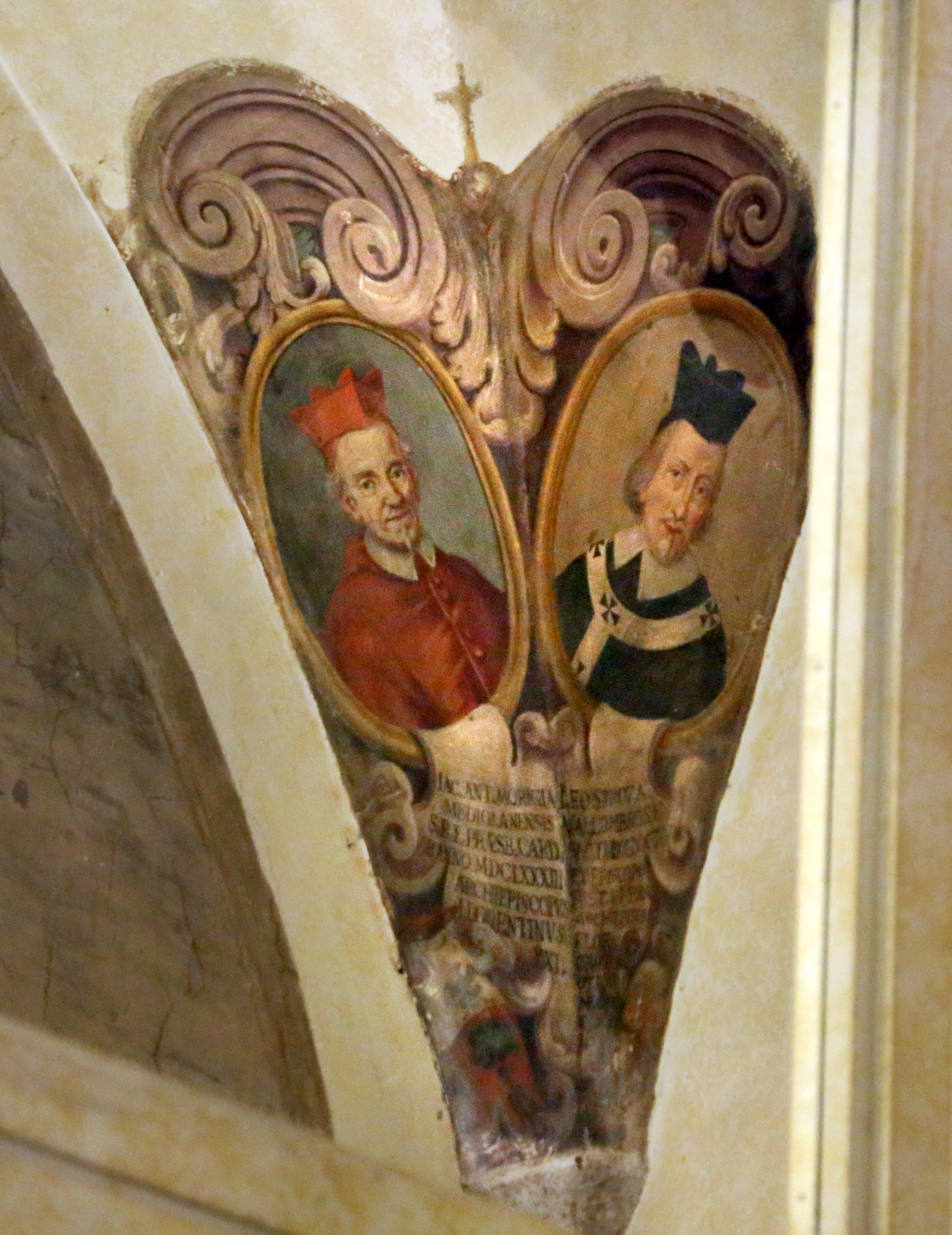
- Leone Strozzi (archbishop) on the right
- Church: Catholic Church
- Archdiocese: Archdiocese of Florence
- In office: 1700–1703
- Predecessor: Giacomo Antonio Morigia
- Successor: Tommaso Bonaventura della Gherardesca
- Previous post: Bishop of Pistoia e Prato (1690–1700)

Orders
- Consecration: 6 August 1690 by Paluzzo Paluzzi Altieri Degli Albertoni

Personal details
- Born: 1638 Florence, Grand Duchy of Tuscany
- Died: 4 October 1703 (age 65) Florence, Grand Duchy of Tuscany

Leone Strozzi, O.S.B. (1638–1703) was a Roman Catholic prelate who served as Archbishop of Florence (1700–1703) and Bishop of Pistoia e Prato (1690–1700).

== Biography ==
Leone Strozzi was born in Florence, Italy in 1638 and ordained a priest in the Order of Saint Benedict. On 10 July 1690, he was appointed during the papacy of Pope Alexander VIII as Bishop of Pistoia e Prato. On 6 August 1690, he was consecrated bishop by Paluzzo Paluzzi Altieri Degli Albertoni, Cardinal-Bishop of Sabina, with Prospero Bottini, Titular Archbishop of Myra, and Nicolò d'Arcano, Bishop of Comacchio, serving as co-consecrators. On 21 June 1700, he was appointed during the papacy of List of popes as Archbishop of Florence. He served as Archbishop of Florence until his death on 4 October 1703.

Catholic Church titles
Preceded by Gherardo Gherardi	Bishop of Pistoia e Prato; 1690–1700	Succeeded by Francesco Frosini
Preceded by Giacomo Antonio Morigia	Archbishop of Florence; 1700–1703	Succeeded by Tommaso Bonaventura della Gherardesca
