= Alfonso Sacrati =

Italian Roman Catholic prelate

Most Reverend Alfonso Sacrati
- Bishop Emeritus of Comacchio
- Church: Catholic Church
- Diocese: Diocese of Comacchio
- In office: 1617–1626
- Predecessor: Orazio Giraldi
- Successor: Camillo Moro

Orders
- Consecration: 10 September 1617 by Giambattista Leni

Personal details
- Born: 1585
- Died: 14 September 1647 (age 62)

Alfonso Sacrati or Alphonse Sacrati (1585–1647) was a Roman Catholic prelate who served as Apostolic Nuncio to Switzerland (1646–1647), Vicegerent of Rome (1643–1646), and Bishop of Comacchio (1617–1626).

== Biography ==
Alfonso Sacrati was born in 1585. He is the brother of Cardinal Francesco Sacrati and nephew of Ercole Sacrati, Bishop of Comacchio. On 12 June 1617, he was appointed during the papacy of Pope Paul V as Bishop of Comacchio. On 10 September 1617, he was consecrated bishop by Giambattista Leni, Bishop of Ferrara, with Francesco Sacrati (cardinal), Titular Archbishop of Damascus, and Evangelista Tornioli, Bishop of Città di Castello, serving as co-consecrators. In 1626, he resigned as Bishop of Comacchio. On 27 March 1643, he was appointed during the papacy of Pope Urban VIII as Vicegerent of Rome; he resigned on 20 Oct 1646. On 7 November 1646, he was appointed during the papacy of Pope Innocent X as Apostolic Nuncio to Switzerland. He served as Apostolic Nuncio to Switzerland until his death on 14 September 1647.

== Episcopal succession ==
Episcopal succession of Alfonso Sacrati

While bishop, he was the principal consecrator of:

- Hector de Monte, Bishop of Termoli.

and the principal co-consecrator of:

- Francesco Cavaliere, Bishop of Valva e Sulmona (1621);
- Niccolò Sacchetti, Bishop of Volterra (1634);
- Girolamo Grimaldi-Cavalleroni, Titular Archbishop of Seleucia in Isauria (1641);
- Franz Johann von Vogt von Altensumerau und Prasberg, Titular Bishop of Megara and Auxiliary Bishop of Konstanz (1641);
- Marco Antonio Tomati, Bishop of Bitetto (1641);
- Alessandro Pauli, Bishop of Vico Equense (1643);
- Antonio Montecatini, Bishop of Foligno (1643);
- Alessandro Salzilla, Bishop of Trevico (1643);
- Giacomo Raimondi, Bishop of Melfi e Rapolla (1644);
- Francesco de' Notari, Bishop of Lavello (1644);
- Bernard Pinelli, Archbishop of Avignon (1644);
- Giovanni Tommaso Venetiani, Bishop of Troia (1645);
- Aniello Campagna, Bishop of Nusco (1645);
- Girolamo Codebò, Bishop of Montalto delle Marche (1645);
- Michel Mazarin, Archbishop of Aix (1645);
- Giovanni Battista Aresti de Dovara, Archbishop of Aleppo (1645);
- Donato Pascasio, Bishop of Trevico (1646);
- Bonaventura Claverio, Bishop of Potenza (1646);
- Louis de Fortia-Montréal, Bishop of Cavaillon (1646);
- Martino Megali, Bishop of Bova (1646); and
- Giacomo Carafa, Archbishop of Rossano (1646).

== External links and additional sources ==
- Cheney, David M. "Diocese of Comacchio (-Pomposa)". Catholic-Hierarchy.org. (for Chronology of Bishops) ^{[self-published]}
- Chow, Gabriel. "Diocese of Comacchio". GCatholic.org. (for Chronology of Bishops) ^{[self-published]}
- Cheney, David M. "Diocese of Roma {Rome}". Catholic-Hierarchy.org. (for Chronology of Bishops) ^{[self-published]}
- Cheney, David M. "Nunciature to Switzerland". Catholic-Hierarchy.org. (for Chronology of Bishops) ^{[self-published]}
- Chow, Gabriel. "Apostolic Nunciature Switzerland". GCatholic.org. (for Chronology of Bishops) ^{[self-published]}

Catholic Church titles
Preceded by Orazio Giraldi	Bishop of Comacchio; 1617–1626	Succeeded by Camillo Moro
Preceded by Giulio Cesare Sacchetti	Vicegerent of Rome; 1643–1646	Succeeded by Giulio Salimei
Preceded by Lorenzo Gavotti	Apostolic Nuncio to Switzerland; 1646–1647	Succeeded by Francesco Boccapaduli
