= Carlo Mannello =

17th-century Roman Catholic bishop

Most Reverend Carlo Mannello
- Bishop of Termoli
- Church: Catholic Church
- Diocese: Diocese of Termoli
- In office: 1653–1662
- Predecessor: Antonio Leoncillo
- Successor: Fabrizio Maracchi

Personal details
- Born: 1618 Aversa, Italy
- Died: Unknown

Carlo Mannello (Latin: Carolus Mannellus) (born 1618) was a Roman Catholic prelate who served as Bishop of Termoli (1653–1662).

== Biography ==
Carlo Mannello was born in 1618 in Aversa, Italy. On 3 Feb 1653, he was appointed during the papacy of Pope Innocent X as Bishop of Termoli. He served as Bishop of Termoli until his resignation in 1662.

== External links and additional sources ==
- Cheney, David M. "Diocese of Termoli-Larino". Catholic-Hierarchy.org. (Chronology of Bishops) ^{[self-published]}
- Chow, Gabriel. "Diocese of Termoli-Larino (Italy)". GCatholic.org. (Chronology of Bishops) ^{[self-published]}

Catholic Church titles
| Preceded by Antonio Leoncillo | Bishop of Termoli; 1653–1662 | Succeeded by Fabrizio Maracchi |
