= De Vecchi =

De Vecchi is a surname of Italian origin. Notable people with this surname include:

- Carlo de' Vecchi (1611-1673), Roman Catholic Titular Archbishop of Athenae and Bishop of Chiusi
- Cesare Maria De Vecchi (1884-1959), Italian Fascist politician
- Giovanni de' Vecchi (bishop) (died 1509), Roman Catholic Bishop of Termoli
- Giovanni de' Vecchi (1536-1614), Italian painter of the Renaissance period
- Giovanni Antonio de' Vecchi (died 1672), Roman Catholic prelate Bishop of Ischia
- Arturo De Vecchi (1898-1988), Italian fencer
- Renzo De Vecchi (1894-1967), Italian football player and coach
- Robert P. DeVecchi (1930-2015), American academic

== See also ==
- Vecchi
