= Giovanni de' Vecchi (bishop) =

Most Reverend Giovanni de’ Vecchi
- Bishop of Termoli
- Church: Catholic Church
- Diocese: Diocese of Termoli-Larino
- In office: 1497–1509
- Successor: Angelo Antonio Guiliani

Personal details
- Died: 1509 Termoli, Italy

Giovanni de' Vecchi (died 1509) was a Roman Catholic prelate who served as Bishop of Termoli (1497–1509).

== Biography ==
On January 9, 1497, Giovanni de' Vecchi was appointed during the papacy of Pope Alexander VI as Bishop of Termoli. He served as Bishop of Termoli until his death in 1509.

== External links and additional sources ==
- Cheney, David M. "Diocese of Termoli-Larino". Catholic-Hierarchy.org. (Chronology of Bishops) ^{[self-published]}
- Chow, Gabriel. "Diocese of Termoli-Larino (Italy)". GCatholic.org. (Chronology of Bishops) ^{[self-published]}

Catholic Church titles
| Preceded by | Bishop of Termoli; 1497–1509 | Succeeded by Angelo Antonio Guiliani |
