= Fabrizio Maracchi =

17th-century Roman Catholic bishop

Most Reverend Fabrizio Maracchi
- Bishop of Termoli
- Church: Catholic Church
- Diocese: Diocese of Termoli
- In office: 1662–1676
- Predecessor: Carlo Mannello
- Successor: Antonio Savo de' Panicoli

Personal details
- Born: 1618 Pontremoli, Italy
- Died: August 1676 (age 58)

Fabrizio Maracchi (Latin: Fabritius Maracchius; 1618 – August 1676) was a Roman Catholic prelate who served as Bishop of Termoli (1662–1676).

He was born in 1618 in Pontremoli, Italy. On 13 Feb 1662, he was appointed during the papacy of Pope Alexander VII as Bishop of Termoli. He served as Bishop of Termoli until his death in August 1676.

== External links and additional sources ==
- Cheney, David M. "Diocese of Termoli-Larino". Catholic-Hierarchy.org. (Chronology of Bishops) ^{[self-published]}
- Chow, Gabriel. "Diocese of Termoli-Larino (Italy)". GCatholic.org. (Chronology of Bishops) ^{[self-published]}

Catholic Church titles
Preceded by Carlo Mannello	Bishop of Termoli; 1662–1676	Succeeded by Antonio Savo de' Panicoli
