= Antonio Leoncillo =

17th-century Roman Catholic bishop

Most Reverend Antonio Leoncillo
- Bishop of Termoli
- Church: Catholic Church
- Diocese: Diocese of Termoli
- In office: 1651–1653
- Predecessor: Cherubino Manzoni
- Successor: Carlo Mannello

Orders
- Consecration: 9 Jul 1651 by Marcantonio Franciotti

Personal details
- Born: Spoleto, Italy
- Died: 1653

Antonio Leoncillo (or Leoncello or Leoncilli) (died c. 1653) was a Roman Catholic prelate who served as Bishop of Termoli (1651–1653?).

== Biography ==
Antonio Leoncillo was born in Spoleto, Italy. On 3 July 1651, he was appointed during the papacy of Pope Innocent X as Bishop of Termoli.

On 9 July 1651, he was consecrated bishop by Marcantonio Franciotti, Cardinal-Priest of Santa Maria della Pace.

He served as Bishop of Termoli until his death in 1653.

== External links and additional sources ==
- Cheney, David M. "Diocese of Termoli-Larino". Catholic-Hierarchy.org. (Chronology of Bishops) ^{[self-published]}
- Chow, Gabriel. "Diocese of Termoli-Larino (Italy)". GCatholic.org. (Chronology of Bishops) ^{[self-published]}

Catholic Church titles
Preceded by Cherubino Manzoni	Bishop of Termoli; 1651–1653	Succeeded by Carlo Mannello
