= Sigismondo Isei =

Roman Catholic bishop

Most Reverend Sigismondo Isei
- Bishop of Comacchio
- Church: Catholic Church
- In office: 1655–167
- Predecessor: Giulio Cesare Borea
- Successor: Nicolò d'Arcano

Orders
- Ordination: by 16 September 1645
- Consecration: 12 September 1655 by Giovanni Battista Maria Pallotta

Personal details
- Born: 1 May 1620 Cesene, Italy
- Died: September 1670 (aged 50) Comacchio, Italy

Sigismondo Isei (1 May 1620 – September 1670) was a Roman Catholic prelate who served as Bishop of Comacchio (1655–1670).

== Biography ==
Sigismondo Isei was born in Cesene, Italy on 1 May 1620 and ordained a priest on 16 September 1645. On 30 August 1655, he was appointed during the papacy of Pope Alexander VII as Bishop of Comacchio. On 12 September 1655, he was consecrated bishop by Giovanni Battista Maria Pallotta, Cardinal-Priest of San Pietro in Vincoli, Patrizio Donati, Bishop Emeritus of Minori, Taddeo Altini, Bishop of Civita Castellana e Orte, serving as co-consecrators. He served as Bishop of Comacchio until his death in September 1670.

== External links and additional sources ==
- Cheney, David M. "Diocese of Comacchio (-Pomposa)". Catholic-Hierarchy.org. (for Chronology of Bishops) ^{[self-published]}
- Chow, Gabriel. "Diocese of Comacchio". GCatholic.org. (for Chronology of Bishops) ^{[self-published]}

Catholic Church titles
Preceded by Giulio Cesare Borea	Bishop of Comacchio; 1655–1670	Succeeded by Nicolò d'Arcano
