= Orazio Giraldi =

Italian Roman Catholic prelate

Most Reverend Orazio Giraldi
- Bishop of Comacchio
- Church: Catholic Church
- In office: 1592–1617
- Predecessor: Ercole Sacrati
- Successor: Alfonso Sacrati

Orders
- Consecration: 24 June 1592 by Giulio Canani

Personal details
- Died: 1617

Orazio Giraldi (died 1617) was a Roman Catholic prelate who served as Bishop of Comacchio (1592–1617).

== Biography ==
On 22 April 1592, Orazio Giraldi was appointed during the papacy of Pope Clement VIII as Bishop of Comacchio. On 24 June 1592, he was consecrated bishop by Giulio Canani, Bishop of Modena, with Giovanni Fontana, Bishop of Ferrara, and Gaspare Silingardi, Bishop Emeritus of Ripatransone, serving as co-consecrators. He served as Bishop of Comacchio until his death on 29 January 1617.

== External links and additional sources ==
- Cheney, David M. "Diocese of Comacchio (-Pomposa)". Catholic-Hierarchy.org. (for Chronology of Bishops) ^{[self-published]}
- Chow, Gabriel. "Diocese of Comacchio". GCatholic.org. (for Chronology of Bishops) ^{[self-published]}

Catholic Church titles
Preceded by Ercole Sacrati	Bishop of Comacchio; 1592–1617	Succeeded by Alfonso Sacrati
