= Termoli Cathedral =

Cathedral in Termoli, Italy

Coordinates: 42°00′19″N 14°59′51″E

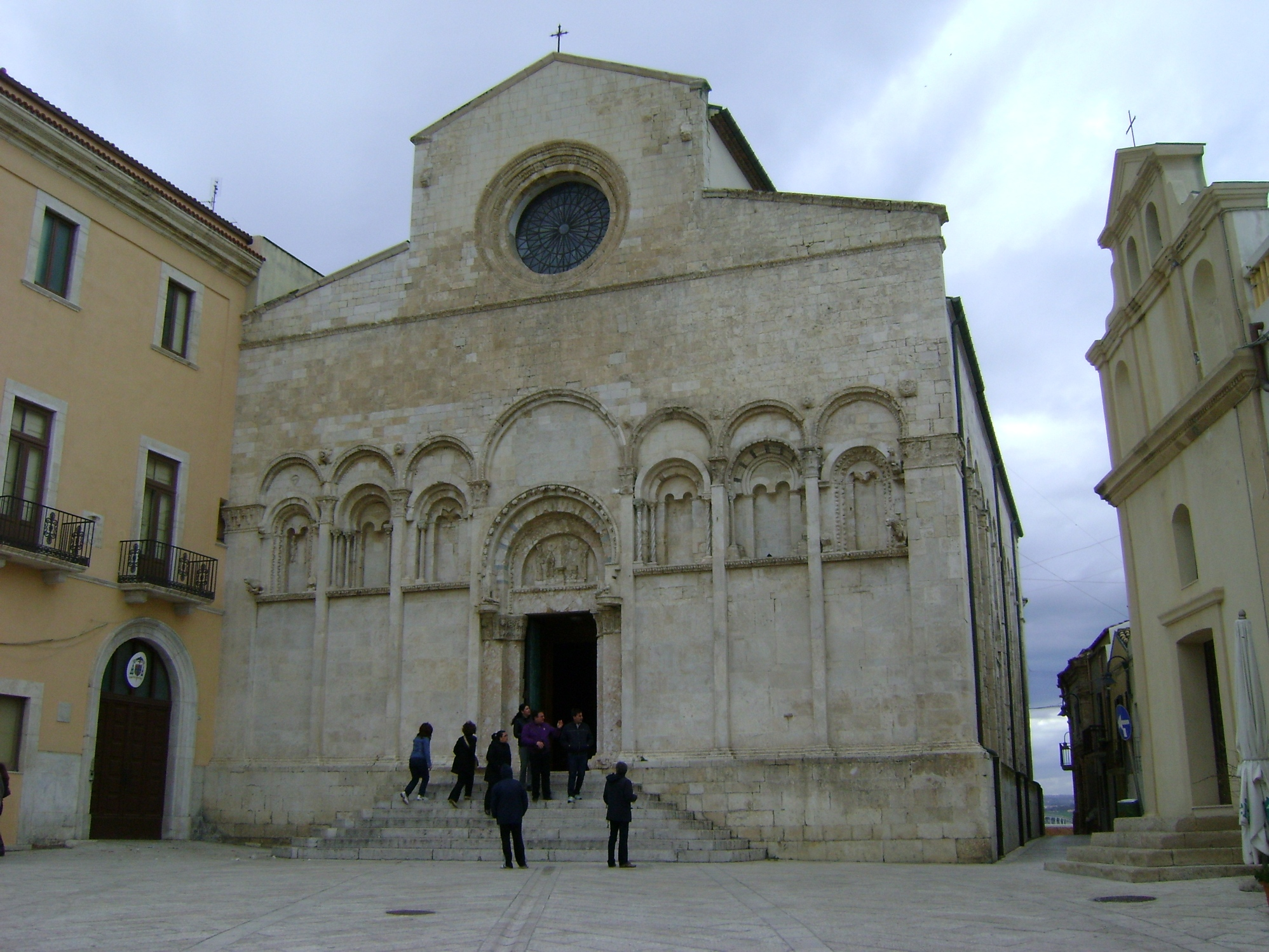
Termoli Cathedral

Termoli Cathedral (Italian: Duomo di Termoli; Cattedrale di Santa Maria della Purificazione) is a Roman Catholic cathedral in Termoli, in the province of Campobasso, central Italy. The dedication is to the Purification of the Virgin Mary, but is commonly ascribed to Saints Bassus and Timothy, patrons of the city. It is the seat of the Bishop of Termoli-Larino.

== History ==
The first church was built around the 6th century on the ruins of a temple dedicated to Castor and Pollux. There is a reference to a larger church dedicated to the Virgin Mary (Ecclesia Sanctae Matris) in 1037, a few years after the synod held by Pope John XIII in 969, which was attended by the first bishop of Termoli. Some remains have been discovered, under the extant church, of an 11th-century basilica.

The present Romanesque building was constructed in the 12th and 13th centuries on the site of its predecessors, and is attributed to Alfano of Termoli, perhaps the same who made the ciborium in Bari Cathedral.

The cathedral was restored after an earthquake in 1464 and again after an attack by Ottoman Turks in 1566. During other renovation works in 1760 and 1962, the relics of Saint Bassus of Lucera and of Saint Timothy respectively, patron saints of the city of Termoli, were discovered.

== Description ==
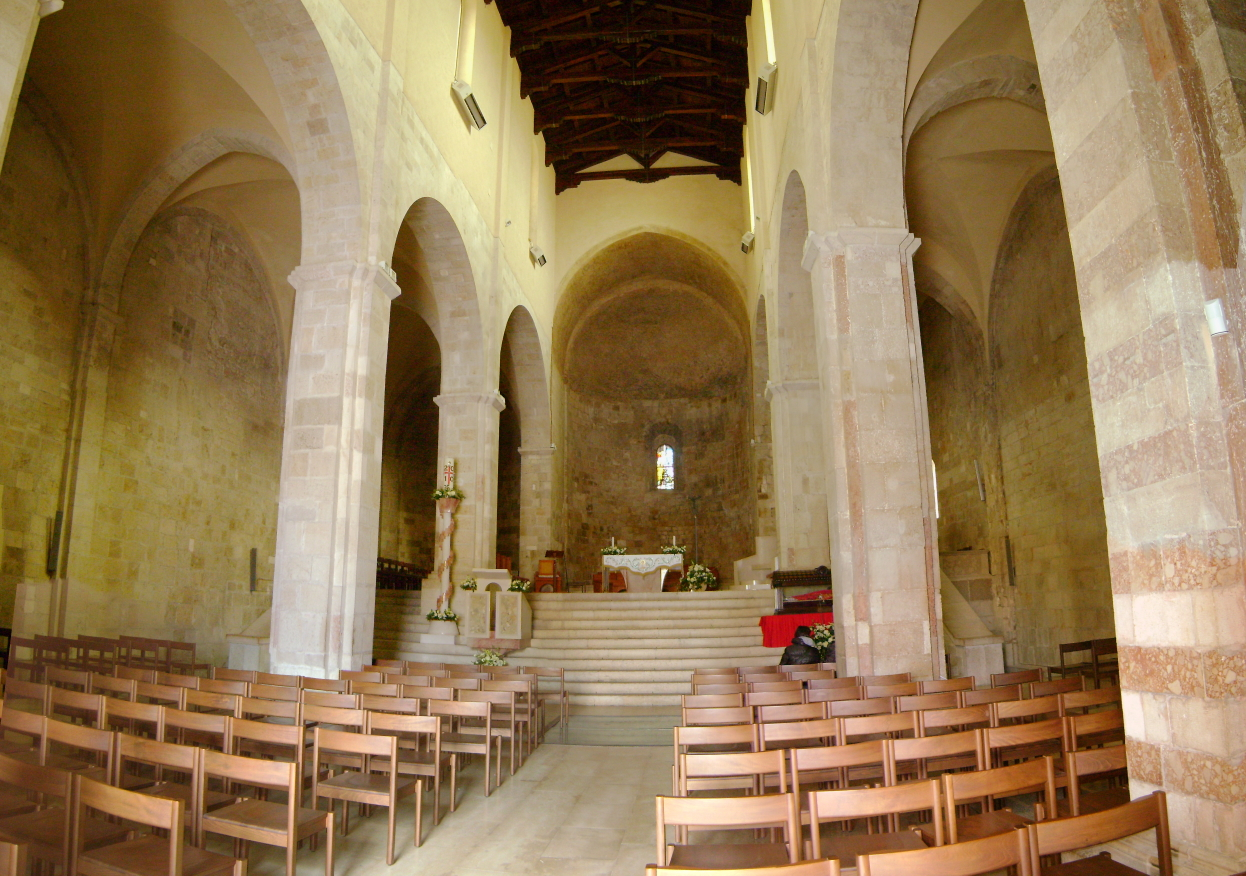
Interior view

The west front of the cathedral measures 22 metres at its highest point. The lower, older, part is elaborately ornamented; the upper part contains only the rose window, and was restored after the Turkish raid of 1566.

In the lower part are seven blind arcades with double mullioned windows, each different from the others, and decorated with acanthus leaves and human figures. The central arcade, which is bigger than the others, has a portal surrounded by small columns. The inscription in one of the lunettes of the double window commemorates Stasio Grimaldi di Giovanni, who contributed financially to the building works of the cathedral.

The cathedral has a basilical ground plan, with three naves and three semicircular apses with piers on round bases. The interior has been returned to its original condition after lengthy restoration works between 1930 and 1969, which removed the Baroque additions.

== Sources ==
- Palma, G. and others (1996): Termoli, i dintorni, le Tremiti. Leone Editrice
- La Basilica Cattedrale. Azienda Autonoma di Soggiorno e Turismo di Termoli (A.A.S.T.), 2000
