= De Vecchis =

De Vecchis is a surname of Italian origin. Notable people with the surname include:

- Mauro De Vecchis (born 1967), Italian football coach
- William De Vecchis (born 1971), Italian politician

== See also ==
- De Vecchi
