= Alfonso Pandolfi =

Most Reverend Alfonso Pandolfi
- Bishop of Comacchio
- Church: Catholic Church
- Diocese: Diocese of Comacchio
- In office: 1631–1648
- Predecessor: Camillo Moro
- Successor: Giulio Cesare Borea

Orders
- Consecration: 18 May 1631 by Carlo Emmanuele Pio di Savoia

Personal details
- Died: 4 October 1648

Alfonso Pandolfi or Alphonse Pandolfi (died 1648) was a Roman Catholic prelate who served as Bishop of Comacchio (1631–1648).

== Biography ==
On 12 May 1631, Alfonso Pandolfi was appointed during the papacy of Pope Urban VIII as Bishop of Comacchio. On 18 May 1631, he was consecrated bishop by Carlo Emmanuele Pio di Savoia, Cardinal-Bishop of Porto e Santa Rufina, with Erasmo Paravicini, Bishop of Alessandria della Paglia, and Angelo Cesi, Bishop of Rimini, serving as co-consecrators. He served as Bishop of Comacchio until his death on 4 October 1648.

While bishop, he was the principal co-consecrator of Didier Palleti, (1644).

== External links and additional sources ==
- Cheney, David M. "Diocese of Comacchio (-Pomposa)". Catholic-Hierarchy.org. (for Chronology of Bishops) ^{[self-published]}
- Chow, Gabriel. "Diocese of Comacchio". GCatholic.org. (for Chronology of Bishops) ^{[self-published]}

Catholic Church titles
| Preceded by Camillo Moro | Bishop of Comacchio; 1631–1648 | Succeeded by Giulio Cesare Borea |
