= Giulio Cesare Borea =

Most Reverend Giulio Cesare Borea
- Bishop of Comacchio
- Church: Catholic Church
- Diocese: Diocese of Comacchio
- In office: 1649–1655
- Predecessor: Alfonso Pandolfi
- Successor: Sigismondo Isei

Orders
- Consecration: 11 July 1649 by Marcantonio Franciotti

Personal details
- Born: 1621 Lugo, Spain
- Died: 11 March 1655 (age 34)

Giulio Cesare Borea (1621–1655) was a Roman Catholic prelate who served as Bishop of Comacchio (1649–1655).

== Biography ==
Giulio Cesare Borea was born in 1621 in Lugo, Spain. On 28 June 1649, he was appointed during the papacy of Pope Innocent X as Bishop of Comacchio. On 11 July 1649, he was consecrated bishop by Marcantonio Franciotti, Cardinal-Priest of Santa Maria della Pace, with Luca Torreggiani, Archbishop of Ravenna, and Giambattista Spínola (seniore), Archbishop of Acerenza e Matera, serving as co-consecrators. He served as Bishop of Comacchio until his death on 11 March 1655.

While bishop, he was the principal co-consecrator of Benedetto Odescalchi (later Pope Innocent XI), Bishop of Novara.

== External links and additional sources ==
- Cheney, David M. "Diocese of Comacchio (-Pomposa)". Catholic-Hierarchy.org. (for Chronology of Bishops) ^{[self-published]}
- Chow, Gabriel. "Diocese of Comacchio". GCatholic.org. (for Chronology of Bishops) ^{[self-published]}

Catholic Church titles
Preceded by Alfonso Pandolfi	Bishop of Comacchio; 1649–1655	Succeeded by Sigismondo Isei
