= Federico Mezio =

17th-century Roman Catholic bishop

Most Reverend Federico Mezio
- Bishop of Termoli
- Church: Catholic Church
- Diocese: Diocese of Termoli
- In office: 1602–1612
- Predecessor: Alberto Drago
- Successor: Camillo Moro

Personal details
- Died: 1612

Federico Mezio (Latin: Federicus Metius) (died 1612) was a Roman Catholic prelate who served as Bishop of Termoli (1602–1612).

== Biography ==
On 14 Jan 1602, Federico Mezio was appointed during the papacy of Pope Clement VIII as Bishop of Termoli. He served as Bishop of Termoli until his death in 1612.

== External links and additional sources ==
- Cheney, David M. "Diocese of Termoli-Larino". Catholic-Hierarchy.org. (Chronology of Bishops) ^{[self-published]}
- Chow, Gabriel. "Diocese of Termoli-Larino (Italy)". GCatholic.org. (Chronology of Bishops) ^{[self-published]}

Catholic Church titles
Preceded by Alberto Drago	Bishop of Termoli; 1602–1612	Succeeded by Camillo Moro
