= Nicolò d'Arcano =

Italian Roman Catholic prelate

Most Reverend Nicolò d'Arcano
- Bishop of Comacchio
- Church: Catholic Church
- Diocese: Diocese of Comacchio
- In office: 1670–1714
- Predecessor: Sigismondo Isei
- Successor: Francesco Bentini

Orders
- Ordination: 9 November 1670
- Consecration: 4 January 1671

Personal details
- Born: 1637 Cesena, Italy
- Died: 1 January 1714 (aged 76–77) Comacchio, Italy

Nicolò d'Arcano (1637 – 1 January 1714) was a Roman Catholic prelate who served as Bishop of Comacchio (1670–1714).

== Biography ==
Nicolò d'Arcano was born in Cesena, Italy in 1637 and ordained a priest on 9 November 1670. On 22 December 1670, he was appointed during the papacy of Pope Clement X as Bishop of Comacchio. On 4 January 1671, he was consecrated bishop by Marcello Santacroce, Bishop of Tivoli, with Pier Antonio Capobianco, Bishop Emeritus of Lacedonia, and Andrea Tamantini, Bishop of Cagli, serving as co-consecrators. He served as Bishop of Comacchio until his death on 1 January 1714.

While bishop, he was the principal co-consecrator of Leone Strozzi (archbishop), Bishop of Pistoia e Prato (1690); and Raimondo Ferretti, Bishop of Recanati e Loreto (1690).

== External links and additional sources ==
- Cheney, David M. "Diocese of Comacchio (-Pomposa)". Catholic-Hierarchy.org. (for Chronology of Bishops) ^{[self-published]}
- Chow, Gabriel. "Diocese of Comacchio". GCatholic.org. (for Chronology of Bishops) ^{[self-published]}

Catholic Church titles
| Preceded by Sigismondo Isei | Bishop of Comacchio; 1670–1714 | Succeeded by Francesco Bentini |
