= Antonio Savo de' Panicoli =

Most Reverend Antonio Savo de' Panicoli
- Bishop of Termoli
- Church: Catholic Church
- Diocese: Diocese of Termoli
- In office: 1677–1687
- Predecessor: Fabrizio Maracchi
- Successor: Marcus Antonius Rossi

Orders
- Ordination: 7 June 1659
- Consecration: 2 January 1678 by Gasparo Carpegna

Personal details
- Born: 1629 Rome, Italy
- Died: November 1687 (age 58)

Antonio Savo de' Panicoli (1629–1687) was a Roman Catholic prelate who served as Bishop of Termoli (1677–1687).

== Biography ==
Antonio Savo de' Panicoli was born in Rome, Italy in 1629 and ordained a priest on 7 June 1659. On 20 December 1677, he was appointed during the papacy of Pope Innocent XI as Bishop of Termoli. On 2 January 1678, he was consecrated bishop by Gasparo Carpegna, Cardinal-Priest of San Silvestro in Capite, with Giacomo de Angelis, Archbishop Emeritus of Urbino, and Giacomo Buoni, Bishop of Montefeltro, serving as co-consecrators. He served as Bishop of Termoli until his death in November 1687.

== Episcopal succession ==
While bishop, he was the principal co-consecrator of:

- Tommaso Guzzoni, Bishop of Sora (1681); and
- Andrea Brancaccio, Bishop of Conversano (1681).

== External links and additional sources ==
- Cheney, David M. "Diocese of Termoli-Larino". Catholic-Hierarchy.org. (Chronology of Bishops) ^{[self-published]}
- Chow, Gabriel. "Diocese of Termoli-Larino (Italy)". GCatholic.org. (Chronology of Bishops) ^{[self-published]}

Catholic Church titles
Preceded by Fabrizio Maracchi	Bishop of Termoli; 1677–1687	Succeeded by Marcus Antonius Rossi
