= Vecchi Editore =

Italian book publishing firm

VECCHI EDITORE Srl
- Company type: Private
- Industry: Books, Publishing
- Predecessor: Art.s Studio; Librinet.com
- Founded: 1989 (Art.s Studio); 2005 (current ownership)
- Headquarters: Sarzana, Province of La Spezia, Italy
- Key people: Augusto Vecchi (CEO)
- Products: Children's books
- Services: Publishing houses, Bookshops
- Website: www.vecchieditore.com

Vecchi Editore Srl is an Italian publishing house founded in 2005 by Augusto Vecchi. It specializes in children's books and also publishes under the name of Abaco Edizioni.

== History ==
Vecchi Editore was founded and directed by Augusto Vecchi. In 1989, Vecchi began working in the publishing field and co-operating with important Italian and foreign publishers.

The core business of Vecchi Editore is the creation, development, production and publication of educational illustrated books for children, that in Italy are published with the trademark Abaco Edizioni owned by Vecchi Editore. This Italian independent publishing house has been attending the main international book fairs with its own booth, arising the interest of many foreign publishers who more and more frequently join the co-editions of children's books realized by the Italian Company, allowing Vecchi Editore to increase its share of the International market and to be now present in more than 40 Countries.

In October 2008 Vecchi Editore Srl, in the person of Mr. Augusto Vecchi, was invited by the Italian Ministry of Foreign Affairs, by the Italian Ministry of Culture and by the Italian Ministry for the Economic Development at Villa Madama on the occasion of the introduction of the event "Italy as Guest of Honour at Guadalajara (Mexico) International Book Fair", the second most important exhibition for the publishing sector, after Frankfurt International Book Fair. Vecchi Editore Srl is one of the 60 Publishing Houses invited to "represent the best of the Italian Culture for the export".

== Sponsorships ==
Vecchi Editore is sponsoring the Red Jackets, the team of American Football champion Italy 2009 (under 21) and winner of the 2010 Italian Super Bowl XXX.

== Properties ==
- Joe Fox
- Glam Agency
- Lulù the blue fairy
- 4 Real Friends
- Rudy & Vichy
- Love forever
- Lappo the Gnome
- The two Elves

== Licensees ==
- School of Vampires
- Piru & Zabù
