= Diocese of Termoli-Larino =

Latin Catholic diocese in Italy

Coordinates: 42.0000°N 14.9833°E

Diocese of Termoli-Larino Dioecesis Thermularum-Larinensis

Catholic
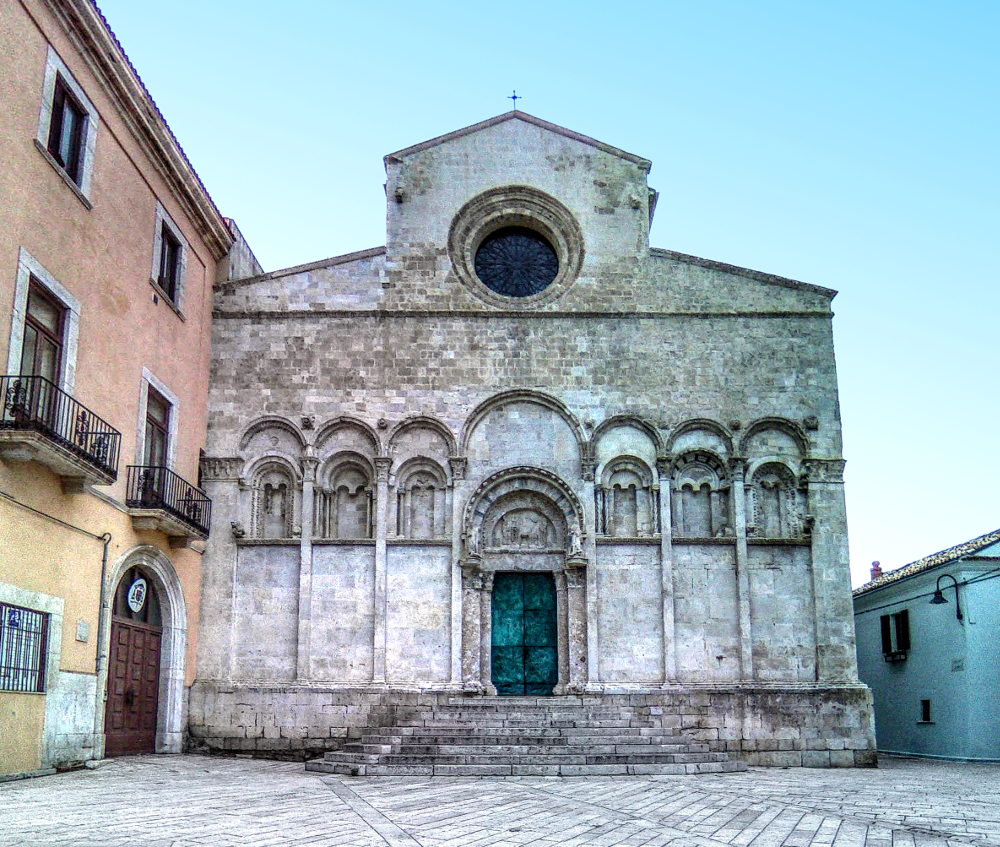
- Cathedral of Termoli

Location
- Country: Italy
- Ecclesiastical province: Campobasso-Boiano

Statistics
- Area: 1,424 km^{2} (550 sq mi)
- Population: Total; Catholics: (as of 2023); 108,000 (est.) ▼; 107,800 (est.) ▼
- Parishes: 51 ▲

Information
- Denomination: Catholic Church
- Sui iuris church: Latin Church
- Rite: Roman Rite
- Established: 10th Century
- Cathedral: Termoli Cathedral (Termoli)
- Co-cathedral: Concattedrale di S. Maria Assunta (Venafro)
- Secular priests: 51 (diocesan} ▼12 (Religious Orders); 5 Permanent Deacons

Current leadership
- Pope: Leo XIV
- Bishop: Claudio Palumbo
- Bishops emeritus: Gianfranco De Luca

Map
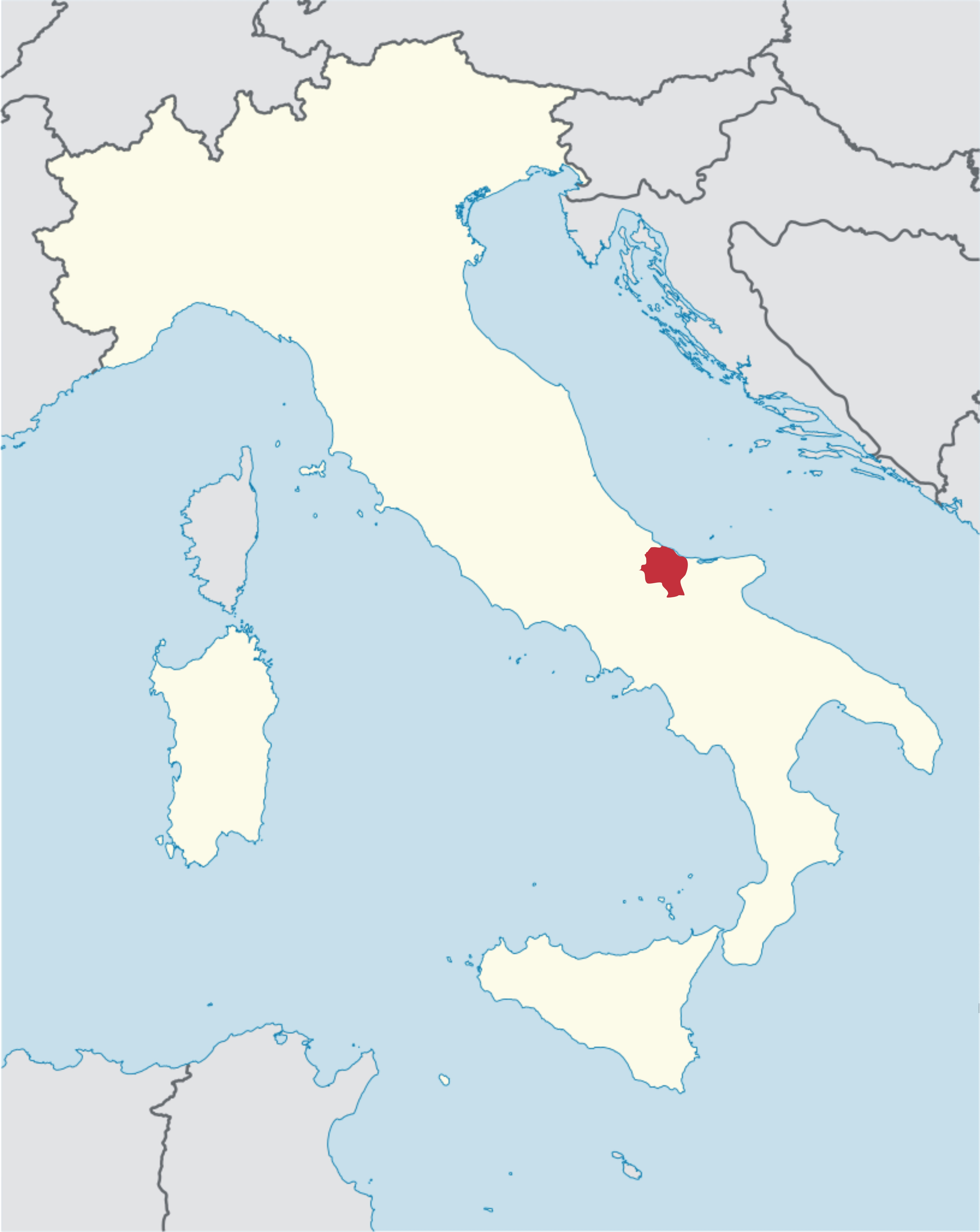

Website
- www.diocesitermolilarino.it

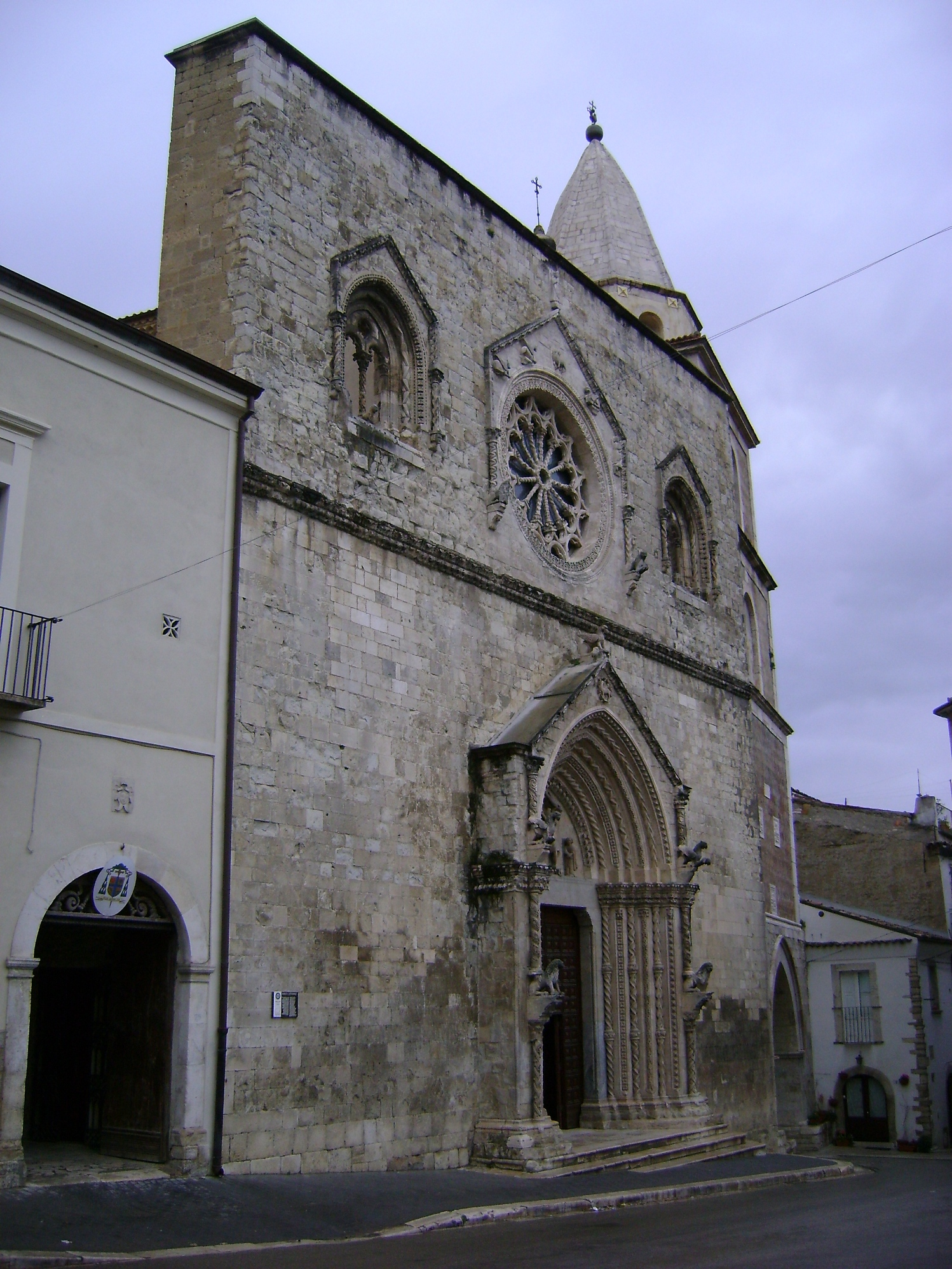
Co-cathedral in Larino

The Diocese of Termoli-Larino (Latin: Dioecesis Thermularum-Larinensis) is a Latin Church diocese of the Catholic Church situated in the province of Campobasso, region of Molise. The commune of Termoli is an important regional seaport on the Adriatic. The diocese has existed in its current configuration since 1986, when the diocese of Larino was suppressed and added to its territory. It is a suffragan of the archdiocese of Campobasso-Boiano.

== History ==
In 946, Pope Agapitus II (946–955) personally consecrated two bishops, the priest and monk Leo for the diocese of Trivento, and the priest Benedict for the diocese of Termoli. This produced an immediate protest from Archbishop Joannes of Benevento, who, as metropolitan, enjoyed the privilege of consecrated suffragan bishops in his ecclesiastical province. Agapitus admitted that he had done this in ignorance and contrary to the rules (irrationabiliter a sese episcopis consecratis et ipsum ordinem rei nesciente), and he ordered the clergy and laity of the two dioceses not to receive Leo and Benedict as their rightful bishops.

According to Ferdinando Ughelli, whose information is repeated by nearly all authorities, the earliest known bishop of Termoli was Scio, who subscribed a bull of Pope John XIII in 969, establishing the ecclesiastical province of Benevento. The actual text of the bull, however, does not name Scio's diocese. The diocese was a suffragan (subordinate) of the archdiocese of Benevento.

The earthquake of 11 October 1125 caused considerable damage in Termoli.

=== Destruction in war with Venice ===
In May 1219, the Emperor Frederick II gave orders that Termoli should be fortified with five fortresses (casalitia). In 1242, the Venetians, who had long been urged to come to the support of the Papal States in the struggle with Frederick II, finally opened a campaign in Apulia by attacking Termoli. The city was ruined. Frederick immediately had the castrum of Termoli rebuilt. In the autumn of 1297, Frederick wrote to the justiciar of the Capitinata, appointing Hugo de Abbemara castellan of the castrum of Termoli, and assigning him sufficient soldiers and a port officer.

In 1620, a serious earthquake caused heavy damage to the façade of the cathedral of Termoli.

=== Population ===
In 1677, the population of Termoli was c. 300 persons. In 1753, it was estimated at 1,000 persons. In the census of 1861, the population had risen to 2626.

=== Chapter and cathedral ===
The cathedral in Termoli is dedicated to the Virgin Mary and S. Bassus, whose body is buried in the church. It is administered by a corporation called the Chapter, consisting of twelve canons, including three dignities (the Archdeacon, the Archpriest, and the Primicerius). The cathedral is also a parish church, and the spiritual needs of the parishioners are serviced by the Archpriest.

=== After the French ===
Following the extinction of the Napoleonic Kingdom of Italy, the Congress of Vienna authorized the restoration of the Papal States and the Kingdom of Naples. Since the French occupation had seen the abolition of many Church institutions in the Kingdom, as well as the confiscation of much Church property and resources, it was imperative that Pope Pius VII and King Ferdinand IV reach agreement on restoration and restitution. Ferdinand demanded the suppression of fifty dioceses.

A concordat was finally signed on 16 February 1818, and ratified by Pius VII on 25 February 1818. Ferdinand issued the concordat as a law on 21 March 1818. On 27 June 1818, Pius VII issued the bull De Ulteriore, in which the ecclesiastical province of Benevento was restored, including it suffragans, among them the diocese of Termoli. The decision was also made to suppress permanently the diocese of Guardialfiera, and to incorporate its territory into the diocese of Termoli.

=== New ecclesiastical province ===
Following the Second Vatican Council, and in accordance with the norms laid out in the council's decree, Christus Dominus chapter 40, Pope Paul VI ordered a reorganization of the ecclesiastical provinces in southern Italy. On 21 August 1976, he issued the decree "Ad apicem", creating the new ecclesiastical province entitled «Boianensis-Campobassensis», with its administrative center in Campobasso. The metropolitan archdiocese was assigned as suffragans the dioceses of Trivento (which had been immediately subject to the Holy See), Isernia-Venafro (which had been subject to the metropolitan archdiocese of Capua), and Termoli-Larino (which had been subject to the metropolitan archdiocese of Benevento.

== Bishops ==
=== Diocese of Termoli ===
Erected: 10th Century
Latin Name: Thermularum

==== to 1500 ====
...

- Nicolaus (attested 1071–1075)

...

- Jocelinus (1095)

...

- Ursus (attested 1126)

...

- Goffridus (attested 1179)

...

- Alferius (attested 1196)

...

- Angelus (attested 1226)
- Stephanus (attested 1235)
- Valentinus (attested 1254)
- Joannes (attested 1265)

...

- Bartholomaeus Aldomarisso (attested 1304)
- Joannes (attested 1318)
- Bartolommeo (d. 1352)
- Lucas (1353 – 1364)
- Francesco della Stella (1364 – 1372)
- Jacobus da S. Andrea, O.P. (1372 – 1379?)
- Giovanni da San Gemino (1379 – ? ) Avignon Obedience
- Domenico del Girarda, O.Serv. (c. 1379 ? – c. 1387) Roman Obedience
- Andreas (1388 – 1390) Roman Obedience
- Constantinus (1390 – 1395) Roman Obedience
- Petrus (1395 – c. 1400) Roman Obedience
- Thomas
- Antonio (1402 – 1403)
- Stephanus da Cività Castellana. O.Min. (1403 – 1406) Roman Obedience
- Paolo (1406 – 1422)
- Antonio da Termoli, O.E.S.A. (1422 – 1455)
- Tuccio (1455 – 1465)
- Leonardo (1465 – 1472)
- Giacomo (1473 – 1496)

==== 1500 to 1650 ====
- Giovanni de' Vecchi (9 Jan 1497 – 1509 Died)
- Angelo Antonio Guiliani (13 Jul 1509 – 1517 Died)
- Sancio de Ayerbe (20 Apr 1517 – 1518 Resigned)
- Antonio Attilio (5 May 1518 – 1536 Died)
- Pietro Durante (23 Oct 1536 – 1539 Died)
- Vincenzo Durante (14 Jul 1539 – 1565 Resigned)
- Marcello Dentice (17 Aug 1565 – 1569 Died)
- Cesare Ferrante (1 Apr 1569 – 1593 Died)
- Annibale Muzi (1594)
- Francesco Scotti (12 Dec 1594 – 1599 Died)
- Alberto Drago, O.P. (1599 – 1601)
- Federico Mezio (14 Jan 1602 – 1612 Died)
- Camillo Mori (3 Dec 1612 – 1626)
- Hector de Monte (1626)
- Gerolamo Cappello, O.F.M. Conv. (1626 – 1643 Died)
- Alessandro Crescenzi, C.R.S. (1643 – 1644)
- Cherubino Manzoni, O.F.M.Conv.Ref. (1644 – 1651)

==== 1650 to 1800 ====
- Antonio Leoncilli (1651 – 1653?)
- Carlo Manelli (1653 – 1661 Resigned)
- Fabrizio Maracchi (13 Feb 1662 – Aug 1676)
- Antonio Savo de' Panicoli (20 Dec 1677 – Nov 1687)
- Marcus Antonius Rossi (14 Jun 1688 – 27 Jun 1688)
- Michele Petirro (6 Jun 1689 – 1705)
- Domenico Catalani (22 Feb 1706 – Oct 1709)
- Tommaso Maria Farina, O.P. (14 Mar 1718 – Dec 1718)
- Salvatore di Aloisio (15 May 1719 – Aug 1729)
- Giuseppe Antonio Silvestri (28 Nov 1729 – May 1743)
- Isidoro Pitellia, O.M. (15 Jul 1743 – 22 Sep 1752)
- Tommaso Giannelli (12 Mar 1753 – Nov 1768)
- Giuseppe Bucarelli (12 Jun 1769 – Apr 1780)
- Anselmo Maria Toppi, O.S.B. (1792 – 1800)

==== 1800 to 1988 ====
Sede vacante (1800–1819)

- Giovanni Battista Bolognese (1819 – 1822)
- Pietro Consiglio (3 Mar 1824 – 1826)
- Gennaro de Rubertis (1827 – 1845)
- Domenico Ventura (21 Dec 1846 Confirmed – 1849)
- Vincenzo Bisceglia (5 Sep 1851 Confirmed – 12 Feb 1889)
- Raffaele di Nonno, C.SS.R. (12 Feb 1889 Succeeded – 16 Jan 1893 Appointed Archbishop of Acerenza e Matera)
- Angelo Balzano (16 Jan 1893 – 29 Apr 1909 Resigned)
- Giovanni Capitoli (29 Apr 1909 – 14 Feb 1911 Appointed Bishop of Bagnoregio)
- Rocco Caliandro (28 Mar 1912 – 14 Mar 1924 Died)
- Oddo Bernacchia (28 Oct 1924 – 19 Mar 1962 Retired)
- Giovanni Proni (18 Apr 1962 – 10 Mar 1970 Appointed Coadjutor Bishop of Forlì)
- Pietro Santoro (12 Jun 1970 – 15 Oct 1979 Appointed Archbishop of Boiano-Campobasso)
- Cosmo Francesco Ruppi (13 May 1980 – 7 Dec 1988 Appointed Archbishop of Lecce)

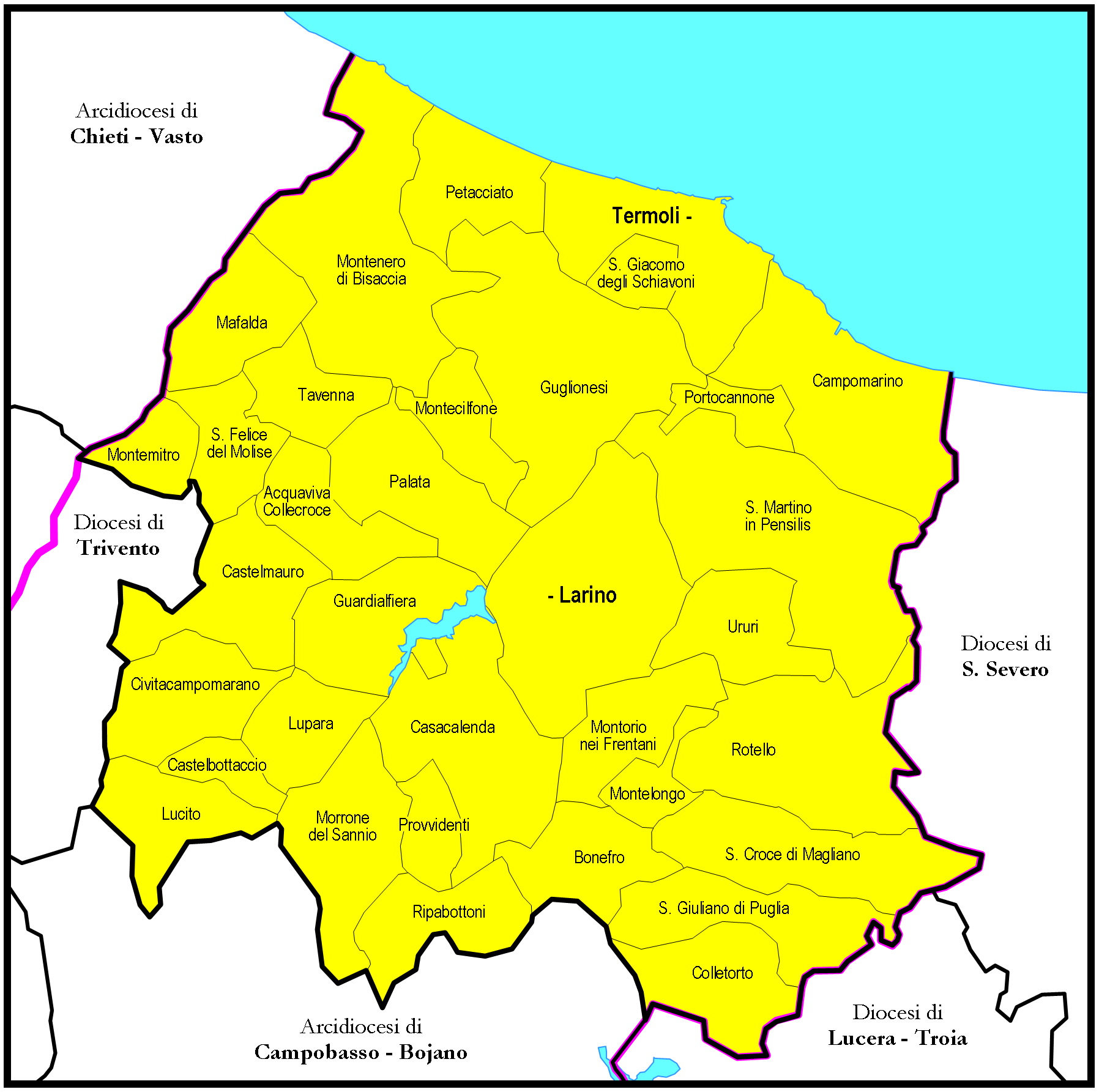
diocese of Termoli-Larino

=== Diocese of Termoli-Larino ===
30 September 1986 United with Diocese of Larino
Latin Name: Thermularum-Larinensis

- Domenico Umberto D'Ambrosio (14 Dec 1989 – 27 May 1999 Appointed, Archbishop of Foggia-Bovino)
- Tommaso Valentinetti (25 Mar 2000 – 4 Nov 2005 Appointed, Archbishop of Pescara-Penne)
- Gianfranco De Luca (22 Apr 2006 – 7 Dec 2024)
- Claudio Palumbo (7 Dec 2024 – present)

== See also ==
- Roman Catholic Archdiocese of Campobasso-Boiano
- Roman Catholic Diocese of Guardialfiera (suppressed 1818)
- List of Catholic dioceses in Italy

== Books ==
=== Reference works ===
- Gams, Pius Bonifatius (1873). Series episcoporum Ecclesiae catholicae (in Latin). Ratisbon: Typis et Sumptibus Georgii Josephi Manz. pp. 932–933.
- Eubel, Conradus, ed. (1913). Hierarchia catholica (in Latin). Vol. I (second ed.). Münster: Libreria Regensbergiana.
- Eubel, Conradus, ed. (1914). Hierarchia catholica (in Latin). Vol. II (second ed.). Münster: Libreria Regensbergiana.
- Eubel, Conradus; Gulik, Guilelmus (1923). Hierarchia catholica (in Latin). Vol. III (second ed.). Münster: Libreria Regensbergiana.
- Gauchat, Patritius (Patrice) (1935). Hierarchia catholica (in Latin). Vol. IV (1592-1667). Münster: Libraria Regensbergiana.
- Ritzler, Remigius; Sefrin, Pirminus (1952). Hierarchia catholica medii et recentis aevi (in Latin). Vol. V (1667-1730). Patavii: Messagero di S. Antonio.
- Ritzler, Remigius; Sefrin, Pirminus (1958). Hierarchia catholica medii et recentis aevi (in Latin). Vol. VI (1730-1799). Patavii: Messagero di S. Antonio.
- Ritzler, Remigius; Sefrin, Pirminus (1968). Hierarchia Catholica medii et recentioris aevi... (in Latin). Vol. VII (1800–1846). Monasterii: Libr. Regensburgiana.
- Remigius Ritzler; Pirminus Sefrin (1978). Hierarchia catholica Medii et recentioris aevi (in Latin). Vol. VIII (1846–1903). Il Messaggero di S. Antonio.
- Pięta, Zenon (2002). Hierarchia catholica medii et recentioris aevi... (in Latin). Vol. IX (1903-1922). Padua: Messagero di San Antonio. ISBN 978-88-250-1000-8.

=== Studies ===
- Cappelletti, Giuseppe (1864). Le chiese d'Italia: dalla loro origine sino ai nostri giorni (in Italian). Vol. XIX. Venezia: G. Antonelli. pp. 351–357.
- D'Avino, Vincenzo (1848). Cenni storici sulle chiese arcivescovili, vescovili, e prelatizie (nulluis) del Regno delle Due Sicilie (in Italian). Napoli: Ranucci. pp. 668–673. [article by Gennaro De Rubertis]
- Kehr, Paulus Fridolin (1962). Italia pontificia. Regesta pontificum Romanorum. Vol. IX: Samnia – Apulia – Lucania. Berlin: Weidmann. (in Latin). pp. 187–190.
- Klewitz, Hans-Walter (1933), Zur geschichte der bistums organization Campaniens und Apuliens im 10. und 11. Jahrhundert, (in German), in: Quellen und Forschungen aus italienischen Archiven und Bibliotheken, XXIV (1932–33), p. 51.
- Masciotta, Giambattista (1914). Il Molise dalle origini ai nostri giorni. Vol. I - La provincia di Molise (in Italian). Napoli: Luigi Pierro 1914. (pp. 239 ff.)
- Ughelli, Ferdinando; Coleti, Nicolaus (1721). Italia sacra, sive de episcopis Italiae, et insularum adjacentium (in Latin). Vol. Tomus octavus (8). Venezia: Apud Sebastianum Coleti. pp. 374–379.
