= Bassus of Lucera =

Bishop, martyr, patron saint of Termoli

Saint Bassus of Lucera
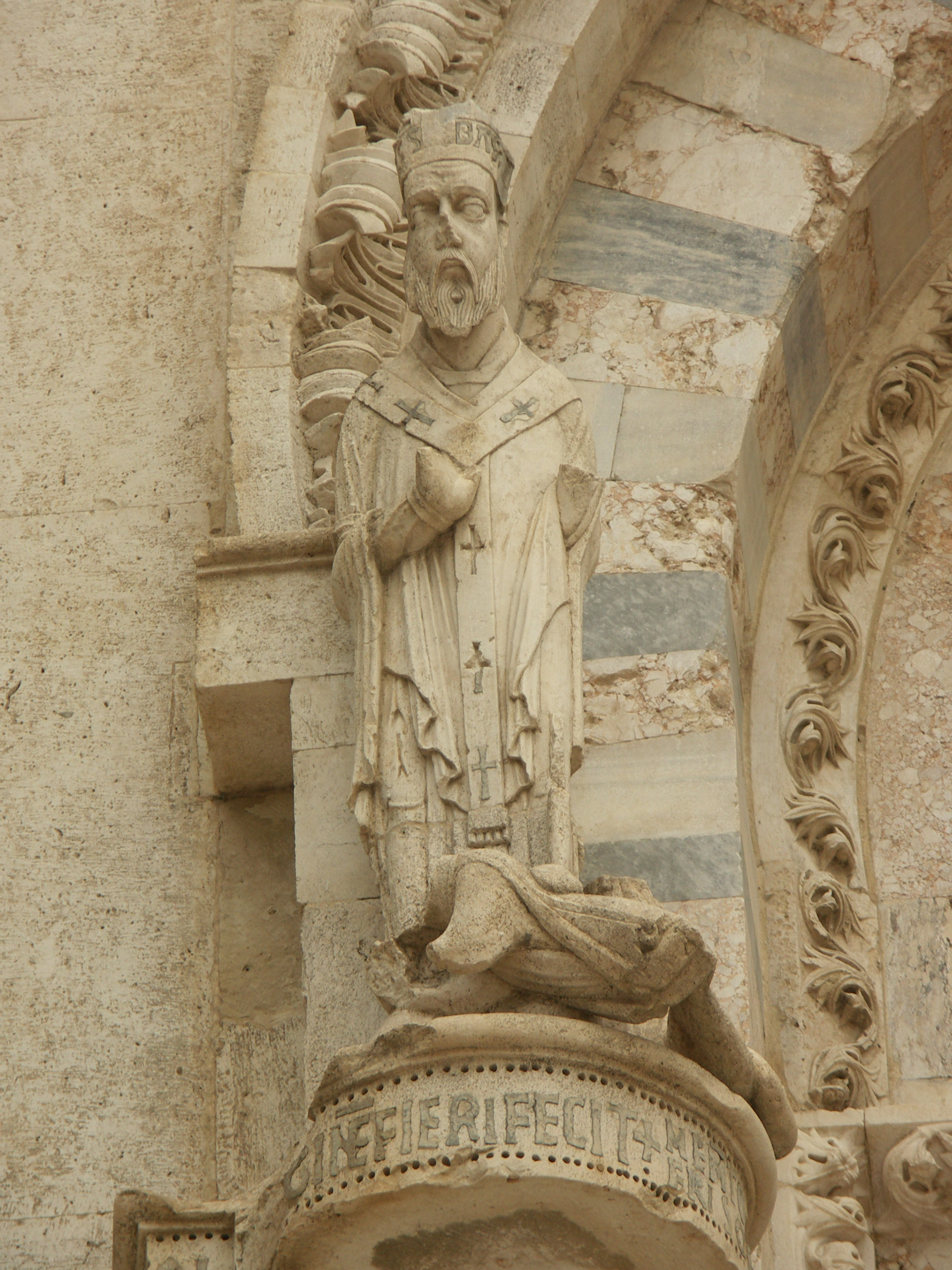
- Statue of St. Bassus. Cathedral of Termoli.

Bishop and Martyr
- Born: ~40-50 AD
- Died: 118 AD
- Venerated in: Roman Catholic Church; Eastern Orthodox Church
- Feast: 5 December
- Patronage: Termoli

Saint Bassus of Lucera (Italian: Basso di Lucera; c 40/50–118) was a Christian martyr and saint, and traditionally the first bishop of Lucera in Apulia, Italy. He is the patron saint of Termoli.

== Legend ==
One of the earliest Christian communities is believed to have been established in Lucera. As a young man, Basso pursued a career in law. The legend of the saint relates that in about the year 60 Saint Peter passed through Lucera on his way to Rome, and put Bassus at the head of the nascent bishopric.

His relics are housed in the Cattedrale di Santa Maria della Purificazione in Termoli. An annual festival is held in his honor in Termoli on August 3rd and 4th. He is commemorated in the Roman Martyrology on December 5.

== Disagreements on identity ==
There is some controversy regarding the identity of Bassus, in that there is potential confusion between Saint Bassus of Lucera and Saint Bassus of Nice (or Nicaea), who was also a bishop and martyr and whose feast day also falls on 5 December, although his martyrdom took place at Nice in about 250. There may also be confusion with a certain Saint Dasius of Dorostoro, also known as Bassus.

== Sources ==
- San Basso di Termoli historical website (in Italian)
- Folklore of Termoli (in Italian)
- Cupra Marittima: San Basso (in Italian)
