= Roman Catholic Diocese of Comacchio =

The Diocese of Comacchio (Latin: Dioecesis Comaclensis) was a Roman Catholic diocese located in the coastal town of Comacchio in the province of Ferrara and region of Emilia-Romagna, Italy. In 1986, the diocese of Commachio was united with the diocese of Ferrara to form the Roman Catholic Archdiocese of Ferrara-Comacchio, and lost its individual identity.

== History ==
It is often stated that the earliest bishop of Comacchio, indeed the first bishop, was Pacatianus, who is said to have attended the Roman synod of 502. The subscription cumiaclensis in the Acts of the synod, however, has been shown to be a misreading of corneliensis (diocese of Imola). An anonymous bishop, said to have been operating in 592, is known only from a forged bull of Pope Gregory I, and must therefore be excluded. The earliest known bishop is Vincentius, who belongs to the first quarter of the 8th century.

In 1579, Bishop Ercole Sacrati (1563–1591) presided over a diocesan synod, which issued a set of Constitutions for the government of the diocese of Comacchio.

During the French Revolution, an army of the French Republic occupied the Po Valley. Papal troops were withdrawn from Commachio on 22 June 1796, and a month later a Commissary of the French government arrived to turn Commachio into a French city. The diocese of Comacchio was assigned to the Archbishop of Ferrara as a suffragan, since Venice and Ravenna were in the hands of the Austrians. The citizens, clerical and lay, were required to swear an oath to the French Republic: Giuro fedeltà ed obbedienza alla repubblica francese, ed ai suoi delegati, salva la religione, la proprietà, e le persone. The Bishop was assigned the task of imposing the oath on all the clergy. The churches were despoiled, the Augustinians were expelled, and the abbey of Pomposa was closed. When the Congress of Vienna restored the old order in Italy, Austria was allowed to keep all of the territory north of the Po, and it continued to occupy The Three Legations, which legally belonged to the Papal States. Therefore, Comacchio was returned to its status as a suffragan of Ravenna, though the city was politically part of the Legation of Ferrara and the Papal States. The Austrians had a garrison in the castle of Comacchio.

On 18 May 1964, Pope Paul VI, in response to a petition of the Cathedral Chapter of Comacchio, who wished to revive the Benedictine observance at the Territorial Abbey of Pomposa, after consultation with the Abbot Primate of the Order of Saint Benedict, Benno Gut, granted possession of the Abbey of Pomposa to the Bishop of Comacchio, pro tempore and donec aliter caveatur. The Bishop was allowed to call himself Abbas Pomposianus. The decree did not change the name of the diocese.

As part of a project begun on orders from Pope John XXIII, and continued under his successors, to reduce the number of dioceses in Italy and to rationalize their borders in terms of modern population changes and shortages of clergy, the diocese of Comacchio was united to the diocese of Ferrara by a decree of the Sacred Congregation of Bishops, on 30 September 1986. There was to be one bishop, in Ferrara, and one curia, one cathedral, one Council of Consultors, one Council of Priests, and one seminary. The former cathedral of Comacchio was granted the title of Co-cathedral, and its Chapter was retained and not united with the Chapter of the Cathedral of Ferrara.

=== Cathedral and Chapter ===
The Cathedral served as the parish church for the entire city. The rest of the diocese had twelve parishes.

The Chapter of Canons was in existence before 1004. In 1715, the cathedral was served by a Chapter, composed of one dignity (the Archpriest) and four(-teen) Canons; there were also eight lesser clergy (priests) who carried out various liturgical and sacramental functions. In 1745 there was one dignity and seventeen Canons. After the French Empire of Napoleon I had collapsed, Pope Pius VII reestablished the office of Archpriest, by a bull of 22 September 1814. The office of Archdeacon was created by Pope Gregory XVI in 1836, on the initiative of Bishop Michele Virgili (1819–1855).

=== Seminary ===
The seminary of Comacchio was founded by Bishop Bentini in 1745, but the institution was not fully functional until 1755. There were interruptions, however, due to various jurisdictional disputes and financial shortages. It was only in 1781 that the seminary was definitively opened.

After Comaccio became part of the Cisalpine Republic, the French occupation authorities closed the seminary in 1798. Bishop Boari, a Napoleonic enthusiast, reopened the seminary in 1800. During the wars of Italian unification, it was closed again, and not reopened until 1882. In 1930, the lyceum division and the theological division were transferred, with papal approval, to the seminary in Bologna. In 1954 Bishop Natale Mosconi moved the seminary to new quarters, but on 30 November 1967, it was closed due to financial distress, and its students were transferred to the Archdiocesan Seminary of Ferrara. In 1986 the diocese of Comacchio ceased to exist, and became part of the diocese of Ferrara.

== Bishops ==
=== to 1400 ===
[Pacatianus (502)]

- Vincentius (708–723)

Vitalis (781–827)]
...

- Stephanus (c. 872–879)

...

- Cyprianus (attested 898)
- Petrus (before 908)

...

- Orso (attested 955)
- Gregorio (967–969)

...

- Georgius (attested 997)
- Joannes (1003–1016)

...

- Petrus (attested in 1053)

...

- Adelbertus (attested 1086)

...

- Joannes (attested 1205)
- Donatus
- N.
- Bozio
- N.
- Michael (attested 1265)
- Thaddeus
- Bartolus (elected 1285)
- Honoratus
- Petrus Mancinelli, O.P. (1304–1327)
- Superantius Lamberatazzi (1327)
- Francesco de Boateriis, O.P. (1328–1333)
- Bartolommeo, O.P. (1333–1348)
- Pax (Pacio) (1348)
- Remigio, O.E.S.A. (1349–1357)
- Guglielmo (1357–1371)
- Teobaldo (1357–1381)
- Biagio de Fulgineo, O.Min. (1382– ) (Avignon Obedience)
- Federico Porcia (1381–1386) (Roman Obedience)
- Simone Saltarelli, O.P. (1386–1396) (Roman Obedience)
- Petrobuoni, O.S.B. (1396–1399?) (Roman Obedience)

=== since 1400 ===
- Onofrio Stecutti, O.E.S.A. (1400) (Roman Obedience)
- Giacomo Bertuzzi degli Obizzi (1402–1404) (Roman Obedience)
- Giovanni de Strada (de Pertegonibus) (1404– ) (Roman Obedience)
- Alberto Benedetti, O.Serv. (1418– )
- Maynard de Contrariis (1431–1449?)
- Bartolomeo de'Medici (1450?–1460?)
- Francesco Fogliano (1460–1471)
- Filippo de Zobolis (Zobale) (1472–1497)
- Meliadusius d'Este (1497–1506)
- Thomas Foschi (1506–1514)
- Ghillino Ghillini (1514–1559 Died)
- Alfonso Rossetti (1559 – 1563)
- Ercole Sacrati ( 1563–1591 Died)
- Orazio Giraldi (22 Apr 1592 – Jan 1617 Died)
- Alfonso Sacrati (12 Jun 1617 – 1626 Resigned)
- Camillo Moro (2 Mar 1626 – 10 May 1630 Died)
- Alfonse Pandolfi (12 May 1631 – Oct 1648 Died)
- Giulio Cesare Borea (28 Jun 1649 – 11 Mar 1655 Died)
- Sigismondo Isei (30 Aug 1655 – Sep 1670 Died)
- Nicolò d'Arcano (22 Dec 1670 – 1 Jan 1714 Died)
- Francesco Bentini (1714–1744)
- Giovanni Antonio Cavedi, O.F.M. (1744)
- Cristoforo Lugaresi (1745–1758)
- Giovanni Rondinelli (1758–1795)

Antonio Rossi (1777–1786) Vicar Apostolic
Alessandro Alessandretti (1786–1796) Vicar Apostolic

- Gregorio Boari, O.F.M. Cap. (1797–1817 Died)
- Michele Virgili (1819–1855 Died)
- Vincenzo Moretti (17 Dec 1855–1860)
- Fedele Bufarini (23 Mar 1860 – 1867 Resigned)
- Alessandro Paolo Spoglia (27 Mar 1867 – 15 Sep 1879 Resigned)
- Aloysius Pistocchi (19 Sep 1879 – 31 Mar 1883 Died)
- Tullio Sericci (9 Aug 1883 – 5 Jul 1902 Died)
- Alfonso Archi (10 Oct 1902 –1905)
- Annibale Lupi (14 Jul 1906 – 14 May 1908 Died)
- Giulio Boschi (7 Jan 1909 – 15 May 1920 Died)
- Gherardo Sante Menegazzi, O.F.M. Cap. (16 Dec 1920 – 1 Jul 1938 Resigned)
- Paolo Babini (12 Sep 1938 –1950)
- Natale Mosconi (28 May 1951 – 5 Aug 1954 Appointed, Archbishop of Ferrara)
- Giovanni Mocellini (26 Aug 1955 – 1 Jan 1969 Appointed, Bishop of Adria)
- Filippo Franceschi (15 Jul 1976 – 7 Jan 1982 Appointed, Archbishop (Personal Title) of Padua)
- Luigi Maverna (25 Mar 1982 – 30 Sep 1986 Appointed, Archbishop of Ferrara-Comacchio)

1986 Sep 30: Suppressed, territory assigned to the Roman Catholic Archdiocese of Ferrara-Comacchio

== See also ==
- Catholic Church in Italy

== Sources ==
=== Reference works ===
- Annuario Diocesano. Anno 2011. Arcidiocesi di Ferrara-Comacchio (in Italian). Ferrara: Archidiocesis Ferrariensis. 2011. pp. 34–36. GGKEY:THASS41GCLR.
- Gams, Pius Bonifatius (1873). Series episcoporum Ecclesiae catholicae: quotquot innotuerunt a beato Petro apostolo. Ratisbon: Typis et Sumptibus Georgii Josephi Manz. pp. 687–688. (in Latin)
- Eubel, Conradus, ed. (1913). Hierarchia catholica (in Latin). Vol. 1 (Tomus primus) (second ed.). Münster: Libreria Regensbergiana.
- Eubel, Conradus, ed. (1914). Hierarchia catholica (in Latin). Vol. 2 (Tomus secundus) (second ed.). Münster: Libreria Regensbergiana.
- Eubel, Conradus; Gulik, Guilelmus (1923). Hierarchia catholica (in Latin). Vol. Tomus 3 (second ed.). Münster: Libreria Regensbergiana.
- Gauchat, Patritius (Patrice) (1935). Hierarchia catholica (in Latin). Vol. 4 (Tomus IV) (1592-1667). Münster: Libraria Regensbergiana.
- Ritzler, Remigius; Sefrin, Pirminus (1952). Hierarchia catholica medii et recentis aevi V (1667-1730) (in Latin). Patavii: Messagero di S. Antonio.
- Ritzler, Remigius; Sefrin, Pirminus (1958). Hierarchia catholica medii et recentis aevi (in Latin). Vol. Tomus VI (1730-1799). Patavii: Messagero di S. Antonio.
- Ritzler, Remigius; Sefrin, Pirminus (1968). Hierarchia Catholica medii et recentioris aevi sive summorum pontificum, S. R. E. cardinalium, ecclesiarum antistitum series... A pontificatu Pii PP. VII (1800) usque ad pontificatum Gregorii PP. XVI (1846) (in Latin). Vol. VII. Monasterii: Libr. Regensburgiana.
- Remigius Ritzler; Pirminus Sefrin (1978). Hierarchia catholica Medii et recentioris aevi... A Pontificatu PII PP. IX (1846) usque ad Pontificatum Leonis PP. XIII (1903) (in Latin). Vol. VIII. Il Messaggero di S. Antonio.
- Pięta, Zenon (2002). Hierarchia catholica medii et recentioris aevi... A pontificatu Pii PP. X (1903) usque ad pontificatum Benedictii PP. XV (1922) (in Latin). Vol. IX. Padua: Messagero di San Antonio. ISBN 978-88-250-1000-8.

=== Studies ===
- Bellini, Luigi (1967). I vescovi di Comacchio nel primo millennio. Atti e memorie (Deputazione provinciale ferrarese di storia patria), ser. 3, v. 5. (in Italian). Ferrara.
- Cappelletti, Giuseppe (1844). Le chiese d'Italia della loro origine sino ai nostri giorni, vol. II, Venezia 1844. pp. 579–624. (in Italian)
- Cavalieri, Giuseppe Antonio (1779). Liber de Comaclensibus Episcopis (in Latin). Comacchio: Cavalerius.
- Ferro, Giovanni Francesco (1701). Istoria dell'antica città di Comacchio (in Italian). Ferrara: Pomatelli.
- Fontanini, Giusto (1709). Il dominio temporale della sede apostolica sopra la citta di Comacchio (in Italian). Roma.
- Kehr, Paul Fridolin (1906). Italia Pontificia Vol. V: Aemilia, sive Provincia Ravennas. Berlin: Weidmann. (in Latin).
- Lanzoni, Francesco (1898). Il primo vescovo di Comacchio, in Atti e memorie della regia deputazione di storia patria per le Provincie di Romagna, Terza serie, vol. XXVII, 1909, pp. 62–70
- Lanzoni, Francesco (1927). Le diocesi d'Italia dalle origini al principio del secolo VII (an. 604), vol. II, Faenza 1927, p. 819. (in Italian)
- Samaritani, A. (1961). Cronotassi dei vescovi di Comacchio. Padova (2' ed. in: « Bibliotheca ecclesiarum Italiae », I.) (in Italian)
- Simoni, Cesare (1908). Cronotassi dei vescovi di Comacchio. Faenza Montanari. (in Italian)
- Ughelli, Ferdinando; Coleti, Niccolò (1717). Italia sacra sive De Episcopis Italiae, et insularum adjacentium (in Latin). Venice: apud Sebastianum Coleti. pp. 481–489.
