= Termoli =

- Comune
- Comune di Termoli
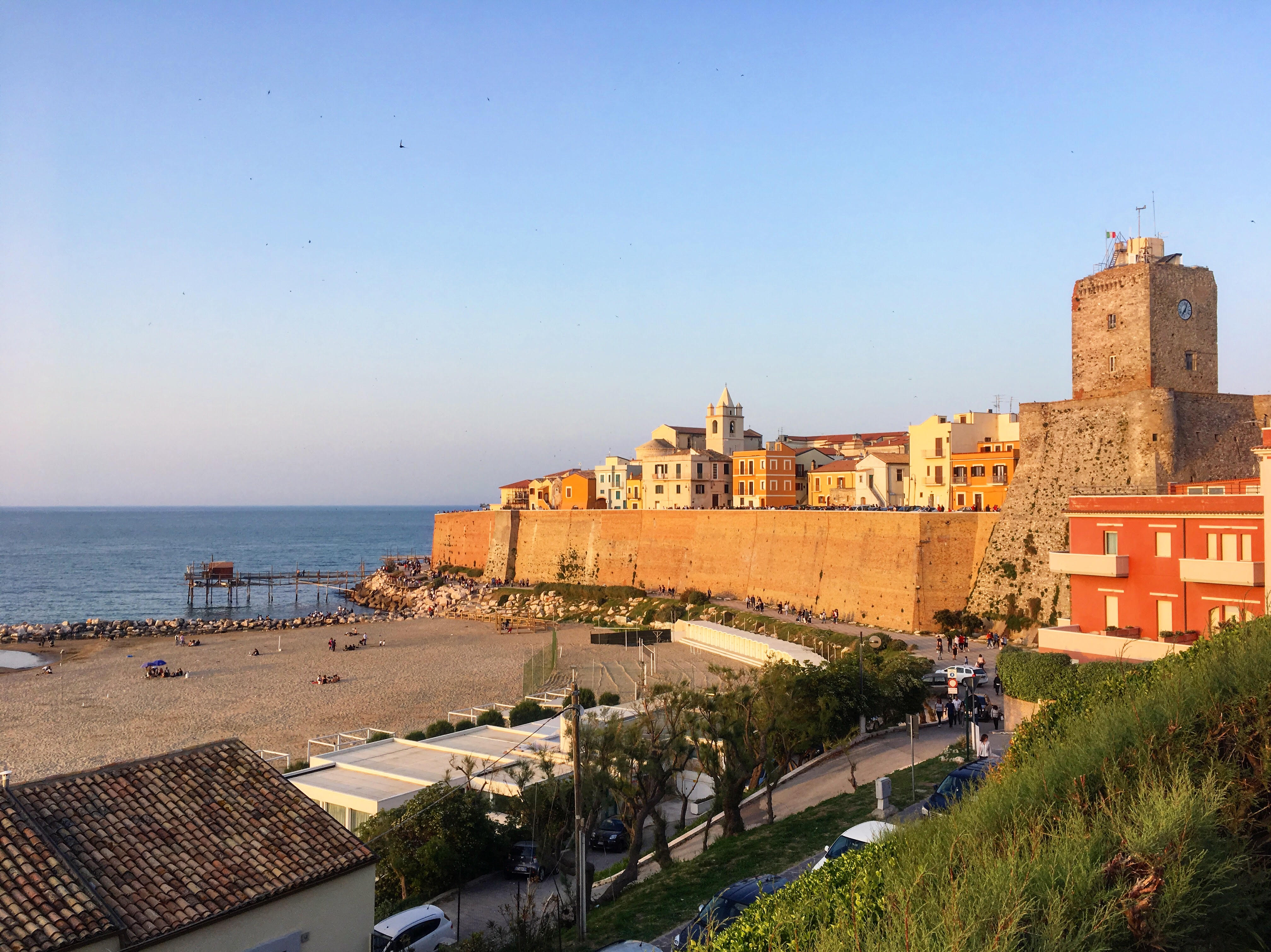
- Panorama of Termoli

- Flag Coat of arms

- Location within Italy Location within Molise
- Coordinates: 42°0′N 14°59′E
- Country: Italy
- Region: Molise
- Province: Campobasso (CB)

Government
  - Mayor: Nico Balice

Area
  - Total: 55.64 km^{2} (21.48 sq mi)
- Elevation: 15 m (49 ft)

Population (31 December 2017)
  - Total: 32,853
  - Density: 590.5/km^{2} (1,529/sq mi)
- Demonym: Termolesi
- Time zone: UTC+1 (CET)
  - Summer (DST): UTC+2 (CEST)
- Postal code: 86039
- Dialing code: 0875
- Patron saint: Saint Bassus (Basso), Saint Timothy
- Saint day: 3 and 4 August
- Website: Official website

Termoli (Molisano: Térmëlë) is a comune (municipality) on the south Adriatic coast of Italy, in the province of Campobasso, region of Molise. It has a population of around 32,000, having expanded quickly after World War II, and it is a local resort town known for its beaches and old fortifications. Termoli is served by the Ancona - Lecce railway line.

Once it was known only as a fishing port, but in the new millennium it is a favourite resort for Italian families. Termoli contains the only port of the Molise region. There is also a strong competition (especially in the world of sport) with the Campobasso province, in fact some of the "termolesi" (the name of the people that lives in Termoli) like to say that Termoli is province-less ("Termoli senza provincia").

== Geography ==
=== Location ===
Termoli is located in centre-south of Italy, on the Adriatic Coast of Molise Region. The original settlement developed on the promontory where now there's the ancient village, featured by old white and colorful fisherman houses, narrow streets, Trabucchi on the sea, the Romanesque Cathedral (Duomo), Castello Svevo (Frederick's Castle of 1200) and high walls.

The centre of the city is developed on the nearby ancient village, here you can find many avenues and streets full of life, especially in summer. On the seafront there are several restaurants, hotels and beaches; out of suburbs there are countrysides cultivated with olive trees and wine.

=== Climate ===
Termoli has a Mediterranean climate (CSa) tending to semi-arid (BSk) according to Köppen climate classification because precipitation is about 350 mm annual with the autumn as wettest season and a minimum in summer (less 20 mm in July and August).

Winters are mild but the city may experience windy days because of Maestrale (Mistral) which occasionally can bring snow, even if it is a rare phenomenon that occurs in the whole south Italy. Daily mean is about 10 °C (50 °F) with a maximum that can reach from 12 °C (54 °F) to 15 °C (59 °F), above all in days with winds from south and a minimum of 7 °C (46 °F).

Summers are long (they lasts 4 months) and quite hot but thanks to winds they are tolerable with an average high that can generally reach 29/30 °C (85/86 °F); in latest years, as a result of African anticyclone, temperatures were very high reaching 35/40 °C (95/104 °F) also due to southern hot winds from Africa.

In July and August nights are considered "tropicals" because the average low is about 24 °C. Rains are rare but sometimes there can be thunderstorms which doesn't contribute well to the dry situation of summer.

Climate data for Termoli (1991–2020)
Month	Jan	Feb	Mar	Apr	May	Jun	Jul	Aug	Sep	Oct	Nov	Dec	Year
Record high °C (°F)	24.4 (75.9)	25.0 (77.0)	40.0 (104.0)	29.8 (85.6)	34.8 (94.6)	41.6 (106.9)	41.6 (106.9)	40.8 (105.4)	39.0 (102.2)	33.0 (91.4)	28.4 (83.1)	24.2 (75.6)	41.6 (106.9)
Mean daily maximum °C (°F)	11.8 (53.2)	12.3 (54.1)	15.0 (59.0)	17.9 (64.2)	22.2 (72.0)	26.9 (80.4)	29.4 (84.9)	29.7 (85.5)	25.8 (78.4)	21.5 (70.7)	17.1 (62.8)	13.2 (55.8)	20.2 (68.4)
Daily mean °C (°F)	9.1 (48.4)	9.4 (48.9)	11.7 (53.1)	14.7 (58.5)	19.0 (66.2)	23.5 (74.3)	26.2 (79.2)	26.4 (79.5)	22.6 (72.7)	18.5 (65.3)	14.3 (57.7)	10.5 (50.9)	17.2 (63.0)
Mean daily minimum °C (°F)	6.8 (44.2)	6.9 (44.4)	9.0 (48.2)	11.8 (53.2)	16.1 (61.0)	20.5 (68.9)	23.2 (73.8)	23.5 (74.3)	19.6 (67.3)	15.8 (60.4)	11.8 (53.2)	8.2 (46.8)	14.4 (57.9)
Record low °C (°F)	−2.2 (28.0)	−2.8 (27.0)	−0.2 (31.6)	0.0 (32.0)	8.0 (46.4)	11.8 (53.2)	13.6 (56.5)	13.8 (56.8)	11.4 (52.5)	6.0 (42.8)	1.0 (33.8)	−1.0 (30.2)	−2.8 (27.0)
Average precipitation mm (inches)	31.29 (1.23)	20.67 (0.81)	23.40 (0.92)	28.63 (1.13)	24.31 (0.96)	16.84 (0.66)	19.50 (0.77)	19.60 (0.77)	48.38 (1.90)	45.11 (1.78)	49.59 (1.95)	34.37 (1.35)	361.69 (14.24)
Average precipitation days (≥ 1.0 mm)	6.17	5.00	4.67	4.97	4.47	3.13	2.37	3.03	5.47	6.07	7.30	7.47	60.12
Average relative humidity (%)	76.12	74.46	72.99	74.54	75.83	73.05	72.09	72.73	73.96	75.71	76.43	75.83	74.48
Average dew point °C (°F)	5.07 (41.13)	5.04 (41.07)	6.97 (44.55)	10.16 (50.29)	14.63 (58.33)	18.50 (65.30)	20.71 (69.28)	21.18 (70.12)	17.67 (63.81)	14.19 (57.54)	10.19 (50.34)	6.41 (43.54)	12.56 (54.61)
Mean monthly sunshine hours	136.40	155.96	205.53	221.70	263.50	288.00	323.02	303.18	225.30	186.00	141.90	137.64	2,588.13
Source: NOAA

== History ==
Human settlements existed in Termoli since pre-historical times, as showed by the presence of ancient necropolis in contrada Porticone and Difesa Grande, as well as from reconnaissance attestations of ville owned by Romans patricians that had their villa near the Molisan coast.

The first documentation of today's city dates to the presence of the ancestor of the current cathedral, documented in the 10th century. Termoli was a Lombard county until the arrival of the Normans, under which flourished and expanded. Later devastations meant a period of decay which lasted until around 1770, when the local nobles were permitted by the Kings of Naples to build new edifices along the coast and in direction of the countryside.

During World War II Termoli became the centre of one of the largest tank battles of the Italian campaign over the period 2 to 6 October, 1943. On the night of 2/3 October, during Operation Devon, British Commandos of the 2nd Special Service Brigade, which comprised No. 3 (Army) Commando, 40 (Royal Marine) Commando and the Special Raiding Squadron landed by sea then cleared the town of most of its German defenders. During the first day these forces set up road blocks around the town and were joined by British infantry advancing across the Biferno river to the south-east. They were unaware that the 16th Panzer Division was on its way to create a new defensive line. On 4 October British reinforcements arrived by sea and land, but tanks were unable to cross the river until engineers completed a bridge for heavy traffic. On 5 October the panzers attacked, pushing much of the British line back in disarray. At the end of the day they were only a short distance from the town. With the arrival of further reinforcements at the port, the engineers were able to complete the bridge allowing tanks to cross. On 6 October the Germans renewed their attack but it soon stalled and the British, with Canadian tanks from the Three Rivers Regiment (12^{e} Régiment blindé du Canada) in support, counter-attacked. They were successful and by 7 October the Germans were pulling back to their next line of defence.

Termoli is rapidly becoming one of the most important centres in the Molise. The latter region suffered from depopulation in the years after World War II and there has been a migration from the internal hill towns to the coastal resort. Its status as the pre-eminent resort site is now being challenged by Campomarino, about five kilometres (3.1 mi) southward.

== Main sights ==
=== Historical old town ===
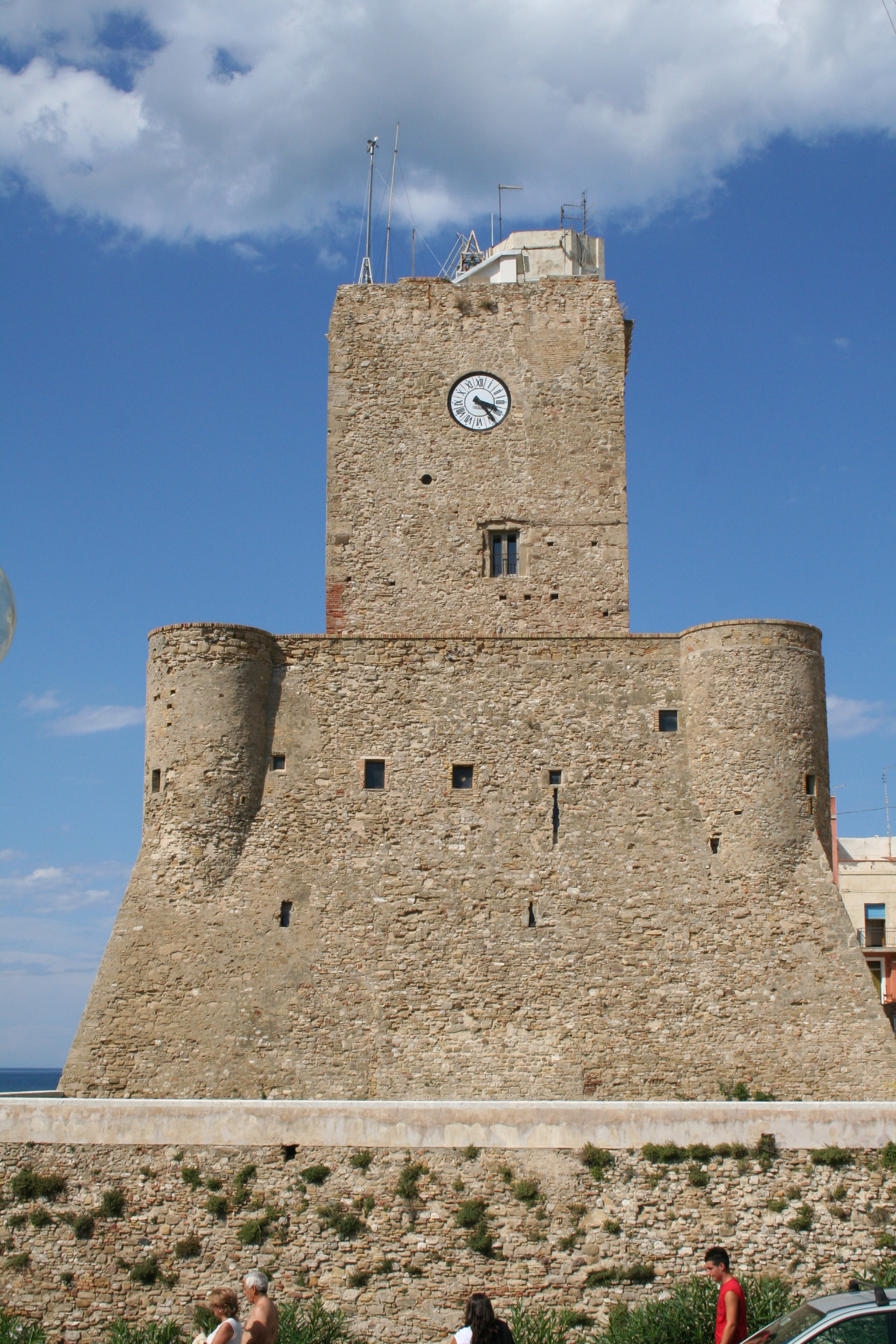
The Castle of Termoli

The old town has been well restored. It is a genuine walled community jutting out into the sea. Many of the houses have been re-built and painted in a range of pastel colours. In a central square there is the cathedral (12th-13th century), dedicated to St. Mary of the Purification: it is a noteworthy example of Apulian Romanesque architecture which houses the relics of the city's two patron saints, Bassus of Lucera (San Basso) and Timothy. The upper part of the façade was destroyed by an earthquake in 1456, and also suffered from the Turkish sack of the city in 1566. The Baroque additions were eliminated in the restoration of 1930–69, returning the edifice to its original appearance. Part of a pre-existing basilica, built in the 11th century (over the original, smaller cathedral called Ecclesia Sanctae Mater) but soon destroyed, has been found under the edifice.

The castle is the most pre-eminent structure in Termoli. Erected by count Robert I of Loritello during the Norman domination (11th century), it was largely renovated during the rule of Frederick II (1240), after the damage created by an attack of the Venetian fleet. The castle was part of a wider fortification system, including a wall surrounding the entire city, of which only a tower can still be seen.

=== Seaside resort ===
Termoli's resorts are renowned for the quality of their beaches and the relative purity of their waters.

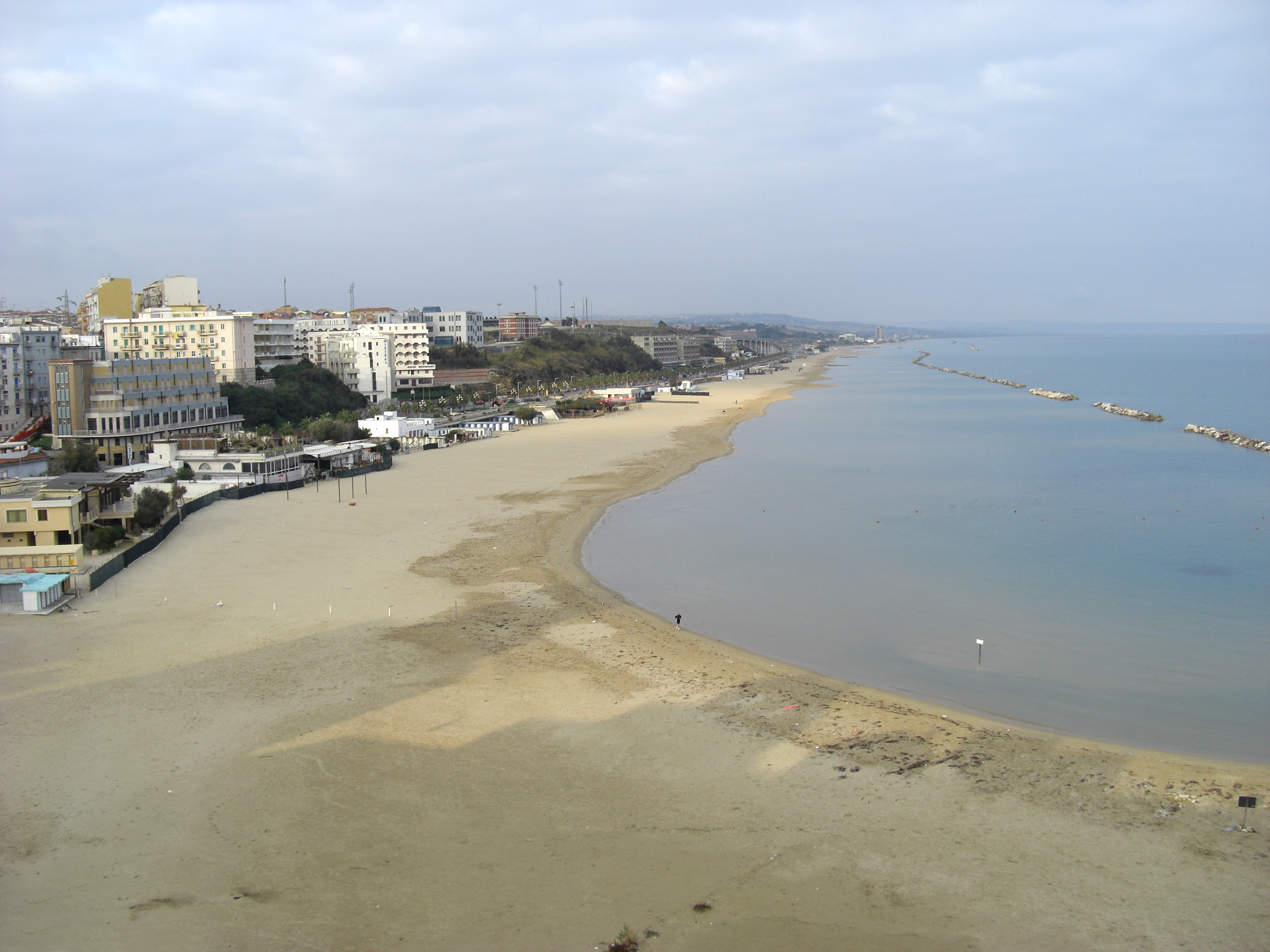
Beach in Termoli

Very few non-Italians come to stay in this area. Increasingly, the tourists to Molise are from the Naples and Apulia regions, to the south of Molise. Recently palm trees have been planted along the seaside promenade, and in the summer the many restaurants are crowded with visitors from surrounding communities.

Within a radius of about 25 kilometres (16 mi) from Termoli travellers can find the hilltowns of Larino, Casacalenda, Montorio, and Montelongo, which preserve a rural way of life which is disappearing in other, more developed, parts of Italy.

=== Port and fishing ===
Trabucco in Termoli

Termoli continues to be a port and a fishing town. A distinguishing feature of the old town are the trabucchi, wooden structures for fishing without the use of boats.

Ferries run from Termoli to the Tremiti Islands archipelago in the Adriatic Sea.

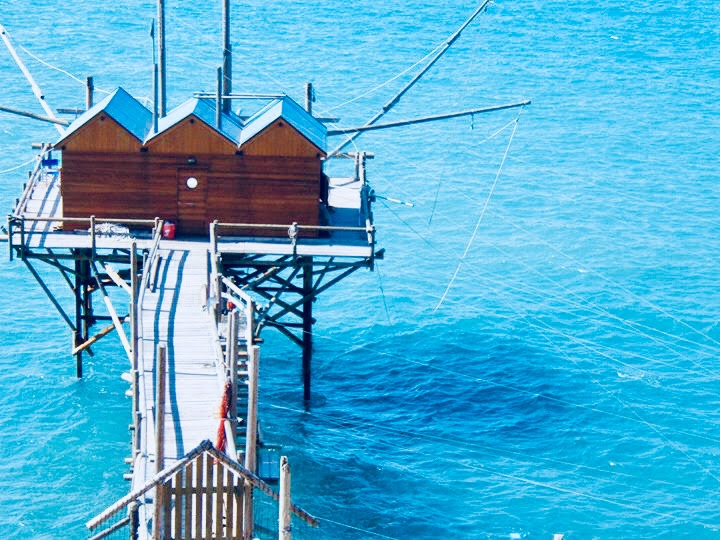
Trabucco

== Culture ==
Termoli hosts several cultural events.

The Kimera Film Festival was established in 2003. Starting from 2008, the public selection of the short movies is held in Termoli, from February to April of every year.

Termoli was also the location of the "Come Inside" video by Jamaican dancehall artist Spice.

Just like the neighboring settlements, Termoli has a Abrëshe population.

The ASD Termoli Calcio 1920 is a semi-professional football club founded in 1920 that currently plays in Serie D.

== Twin towns and sister cities ==
Termoli is twinned with:

- Chorzów, Poland
- (United States) Pompano Beach, Florida

== See also ==
- Molise Croats
