= Paolo Leoni =

Italian Roman Catholic bishop (died 1590)

Most Reverend Paolo Leoni
- Bishop of Ferrara
- Church: Catholic Church
- Diocese: Diocese of Ferrara
- In office: 1578–1590
- Predecessor: Alfonso Rossetti
- Successor: Giovanni Fontana

Orders
- Consecration: 4 May 1578 by Giulio Canani

Paolo Leoni (died 1590) was a Roman Catholic prelate who served as Bishop of Ferrara (1578–1590).

== Biography ==
On 17 March 1578, Paolo Leoni was appointed during the papacy of Pope Gregory XIII as Bishop of Ferrara. On 4 May 1578, he was consecrated bishop by Giulio Canani, Bishop of Adria, with Ercole Sacrati, Bishop of Comacchio, and Sisto Visdomini, Bishop of Modena, serving as co-consecrators. He served as Bishop of Ferrara until his death on 7 August 1590.

== External links and additional sources ==
- Cheney, David M. "Archdiocese of Ferrara-Comacchio". Catholic-Hierarchy.org. (for Chronology of Bishops) ^{[self-published]}
- Chow, Gabriel. "Archdiocese of Ferrara–Comacchio (Italy)". GCatholic.org. (for Chronology of Bishops) ^{[self-published]}

Catholic Church titles
Preceded by Alfonso Rossetti	Bishop of Ferrara; 1578–1590	Succeeded by Giovanni Fontana
