= Canani =

Canani is an Italian surname. Notable people with the surname include:

- Giulio Canani (1524–1592), Italian cardinal
- Julio Canani (1938–2021), Peruvian horse trainer
