= Giglio Gregorio Giraldi =

Italian scholar and poet

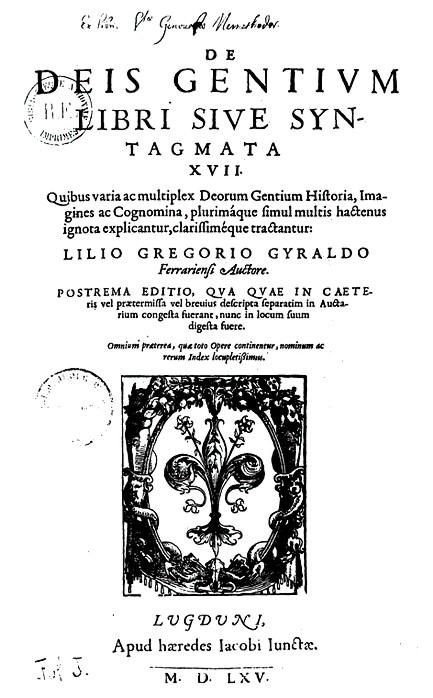
- De deis gentium, Lyon 1565
- Born: June 14, 1479; Ferrara, Duchy of Ferrara
- Died: February 1552 (aged 72); Ferrara, Duchy of Ferrara
- Occupations: Classical scholar and poet
- Parent(s): Giraldo Giraldi and Santa Giraldi

Academic background
- Education: University of Ferrara
- Academic advisors: Battista Guarino; Demetrios Chalkokondyles

Academic work
- Discipline: Ancient Greek and Latin literature, Classical mythology
- Doctoral students: Ercole Rangoni
- Notable works: De annis et mensibus caeterisque temporum partibus, 1541; De deis gentium, 1548

Giglio Gregorio Giraldi (Lilius Gregorius Gyraldus or Giraldus) (14 June 1479 – February 1552) was an Italian classical scholar and poet.

== Biography ==
Giglio Gregorio Giraldi was born at Ferrara, where he early distinguished himself by his talents and acquirements. On the completion of his literary course, he removed to Naples, where he lived on familiar terms with Jovianus Pontanus and Sannazaro; and subsequently to Lombardy, where he enjoyed the favour of the Mirandola family. At Milan in 1507 he studied Greek under Chalcondylas; and shortly afterwards, at Modena, he became tutor to Ercole (afterwards Cardinal) Rangone.

About the year 1514, he removed to Rome, where, under Clement VII, he held the office of apostolic protonotary; but having in the sack of that city (1527), which almost coincided with the death of his patron Cardinal Rangone, lost all his property, he returned in poverty once more to Mirandola, whence again he was driven by the troubles consequent on the assassination of the reigning prince in 1533.

The rest of his life was one long struggle with ill-health, poverty and neglect; and he is alluded to with sorrowful regret by Montaigne in one of his Essais (i.35), as having, like Sebastian Castalio, ended his days in utter destitution. He died at Ferrara in February 1552, and his epitaph makes touching and graceful allusion to the sadness of his end.

Giraldi was a man of very extensive erudition, and numerous testimonies to his profundity and accuracy have been given both by contemporary and by later scholars. His Historia de deis gentium (1548) marked a distinctly forward step in the systematic study of classical mythology; and by his treatises De annis et mensibus, and on the Calendarium Romanum et Graecum, he contributed to bring about the reform of the calendar, which was ultimately effected by Pope Gregory XIII.

His Progymnasma adversus literas et literatos deserves mention at least among the curiosities of literature, and among his other works to which reference is still occasionally made are Historiae poëtarum Graecorum ac Latinorum; De poëtis suorum temporum; and De sepultura ac vario sepeliendi ritu. Giraldi was also an elegant Latin poet.

His Opera omnia was published at Leiden in 1696.

== Works ==
- [Opere] (in Latin). Vol. 1. Leiden: Jacobus Hackius & Cornelis Boutesteyn & Johannes Du Vivie & Pieter van der Aa (1.) & Jordaan Luchtmans. 1696.
  - [Opere] (in Latin). Vol. 2. Leiden: Jacobus Hackius & Cornelis Boutesteyn & Johannes Du Vivie & Pieter van der Aa (1.) & Jordaan Luchtmans. 1696.
