= Pigna =

Pigna is the Italian word for pine cone and may refer to:

== Places ==
Australia

- Pigna Barney River, a partly perennial river of the Manning River catchment, in the Upper Hunter district of New South Wales

France

- Pigna, Haute-Corse, a commune in the Département of Haut-Corse, Corsica

Italy

- Pigna, Lazio, a rione in the City of Rome
- Pigna, Liguria, a comune in the province of Imperia

== People ==
- Felipe Pigna, an Argentine historian
- Giovan Battista Pigna, an Italian humanist and poet

== Brands ==
- Pigna, an Italian stationary brand

== See also ==
- Fontana della Pigna
