= Archdiocese of Ferrara-Comacchio =

Roman Catholic archdiocese in Italy

Archdiocese of Ferrara-Comacchio Archidioecesis Ferrariensis-Comaclensis

Catholic
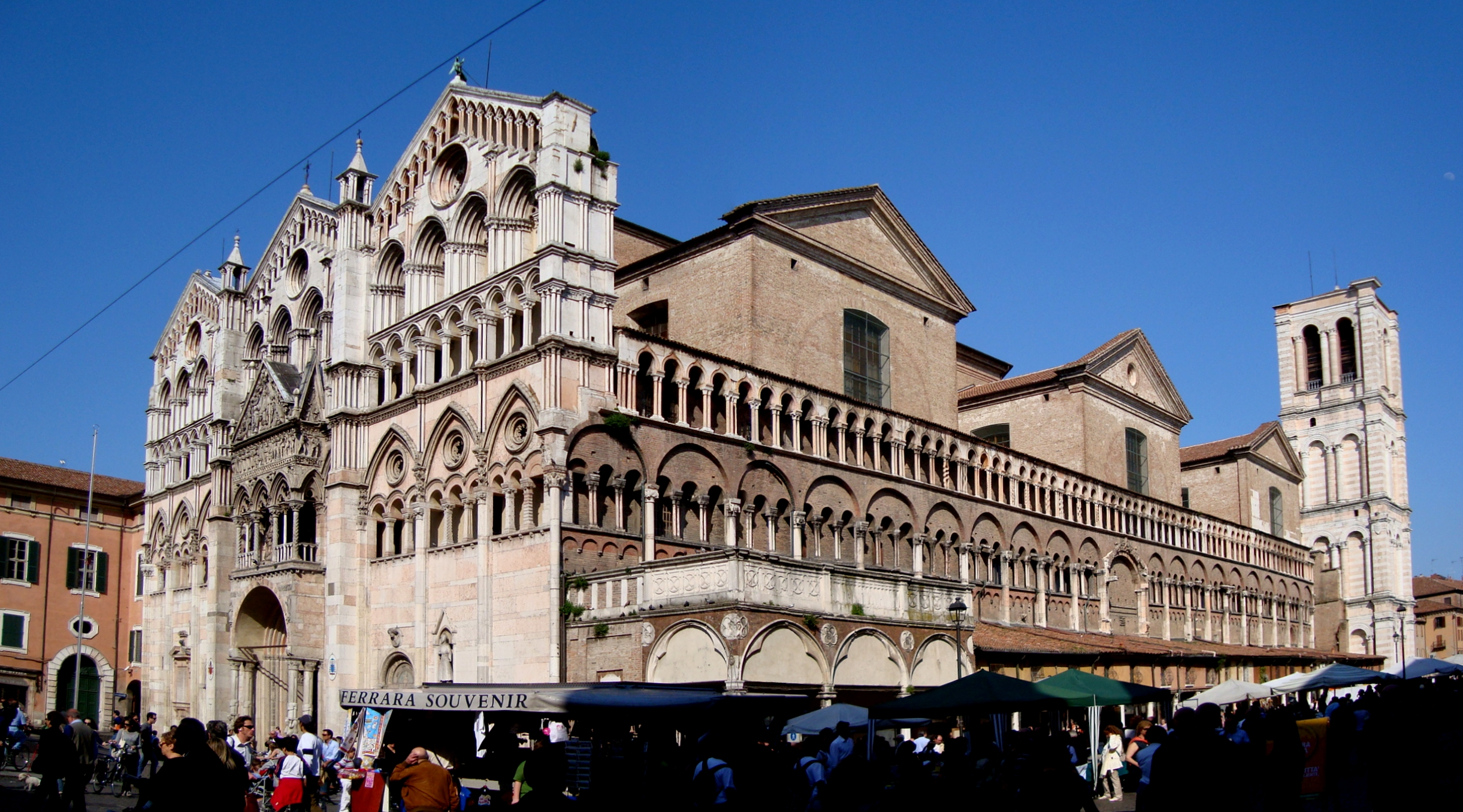
- Cathedral in Ferrara

Location
- Country: Italy
- Ecclesiastical province: Bologna

Statistics
- Area: 3,138 km^{2} (1,212 sq mi)
- Population: Total; Catholics: (as of 2023); 267,300 (est.) ▼; 265,190 (est.) ▼
- Parishes: 173 ▲

Information
- Denomination: Catholic Church
- Rite: Roman Rite
- Established: 7th Century
- Cathedral: Basilica Cattedrale di S. Giorgio (Ferrara)
- Co-cathedral: Concattedrale di S. Cassiano Martire (Comacchio)
- Secular priests: 122 (Diocesan) ▼16 (Religious Orders) ▼25 Permanent Deacons ▲

Current leadership
- Pope: Leo XIV
- Archbishop: Giancarlo Perego
- Bishops emeritus: Paolo Rabitti

Map
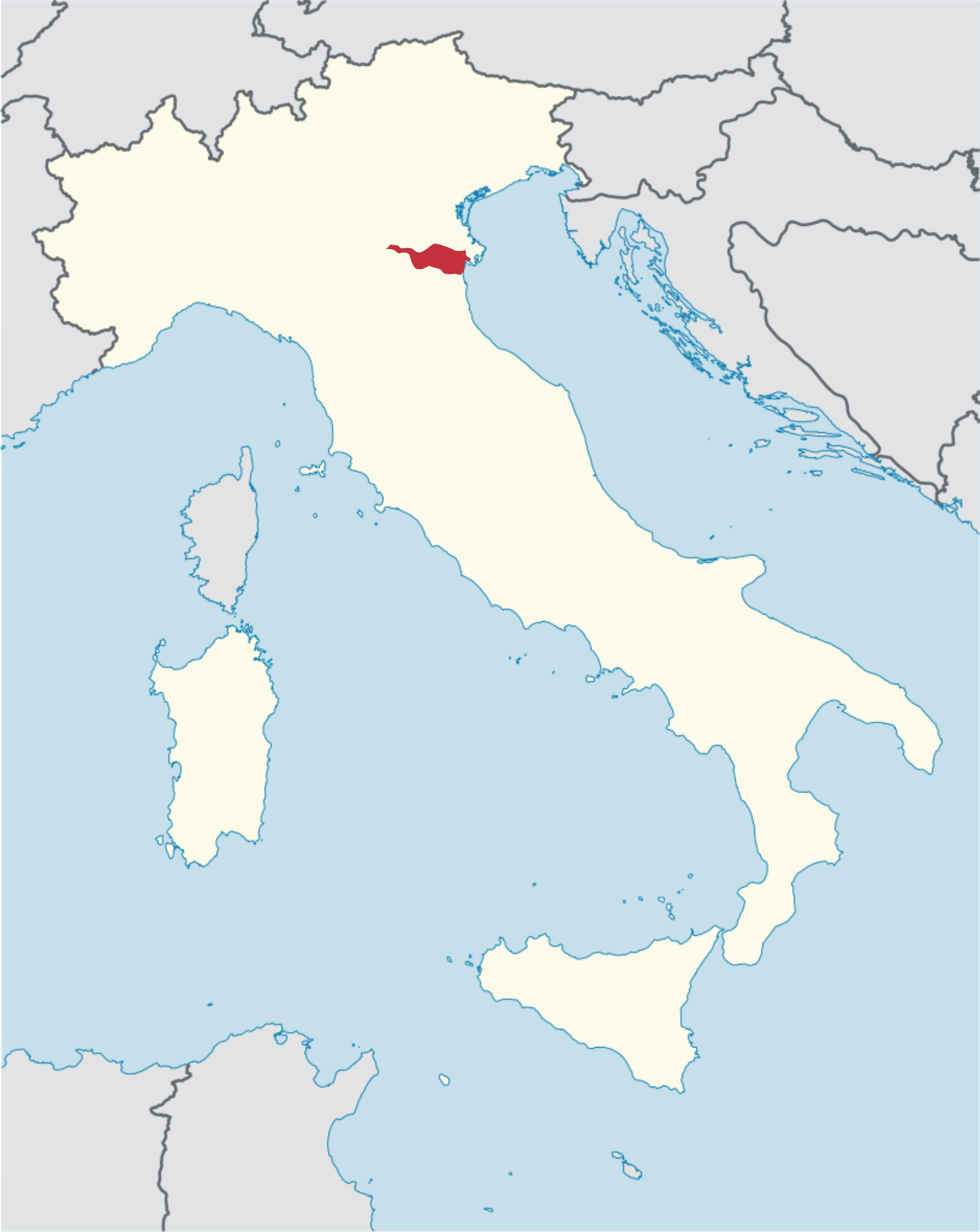

Website
- arcidiocesiferraracomacchio.org

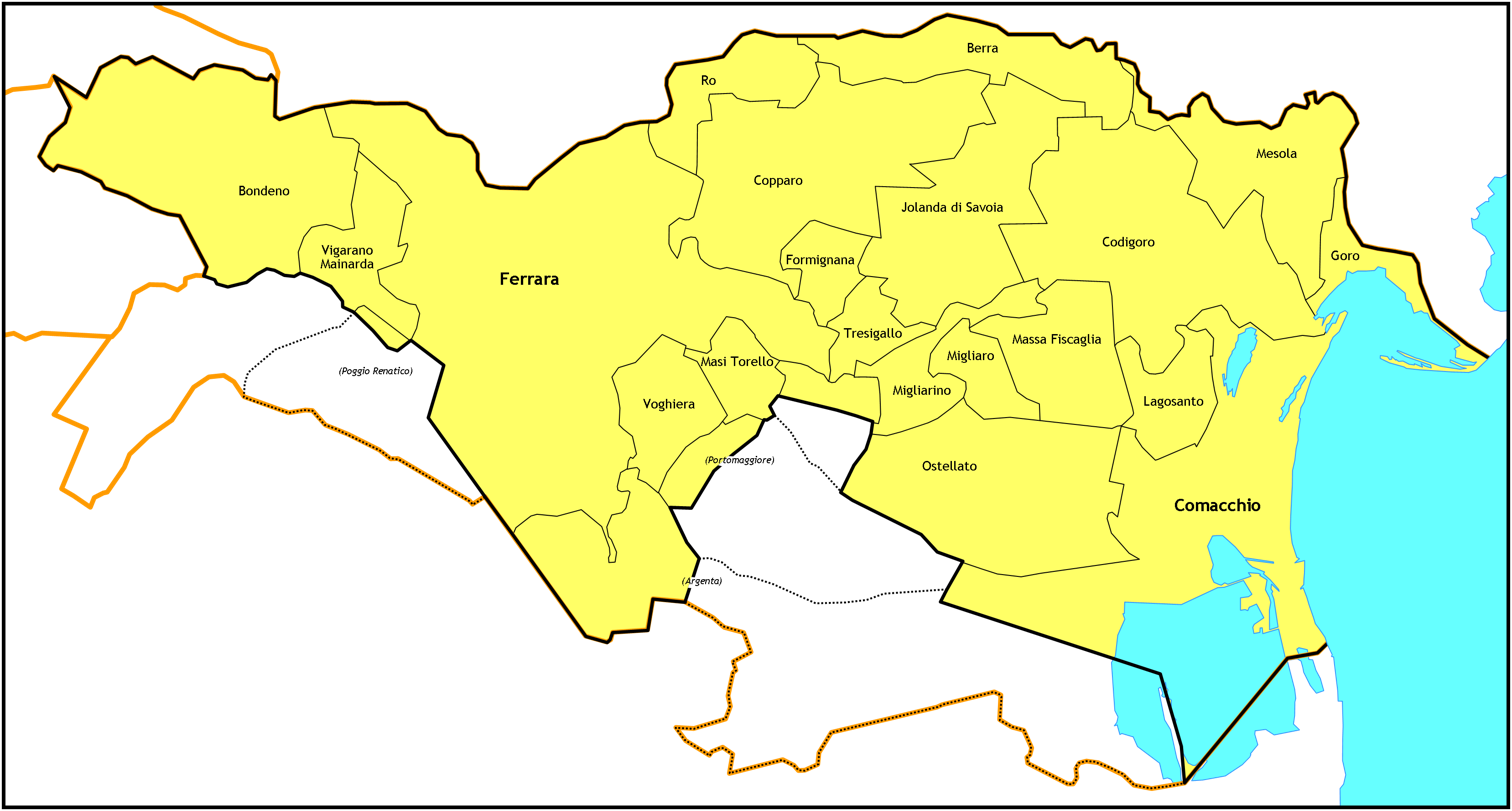
Subdivisions of the diocese of Ferrara

The Archdiocese of Ferrara-Comacchio (Latin: Archidioecesis Ferrariensis-Comaclensis) is a Latin Church archdiocese of the Catholic Church. It has existed since 1986, when the diocese of Comacchio was combined with the historical archdiocese of Ferrara. It is a suffragan of the archdiocese of Bologna.

The episcopal seat was transferred from Vicohabentia (Voghenza) to the newly founded Ferrara in 657. The earliest known bishop of Vicohabentia is Marcellinus, who was consecrated c. 429–431.

== Suffragan and Metropolitan ==
Originally, it seems, the diocese (or at least the diocese of Vicohabentia) was a suffragan of the metropolitanate of Ravenna. Ferrara repeatedly contested that opinion, and claimed to be directly dependent upon the Holy See (the Pope). Pope John XIII, in April 967, confirmed that Ferrara was under papal jurisdiction, as far as election, consecration, investiture, and jurisdiction were concerned. Pope Benedict VII, in April 978, again confirmed the papal jurisdiction in much the same language. At some point between 1106 and 1123, however, the diocese of Ferrara fell under the control of the metropolitan of Ravenna, and Bishop Landolfo was suspended from office because of his refusal to submit to Archbishop Walter of Ravenna. Pope Innocent II restored the original independence of the diocese of Ferrara on 11 March 1133; but on the death of Bishop Landolfo in 1138, the Archbishop of Ravenna asserted the right to consecrate his successor. The Ferrarese were required to produce their documentary proofs before the Pope, who issued a decree in favor of Ferrara as directly dependent upon the Holy See on 22 April 1139.

Ferrara became an archdiocese, though without suffragans, by the Bull Paterna pontificii of Pope Clement XII on 27 July 1735. Pope Clement goes out of his way to state that the diocese had always been directly subject to the Holy See, citing the decree Ad hoc of Pope Innocent II at the Lateran Council of 1139, and recalling subsequent similar rulings of Celestine II, Lucius II, Gregory VIII, Clement III, Celestine III, Innocent IV, Alexander VIII, Innocent XII, and Clement XI. This fortunate arrangement continued until 1976. In a decree of the Vatican Sacred Congregation of Bishops of 8 December 1976, a new arrangement of certain dioceses in ecclesiastical provinces was announced; the diocese of Ferrara was made a suffragan of the Archbishop of Bologna, though the Archbishop of Ferrara was allowed to keep the title of archbishop.

As part of a project begun on orders from Pope John XXIII, and continued under his successors, to reduce the number of dioceses in Italy and to rationalize their borders in terms of modern population changes and shortages of clergy, the diocese of Comacchio was united to the diocese of Ferrara by a decree of the Sacred Congregation of Bishops, on 30 September 1986. There was to be one bishop, and one curia, one cathedral, one Council of Consultors and one Council of Priests, and one seminary. The former cathedral of Comacchio was granted the title of Co-cathedral, and its Chapter was retained and not united with the Chapter of the Cathedral of Ferrara.

The old diocesan name of Vicohabentia (Voghenza) was revived in 1967, as a titular see. It has been held by an auxiliary bishop of Cortona and an auxiliary bishop of Rome.

== History ==
The earliest bishop of certain date is Constantinus Ferrariensis, who was present at the Roman Synod of Pope Nicholas I in 861. The synod had been summoned to deal with the case of Bishop John of Ravenna, who had excommunicated innocent persons and opposed pious works, and who, after having been admonished and summoned to a synod, refused to appear. St. Maurelius (not M. Aurelius), Bishop of Vicohabentia and patron of the city of Ferrara, must have lived before this time. His legend is treated by Daniel Papenbroch, in the Acta Sanctorum Some think that the bishops of Ferrara are the successors to those of Voghenza (the ancient Vicus Haventia).

On 25 March 1210, the Emperor Otto IV, residing at Ferrara, issued an edict against heretics in Ferrara: ...omnes hereticos Ferrarie commorantes, Patharenos sive Gazaros, Imperiali banno subjacere...et domus destruantur.

Pope Alexander III visited Ferrara during his Venetian trip, from 10 April to 9 May 1177. At the end of his visit, on 8 May, he dedicated the High Altar in the cathedral.

Pope Urban III died at Ferrara on 20 October 1187, only a month after having escaped from Verona, where he was being besieged by Frederick Barbarossa. He was buried in the cathedral. The Conclave to elect his successor began (and ended) on the next day with the election of Cardinal Alberto di Morro, who took the name Pope Gregory VIII. He left Ferrara for Rome on November 16, and died at Pisa on 17 December 1187.

Bishop Niccolò Roberti (1393–1401) was the son of Cabrino de' Roberti da Reggio and his wife Margherita del Sale, and grandson of Filippo de' Roberti da Troia. The bishop had two brothers, Filippo and Alberto, and a sister Giovanna, who was married to Alberto d'Este, Marquis of Ferrara (died 1393). Suddenly, on 22 January 1400, Alberto's son, Niccolò III d'Este, Marquis of Ferrara, ordered the arrest of Alberto de' Roberti, the President of the Council; his brother Filippo; their mother Margherita; and Marco de' Pii da Carpi, who was married to the Bishop's sister Taddea. Alberto and Margherita's property was confiscated, and both were beheaded on 6 March 1400. The Bishop's brother Filippo was sent into exile, and Marco Pio was kept in prison. Bishop Niccolò was deposed from his bishopric, though Pope Boniface IX issued a decree vouching for his absolute innocence. The cause of the Marchese's violent actions is unknown.

On 8 January 1438, Pope Eugene IV opened the seventeenth ecumenical council in Ferrara, but the plague of 1439 compelled him to move the sessions to Florence.

=== Cathedral and Chapter ===
The Cathedral of San Giorgio was begun in 1132, and consecrated in 1135 by Bishop Landolfo (1105–1138/1139), with the participation of the Papal Legate in Bologna, Cardinal Azzo. The High Altar was consecrated by Pope Alexander III on 18 May 1177. It also served as a parish church, and the Archpriest of the Cathedral Chapter served as the pastor of the congregation. In 1735, when the diocese became a metropolitanate with an Archbishop, the Cathedral became a metropolitan cathedral. It was granted the title and privileges of a Minor Basilica by Pope John XXIII on 13 November 1959.

Pope Paul III visited the city of Ferrara along with seventeen cardinals in April 1543. At the Solemn Mass held in the cathedral on 24 April, the Feast of Saint George, he granted to all the Canons the right to call themselves Monsignor.

In 1746, the Chapter of the Cathedral was composed of seven dignities and thirteen Canons. The dignities were: the Archpriest, the Provost, the Archdeacon, the Primicerius, the Custos, the Treasurer, and the Dean.

The Chapter was abolished on the Feast of Corpus Christi, 1798, in accordance with French laws, which had come into force in the Cisalpine Republic. It was restored in 1799, but abolished again in 1800. Napoleon restored the Chapter by a decree of 8 June 1805, but also reordered its composition. According to his orders, there were to be: the Archpriest, the Provost, the Treasurer, the Theologus, the Penitentiary, and ten additional Canons. The arrangement still holds good, with the addition of Honorary Canons, currently five in number, with two Emeriti and three Supernumerarii; there are also seven Mansionarii, each with a five-year term.

On 12 April 1530 a new set of Statutes was approved for the Cathedral Chapter, Reverendi Capituli Dominorum Canonicorum Ecclesiae Ferrariensis nova Statuta anno 153o die XII mensis Aprilis condita.

=== Seminary ===
The Council of Trent, in its 23rd Session, meeting on 15 July 1563, issued a decree, the 18th chapter of which required that every diocese have a seminary for the training of clergy.

The seminary of the diocese of Ferrara was founded by Bishop Paolo Leoni (1578–1590), in accordance with the decrees of the Council of Trent, and opened on 22 July 1584. In 1723, Cardinal Tommaso Ruffo (1717–1738) purchased the Palazzo Costabili-Trotti, to which he transferred the personnel of the seminary in 1724. In 1755, Cardinal Marcello Crescenzi (1694–1768) added the Palazzo Libanori-Guastavillari. The seminary was closed in 1798 by the French occupation officials, though it was allowed to reopen in the next year. In 1955, the seminary moved to its present quarters, a completely modern building.

=== Synods ===
A diocesan synod was an irregular but important meeting of the bishop of a diocese and his clergy. Its purpose was (1) to proclaim generally the various decrees already issued by the bishop; (2) to discuss and ratify measures on which the bishop chose to consult with his clergy; (3) to publish statutes and decrees of the diocesan synod, of the provincial synod, and of the Holy See.

In 1278 Bishop Guglielmo held a synod (Cleri Conventus), and on 9 December issued a set of Statutes.

Bishop Guido held a diocesan synod in 1332 and published its Statutes and those of his predecessors which he had collected. It included a section on sorcerers (xliii), who were subject to excommunication.

On 27 February 1579, Bishop Paolo Leoni held a synod in Ferrara. He held another in 1588; and another on 12 April 1589. Diocesan synods were held by Bishop Giovanni Fontana in 1590, 1591, 16 April 1592, 1593, 1594, 1595, 1596, 1587, and 1599.

Cardinal Leni held a diocesan synod in 1612. Cardinal Magalotti held a synod in 1637. Cardinal Stefano Donghi held his first synod in Ferrara in 1666.

Cardinal Taddeo del Verme held a diocesan synod in Ferrara in 1711. Cardinal Thomas Ruffo held a diocesan synod in 1726. A diocesan synod was held by Cardinal Marcello Crescenzi in June 1751. Cardinal Alessandro Mattei held a diocesan synod in 1781.

=== Parishes and churches ===
There are 171 parishes in the diocese. In addition there are 20 churches in the city of Ferrara which are not parishes; 2 in Comacchio; and 10 elsewhere in the diocese.

== Bishops and Archbishops ==
=== Diocese of Ferrara ===
...

- Viator (attested 881)

...

- Leo (attested 970, 981)
- Gregorius (attested 988, 998)
- Ingo (Ingone)
- Ambrosius
- Rolandus (attested 1046)
- Gratianus
- Guido

...

- Landolfo (1105–1138/1139)
- Grifo (c. 1139 – after 1155)
- Amatus (c. 1158 – c. 1173)
- Presbiterinus (attested 1175, 1181)
- Teobaldus (attested 1184, 1186)
- Stephanus (1186–1189)
- Uguccione (1190–1210)

Sede vacante (1210–1214)

Giordano Forzatè, elected 1211

- Rotlandus (1214–1231)
- Gravendinus (Garsendinus) (1231–1237) Bishop Elect
- Filippo Fontana (1239–1249)
- Giovanni Quarini (1252–1257)
- Alberto Pandoni, O.E.S.A. (1257–1274)
- Guglielmo (1274 – after 1286)
- Federico de'Conti di San Martino (1289–1303)

[Ottobono del Carretto (1304)]

- Guido, O.P. (1304–1332)
- Guido da Baisio (1332–1349)
- Filippo d'Antella (1349–1357)
- Bernardo de la Bussière (1357–1371)

Sede Vacante (1372–1377)

Cardinal Pierre d'Estaing, O.S.B.Clun. (1371–1374) Administrator

- Aldobrandino d'Este (1377–1381)
- Guido da Baisio (1382–1383)
- Tommaso Marcapesci (1384–1392)
- Niccolò Roberti (1393–1401)
- Pietro Bojardi (24 Jan 1401 – Dec 1431 Resigned)
- Giovanni Tossignano (29 Oct 1431 Appointed – 24 Jul 1446 Died)
- Francesco Legnamine (de Padua) (8 Aug 1446 – 18 Apr 1460)
- Lorenzo Roverella (26 Mar 1460 – 1474 Died)
- Bartolommeo della Rovere, O.F.M. (1474–1494)
- Cardinal Juan de Borja Lanzol (1494–1503)
- Cardinal Ippolito d'Este (8 Oct 1503 – 3 Sep 1520) Administrator
- Cardinal Giovanni Salviati (12 Sep 1520 – 1 May 1550 Resigned) Administrator
- Luigi d'Este (1 May 1550 – 1563 Resigned) Administrator
- Alfonso Rossetti (1563–1577)
- Paolo Leoni (17 Mar 1578 – 7 Aug 1590 Died)
- Giovanni Fontana (7 Aug 1590 – 5 Jul 1611)
- Cardinal Giaovanni Battista Leni (1611–1627)
- Cardinal Lorenzo Magalotti (1628–1637)
- Cardinal Francesco Maria Macchiavelli (1638–1653)
- Cardinal Carlo Pio di Savoia (2 Aug 1655 – 26 Feb 1663 Resigned)
- Cardinal Giovanni Stefano Donghi (26 Feb 1663 – 26 Nov 1669 Died)
- Carlo Cerri (19 May 1670 – 14 May 1690 Died)
- Marcello Durazzo (27 Nov 1690 – 27 Aug 1691)
- Domenico Tarugi (2 Jan 1696 – 27 Dec 1696 Died)
- Fabrizio Paolucci (27 Jan 1698 – 14 Mar 1701 Resigned)
- Taddeo Luigi dal Verme (14 Mar 1701 – 12 Jan 1717 Died)
- Tommaso Ruffo (10 May 1717 – 26 Apr 1738 Resigned)

=== Archdiocese of Ferrara ===
Elevated: 27 July 1735
Immediately Subject to the Holy See

- Raniero d'Elci (5 May 1738 – 15 Sep 1740 Resigned)
- Bonaventura Barberini, O.F.M. Cap. (16 Sep 1740 – 15 Oct 1743 Died)
- Girolamo Crispi (16 Dec 1743 – 24 Jul 1746 Died)
- Marcello Crescenzi (22 Aug 1746 – 24 Aug 1768)
- Bernardino Giraud (15 Mar 1773 – 14 Feb 1777 Resigned)
- Alessandro Mattei (17 Feb 1777 – 2 Apr 1800)

Vacant (1800–1807)

- Paolo Patricio Fava Ghisleri (24 Aug 1807 – 14 Aug 1822)
- Carlo Odescalchi, S.J. (10 Mar 1823 – 2 Jul 1826 Resigned)
- Filippo Filonardi (3 Jul 1826 – 3 May 1834)
- Gabriele della Genga Sermattei (23 Jun 1834 – 13 Jan 1843 Resigned)
- Ignazio Giovanni Cadolini (30 Jan 1843 – 11 Apr 1850 Died)
- Luigi Vannicelli Casoni (20 May 1850 – 21 Apr 1877 Died)
- Luigi Giordani (22 Jun 1877 – 21 Apr 1893 Died)
- Egidio Mauri, O.P. (12 Jun 1893 – 13 Mar 1896 Died)
- Pietro Respighi (30 Nov 1896 – 9 Apr 1900 Appointed, Vicar General of Rome)
- Giulio Boschi (19 Apr 1900 – 7 Jan 1919 Resigned)
- Francesco Rossi (15 Dec 1919 – 25 Jul 1929 Died)
- Ruggero Bovelli (4 Oct 1929 – 9 Jun 1954 Died)
- Natale Mosconi (5 Aug 1954 – 21 Apr 1976 Resigned)
- Filippo Franceschi (15 Jul 1976 – 7 Jan 1982 Appointed, Archbishop (Personal Title) of Padua)
- Luigi Maverna (25 Mar 1982 – 8 Sep 1995 Retired)

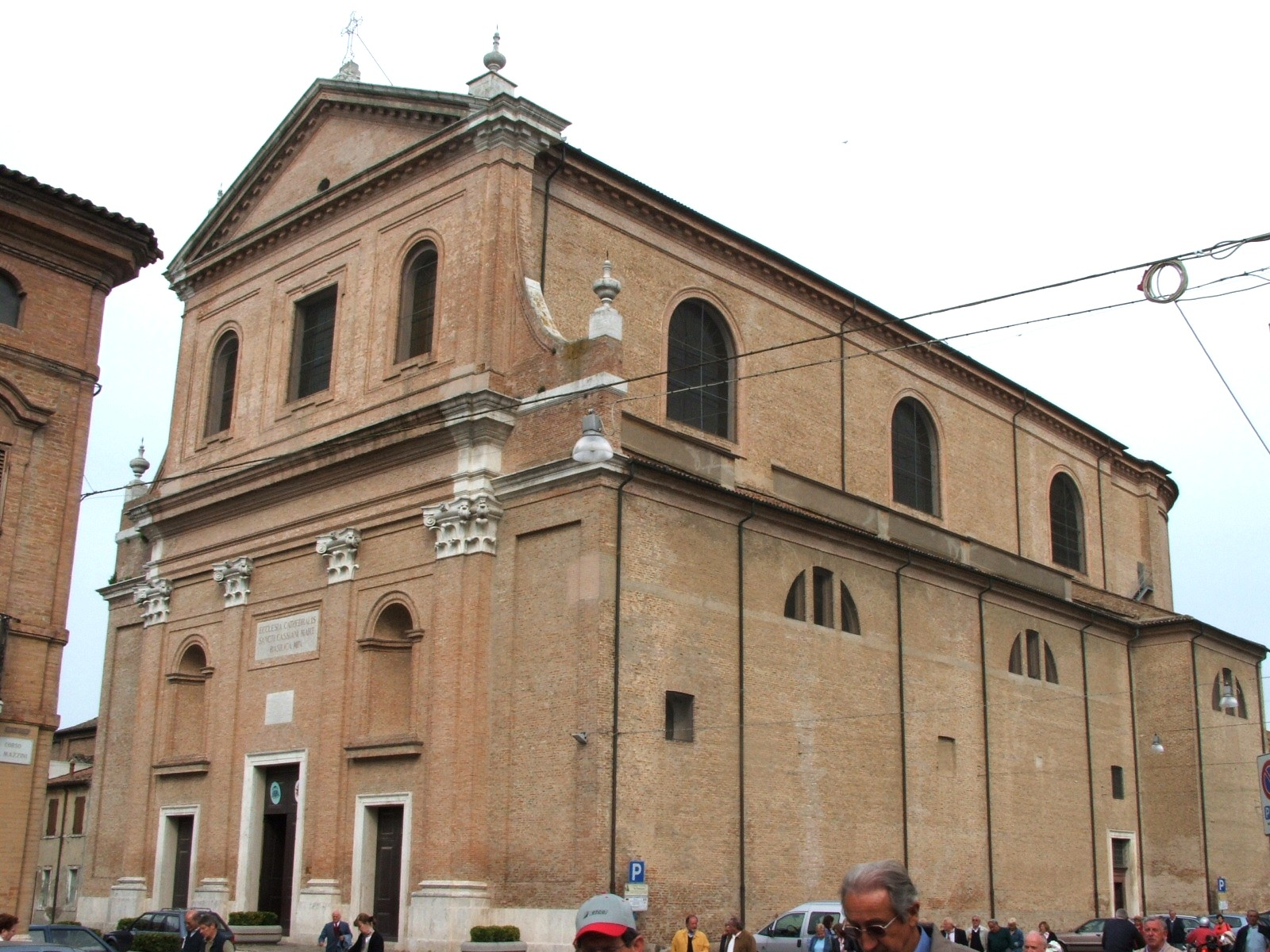
Cathedral in Comacchio

=== Archdiocese of Ferrara-Comacchio ===
United: 30 September 1986 with the Diocese of Comacchio (-Pomposa)
Latin Name: Ferrariensis-Comaclensis
Metropolitan: Archdiocese of Bologna

- Carlo Caffarra (8 Sep 1995 – 16 Dec 2003 Appointed, Archbishop of Bologna)
- Paolo Rabitti (2 Oct 2004 – 1 Dec 2012 Retired)
- Luigi Negri (1 December 2012 – 15 February 2017 Retired)
- Giancarlo Perego (15 Feb 2017)

== See also ==
- Roman Catholic Diocese of Comacchio

== Bibliography ==
=== Reference works ===
- Gams, Pius Bonifatius (1873). Series episcoporum Ecclesiae catholicae: quotquot innotuerunt a beato Petro apostolo. Ratisbon: Typis et Sumptibus Georgii Josephi Manz. pp. 816–817. (in Latin)
- Eubel, Conradus, ed. (1913). Hierarchia catholica. Vol. Tomus 1 (second ed.). Münster: Libreria Regensbergiana. (in Latin)
- Eubel, Conradus, ed. (1914). Hierarchia catholica. Vol. Tomus 2 (second ed.). Münster: Libreria Regensbergiana. (in Latin)
- Eubel, Conradus, ed. (1923). Hierarchia catholica. Vol. Tomus 3 (second ed.). Münster: Libreria Regensbergiana. (in Latin)
- Gauchat, Patritius (Patrice) (1935). Hierarchia catholica. Vol. Tomus IV (1592-1667). Münster: Libraria Regensbergiana. (in Latin)
- Ritzler, Remigius; Sefrin, Pirminus (1952). Hierarchia catholica medii et recentis aevi V (1667-1730). Patavii: Messagero di S. Antonio.
- Ritzler, Remigius; Sefrin, Pirminus (1958). Hierarchia catholica medii et recentis aevi. Vol. Tomus VI (1730-1799). Patavii: Messagero di S. Antonio. (in Latin)
- Ritzler, Remigius; Sefrin, Pirminus (1968). Hierarchia Catholica medii et recentioris aevi sive summorum pontificum, S. R. E. cardinalium, ecclesiarum antistitum series... A pontificatu Pii PP. VII (1800) usque ad pontificatum Gregorii PP. XVI (1846) (in Latin). Vol. VII. Monasterii: Libr. Regensburgiana.
- Remigius Ritzler; Pirminus Sefrin (1978). Hierarchia catholica Medii et recentioris aevi... A Pontificatu PII PP. IX (1846) usque ad Pontificatum Leonis PP. XIII (1903) (in Latin). Vol. VIII. Il Messaggero di S. Antonio.
- Pięta, Zenon (2002). Hierarchia catholica medii et recentioris aevi... A pontificatu Pii PP. X (1903) usque ad pontificatum Benedictii PP. XV (1922) (in Latin). Vol. IX. Padua: Messagero di San Antonio. ISBN 978-88-250-1000-8.

=== Studies ===
- Balboni, Dante (1967). Dictionnaire d'histoire et de géographie écclesiastiques, 16 (1967) sub voce "Ferraria", coll. 1192–98, corretto da Antonio Samaritani, Enrico Peverada e Lorenzo Paliotto.
- Barotti, Lorenzo (1781). Serie de' vescovi ed arcivescovi di Ferrara (in Italian). Ferrara: Francesco Pomatelli. p. 46.
- Cappelletti, Giuseppe (1844). Le chiese d'Italia della loro origine sino ai nostri giorni, vol. II, Venezia 1844, pp. 579–624. Le chiese d'Italia della loro origine sino ai nostri giorni, vol. IV, Venezia 1846, pp. 9–226.
- Enciclopedia Cattolica, Vol. 5. (in Italian). Città del Vaticano 1950. Sub voce "Ferrara."
- Cittadella, Luigi Napoleone (1864). Notizie relative a Ferrara per la maggior parte inedite (in Italian). Ferrara: D. Taddei.
- Fèa, Carlo (1834). Il diritto sovrano della Santa Sede sopra le Valli di Comacchio e sopra la repubblica di S. Marino difeso (in Italian). Roma: Stamperia della Rev. Camera Apostolica.
- Ferranti, Giuseppe Manini (1808). Compendio della storia sacra e politica di Ferrara (in Italian). Vol. Tomo II. Ferrara: Socj Bianci e Negri.
- Ferranti, Giuseppe Manini (1808b). Compendio della Storia sacra e politica di Ferrara (in Italian). Vol. Tomo III. Ferrara: Bianchi e Negri.
- Fontanini, Giusto (1709). Il dominio temporale della sede apostolica sopra la citta di Comacchio (in Italian). Roma.
- Kehr, Paul Fridolin (1906). Italia Pontificia Vol. V: Aemilia, sive Provincia Ravennas. Berlin: Weidmann. (in Latin).
- Lanzoni, Francesco (1898). Il primo vescovo di Comacchio, in Atti e memorie della regia deputazione di storia patria per le Provincie di Romagna, Terza serie, vol. XXVII, 1909, pp. 62–70
- Lanzoni, Francesco (1927). Le diocesi d'Italia dalle origini al principio del secolo VII (an. 604), vol. II, Faenza 1927, p. 811-813; 819
- José-Apeles Santolaria de Puey y Cruells|Santolaria de Puey y Cruells, José-Apeles (2016). Annuario Diocesano 2017. Indicatore ecclesiastico per l'anno 2017. Stato del clero e delle parrocchie. (in Italian). Ferrara: Arcidiocesi di Ferrara-Comacchio 2016.
- Ughelli, Ferdinando; Coleti, Niccolò (1717). Italia sacra sive De Episcopis Italiae, et insularum adjacentium (in Latin). Venice: apud Sebastianum Coleti. pp. 513–565.
