= Sisto Visdomini =

Bishop of Modena from 1571 to 1590

- Bishop of Modena
- Church: Catholic Church
- See: Bishop of Modena
- Appointed: 16 November 1571
- Term ended: 27 September 1590
- Predecessor: Giovanni Gerolamo Morone
- Successor: Giulio Canani

Orders
- Consecration: 16 December 1571 (Bishop) by Alfonso Rossetti

Personal details
- Born: after 1523 Como
- Died: 27 September 1590 Modena
- Buried: San Domenico, Modena

Sisto Visdomini OP (or Vicedomini, Latin: Xystus Vicedominus, c. 1523–1590) was Bishop of Modena from 1571 to 1590. A member of the Dominican Order, he was appointed Inquisitor in Modena in 1569 before becoming bishop.

== Life ==
Sisto, son of Menapace, was born in Como to the important family Vicedomini originating from Cosio in Valtellina. Sisto was the fourth son, his elder brother, Pietrantonio, after a long political career became Vicegerent of Rome. Pierantonio was born in 1523, so Sisto was born after that year.

Sisto entered young in the Dominican Order, where he studied till to pass successfully a public disputation in Bologna in 1564. In 1569 he was appointed as Inquisitor in Modena. As suggested by Cardinal Giovanni Gerolamo Morone, who had just resigned from the bishopric of Modena, on 16 November 1571 Pope Pius V appointed Sisto bishop of Modena. He was consecrated bishop on 16 December 1571 by Alfonso Rossetti, bishop of Ferrara, the capital of the Duchy of Ferrara where Modena was located.

Sisto Visdomini was a typical prelate of the Counter-Reformation, less tolerant of dissent than his two predecessors. As suggested by the Council of Trento, Sisto held two synods, in 1572 and in 1575. In 1580 the Duke Alfonso II d'Este asked the Pope to remove Sisto, but between 1581 and 1583 he sent Sisto as own ambassador to Spain. Returned to Modena, Sisto reorganized some female convents, and in 1588 he introduced in the town the Order of Minims.

Sisto was an introverted and shy person, and he spent a lot of time in the village of Fiumalbo, in the mountains above Modena. Sisto Visdomini died in Modena on 27 September 1590 and he was buried in front of the main altar of the local church of San Domenico.
