= Ghilino Ghilini =

Most Reverend Ghilino Ghilini
- Bishop of Comacchio
- Church: Catholic Church
- Diocese: Diocese of Comacchio
- In office: 1514–1559
- Predecessor: Tommaso Foschi
- Successor: Alfonso Rossetti

Personal details
- Died: 21 December 1559

Ghilino Ghilini or Guglielmo de Guillini or Ghilino Ghillini (died 1559) was a Roman Catholic prelate who served as Bishop of Comacchio (1514–1559).

== Biography ==
On 1 September 1514, Ghilino Ghilini was appointed during the papacy of Pope Leo X as Bishop of Comacchio. He served as Bishop of Comacchio until his death on 21 December 1559.

While bishop, he was the principal co-consecrator of Lattanzio Roverella, Bishop of Ascoli Piceno (1551).

== External links and additional sources ==
- Cheney, David M. "Diocese of Comacchio (-Pomposa)". Catholic-Hierarchy.org. (for Chronology of Bishops) ^{[self-published]}
- Chow, Gabriel. "Diocese of Comacchio". GCatholic.org. (for Chronology of Bishops) ^{[self-published]}

Catholic Church titles
Preceded by Tommaso Foschi	Bishop of Comacchio; 1514–1559	Succeeded by Alfonso Rossetti
