= Lorenzo Magalotti (cardinal) =

Italian clergyman

His Eminence Lorenzo Magalotti
- Cardinal, Bishop of Ferrara
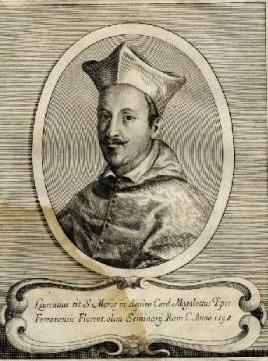
- Church: Catholic Church
- See: Ferrara
- Appointed: 5 May 1628
- Term ended: 19 September 1637
- Predecessor: Giambattista Leni
- Successor: Francesco Macchiavelli
- Other post: Cardinal Secretary of State

Orders
- Consecration: 7 May 1628 (Bishop) by Volpiano Volpi
- Created cardinal: 7 October 1624 by Pope Urban VIII

Personal details
- Born: January 1, 1584 Florence
- Died: September 19, 1637 (aged 53) Ferrara
- Buried: Cathedral of Ferrara

Lorenzo Magalotti (1 January 1584 – 19 September 1637) was an Italian clergyman who was Cardinal Secretary of State under Pope Urban VIII from 1623 to 1628, and later Bishop of Ferrara till his death.

== Early life ==
Lorenzo Magalotti was born on 1 January 1584 (1583 according to the Florentine calendar) in Florence to senator Vincenzo Magalotti, and Clarice Capponi. He studied law at the University of Perugia and completed his studies earning a doctorate in utroque iure in 1607 at the University of Pisa.

After the death of his father, in 1608, he moved to Rome and he took up a career in the administration of the Papal States: in 1609, he became referendary of the Tribunals of the Apostolic Signature, from 1611 for three years, he was appointed Vice-legate in Bologna.

From 1616 to 1618, he was governor of Montaldo (the southern part of Marche) and from 1618 to 1619, he acted as Vice-legato of Patrimonio (the province of Viterbo).

In 1620, he was appointed governor of Ascoli. Returned to Rome, he was appointed commissary general of the Papal State, governor of Cascia and finally in 1623 secretary of the Sacra Consulta, the organ of governance of the Papal States out of Rome. It is in these years that Magalotti had a correspondence in Galileo Galilei.

Such rapid career was favored by Cardinal Maffeo Barberini, whose brother, Carlo Barberini married in 1594 Lorenzo's sister, Costanza Magalotti.

== Secretary of State ==
A turning point in the life of Lorenzo Magalotti was the elevation of Maffeo Barberini to the papacy as Pope Urban VIII in August 1623. As in use in such age, the Pope trusted for the important political affairs only on his own relatives. The Pope appointed his nephew Francesco Barberini (son of Costanza Magalotti, and thus nephew also of Lorenzo) as cardinal nephew, and Lorenzo Magalotti himself, brother-in-law of the Pope’s brother, as head of the private papal secretaries, which was the function of the Papal Secretary of State in such a time.

Lorenzo Magalotti was created cardinal deacon on 7 October 1624 with the title of Santa Maria in Aquiro and on 16 December 1624, he passed to the order of cardinal priests maintaining the same title. On 28 February 1628 he gained the title of Cardinal of Santi Giovanni e Paolo.

Due to the young age and the lack of experience of the cardinal nephew, the Secretary of State became under Lorenzo Magalotti the main political office used by the Pope to manage the foreign and internal political affairs. The sphere of competence of the Secretary of State however overlapped with the more institutional competence of the cardinal nephew. As soon as the two nephews of the Pope, Francesco Barberini and the younger Antonio Barberini, became more experienced, Urban VIII decided to remove Lorenzo Magalotti from the Secretary in order to leave space to his nephews in the political affairs.

This decision was effective to the strategy of Pope Urban VIII to favour his own family, almost establishing a Barberini dynasty. A strategy not shared by Lorenzo Magalotti who, for example, opposed the elevation to cardinalate of Antonio Barberini in 1627.

== Bishop of Ferrara ==
Lorenzo Magalotti was appointed on 5 May 1628 Bishop of Ferrara, formally a promotion but actually his discharge from the Secretary of State. He was saddened by such decision, and he established to leave immediately Rome for Ferrara, just after being consecrated bishop on 7 May by Volpiano Volpi (Bishop of Novara and former Apostolic Datarius) and after the formal dismiss from the Pope. He was forbidden to return to Rome.

Magalotti entered in Ferrara on 4 June 1628. In Ferrara, he faced the plague and famine which devastated the town, and he tried to provide help to the population. As bishop he applied the reformed principles set by the Council of Trent, visited the diocese and held a synod in June 1637. The second part of his govern was marked by conflicts with the Cardinal Legate (the governor of the province), such as Giovan Battista Pallotta, where Lorenzo Magalotti defended the rights of the bishop.

He died in Ferrara on 19 September 1637, without having never returned to Rome. He was buried under the floor of the cathedral of such a town.
