= Pirro Gonzaga (cardinal) =

16th-century Catholic cardinal

His Eminence Pirro Gonzaga
- Cardinal-Priest of Sant'Agata de' Goti
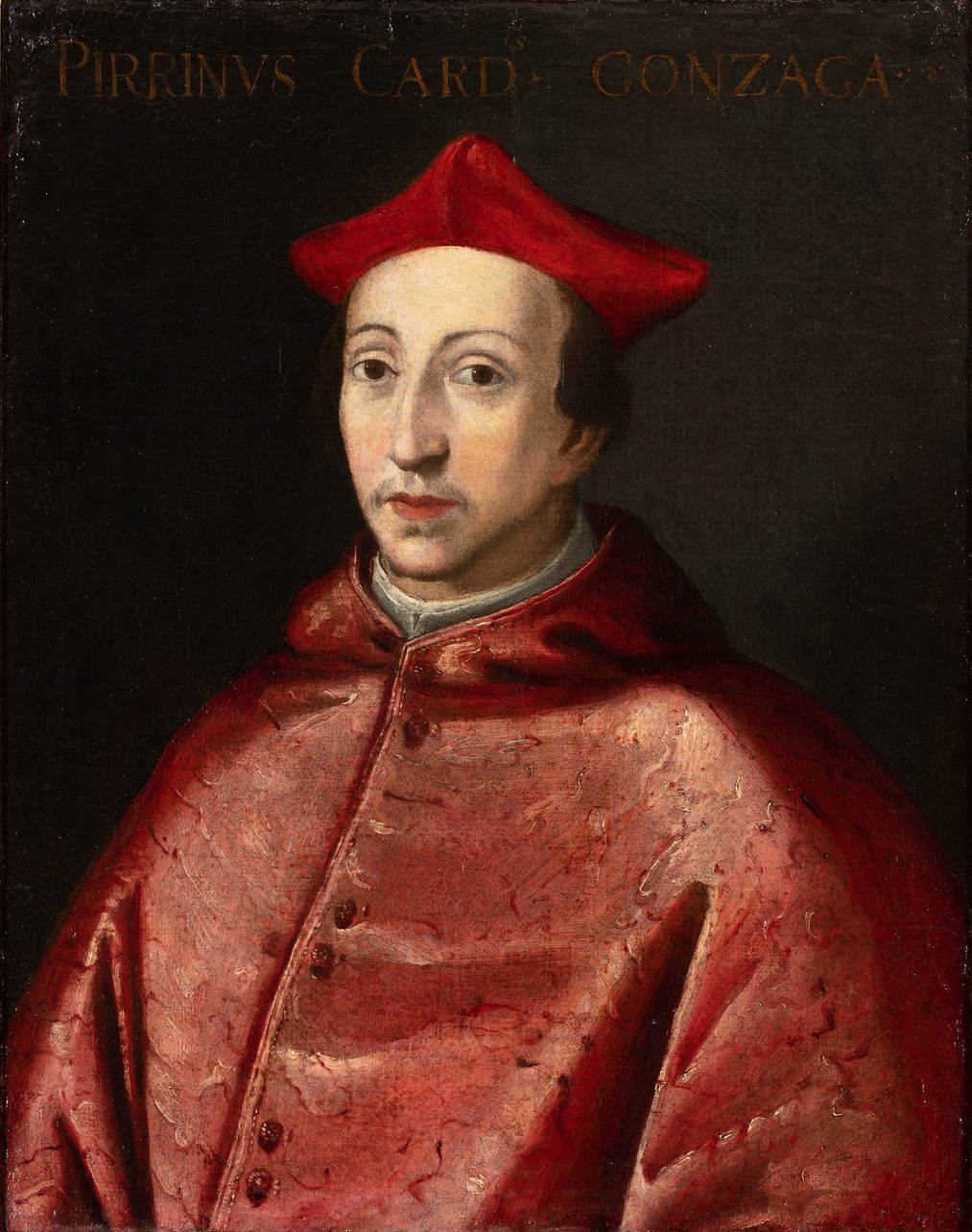
- Church: Catholic Church
- Diocese: Bishop-elect of Modena

Orders
- Created cardinal: 21 November 1527 by Pope Clement VII
- Rank: Cardinal Deacon

Personal details
- Born: 1505 Mantua, Italy
- Died: 28 Jan 1529 (age 24)

Pirro Gonzaga (1505–1529) was a Roman Catholic cardinal. He was the third son of Ludovico (the son of Ludovico 'Il Turco'), who was the second Count of Rodigo with Rivalta, and Lord of Sabbioneta, Correggioverde, Pomponesco, Gazzuolo, and Belforte; and of Francesca, the daughter of Gian Luigi Fieschi, Count of Lavagna. He was a cousin of Cardinal Ercole Gonzaga.

At the age of 22, on 5 September 1527, Pirro was given the Bishopric of Modena by Pope Clement VII, while the Pope was still being held prisoner in the Castel Sant'Angelo, and was being supported by the efforts of Pirro's elder brother, Luigi Gonzaga (Ludovico "Rodomonte"). Once Pope Clement was released, Luigi conducted him from the Castel Sant'Angelo to his refuge in Orvieto.

Pirro Gonzaga was created a cardinal by Pope Clement in the Consistory of 21 November 1527, which was held in the Castel Sant'Angelo; on 27 January 1528 he was assigned as his titular church the Deaconry of S. Agata in Suburra.

He was never consecrated a bishop, being below the canonical minimum age of 27 for episcopal consecration. According to Vicente Fontana, in his Teatro Dominicano, the diocese of Modena was administered by a suffragan bishop, Vincenzo Cevola, O.P., titular Bishop of Hierapolis.

Gonzaga died on 28 January 1529, at the family estate at Sabbioneta, north-northwest of Modena.

== Sources ==
- Cardella, Lorenzo (1793). Memorie storiche de cardinali della Santa romana chiesa ... (in Italian). Vol. Tomo quarto (4). Roma: Pagliarini. pp. 98–99.
- Gulik, Guilelmus (1923). Eubel, Conradus (ed.). Hierarchia catholica (in Latin). Vol. Tomus 3 (second ed.). Münster: Libreria Regensbergiana.
- Sillingardi, Gasparo (1606). Catalogus omnium episcoporum Mutinensium (in Latin). Modena: Joannes Maria de Verdis.

Catholic Church titles
Preceded by Ercole Rangone	Bishop of Modena; 1527–1529	Succeeded by Giovanni Gerolamo Morone
Preceded by Ercole Rangone	Cardinal-Priest of Sant'Agata de' Goti; 1528–1529	Succeeded by Francesco Pisani
