= Tommaso Foschi =

Most Reverend Tommaso Foschi
- Bishop of Comacchio
- Church: Catholic Church
- Archdiocese: Diocese of Comacchio
- In office: 1506–1514
- Predecessor: Maladusio d'Este
- Successor: Ghilino Ghilini

Personal details
- Born: Ferrara, Italy
- Died: 1514

Tommaso Foschi (died 1514) was a Roman Catholic prelate who served as Bishop of Comacchio (1506–1514).

== Biography ==
Tommaso Foschi was born in Ferrara, Italy. On 14 October 1506, Tommaso Foschi was appointed during the papacy of Pope Julius II as Bishop of Comacchio. He served as Bishop of Comacchio until his death in 1514.

== External links and additional sources ==
- Cheney, David M. "Diocese of Comacchio (-Pomposa)". Catholic-Hierarchy.org. (for Chronology of Bishops) ^{[self-published]}
- Chow, Gabriel. "Diocese of Comacchio". GCatholic.org. (for Chronology of Bishops) ^{[self-published]}

Catholic Church titles
Preceded by Maladusio d'Este	Bishop of Comacchio; 1506–1514	Succeeded by Ghilino Ghilini
