= Giovan Battista Pigna =

Italian humanist, poet and historian

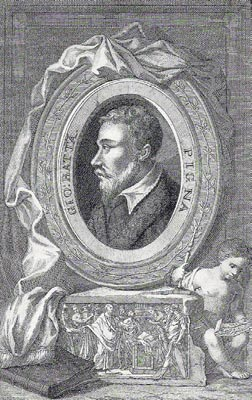
- Born: Giovan Battista Nicolucci; 8 April 1529; Ferrara, Duchy of Ferrara
- Died: 4 November 1575; Ferrara, Duchy of Ferrara
- Occupation: writer
- Movement: Renaissance humanism

Giovan Battista Pigna (April 8, 1529 – November 4, 1575) was an Italian humanist, poet and historian from Ferrara. A reformer of the University of Ferrara, Pigna was secretary to Alfonso II d'Este, Duke of Ferrara and court historian at Ferrara.

Pigna's I romanzi (1554) argued that chivalric romances like those of Ariosto were a modern form of poetry equal to those considered by Aristotle's Poetics. Torquato Tasso, who succeeded Pigna as court historian, attacked Pigna's defence of Ariostan poetry in his Discorsi dell'arte poetica.

== Works ==
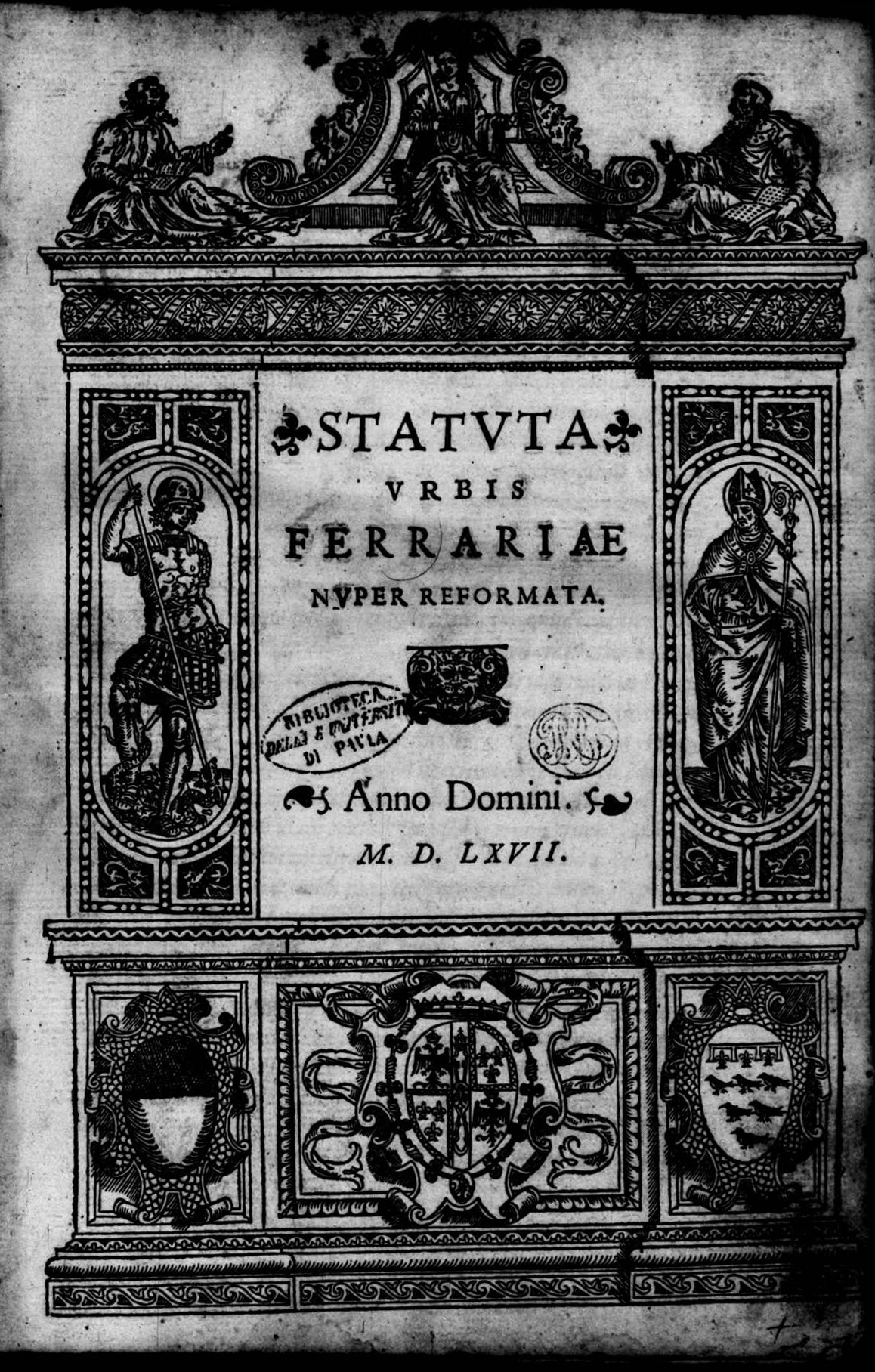
Statuta urbis Ferrariae nuper reformata, 1567

- I romanzi di M. Giouan Battita Pigna ... divisi in tre libri. Ne quali della poesia, & della vita dell'Ariosto con nuouo modo si tratta , 1554
- (ed.) Poetica Horatiana, 1561
- Statuta urbis Ferrariae nuper reformata (in Latin). Ferrara: Francesco Rossi. 1567.
- Statuta urbis Ferrariae nuper reformata (in Latin). Ferrara: Francesco Rossi. 1567.
- Historia de principi di Este, 1570

== Bibliography ==
- Girolamo Tiraboschi, Biblioteca modenese, IV, Modena 1783, p. 131;
- Lorenzo Barotti, Memorie istoriche di letterati ferraresi, II, Ferrara 1793, p. 177;
- Venceslao Santi, La precedenza fra gli Estensi e i Medici e l'istoria de' Principi d'Este di G. Battista Pigna, in Atti della Deputazione ferrarese di storia patria, IX (1897), p. 35 ff.;
- Luigi Raffaele, I codici delle rime di Giambattista Pigna, ibid., XXI (1912), p. 35 ff.;
- Giulio Bertoni, Torquato Tasso e Lucrezia Bendidio, in Poeti e poesie del Medioevo e del Rinascimento, Modena 1922, p. 273 ff.

== links ==
- Ritrovato, Salvatore (2013). "NICOLUCCI, Giovan Battista". Dizionario Biografico degli Italiani (in Italian). Vol. 78: Natta–Nurra. Rome: Istituto dell'Enciclopedia Italiana. ISBN 978-88-12-00032-6.
