= Francesco Maria Macchiavelli =

Italian cardinal

His Eminence Francesco Maria Macchiavelli
- Cardinal, Bishop of Ferrara
- Church: Catholic Church
- See: Ferrara
- Appointed: 11 October 1638
- Term ended: 22 November 1653
- Predecessor: Lorenzo Magalotti
- Successor: Carlo Pio di Savoia
- Other post: Patriarch of Constantinople

Orders
- Consecration: 1639 (Bishop)
- Created cardinal: 16 December 1641 by Pope Urban VIII

Personal details
- Born: 1608 Florence
- Died: November 22, 1653 (aged 44–45) Ferrara

Francesco Maria Macchiavelli (1608 – 22 November 1653) was an Italian Catholic cardinal. Born in Florence, he was bishop of Ferrara from 1638 to 1653.

== Biography ==
Francesco Maria Macchiavelli was born in Florence, as the second of seven children to Filippo Macchiavelli and Maria Magalotti (d.1635).

Macchiavelli was the nephew of cardinal Lorenzo Magalotti and the cousin of cardinals Francesco Barberini the elder and Antonio Barberini the younger whose parent were was Costanza Magalotti and Carlo Barberini . Macchiavelli´s sister Lucrezia married Bernardino Naro, who was gonfalonier to Urban VIII, and brother to the cardinal Gregorio Naro.

== Education ==
In 1623 he was sent to Rome, where he studied grammar and literature at the Roman Seminary (Pontificio Collegio Romano) and later he studied law.

== Career ==
Macchiavelli's ecclesial career began by his appointment as canon at St. Peter’s Basilica.

After the death of his uncle Lorenzo Magalott in 1637i, Macchiavelli became his successor as Bishop of Ferrara in 1638, followed by his appointment in 1640 Latin Patriarch of Constantinople.Macchiavelli was made a cardinal on the 16 December 1641 by Pope Urban VIII,

Macchiavelli was also an auditor of the Romana Rota and was a patron of the poet Francesco Buti.

He participated in the conclave of 1644, which elected Pope Innocent X.

== Death ==
Macchiavelli died at Ferrara on November 22,1653 and was subsequently buried in the cathedral of Ferrara.
