= Giovanni Fontana (bishop of Ferrara) =

Italian Catholic bishop (1537–1611)

Most Reverend Giovanni Fontana
- Bishop of Ferrara
- Church: Catholic Church
- Diocese: Diocese of Ferrara
- In office: 1590–1611
- Predecessor: Paolo Leoni
- Successor: Giambattista Leni

Orders
- Consecration: 11 September 1589 by Gaspare Visconti

Personal details
- Born: 1537 Vignola, Italy
- Died: 5 July 1611 (age 74) Ferrara, Italy

Giovanni Fontana (1537 – 5 July 1611) was a Roman Catholic prelate who served as Bishop of Ferrara (1590–1611) and Titular Bishop of Nicopolis in Palaestina (1589–1590).

== Biography ==
Giovanni Fontana was born in Vignola, Italy in 1537. On 11 September 1589, he was appointed during the papacy of Pope Sixtus V as Coadjutor Bishop of Ferrara and Titular Bishop of Nicopolis in Palaestina On 11 September 1589, he was consecrated bishop by Gaspare Visconti, Archbishop of Milan, with Gerolamo Ragazzoni, Bishop of Bergamo, and Ludovico Taverna, Bishop of Lodi, serving as co-consecrators. On 7 August 1590, he succeeded as Bishop of Ferrara. He served as Bishop of Ferrara until his death on 5 July 1611.

While bishop, he was the principal consecrator of Alfonso Paleotti, Coadjutor Archbishop of Bologna (1591); and the principal co-consecrator of Orazio Giraldi, Bishop of Comacchio (1592), and Camillo Beccio, Bishop of Acqui (1599)

== External links and additional sources ==
- Cheney, David M. "Nicopolis in Palaestina (Titular See)". Catholic-Hierarchy.org. (for Chronology of Bishops) ^{[self-published]}
- Chow, Gabriel. "Titular Episcopal See of Nicopolis in Armenia (Turkey)". GCatholic.org. (for Chronology of Bishops) ^{[self-published]}
- Cheney, David M. "Archdiocese of Ferrara-Comacchio". Catholic-Hierarchy.org. (for Chronology of Bishops) ^{[self-published]}
- Chow, Gabriel. "Archdiocese of Ferrara–Comacchio (Italy)". GCatholic.org. (for Chronology of Bishops) ^{[self-published]}

Catholic Church titles
Preceded by Jean Doroz	Titular Bishop of Nicopolis in Palaestina; 1589–1590	Succeeded by François de Sales
Preceded by Paolo Leoni	Bishop of Ferrara; 1590–1611	Succeeded by Giambattista Leni
