= Giovanni Morone =

Italian cardinal (1509–1580)

His Eminence Giovanni Morone
- Cardinal-Bishop of Ostia
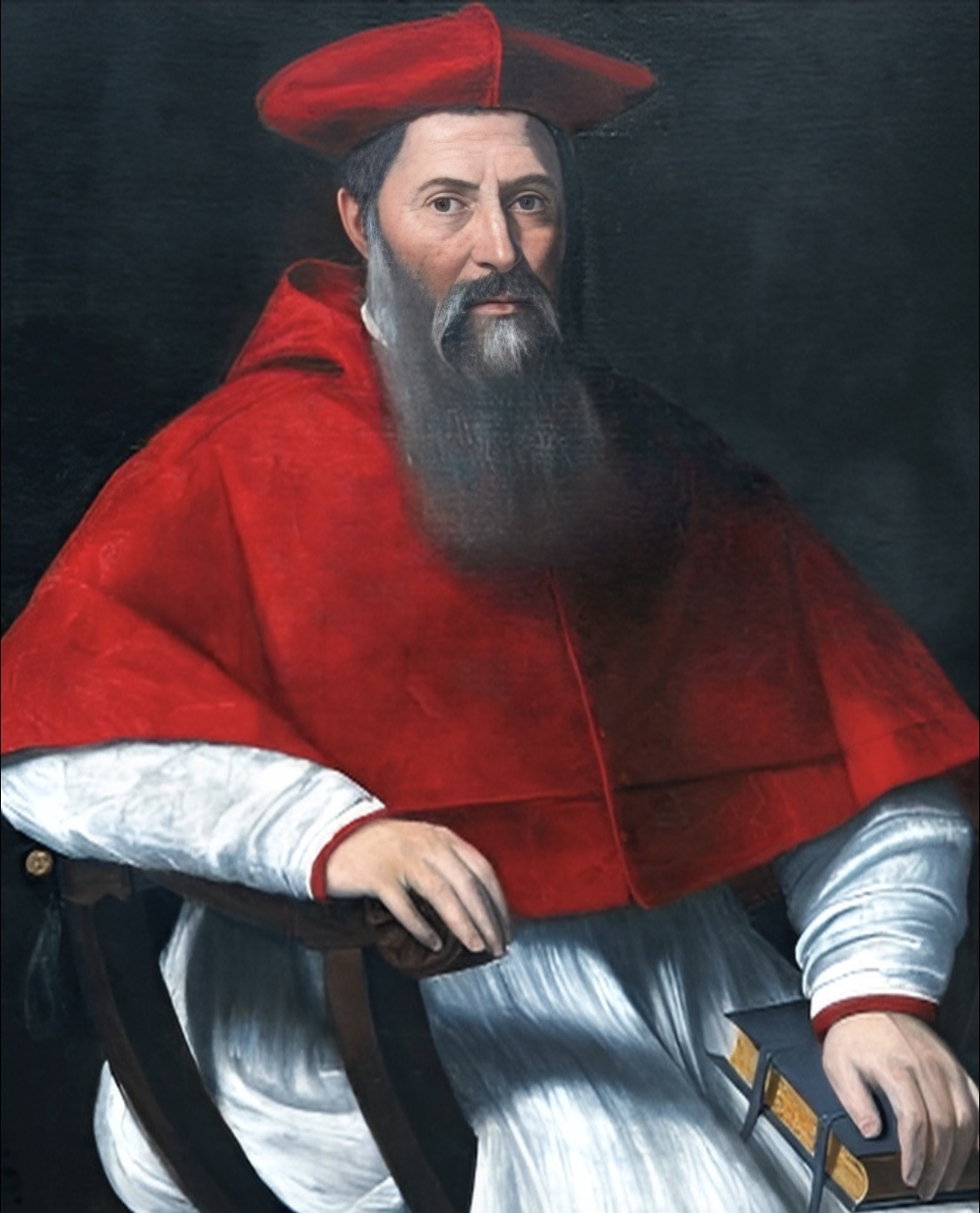
- Portrait of Cardinal Morone, 16th century
- Church: Roman Catholic Church
- Diocese: Diocese of Ostia
- See: Ostia
- Appointed: June 1570
- Term ended: 1 December 1580
- Predecessor: Francesco Pisani
- Successor: Alessandro Farnese
- Other post: Dean of the College of Cardinals (1570–1580)
- Previous posts: Bishop of Modena (1529–1550, 1564–1571); Bishop of Novara (1552–1560); Cardinal-Bishop of Albano (1560–1561); Cardinal-Bishop of Sabina (1561–1562); Cardinal-Bishop of Frascati (1562, 1564–1565); Cardinal-Bishop of Palestrina (1562–1564); Cardinal-Bishop of Porto–Santa Rufina (1565–1570)

Orders
- Ordination: 12 January 1533
- Consecration: 12 January 1533
- Created cardinal: 2 June 1542 by Pope Paul III
- Rank: Cardinal-Bishop

Personal details
- Born: Giovanni Girolamo Morone; 25 January 1509 Milan, Duchy of Milan
- Died: 1 December 1580 (aged 71) Rome, Papal States
- Buried: Santa Maria sopra Minerva
- Coat of arms: Giovanni Morone's coat of arms

Giovanni Morone (or Moroni) (25 January 1509 – 1 December 1580) was an Italian cardinal. He was named Bishop of Modena in 1529 and was created Cardinal in 1542 by Pope Paul III. As a cardinal, he resided in the Vatican's Apostolic Palace and was consulted by Saint Ignatius, founder of the Jesuits.

== Biography ==
=== Early life and ordination ===
Morone was born in Milan, on 25 January 1509, where his father, Count Girolamo Morone (d. 1529), was grand chancellor. His father, who had been imprisoned for opposing encroachments on the liberties of Milan by Charles V (whom he afterwards cordially supported), removed to Modena, where his youngest son had most of his early education. Proceeding to Padua, he studied jurisprudence with distinction. In return for important service rendered by his father, he was, on 7 April 1529, at the age of 20, nominated by Pope Clement VII to the see of Modena as a demonstration of gratitude. His father Girolamo had been one of the commissioners who negotiated the terms of the release of the Pope from imprisonment in the Castel Sant'Angelo in 1527 during the Sack of Rome. Giovanni was seven years too young to be consecrated a bishop, and in any event, his appointment was disputed by the future Cardinal Ippolito II d'Este, son of the Duke of Ferrara, who claimed that the Pope had promised the See of Modena and a Cardinalate for him in a treaty of 14 November 1528. D'Este was finally bought off with an annual pension. Giovanni Morone was finally ordained priest and consecrated bishop on 12 January 1533.

=== Diplomatic missions ===
From 1535, he was repeatedly entrusted by Pope Paul III with diplomatic missions; first, he went with a mission to France to King Francis I to attempt to arrange a peace with the Emperor; then he was sent as nuncio in 1536 to the Emperor's brother, King Ferdinand I, then in 1539–1540 to Hagenau and Worms in an attempt to reclaim those areas for the Catholic Church. Morone was legate to the Diet of Speyer (1542) having successfully resisted the transfer of the diet to Hagenau on account of the plague (1540). On 31 May 1542, he was created Cardinal Priest, and on 16 October 1542 assigned the titulus of San Vitale. He was further nominated protector of England, Hungary, Austria, of the Order of St. Benedict, the Cistercian Order and the Order of Preachers (Dominicans), and of the Santa Casa at Loreto. With the cardinals Pier Paolo Parisio and Reginald Pole, he was deputed to open the Council of Trent (1 November 1542 – 6 July 1543), the choice of that place of meeting having been a concession to his diplomacy. The legates arrived on 22 November, but no council assembled; proceedings were suspended and postponed until 1545. He was appointed instead to be Papal Legate to Bologna, from 2 April 1544 to 13 July 1548. His vice-Legate was Giannangelo de' Medici, who became Pope Pius IV. On 25 February 1549, he opted for the Cardinalatial titulus of San Stefano in Monte Celio (San Stefano Rotondo). The death of Paul III on 10 November 1549 deprived him of a good friend.

He participated in the Conclave of 1549, where his friend and fellow President of the Council of Trent, Reginald Pole, came close to being elected pope.

=== Relations with Protestants ===
The views of the Reformers had spread in his diocese, and he was suspected of temporizing with them. He resigned (1550) in favour of the Dominican Egidio Foscarari, reserving to himself an annual pension and the patronage of livings. Later, he founded the diocesan seminary. On 11 December 1553, he opted for the titulus of San Lorenzo in Lucina, which meant a greater income. Pope Julius III, at the instance of the Duke of Milan, gave him the rich see of Novara (which he resigned in 1560 for the Suburbicarian See of Albano) and sent him as nuncio to the diet of Augsburg (1555), from which he was immediately recalled by the death of Julius III (23 March 1555).

He participated in the Conclave of 5–10 April 1555, which saw the election of Cardinal Marcello Cervini as Pope Marcellus II. However Marcellus died after only twenty-two days in office. A second Conclave in May, on the nomination of Cardinal Alessandro Farnese and Cardinal Ippolito d' Este, elected (23 May) the Dean of the College of Cardinals, Cardinal Gianpietro Carafa, the Grand Inquisitor of the Roman Inquisition. This was much to the distaste of the Emperor, who was aware of Carafa's deep hatred of the Spanish and his religious fanaticism.

=== Incarceration on orders of the Pope ===
Stemma of Cardinal Morone

Morone opted for the titulus of Santa Maria in Trastevere on 12 June 1556. But on 31 May 1557, on direct orders of Pope Paul IV, carried out by his nephew, Cardinal Carlo Carafa, Morone was imprisoned in the Castel Sant'Angelo (with others, including Bishop Egidio Foscherari), on suspicion of the Lutheran heresy. The College of Cardinals, led by their Dean, Cardinal du Bellay, demanded a Consistory the next day, and the Pope was forced to explain himself. He stated that there had been questions about the orthodoxy of Cardinal Morone since the time of Paul III, and he also attacked Cardinal Pole. He insisted that Morone remain in the hands of the Inquisition for a future time when all the Cardinals would be summoned to judge his case. A commission of Cardinals was appointed to conduct the interrogations, among whom was Cardinal Michele Ghislieri (the future Pope Pius V), Cardinal Scipione Rebiba, Cardinal Giovanni Reuman Suau, and Cardinal Alessandro Farnese. The prosecution entirely failed, the Cardinals having found no grounds for any of the charges. Morone might have had his liberty and the Suburbicarian Bishopric of Albano, but refused to leave prison unless Paul IV publicly acknowledged his innocence. Paul IV, a former Inquisitor who believed that the Inquisition was never wrong, refused to admit his error, and therefore Morone remained incarcerated until the pope's death (18 August 1559). It is believed that Paul IV published his Cum ex apostolatus officio to prevent Cardinal Morone from being elected the next Pope because he suspected Morone of secretly being in league with Protestants. As events turned out, Cardinal Giovanni Angelo de' Medici was elected and took the name Pope Pius IV. Morone did have the great pleasure of making the acquaintance of Cardinal Carlo Borromeo at that Conclave, and Borromeo conceived a very high opinion of Morone's virtues.

Upon the election of Pius IV, Morone's name was cleared publicly, and he accepted the office of Cardinal Bishop of Albano, which he exchanged for that of Sabina in 1561, then Palestrina in 1562, and Porto and Santa Rufina in 1565. In 1564, he had the pleasure of receiving back from Pius IV the diocese of Modena, upon the decease of the incumbent, and he held the post until 1571. In 1566, he was a candidate at the Conclave summoned to elect a successor to Pius IV. He had the support of the Emperor and the Spanish, and was supported by Cardinal Carlo Borromeo; but the French faction and some of the Italian princes (Ferrara and Florence) were able to exclude him from the Papal Throne. Cardinal Ghislieri declared that he had reconsidered Morone's case and could not in conscience elect him, though he did not impose that judgment upon the other cardinals. Nonetheless, Morone received as many as twenty-nine votes in the scrutinies, a majority, but not the two-thirds majority (35) needed to elect. Ghislieri himself was ultimately elected unanimously and took the name of Pope Pius V.

He became Dean of the Sacred College of Cardinals in 1570, and assumed the Bishopric of Ostia and Velletri which went with the Deanship. In that capacity he presided over the Conclave of 1572, which elected Ugo Boncompagni as Pope Gregory XIII. As Cardinal Bishop of Ostia and Velletri, he was attentive to the implementation of the decrees of the Council of Trent, especially as regards the holding of regular diocesan synods. On 3 June 1573, a Synod took place under his authority in the Diocese of Veletri, with his Suffragan bishop, Lorenzo Bernardini, presiding. In October 1579, the Cardinal Bishop himself presided. The original Acta are preserved, with his handwriting and seal on them.

=== Years as a senior statesman ===
Morone continued to explore issues within the Church and between Catholics and Protestants in hopes of reuniting the two sides. He commissioned Nicholas Sander to research the progress of Protestantism in England, resulting in the publication of the Report on the State of England in 1560. In 1562, Morone assisted Pius IV in restarting the Council of Trent, earning a reputation as a skilled mediator and, in hindsight, "the savior of the council." He served as its last chair under Pius IV and helped the Council to create the Tridentine Creed.

When the festival of the Jubilee of 1575 began in Rome, Cardinal Morone presided over the ceremony of the opening of the Holy Door, through which hordes of pilgrims passed, at the Basilica of San Paolo Fuori le Mura on the Via Ostiensis. In 1575, likewise, he was invited to join a legation which included Matteo Senarega, a minister of the Emperor and a minister of the King of Spain, to visit Genoa, which had fallen into complete disorder because of civil strife. Morone was able to bring peace to the troubled city with a new civic constitution, the major part of which was written by Morone. Next year he was asked to attend the Diet at Ratisbon, in the presence of the Emperor Maximilian II, and his very presence had the effect of calming the participants. In 1578, he was sent to Flanders to restore peace there, but (as might have been expected) he was unable to achieve his goal.

He died on 1 December 1580, and was buried in the Basilica of Santa Maria sopra Minerva, the headquarters of the Dominicans, whose Protector he was.

== Books ==
- Dittrich, Franz (1892). Nuntiaturberichte Giovanni Morones vom deutschen Königshofe. 1539. 1540 (in German). Paderborn: F. Schöningh.
- Robinson, Adam Patrick (2016). The Career of Cardinal Giovanni Morone (1509–1580): Between Council and Inquisition. New York: Routledge. ISBN 978-1-317-03937-2.

Catholic Church titles
| Preceded by Pirro Gonzaga (cardinal) | Bishop of Modena; 1529–1550 | Succeeded by Egidio Foscherani |
| Preceded by Giulio della Rovere | Bishop of Novara; 1552–1560 | Succeeded by Giovanni Antonio Serbelloni |
| Preceded by Egidio Foscherani | Bishop of Modena; 1564–1571 | Succeeded by Sisto Visdomini |
| Preceded by Pedro Pacheco de Villena | Cardinal-bishop of Albano; 1560–1561 | Succeeded by Cristoforo Madruzzo |
| Preceded by Robert de Lenoncourt | Cardinal-bishop of Sabina; 1561–1562 | Succeeded by Alessandro Farnese |
| Preceded by Federico Cesi | Cardinal-bishop of Frascati; 1562–1562 and 1564–1565 | Succeeded by Alessandro Farnese |
| Preceded by Federico Cesi | Cardinal-bishop of Palestrina; 1562–1564 | Succeeded by Cristoforo Madruzzo |
| Preceded by Federico Cesi | Cardinal-bishop of Porto e Santa Rufina; 1565–1570 | Succeeded by Cristoforo Madruzzo |
| Preceded by Francesco Pisani | Cardinal-bishop of Ostia; 1570–1580 | Succeeded by Alessandro Farnese |
