= Ercole Rangoni =

1xth-century Catholic bishop

His Eminence Ercole Rangoni
- Cardinal-Deacon of Sant'Agata de' Goti; Bishop of Modena
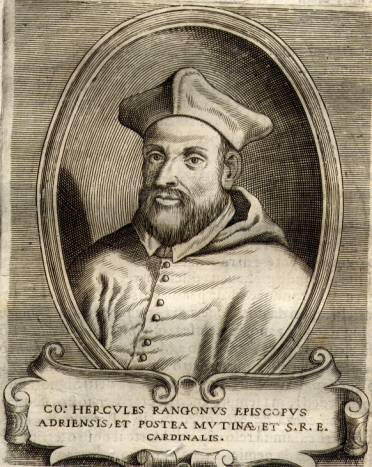
- Native name: Rangoni Ercole
- Church: Catholic Church

Orders
- Created cardinal: July 1, 1517

Personal details
- Born: 1491 Bologna, Italy
- Died: 15 August 1527 (aged 35–36) Rome, Italy
- Denomination: Roman Catholic

Ercole Rangoni or Ercole Rangone (died 25 August 1527) was a cardinal and religious leader of the Catholic Church for 10 years.

== Biography ==
He served as Bishop of Adria from 1519 to 1524 and Bishop of Modena from 1509 until his death. He was made a cardinal in July 1517 by Pope Leo X. This was during his fifth consistory. Not much information is known about Ercole, but he served as a cardinal for the Catholic Church, in Vatican City. When his mother became a widow in 1500, she took the family back to Modena. When he finished his studies, he went to Rome and entered the service of Cardinal Giovanni de' Medici, future Pope Leo X. When the cardinal, who was papal legate, was taken prisoner by the French in 1512. In Ravenna, Ercole who was in Rome, was sent by his mother to assist the cardinal with gifts and help; he wanted to remain with the cardinal and share with him his prison but the latter did not allow it and asked Ercole to return to the Medicis; when the cardinal was being transported to France, helped by Andrea Guidone, a Modenese, he escaped and went to Piacenza and then to Modena, where Donna Bianca received him in Palazzo Rangone and gave him vestments, money, horses and a considerable sum of silver; the cardinal was later elected to the pontificate and then invited her to Rome and treated her as if he was her own son. The new pope named Ercole his privy chamberlain and gave Andrea Guidone the title of chamberlain. Soon afterward, Ercole was named “protonotary apostolic”.

Catholic Church titles
Preceded by Gabriele de' Gabrielli	Cardinal-Deacon of Sant'Agata de' Goti; 1517–1527	Succeeded by Pirro Gonzaga (cardinal)
Preceded by Beltrame Costabili	Bishop of Adria; 1519–1524	Succeeded by Giambattista Bragadin
Preceded by Ippolito d'Este	Bishop of Modena; 1520–1527	Succeeded by Pirro Gonzaga (cardinal)
