= Archdiocese of Modena–Nonantola =

Roman Catholic archdiocese in Italy

Archdiocese of Modena–Nonantola Archidioecesis Mutinensis–Nonantulana

Catholic
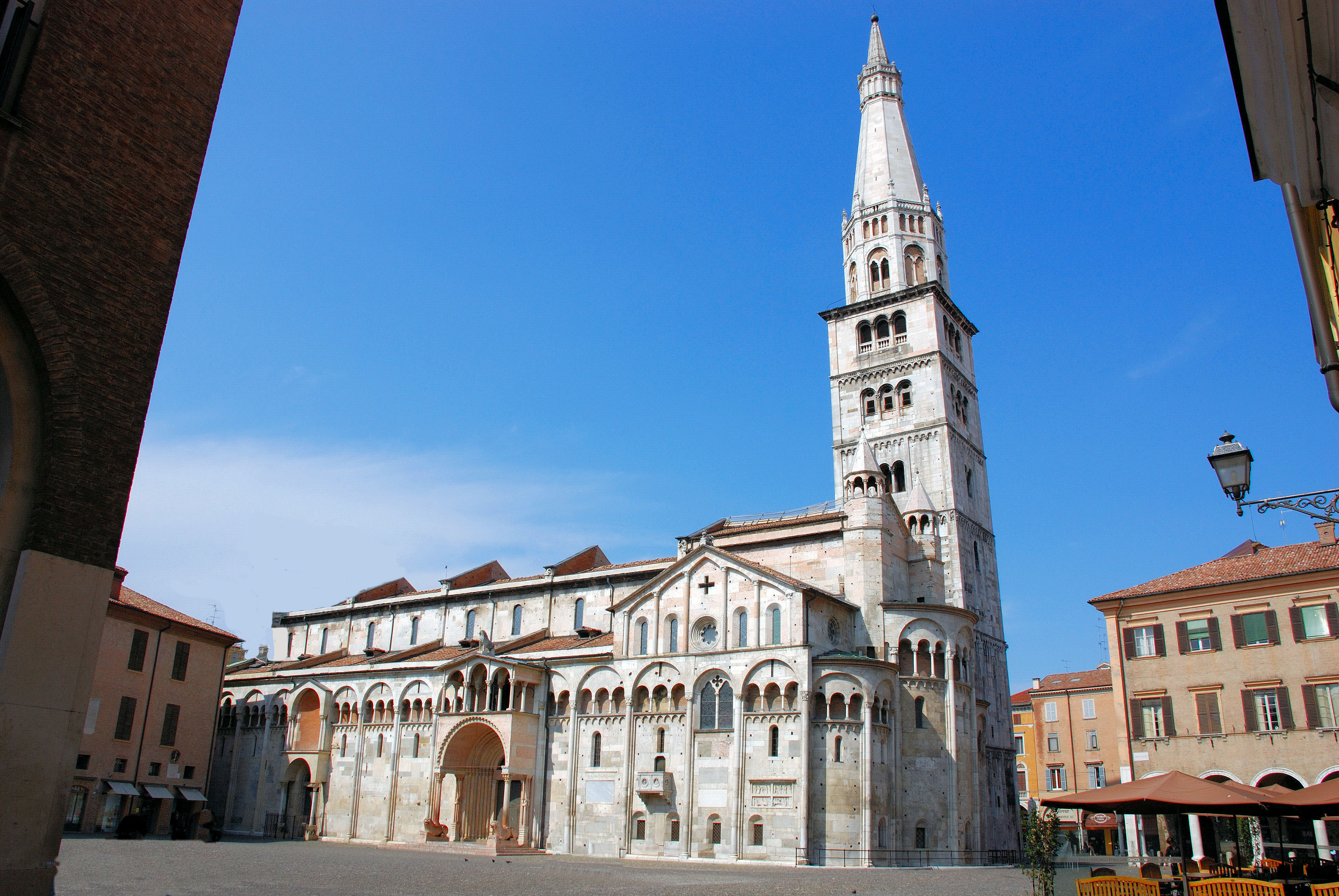
- Modena Cathedral

Location
- Country: Italy
- Ecclesiastical province: Modena–Nonantola
- Headquarters: n/a

Statistics
- Area: 2,089 km^{2} (807 sq mi)
- Population: Total; Catholics: (as of 2023); 509,000 (est.) ▼; 398,000 (est.) ▼
- Parishes: 222 ▼

Information
- Denomination: Catholic Church
- Rite: Roman Rite
- Established: 4th century
- Cathedral: Basilica Cattedrale di S. Maria Assunta
- Co-cathedral: Basilica Abbaziale di San Silvestro I Papa
- Secular priests: 165 (diocesan) ▼37 (Religious Orders) ▼95 Permanent Deacons ▲

Current leadership
- Pope: Leo XIV
- Archbishop: Erio Castellucci

Map
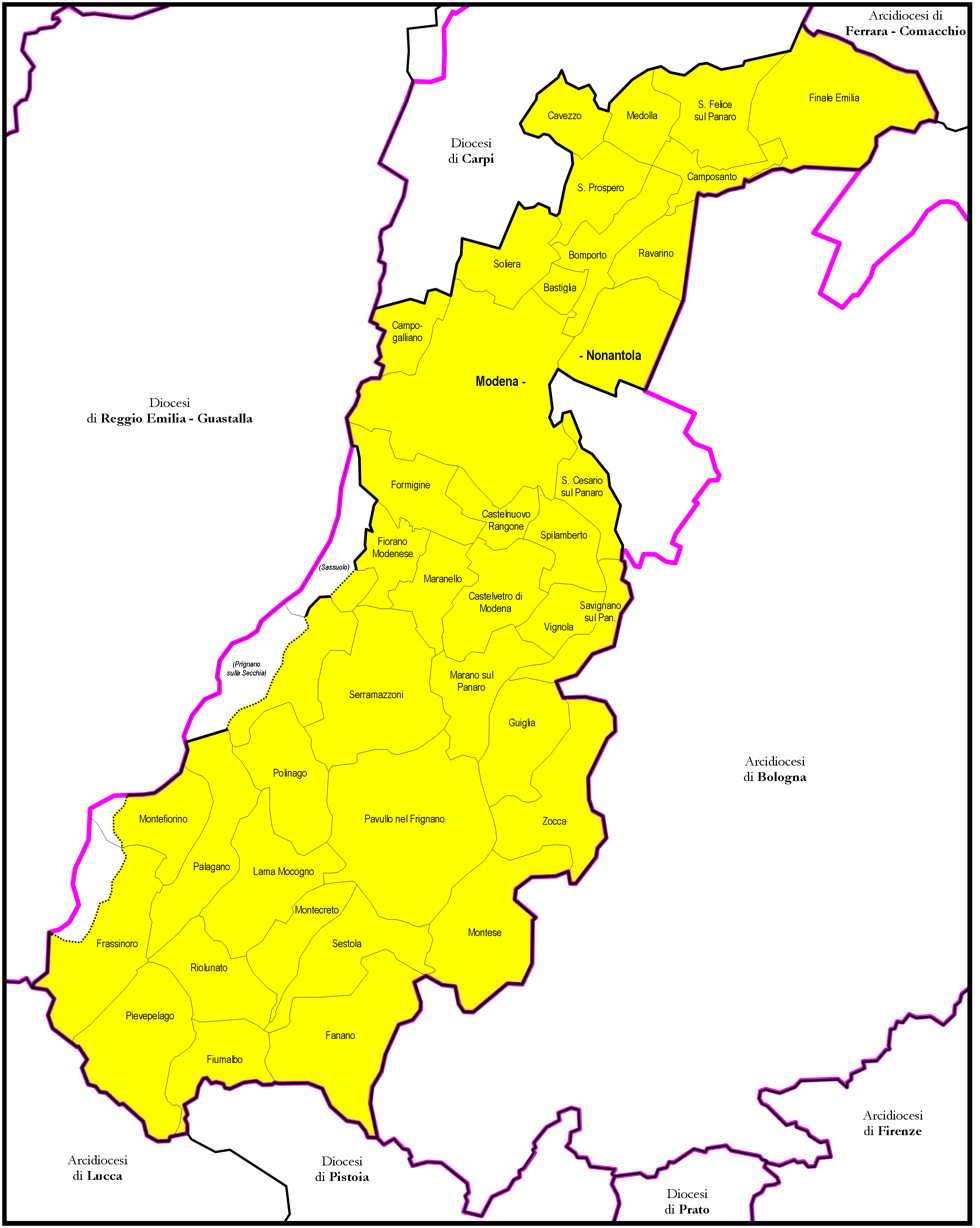

Website
- https://www.chiesamodenanonantola.it/

The Archdiocese of Modena–Nonantola (Latin: Archidioecesis Mutinensis–Nonantulana) is a Latin archdiocese of the Catholic Church in Italy. It existed as the Diocese of Modena in central Italy from the 4th century. Originally it was a suffragan (subject to) the diocese of Milan, but later became a suffragan of Ravenna. Because of the schism of the Antipope Clement III, Pope Paschal II released Modena from obedience to the church of Ravenna, but Pope Gelasius II restored the previous status. Modena continued as a suffragan of Ravenna until 1582, when the Archdiocese of Bologna was created by Pope Sixtus V in the Bull Universi orbis of 1 December 1582, and was assigned Modena as one of its suffragans.

In 1820 the diocese of Modena incorporated the territory of Nonantola Abbey. Modena was raised to the status of an archdiocese and its bishop to the status of a Metropolitan Archbishop by Pope Pius IX in his bull of 22 August 1855, entitled Vel ab antiquis. The archdiocese took the current form of its name in 1986. Its suffragans are the Diocese of Carpi, Diocese of Fidenza, Diocese of Parma, Diocese of Piacenza-Bobbio, and Diocese of Reggio Emilia–Guastalla.

== History ==
On 7 July 1148, in a synod held at Cremona, Pope Eugene III condemned the city of Modena and divided its territory among four neighboring bishoprics, so that the bishop of Modena was left being a bishop nullius dioecesis. It is known, from a decree of 8 April 1149, that he assigned ten parishes of Modena to the diocese of Reggio. Concerning the restitution of the diocese, perhaps by Pope Eugenius, perhaps by Pope Adrian IV, there is no information. Cardinal Hildebrandus Crassus was named Rector et Procurator Ecclesiae Mutinensis, and he subscribed documents with that title from 1150 up until 1155. Disruptions, however, continued for generations. In 1231 Pope Gregory IX had to order the monastery of S. Peter in Modena to submit to the rule of the bishop of Modena, rejecting their argument that Pope Eugene's release from subjection to the bishop had had a permanent effect, and that the monastery was still in 1231 immediately subject to the Holy See (Papacy).

During the episcopacy of Bishop Giovanni Morone (1529–1550; 1564–1571), both the Jesuit Order and the Capuchin Order were introduced into the diocese of Modena. In 1535 he served as papal Nuncio to the King of France, and, from 1536 to 1542, with brief interruptions, Morone was papal Nuntius to the King of Bohemia, Ferdinand, King of the Romans. At the end of 1540, he wrote to Cardinal Farnese, expressing his anxiety about the diocese of Modena, which he considered to be worse than Prague in terms of dubious religious discussions. For his diplomatic work, he received the red hat of the cardinalate on 2 June 1542. On 16 October he was named Camerlengo of the Holy Roman Church. He was then appointed one of the presidents of the Council of Trent, which his work in Germany did much to make possible.

In 1796, Modena and Nonantola became part of the empire of the French Republic, expanding under the military leadership of General Napoleon Bonaparte. The monastery and the diocese of Nonantola were suppressed.

On 11 December 1821, Pope Pius VII confirmed in the bull Sacrorum canonum the rearrangements of the dioceses in the Duchy of Modena which had been worked out by the Sacred Consistorial Congregation. These adjustments had been made necessary by the intrusive enactments made by the occupying French governments of the Cisalpine Republic and the Napoleonic Kingdom of Italy. Modena, which had been made a suffragan of Milan, was returned to the ecclesiastical province of Bologna, and its acquisition of the territorial Abbey of Nantola was confirmed.

=== Cathedral and Chapter ===
The fabric of the cathedral was erected during the 11th century. The high altar, dedicated to S. Geminianus, was consecrated by Pope Paschal II, in the presence of Countess Matilda of Tuscany, on 8 October 1106. The remains of S. Geminianus had already been transferred to the new basilica in a ceremony presided over by the Pope and the Countess on 30 April 1106.

In 1184, Pope Lucius III visited Modena, accompanied by ten cardinals, the Archbishops of Ravenna and Lyons, and the Bishops of Reggio and Bologna. On 12 July 1184, he presided over the consecration of the newly refurbished Cathedral.

Canons were already in existence at Modena by 892. A document of the Emperor Guido (891–894), dated November 892, speaks of granting Bishop Leudoinus powers for building ramparts ad muniendam ipsam sanctam Ecclesiam suamque constitutam Canonicam.

Bishop Varinus (c. 1003 – after 1120) had been Primicerius of the Cathedral Chapter before being elected bishop. Bishop Martinus (1207–1221) had been Provost of the Cathedral Chapter when he was elected bishop. Bishop Alberto Boschetti (1234–1264) had been Magister scholae (cantorum) when elected bishop. Bonincontro da Floriano (1313 ? – 1318) had been Archpriest of the Cathedral when elected.

On 9 May 1177, Pope Alexander III ratified the agreement reached by the Chapter, that they would not have more than fourteen Canons. On 30 May 1177, Pope Alexander ratified another decision of the Chapter, not to allow Canons who lived outside the Canonicate to hold prebends. In 1679, the Cathedral Chapter was composed of nine dignities and twelve Canons. In 1745 there were twelve dignities and twelve Canons. From 1855, the Chapter has been composed of one dignity, the Archpriest, and twelve Canons.

=== Synods ===
A diocesan synod was an irregular but important meeting of the bishop of a diocese and his clergy. Its purpose was (1) to proclaim generally the various decrees already issued by the bishop; (2) to discuss and ratify measures on which the bishop chose to consult with his clergy; (3) to publish statutes and decrees of the diocesan synod, of the provincial synod, and of the Holy See.

Bishop Guido de Baisio (1318–1334) held a diocesan synod on 5–6 May 1320.

Bishop Nicolò Sandonnini (1465–1479) held a diocesan synod in Modena in 1479.

During the episcopate of Cardinal Ercole Rangoni (1520–1527), a synod was held by his Vicar General, Giandomenico Sigibaldi in 1521. A diocesan synod was held in Modena on 4–5 September 1565 during the Administratorship of Cardinal Giovanni Morone (1564–1571), in accordance with the decrees of the Council of Trent. Morone was particularly eager to have the laity attend the synod, so that they could be better informed about the decrees of the Council. The Constitutions of the synod of Modena were also published. Bishop Sisto Visdomini (1571–1590) presided over a diocesan synod on 23 September 1572, and again on 25 October 1575. A synod was held by Bishop Gaspare Sillingardi (1593–1607) on 15 June 1594.

Bishop Pellegrino Bertacchi (1610–1627) presided over a diocesan synod held in Modena on 23 May 1612. He also held synods on 21 May 1615, in 1617 and in 1624. His immediate successor, Bishop Alessandro Rangoni (1628–1640) held diocesan synods on 5–6 November 1631, and his second on 12–14 October 1637. Bishop Roberto Fontana (1646–1654) held his first diocesan synod on 25 May 1647. On 4–6 June 1659, Bishop Ettore Molza (1655–1679) held his first diocesan synod. His second synod was held on 14–16 November 1675. Bishop Carlo Molza (1679–1690) presided over a synod in 1687.

There were synods in 1726 and 1739 under Bishop Stefano Fogliani (1717–1742).

A synod of the independent territorial abbey of Nonantola was held at Nonantola on 8 September 1688, under the authority of Cardinal Giacomo de Angelis.

== Bishops ==
=== Diocese of Modena ===
Metropolitan: Archbishop of Ravenna (to 1583)

==== to 1000 ====
[Cletus (circa 270)]

- Dionisius (325)
- Antoninus (?)
- Geminianus (341 – January 349 died)
- Theodorus (349)

[Geminianus (390)]

- Theodulus (circa 398)

[Geminianus (420)]

- Gregorius (attested 482)
- Bassianus (Bassus, Cassianus) (501)
- Pietro (679)
- Martino (circa 693)
- Giovanni (744)
- Lupicino (749)
- Geminiano (by 752 – 791)
- Gisio (c. 796–811)
- Diodato (Deusdedit) (818–840? died)
- Jonas (attested 841, 850)
- Hernidus (attested 861)
- Walpertus (attested 864, 865, 869)
- Leudoinus (871–893)
- Giovanni (898)
- Gamenolfo (898–902)
- Gotifredus (attested 902–923)
- Ardingo (after 933? – 943)
- Guido (944–?)
- Hildebrandus (969–993)
- Giovanni (993–c. 1001)

==== from 1000 to 1400 ====
- Varinus (c. 1003 – after 1120)
- Ingo (1023–1038)
- Wibertus (Guiberto, Viberto, Uberto) (1039–1054)
- Eriberto (Umberto, Erberto, Ariberto) (1054–1085) deposed
- Benedetto (1085–1097 died)
- Egidio (1097)
- Dodone (1100–1136 died)
- Ribaldo (1136–1148)

Cardinal Hildebrandus Crassus (c 1150 – c. 1155)

Rector et Procurator Ecclesiae Mutinensis

- Enrico (1157–c. 1173)
- Ugo (1174–c. 1179)
- Ardicio (1179–1194)
- Egidio Garzoni (1195–1207}
- Martinus (1207–1221)
- Guglielmo di Savoia, O. Cart. (1222–1233)
- Alberto Boschetti (1234–1264)
- Matteo de' Pii (1264–1276)

Sede vacante (1276–1281)

- Ardizio Conti (1281–1287)
- Filippo Boschetti, O.F.M. (1287–1290 died)
- Jacopo (1290 – May 26, 1311 died)
- Bonadamus Boschetti (1311–1313)
- Bonincontro da Floriano (1313 ? – 1318)
- Guido de Guiscis (Baisio) (1318–1334)
  - Rolando (Orlando) (1329–1330 deposed) (schismatic)
- Bonifazio (1337–1340)

Sede vacante (1340–1342)

- Alemanno Donati, O.F.M. (1342–1352)
- Aldobrandino d'Este (1352–1377)

Sede vacante (1377–1380)

- Guido de Baisio (1380–1382)
- Dionisio Restani, O.S.A. (1383–1400 died)
- Pietro Bojardi (1400–1401)

==== from 1400 to 1823 ====
- Nicolò Bojardi (Boiardo) (1401–1414)
- Carlo Bojardi (Boiardo) (1414–1436)
- Scipione Manenti (1436–1444)
- Giacomo Antonio della Torre (1444–1463)
- Delfino della Pergola (1463–1465)
- Nicolò Sandonnini (1465–1479)
- Gian Andrea Bocciazzi (1479–1495)
- Giovanni Battista Ferrari (1495–1502)
- Francesco Ferrari (1502–1507)
- Cardinal Ippolito d'Este (1507–1520) Administrator
- Cardinal Ercole Rangoni (1520–1527) Bishop-elect
- Cardinal Pirro Gonzaga (1527–1528) Bishop-elect
- Giovanni Gerolamo Morone (1529–1550) resigned
- Egidio Foscarari, O.P. (1550–1564)
- Giovanni Gerolamo Morone (1564–1571) (resigned)
- Sisto Visdomini, O.P. (1571–1590)
- Cardinal Giulio Canani (1591–1592)
- Gaspare Silingardi (1593–1607)
- Lazaro Pellizzari, O.P. (1607–1610)
- Pellegrino Bertacchi (1610–1627)
- Alessandro Rangoni (1628–1640)
- Opizo d'Este (1640–1644)
- Roberto Fontana (1645–1654)
- Ettore Molza (1655–1679)
- Carlo Molza, O.S.B. (1679–1690)
- Ludovico Masdoni (1691–1716)
- Stefano Fogliani (1717–1742)
- Ettore Molza (1743–1745)
- Giuliano Sabbatini, Sch.P. (1745–1757)
- Giuseppe Maria Fogliani (1757–1783)
- Tiburzio Cortese (1786–1823)

=== Diocese of Modena e Nonantola ===
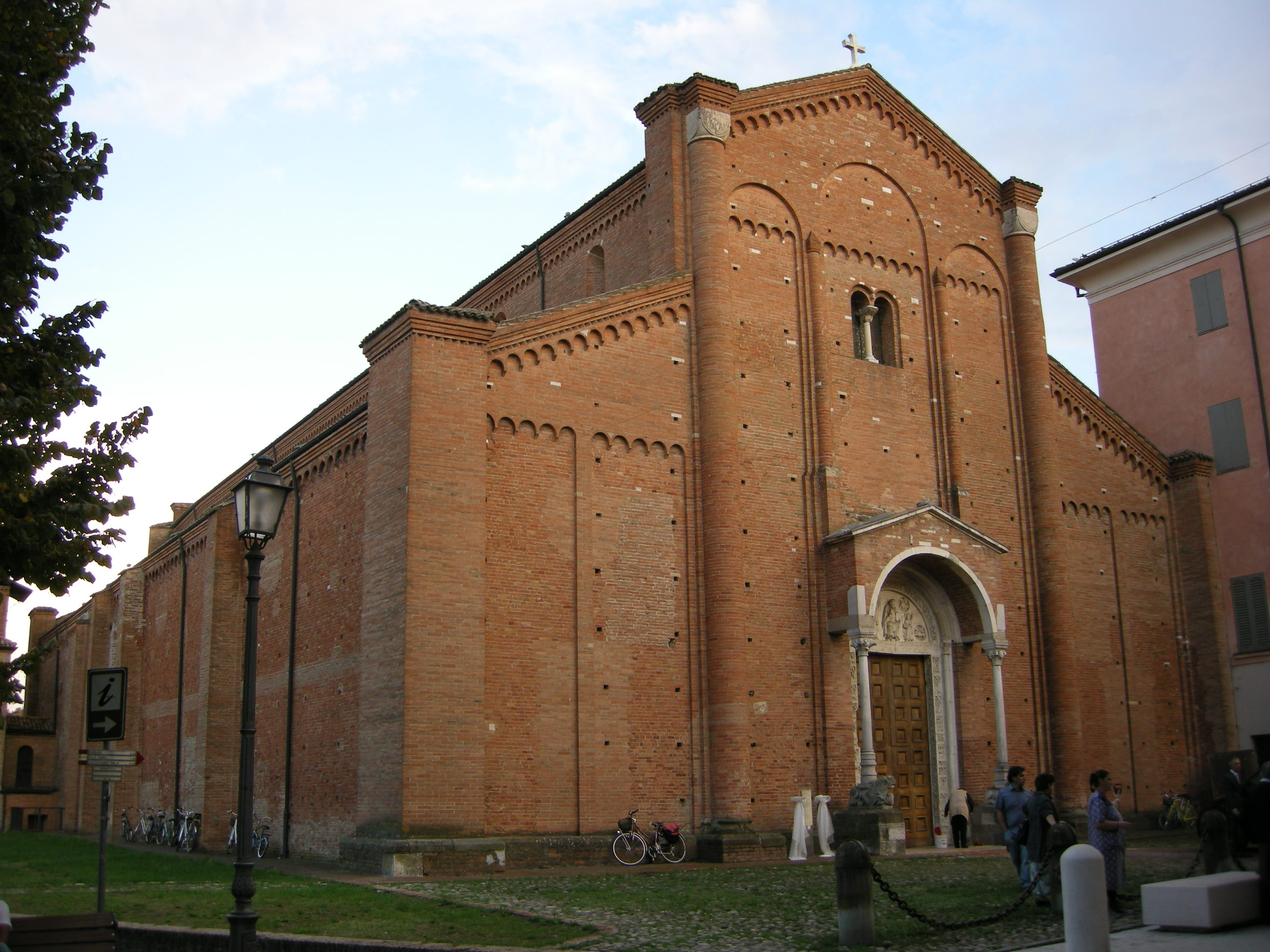
Nonantola Abbey, the co-cathedral

United: 15 December 1820 with the Territorial Abbey of Nonantola
Latin Name: Mutinensis et Nonantulana

- Giuseppe Emilio Sommariva (1824–1829)
- Adeodato Antonio Giovanni Luigi Caleffi, O.S.B. (1830–1837)
- Luigi Reggianini (1838–1847)
- Luigi Ferrari (1848–1851)
- Francesco Emilio Cugini (1852–1872)

=== Archdiocese of Modena e Nonantola ===
Elevated: 22 August 1855

- Giuseppe Maria delli Guidelli Guidi (6 May 1872 – 1889 died)
- Carlo Maria Borgognini (1889 – 1900 died)
- Natale Bruni (17 December 1900 – 14 April 1926 died)
- Giuseppe Antonio Ferdinando Bussolari, O.F.M.Cap. (7 May 1926 – 1939 died)
- Cesare Boccoleri (28 March 1940 – 31 October 1956 died)
- Giuseppe Amici (23 December 1956 – 1976 retired)
- Bruno Foresti (1976–1983)
- Santo Bartolomeo Quadri (3 September 1983 – 12 April 1996 retired)

=== Archdiocese of Modena-Nonantola ===
Name Changed: 30 September 1986

- Benito Cocchi (9 June 1996 – 27 January 2010 retired)
- Antonio Lanfranchi (14 March 2010 – 17 February 2015 died)
- Erio Castellucci (3 June 2015 – )

== See also ==
- Modena

== Books ==
=== Reference works for bishops ===
- Gams, Pius Bonifatius (1873). Series episcoporum Ecclesiae catholicae: quotquot innotuerunt a beato Petro apostolo (in Latin). Ratisbon: Typis et Sumptibus Georgii Josephi Manz.
- Eubel, Conradus, ed. (1913). Hierarchia catholica (in Latin). Vol. Tomus 1 (second ed.). Münster: Libreria Regensbergiana. (in Latin)
- Eubel, Conradus, ed. (1914). Hierarchia catholica (in Latin). Vol. Tomus 2 (second ed.). Münster: Libreria Regensbergiana.
- Eubel, Conradus, ed. (1923). Hierarchia catholica (in Latin). Vol. Tomus 3 (second ed.). Münster: Libreria Regensbergiana.
- Gauchat, Patritius (Patrice) (1935). Hierarchia catholica. Vol. Tomus IV (1592-1667). Münster: Libraria Regensbergiana.
- Ritzler, Remigius; Sefrin, Pirminus (1952). Hierarchia catholica medii et recentis aevi. Vol. Tomus V (1667-1730). Patavii: Messagero di S. Antonio.
- Ritzler, Remigius; Sefrin, Pirminus (1958). Hierarchia catholica medii et recentis aevi. Vol. Tomus VI (1730-1799). Patavii: Messagero di S. Antonio.
- Ritzler, Remigius; Sefrin, Pirminus (1968). Hierarchia Catholica medii et recentioris aevi (in Latin). Vol. VII (1800–1846). Monasterii: Libreria Regensburgiana.
- Remigius Ritzler; Pirminus Sefrin (1978). Hierarchia catholica Medii et recentioris aevi (in Latin). Vol. VIII (1846–1903). Il Messaggero di S. Antonio.
- Pięta, Zenon (2002). Hierarchia catholica medii et recentioris aevi (in Latin). Vol. IX (1903–1922). Padua: Messagero di San Antonio. ISBN 978-88-250-1000-8.

=== Studies ===
- Borghi, Carlo (1845). Il duomo, ossia Cenni storici e descrittivi della Cattedrale di Modena (in Italian). Modena: Antonio ed Angelo Cappelli.
- Cappelletti, Giuseppe (1859). Le chiese d'Italia: dalla loro origine sino ai nostri giorni (in Italian). Vol. Tomo decimoquinto (15). Venezia: G. Antonelli. pp. 191–331.
- Dondi, Antonio (1896). Notizie storiche ed artistiche del Duomo di Modena: Coll' elenco dei codici capitolari in appendice (in Italian). Modena: Tipografia pontificia ed arcivescovile dell'Immacolata Concezione.
- Kehr, Paul Fridolin (1906). Italia Pontificia Vol. V: Aemilia, sive Provincia Ravennas. Berlin: Weidmann, pp. 298–363. (in Latin).
- Lanzoni, Francesco (1927). Le diocesi d'Italia dalle origini al principio del secolo VII (an. 604). Faenza: F. Lega, pp. 790–793. (in Italian)
- Sillingardi, Gasparo (1606). Catalogus omnium episcoporum Mutinensium (in Latin). Modena: Joannes Maria de Verdis.
- Tiraboschi, Girolamo (1781). Biblioteca modenese, o Notizie della vita e delle opere degli scrittori natii degli stati del ... duca di Modena (in Italian). Vol. Tomo I. Modena: Societa tipografica. Tiraboschi, Girolamo (1782). Tomo II. Tiraboschi, Girolamo (1783). Tomo III. Tiraboschi, Girolamo (1783). Tomo IV. Tiraboschi, Girolamo (1784). Tomo V. Tiraboschi, Girolamo (1786). Tomo VI.
- Tiraboschi, Girolamo (1784). Storia dell'augusta Badia di S. Silvestro di Nonantola, aggiuntovi il Codice diplomatico della medesima (in Italian). Vol. Tomo I. Modena: Presso la Società tipografica. Tiraboschi, Girolamo (1785). Tomo II.
- Tiraboschi, Girolamo (1793). Memorie storiche modenesi (in Italian). Vol. Tomo I. Modena: Soc. Typografica. Tiraboschi, Girolamo (1793). Tomo II. Tiraboschi, Girolamo (1794). Tomo III. Tiraboschi, Girolamo (1794). Tomo IV. Tiraboschi, Girolamo (1795). Tomo V.
- Ughelli, Ferdinando; Coleti, Niccolò (1717). Italia sacra sive De Episcopis Italiae, et insularum adjacentium (in Latin). Vol. Tomus II. Venice: apud Sebastianum Coleti. pp. 73–140.
- Vedriani, Lodovico (1669). Catalogo de Vescovi Modonesi ... con molte Figure di quelli (in Italian). Modena: Bartolomeo Soliani.
