= Alfonso Rossetti =

Most Reverend Alfonso Rossetti
- Bishop of Ferrara
- Church: Catholic Church
- Diocese: Diocese of Ferrara
- In office: 1563–1577
- Predecessor: Luigi d'Este
- Successor: Paolo Leoni
- Previous post: Bishop of Comacchio (1559–1563)

Personal details
- Died: 25 February 1577

Alfonso Rossetti (died 1577) was a Roman Catholic prelate who served as Bishop of Ferrara (1563–1577) and Bishop of Comacchio (1559–1563).

== Biography ==
On 22 October 1548, Alfonso Rossetti was appointed during the papacy of Pope Paul III as Coadjutor Bishop of Comacchio. He succeeded to the bishopric on 21 December 1559. On 8 October 1563, he was appointed during the papacy of Pope Pius IV as Bishop of Ferrara. He served as Bishop of Ferrara until his death on 25 February 1577.

== External links and additional sources ==
- Cheney, David M. "Diocese of Comacchio (-Pomposa)". Catholic-Hierarchy.org. (for Chronology of Bishops) ^{[self-published]}
- Chow, Gabriel. "Diocese of Comacchio". GCatholic.org. (for Chronology of Bishops) ^{[self-published]}
- Cheney, David M. "Diocese of Comacchio (-Pomposa)". Catholic-Hierarchy.org. (for Chronology of Bishops) ^{[self-published]}
- Chow, Gabriel. "Diocese of Comacchio". GCatholic.org. (for Chronology of Bishops) ^{[self-published]}

Catholic Church titles
Preceded by Ghilino Ghilini	Bishop of Comacchio; 1559–1563	Succeeded by Ercole Sacrati
Preceded by Luigi d'Este	Bishop of Ferrara; 1563–1577	Succeeded by Paolo Leoni
