= Lorenzo Barotti =

Italian Jesuit priest, historian, and poet

- Born: 20 December 1724; Ferrara, Papal States
- Died: 18 December 1801; Ferrara, Papal States
- Occupation: Writer

Lorenzo Barotti (20 December 1724 – 18 December 1801) was an Italian Jesuit priest, historian, and poet.

== Biography ==
Lorenzo Barotti was born in Ferrara. He studied under the Jesuits in Vicenza, Padua, and Venice, and joined the order in 1740, though the suppression of the Society of Jesus in 1773 left him bereft of an ecclesiastical appointment. Early in his career he taught rhetoric at Bologna, affiliated with the church of Santa Lucia. He published a biography of illustrious writers from Ferrara, a work begun by his father, published in 1777. He wrote a history of the bishops and archbishops of Ferrara (1787). He was also known for his poetry.

== Works ==
- Per le felici faustissime nozze de' nobilissimi signori il sig. conte Niccolò Caprara colla signora donna Ippolita Virginia Salviati, Bologna, nella stamperìa di Lelio dalla Volpe, 1753.
- La fisica poemetto. A sua eccellenza la signora contessa Vittoria Caprara, Ferrara, per Giuseppe Barbieri, 1754.
- Il caffè. Canti due, Parma, dalla Stamperia reale, 1781.
- Serie de' vescovi ed arcivescovi di Ferrara del Signor Abbate [sic] Lorenzo Barotti dedicata all'Eminentissimo e Reverendissimo Signore il Signor Card. Bernardino Giraud prouditore del regnante Sommo Pontefice, Ferrara, per Francesco Pomatelli, 1781.
- Lezioni sacre dell'abate Lorenzo Barotti, 2 voll., Parma, dalla Stamperia reale, 1785-1786.
- Memorie istoriche di letterati ferraresi opera postuma di Giannandrea Barotti. Volume primo [-secondo], Edizione accresciuta di un secondo volume, opera di Lorenzo Barotti, Ferrara, per gli eredi di Giuseppe Rinaldi, 1792-1793. Ristampa anastatica: Bologna, Forni, 1970.

== Bibliography ==
- Zicàri, Italo (1964). "BAROTTI, Lorenzo". Dizionario Biografico degli Italiani (in Italian). Vol. 6: Baratteri–Bartolozzi. Rome: Istituto dell'Enciclopedia Italiana. OCLC 883370.
