= Giulio Canani =

Italian Roman Catholic cardinal

His Eminence Giulio Canani
- Bishop of Modena, Cardinal priest of S. Anastasia
- See: Diocese of Modena
- Installed: February 8, 1591—November 27, 1592
- Other post: Previously Bishop of Adria

Orders
- Created cardinal: December 12, 1583

Personal details
- Born: 1524 Ferrara, Italy
- Died: November 27, 1592 Ferrara, Italy

Giulio Canani (1524 – 27 November 1592) was an Italian Cardinal of the Roman Catholic Church. Canani became a bishop in 1554 and a cardinal priest in 1583. He also participated in 4 papal conclaves in the 1590s.

== Early life ==
Canani was orn in Ferrara to Luigi Canani and Lucrezia Brancaleone.

He studied both canon and civil law in the University of Ferrara and he became cleric in Ferara.

== Career ==
Later he went to Rome and, in 1552, he was appointed papal datary by Pope Julius III. Canani was elected bishop of Adria on November 26, 1554.

Canani was nominated for the cardinalate by Duke Alfonso d'Este of Ferrara. He was created cardinal priest in the consistory of December 12, 1583, by Pope Gregory XIII, and was assigned the titular church of Sant'Eusebio on November 28, 1584.

On February 8, 1591, he was transferred to the see Diocese of Modena . Later he opted for the title of S. Anastasia on March 20, 1591.

He participated in the two conclaves of 1590 that elected Urban VII and Gregory XIV. He also participated in the papal conclave of 1591 that elected Innocent IX and in the papal conclave of 1592 that elected Clement VIII.

== Death ==
Giulio Canani died on November 27, 1592, in his native town Ferrara during a short visit there.

== External links and additional sources ==
- Cheney, David M. "Archdiocese of Modena-Nonantola". Catholic-Hierarchy.org. (for Chronology of Bishops) ^{[self-published]}
- Chow, Gabriel. "Metropolitan Archdiocese of Modena–Nonantola (Italy)". GCatholic.org. (for Chronology of Bishops) ^{[self-published]}
- Miranda, Salvador. "CANANI, Giulio (1524-1592)". The Cardinals of the Holy Roman Church. Florida International University. OCLC 53276621.
