= Decio Azzolini (seniore) =

16th-century Catholic cardinal

His Eminence Decio Azzolini
- Cardinal-Priest of San Matteo in Merulana; Archpriest of the Basilica di Santa Maria Maggiore; Bishop of Cervia
- Church: Catholic Church

Personal details
- Born: 1 Jul 1549 Fermo, Italy
- Died: 7 Oct 1587 (age 38) Rome, Italy

Decio Azzolini, seniore (1 July 1549 – 7 October 1587) was a Roman Catholic cardinal.

== Episcopal succession ==
While bishop, he was the principal consecrator of:

- Marco Antonio Mocenigo, Bishop of Ceneda (1586);
- Francesco Cantucci, Bishop of Loreto (1586);
- Clemente Bontodasio, Bishop of Nicastro (1586);
- Antonio Migliori (Meliori), Bishop of San Marco (1586);
- Domenico Ginnasi, Archbishop of Manfredonia (1586);
- Orazio Marzani, Bishop of San Severino (1586);
- Rutilio Benzoni, Bishop of Loreto (1586); and
- Francesco Spera, Titular Archbishop of Nazareth (1587).

Catholic Church titles
Preceded by Lorenzo Campeggi	Bishop of Cervia; 1585–1587	Succeeded by Annibal Pauli
Preceded by Filippo Boncompagni	Archpriest of the Basilica di Santa Maria Maggiore; 1586–1587	Succeeded by Domenico Pinelli
Preceded by Jérôme Souchier	Cardinal-Priest of San Matteo in Merulana; 1586–1587	Succeeded by Giovanni Evangelista Pallotta
