= Marcello Crescenzi (bishop of Assisi) =

Italian Roman Catholic prelate (died 1630)

Most Reverend Marcello Crescenzi
- Bishop of Assisi
- Church: Catholic Church
- Diocese: Diocese of Assisi
- In office: 1591–1630
- Predecessor: Giovanni Battista Brugnatelli
- Successor: Tegrimus Tegrimi

Orders
- Consecration: 4 December 1591 by Michele Bonelli

Personal details
- Died: 13 August 1630 Assisi, Italy

Marcello Crescenzi (died 13 August 1630) was a Roman Catholic prelate who served as Bishop of Assisi (1591–1630).

== Biography ==
On 13 November 1591, Marcello Crescenzi was appointed during the papacy of Pope Innocent IX as Bishop of Assisi. On 4 December 1591, he was consecrated bishop by Michele Bonelli, Cardinal-Bishop of Albano, with Paolo Alberi, Archbishop Emeritus of Dubrovnik, and Rutilio Benzoni, Bishop of Loreto, with serving as co-consecrators. He served as Bishop of Assisi until his death on 13 August 1630.

== Episcopal succession ==
While bishop, he was the principal consecrator of:

- Domenico de' Marini (patriarch), Bishop of Albenga (1611);
- Francesco Boncompagni, Bishop of Fano (1623);

and the principal co-consecrator of:

- Dionisio Martini, Bishop of Nepi e Sutri (1616).

== External links and additional sources ==
- Cheney, David M. "Diocese of Assisi-Nocera Umbra-Gualdo Tadino". Catholic-Hierarchy.org. (for Chronology of Bishops)^{self-published}
- Chow, Gabriel. "Diocese of Assisi-Nocera Umbra-Gualdo Tadino (Italy)". GCatholic.org. (for Chronology of Bishops)^{self-published}

Catholic Church titles
Preceded by Giovanni Battista Brugnatelli	Bishop of Assisi; 1591–1630	Succeeded by Tegrimus Tegrimi
