= Jean de Bertrand (cardinal) =

French cardinal (1482–1560)

His Eminence Jean de Bertrand
- Cardinal-Priest of San Crisogono; Administrator of Sens
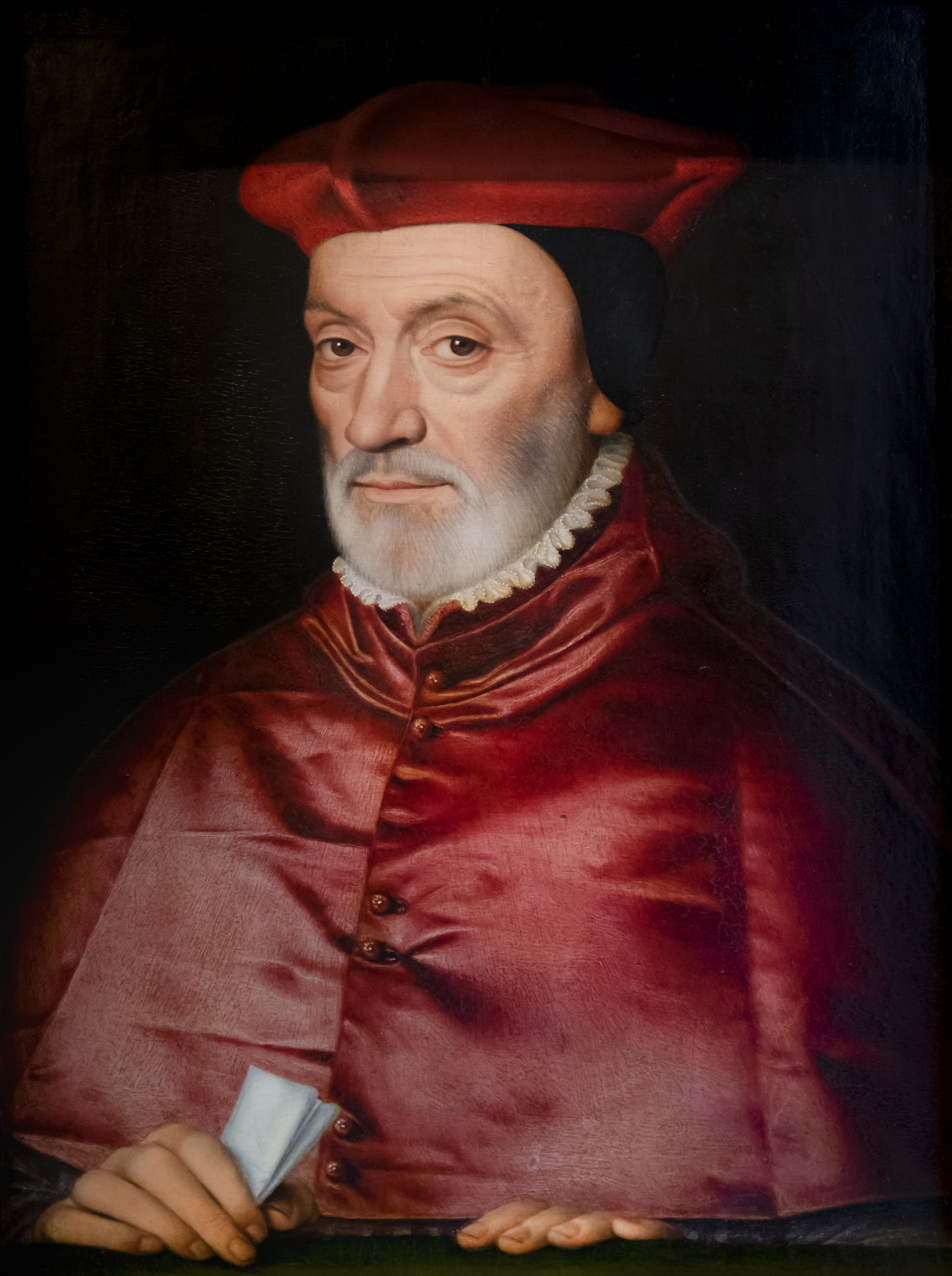
- Portrait by Jean Clouet
- Church: Catholic Church

Orders
- Consecration: 30 Apr 1560 by Filippo Roccabella
- Created cardinal: 15 March 1557 by Pope Paul IV

Personal details
- Born: 1482 Toulouse, France
- Died: 4 Dec 1560 (age 78) Venice, Venetian Republic
- Buried: Santo Stefano, Venice

Jean de Bertrand (1482 – 4 December 1560) was a Roman Catholic cardinal.

== Biography ==
On 30 Apr 1560, he was consecrated bishop by Filippo Roccabella, Bishop of Recanati.

Catholic Church titles
Preceded by Jean de Mauléon	Bishop of Comminges; 1555–1556	Succeeded by Carlo Carafa
Preceded by Louis de Bourbon de Vendôme	Administrator of Sens; 1557–1560	Succeeded by Louis de Guise de Lorraine
Preceded by Juan Martínez Silíceo	Cardinal-Priest of Santi Nereo ed Achilleo; 1557–1560	Succeeded by Luigi d'Este
Preceded by Giovanni Angelo de' Medici	Cardinal-Priest of Santa Prisca; 1560	Succeeded by Jean Suau
Preceded by Cristoforo Madruzzo	Cardinal-Priest of San Crisogono; 1560	Succeeded by Charles de Bourbon-Vendôme
