= Basso della Rovere Chapel =

Chapel in the church of Santa Maria del Popolo, Rome

Coordinates: 41°54′41.02″N 12°28′35.29″E

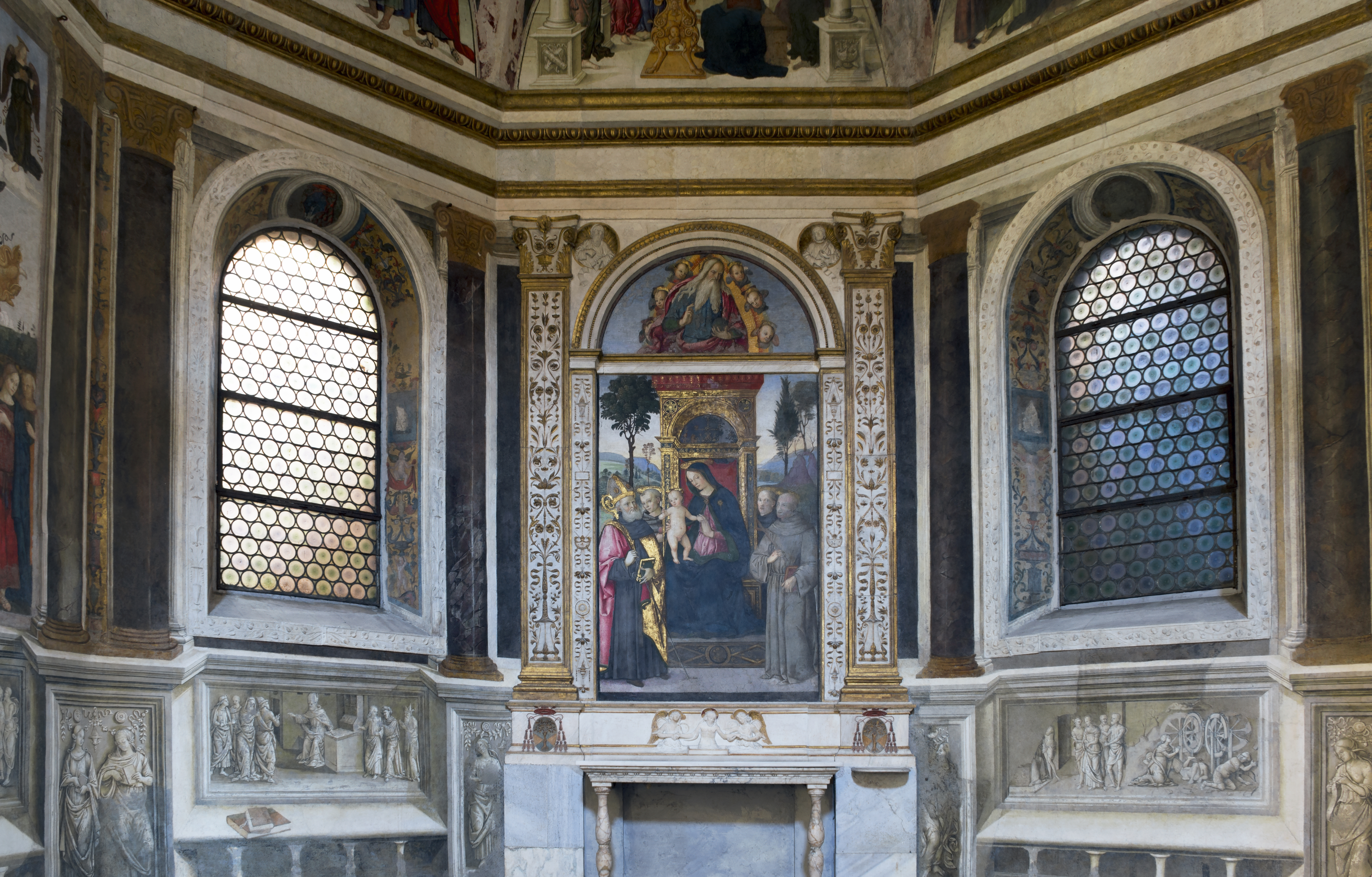
The chapel with the altarpiece of Pinturicchio

The Basso Della Rovere or Saint Augustine Chapel (Italian: Cappella Basso Della Rovere or Cappella di Sant'Agostino) is located in the south aisle of the basilica of Santa Maria del Popolo in Rome. This is the third side chapel from the counterfaçade and was dedicated to St. Augustine. The cycle of beautiful quattrocento frescoes was executed by Pinturicchio and his workshop.

== History ==
The chapel was furnished by Bishop Girolamo Basso della Rovere after his uncle, Pope Sixtus IV had reconstructed the basilica from 1472 to 1477. The painted decoration is attributed to Pinturicchio and his workshop, who worked here in an unspecified period between 1484 when the chapel was fitted, and 1492, when his patron received the bishopric of Palestrina instead of that of Recanati, which is mentioned in the dedicatory inscription on the monument of his father, Giovanni Basso.

== Description and style ==
Compared to the nearby Chapel of the Nativity, frescoed by the same Pinturicchio, the Basso Della Rovere Chapel has a greater decorative fervour. The small chapel is hexagonal with a sexpartite ribbed vault and the entrance is protected by a slim 15th-century balustrade. On the side walls, fake porphyry columns with Corinthian capitals support an entablature of white and gilded marble. They are placed on a pedestal which is decorated with painted benches and illusionistic monochrome reliefs. Two books were painted on one of the benches in perfect perspective, deceiving the viewer. The pedestal has remarkable similarities to the inlays of the small study of Guidobaldo da Montefeltro originally at Gubbio but now in the Metropolitan Museum of Art in New York. The monochromes were restored in the 19th century by Vincenzo Camuccini. The panels of the vault are covered by a lush floral decoration on a golden background with images of prophets in medaillons.

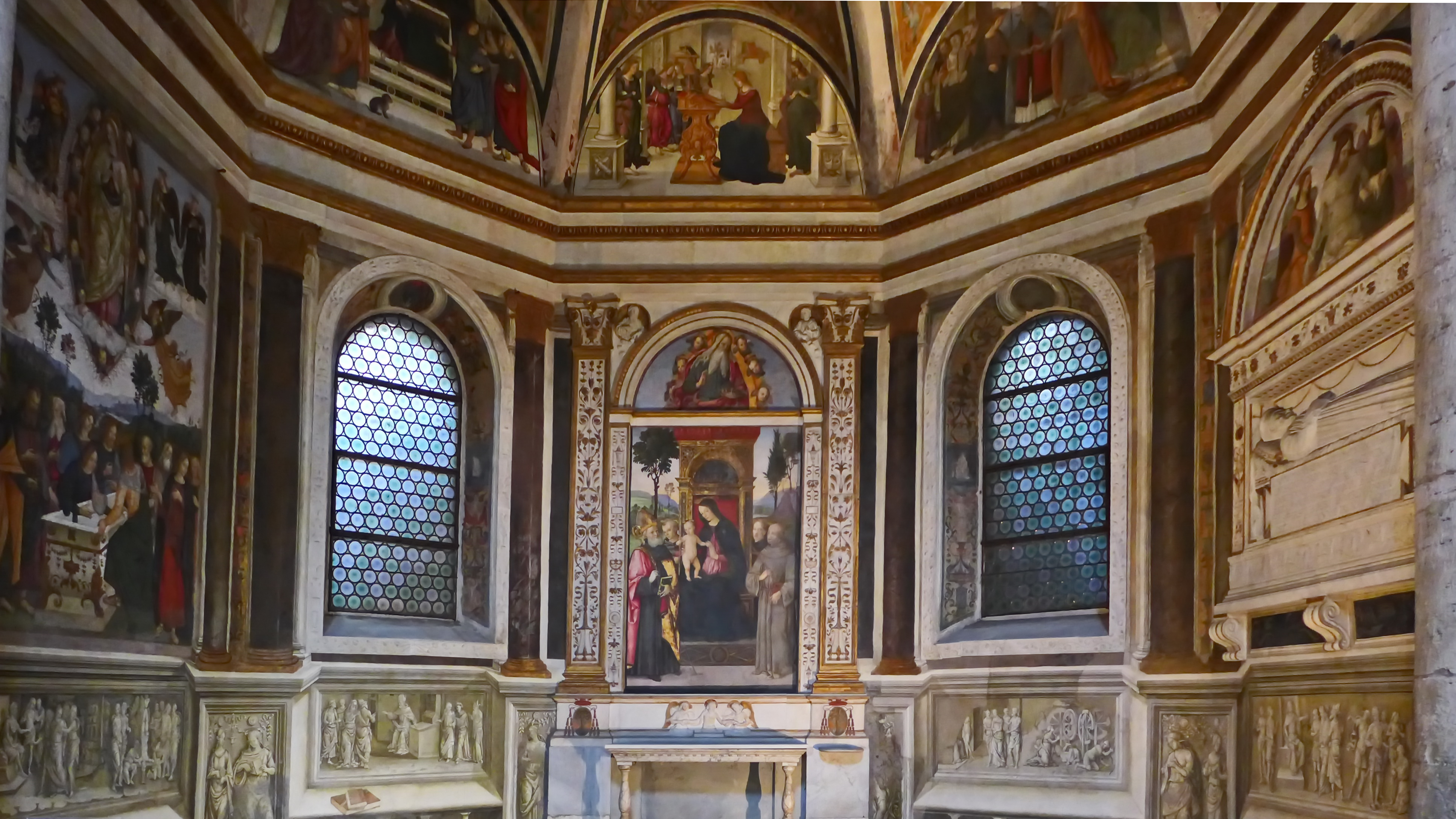
General view

The profusion of polychrome decoration is complemented by the maiolica floor tiles, and contemporary works from Deruta, which show heraldic devices, Della Rovere trees, animals, and other decorative motifs.

The five lunettes are decorated with Stories from the Life of the Virgin, now much damaged and repainted. The great fresco of the Madonna and Child Enthroned with Saints Augustine, Francis, Anthony of Padua and a Holy Monk above the altar, with a lunette that shows the God the Father Blessing, is enclosed by a white marble frame with rich golden decorations. There are two arched windows on the two adjacent walls with splays decorated with grotesques. The first wall is decorated by the fresco of the Assumption of the Virgin Mary while last section is covered by the funeral monument of Giovanni Basso (†1483). That was created around 1485 by the workshop of Andrea Bregno. Its design is analogous to the now truncated tomb of Pietro Mellini in the Mellini Chapel and other similar monuments in Rome. The handling is less refined when closely examined, but still a beautiful work.

The tomb is surmounted by a lunette fresco of the Dead Christ Supported by Two Angels attributed to Antonio da Viterbo. The marble Pietà above the altar is the work of Gian Cristoforo Romano.

The complex painted decoration, although in general following the Umbrian style, has the characteristics of multiple hands with very different individual accents. In addition to the assistants from the workshop of Pinturicchio and Perugino, the Bolognese Amico Aspertini may have participated in the stories of the martyrs on the false reliefs of the base, because he stayed in Rome in those years. One of the hands notably present in the main scenes, if not Pinturicchio himself, is assigned to a generic „Master of the Basso Della Rovere Chapel”, perhaps recognizable even in the frescoes of the Piccolomini Library in the Cathedral of Siena.

== Gallery ==
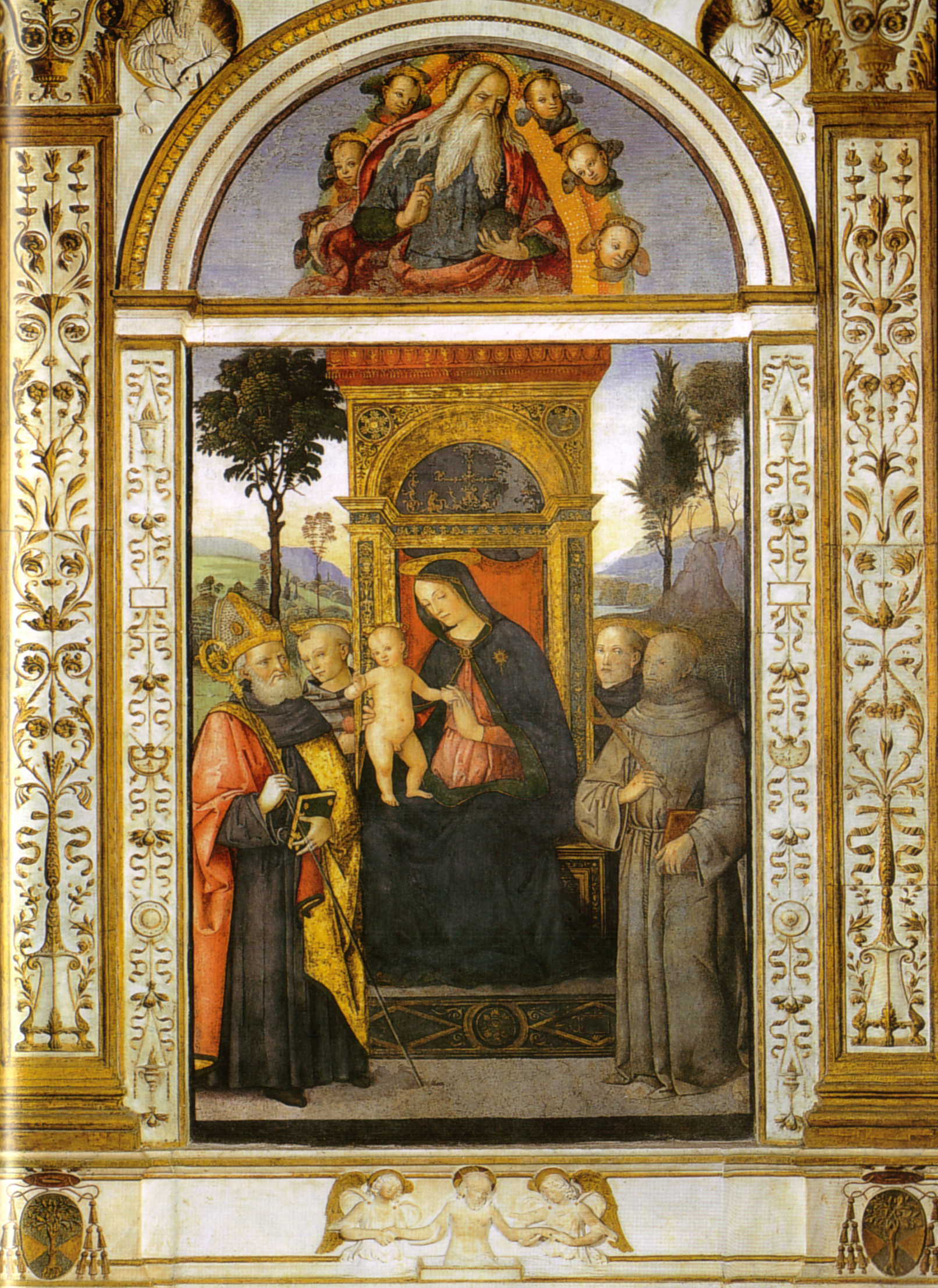
Pinturicchio: Madonna and Child Enthroned with Saints Augustine, Francis, Anthony of Padua and a Holy Monk

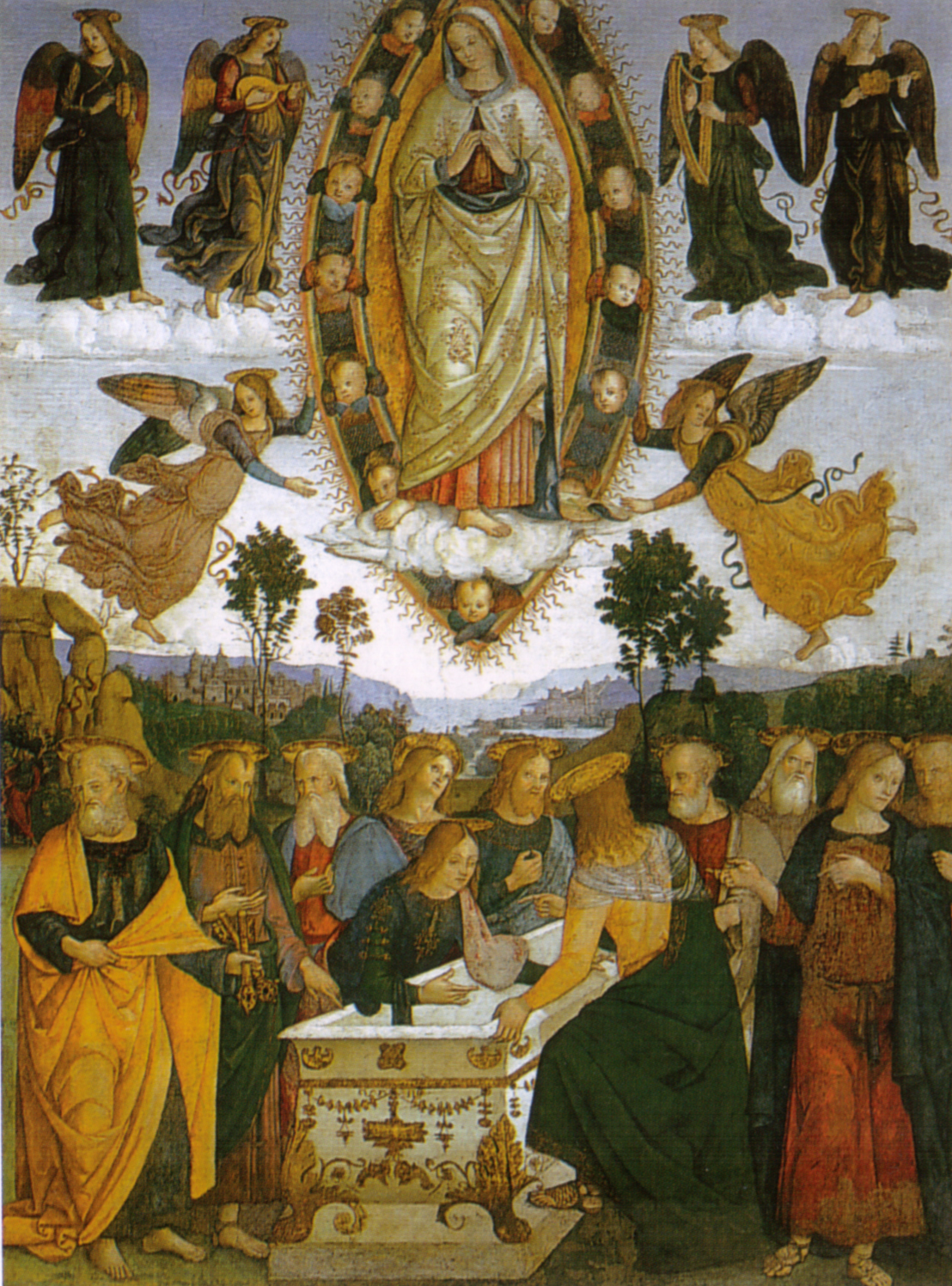
Pinturicchio: Assumption of the Virgin Mary

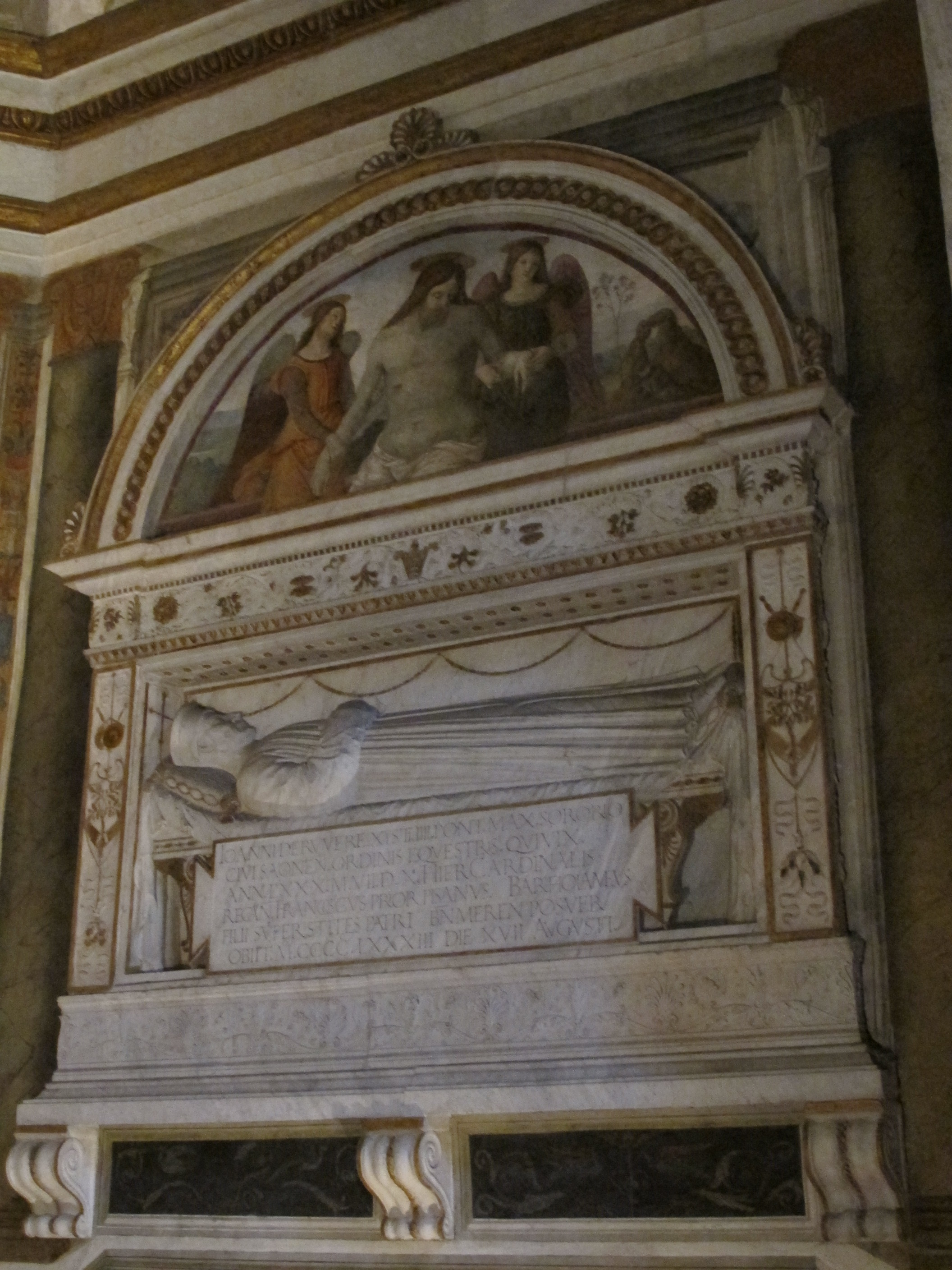
Funeral monument of Giovanni Basso

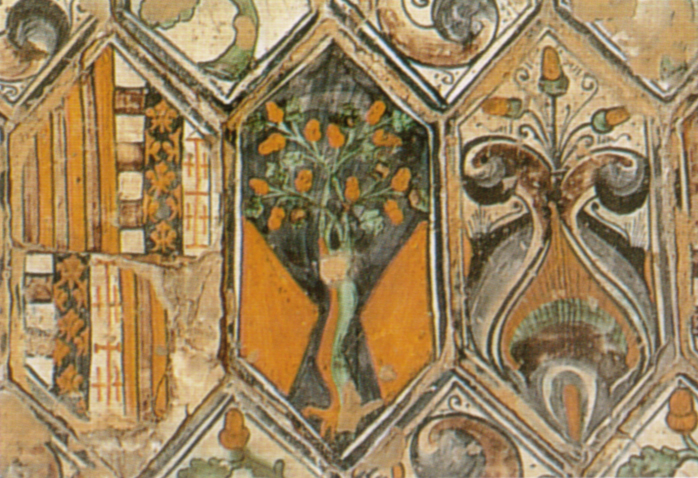
Maiolica floor tiles from Deruta

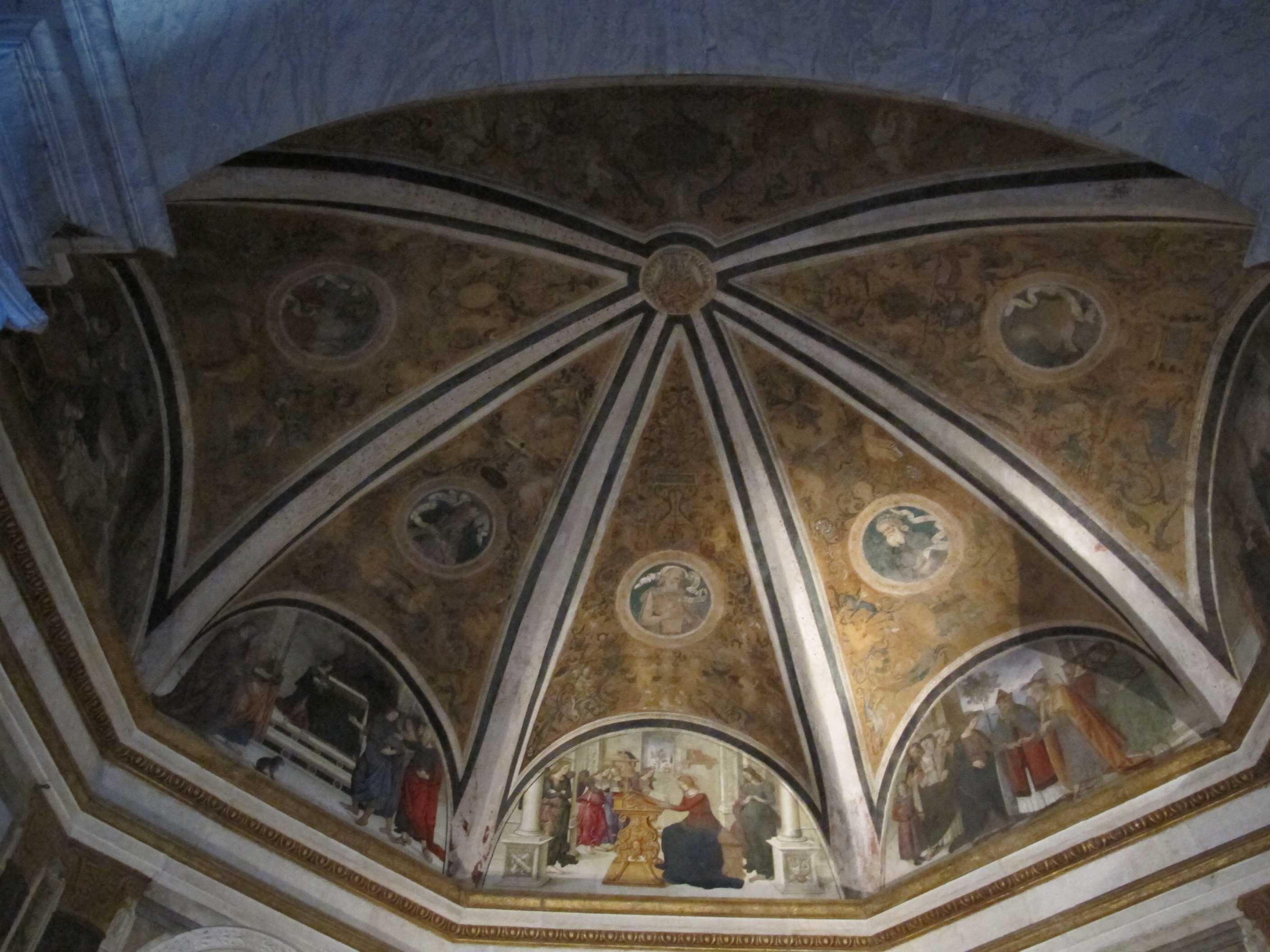
The vault and the lunettes

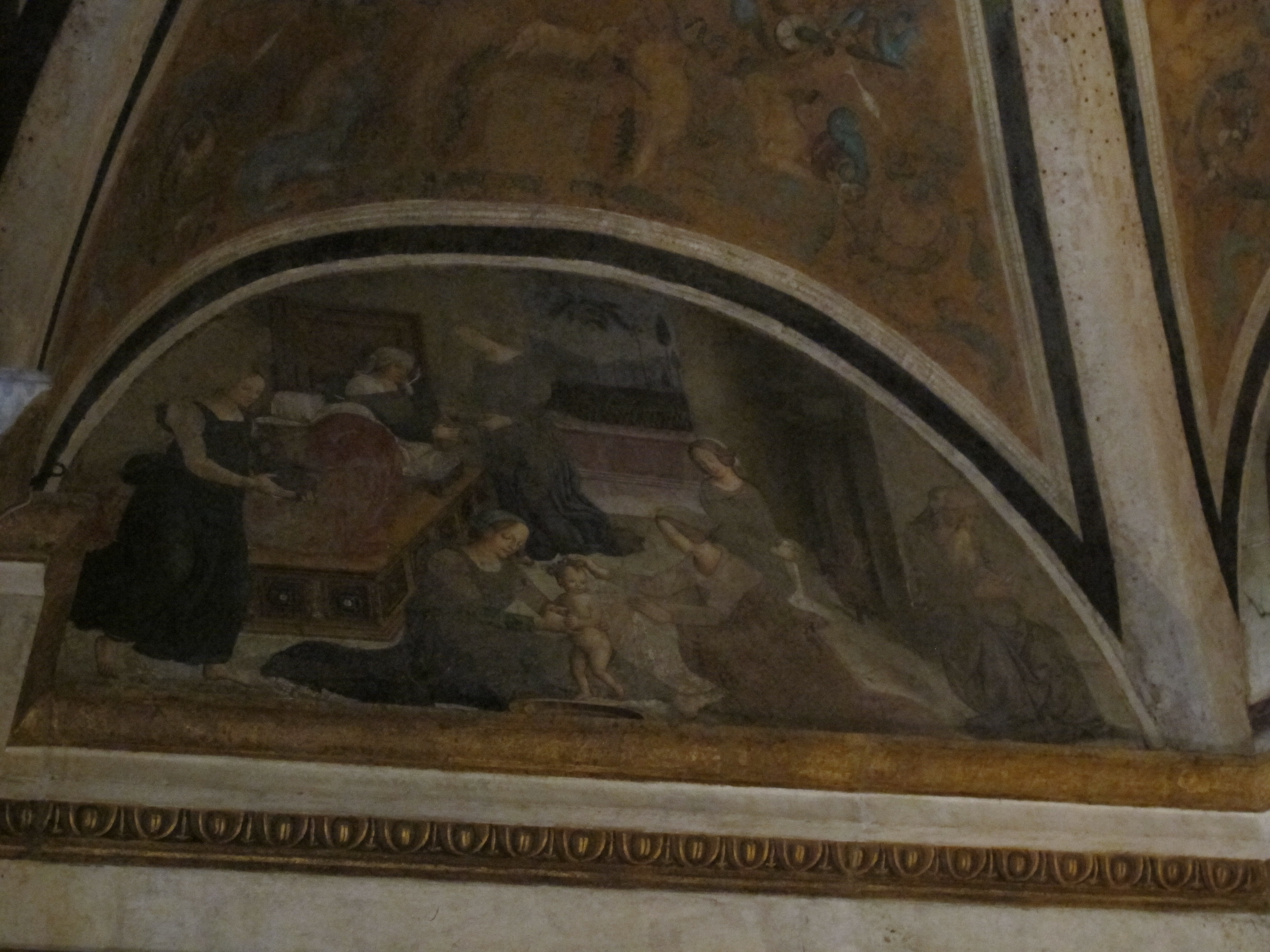
Birth of the Virgin (lunette)

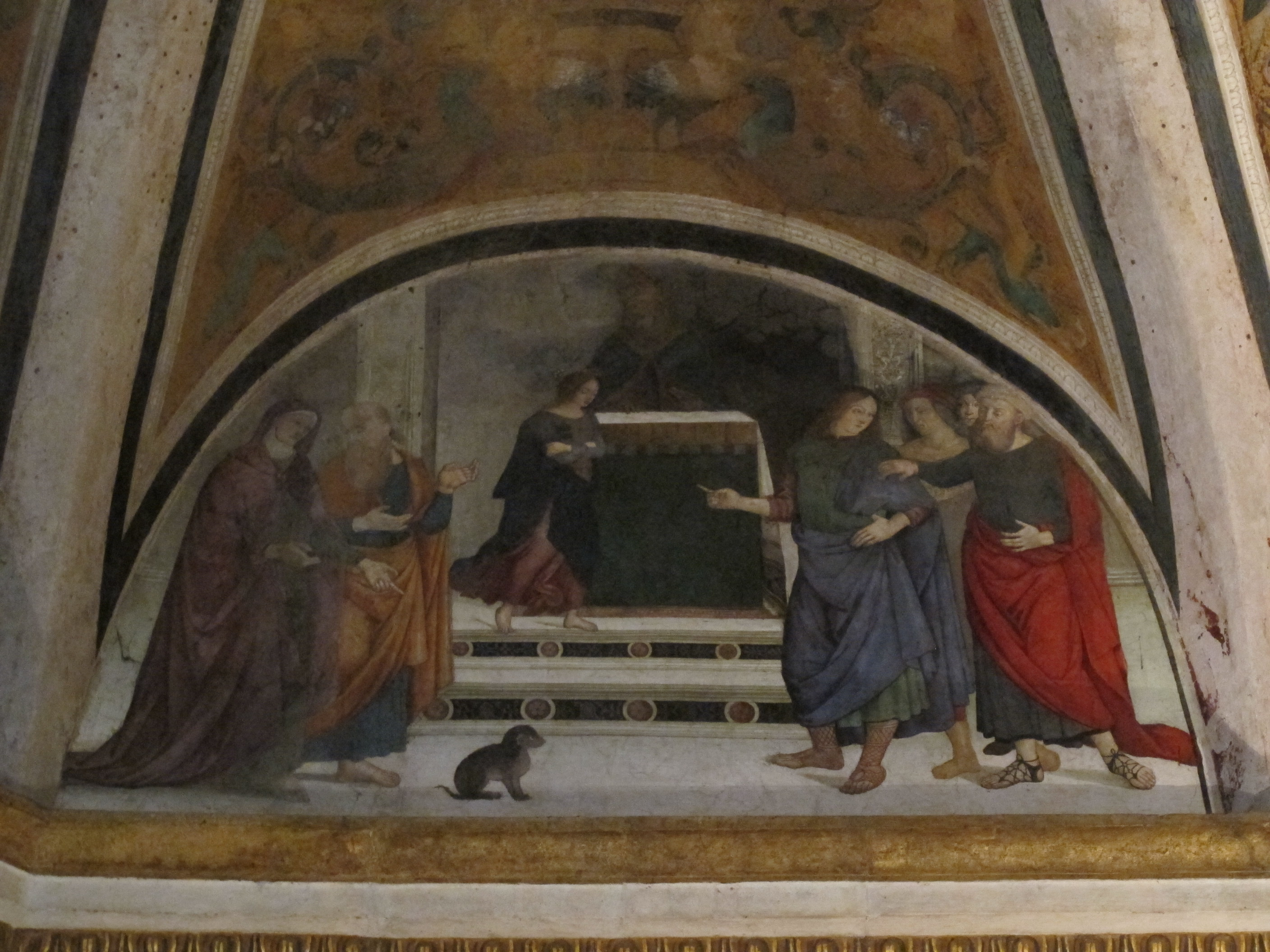
Presentation in the Temple (lunette)

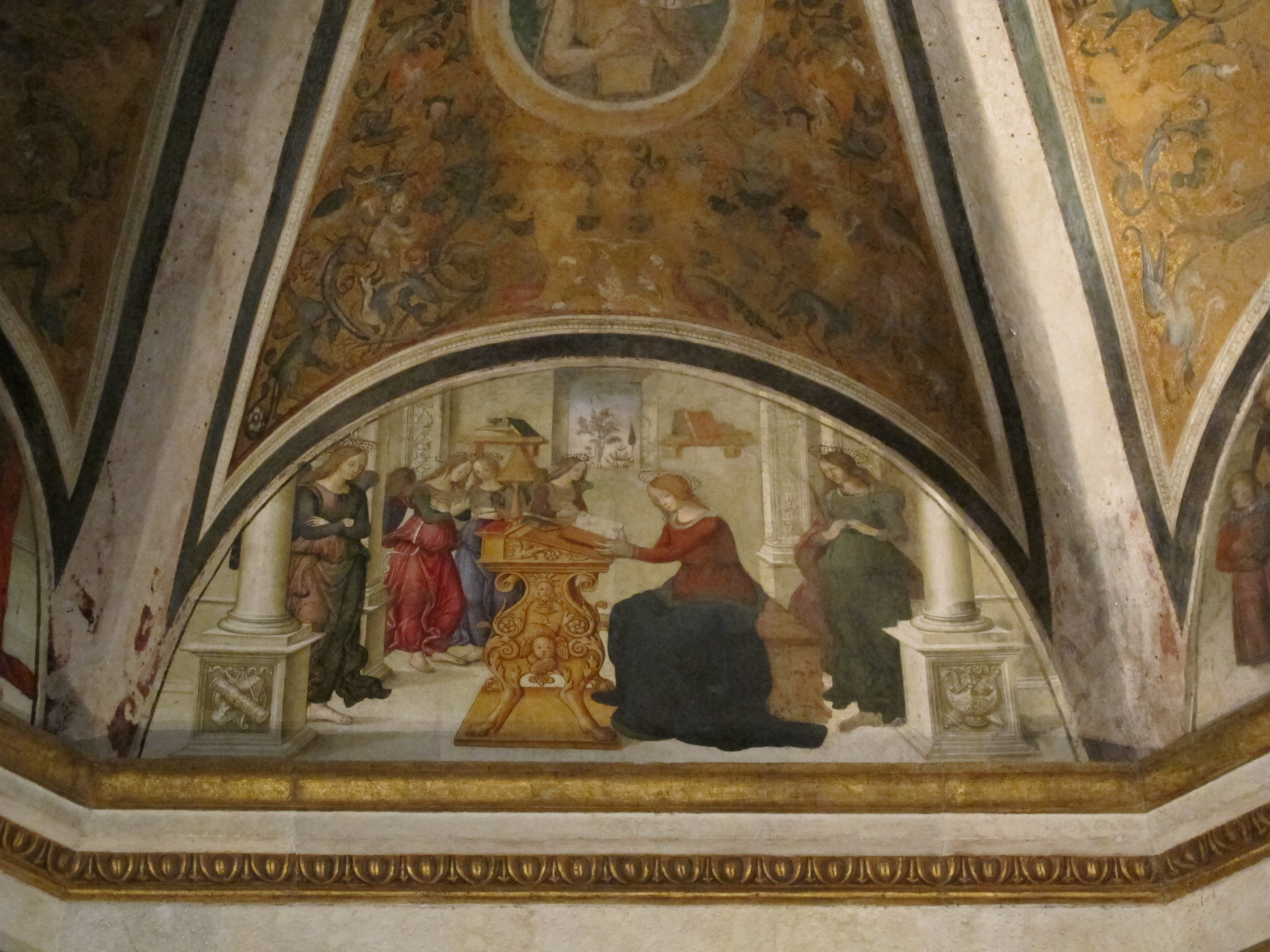
Education of the Virgin (lunette)

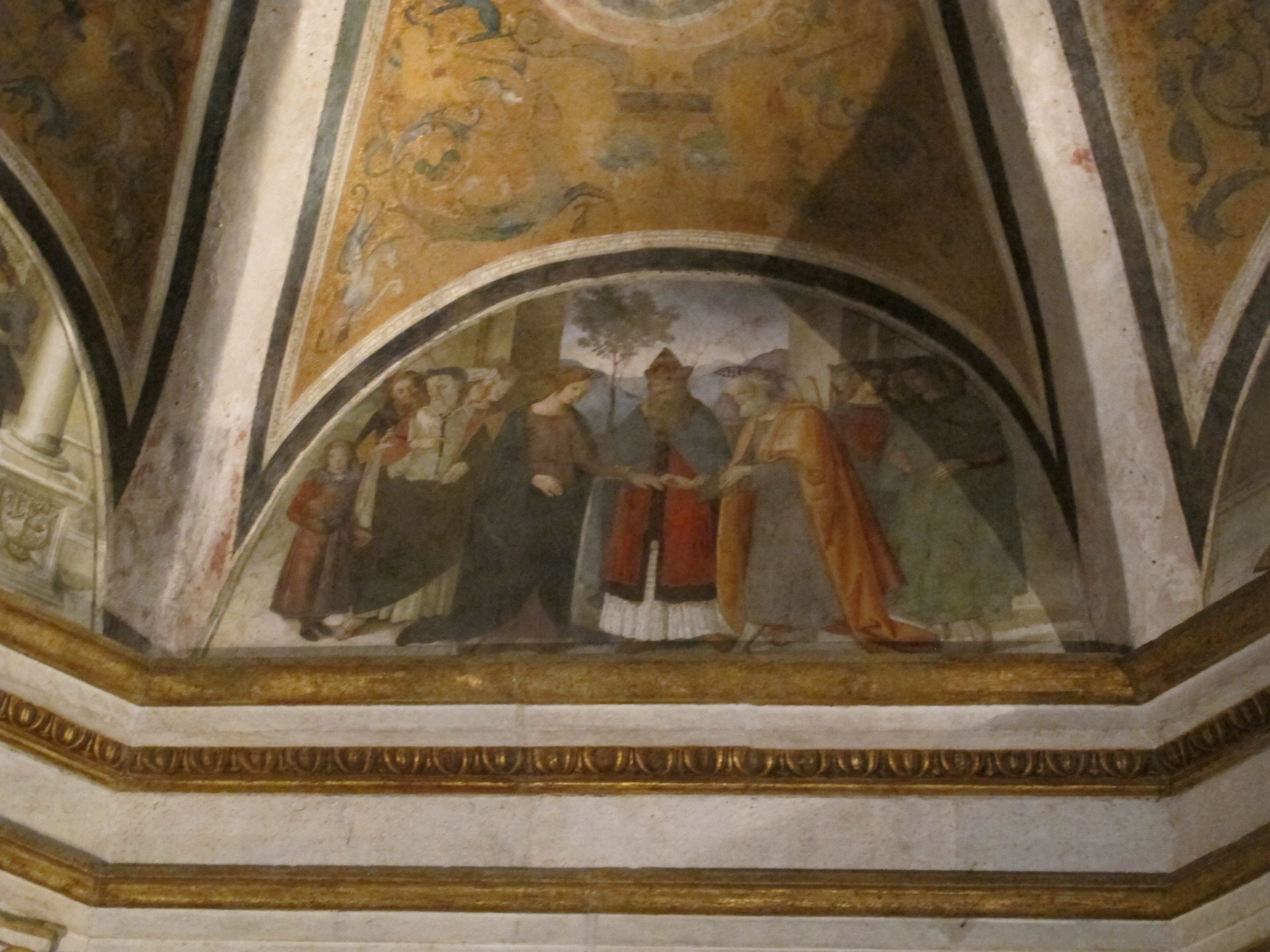
Nuptial of the Virgin (lunette)

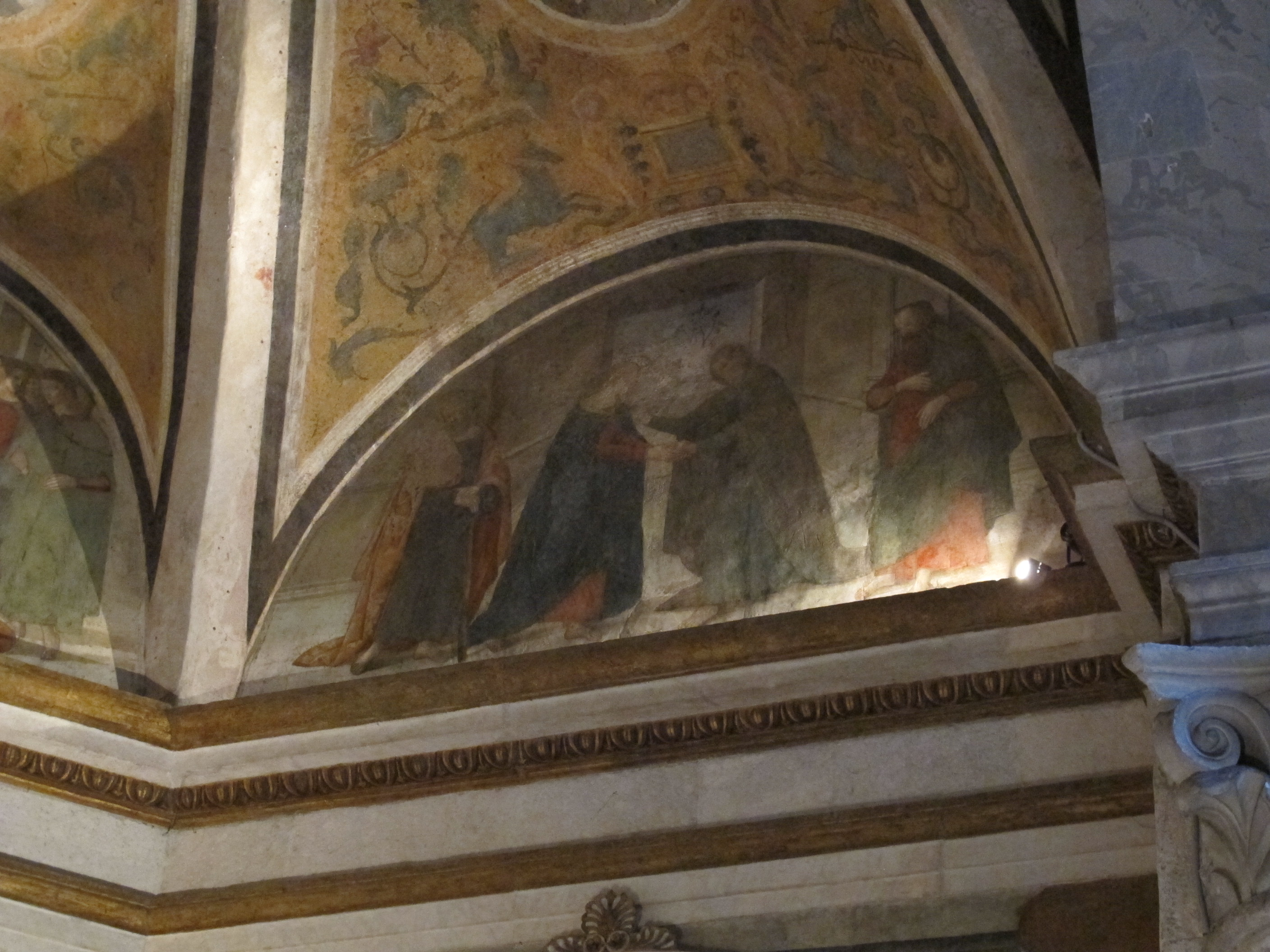
Visitation (lunette)

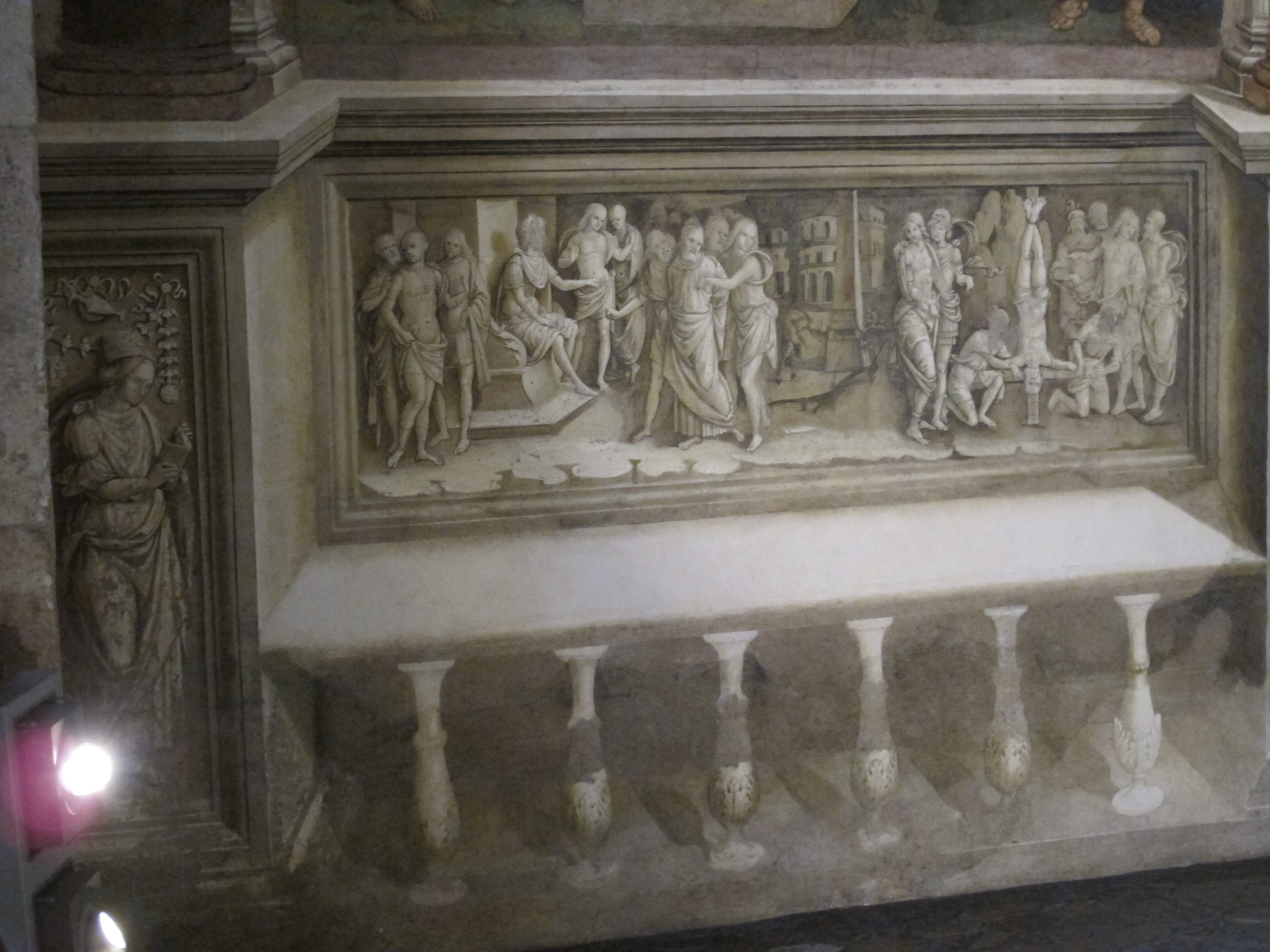
Martyrdom of St Peter (monochrome)

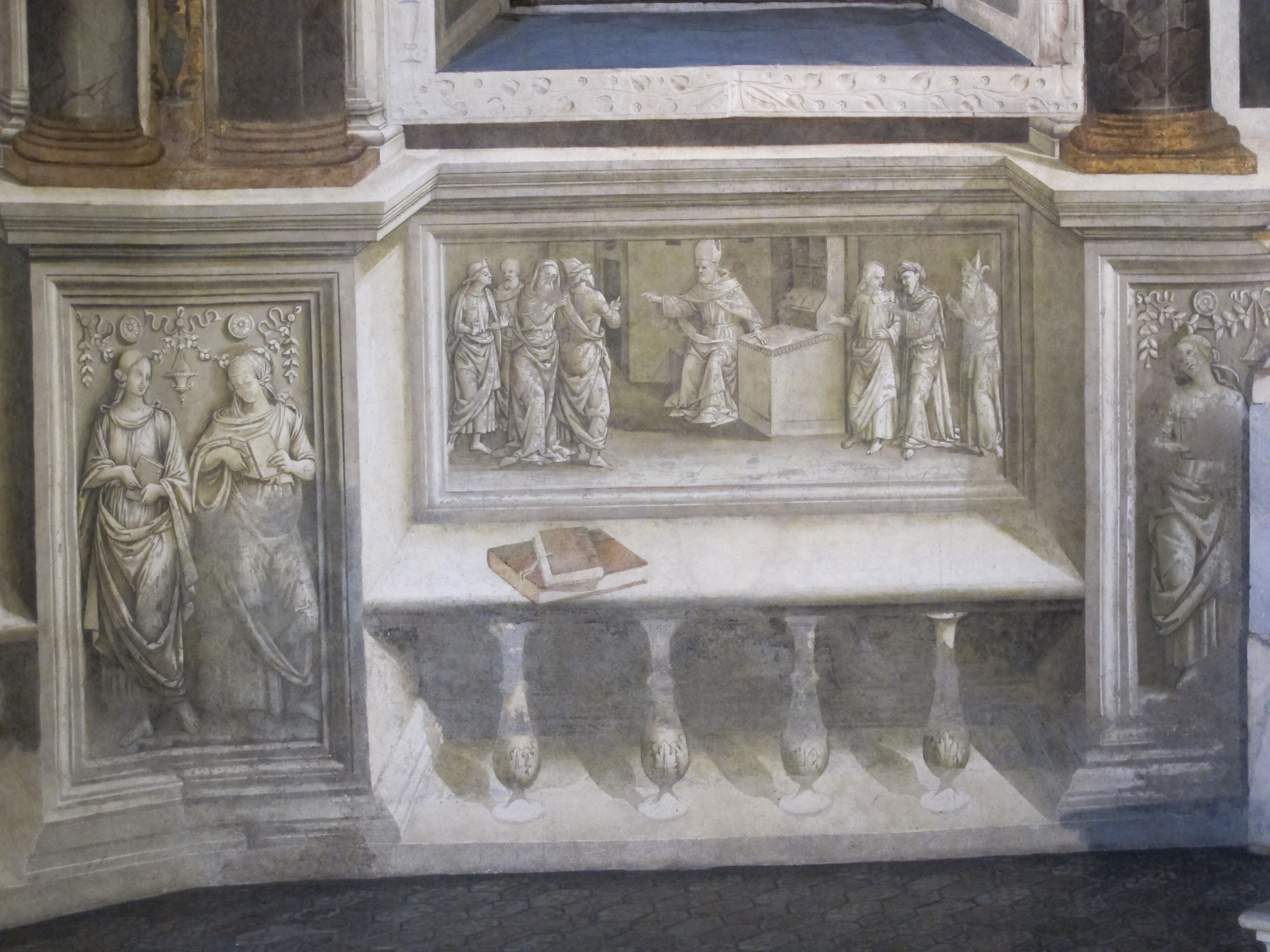
Dispute of St. Augustine with painted books (monochrome)

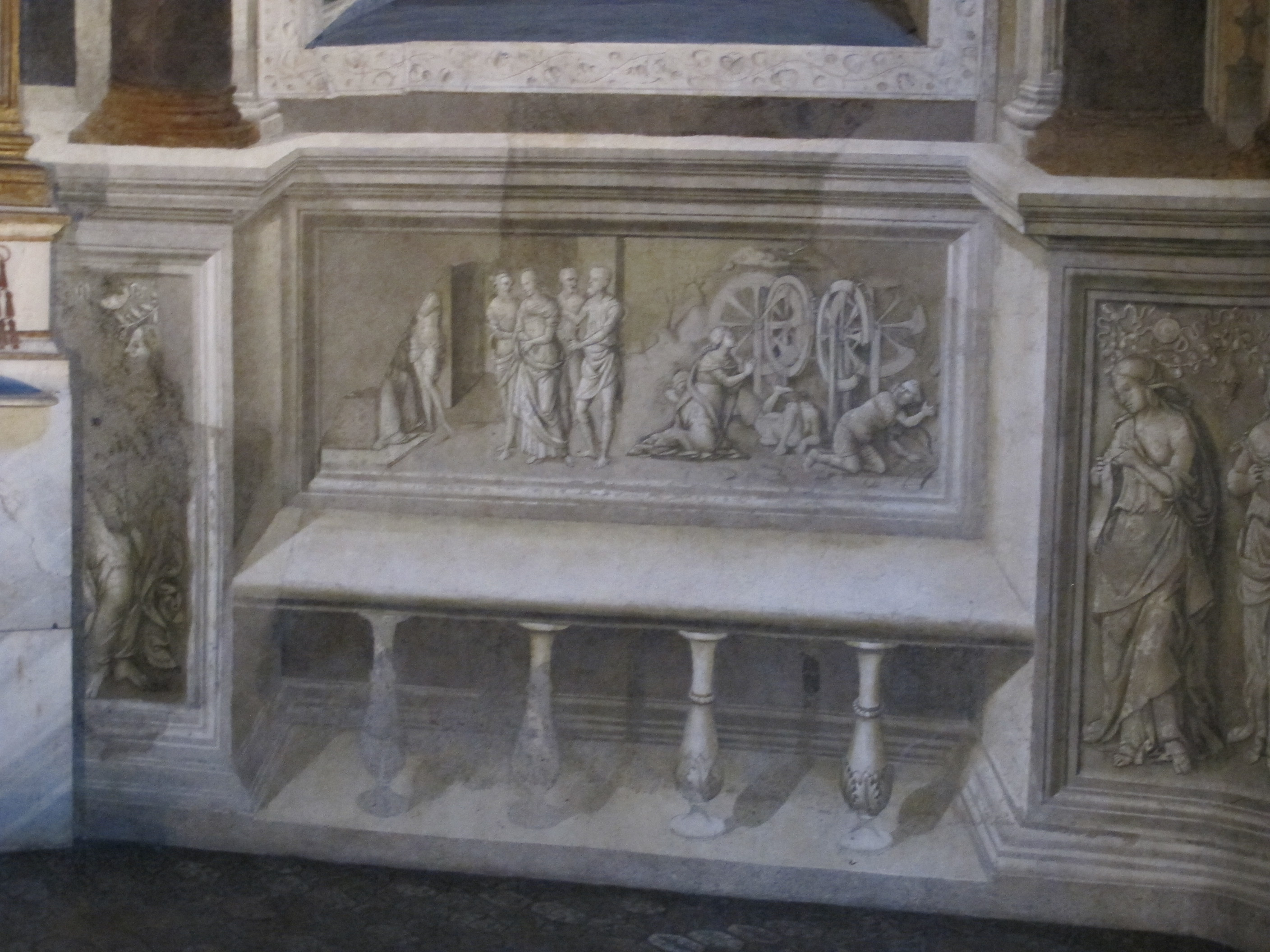
Martyrdom of St. Catherine (monochrome)

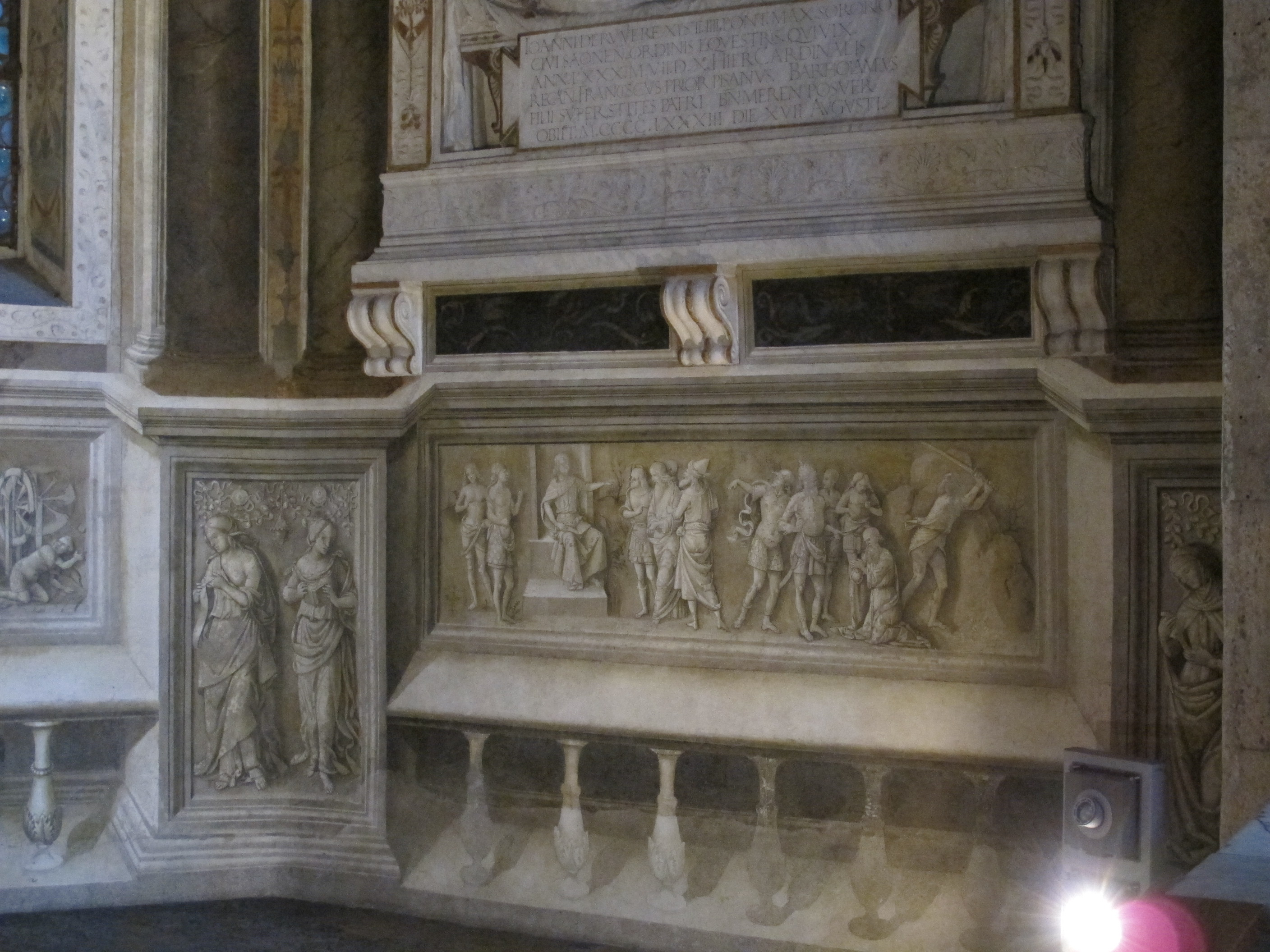
Martyrdom of St. Paul (monochrome)

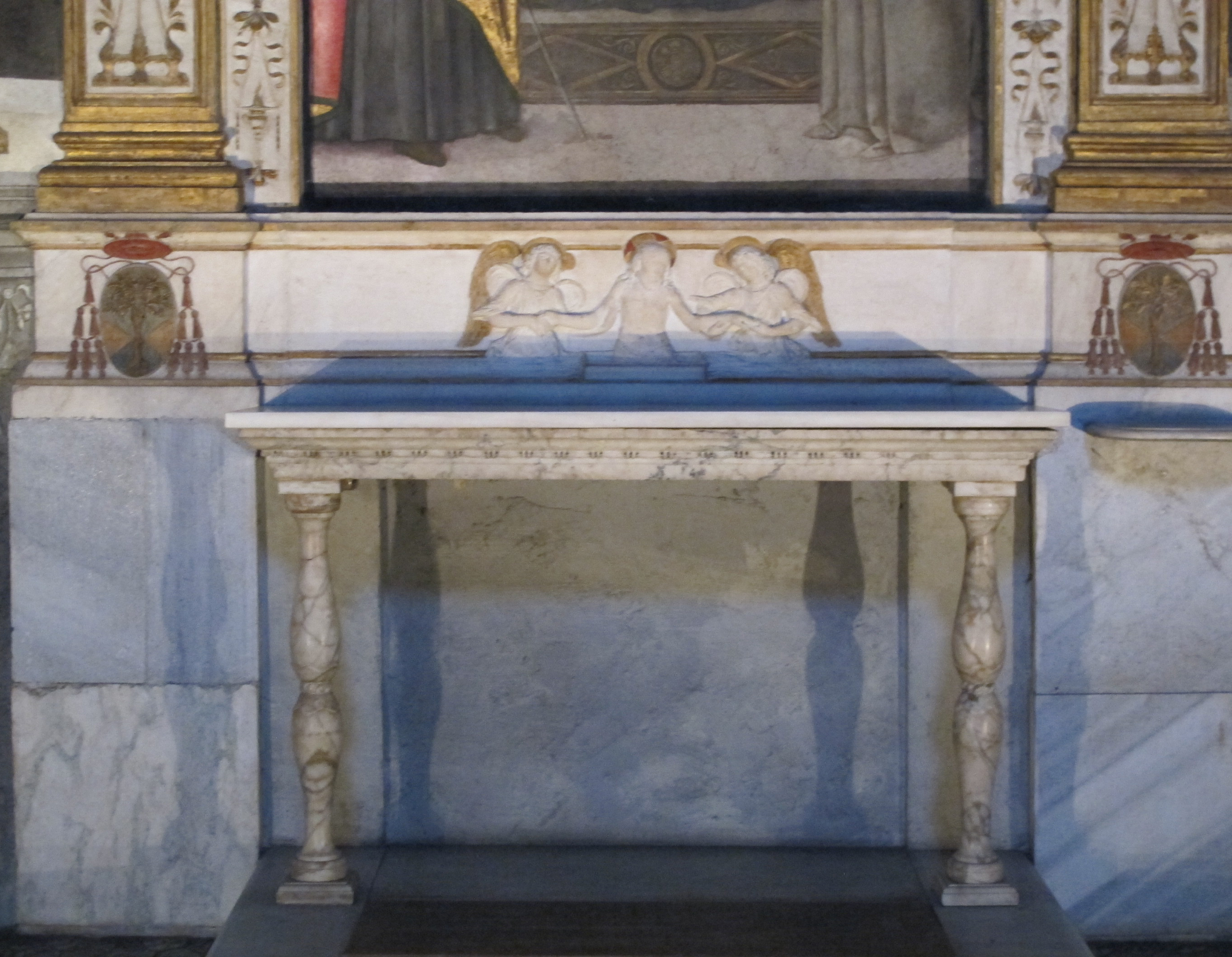
The altar is resting on slim balusters

== Bibliography ==
- Cristina Acidini, Pintoricchio, in Pittori del Rinascimento, Scala, Firenze 2004. ISBN 88-8117-099-X
- Gerald S. Davies: Renascence. The Sculptured Tombs of the Fifteenth Century in Rome, E. P. Dutton and Company, New York, 1916
