= Girolamo Basso della Rovere =

Italian Cardinal

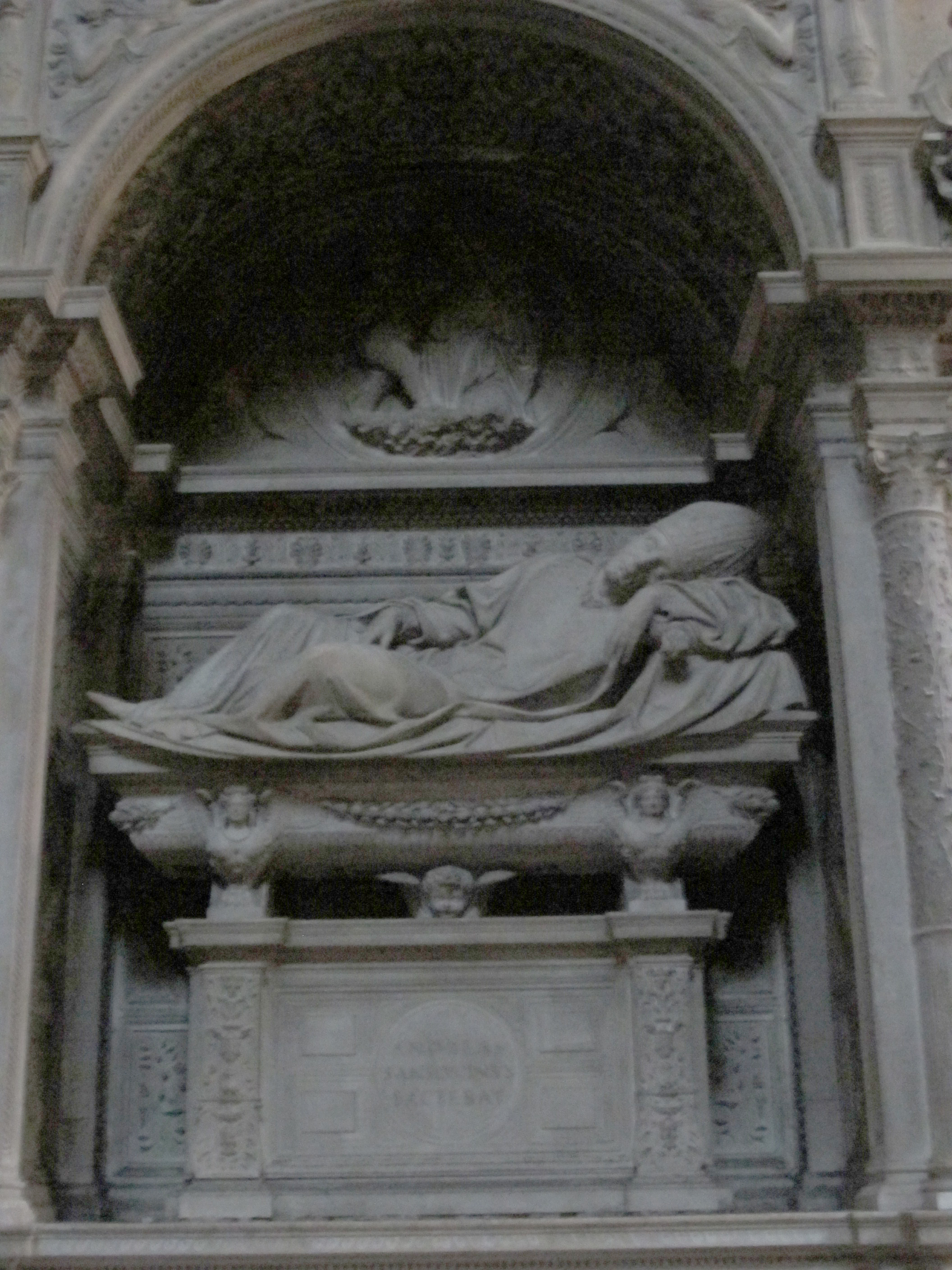
Tomb in Santa Maria del Popolo, created by Andrea Sansovino.

Girolamo Basso della Rovere (1434–1507) was an Italian Cardinal of the Roman Catholic Church.

== Life ==
Basso della Rovere was born in Albissola Marina, the son of Giovanni Basso (Marquess of Bistagno and Monastero) and his wife Luchina della Rovere of the House of della Rovere and sister of Pope Sixtus IV.

He was Bishop of Albenga in 1472, and then Bishop of Recanati in 1476. He was created cardinal on 10 December 1477 by his uncle, Pope Sixtus IV.

Between 1471 and 1484, he built a new family chapel in the Basilica of Santa Maria del Popolo in Rome, the same church that his relatives, Pope Sixtus IV and Domenico della Rovere, significantly rebuilt and embellished. The Basso Della Rovere Chapel was decorated by the favourite artist of the family, Pinturicchio, and his workshop. Girolamo's father, Giovanni Basso, was buried in the chapel.

Catholic Church titles
| Preceded by | Bishop of Albenga; 1472–1476 | Succeeded by Leonardo Marchesi |
| Preceded by Andrea de Fano | Bishop of Recanati; 1476–1507 | Succeeded by Teseo de Cupis |
| Preceded by | Bishop of Macerata; 1476–1507 | Succeeded by Teseo de Cupis |
| Preceded by Giovanni Battista Cibò | Cardinal-Priest of Santa Balbina; 1477–1479 | Succeeded by Juan Margarit i Pau |
| Preceded by Giacomo Ammannati-Piccolomini | Cardinal-Priest of San Crisogono; 1479–1492 | Succeeded by Giovanni Battista Ferrari |
| Preceded by Leonardo Griffis | Administrator of Gubbio; 1482–1492 | Succeeded by Francesco Grosso della Rovere |
| Preceded by Giovanni Michiel | Cardinal-Bishop of Palestrina; 1492–1503 | Succeeded by Lorenzo Cibo de' Mari |
| Preceded by Oliviero Carafa | Cardinal-Bishop of Sabina; 1503–1507 | Succeeded by Raffaele Sansone Riario |
