= Galeazzo Moroni =

17th-century Roman Catholic bishop

Most Reverend Galeazzo Moroni
- Bishop of Macerata e Tolentino
- Church: Catholic Church
- Diocese: Diocese of Macerata e Tolentino
- In office: 1586–1613
- Predecessor: Gerolamo Melchiori
- Successor: Rutilio Benzoni

Orders
- Consecration: 28 June 1573 by Charles Borromeo

Personal details
- Born: 1534 or 1535 Milan, Duchy of Milan
- Died: 1 September 1613 (aged 78) Macerata, Papal States
- Buried: Macerata Cathedral

Galeazzo Moroni or Galeazzo Morone (c. 1535 – 1613) was a Roman Catholic prelate who served as Bishop of Macerata e Tolentino (1586–1613), Bishop of Recanati (1573–1592),, Bishop of Macerata (1573–1586).

== Biography ==
On 10 Jun 1573, Galeazzo Moroni was appointed during the papacy of Pope Gregory XIII as Bishop of Macerata and Bishop of Recanati. In 1573, he was consecrated bishop by Charles Borromeo, Archbishop of Milan. On 10 Dec 1586, his title was changed to Bishop of Macerata e Tolentino after the diocese was merged with the Diocese of Tolentino. He resigned as Bishop of Recanati on 9 Feb 1592. He served as Bishop of Macerata e Tolentino until his death on 1 Sep 1613.

While bishop, he was the principal co-consecrator of Giovanni Antonio Onorati, Bishop of Terni (1591); and Settimio Borsari, Bishop of Alessano (1591).

Catholic Church titles
Preceded by Gerolamo Melchiori	Bishop of Macerata / Bishop of Macerata e Tolentino; 1573–1586 and 1586–1613	Succeeded by Felice Centini
Preceded by Gerolamo Melchiori	Bishop of Recanati; 1573–1592	Succeeded by Rutilio Benzoni
