= Rutilio Benzoni =

1xth-century Roman Catholic bishop

Most Reverend Rutilio Benzoni
- Bishop of Recanati e Loreto
- Church: Catholic Church
- Diocese: Diocese of Recanati e Loreto
- In office: 1592–1613
- Predecessor: Galeazzo Moroni
- Successor: Agostino Galamini

Orders
- Consecration: 28 Dec 1586 by Decio Azzolini (seniore)

Personal details
- Born: 1542
- Died: 31 Jan 1613 (age 71)

Rutilio Benzoni (1542–1613) was a Roman Catholic prelate who served as Bishop of Recanati e Loreto (1592–1613) and Bishop of Loreto (1586–1592).

== Biography ==
Rutilio Benzoni was born in 1542. On 16 Dec 1586, he was appointed during the papacy of Pope Sixtus V as Bishop of Loreto. On 28 Dec 1586, he was consecrated bishop by Decio Azzolini (seniore), Bishop of Cervia, with Giulio Ricci, Bishop of Teramo, and Vincenzo Casali, Bishop of Massa Marittima, serving as co-consecrators. On 9 Feb 1592, he was named as Bishop of Recanati e Loreto after the diocese was merged with the Diocese of Recanati. He served as Bishop of Recanati e Loreto until his death on 31 Jan 1613.

While bishop, he was the principal co-consecrator of Marcello Crescenzi, Bishop of Assisi (1591); and Paolo Emilio Sfondrati, Bishop of Cremona (1607).

== External links and additional sources ==
- Cheney, David M. "Diocese of Loreto". Catholic-Hierarchy.org. (for Chronology of Bishops) ^{[self-published]}
- Chow, Gabriel. "Territorial Prelature of Loreto (Italy)". GCatholic.org. (for Chronology of Bishops) ^{[self-published]}
- Cheney, David M. "Diocese of Recanati". Catholic-Hierarchy.org. (for Chronology of Bishops) ^{[self-published]}
- Chow, Gabriel. "Diocese of Recanati (Italy)". GCatholic.org. (for Chronology of Bishops) ^{[self-published]}

Catholic Church titles
Preceded by Francesco Cantucci	Bishop of Loreto; 1586–1592	Succeeded by None
Preceded by Galeazzo Moroni	Bishop of Recanati e Loreto; 1592–1613	Succeeded by Agostino Galamini
