= Filippo Roccabella =

16th-century Roman Catholic bishop

Most Reverend Filippo Roccabella
- Bishop of Recanati
- Church: Catholic Church
- Diocese: Diocese of Recanati
- In office: 1553–1571
- Predecessor: Giovanni Domenico de Cupis
- Successor: Gerolamo Melchiori

Orders
- Consecration: 22 Aug 1546 by Giovanni Giacomo Barba

Personal details
- Died: 1571

Filippo Roccabella or Filippo Riccabella (died 1571) was a Roman Catholic prelate who served as Bishop of Recanati (1553–1571) and Bishop of Macerata (1546–1553).

== Biography ==
On 27 Jan 1546, Filippo Roccabella was appointed during the papacy of Pope Paul III as Bishop of Macerata. On 22 Aug 1546, he was consecrated bishop by Giovanni Giacomo Barba, Bishop of Teramo, with Giovanni Andrea Mercurio, Archbishop of Manfredonia, and Jérome Buccaurati, Bishop of Acci, serving as co-consecrators. On 6 Mar 1553, he was appointed during the papacy of Pope Julius III as Bishop of Recanati. He served as Bishop of Recanati until his death in 1571.

While bishop, he was the principal co-consecrator of Jean de Bertrand (cardinal), Bishop of Comminges (1560) .

== External links and additional sources ==
- Cheney, David M. "Diocese of Macerata–Tolentino–Recanati–Cingoli–Treia". Catholic-Hierarchy.org. (for Chronology of Bishops) ^{[self-published]}
- Chow, Gabriel. "Diocese of Macerata–Tolentino–Recanati–Cingoli–Treia (Italy)". GCatholic.org. (for Chronology of Bishops) ^{[self-published]}
- Cheney, David M. "Diocese of Recanati". Catholic-Hierarchy.org. (for Chronology of Bishops) ^{[self-published]}
- Chow, Gabriel. "Diocese of Recanati (Italy)". GCatholic.org. (for Chronology of Bishops) ^{[self-published]}

Catholic Church titles
Preceded by Giovanni Leclerc	Bishop of Macerata; 1546–1553	Succeeded by Gerolamo Melchiori
Preceded by Giovanni Domenico de Cupis	Bishop of Recanati; 1553–1571	Succeeded by Gerolamo Melchiori
