= Teseo de Cupis =

Italian Roman Catholic prelate

Most Reverend Teseo de Cupis
- Bishop of Macerata
- Church: Catholic Church
- Diocese: Diocese of Macerata
- In office: 1507–1528
- Predecessor: Girolamo Basso Della Rovere
- Successor: Giovanni Domenico de Cupis

Personal details
- Died: 1528 Macerata, Italy

Teseo de Cupis or Teseo de Cuppis (died 1528) was a Roman Catholic prelate who served as Bishop of Macerata (1507–1528) and Bishop of Recanati (1507–1516).

== Biography ==
On 20 October 1507, Teseo de Cupis was appointed during the papacy of Pope Julius II as Bishop of Macerata and Bishop of Recanati. On 16 January 1516, he resigned as Bishop of Recanati. He served as Bishop of Macerata until his death in 1528.

== External links and additional sources ==
- Cheney, David M. "Diocese of Macerata–Tolentino–Recanati–Cingoli–Treia". Catholic-Hierarchy.org. (for Chronology of Bishops) ^{[self-published]}
- Chow, Gabriel. "Diocese of Macerata–Tolentino–Recanati–Cingoli–Treia (Italy)". GCatholic.org. (for Chronology of Bishops) ^{[self-published]}
- Cheney, David M. "Diocese of Recanati". Catholic-Hierarchy.org. (for Chronology of Bishops) ^{[self-published]}
- Chow, Gabriel. "Diocese of Recanati (Italy)". GCatholic.org. (for Chronology of Bishops) ^{[self-published]}

Catholic Church titles
Preceded by	Bishop of Recanati; 1516–1528	Succeeded by Luigi Tasso
Preceded by Girolamo Basso Della Rovere	Bishop of Macerata; 1507–1528	Succeeded by Giovanni Domenico de Cupis
