= Gerolamo Melchiori =

16th-century Roman Catholic bishop

Most Reverend Gerolamo Melchiori
- Bishop of Recanati
- Church: Catholic Church
- Diocese: Diocese of Recanati
- In office: 1573–1583
- Predecessor: Filippo Roccabella
- Successor: Galeazzo Moroni

Orders
- Consecration: 16 December 1554 by Giovanni Michele Saraceni

Personal details
- Died: 1583

Gerolamo Melchiori or Gerolamo Melchiorri (died 1583) was a Roman Catholic prelate who served as Bishop of Recanati (1573–1583) and Bishop of Macerata (1553–1573).

== Biography ==
On 6 March 1553, Gerolamo Melchiori was appointed during the papacy of Pope Julius III as Bishop of Macerata. On 16 December 1554, he was consecrated bishop by Giovanni Michele Saraceni, Archbishop of Acerenza e Matera, with Ascanio Ferreri, Bishop Emeritus of Montepeloso, and Giovanni Andrea Croce, Bishop of Tivoli, serving as co-consecrators. On 15 October 1571, he was appointed during the papacy of Pope Pius V as Bishop of Recanati. In 1571, he resigned as Bishop of Macerata. He served as Bishop of Recanati until his death in 1583. While bishop, he was the principal co-consecrator of Benedetto Lomellini, Bishop of Luni e Sarzana (1565); and Giulio Sauli, Bishop of Brugnato (1566) .

== External links and additional sources ==
- Cheney, David M. "Diocese of Recanati". Catholic-Hierarchy.org. (for Chronology of Bishops) ^{[self-published]}
- Chow, Gabriel. "Diocese of Recanati (Italy)". GCatholic.org. (for Chronology of Bishops) ^{[self-published]}
- Cheney, David M. "Diocese of Macerata–Tolentino–Recanati–Cingoli–Treia". Catholic-Hierarchy.org. (for Chronology of Bishops) ^{[self-published]}
- Chow, Gabriel. "Diocese of Macerata–Tolentino–Recanati–Cingoli–Treia (Italy)". GCatholic.org. (for Chronology of Bishops) ^{[self-published]}

Catholic Church titles
Preceded by Filippo Roccabella	Bishop of Macerata; 1553–1573	Succeeded by Galeazzo Moroni
Preceded by Filippo Roccabella	Bishop of Recanati; 1573–1583	Succeeded by Galeazzo Moroni
