= Michele Bonelli =

Italian diplomat

His Eminence Michele Bonelli
- Camerlengo of the Holy Roman Church
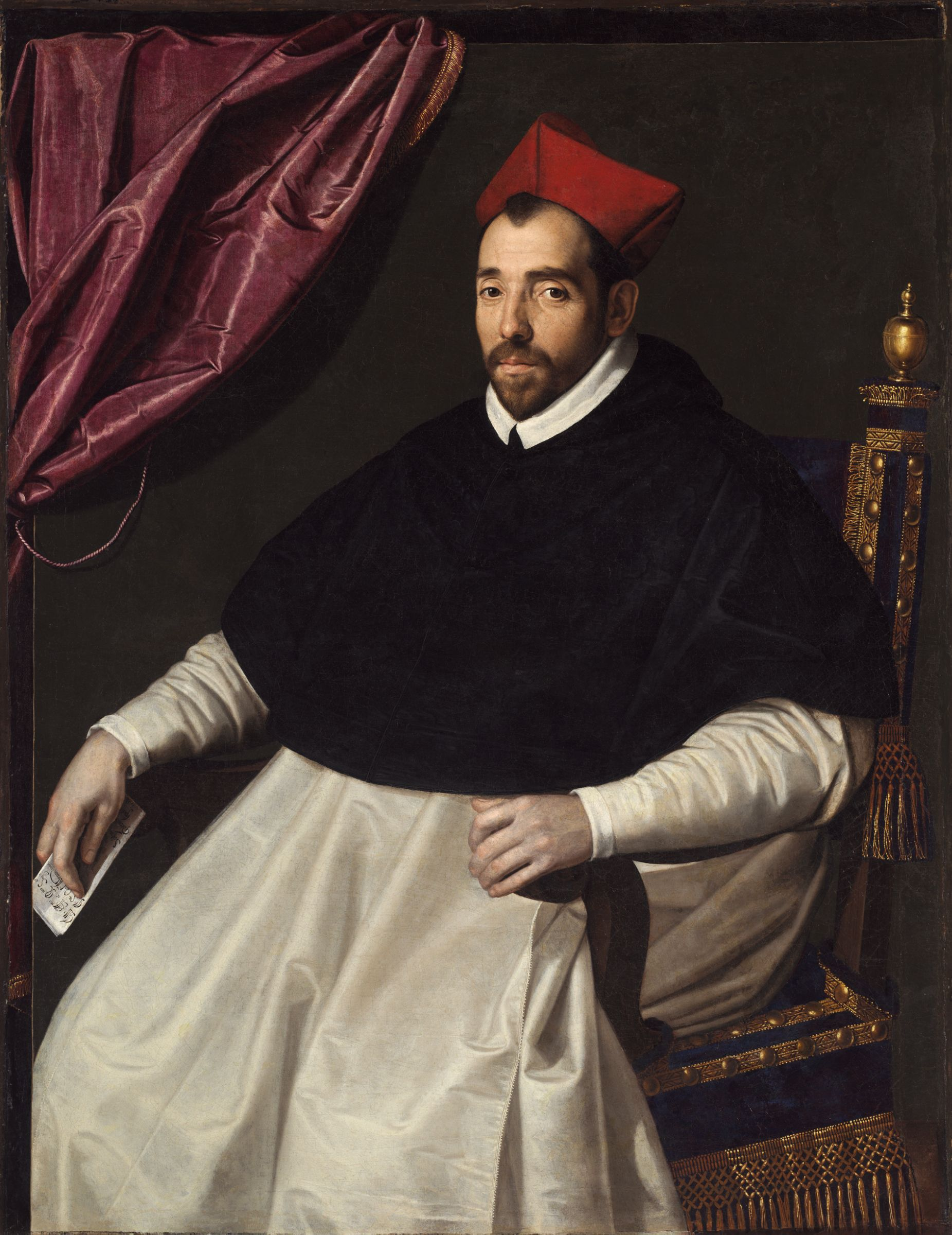
- Church: Catholic Church
- Appointed: 3 December 1568
- Term ended: 10 May 1570
- Predecessor: Vitellozzo Vitelli
- Successor: Luigi Cornaro
- Other posts: Abbot of Sacra di San Michele (1585-1598); Cardinal-Bishop of Albano (1591–1598)
- Previous posts: Cardinal-Priest of Santa Maria sopra Minerva (1566–1589)

Orders
- Created cardinal: 6 March 1566 by Pope Pius V
- Rank: Cardinal-Bishop

Personal details
- Born: 25 November 1541 Bosco Marengo, Savoy
- Died: 28 March 1598 (aged 56) Rome, Papal States
- Buried: Santa Maria sopra Minerva

Styles of Michele Bonelli
- Reference style: His Eminence
- Spoken style: Your Eminence
- Informal style: Cardinal
- See: Santa Maria Sopra Minerva

Michele Bonelli, Cardinal Alessandrino (25 November 1541– 28 March 1598) was an Italian senior papal diplomat with a distinguished career that spanned two decades from 1571.

== Biography ==
Born in Bosco Marengo, in the Duchy of Savoy, he was the son of Marco Bonelli, inscribed as a noble of Alessandria in Piedmont, 1566, and of Dominina de' Gibertis, niece of Pope Pius V. He was the great-uncle of Cardinal Carlo Bonelli (1664).

He entered the preaching Order of Dominicans, taking the name Michele, and professed at the convent of Santa Maria sopra Minerva, Rome, 1559. He studied at the Collegio Germanico and was a professor of theology at the University of Perugia before being recalled to Rome by his great-uncle, Pius V.

He was created cardinal priest in the consistory of 6 March 1566; received the red hat and the titulus of Santa Maria sopra Minerva on 20 March and was entered with his father as a noble of Alessandria the same year; he conditioned his promotion on permission to continue wearing his Dominican habit. He was made Grand Prior in Rome of the Sovereign Military Order of Malta, June 1568.

He was charged with the important post of Camerlengo on 3 December 1568, a post he held until 10 May 1570. In recompense, he was given the sinecure of Abbot commendatario of San Michele della Chiusa.

As papal Rome was expanding, he took the initiative of developing a new quarter erected above the ancient imperial fora, laying out streets —of which via Alessandrina commemorates his title— which had come to be divided among the monasteries of S.Basilio, S.Adriano and SS.Cosma e Damiano, and planted in orchards.

His family shared in the honours during the pontificate of Pius V: his brother Girolamo, commander of the Papal Guard, was made marchese di Cassano d’Adda (1572), and his brother Michele, having been made duca di Salci (1569), became a gentleman-in-waiting to the duke of Savoy (1573).

The "Cardinale Alessandrino", as he was styled—a title that had been borne by Pius V as a cardinal— was sent as legate a latere to the kings of Spain and Portugal on 18 June 1571, with the honour of cardinal nipote, in the company of Francesco Borgia, and was sent as legate with the same discretionary powers a latere to the king of France on 16 November 1571. The question of his advance notice of the imminent Saint Bartholomew's Day Massacre beginning the following 24 August has been discussed among historians and emphatically denied in the Catholic Encyclopedia .

Cardinal Alessandrino administered the last rites to his great-uncle, the pope, in May 1572 and participated in the ensuing conclave. Member of the Congregation of the Index Librorum Prohibitorum, 1572, of the Council, 1573.

Boinelli played a role in the transformation of the studium of the Dominican Order at Santa Maria sopra Minerva in Rome into the College of St. Thomas, the forerunner of the Pontifical University of Saint Thomas Aquinas, Angelicum. Named by Pope Gregory XIII, prefect of the Congregation of Religious. He participated in the conclave of 1585 that elected Pope Sixtus V, who named him his vicar general in Rome and the entire Papal States. He participated in the two conclaves of 1590 and in the conclaves of 1591 and of 1592. Prefect of the new Congregation for the Examination of Bishops in the pontificate of Clement VIII. He supported the reconciliation of Pope Clement VIII with Henri IV in 1594.

He was made the first Count of Bosco Marengo on 29 November 1597. He died in Rome the following year after a brief illness, and was buried in his Dominican church of Santa Maria sopra Minerva, where his tomb sculpture of Prudence is by Stefano Maderno.

== Episcopal succession ==
Episcopal succession of Michele Bonelli

While bishop, he was the principal consecrator of:

- Paolo Sanvitale, Bishop of Spoleto (1591);
- Marcello Crescenzi (bishop), Bishop of Assisi (1591)
- Vincenzo Bugiatti da Montesanto, Bishop of Teramo (1592);
- Tommaso Calvi, Bishop of Tropea (1593);
- Guglielmo Bastoni, Bishop of Pavia (1593); and
- Alessandro de Franceschi, Bishop of Forlì (1594).
