= Giovanni Piccolomini =

Italian cardinal

His Eminence Giovanni Piccolomini
- Dean of the College of Cardinals
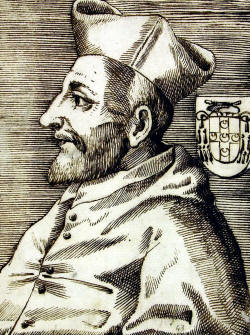
- Church: Roman Catholic Church
- Appointed: 26 February 1535
- Term ended: 21 November 1537
- Predecessor: Alessandro Farnese
- Successor: Giovanni Domenico de Cupis
- Other post(s): Apostolic Administrator of L'Aquila (1532-37); Cardinal-Bishop of Ostia-Velletri (1535-37)
- Previous post(s): Archbishop of Siena (1503-29); Commendatory Abbot of San Galgano (1516-22); Cardinal-Priest of Santa Sabina (1517-21); Cardinal-Priest of Santa Balbina (1521-24); Apostolic Administrator of L'Aquila (1523-25); Cardinal-Bishop of Albano (1524-31); Apostolic Administrator of Umbriatico (1524-31); Cardinal-Bishop of Palestrina (1531-33); Cardinal-Bishop of Porto e Santa Rufina (1533-35); Vice-Dean of the College of Cardinals (1533-35)

Orders
- Created cardinal: 1 July 1517 by Pope Leo X
- Rank: Cardinal-Priest (1517-24); Cardinal-Bishop (1524-37)

Personal details
- Born: Giovanni Piccolomini; 9 October 1475; Siena, Republic of Siena
- Died: 21 November 1537 (aged 62); Siena, Republic of Siena
- Buried: Siena Cathedral
- Parents: Andrea Todeschini Piccolomini; Agnese Farnese
- Coat of arms

Giovanni Piccolomini (1475–1537) was an Italian papal legate and cardinal. He was a nephew of Pope Pius III.

He was made Archbishop of Siena in 1503, Bishop of Sitten in 1522, Bishop of Aquila in 1523, Bishop of Albano in 1524, Bishop of Palestrina in 1531, Bishop of Porto e Santa Rufina in 1533, Bishop of Ostia in 1535.

He was made Dean of the College of Cardinals in October 1534.

Catholic Church titles
Preceded by Francesco Piccolomini	Archbishop of Siena; 1503–1529	Succeeded by Francesco Bandini
Preceded by Matthäus Schiner	Bishop of Sitten; 1522-? (became titular)	Succeeded by ?
Preceded by Francesco Franchi	Bishop of Aquila; 1523–1525	Succeeded by Pompeo Colonna
Preceded by Lorenzo Pucci	Cardinal-Bishop of Albano; 1524–1531	Succeeded by Giovanni Domenico de Cupis
Preceded by Lorenzo Pucci	Cardinal-Bishop of Palestrina; 1531–1533	Succeeded by Andrea della Valle
Preceded by Antonia Maria Ciocchi del Monte	Cardinal-Bishop of Porto; 1533–1535	Succeeded by Giovanni Domenico de Cupis
Preceded by Alessandro Farnese	Cardinal-Bishop of Ostia; 1535–1537	Succeeded by Giovanni Domenico de Cupis
