= Roman Catholic Diocese of Treia =

Roman Catholic diocese in Treia, Italy

The Diocese of Treia (Latin: Dioecesis Triensis) was a Roman Catholic diocese located in the town of Treia in the province of Macerata in the central Marche (Italy). In 1920, it was united with the Diocese of San Severino-Marche to form the Diocese of San Severino-Treia.
