= Paolo de Cupis =

Roman Catholic bishop

Most Reverend Paolo de Cupis
- Bishop of Recanati
- Church: Catholic Church
- Diocese: Diocese of Recanati
- In office: 1548–1553
- Predecessor: Giovanni Domenico de Cupis
- Successor: Giovanni Domenico de Cupis
- Previous post: Bishop of Montepeloso (1546–1548)

Orders
- Consecration: 22 August 1546

Personal details
- Died: 1553 Recanati, Italy

Paolo de Cupis (died 1553) was a Roman Catholic prelate who served as Bishop of Recanati (1548–1553) and Bishop of Montepeloso (1546–1548).

== Biography ==
On 27 January 1546, Paolo de Cupis was appointed during the papacy of Pope Paul III as Bishop of Montepeloso. On 22 August 1546, he was consecrated bishop by Giovanni Giacomo Barba, Bishop of Teramo, with Giovanni Andrea Mercurio, Archbishop of Manfredonia, and Jérome Buccaurati, Bishop of Acci, serving as co-consecrators. On 25 February 1548, he was appointed during the papacy of Pope Paul III as Bishop of Recanati. He served as Bishop of Recanati until his death in 1553.

== External links and additional sources ==
- Cheney, David M. "Diocese of Montepeloso". Catholic-Hierarchy.org. (Chronology of Bishops) ^{[self-published]}
- Chow, Gabriel. "Diocese of Irsina (Italy)". GCatholic.org. (Chronology of Bishops) ^{[self-published]}

Catholic Church titles
Preceded by Giovanni Domenico de Cupis	Bishop of Montepeloso; 1546–1548	Succeeded by Ascanio Ferrari
Preceded by Giovanni Domenico de Cupis	Bishop of Recanati; 1548–1553	Succeeded by Giovanni Domenico de Cupis
