= Ascanio Ferrari =

Italian Roman Catholic prelate

Most Reverend Ascanio Ferrari
- Bishop of Montepeloso
- Church: Catholic Church
- Diocese: Diocese of Montepeloso
- In office: 1548–1550
- Predecessor: Paolo de Cupis
- Successor: Vincenzo Ferrari

Ascanio Ferrari was a Roman Catholic prelate who served as Bishop of Montepeloso (1548–1550).

== Biography ==
On 24 February 1548, Ascanio Ferrari was appointed during the papacy of Pope Paul III as Bishop of Montepeloso. He served as Bishop of Montepeloso until his resignation in 1550.

== Episcopal succession ==
While bishop, he was the principal co-consecrator of:

- Adriano Fuscone, Bishop of Aquino (1554);
- Gerolamo Melchiori, Bishop of Macerata (1554);
- Fabio Capelleto, Bishop of Lacedonia (1555); and
- Virgilio Rosario, Bishop of Ischia (1555).

== External links and additional sources ==
- Cheney, David M. "Diocese of Montepeloso". Catholic-Hierarchy.org. (Chronology of Bishops) ^{[self-published]}
- Chow, Gabriel. "Diocese of Irsina (Italy)". GCatholic.org. (Chronology of Bishops) ^{[self-published]}

Catholic Church titles
Preceded by Paolo de Cupis	Bishop of Montepeloso; 1548–1550	Succeeded by Vincenzo Ferrari
