= Francesco Cantucci =

Italian bishop

Most Reverend Francesco Cantucci
- Bishop of Loreto
- Church: Catholic Church
- Diocese: Diocese of Loreto
- Successor: Rutilio Benzoni

Orders
- Consecration: 30 Mar 1586 by Decio Azzolini (seniore)

Personal details
- Died: 26 November 1586 Loreto, Italy

Francesco Cantucci (died 26 Nov 1586) was a Roman Catholic prelate who served as Bishop of Loreto (1586).

== Biography ==
On 23 Mar 1586, Francesco Cantucci was appointed during the papacy of Pope Sixtus V as Bishop of Loreto. On 30 Mar 1586, he was consecrated bishop by Decio Azzolini (seniore), Bishop of Cervia. He served as Bishop of Loreto until his death on 26 Nov 1586.

== See also ==
- Catholic Church in Italy

== External links and additional sources ==
- Cheney, David M. "Diocese of Loreto". Catholic-Hierarchy.org. (for Chronology of Bishops) ^{[self-published]}
- Chow, Gabriel. "Territorial Prelature of Loreto (Italy)". GCatholic.org. (for Chronology of Bishops) ^{[self-published]}

Catholic Church titles
Preceded by	Bishop of Loreto; 1586	Succeeded by Rutilio Benzoni
