= Giovanni Domenico de Cupis =

Italian cardinal

- Cardinal-Bishop of Ostia (e Velletri)
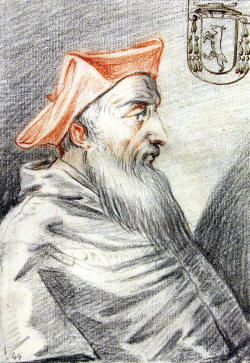
- Church: Catholic Church
- Diocese: Suburbicarian Diocese of Ostia (e Velletri)
- In office: 28 November 1537 – 10 December 1553
- Predecessor: Giovanni Piccolomini
- Successor: Gian Pietro Carafa
- Other posts: Administrator of Adria (1528-1553); Archpriest of the Archbasilica of Saint John Lateran (1535-1553)
- Previous posts: Cardinal-Priest of San Lorenzo in Lucina (1529-1553); Administrator of Recanati (1522-1548, 1552-1553); Administrator of Trani (1517-1551); Administrator of Camerino (1535-1537); Cardinal-Bishop of Porto e Santa Rufina (1535-1537); Administrator of Montepeloso (1532-1537); Bishop of Nardò (1532-1536); Administrator of Macerata (1528-1535); Cardinal-Bishop of Sabina (1532-1535); Cardinal-Bishop of Albano (1531-1532); Cardinal-Priest of Sant’Apollinare (1524-1529); Cardinal-Priest of San Giovanni a Porta Latina (1517-1529)

Orders
- Consecration: 21 December 1531 by Pope Clement VII
- Created cardinal: 1 July 1517 by Pope Leo X

Personal details
- Born: 1493 Rome, Papal States
- Died: 10 December 1553 (aged 59–60) Rome, Papal States

Giovanni Domenico de Cupis (Cupi, Cuppi) (1493–1553) was an Italian Cardinal, created by Pope Leo X in the consistory of 1 July 1517.

== Biography ==
He was Crown-cardinal of the Kingdom of Scotland. He was a friend of Ignatius Loyola.

His mother was Lucrezia Normanni, who had had a daughter Felice della Rovere by Pope Julius II before marrying Bernardino de Cupis, Giovanni Domenico's father. He owed early advancement as Bishop of Trani to Julius.

He was Bishop of Albano in 1531, Bishop of Sabina in 1532, Bishop of Porto e Santa Rufina in 1535 and Bishop of Ostia in 1537. Dean of the College of Cardinals in 1541.

== Notes ==
Catholic Church titles
Preceded by	Cardinal-Priest of San Giovanni a Porta Latina; 1517–1529	Succeeded by Mercurino Arborio di Gattinara
Preceded by Marco Vigerio della Rovere	Administrator of Trani; 1517–1551	Succeeded by Bartolommeo Serristori
Preceded by Luigi Tasso	Administrator of Recanati (1st time); 1522–1548	Succeeded by Paolo de Cupis
Preceded by Giovanni Battista Pallavicino	Cardinal-Priest of Sant'Apollinare; 1524–1529	Succeeded by Antonio Sanseverino
Preceded by Teseo de Cupis	Administrator of Macerata; 1528–1535	Succeeded by Giovanni Leclerc
Preceded by Giambattista Bragadin	Administrator of Adria; 1528–1553	Succeeded by Giulio Canani
Preceded by Silvio Passerini	Cardinal-Priest of San Lorenzo in Lucina; 1529-1553	Succeeded by Giovanni Gerolamo Morone
Preceded by Giovanni Piccolomini	Cardinal-bishop of Albano; 1531–1532	Succeeded by Andrea della Valle
Preceded by Pietro Accolti	Cardinal-bishop of Sabina; 1532–1535	Succeeded by Bonifacio Ferrero
Preceded by Giacomo Antonio Acquaviva	Bishop of Nardò; 1532–1536	Succeeded by Giovanni Battista Acquaviva
Preceded by Agostino Landolfi	Administrator of Montepeloso; 1532–1537	Succeeded by Paolo de Cupis
Preceded by Giovanni Piccolomini	Cardinal-Bishop of Porto e Santa Rufina; 1535–1537	Succeeded by Bonifacio Ferrero
Preceded by Anton Giacomo Bongiovanni	Administrator of Camerino; 1535–1537	Succeeded by Berardo Bongiovanni
Preceded by Giovanni Piccolomini	Cardinal-bishop of Ostia; 1537–1553	Succeeded by Giovanni Pietro Carafa
Preceded by Paolo de Cupis	Administrator of Recanati (2nd time); 1552–1553	Succeeded by Filippo Roccabella
