= Luigi Tasso =

Italian Roman Catholic prelate

Most Reverend Luigi Tasso
- Bishop of Recanati
- Church: Catholic Church
- Diocese: Diocese of Recanati
- In office: 1516–1520
- Predecessor: Teseo de Cupis
- Successor: Giovanni Domenico de Cupis
- Previous post: Bishop of Poreč (1500–1516)

Personal details
- Died: September 1520 Recanati, Italy

Luigi Tasso or Alvise Tasso (died 1520) was a Roman Catholic prelate who served as Bishop of Recanati (1516–1520) and Bishop of Poreč (Parenzo) (1500–1516).

== Biography ==
On 24 February 1500, Luigi Tasso was appointed during the papacy of Pope Alexander VI as Bishop of Poreč. On 16 January 1516, he was appointed during the papacy of Pope Leo X as Bishop of Recanati. He served as Bishop of Recanati until his death in September 1520.

== External links and additional sources ==
- Cheney, David M. "Diocese of Poreč i Pul". Catholic-Hierarchy.org. (for Chronology of Bishops) ^{[self-published]}
- Chow, Gabriel. "Diocese of Poreč i Pul (Croatia)". GCatholic.org. (for Chronology of Bishops) ^{[self-published]}
- Cheney, David M. "Diocese of Macerata–Tolentino–Recanati–Cingoli–Treia". Catholic-Hierarchy.org. (for Chronology of Bishops) ^{[self-published]}
- Chow, Gabriel. "Diocese of Macerata–Tolentino–Recanati–Cingoli–Treia (Italy)". GCatholic.org. (for Chronology of Bishops) ^{[self-published]}

Catholic Church titles
Preceded by Giovanni Antonio Pavaro	Bishop of Poreč; 1500–1516	Succeeded by Girolamo Campeggi
Preceded by Teseo de Cupis	Bishop of Recanati; 1516–1520	Succeeded by Giovanni Domenico de Cupis
