= Roman Catholic Diocese of San Severino =

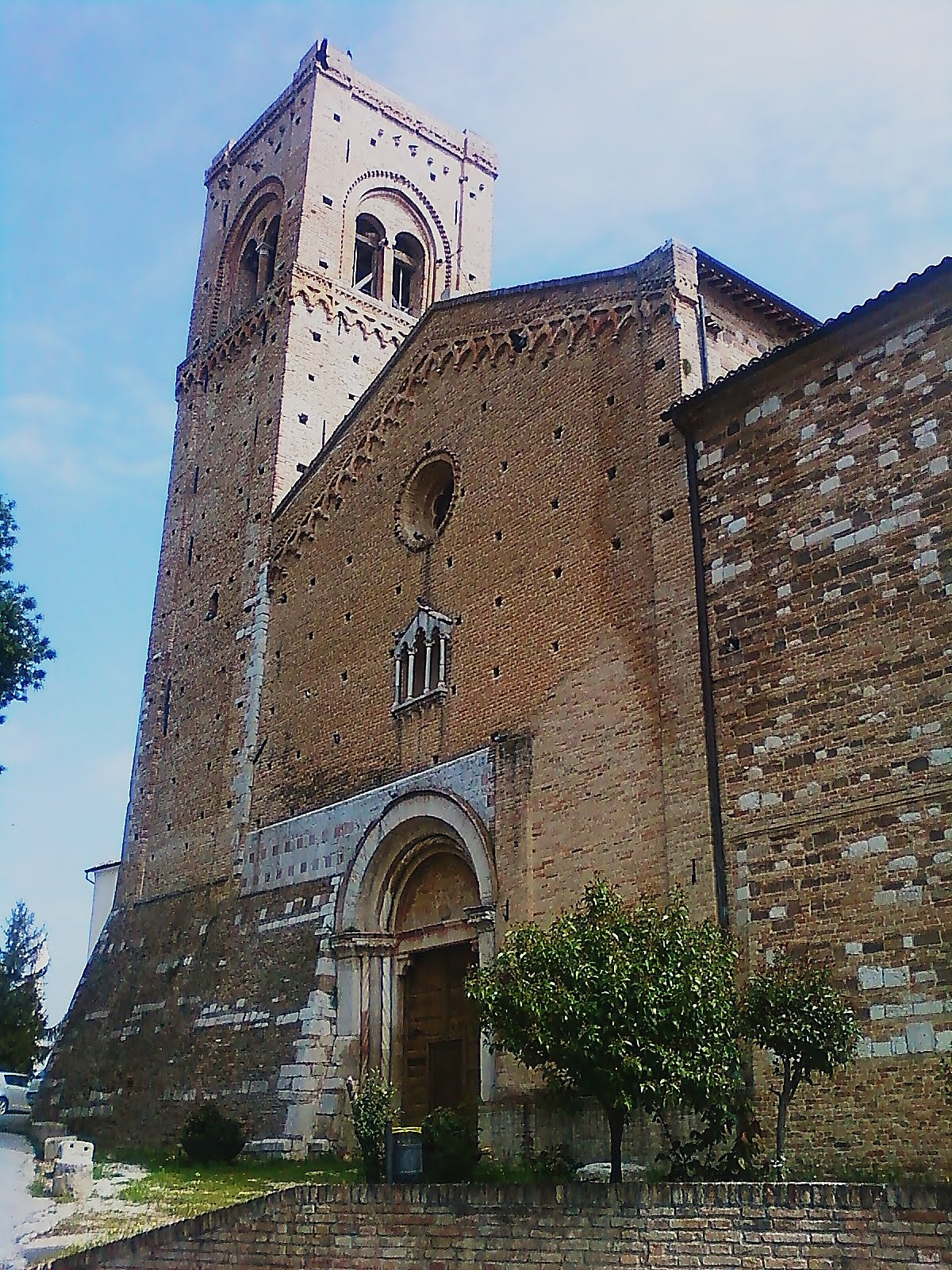
Old cathedral of S. Severino

The former Italian Catholic Diocese of San Severino, in the Province of Macerata, Marche in Central Italy, existed until 1986. In that year it was united into the Archdiocese of Camerino to form the Archdiocese of Camerino-San Severino Marche.

== History ==
San Severino stands on the site of the ancient Septempeda, a city of Picenum. The saint from whom the city takes its name is commonly believed to have been Bishop of Septempeda, but his date is unknown.

In the eighth century it was a fortress of the Duchy of Spoleto. The Church of San Severino gave its name later to a new town that grew up around it. In the twelfth and thirteenth centuries it was at constant war with the neighbouring cities, especially with Camerino, and always supported the cause of the emperors, particularly of Emperor Frederick II. Louis the Bavarian named as vicar of San Severino Smeduccio della Scala, who, passing into the service of the Holy See, gave great help to the expedition of Cardinal Albornoz and became feudal lord of San Severino, a post held later by his son Onofrio.

His nephew Antonio paid with his life for attempting to resist the arms of Pietro Colonna, the representative of Pope Martin V; his sons tried in vain to recapture the city (1434), which remained immediately subject to the Holy See.

In the Middle Ages San Severino was part of the Archdiocese of Camerino; the old cathedral was then a collegiate church. In 1566 there was a seminary in the town.

=== Creation of diocese ===
On 26 November 1586, by the Bull Superna dispositione, Pope Sixtus V made San Severino an episcopal see, a suffragan of the Archbishop of Fermo. The first bishop was Orazio Marzari. The cathedral was administered by a Chapter, with two dignities (the Archdeacon and the Archpriest) and thirteen Canons, one of whom was Theologus and another Penitentiary. A fourteenth was later added, under the patronage of the Tucci and Gentili families.

In 1913, the diocese of Treia was removed from the supervision of the Archbishop of Camerino and assigned donec aliter provideretur, to Bishop Adam Borghini of San. Severino. On 20 February 1920, the Diocese of Treia was united to the diocese of San Severino by the Bull Boni Pastoris of Pope Benedict XV, in such a way that the bishop of San Severino was to be the Apostolic Administrator of the diocese of Treia on a permanent basis.

Bishop Dionigi Pieragostini (1732–1745) held a diocesan synod in 1733.

=== End of diocese ===
The current configuration of the former diocese was arranged in order to conform to Italian civil law, which was embodied in the Concordat between the Vatican and the Italian Republic of 18 February 1984. After extensive consultations, Pope John Paul II decreed that the status of the bishop governing several dioceses aeque personaliter was abolished, and that the Diocese of Macerata-Tolentino was merged with the Diocese of Osimo e Cingoli, the Diocese of Recanati and the diocese of Treia to form a single diocese, albeit with a long name. The changes were embodied in a decree of the Sacred Congregation of Bishops in the Roman Curia, promulgated on 30 September 1986. The seat of the merged dioceses was to be in Macerata. All of the cathedrals except Macerata were to have the status of co-cathedral. On the same day the diocese of San Severino was united permanently with the Archiocese of Camerino, under the new title Archidioecesis Camerinensis-Sancti Severini in Piceno. The former cathedral of San Severino was granted the honorary title of co-cathedral.

== Bishops ==
=== Diocese of San Severino (Marche) ===
Erected: 26 November 1586

- Orazio Marzani (1586–1607)
- Ascanio Sperelli (1607–1631)
- Francesco Sperelli (22 Jul 1631 – 1646 Died)
- Angelo Maldachini, O.P. (19 Nov 1646 – 22 Jun 1677 Died)
- Scipione Negrelli (13 Sep 1677 – 11 May 1702 Died)
- Alessandro Avio (2 Oct 1702 – 15 Sep 1703 Died)
- Alessandro Calvi-Organi (2 Mar 1705 – 25 Jul 1721 Died)
- Giovanni Francesco Leonini (24 Sep 1721 – 16 Jan 1725 Died)
- Giulio Cesare Compagnoni (21 Feb 1725 – 12 Apr 1732 Died)
- Dionigi Pieragostini (7 May 1732 – 8 Dec 1745 Died)
- Giuseppe de Vignoli (14 Jun 1746 – 19 Dec 1757)
- Francesco Maria Forlani (19 Dec 1757 – 5 Jun 1765)
- Domenico Giovanni Prosperi (27 Jan 1766 – 1 Dec 1791 Died)
- Angelo Antonio Anselmi (26 Mar 1792 – Jan 1816 Died)
- Giacomo Ranghiasci (22 Jul 1816 – 13 May 1838 Died)
- Filippo Saverio Grimaldi (13 Sep 1838 – 1 Dec 1846 Resigned)
- Francesco Mazzuoli (4 Oct 1847 – 11 Feb 1889 Resigned)
- Aurelio Zonghi (1889–1893)
- Giosuè Bicchi (1893–1913)
- Adamo Borghini (1913–1926)

=== Diocese of San Severino (-Treia) ===
United: 20 February 1920 with Diocese of Treia

- Vincenzo Migliorelli (10 Aug 1927 – 27 Feb 1930 Resigned)
- Pietro Tagliapietra (22 Feb 1932 – 12 Sep 1934 Appointed, Archbishop of Spoleto)
- Ferdinando Longinotti (22 Oct 1934 – 5 Oct 1966 Retired)

United: 30 September 1986 with the Archdiocese of Camerino to form the Archdiocese of Camerino-San Severino Marche

== See also ==
- Roman Catholic Diocese of Treia
- Roman Catholic Diocese of Macerata-Tolentino-Recanati-Cingoli-Treia
- Roman Catholic Archdiocese of Camerino-San Severino Marche

== Bibliography ==
=== Reference works for bishops ===
- Gams, Pius Bonifatius (1873). Series episcoporum Ecclesiae catholicae: quotquot innotuerunt a beato Petro apostolo (in Latin). Ratisbon: Typis et Sumptibus Georgii Josephi Manz. pp. 723–724.
- Gulik, Guilelmus (1923). Eubel, Conradus (ed.). Hierarchia catholica (in Latin). Vol. Tomus 3 (second ed.). Münster: Libreria Regensbergiana.
- Gauchat, Patritius (Patrice) (1935). Hierarchia catholica. Vol. Tomus IV (1592-1667). Münster: Libraria Regensbergiana.
- Ritzler, Remigius; Sefrin, Pirminus (1952). Hierarchia catholica medii et recentis aevi. Vol. Tomus V (1667-1730). Patavii: Messagero di S. Antonio.
- Ritzler, Remigius; Sefrin, Pirminus (1958). Hierarchia catholica medii et recentis aevi. Vol. Tomus VI (1730-1799). Patavii: Messagero di S. Antonio.
- Ritzler, Remigius; Sefrin, Pirminus (1968). Hierarchia Catholica medii et recentioris aevi (in Latin). Vol. VII (1800–1846). Monasterii: Libreria Regensburgiana.
- Remigius Ritzler; Pirminus Sefrin (1978). Hierarchia catholica Medii et recentioris aevi (in Latin). Vol. VIII (1846–1903). Il Messaggero di S. Antonio.
- Pięta, Zenon (2002). Hierarchia catholica medii et recentioris aevi (in Latin). Vol. IX (1903–1922). Padua: Messagero di San Antonio. ISBN 978-88-250-1000-8.

=== Studies ===
- Cappelletti, Giuseppe (1845). Le chiese d'Italia (in Italian). Vol. terzo. Venice: G. Antonelli. pp. 729–750.
- Collio, Severino Servanzi (1875). Serie dei vescovi di Sanseverino nella Marca (in Italian). Camerino: tipografia di G. Borgarelli. p. 13.
- Gentili, Giovanni Carlo (1838). De ecclesia Septempedana libri III (in Latin). Macerata: A. Mancini.
- Ughelli, Ferdinando; Coleti, Niccolò (1717). Italia sacra, sive De Episcopis Italiae, et insularum adjacentium (in Latin). Vol. Tomus secundus. Venice: apud Sebastianum Coleti. pp. 764–770.

Acknowledgment
