= Roman Catholic Diocese of Loreto =

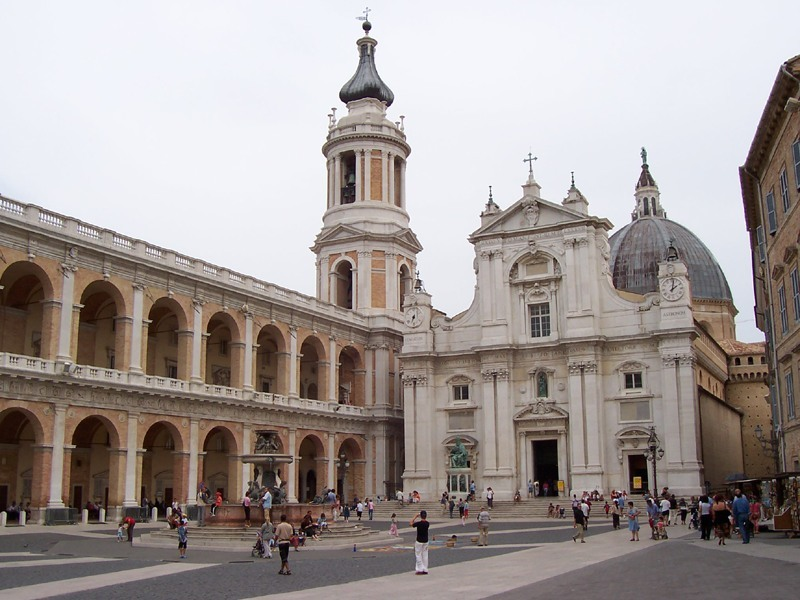
The sanctuary at Loreto

The Diocese of Loreto was a Roman Catholic diocese with see in Loreto, Italy.

== History ==
The diocese was established by Pope Sixtus V in the Bull Pro excellenti of 17 March 1586. It was merged with the Diocese of Recanati to form the Diocese of Recanati e Loreto in either 1591 or 1592.

== Bishops ==
=== Diocese of Loreto ===
Erected: 17 March 1586
Latin Name: Dioecesis ab Alma Domo Lauretana

- Francesco Cantucci (23 Mar 1586 - 26 Nov 1586 Died)
- Rutilio Benzoni (16 Dec 1586 - 9 Feb 1592 Appointed, Bishop of Recanati e Loreto)

9 February 1592: United with the Diocese of Recanati to form the Diocese of Recanati e Loreto

== See also ==
- Roman Catholic Diocese of Recanati

== Bibliography ==
- Gulik, Guilelmus (1923). Eubel, Conradus (ed.). Hierarchia catholica (in Latin). Vol. Tomus 3 (second ed.). Münster: Libreria Regensbergiana. p. 220.
- Leopardi, Monaldo (1828). Serie dei vescovi di Recanati (in Italian). Recanati: Presso Giuseppe Morici. pp. 198-204.
