= Diocese of Recanati =

Titular see in Italy

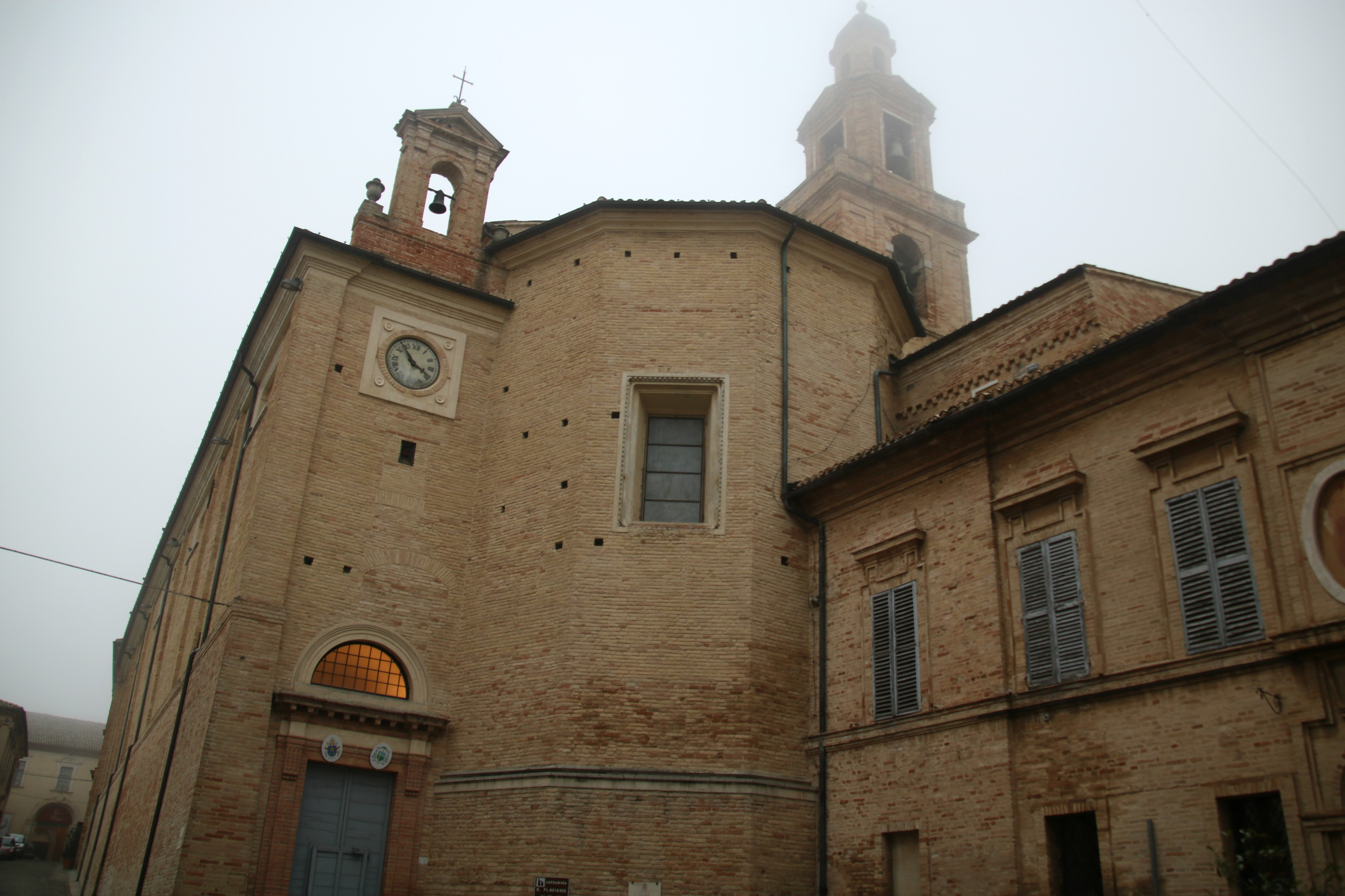
Concattedrale di S. Flaviano

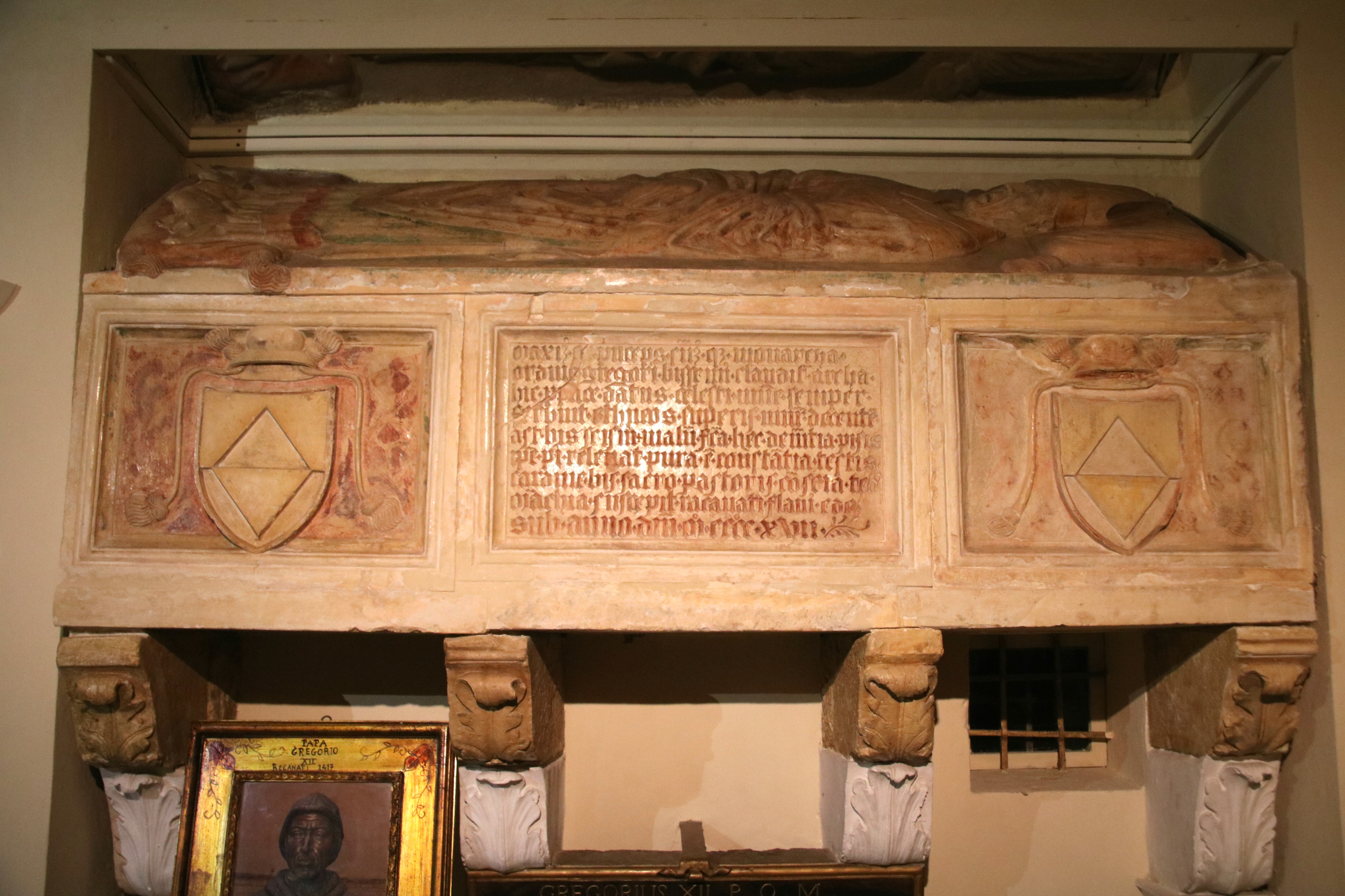
Tomb of Pope Gregory XII, S. Flaviano

The Diocese of Recanati was a Roman Catholic diocese in Italy. It was founded in 1240 by Pope Gregory IX.

Its principal church, S. Flaviano, was raised to the dignity of a cathedral on 21 December 1239, and separated from the jurisdiction of the diocese of Osimo. The diocese of Osimo was suppressed, having chosen to support the Emperor Frederick II against the pope. On 22 May 1240, the Castello di Recanati was raised to the dignity of a city by Gregory IX.

During its early history it often lost and regained its episcopal status due to papal politics. On 27 July 1263 the diocese was completely suppressed by Pope Urban IV in the Bull Cives Recanatensis, due to its support of Manfred, who claimed the Kingdom of Sicily.

It survives as a titular see.

== History ==
Pope Sixtus V was greatly devoted to the cult of the Virgin Mary and the Holy House of Loreto, purported to be the house in Nazareth in which the Virgin Mary was born or lived, and which was transported by angels to Tersatto, Croatia, in 1291. Loreto was an ecclesiastical territory belonging to no diocese and directly subject to the Holy See. Pope Sixtus conceived of a plan to honor the Virgin by exalting the town where her shrine was located. On 17 March 1586, he decreed, in the Bull Pro excellenti, that the town (oppidum) of Loreto should be raised to the status of a city (civitas), and that the city should become the center of a diocese, with its seat at the Basilica of the Virgin Mary. To provide territory to support the apparatus of a diocese, the already existing diocese of Recanati was suppressed, and its territory was transferred to the new diocese of Loreto. The cathedral of Recanati was demoted to the status of collegiate church. Bishop Galeazzo Moroni, the Bishop of Macerata who was also Bishop of Recanati, was released from his connection to the diocese of Recanati.

Sixtus went even further. He wanted Loreto to enjoy the prestige of being a festival city. He had already, on 7 July 1590, ordered the Auditor of the Rota for Macerata to police and restrict the festivals associated with the grain harvest and the wine harvest. He also he intended to transfer the annual fair of Recanati to Loreto. The bull was ordered, but Sixtus died before it could be finished or executed. Recanati sent ambassadors to his successor, Pope Urban VII, to congratulate him and to complain about Sixtus' injustices, but the new pope died after only thirty days in office. The next pope, Gregory XIV was favorable to the idea of the restoration of the diocese of Recanati, but reversing the actions of a previous pope required subtlety and preparation. He therefore appointed a commission of cardinals, which agreed to reverse the acts of Sixtus V almost completely. The Administrator of Loreto, however, intrigued and eventually got Gregory XIV to appoint a second commission, which was agreed to restore the bishopric of Recanate, but not its territory. In the meantime, Pope Gregory died on 15 October 1591. The next pope, Innocent IX, immediately proposed in Consistory the restoration of the diocese of Recanati, and on 19 December 1591 issued the decree. But Innocent died on 29 December 1591, and the bull remained unsigned. Pope Innocent VIII was elected on 30 January 1592, and on 9 February he issued the bull which restored the diocese of Recanati and united to it the diocese of Loreto, to form the Diocese of Recanati-Loreto.

In implementing the Lateran Pact of 1929, it was necessary that the Holy See (Papacy) make extensive changes in the status of the diocese and sanctuary of Loreto. The Holy Shrine was to be placed under the direction of the Holy See, but that presented a problem, since the Basilica was the seat of the bishop of Recanati e Loreto; the seat had to be removed. Pope Pius XI, therefore, in the Bull Laurentanae Basilicae of 15 September 1934, suppressed the diocese of Loreto and removed the seat of a bishop from the basilica. The relationship of the bishop between his dioceses of Recanati and Loreto aeque personaliter was dissolved, and the diocese of Loreto was incorporated into the diocese of Recanati. The current bishop of Recanati, Aluigi Cossio, was to be called the bishop of Recanati-Loreto, for the time being.

On 11 October 1935, the Roman Curia's Consistorial Congregation published a decree, stating that Pope Pius XI had ordered that the jurisdiction of the Administrator of the Pontifical Basilica of Loreto should extend to the city of Loreto and the surrounding district, in which the jurisdiction of the bishop of Recanati-Loreto was to be suspended as long as papal administration applied. The bishop of Recanati thus lost part of his diocesan territory, and Loreto's obligation to contribute to the bishop's income was terminated.

On 30 September 1986 it merged with the Diocese of Macerata-Tolentino, the Diocese of Osimo e Cingoli and the Diocese of San Severino to form the Diocese of Macerata-Tolentino-Recanati-Cingoli-Treia, abolishing the status aequaliter principaliter, resulting in there being one diocese and one bishop. On December 17, 2022, the Holy See reestablished Recanati as a Titular See, and Bishop Diego Giovanni Ravelli was appointed as Titular Archbishop of that see.

=== Chapter and cathedral ===
The bull which created the cathedral of S. Flaviano in Recanati did not mention the new cathedral Chapter. In a document of 10 September 1256, however, appear the signatures of Paolo di Tedelgardo, Prior of the Chapter, and ten Canons. In an act of 14 April 1290 appear the signatures of Archdeacon Corrado and sixteen Canons. When the diocese was restored and made part of the Diocese of Macerata e Recanati in 1356, the Cathedral of Macerata had an Archdeacon and eight Canons, while the co-cathedral in Recanati had a Provost and eight Canons. The Provost of Recanati was also Archpriest of the cathedral. In the mid-fifteenth century the Chapter of Recanati was again headed by an Archdeacon, but in 1467 the archdeaconate was suppressed, and the principal dignity of the Chapter was again the Provost. The archdeaconate was restored in 1518, by Bishop Luigi Tasso (1516–1520), who also issued new regulations for Canons and Altaristi. When the seat of the bishop was in Macerata, the services in the Cathedral of S. Flaviano in Recanati were maintained by the College of Mansionarii (Altaristi), fourteen in number

In 1682, the Chapter of Recanati had four dignities (Provost, Archdeacon, Archpriest, Dean) and twelve Canons, while the Chapter of Loreto had four dignities and seventeen Canons. In 1746, the Chapter of Recanati had four dignities and eighteen Canons, while the Chapter of Loreto had four dignities and twenty Canons.

There had also been a College of Canons at the church of S. Vitus, but in 1461 the Canons were assimilated to the cathedral Chapter. Their Cantor, however, did not become one of the Canons.

=== Synods ===
A diocesan synod was an irregularly held, but important, meeting of the bishop of a diocese and his clergy. Its purpose was (1) to proclaim generally the various decrees already issued by the bishop; (2) to discuss and ratify measures on which the bishop chose to consult with his clergy; (3) to publish statutes and decrees of the diocesan synod, of the provincial synod, and of the Holy See.

Bishop Rutilio Benzoni (1592–1613) held a diocesan synod in Loreto on 21 September 1588, after having made a general pastoral Visitation of the entire diocese. He held a second synod on 24 November 1592. Benzoni held a synod at Recanati on 24 November 1609, in which he appointed a committee to revise the calendar of saints' days for the diocese; the calendar was published in 1611. Cardinal Agostino Galamini (1613–1620) held a diocesan synod for Recanati on 14 November 1614, and for Loreto on 23 November. Cardinal Giulio Roma (1621–1634) held a synod at Recanati on 29 January 1623; in accordance with the decrees of the Council of Trent, the offices of Theologus and Penitentarius were established in the cathedral Chapter. He held another synod on 15 November 1632, and again on 18 April 1633. He presided over a synod at Loreto on 8 January 1626, regulating clerical discipline and the operation of the Choir of the Basilica.

Bishop Ciriaco Vecchioni (1767–1787) presided over a diocesan synod at Recanati on 29 April—1 May 1781, and had their constitutions published in 1782.

== Bishops ==
=== Diocese of Recanati ===
Latin Name: Recinetensis
Erected: 1240

- Rainerius (1241–1244?)
- Petrus Georgii (1244–1249?)
- Matthaeus (attested 1249)
- Bonajuncta, O.Min. (1256?–1263)

Diocese of Recanati suppressed (1263–1289)

- Salvus, O.P. (1289–1300)
- Fridericus (1301–1320)

Diocese of Recanati suppressed (1320–1356)

=== Diocese of Recanati e Macerata ===
- Nicolò da San Martino, O.P. (1356–1369)
- Oliviero (1369–1374)
- Giovanni di Bartolomeo (1374–1383)
- Paolo (19 September 1382 - ?) (Avignon Obedience)
- Niccolò Vanni (1383 - ?) (Roman Obedience)
- Angelo Cino (20 July 1385 - 9 September 1409 deposed)(Roman Obedience)
- Angelo Baglioni (9 September 1409 - 1412) (Pisan Obedience)
- Nicolaus, O.E.S.A. (1412–1418) (Pisan Obedience)
- Marinus de Tocco (1418–1428)
- Benedetto Guidalotti (1429)
- Giovanni Vitelleschi (1431–1435)
- Thomas Tomasini, O.P. (1435–1440)
- Nicolaus d' Asti (1440–1460)
- Petrus Giorgii (1460–1469)

Francesco Morosini (1470–1471) Administrator

- Andreas de Pilis (1471–1476)
- Gerolamo della Rovere (1476–1507)
- Teseo de Cupis (1507–1516 Resigned)
- Luigi Tasso (1516–1520 Died)
- Cardinal Giovanni Domenico de Cupis (1522–1548 Resigned) Administrator
- Paolo de Cupis (1548–1553 Died)
- Cardinal Giovanni Domenico de Cupis (1553 Resigned) Administrator
- Filippo Roccabella (1553–1571 Died)
- Gerolamo Melchiori (1571–1573 Resigned)
- Galeazzo Moroni (1573–1586)

The diocese of Recanati was suppressed on 17 March 1586.

=== Diocese of Recanati e Loreto ===
Latin Name: Recinetensis et ab Alma Domo Lauretana
9 February 1592: Diocese of Recanati restored and united with the Diocese of Loreto

- Rutilio Benzoni (1592–1613 Died)
- Cardinal Agostino Galamini, O.P. (1613–1620)
- Cardinal Giulio Roma (1621–1634)
- Amico Panici (1634–1661?)

Sede vacante (1661–1666)

- Giacinto Cordella (1666–1675 Died)
- Cardinal Alessandro Crescenzi, C.R.S. (1676–1682 Resigned)
- Guarnerio Guarnieri (1682–1689 Died)
- Raimondo Ferretti (1690–1692)
- Lorenzo Gherardi (1693–1727 Died)
- Benedetto Bussi (1727–1728 Died)
- Vincenzo Antonio Maria Muscettola (1728–1746 Died)
- Giovanni Battista Campagnoli (1746–1749 Died)
- Giovanni Antonio Bacchetoni (1749–1767 Died)
- Ciriaco Vecchioni (1767–1787 Died)

Sede Vacante (1787–1800)

Domenico Spinucci (1787–1796) Administrator
Settimio Mazzagalli, Vicar Capitular

- Felice Paoli (1800–1806 Died)
- Stefano Bellini (1807–1831 Died)
- Alessandro Bernetti (1831– 1846 Died)
- Francesco Brigante Colonna (1846–1855 Died)
- Giovanni Francesco Magnani (1855–1861 Died)
- Giuseppe Cardoni (1863–1867 Resigned)
- Tommaso Gallucci (1867–1897 Died)
- Guglielmo Giustini (1898–1903 Died)
- Vittorio Amedeo Ranuzzi de' Bianchi (1903–1911 Resigned)
- Alfonso Andreoli (1911–1923 Died)
- Aluigi Cossio (1923–1955 Retired)

=== Diocese of Recanati ===
Diocese of Loreto suppressed: 15 September 1934
Immediately Subject to the Holy See

- Emilio Baroncelli (1955–1968 Retired)

Sede vacante (1968–1976)

- Francesco Tarcisio Carboni (1976–1985)

25 January 1985: United with the Diocese of Macerata e Tolentino, the Diocese of Osimo e Cingoli, and the Diocese of San Severino-Treia to form the Diocese of Macerata-Tolentino-Recanati-Cingoli-Treia

== See also ==
- Roman Catholic Diocese of Macerata-Tolentino-Recanati-Cingoli-Treia

== Bibliography ==
=== Reference works for bishops ===
- Gams, Pius Bonifatius (1873). Series episcoporum Ecclesiae catholicae: quotquot innotuerunt a beato Petro apostolo (in Latin). Ratisbon: Typis et Sumptibus Georgii Josephi Manz. pp. 703, 719.
- Eubel, Conradus, ed. (1913). Hierarchia catholica (in Latin). Vol. Tomus 1 (second ed.). Münster: Libreria Regensbergiana. (in Latin)
- Eubel, Conradus, ed. (1914). Hierarchia catholica (in Latin). Vol. Tomus 2 (second ed.). Münster: Libreria Regensbergiana.
- Eubel, Conradus; Gulik, Guilelmus (1923). Hierarchia catholica (in Latin). Vol. Tomus 3 (second ed.). Münster: Libreria Regensbergiana.
- Gauchat, Patritius (Patrice) (1935). Hierarchia catholica. Vol. Tomus IV (1592-1667). Münster: Libraria Regensbergiana.
- Ritzler, Remigius; Sefrin, Pirminus (1952). Hierarchia catholica medii et recentis aevi. Vol. Tomus V (1667-1730). Patavii: Messagero di S. Antonio.
- Ritzler, Remigius; Sefrin, Pirminus (1958). Hierarchia catholica medii et recentis aevi. Vol. Tomus VI (1730-1799). Patavii: Messagero di S. Antonio.
- Ritzler, Remigius; Sefrin, Pirminus (1968). Hierarchia Catholica medii et recentioris aevi (in Latin). Vol. VII (1800–1846). Monasterii: Libreria Regensburgiana.
- Remigius Ritzler; Pirminus Sefrin (1978). Hierarchia catholica Medii et recentioris aevi (in Latin). Vol. VIII (1846–1903). Il Messaggero di S. Antonio.
- Pięta, Zenon (2002). Hierarchia catholica medii et recentioris aevi (in Latin). Vol. IX (1903–1922). Padua: Messagero di San Antonio. ISBN 978-88-250-1000-8.

=== Studies ===
- Cappelletti, Giuseppe (1848). Le chiese d'Italia della loro origine sino ai nostri giorni (in Italian). Vol. settimo. Venezia: G. Antonelli. pp. 195–238.
- Leopardi, Monaldo (1828). Serie dei vescovi di Recanati (in Italian). Recanati: Presso Giuseppe Morici. p. 1.
- Ughelli, Ferdinando; Coleti, Niccolò (1717). Italia sacra, sive De Episcopis Italiae (in Latin). Vol. Tomus primus (secunda ed.). Venice: apud Sebastianum Coleti. pp. 1217–1225.
- Vogel, Josephus Antonius (1859). De Ecclesiis Recanatensi et Lauretana Earumque Episcopis (in Latin). Recanati: Leonardo Badaloni.
