= Roman Catholic Diocese of Osimo and Cingoli =

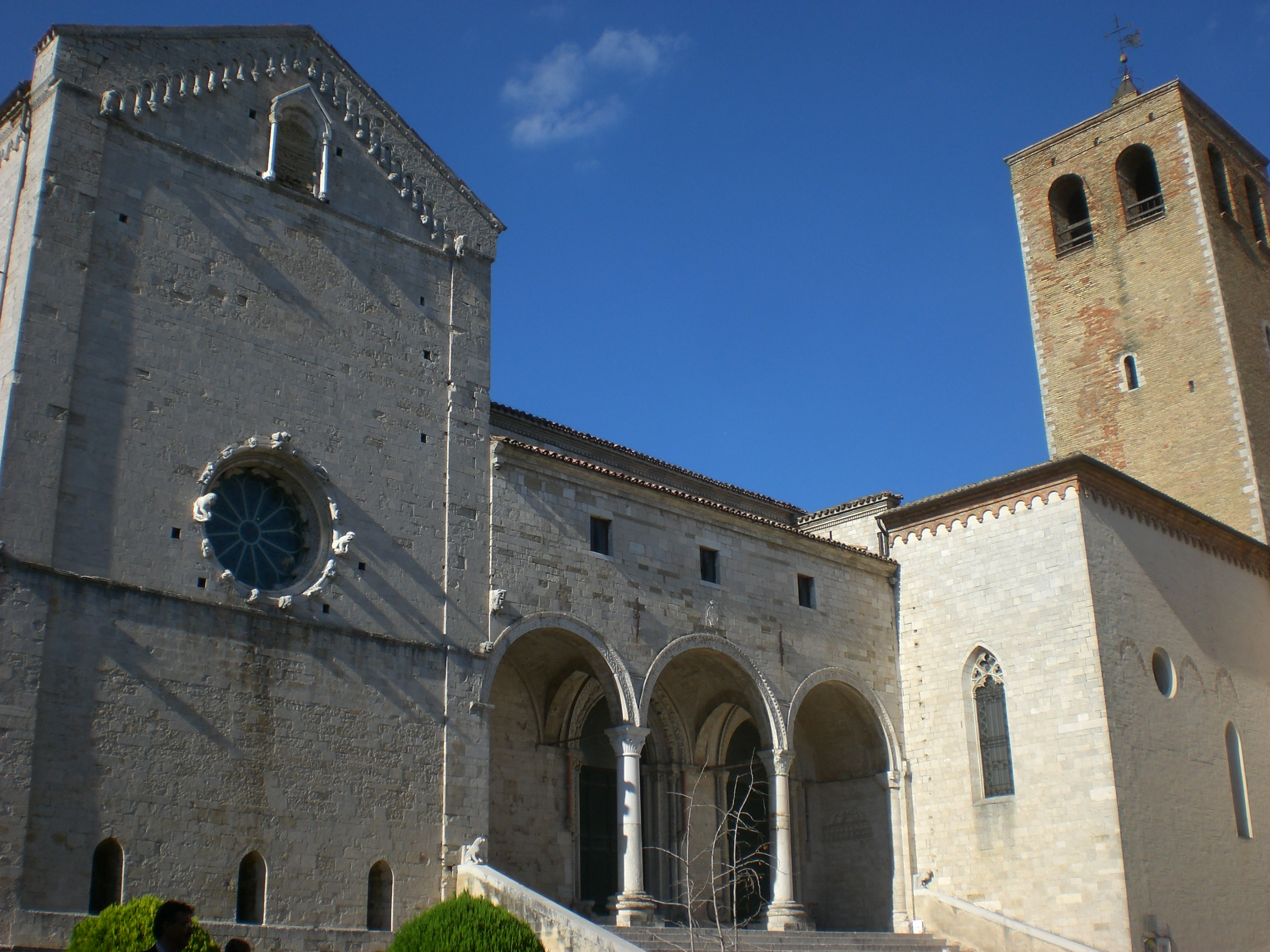
Osimo Cathedral

The Diocese of Osimo e Cingoli was a Roman Catholic diocese in Italy.

It was founded in 1725 from a merger of the Diocese of Osimo and the Diocese of Cingoli. In 1986 it merged with the Diocese of Macerata-Tolentino, the Diocese of Recanati and the Diocese of San Severino to form the Diocese of Macerata-Tolentino-Recanati-Cingoli-Treia.

It was contained within the Papal States.

== Bishops ==
=== Diocese of Osimo ===
Latin Name: Auximana
Erected: 7th Century

- Giambattista Sinibaldi, (1515–1547 Died)
- Cipriano Senili, (1547–1551 Died)
- Bernardino de Cupis (bishop), (1551–1574 Resigned)
- Cornelio Firmano, (1574–1588 Died)
- Teodosio Fiorenzi, (1588–1591 Died)
- Antonio Maria Gallo, (1591–1620 Died)
- Agostino Galamini, (1620–1639 Died)
- Girolamo Verospi, (1642–1652 Died)
- Lodovico Betti, (1652–1655 Died)
- Antonio Bichi, (1656–1691 Died)
- Opizio Pallavicini, (1691–1700 Died)
- Michelangelo dei Conti, (1709–1712 Appointed, Archbishop (Personal Title) of Viterbo e Tuscania)
- Orazio Filippo Spada, (1714–1724 Died)
- Agostino Pipia, (1724–1726 Resigned)

=== Diocese of Osimo e Cingoli ===
United: 19 August 1725 with the Diocese of Cingoli
Immediately Subject to the Holy See

- Pier Secondo Radicati de Cocconato, (1728–1729 Died)
- Ferdinando Agostino Bernabei, (1729–1734 Died)
- Giacomo Lanfredini, (1734–1740 Resigned)
- Pompeo Compagnoni, (1740–1774 Died)
- Guido Calcagnini, (1776–1807 Died)
- Giovanni Castiglione (cardinal, 1714–1815), (1808–1815 Died)
- Carlo Andrea Pelagallo, (1815–1822 Died)
- Ercole Dandini, (1823–1824 Resigned)
- Timoteo Maria Ascensi, (1827–1828 Died)
- Giovanni Antonio Benvenuti, (1828–1838 Died)
- Giovanni Soglia Ceroni, (1839–1856 Died)
- Giovanni Brunelli, (1856–1861 Died)
- Salvatore Nobili Vitelleschi, (1863–1871 Resigned)
- Michele Seri-Molini, (1871–1888 Died)
- Egidio Mauri, O.P., (1888–1893 Appointed, Archbishop of Ferrara)
- Giovanni Battista Scotti, (1894–5 Dec 1916 Died)
- Pacifico Fiorani, (1917–1924 Died)
- Monalduzio Leopardi, (1926–1944 Died)
- Domenico Brizi, (1945–1964 Died)

=== Diocese of Osimo ===
Latin Name: Auximana
25 January 1985: The former Diocese of Cingoli was split from the Diocese of Osimo e Cingoli and united with the Diocese of Macerata e Tolentino, the Diocese of Recanati, and the Diocese of San Severino (-Treia) to form the Diocese of Macerata-Tolentino-Recanati-Cingoli-Treia.

- Carlo Maccari, (1972–1986 Appointed, Archbishop of Ancona-Osimo)

United: 30 September 1986 with the Diocese of Ancona to form the Roman Catholic Archdiocese of Ancona-Osimo
