= Diocese of Cingoli =

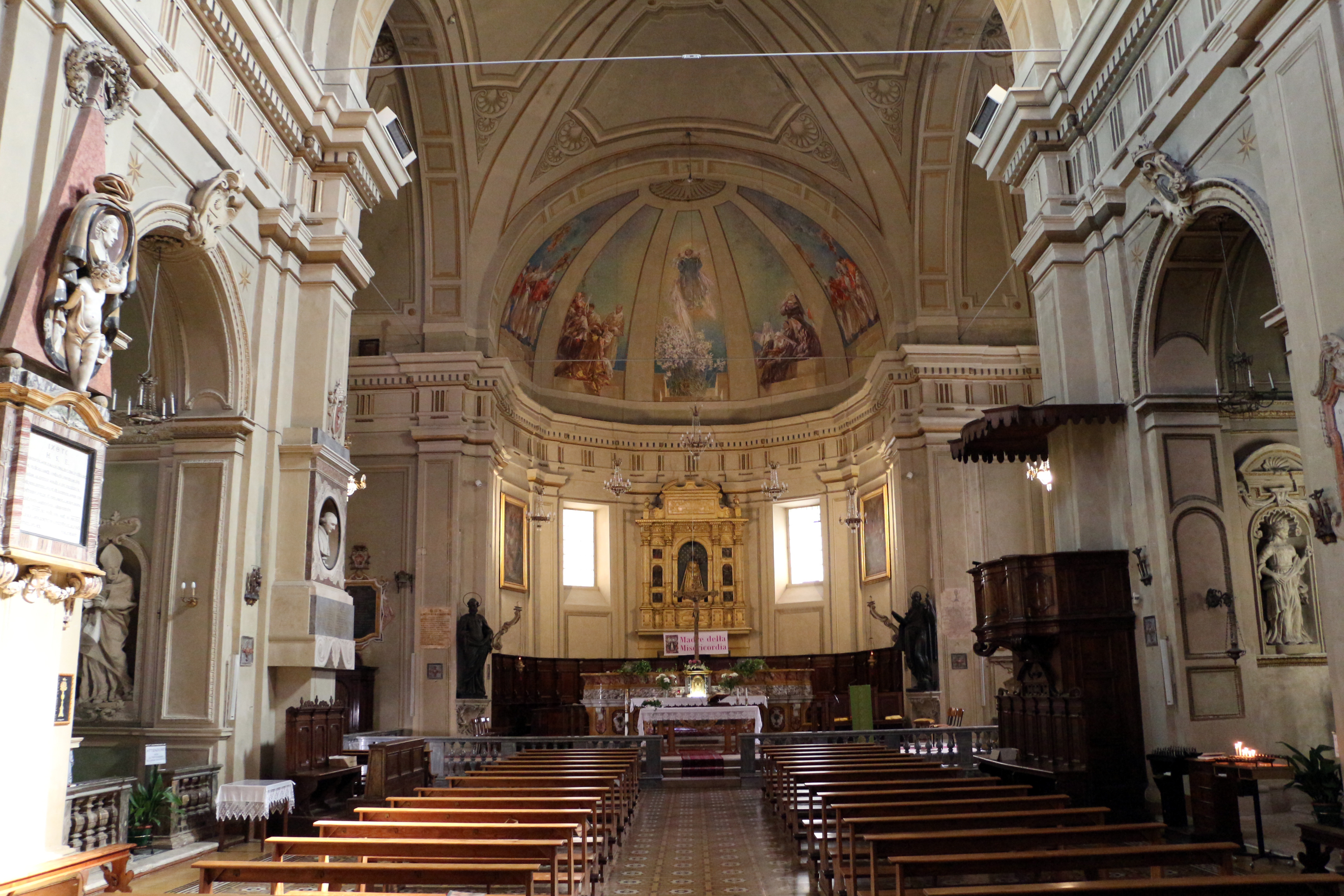
A cathedral in the Diocese of Cingoli

The Diocese of Cingoli was a Roman Catholic diocese in Italy. It was founded in the 5th century. Nothing is heard of the diocese or of its bishops after the sixth decade of the 6th century. The time and reason for its cease is speculative. It was contained within the Papal States. The diocese was always immediately subject to the Holy See (Papacy). The effort to revive the diocese of Cingoli was begun during the reign of Pope Innocent XIII, the initiative coming from the town of Cingoli itself. Having received their memorial, on 26 August 1721, the Pope requested from Cardinal Orazio Spada his comments on each of the items mentioned by the Public of Cingoli. Archbishop Giustino Fontanini prepared a memorial of the information relevant to making a decision; it was dated 20 May 1723. Unfortunately Pope Innocent died on 7 March 1724, before the bulls could be prepared. The matter was left to the new pope, Benedict XIII (Orsini). In 1725, by virtue of the Bull "Romana Ecclesia" of 19 August 1725, Pope Benedict XIII revived the diocese of Cingoli, and united it aeque principaliter with the Diocese of Osimo to form the Diocese of Osimo e Cingoli.

The united diocese of Osimo e Cingoli was without a bishop (Sede vacante) from 11 February 1964 to 28 September 1972. On 28 September 1972, Archbishop Carlo Maccari of Ancona and Numana was named Bishop of Osimo; no mention is made of Cingoli. Cingoli was governed by four successive Apostolic Administrators, appointed by the pope: Silvio Cassullo (1964–1968), Aurelio Sabattani (1968–1969), Ersilio Tonini (1969–1975), Vittorio Cecchi (1975–1976). Francesco Tarcisio Carboni (1976–1986) was appointed Bishop of Macerata e Tolentino, Recanati, Cingoli, e Troia on 11 February 1976. He died on 20 November 1995.

On 19 March 1984, upon the recommendation of the Episcopal Conference of the ecclesiastical province of Picenum, and by order of the Congregation of Bishops of the Roman Curia, the diocese of Cingoli was enlarged by the addition of five parishes which had belonged to the Archdiocese of Camerino.

The diocese of Macerata e Tolentino, Recanati, Cingoli, e Troia, in its current configuration was established in order to conform to Italian civil law which was embodied in the Concordat between the Vatican and the Italian Republic of 18 February 1984. After extensive consultations, Pope John Paul II decreed that the status of the bishop governing several dioceses aeque personaliter was abolished, and that the Diocese of Macerata-Tolentino was merged with the Diocese of Osimo e Cingoli, the Diocese of Recanati and the Diocese of San Severino (Treia) to form a single diocese, albeit with a long name. The changes were embodied in a decree of the Sacred Congregation of Bishops in the Roman Curia, promulgated on 30 September 1986. The seat of the merged dioceses was to be in Macerata. All of the cathedrals except Macerata were to have the status of co-cathedral. The diocesan offices (curia) was to be in Macerata, as was the diocesan tribunal, the diocesan seminary, the College of Consultors, the Priests' Council, unless otherwise directed by the bishop.

== Bishops ==
- Theodosius
- Exuperantius
- Formarius

...

- Iulianus

== See also ==
- Roman Catholic Diocese of Osimo and Cingoli
- Roman Catholic Diocese of Macerata-Tolentino-Recanati-Cingoli-Treia

== Bibliography ==
- Cappelletti, Giuseppe (1848). Le chiese d'Italia della loro origine sino ai nostri giorni (in Italian). Vol. settimo. Venezia: G. Antonelli. pp. 438–481.
- Compagnoni, Pompeo (1782). Memorie istorico-critiche della Chiesa e de'vescovi di Osimo (in Italian). Vol. Tomo I. Roma: Zempel.
- Gams, Pius Bonifatius (1873). Series episcoporum Ecclesiae catholicae: quotquot innotuerunt a beato Petro apostolo (in Latin). Ratisbon: Typis et Sumptibus Georgii Josephi Manz. pp. 712–713.
- Lanzoni, Francesco (1927). Le diocesi d'Italia dalle origini al principio del secolo VII (an. 604). Faenza: F. Lega, pp. 389–390. (in Italian)
- Rafaelle, Francesco Maria (1762). Delle Memorie Ecclesiastiche Intorno L'Istoria, Ed Il Culto Di Santo Esuperanzio Antico Vescovo, E Principal Protettore Di Cingoli: Appendice Di Documenti I Quali Riguardano, Ed Illustrano Le Memorie Di S. Esuperanzio Vescovo ... (in Italian and Latin). Pescara: Gavelliana.
- Ughelli, Ferdinando; Coleti, Niccolò (1717). Italia sacra, sive De Episcopis Italiae (in Latin). Vol. Tomus primus (secunda ed.). Venice: apud Sebastianum Coleti. pp. 496–513.
