= San Marco Evangelista, Osimo =

Roman Catholic church in Italy

San Marco Evangelista is a Roman Catholic church in the town of Osimo, region of Marche, Italy.

== History ==
A church at the site, dedicated to Saint Mark the Evangelist, was erected in the 14th century by the Augustinian order adjacent to their convent, later becoming a hospital for the poor. The church underwent restoration after the church passed in the 15th century to the care of the Dominican order, who officiated in the church from 1428 to 1920. The interiors are now baroque in style

The interior conserves a number of artworks, including a 15th-century fresco in a lateral altar depicting the Enthroned Madonna with Child and Saints Dominic and Peter Martyr attributed by some to Arcangelo di Cola of Camerino or Pietro di Domenico of Montepulciano. In the choir is an altarpiece depicting the Madonna of the Rosary with St Dominic and Catherine of Siena (1642) by Guercino.
