= Francesco Cini =

Italian Roman Catholic prelate

Most Reverend Francesco Cini
- Bishop of Macerata e Tolentino
- Church: Catholic Church
- Diocese: Diocese of Macerata e Tolentino
- In office: 1660–1684
- Predecessor: Papirio Silvestri
- Successor: Fabrizio Paolucci

Orders
- Ordination: 26 September 1660
- Consecration: 21 November 1660 by Giulio Cesare Sacchetti

Personal details
- Born: 1610 Osimo, Italy
- Died: May 1684 (age 74)

Francesco Cini (1610 – May 1684) was a Roman Catholic prelate who served as Bishop of Macerata e Tolentino (1660–1684).

== Biography ==
Francesco Cini was born in Osimo, Italy, in 1610 and ordained as a priest on 26 September 1660. On 15 November 1660, he was appointed during the papacy of Pope Alexander VII as Bishop of Macerata e Tolentino. On 21 November 1660, he was consecrated bishop by Giulio Cesare Sacchetti, Cardinal-Bishop of Sabina, with Ottaviano Carafa, Titular Archbishop of Patrae, and Giovanni Agostino Marliani, Bishop Emeritus of Accia and Mariana, serving as co-consecrators. He served as Bishop of Macerata e Tolentino until his death in May 1684.

== See also ==
- Catholic Church in Italy

== External links and additional sources ==
- Cheney, David M. "Diocese of Macerata–Tolentino–Recanati–Cingoli–Treia". Catholic-Hierarchy.org. (for Chronology of Bishops) ^{[self-published]}
- Chow, Gabriel. "Diocese of Macerata–Tolentino–Recanati–Cingoli–Treia (Italy)". GCatholic.org. (for Chronology of Bishops) ^{[self-published]}

Catholic Church titles
Preceded by Papirio Silvestri	Bishop of Macerata e Tolentino; 1660–1684	Succeeded by Fabrizio Paolucci
