= San Niccolò, Osimo =

Church in the province of Ancona, Italy

Coordinates: 43°29′13.85″N 13°29′09.80″E

San Niccolò is a Roman Catholic church located on Via Pompeiana 25 in the town of Osimo, in the province of Ancona, region of Marche, Italy.

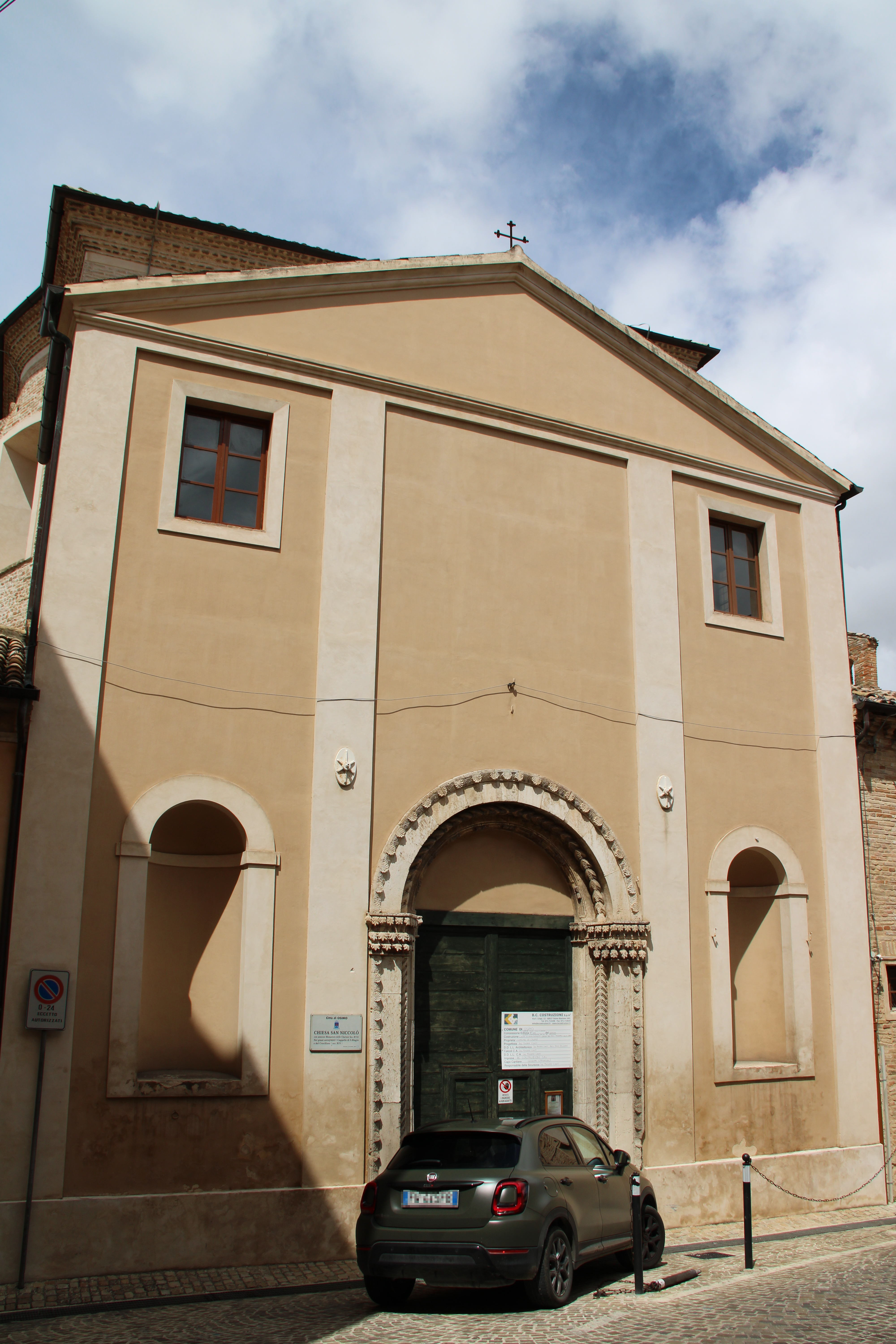
Church of San Niccolò

== History ==
A 10th-century church was located at the site prior to the major reconstruction during 1646-1649 leading to the present structure. The church was originally attached to a Benedictine convent. Traces of that Romanesque building remain in a chapel frescoed by Pietro di Domenico of Montepulciano, in the chapel of the Crucifix, and in the crypt. The Benedictines moved to the other abbey in town by the early 15th century. The church became a parish church, sometimes serving as the Duomo during the tumultuous late 1400s caused by the rebellion of Boccolino da Guzzone. In 1536 the church was assigned to Observant Poor Clares, under whom the church was rebuilt.

In the cloistered portion of the convent is a crucifix said to have miraculously bled during the Guelf and Ghibbeline wars in 1318. It is open on Saint Lucy's Day.

In 1810, under the Napoleonic government, the nuns were expelled until 1822; they were again expelled for a year in 1866. The Convent of San Niccolò in 2016 is inhabited by cloistered Clarissan nuns.
