= Guido Calcagnini =

Italian cardinal and titular archbishop

- Cardinal-Priest of Santa Maria in Traspontina
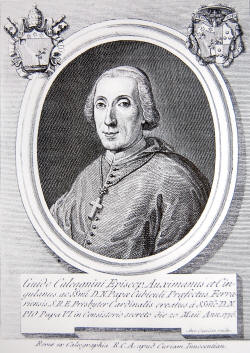
- Church: Catholic Church
- See: Santa Maria in Traspontina
- In office: 15 July 1776 – 27 August 1807
- Predecessor: Marcello Crescenzi
- Successor: Francesco Saverio Maria Felice Castiglioni
- Other post: (Arch)Bishop of Osimo e Cingoli (1776-1807)
- Previous posts: Prefect of the Papal Household (1775-1776); Titular Archbishop of Tarsus (1765-1776); Apostolic Nuncio to Naples (1765-1775)

Orders
- Ordination: 21 December 1764
- Consecration: 10 February 1765 by Pope Clement XIII
- Created cardinal: 20 May 1776 by Pope Pius VI

Personal details
- Born: 25 September 1725 Ferrara, Papal States
- Died: 27 August 1827 (aged 101) Osimo, Delegation of Acona, Papal States

Guido Calcagnini (25 September 1725 in Ferrara – 27 August 1807 in Osimo) was an Italian cardinal and titular archbishop in the Roman Catholic Church.

== Life ==
He was born into a noble family, as the son of the count palatine Cesare Calcagnini, marquess of Fusignano and a relation of cardinal Carlo Leopoldo Calcagnini. He studied at the Collegio dei Nobili di San Carlo at Modena and then at the Sapienza in Rome – at the latter, on 15 May 1747, he gained a doctorate in theology and in utroque iure.

He entered the papal court as private chamberlain to the pope in 1746.
