= Papirio Silvestri =

Italian Roman Catholic prelate

Most Reverend Papirio Silvestri
- Bishop of Macerata e Tolentino
- Church: Catholic Church
- In office: 1642–1659
- Predecessor: Felice Centini
- Successor: Francesco Cini

Orders
- Consecration: 3 August 1642 by Girolamo Verospi

Personal details
- Born: 1592 Cingoli, Italy
- Died: February 1659 (age 67)

Papirio Silvestri (1592–1659) was a Roman Catholic prelate who served as Bishop of Macerata e Tolentino (1642–1659).

== Biography ==
Papirio Silvestri was born in Cingoli, Italy in 1592. On 14 July 1642, he was appointed during the papacy of Pope Urban VIII as Bishop of Macerata e Tolentino. On 3 August 1642, he was consecrated bishop by Girolamo Verospi, Bishop of Osimo, with Giovanni Battista Altieri, Bishop Emeritus of Camerino, and Marco Antonio Coccini, Bishop of Anglona-Tursi, serving as co-consecrators. He served as Bishop of Macerata e Tolentino until his death in February 1659.

== Episcopal succession ==
While bishop, he was the principal co-consecrator of:

- Camillo Baldi (bishop), Bishop of Nicotera (1645);
- Domenico Cennini, Bishop of Gravina di Puglia (1645);
- Gian Vincenzo de' Giuli, Bishop of Massa Lubrense (1645);
- Giavanbattista Rainoldi, Bishop of Lucca (1645);
- Angelo Melchiori (Melchiorre), Bishop of Castellaneta (1645);
- Francesco Tello de León, Bishop of L'Aquila (1654);
- Marco Antonio Pisanelli, Bishop of Vulturara e Montecorvino (1654); and
- Giacinto Tarugi (Torisi), Bishop of Venosa (1654).

== External links and additional sources ==
- Cheney, David M. "Diocese of Macerata–Tolentino–Recanati–Cingoli–Treia". Catholic-Hierarchy.org. (for Chronology of Bishops) ^{[self-published]}
- Chow, Gabriel. "Diocese of Macerata–Tolentino–Recanati–Cingoli–Treia (Italy)". GCatholic.org. (for Chronology of Bishops) ^{[self-published]}

Catholic Church titles
Preceded by Felice Centini	Bishop of Macerata e Tolentino; 1642–1659	Succeeded by Francesco Cini
