= Fabrizio Paolucci =

Italian cardinal (1651–1726)

- Cardinal-Bishop of Ostia (e Velletri)
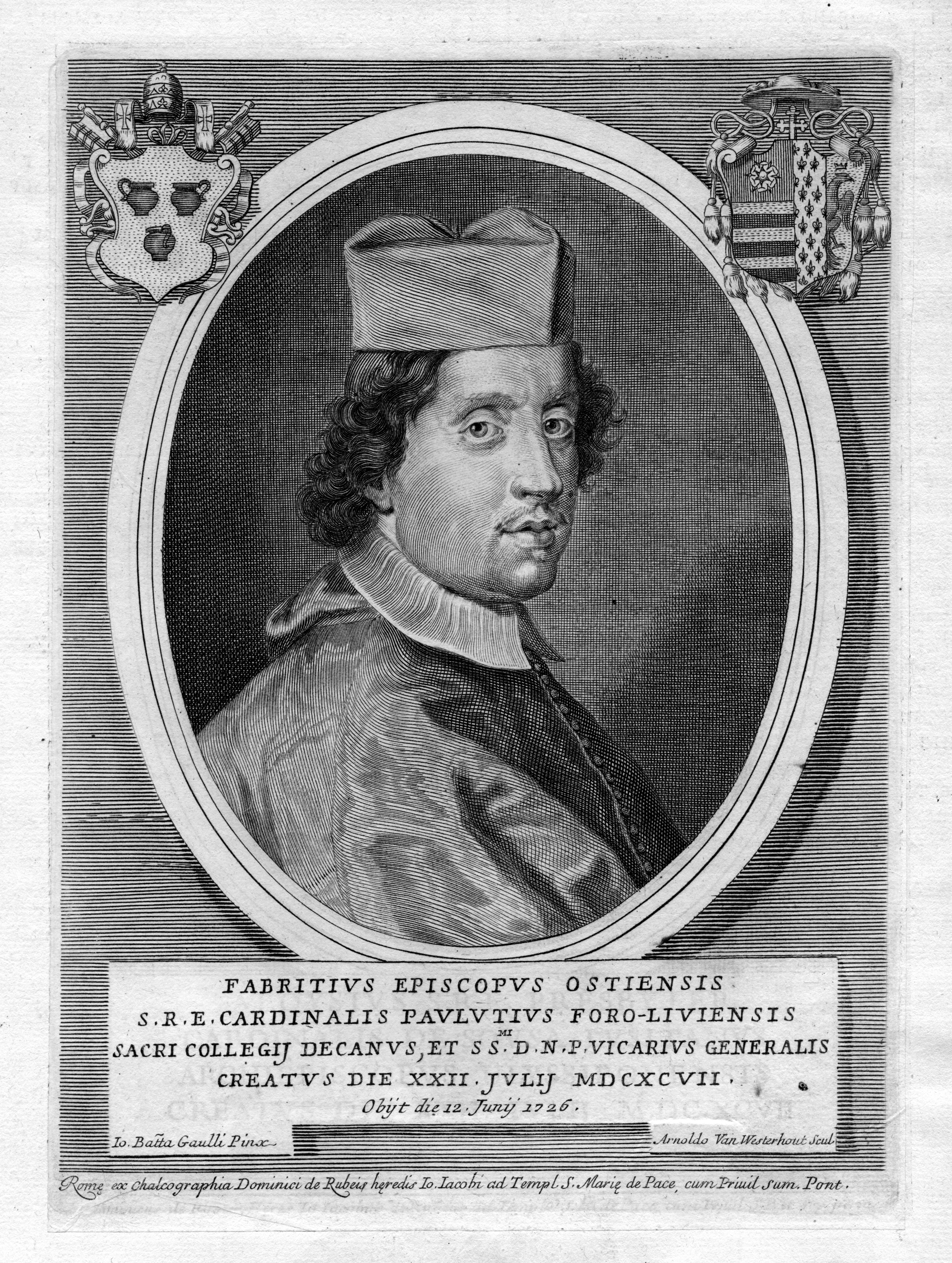
- Church: Catholic Church
- Diocese: Ostia (e Velletri)
- In office: 19 November 1725 – 12 June 1726
- Predecessor: Francesco del Giudice
- Successor: Francesco Barberini, Jr.
- Other posts: Secretary of the Congregation for Universal Inquisition (1725-1726); Vicar General of Rome (1721-1726); Secretary of State (1700-1721, 1724-1726)
- Previous posts: Cardinal-Bishop of Porto e Santa Rufina (1724-1725); Prefect of the Congregation of Bishops and Regulars (1721-1724); Cardinal-Bishop of Albano (1719-1724); Major Penitentiary of the Apostolic Penitentiary (1710-1721); Cardinal-Priest of Santi Giovanni e Paolo (1699-1719); Pro-Major Penitentiary of the Apostolic Penitentiary (1709-1710); Bishop of Ferrara (1698-1701); Apostolic Nuncio to Germany (1696-1698); Bishop of Macerata e Tolentino (1685-1698)

Orders
- Consecration: 6 May 1685 by Gaspare Carpegna
- Created cardinal: 19 December 1698 by Pope Innocent XII

Personal details
- Born: 2 April 1651 Forlì, Romagna, Papal States
- Died: 12 June 1726 (aged 75) Rome, Papal States

Fabrizio Paolucci (2 April 1651 – 12 June 1726) was an Italian cardinal in the Roman Catholic Church, appointed by Pope Innocent XII.

== Biography ==
Born at Forlì, he went to Rome at the age of eight, in 1659, to be educated by his grand-uncle, Francesco Paolucci. In 1685 he was elected bishop of Macerata and Tolentino, April 9, 1685, and later was appointed Nuncio in Cologne in 1696.

Pope Innocent XII elevated him to the rank of cardinal in the consistory of 19 December 1698, and he became archbishop of Ferrara. He became Cardinal Secretary of State during the pontificate of Pope Clement XI. On Clement's death, at the succeeding conclave of 1721, Paolucci was the strongest candidate to succeed, but was vetoed by Charles VI, Holy Roman Emperor as he considered him too close to the French. Instead Michelangelo Conti was elected as Pope Innocent XIII. After the latter's death in 1724 Paolucci was again one of the leading candidates for the papacy, but again the imperial veto played its part. However, with the election of Pope Benedict XIII, he resumed the role of Secretary of State and held the position until his death.

It was Paolucci who ordered the construction of the neoclassical Palazzo Paolucci de Calboli at Forlì.

He died on 12 June 1726 at the age of 75 years.

== Sources ==
- Renata Ago, Carriere e clientele nella Roma barocca, Rome-Bari, Laterza, 1990.
- Miranda, Salvador. "PAOLUCCI, Fabrizio (1651-1726)". The Cardinals of the Holy Roman Church. Florida International University. OCLC 53276621.
- Cheney, David M. "Fabrizio Cardinal Paolucci". Catholic-Hierarchy.org. ^{[self-published]}

Catholic Church titles
Preceded by Francesco Cini	Bishop of Macerata e Tolentino; 1685–1698	Succeeded by Alessandro Carlo Gaetano Varano
Preceded by Gianantonio Davia	Apostolic Nuncio to Germany; 1696–1698	Succeeded by Orazio Filippo Spada
Preceded by Domenico Tarugi	Archbishop (Personal Title) of Ferrara; 1698–1701	Succeeded by Taddeo Luigi dal Verme
Preceded by Fortunato Ilario Carafa della Spina	Cardinal-Priest of Santi Giovanni e Paolo; 1699–1719	Succeeded by Niccolò Maria Lercari
Preceded by Fabrizio Spada	Cardinal Secretary of State (first time); 3 December 1700 – 19 March 1721	Succeeded by Giorgio Spinola
Preceded by Leandro Colloredo	Major Penitentiary of the Apostolic Penitentiary; 1709–1721	Succeeded by Bernardo Maria Conti
Preceded by Ferdinando d'Adda	Cardinal-Bishop of Albano; 1719–1724	Succeeded by Giacomo Boncompagni
Preceded by	Vicar General of Rome; 1721	Succeeded by
Preceded by Gasparo Carpegna	Prefect of the Congregation of Bishops and Regulars; 1721–1724	Succeeded by Giuseppe Firrao
Preceded by Giorgio Spinola	Cardinal Secretary of State (second time); 6 June 1724 – 12 June 1726	Succeeded by Niccolò Maria Lercari
Preceded by Pietro Francesco Orsini de Gravina	Cardinal-Bishop of Porto e Santa Rufina; 1724–1725	Succeeded by Francesco Pignatelli (seniore)
Preceded by	Secretary of the Congregation for Universal Inquisition; 1725–1726	Succeeded by Pietro Ottoboni
Preceded by Francesco del Giudice	Cardinal-Bishop of Ostia e Velletri; 1725–1726	Succeeded by Francesco Barberini (iuniore)
