= Achille Manara =

His Eminence Achille Manara
- Archbishop of Ancona e Umana
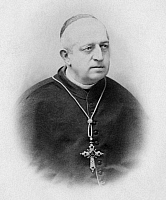
- Church: Roman Catholic Church
- Archdiocese: Ancona e Umana
- See: Ancona e Umana
- Appointed: 12 May 1879 (diocese); 14 September 1904 (archdiocese)
- Term ended: 15 February 1906
- Predecessor: Antonio Benedetto Antonucci
- Successor: Giovanni Battista Ricci
- Other post: Cardinal-Priest of San Pancrazio (1895-1906)

Orders
- Ordination: 25 May 1850
- Consecration: 22 May 1879 by Raffaele Monaco La Valletta
- Created cardinal: 29 November 1895 by Pope Leo XIII
- Rank: Cardinal-Priest

Personal details
- Born: Achille Manara; 20 November 1827 Bologna, Papal Legations
- Died: 15 February 1906 (aged 78) Ancona, Kingdom of Italy
- Education: University of Bologna

Achille Manara (20 November 1827 – 15 February 1906) was an Italian prelate of the Catholic Church who became a bishop in 1879, a cardinal in 1895, and an archbishop in 1904.

== Biography ==
Manara was born in Bologna on 20 November 1827. He was ordained a priest on 25 May 1850. He received a doctorate in theology from the Seminary of Bologna on 11 July 1851 and a doctorate in civil and canon law at the University of Bologna on 6 July 1855.

On 12 May 1879, Pope Leo XIII appointed him Bishop of Ancona-Humana. He received his episcopal consecration on 22 May from Cardinal Raffaele Monaco La Valletta, the Vicar General of Rome. Pope Leo raised him to the rank of cardinal on 29 November 1895, assigning him the title of San Pancrazio.

He participated in the 1903 conclave that elected Pope Pius X.

When the Diocese of Ancona-Humana became the Archdiocese of Ancona on 14 September 1904, he was promoted to archbishop.

He died in Ancona on 15 February 1906 at the age of 78.
