= Diocese of Macerata-Tolentino-Recanati-Cingoli-Treia =

Roman Catholic diocese in Italy

Coordinates: 43°18′02″N 13°27′24″E

Diocese of Macerata-Tolentino-Recanati-Cingoli-Treia Dioecesis Maceratensis-Tolentina-Recinetensis-Cingulana-Treiensis

Catholic
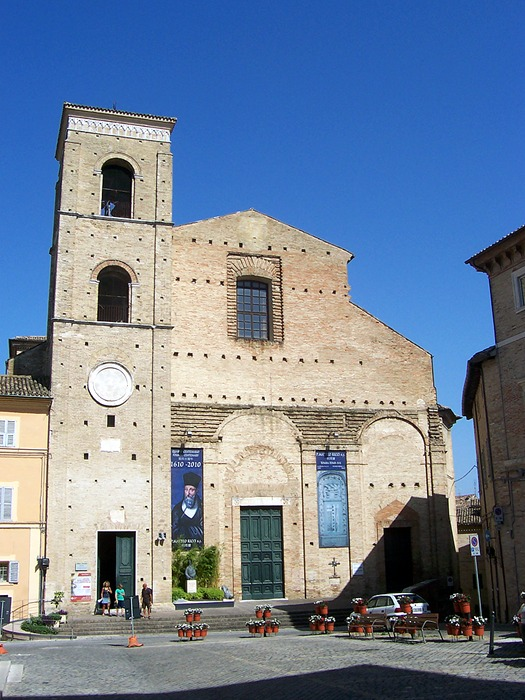
- Cathedral of Macerata

Location
- Country: Italy
- Ecclesiastical province: Fermo

Statistics
- Area: 745 km^{2} (288 sq mi)
- Population: Total; Catholics: (as of 2016); 148,000 (est.); 142,200 (guess) (96.1%)
- Parishes: 67

Information
- Denomination: Catholic Church
- Rite: Roman Rite
- Established: 18 November 1320 (705 years ago)
- Cathedral: Cattedrale di S. Giuliano (Macerata)
- Co-cathedral: Basilica Cattedrale di S. Flaviano (Recanati); Basilica Concattedrale di S. Catervo (Tolentino); Concattedrale di S. Maria Assunta (Cingoli); Concattedrale di SS. Annunziata (Treia)
- Secular priests: 108 (diocesan); 34 (Religious Orders); 13 Permanent Deacons

Current leadership
- Pope: Leo XIV
- Bishop: Nazzareno Marconi
- Bishops emeritus: Claudio Giuliodori

Map

Website
- www.diocesimacerata.it

The Diocese of Macerata-Tolentino-Recanati-Cingoli-Treia (Latin: Dioecesis Maceratensis-Tolentina-Recinetensis-Cingulana-Treiensis) is a Latin diocese of the Catholic Church in Italy. It is a suffragan of the Archdiocese of Fermo.

== History ==
In the 13th century the territory and city of Recanati became heavily involved in the struggles between Guelphs and Ghibbelines. On 27 July 1263 the diocese was completely suppressed by Pope Urban IV in the Bull Cives Recanatensis, due to its support of Manfred, who claimed the Kingdom of Sicily. It was not restored until 1289. By the beginning of the 14th century the anti-papalist Ghibbelines were in control, and rejected papal control through the Rector of the Marches. In order to bring Recanati into submission, Pope John XXII embarked upon a program of punishment which included the reduction of Recanati's civil status and the removal of the bishopric. The Diocese of Recanati suppressed in 1320, and did not regain its episcopal status until 1356.

The Diocese of Macerata was established by Pope John XXII on 18 November 1320, in the Bull Sicut ex debito, which also suppressed the diocese of Recanati. The castrum Maceratae was raised to the status of a city, and its territory, which was partly in the diocese of Camerino and partly in the diocese of Fermo, was detached from those two dioceses and included in the new diocese of Macerata. The parish church of S. Giuliano in Macerata was elevated to the status of a cathedral, and the seat of the bishop of Macerata installed in it. Bishop Fridericus of Recanati was transferred to the new See of Macerata, with all the powers, rights, and privileges which he had enjoyed when Bishop of Recanati. The cathedral Chapter of Recanata was also transferred to the Cathedral of S. Giuliano in Macerata, with the same dignities, grades, numbers, and income as they had enjoyed at Recanati.

In 1698, the cathedral Chapter of Macerata had one dignity, the Archdeacon, and seventeen Canons.

On 17 March 1586, Pope Sixtus V, in the Bull Pro excellenti, raised the town of Loreto to the status of a bishopric. To provide territory to support the apparatus of a diocese, the already existing diocese of Recanati was suppressed, and its territory was transferred to the new diocese of Loreto. The cathedral of Recanati was demoted to the status of collegiate church. Bishop Galeazzo Moroni, the Bishop of Recanati who was also Bishop of Macerata, was released from his connection to the diocese of Recanati. To compensate the diocese of Macerata for the loss of Recanati, it was united with the newly (re-)created Diocese of Tolentino on 10 December 1586.

The diocese, in its current configuration, was established in order to conform to Italian civil law which was embodied in the Concordat between the Vatican and the Italian Republic of 18 February 1984. After extensive consultations, Pope John Paul II decreed that the status of the bishop governing several dioceses aeque personaliter was abolished, and that the Diocese of Macerata-Tolentino was merged with the Diocese of Osimo e Cingoli, the Diocese of Recanati and the Diocese of San Severino (Treia) to form a single diocese, albeit with a long name. The changes were embodied in a decree of the Sacred Congregation of Bishops in the Roman Curia, promulgated on 30 September 1986. The seat of the merged dioceses was to be in Macerata. All of the cathedrals except Macerata were to have the status of co-cathedral. The diocesan offices (curia) was to be in Macerata, as was the diocesan tribunal, the diocesan seminary, the College of Consultors, the Priests' Council, unless otherwise directed by the bishop.

On 17 April 1772, the city of Macerata witnessed the marriage of Charles Edward Stuart (the Young Pretender) and Princess Louise of Stolberg-Gedern, performed by Bishop Carlo Augusto Peruzzini (1756–1777) of Macerata.

=== Synods ===
A diocesan synod was an irregularly held, but important, meeting of the bishop of a diocese and his clergy. Its purpose was (1) to proclaim generally the various decrees already issued by the bishop; (2) to discuss and ratify measures on which the bishop chose to consult with his clergy; (3) to publish statutes and decrees of the diocesan synod, of the provincial synod, and of the Holy See.

Bishop Papirio Silvestri (1642–1659) held a diocesan synod in Macerata on 12 September 1651. In 1663, Bishop Francesco Cini (1660–1684) presided over a diocesan synod in Macerata. In 1687 Bishop Fabrizio Paolucci (1685–1698) had his Synodial Constitutions published, but it is uncertain when he held his synod.

In 1728, Bishop Alessandro Carlo Gaetano Varano (1698–1735) held a diocesan synod. Bishop Domenico Spinucci (1777–1796) held a diocesan synod in Macerata on 9–11 May 1784, and another at Tolentino on 23–25 May. Bishop Francesco Ansaldo Teloni (1824–1846) held a diocesan synod in Macerata from 8 to 10 August 1830, and another in Tolentino from 22 to 24 August 1830. The decisions were published in 1832.

== Bishops ==
=== Diocese of Macerata ===
- Federico (18 November 1320 – 6 June 1323)
- Pietro Mulucci, O.Min. (1323–1347)
- Guido da Riparia (1347–1349)
- Nicolò da San Martino, O.P. (21 October 1349 – 8 January 1356)

=== Diocese of Recanati e Macerata ===
- Nicolò da San Martino, O.P. (1356–1369)
- Oliviero (1369–1374)
- Giovanni di Bartolomeo (1374–1383)
- Paolo (19 September 1382 – ?) (Avignon Obedience)
- Niccolò Vanni (1383–?) (Roman Obedience)
- Angelo Cino (1385–1409 deposed)(Roman Obedience)
- Angelo Baglioni (1409–1412) (Pisan Obedience)
- Nicolaus, O.E.S.A. (1412–1418) (Pisan Obedience)
- Marinus de Tocco (1418–1428)
- Benedetto Guidalotti (1429)
- Giovanni Vitelleschi (1431–1435)
- Thomas Tomasini, O.P. (1435–1440)
- Nicolaus d' Asti (1440–1460)
- Petrus Giorgii (1460–1469)

Francesco Morosini (1470–1471) Administrator

- Andreas de Pilis (1471–1476)
- Gerolamo della Rovere (1476–1507)
- Teseo de Cupis (1507–1516 Resigned)
- Luigi Tasso (1516–1520 Died)
- Cardinal Giovanni Domenico de Cupis (1522–1535 Resigned) Administrator

=== Diocese of Macerata ===
- Giovanni Leclerc (29 Jan 1535 – 1545 Died)
- Filippo Roccabella (27 Jan 1546 – 6 Mar 1553)

=== Diocese of Recanati e Macerata ===
- Gerolamo Melchiori (6 Mar 1553 – 1573 Resigned)
- Galeazzo Moroni (1573–1586)

The diocese of Recanati was suppressed on 17 March 1586.

=== Diocese of Macerata e Tolentino ===
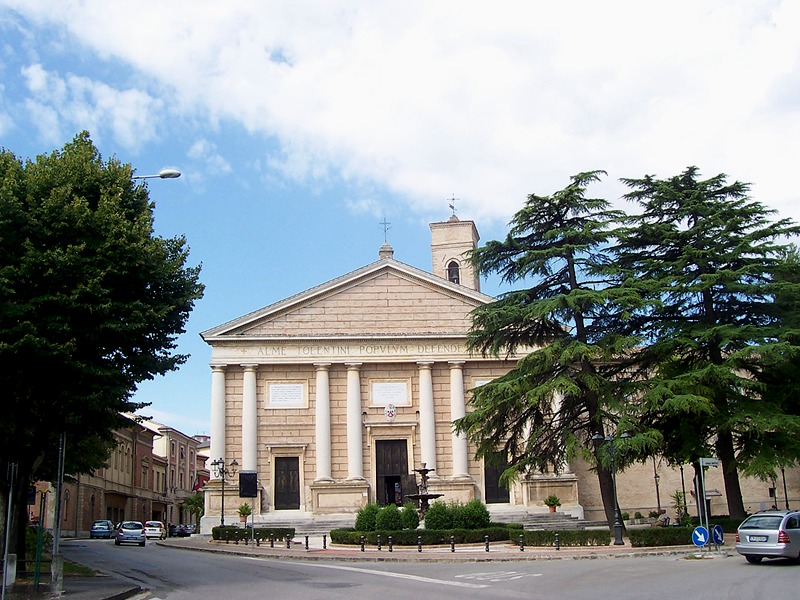
Cathedral of Tolentino (S. Catervo)

Latin Name: Maceratensis et Tolentina
United: 10 December 1586 with the Diocese of Tolentino

- Cardinal Felice Centini, O.F.M. Conv. (1613–1641)
- Papirio Silvestri (1642–1659)
- Francesco Cini (1660–1684)
- Fabrizio Paolucci (1685–1698)
- Alessandro Carlo Gaetano Varano (1698–1735)
- Ignazio Stelluti (1735–1756)
- Carlo Augusto Peruzzini, B. (1756–1777)
- Domenico Spinucci (1777–1796)
- Alessandro Alessandretti (1796–1800)
- Vincenzo Maria Strambi, C.P. (1801–1823)
- Francesco Ansaldo Teloni (24 May 1824 – 31 January 1846 Died)
- Luigi Clementi (1846–1851)
- Amadio Zangari (1851–1864)
- Gaetano Franceschini (27 March 1867 – 31 May 1881 Died)
- Sebastiano Galeati (4 August 1881 – 23 May 1887 Appointed, Archbishop of Ravenna)
- Roberto Papiri (Pageri) (25 November 1887 – 29 November 1895 Appointed, Archbishop of Fermo)
- Giovanni Battista Ricci (29 November 1895 – 9 June 1902 Appointed, Bishop of Jesi)
- Raniero Sarnari (9 June 1902 – 25 January 1916 Died)
- Romolo Molaroni (30 September 1916 – 14 August 1919 Died)
- Domenico Pasi (15 December 1919 – 20 September 1923 Died)
- Luigi Ferretti (24 March 1924 – 26 November 1934 Died)
- Domenico Argnani (15 June 1935 – 1 October 1947 Died)
- Silvio Cassulo (28 April 1948 – 27 November 1968 Died)
- Ersilio Tonini (28 April 1969 – 22 November 1975 Appointed, Archbishop of Ravenna e Cervia)
- Francesco Tarcisio Carboni (11 February 1976 – 20 November 1995 Died)

=== Diocese of Macerata-Tolentino-Recanati-Cingoli-Treia ===
United: 25 January 1985 with the territory of the former Diocese of Treia, the Diocese of Macerata e Tolentino, the Diocese of Osimo e Cingoli, and the Diocese of Recanati

- Luigi Conti (28 Jun 1996 – 13 Apr 2006)
- Claudio Giuliodori (22 Feb 2007 – 26 Feb 2013 Resigned)
- Nazzareno Marconi (3 Jun 2014 – )

== Churches ==
- San Pietro Apostolo, Civitanova Marche

== See also ==
- Roman Catholic Diocese of Recanati
- Diocese of Cingoli

== Bibliography ==
=== Reference works for bishops ===
- Gams, Pius Bonifatius (1873). Series episcoporum Ecclesiae catholicae: quotquot innotuerunt a beato Petro apostolo (in Latin). Ratisbon: Typis et Sumptibus Georgii Josephi Manz. pp. 703, 719.
- Eubel, Conradus, ed. (1913). Hierarchia catholica (in Latin). Vol. Tomus 1 (second ed.). Münster: Libreria Regensbergiana. (in Latin)
- Eubel, Conradus, ed. (1914). Hierarchia catholica (in Latin). Vol. Tomus 2 (second ed.). Münster: Libreria Regensbergiana.
- Gulik, Guilelmus (1923). Eubel, Conradus (ed.). Hierarchia catholica (in Latin). Vol. Tomus 3 (second ed.). Münster: Libreria Regensbergiana.
- Gauchat, Patritius (Patrice) (1935). Hierarchia catholica. Vol. Tomus IV (1592-1667). Münster: Libraria Regensbergiana.
- Ritzler, Remigius; Sefrin, Pirminus (1952). Hierarchia catholica medii et recentis aevi. Vol. Tomus V (1667-1730). Patavii: Messagero di S. Antonio.
- Ritzler, Remigius; Sefrin, Pirminus (1958). Hierarchia catholica medii et recentis aevi. Vol. Tomus VI (1730-1799). Patavii: Messagero di S. Antonio.
- Ritzler, Remigius; Sefrin, Pirminus (1968). Hierarchia Catholica medii et recentioris aevi (in Latin). Vol. VII (1800–1846). Monasterii: Libreria Regensburgiana.
- Remigius Ritzler; Pirminus Sefrin (1978). Hierarchia catholica Medii et recentioris aevi (in Latin). Vol. VIII (1846–1903). Il Messaggero di S. Antonio.
- Pięta, Zenon (2002). Hierarchia catholica medii et recentioris aevi (in Latin). Vol. IX (1903–1922). Padua: Messagero di San Antonio. ISBN 978-88-250-1000-8.

=== Studies ===
- Acquacotta, Camillo (1838). Memorie di Matelica (in Italian). Ancona: dalla Tipografia Baluffi. p. 191.
- Cappelletti, Giuseppe (1845). Le chiese d'Italia (in Italian). Vol. terzo. Venice: G. Antonelli. pp. 665–686, 698–705.
- Cappelletti, Giuseppe (1848). Le chiese d'Italia della loro origine sino ai nostri giorni (in Italian). Vol. settimo. Venezia: G. Antonelli. pp. 609–648.
- Colucci, Giuseppe (1790). Delle antichità Picene (in Italian). Vol. Tomo VII. Fermo: dai torchi dell'autore per G.A. Paccaroni.
- Leopardi, Monaldo (1828). Serie dei vescovi di Recanati (in Italian). Recanati: Presso Giuseppe Morici. p. 1.
- Stefani, G. (1856). Dizionario corografico dello Stato Pontificio (in Italian). Milano e Verona: Presso gli Stabilimenti di Civelli G. e C. pp. 563–577.
- Ughelli, Ferdinando; Coleti, Niccolò (1717). Italia sacra, sive De Episcopis Italiae, et insularum adjacentium (in Latin). Vol. Tomus secundus. Venice: apud Sebastianum Coleti. pp. 729–747, 770–776.
- Vogel, Josephus Antonius (1859). De Ecclesiis Recanatensi et Lauretana Earumque Episcopis (in Latin). Recanati: Leonardo Badaloni.
