= Francesco Accolti (bishop) =

1xth-century Roman Catholic bishop

Most Reverend Francesco de Accolti
- Bishop of Ancona e Numana
- Church: Catholic Church
- Diocese: Diocese of Ancona e Numana
- In office: 1514–1523
- Predecessor: Pietro de Accolti de Aretio
- Successor: Baldovinetto de' Baldovinetti

Francesco de Accolti was a Roman Catholic prelate who served as Bishop of Ancona e Numana (1514–1523).

== Biography ==
On 5 Apr 1514, Francesco de Accolti was appointed during the papacy of Pope Leo X as Bishop of Ancona e Numana. He served as Bishop of Ancona e Numana until his resignation in 1523.

== External links and additional sources ==
- Cheney, David M. "Archdiocese of Ancona-Osimo". Catholic-Hierarchy.org. (for Chronology of Bishops) ^{[self-published]}
- Chow, Gabriel. "Metropolitan Archdiocese of Ancona–Osimo (Italy)". GCatholic.org. (for Chronology of Bishops) ^{[self-published]}

Catholic Church titles
Preceded by Pietro de Accolti de Aretio	Bishop of Ancona e Numana; 1514–1523	Succeeded by Baldovinetto de' Baldovinetti
