= Clemente da Osimo =

Italian Roman Catholic professed religious

Blessed Clemente da Osimo O.S.A.

Priest
- Born: 1235; Osimo, Papal States
- Died: 8 April 1291 (aged 56); Orvieto, Papal States
- Venerated in: Roman Catholic Church
- Beatified: 1761, Saint Peter's Basilica, Papal States by Pope Clement XIII
- Feast: 8 April; 19 May (Augustinians)
- Attributes: Augustinian habit
- Patronage: San Elpidio

Clemente da Osimo (1235 – 8 April 1291) was an Italian Roman Catholic professed religious and a member of the Order of Saint Augustine. He was hailed as a reformer of the order.

The recognition of his "cultus" (or popular following) allowed for Pope Clement XIII to preside over his beatification in 1761.

== Life ==
Clemente da Osimo was born in Osimo in 1235.

He belonged to the Congregation of Hermits of Brettino though exited the order and instead entered the Order of Saint Augustine in Brettino in 1256 at the Grand Union. Clemente was later chosen as the Provincial of the Marche province of the order in 1269. He was twice made Prior General and served his first term from Pentecost of 1271 until 1274 when he resigned though he was later re-elected in 1284 (in a unanimous verdict) and held that position until his death. In his first term he visited houses on the Italian peninsula as well as in the Kingdom of France. He participated in the Second Council of Lyons in 1274 that Pope Gregory X convoked which gave the order a fear of suppression that festered over the next few decades; it was at the order's 1274 general chapter that he resigned from his first term.

The re-elected Clemente was given the task of revising the constitutions of the order in 1284. He and Blessed Augustine of Tarano helped to revise the Regensburg Constitution of the order in response to this call and this was completed in 1290. He also encouraged formal studies for priests and founded a total of five schools while also promoting the foundation of order houses that were designed for women.

He died on 8 April 1291. His reputation for holiness prompted Pope Nicholas IV to suspend his funeral to allow people more time to flock to Orvieto - where he died - for his funeral. His remains were relocated to Rome on 4 May 1970.

== Beatification ==
The recognition of his "cultus" (or popular devotion) allowed for Pope Clement XIII to celebrate his beatification in 1761.
