= Roman Catholic Diocese of Osimo =

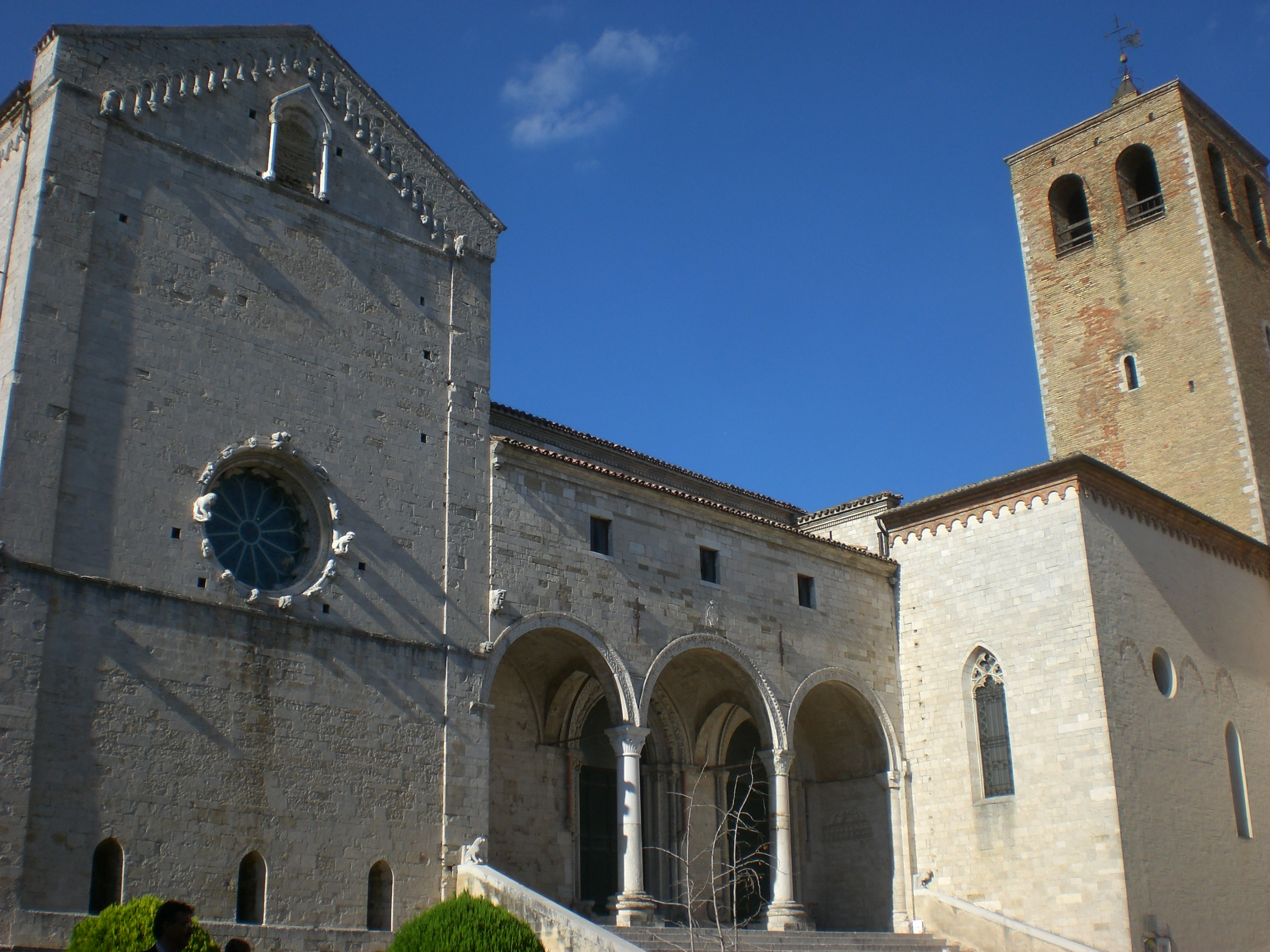
Osimo Cathedral

The Roman Catholic Diocese of Osimo was an ancient diocese in Italy. It was founded in the seventh century and in 1725 merged with the Diocese of Cingoli to form the Diocese of Osimo e Cingoli. It was contained within the Papal States.

== Ordinaries ==
=== Diocese of Osimo ===
Erected: 7th Century
Latin Name: Auximanus

- Giambattista Sinibaldi (Joannes Baptista de Sinibaldis) (13 Jun 1515 – 9 Apr 1547 Died)
- Cipriano Senili (Cyprianis Senili) (13 May 1547 – 19 Jul 1551 Died)
- Bernardino de Cupis (bishop) (24 Aug 1551 – 1574 Resigned)
- Cornelio Firmano (9 Jan 1574 – 5 Jul 1588 Died)
- Teodosio Fiorenzi (Theodosius Florentinus) (27 Jul 1588 – 19 May 1591 Died)
- Antonio Maria Gallo (19 Jul 1591 – 30 Mar 1620 Died)
- Agostino Galamini, OP (29 Apr 1620 – 6 Sep 1639 Died)
- Girolamo Verospi (10 Feb 1642 – 5 Jan 1652 Died)
- Lodovico Betti (1 Jul 1652 – 1655 Died)
- Antonio Bichi (6 Mar 1656 – 21 Feb 1691 Died)
- Opizio Pallavicini (8 Aug 1691 – 11 Feb 1700 Died)
- Michelangelo dei Conti (28 Jan 1709 – 1 Aug 1712 Appointed, Archbishop (Personal Title) of Viterbo e Tuscania)
- Orazio Filippo Spada (17 Jan 1714 – 28 Jun 1724 Died)
- Agostino Pipia, OP (20 Dec 1724 – Jan 1726 Resigned)

=== Diocese of Osimo e Cingoli ===
19 August 1725: United with the Diocese of Cingoli
Immediately Subject to the Holy See

- Pier Secondo Radicati de Cocconato (12 Apr 1728 – 1 Dec 1729 Died)
- Ferdinando Agostino Bernabei, OP (23 Dec 1729 – 10 Mar 1734 Died)
- Giacomo Lanfredini (27 Mar 1734 – 15 Sep 1740 Resigned)
- Pompeo Compagnoni (16 Sep 1740 – 25 Jul 1774 Died)
- Guido Calcagnini (20 May 1776 – 27 Aug 1807 Died)
- Giovanni Castiglione (11 Jan 1808 – 9 Jan 1815 Died)
- Carlo Andrea Pelagallo (18 Dec 1815 – 6 Sep 1822 Died)
- Ercole Dandini (10 Mar 1823 – 23 May 1824 Resigned)
- Timoteo Maria (Antonio) Ascensi, OCD (21 May 1827 – 6 Dec 1828 Died)
- Giovanni Antonio Benvenuti (15 Dec 1828 – 14 Nov 1838 Died)
- Giovanni Soglia Ceroni (18 Feb 1839 – 4 Jun 1848 Appointed, Secretary of State)
- Giovanni Brunelli (18 Sep 1856 – 21 Feb 1861 Died)
- Salvatore Nobili Vitelleschi (21 Dec 1863 – 20 Nov 1871 Resigned)
- Michele Seri-Molini (24 Nov 1871 – 13 Apr 1888 Died)
- Egidio Mauri, OP (1 Jun 1888 – 12 Jun 1893 Appointed, Archbishop of Ferrara)
- Giovanni Battista Scotti (18 May 1894 – 5 Dec 1916 Died)
- Pacifico Fiorani (12 May 1917 – 22 Jun 1924 Died)
- Monalduzio Leopardi (20 Dec 1926 – 17 May 1944 Died)
- Domenico Brizi (22 Jan 1945 – 11 Feb 1964 Died)
- Carlo Maccari (28 Sep 1972 – 30 Sep 1986 Appointed, Archbishop of Ancona-Osimo)

=== Diocese of Osimo ===
25 January 1985: The former Diocese of Cingoli was split from the Diocese of Osimo e Cingoli and united with the Diocese of Macerata e Tolentino, the Diocese of Recanati, and the Diocese of San Severino (-Treia) to form the Diocese of Macerata-Tolentino-Recanati-Cingoli-Treia.

30 September 1986: the Diocese of Osimo was united with the Archdiocese of Ancona to form the Archdiocese of Ancona-Osimo
