= Cardinals created by Innocent XIII =

Catholic appointments in 1721

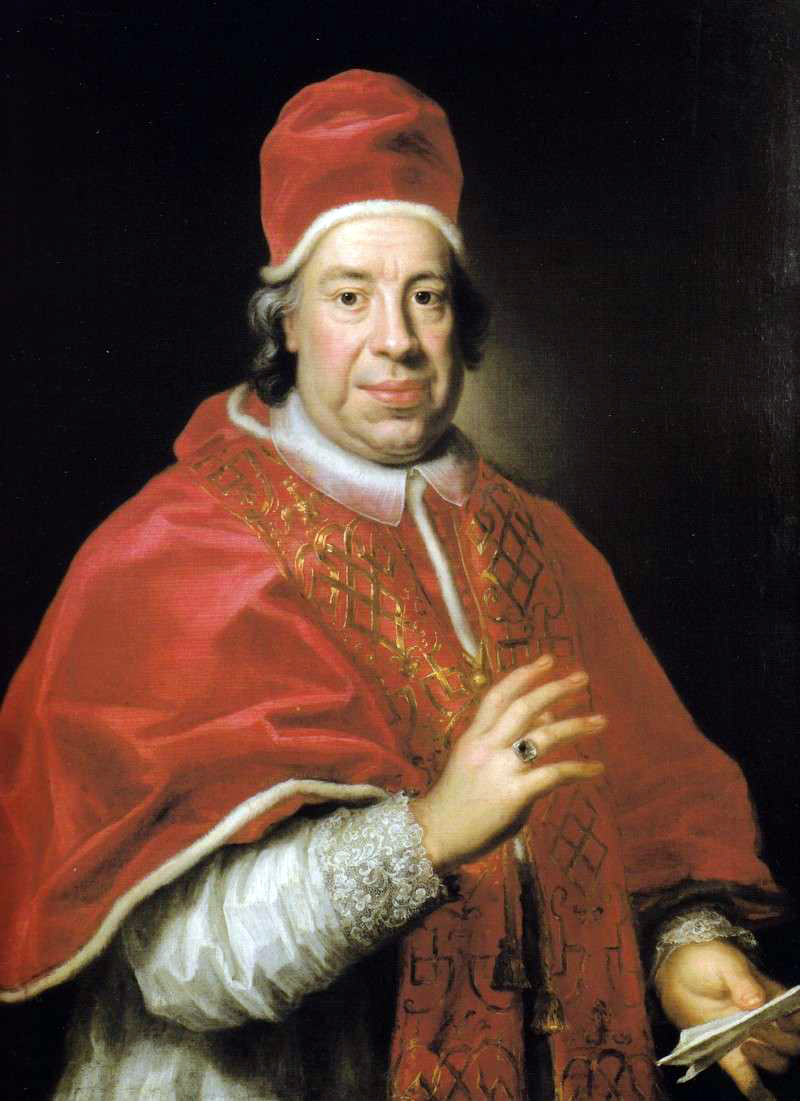
Pope Innocent XIII (1655-1724)

Pope Innocent XIII (r. 1721–1724) created three cardinals in two consistories:

== 16 June 1721 ==
1. Bernardo Maria Conti, O.S.B.Cas., brother of the Pope – cardinal-priest of S. Bernardo alle Terme (received the title on 16 July 1721), † 23 April 1730

== 16 July 1721 ==
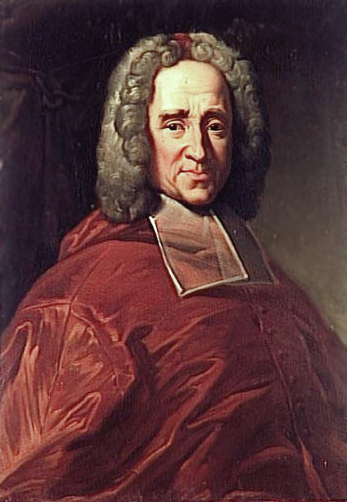
Guillaume Dubois (1656-1723), made a cardinal on July 16, 1721

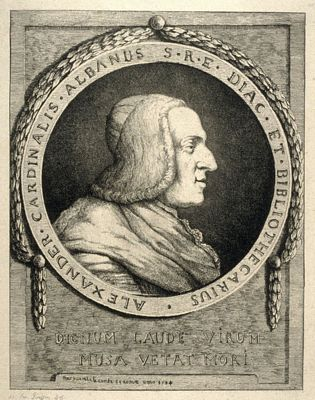
Alessandro Albani (1692-1779), made a cardinal on July 16, 1721

1. Guillaume Dubois, archbishop of Cambrai – cardinal-priest without the title, † 10 August 1723
2. Alessandro Albani – cardinal-deacon of S. Adriano (received the title on 24 September 1724), then cardinal-deacon of S. Maria in Cosmedin (23 September 1722), cardinal-deacon of S. Agata in Suburra (7 August 1741), cardinal-deacon of S. Maria ad martyres (11 March 1743), cardinal-deacon of S. Maria in Via Lata (10 April 1747), † 11 December 1779
