= Francesco Antonozzi =

Italian painter (1685–1741)

Francesco Antonozzi (1685 in Osimo or Loreto, Province of Ancona, Papal States – 1741 in Rome) was an Italian painter, depicting religious topics, figures, and landscape.

He was active in province of Ancona and Rome. He was born to a local painter in Loreto, Marche, but studied in Rome under Carlo Maratta. He painted an altarpiece in Rome for the church of San Nicola dei Lorenesi. He is said to have painted landscapes and figures. He died of phthisis.
