= Cornelio Firmano =

The Most Reverend Cornelio Firmano
- Bishop of Osimo
- Church: Catholic Church
- Diocese: Diocese of Osimo
- In office: 1574–1588
- Predecessor: Bernardino de Cupis (bishop)
- Successor: Antonio Maria Gallo

Orders
- Consecration: 21 Feb 1574 by Scipione Rebiba

Personal details
- Died: 5 July 1588 Osimo, Italy

Cornelio Firmano (died 5 Jul 1588) was a Roman Catholic prelate who served as Bishop of Osimo (1574–1588).

== Biography ==
On 9 Jan 1574, Cornelio Firmano was appointed during the papacy of Pope Gregory XIII as Bishop of Osimo. On 21 Feb 1574, he was consecrated bishop by Scipione Rebiba, Cardinal-Bishop of Albano. He served as Bishop of Osimo until his death on 5 Jul 1588. While bishop, he was the principal co-consecrator of Filippo Sega, Bishop of Ripatransone (1575); and Niccolò Aragonio (Aragona), Bishop of Ripatransone (1578)

Catholic Church titles
Preceded by Bernardino de Cupis (bishop)	Bishop of Osimo; 1574–1588	Succeeded by Antonio Maria Gallo
