= Alessandro Carlo Gaetano Varano =

Italian Roman Catholic prelate

Most Reverend Alessandro Carlo Gaetano Varano
- Bishop of Macerata e Tolentino
- Church: Catholic Church
- Diocese: Diocese of Macerata e Tolentino
- In office: 1698–1735
- Predecessor: Fabrizio Paolucci
- Successor: Ignazio Stelluti

Orders
- Ordination: 22 June 1692
- Consecration: 17 August 1698 by Sebastiano Antonio Tanara

Personal details
- Born: 30 December 1667 Ferrara, Italy
- Died: 20 October 1735 (age 67)

Alessandro Carlo Gaetano Varano (1667–1735) was a Roman Catholic prelate who served as Bishop of Macerata e Tolentino (1698–1735).

== Biography ==
Alessandro Carlo Gaetano Varano was born in Ferrara, Italy and ordained a priest on 22 June 1692. On 21 July 1698, he was appointed during the papacy of Pope Innocent XII as Bishop of Macerata e Tolentino. On 17 August 1698, he was consecrated bishop by Sebastiano Antonio Tanara, Cardinal-Priest of Santi Quattro Coronati, with Francesco Pannocchieschi d'Elci, Archbishop of Pisa, and Prospero Bottini, Titular Archbishop of Myra, serving as co-consecrators. He served as Bishop of Macerata e Tolentino until his death on 20 October 1735 .

== External links and additional sources ==
- Cheney, David M. "Diocese of Macerata–Tolentino–Recanati–Cingoli–Treia". Catholic-Hierarchy.org. (for Chronology of Bishops) ^{[self-published]}
- Chow, Gabriel. "Diocese of Macerata–Tolentino–Recanati–Cingoli–Treia (Italy)". GCatholic.org. (for Chronology of Bishops) ^{[self-published]}

Catholic Church titles
Preceded by Fabrizio Paolucci	Bishop of Macerata e Tolentino; 1698–1735	Succeeded by Ignazio Stelluti
