= Archdiocese of Ancona–Osimo =

Roman Catholic archdiocese in Italy

Coordinates: 43.6253°N 13.5101°E

Archdiocese of Ancona–Osimo Archidioecesis Anconitana-Auximana Archidiocesi di Ancona–Osimo

Catholic
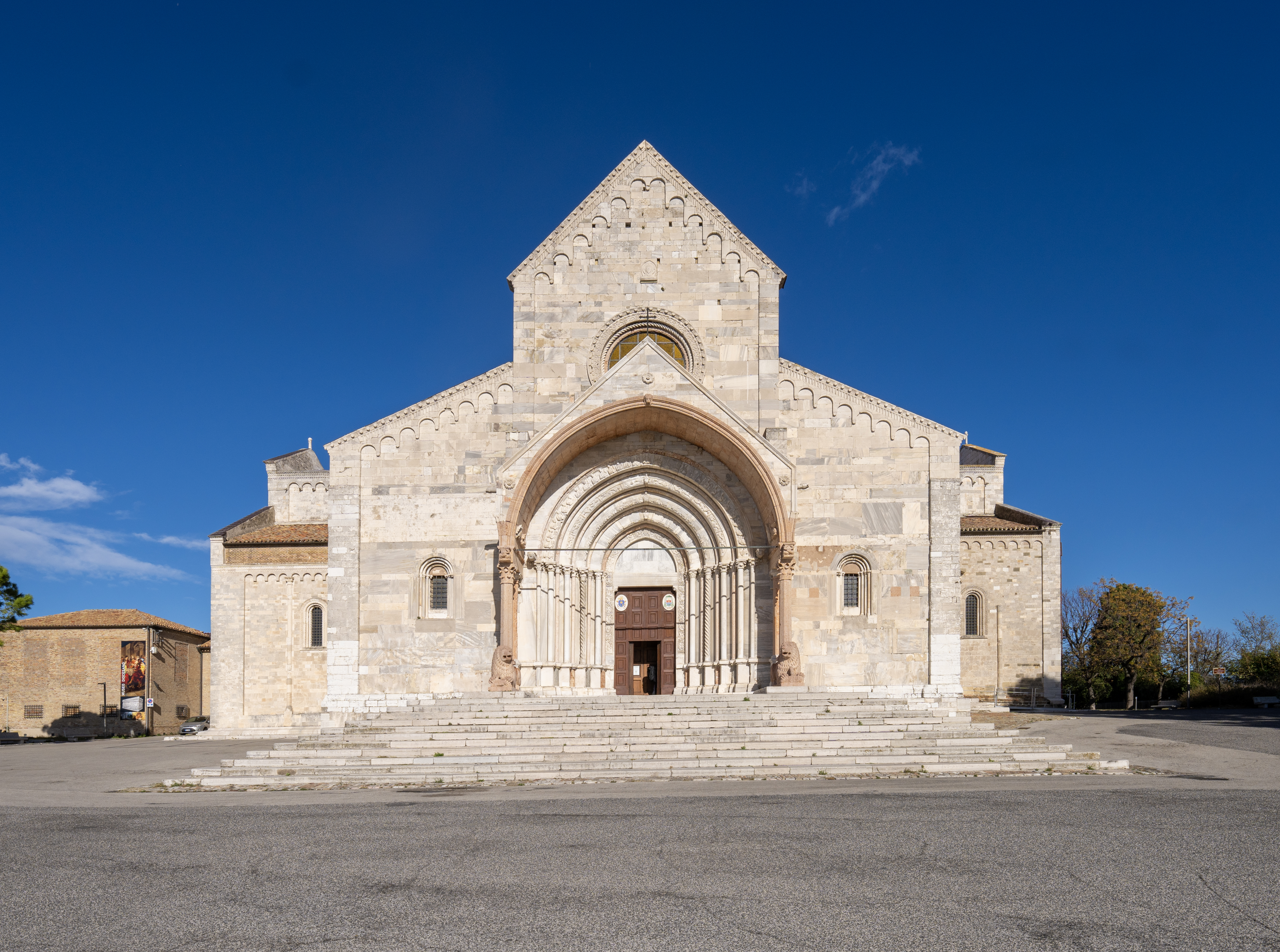
- Cathedral in Ancona

Location
- Country: Italy
- Ecclesiastical province: Ancona–Osimo

Statistics
- Area: 500 km^{2} (190 sq mi)
- Population: Total; Catholics: (as of 2018); 221,764; 207,708 (93.7%)
- Parishes: 72

Information
- Denomination: Catholic
- Sui iuris church: Latin Church
- Rite: Roman Rite
- Established: 3rd Century
- Cathedral: Basilica Cattedrale di S. Ciriaco
- Co-cathedral: Basilica Concattedrale di S. Leopardo
- Secular priests: 84 (diocesan); 49 (religious orders); 15 permanent deacons

Current leadership
- Pope: Leo XIV
- Archbishop: Angelo Spina

Map

Website
- diocesi.ancona.it

The Archdiocese of Ancona–Osimo (Latin: Archidioecesis Anconitana-Auximana) is a Latin Church ecclesiastical territory and metropolitan see of the Catholic Church in the Marche region of Italy.

It has existed in its present form since 1986, when the Archdiocese of Ancona was united with the historical Diocese of Osimo. Since earliest times, the diocese has been directly subject to the Holy See without intermediate authorities.

The archbishop has his episcopal throne in the Cathedral of Ancona, while the Cathedral of Osimo has the status of a co-cathedral.

In the 17th, 18th, and 19th centuries, the archbishop of Ancona was frequently a cardinal. One, Prospero Lambertini, became Pope Benedict XIV.

== History ==
On 19 October 1422, by virtue of the bull Ex supernae majestatis, Pope Martin V decreed the union of the diocese of Ancona and the diocese of Numana (Humana, Umana). Except for the title, the diocese of Numana was completely suppressed.

On 14 September 1904, the Consistorial Congregation of the Papal Curia issued a decree, which had been approved by Pope Pius X, elevating the diocese of Ancona-Numantia to the rank of archiepiscopal see, without any suffragans and with the status and geographical definition of the diocese unchanged. The decree also granted the archbishops the use of the pallium and the archiepiscopal cross, but only within the confines of their own diocese. Cardinal Achille Manara was continued as head of the archdiocese, now as archbishop.

On 15 August 1972, by the bull Qui apostolico officio, Pope Paul VI created the new ecclesiastical province of Ancona, and granted its archbishop the status of Metropolitan. The ecclesiastical province was assigned the suffragan dioceses of Jesi (Aesina) and Osimo (Auximana).

On 5 July 1975, having obtained the permission of Pope Paul VI, the Congregation of Bishops ordered that the title of the archdiocese should only be the Archdiocese of Ancona. The title of Numana was reserved, to become a titular bishopric.

The diocese of Ancona was united to the diocese of Osimo by a decree of the Congregation of Bishops on 30 September 1986. Its name was to be Archidioecesis Anconitana-Auximana. The seat of the diocese was to be in Ancona. The former cathedral in Osimo was to have the honorary title of co-cathedral, and its chapter was to be the Capitulum Concathedralis. There was to be only one episcopal curia, one seminary, one ecclesiastical tribunal; and all the clergy were to be incardinated in the diocese of Ancona–Osimo.

=== Cathedral and chapter ===
The cathedral of Ancona suffered considerable damage in World War I, when the Austrian navy bombarded the port of Ancona in May 1915.

In 816, the Emperor Louis the Pious held a council at Aix, at which it was ordered that Canons and Canonesses live together according to a set of rules (canons, regulae). In the Roman synod of Pope Eugene II of November 826, it was ordered that Canons live together in a cloister next to the church. In 876, the Council of Pavia decreed in Canon X that the bishops should enclose the Canons: uti episcopi in civitatibus suis proximum ecclesiae claustrum instituant, in quo ipsi cum clero secundum canonicam regulam Deo militent, et sacerdotes suos ad hoc constringant, ut ecclesiam non relinquant et alibi habitare praesumant.

The earliest history of the Chapter of S. Cyriaco is without documentation. In 1179, however, Pope Alexander III issued a bull, confirming the Archdeacon and his colleagues in the Chapter all the rights, privileges and property which they possessed. In the bull he mentions their right to offerings made at certain altars in the cathedral, which had been granted by Bishops Transbertus, Marcellinus and Bernardus. The Chapter was therefore in existence by the very end of the 11th century.

Bishop Gerardus fixed the maximum number of Canons in the cathedral Chapter at twelve. He then obtained a bull from Pope Honorius III in 1224 which confirmed his action. From early times there were three dignities: the Archdeacon, the Archpriest, and the Primicerius.

In 1622, the Chapter of the Cathedral of S. Cyriaco was composed of two dignities and twelve Canons. In 1710, in addition to the twelve Canons, there were four dignities: these included the Primicerius, the Archdeacon, and the Archpriest. In 1746, there were three dignities.

The Collegiate Church of S. Maria della Piazza in Ancona was also served by a Chapter, composed of a Provost and six Canons.

=== Synods ===
A diocesan synod was an irregularly held, but important, meeting of the bishop of a diocese and his clergy. Its purpose was (1) to proclaim generally the various decrees already issued by the bishop; (2) to discuss and ratify measures on which the bishop chose to consult with his clergy; (3) to publish statutes and decrees of the diocesan synod, of the provincial synod, and of the Holy See.

Bishop Luigi Galli (1622–1657) presided over a diocesan synod in Ancona in 1654. A diocesan synod was held by Cardinal Giannicolò Conti (1666–1698) on 4–5 November 1674.

Cardinal Marcello d'Aste (1700–1709) held a diocesan synod in Ancona in 1708; its Constitutions were published in 1738. Cardinal Giovanni Battista Bussi (1710–1726) presided over a diocesan synod in the cathedral at Ancona on 15–18 September 1726. Cardinal Bartolomeo Massei (1731–1745) held a diocesan synod in the cathedral of S. Cyriaco on 26–28 October 1738. Cardinal Giovanni Ottavio Bufalini (1766–1782) held a diocesan synod on 1–3 September 1779.

On 13–15 November 1883, Cardinal Achille Manara held a diocesan synod in the cathedral of Ancona.

== Bishops of Ancona ==
...
Judas Cyriacus ?
...
Primianus
...
[Marcus ?]
...

- Ignotus (attested 496)

...
Traso ( ? )
...

- Marcellinus (6th cent. ?)

...
[Thomas]
...

- Serenus (attested 598, 603)

...

- Maurosus (attested 649)

...

- Joannes (attested 680)

...

- Senator (attested 743)

...

- Tigrinus (attested 826)

...

- Leopardus (attested 869)
- Paulus (attested 873, 878, 880)

...

- Bolongerius (Benolegerius) (attested 887)

...

- Erfermarius (attested 967, 968)

...

- Traso (attested 996)
- Stephanus (c. 1020)

...

- Grimaldus (attested 1051)
- Gerardus (attested 1068)
- Transbertus
- Marcellinus
- Bernardus (attested 1128)
- Anonymus (attested 1146)
- Lambertus (menzionato nel 1150 or 1158)
- Thomas ? (c. 1172)
- Gentile (attested 1179)
- Rodolfus, O.S.B.Camald.
- Beroaldus (attested 1186–1192)

...

- Gerardus (attested 1204–1228)

...

- Persevallus (c. 1239–c. 1242)
- Joannes Bonus (1244– ? )
- Petrus Capocci
- Petrus Romanucci (1284 or earlier – 1286)
- Berardus de Podio (1286–1296)
- Pandulfus
- Nicolaus
- Thomas
- Nicolaus Rinonis
- Augustinus de Podio
- Lanfrancus Salvetti, O.Min.
- Joannes Tedeschi, O.E.S.A. (1349–1381)
- Bartholomaeus de Uliariis, O.S.B. (1381–1385)
- Guglielmo della Vigna, O.S.B. (1386–1405)
- Carolus de Actis de Saxoferrato, O.S.B. (1405–1406)
- Lorenzo de Ricci (1406–1410)
- Simone Vigilanti, O.E.S.A. (1410–1412)
- Pietro Liberotti (1412–1419)
- Astorgio Agnesi (1419–1436)

== Bishops of Ancona e Numana ==
United: 19 October 1422 with the Diocese of Numana

- Astorgius Agnesi
- Joannes Caffarelli (1437–1460)
- Agapitus Rustici-Cenci (1460–1463)
- Antonio Fatati (1463–1484)
- Benincasa di Benincasis (1484–1502)
- Giovanni Sacca (1502–1505) Administrator
- Card. Pietro Accolti (4 Apr 1505 – 5 Apr 1514 Resigned)
- Francesco Accolti (5 Apr 1514 – 1523 Resigned)
- Baldovinetto de' Baldovinetti (26 Mar 1523 – 1538 Died)
- Girolamo Ghianderoni (12 Nov 1538 – 1550 Resigned)
- Matteo Lucchi (1550–1556)
- Vincenzo Lucchi (6 Feb 1556 – 31 Jan 1585 Died)

Cardinal Alessandro Farnese (1585) Administrator

- Cardinal Carlo Conti (1585–1615)
- Giulio Savelli (11 Jan 1616 – 2 May 1622 Resigned)
- Luigi Galli (1622–1657)

Sede vacante (1657–1666)

- Card. Giannicolò Conti (29 Mar 1666 –1698)
- Card. Marcello d'Aste (1700–1709)
- Card. Giovanni Battista Bussi (1710–1726)
- Card. Prospero Lorenzo Lambertini (20 Jan 1727 –1731)
- Card. Bartolomeo Massei (1731–1745)
- Nicola Manciforte (1746–1762)
- Card. Filippo Acciaioli (1763–1766)
- Card. Giovanni Ottavio Bufalini (1766–1782)
- Card. Vincenzo Ranuzzi (14 Feb 1785 – 27 Oct 1800 Died)

Sede vacante (1800–1816)

- Card. Nicola Riganti (1816–1822)
- Card. Giovanni Francesco Falzacappa (1823–1824 Resigned)
- Card. Cesare Nembrini Pironi Gonzaga (1824–1837)
- Card. Antonio Maria Cadolini, B. (12 Feb 1838 – 1 Aug 1851 Died)
- Card. Antonio Benedetto Antonucci (5 Sep 1851 – 29 Jan 1879 Died)
- Card. Achille Manara (1879–1906 Died)

== Archbishops of Ancona e Numana ==
Title granted: 14 September 1904
Name changed: 5 July 1975 to: Anconitana-Numanensis

- Giovanni Battista Ricci (21 Jul 1906 – 10 Nov 1929 Died)
- Mario Giardini, B. (1931–1940 Resigned)
- Marco Giovanni Della Pietra, O.F.M. (25 Mar 1940 – 13 Jan 1945 Died)
- Egidio Bignamini (18 Nov 1945 – 21 Dec 1966 Died)
- Felicissimo Stefano Tinivella, O.F.M. (22 Feb 1967 – 6 Jul 1968 Resigned)
- Carlo Maccari (5 Aug 1968 – 1 Jul 1989 Retired)

== Archbishops of Ancona–Osimo ==
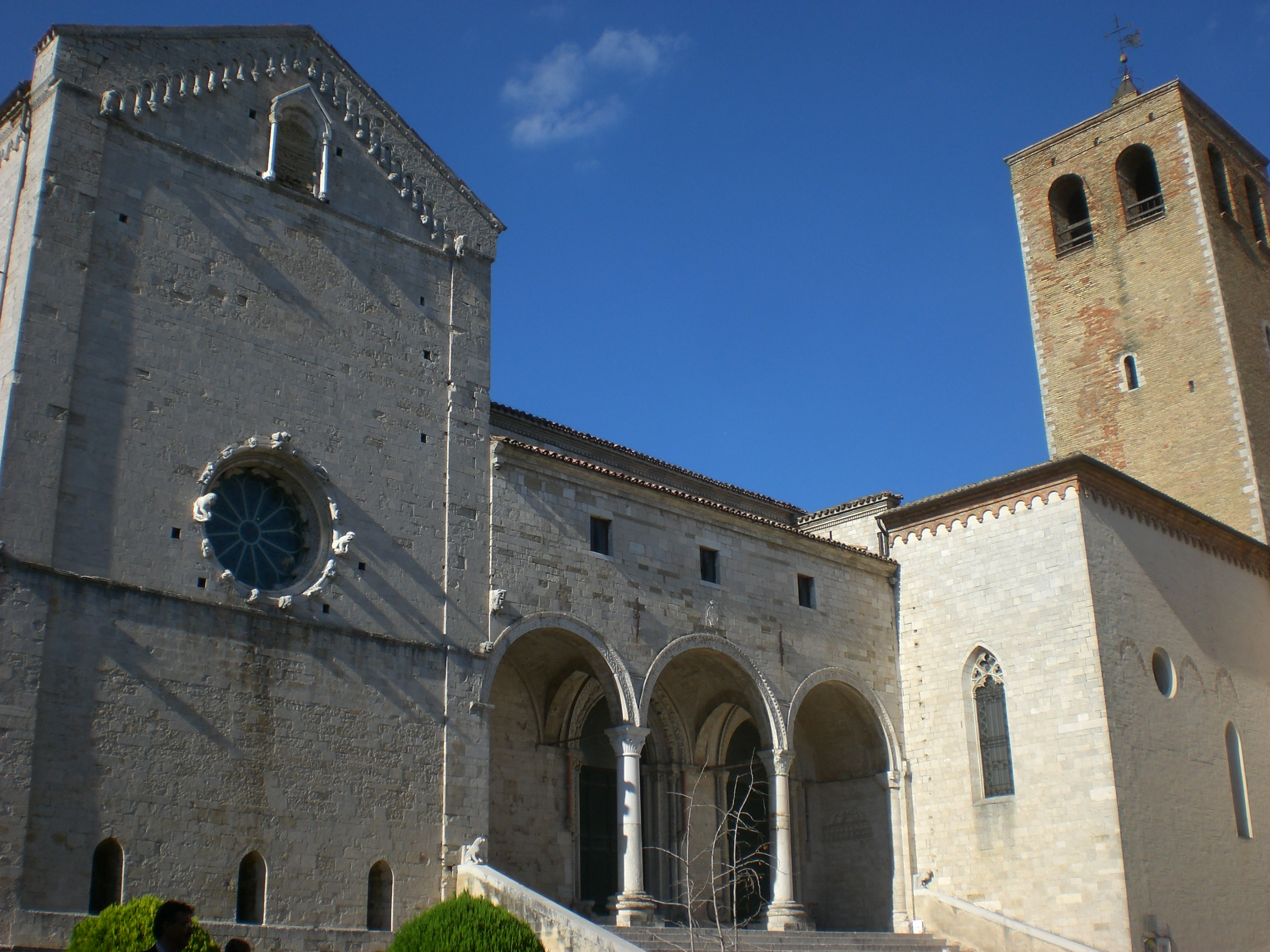
Co-cathedral in Osimo

United: 30 September 1986 with the Diocese of Osimo
Metropolitan See

- Card. Dionigi Tettamanzi (1989–1991)
- Franco Festorazzi (6 April 1991 – 8 January 2004 retired)
- Card. Edoardo Menichelli (8 January 2004 – 14 July 2017 retired)
- Angelo Spina (14 July 2017 ... )

== See also ==
- Roman Catholic Diocese of Osimo
- Roman Catholic Diocese of Osimo and Cingoli
- Timeline of Ancona

== Books ==
=== Reference works for bishops ===
- Gams, Pius Bonifatius (1873). Series episcoporum Ecclesiae catholicae: quotquot innotuerunt a beato Petro apostolo (in Latin). Ratisbon: Typis et Sumptibus Georgii Josephi Manz. pp. 664–666.
- Eubel, Conradus, ed. (1913). Hierarchia catholica (in Latin). Vol. Tomus 1 (second ed.). Münster: Libreria Regensbergiana. (in Latin)
- Eubel, Conradus, ed. (1914). Hierarchia catholica (in Latin). Vol. Tomus 2 (second ed.). Münster: Libreria Regensbergiana.
- Gulik, Guilelmus (1923). Eubel, Conradus (ed.). Hierarchia catholica (in Latin). Vol. Tomus 3 (second ed.). Münster: Libreria Regensbergiana.
- Gauchat, Patritius (Patrice) (1935). Hierarchia catholica. Vol. Tomus IV (1592-1667). Münster: Libraria Regensbergiana.
- Ritzler, Remigius; Sefrin, Pirminus (1952). Hierarchia catholica medii et recentis aevi. Vol. Tomus V (1667-1730). Patavii: Messagero di S. Antonio.
- Ritzler, Remigius; Sefrin, Pirminus (1958). Hierarchia catholica medii et recentis aevi. Vol. Tomus VI (1730-1799). Patavii: Messagero di S. Antonio.
- Ritzler, Remigius; Sefrin, Pirminus (1968). Hierarchia Catholica medii et recentioris aevi (in Latin). Vol. VII (1800–1846). Monasterii: Libreria Regensburgiana.
- Remigius Ritzler; Pirminus Sefrin (1978). Hierarchia catholica Medii et recentioris aevi (in Latin). Vol. VIII (1846–1903). Il Messaggero di S. Antonio.
- Pięta, Zenon (2002). Hierarchia catholica medii et recentioris aevi (in Latin). Vol. IX (1903–1922). Padua: Messagero di San Antonio. ISBN 978-88-250-1000-8.

=== Studies ===
- Cappelletti, Giuseppe (1848). Le chiese d'Italia: dalla loro origine sino ai nostri giorni (in Italian). Vol. Tomo settimo. Venezia: G. Antonelli. pp. 9–193.
- Colucci, Giuseppe (1791). Delle antichità picene dell'abate Giuseppe Colucci patrizio camerinese (in Italian). Vol. Tomo X. Fermo.
- Fraikin, J. (1914). Ancone, in: Dictionnaire d'Histoire et de Géographie ecclésiastiques, Tome deuxième (Paris: Letouzey 1914), pp. 1528–1537. (in French)
- Grimaldi, F. (1984), "I vescovi di Numana, secoli V–XII. Cronotassi critica," in" Studia Picena, n. 49, 1984, pp. 35–41. (in Italian)
- Kehr, Paul Fridolin (1909). Italia pontificia Vol. IV (Berlin: Weidmann 1909), pp. 194–199. (in Latin)
- Lanzoni, Francesco (1927). Le diocesi d'Italia dalle origini al principio del secolo VII (an. 604). Faenza: F. Lega, pp. 381–389. (in Italian)
- Natalucci, Mario (1938). Il tesoro e l'archivio della Cattedrale di Ancona. Ancona: Stabilimento Tipografico Pucci, 1938. (in Italian)
- Natalucci, Mario (1960). Ancona attraverso i secoli: Dalle origini alla fine del Quaitrocento (in Italian). Città di Castello: Unione arti grafiche.
- Natalucci, Mario (1960). Ancona attraverso i secoli: Dell'inizio del Cinquecento alla fine del Settecento (in Italian). Citta di Castello: Unione arti grafiche.
- Natalucci, Mario (1960). Ancona attraverso i secoli: Dal periodo napoleonico al nostri glorni (in Italian). Città di Castello: Unione arti grafiche.
- Peruzzi, Agostino (1835). Storia d'Ancona dalla sua fondazione all'anno MDXXXII (in Italian). Vol. secondo. Pesaro: Nobili.
- Peruzzi, Agostino (1845). L. Pauri e di S. Petrelli (ed.). La Chiesa anconitana, dissertazione (in Italian). Vol. Parte prima. Ancona: Gustavo Sartorij Cherubini.
- Schwartz, Gerhard (1907). Die Besetzung der Bistümer Reichsitaliens unter den sächsischen und salischen Kaisern: mit den Listen der Bischöfe, 951-1122. Leipzig: B.G. Teubner. pp. 240–241. (in German)
- Ughelli, Ferdinando; Coleti, Niccolò (1717). Italia sacra, sive De Episcopis Italiae (in Latin). Vol. Tomus primus (secunda ed.). Venice: apud Sebastianum Coleti. pp. 324–342.
