= Dalmau Moner =

Spanish Roman Catholic priest

Blessed Dalmau Moner OP
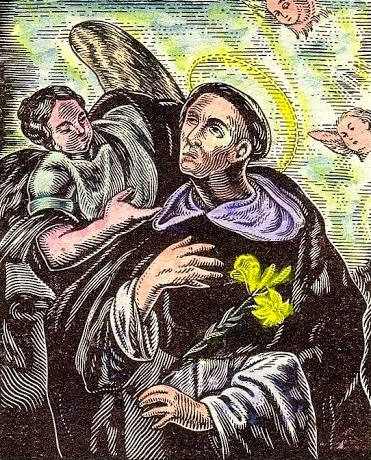

Priest
- Born: 1291; Santa Coloma de Farners, Girona, Crown of Aragon
- Died: 24 September 1341; Girona, Crown of Aragon
- Venerated in: Roman Catholic Church
- Beatified: 13 August 1721, Saint Peter's Basilica, Papal States by Pope Innocent XIII
- Feast: 24 September
- Attributes: Dominican habit

Dalmau Moner (1291 - 24 September 1341) was a Spanish Roman Catholic priest and a professed member of the Order of Preachers from Girona. Moner lived a humble life of solitude at his convent in Girona and later lived a period in France in a cave before being summoned back to Girona where he later died.

His beatification received formal ratification from Pope Innocent XIII on 13 August 1721 after the latter confirmed the late friar's local 'cultus' - or popular devotion.

== Life ==
Dalmau Moner was born in 1291 in San Coloma de Farnès in Catalonia to a wealthy family. He completed his studies in the nearby Augustinian monastery of Sant Pere Cercada, from which he was sent to Gerona to study the liberal arts.

He became a professed member of the Order of Preachers in Girona at the age of fifteen in 1306. Afterwards he lived in a shy way, quietly carrying out his usual duties, mainly teaching, which he carried out for years, as well as becoming master of novices. In 1308 he went to Montpellier to study logic. In 1314 he went to Valencia to study philosophy, later to Barcelona and again Montpellier. He thus obtained the title of Doctor of Theology. In the meantime he had already taught logic in other Dominican monasteries – in Castelló d'Empúries, Tarragona, La Seu d'Urgell and Cervera.

Moner never wore a habit that was not in tatters and he picked up items of clothing from his fellow friars that were worn out and wore them as both an act of humility and penance. The friar never consumed fish or eggs and he instead lived on a diet of unseasoned vegetables and hard bread though he added a few ashes to such meals during each Lent. He also slept on bare earth and he often visited a local church to reflect and take an occasional nap in which he rested his head on the altar step.

On one occasion a novice tempted to leave the order received a visit from Moner who convinced him otherwise and saw the novice remain in the order and on another occasion refused to help a mother heal her child of a serious sight disease after he said the disease would save him from serious sin and that God would decide the right time for the child to be healed. Moner did not speak to women much though when he did he turned his back to them and spoke over his shoulder. He was also commissioned to found a convent in Castellón de Ampurias and after its construction returned to Girona in 1331.

Moner had a great devotion to Mary Magdalene, and at one pont made a pilgrimage to Marseille to a cave where she purportedly had once lived. Feeling great attraction for the penitent life, upon returning to his convent in Gerona, he built himself a cave in the garden and retired there alone to practice the eremitic life, emerging from isolation only for the Eucharistic celebration and for the common acts of conventual life. In 1336 he obtained permission to retire to a hermit's life in the cave of Saint Magdalene, in Saint-Maximin-la-Sainte-Baume in Provence. After a few months, he was recalled to Gerona.

He died on 24 September 1341 and his remains were interred in Girona.

== Beatification ==
Moner's beatification received official approval from Pope Innocent XIII on 13 August 1721 after the pontiff ratified a decree that confirmed the late friar's local 'cultus' - otherwise known as popular and enduring veneration to him. According to the lessons of his Office, he was known as "the brother who speaks with angels".
