= Nazzareno Marconi =

His Excellency Nazzareno Marconi
- Bishop of Macerata-Tolentino-Recanati-Cingoli-Treia
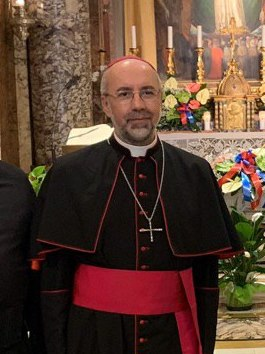
- Church: Roman Catholic Church
- Diocese: Macerata-Tolentino-Recanati-Cingoli-Treia
- Installed: 13 July 2014
- Predecessor: Claudio Giuliodori

Orders
- Ordination: 2 July 1983
- Consecration: 13 July 2014 by Gualtiero Bassetti

Personal details
- Born: Nazzareno Marconi; 12 February 1958 (age 68) Città di Castello, Umbria
- Motto: Dabis servo tuo cor docile
- Coat of arms

Styles of Nazzareno Marconi
- Reference style: His Excellency
- Spoken style: Your Excellency
- Religious style: Bishop

Nazzareno Marconi (born 12 February 1958) is the bishop of Macerata-Tolentino-Recanati-Cingoli-Treia. He had previously served as clergy of the diocese of Città di Castello, being pastor of San Donato parish.

Marconi was born in Città di Castello, Perugia. He entered the Pontifical Roman Seminary to become a priest. He earned a BA in philosophy from the Pontifical Lateran University and a STB in theology from the Pontifical Gregorian University. He was ordained a priest for the diocese of Città di Castello on 2 July 1983.

After his ordination he went on to earn a Licence in Sacred Scripture from the Pontifical Biblical Institute in Rome. He ended his studies at the Pontifical Urbaniana University earned a doctorate in theology. During the period of study was chosen for a number of years as an educator at the Pontifical Roman Seminary.

After the experience of Assistant Pastor at St. Justin, in September 1988 he was appointed parish priest of St. Michael the Archangel in Citerna (PG). In the diocese has held numerous positions, including that of Director of the Catechetical Office docesano. At the same time is chosen as the religious and biblical counselor for film and multimedia RAI-Italian Radiotelevisone. Since 1988 teaches Exegesis of the Old Testament at the Theological Institute of Assisi. From 2004 to 2012 he was Rector of the Regional Seminary Umbro "Pius XI." On 10 March 2005 he was awarded the title of Chaplain of His Holiness.

From September 2013 until 2014 he was pastor of the parish of San Donato in Trestina. He was ordained a bishop on 13 July 2014.
