= Roman Catholic Diocese of Tolentino =

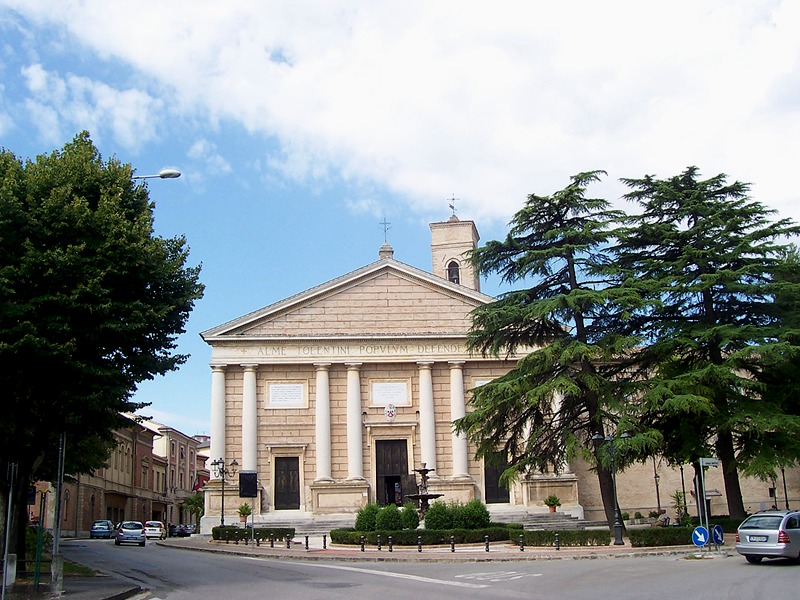
Parish church of San Catervo, Tolentino

The Diocese of Tolentino was a Roman Catholic diocese in Italy in the fifth century and early sixth century. The name of the diocese was revived, and its territory added to the Diocese of Macerata-Tolentino in 1586 by Pope Sixtus V.

== Bishops ==
Only two names are known:

- Probianus. The name occurs only on an inscription on the sarcophagus of Flavius Julius Catervius and his wife Septimia Severina, now in the co-cathedral of S. Catervo in Tolentino, which is variously said to belong to a date from the first to the fifth century. The inscription records that Probianus had baptised the deceased: quos Dei sacerdos Probianus lavit et unxit. Though he is only called a priest (sacerdos), it has been pointed out that the word can also refer to a bishop in the 4th and 5th century. The inscription does not name a diocese, assuming that Probianus was a bishop.
- Basilius, who is attested as a participant in the Roman synods of 487, 495, 499, and 502.

== See also ==
- Roman Catholic Diocese of Macerata-Tolentino-Recanati-Cingoli-Treia

== Bibliography ==
- Lanzoni, Francesco (1927). Le diocesi d'Italia dalle origini al principio del secolo VII (an. 604). Faenza: F. Lega, pp. 390–392. (in Italian)
- Cappelletti, Giuseppe (1845). Le chiese d'Italia (in Italian). Vol. terzo. Venice: G. Antonelli. pp. 687–697, 698–705.
