= Osimo Cathedral =

Church in Osimo, Italy

Coordinates: 43.4863°N 13.4805°E

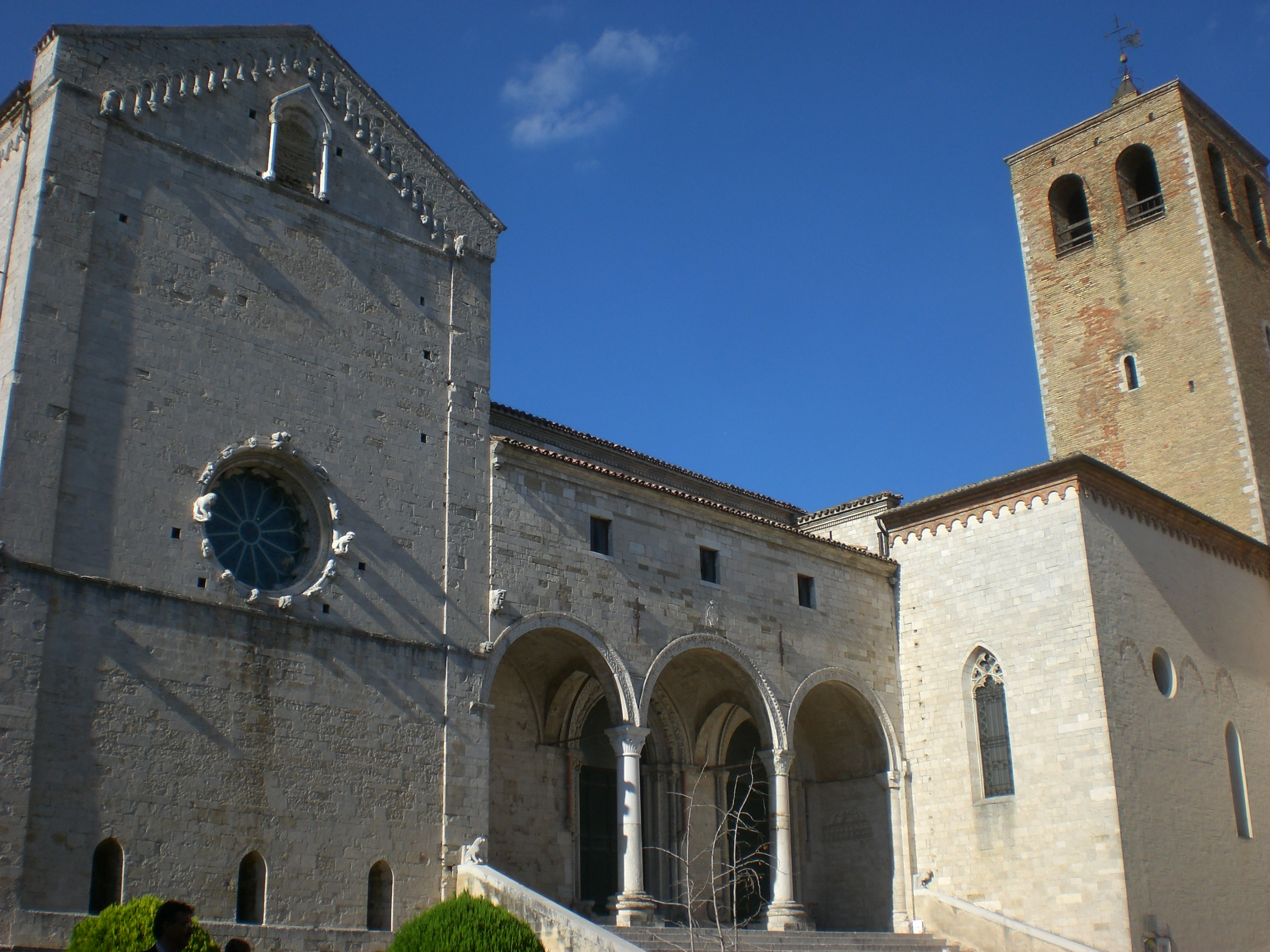
Facade and portico of Church

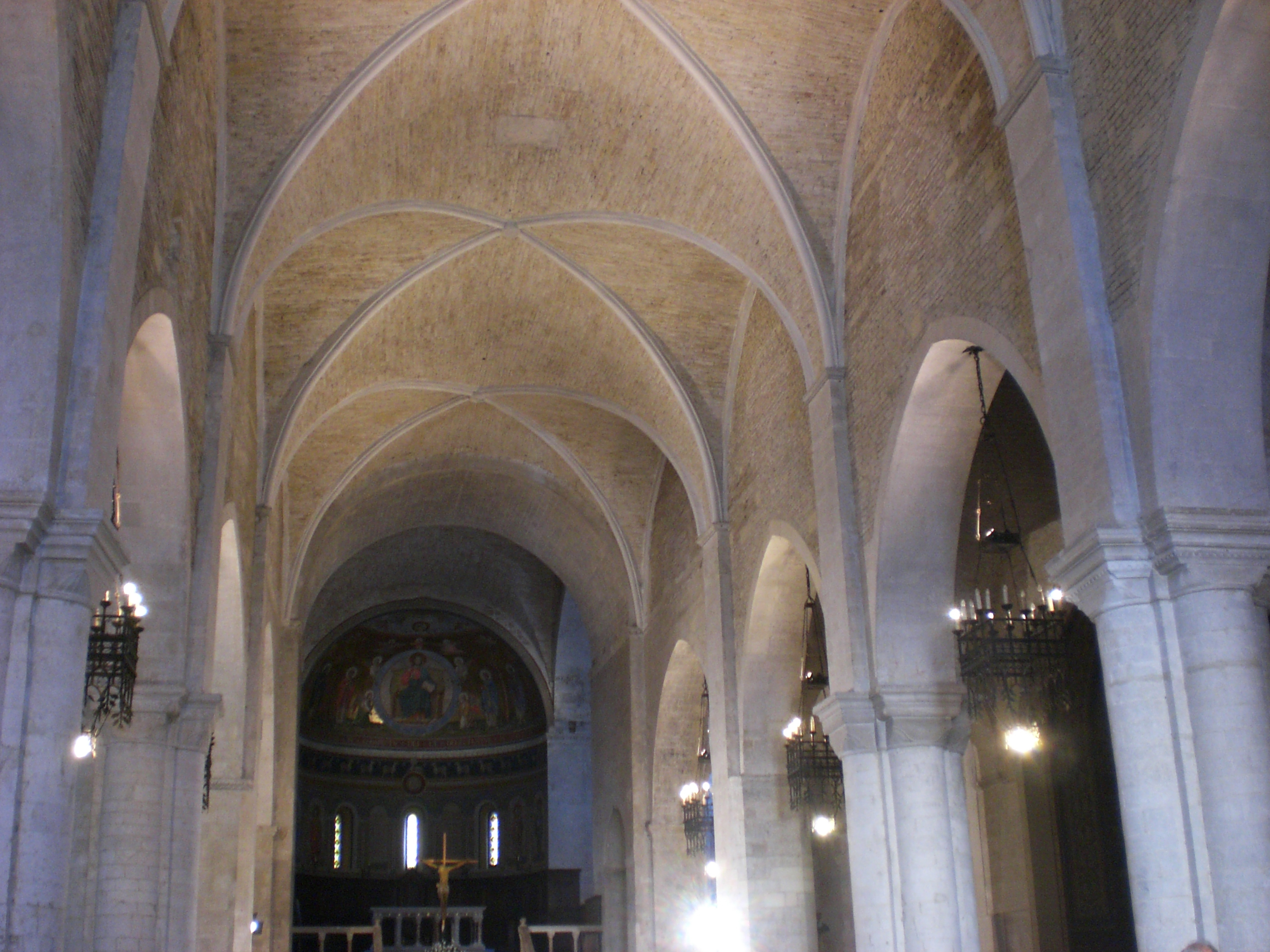
Interior view

Osimo Cathedral or the Church of San Leopardo (Italian: Concattedrale di Osimo, Chiesa di San Leopardo) is the principal church of Osimo in Italy, dedicated to the first bishop, Saint Leopardus. Formerly the episcopal seat of the Diocese of Osimo, it has been since 1986 a co-cathedral of the Archdiocese of Ancona-Osimo.

== History ==
The presbytery was built in around 1200 and has crypt beneath. At the end of the 13th century. In 1393, the building was partially destroyed in a fire.

== See also ==
- Roman Catholic Archdiocese of Ancona-Osimo
