= San Pietro Apostolo, Civitanova Marche =

Roman Catholic church in Marche, Italy

Coordinates: 43°18′24″N 13°43′45″E

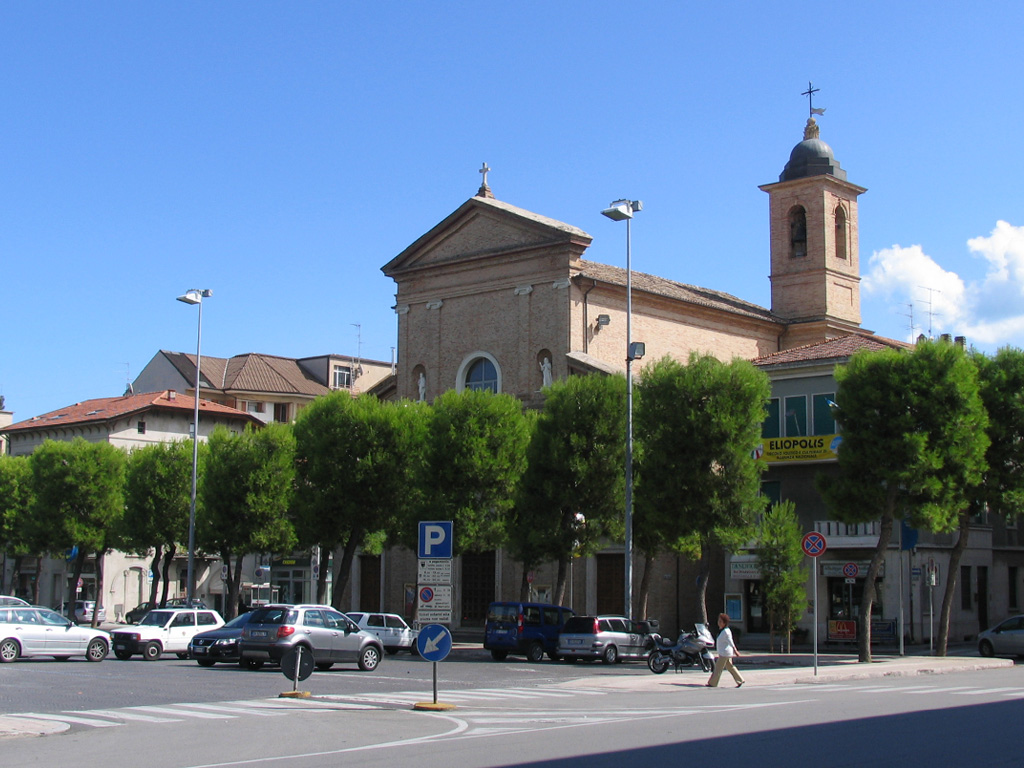

San Pietro Apostolo, formerly known as Santi Pietro e Marone, is a Roman Catholic church located in the lower town of Civitanova Marche, in the province of Macerata, region of Marche, Italy.

== History ==
The present church was rebuilt in Neoclassical style between 1841 and 1853, and served as the parish church of the lower town, Porto Civitanova. Restored in the 1990s, the facade has statues of both St Peter and St Marone on the second story. The brick frontage has elegant portals and ionic pilaster capitals in white stone. The main altar has a canvas depicting the Vergine della Misericordia.
