= Bernardino de Cupis (bishop) =

Italian Roman Catholic prelate

Most Reverend Bernardino de Cupis
- Bishop Emeritus of Osimo
- Church: Catholic Church
- Diocese: Diocese of Osimo
- In office: 1551–1574
- Predecessor: Cipriano Senili
- Successor: Cornelio Firmano

Bernardino de Cupis was an Italian Roman Catholic prelate who served as Bishop of Osimo (1551–1574).

== Biography ==
On 24 Aug 1551, he was appointed during the papacy of Pope Julius III as Bishop of Osimo. He served as Bishop of Osimo until his resignation in 1574.

While bishop, he was the principal co-consecrator of Angelo Cesi (bishop of Todi), Bishop of Todi (1566); and Girolamo Simoncelli, Bishop of Orvieto (1573).

Catholic Church titles
Preceded by Cipriano Senili	Bishop of Osimo; 1551–1574	Succeeded by Cornelio Firmano
