= Diocese of Macerata-Tolentino =

Roman Catholic diocese in Italy (1586-1986)

Coordinates: 43°18′03″N 13°27′24″E

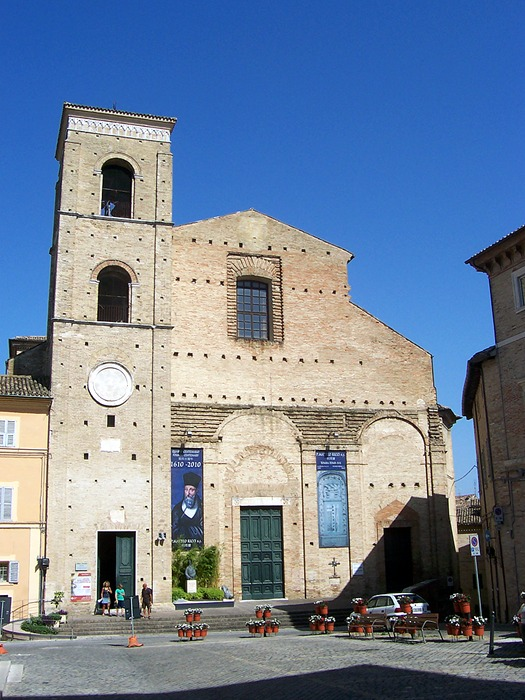
Cathedral of Macerata

The Diocese of Macerata-Tolentino was a Roman Catholic diocese in Italy founded in 1586 from a merger of the Diocese of Macerata and the Diocese of Tolentino. In 1986 it became the Diocese of Macerata-Tolentino-Recanati-Cingoli-Treia
