= Pietro di Domenico =

Italian painter

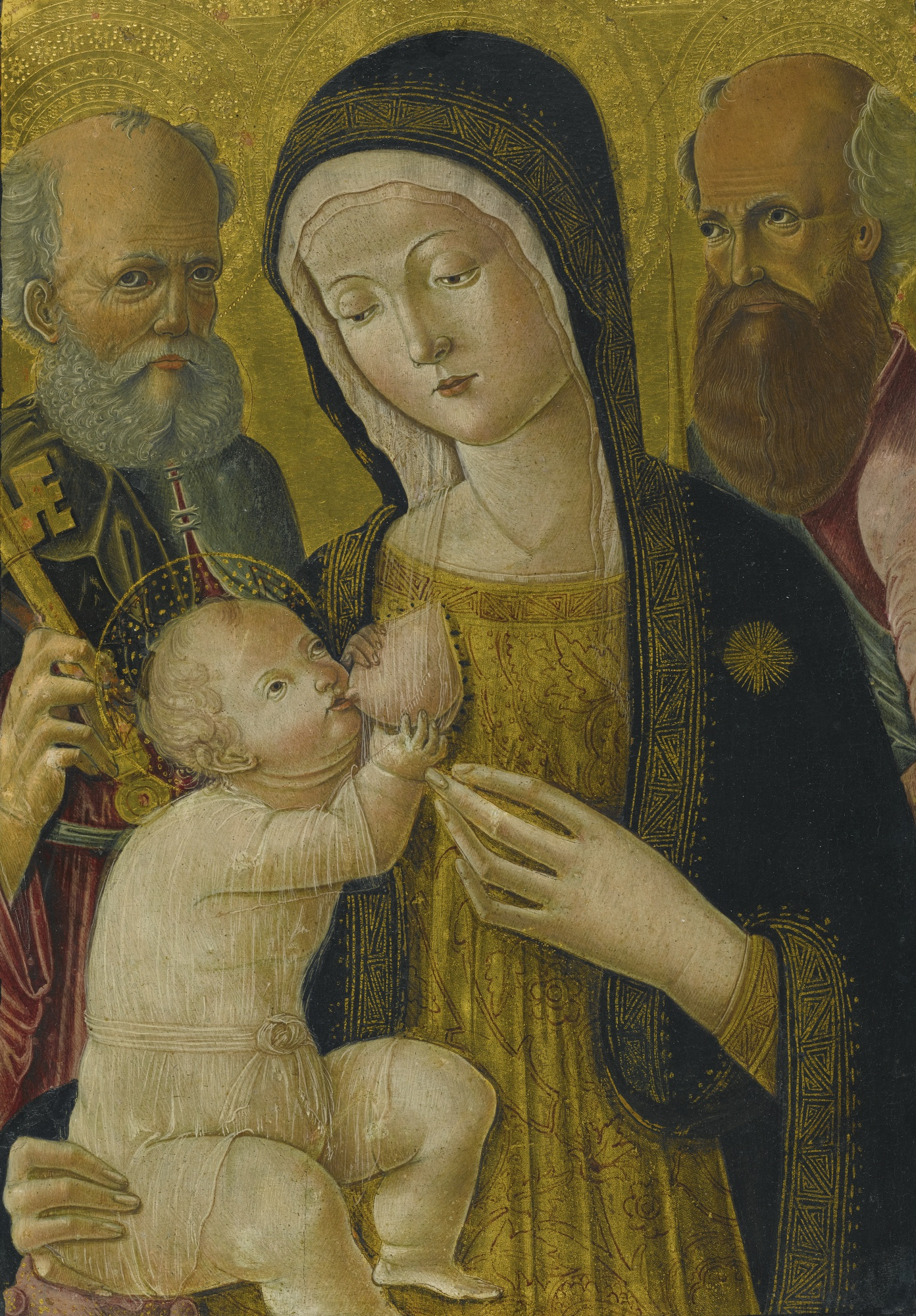
Madonna and Child with Saints Peter and Paul by Pietro di Domenico, private collection

Pietro di Domenico, also Pietro di Domenico da Siena, (1457–1506) was an Italian Renaissance painter.

Not much is known about Pietro di Domenico's life except through his works. He was born, worked, and lived all his life in Siena, and his style puts him in the Sienese School, and shows influences of the painter Luca Signorelli. He primarily painted religious-themed works for local church commissions. He died in Siena in 1506. One of his works is part of the York Museums Trust collection.
