= Pope Innocent XIII =

Head of the Catholic Church from 1721 to 1724

- Bishop of Rome
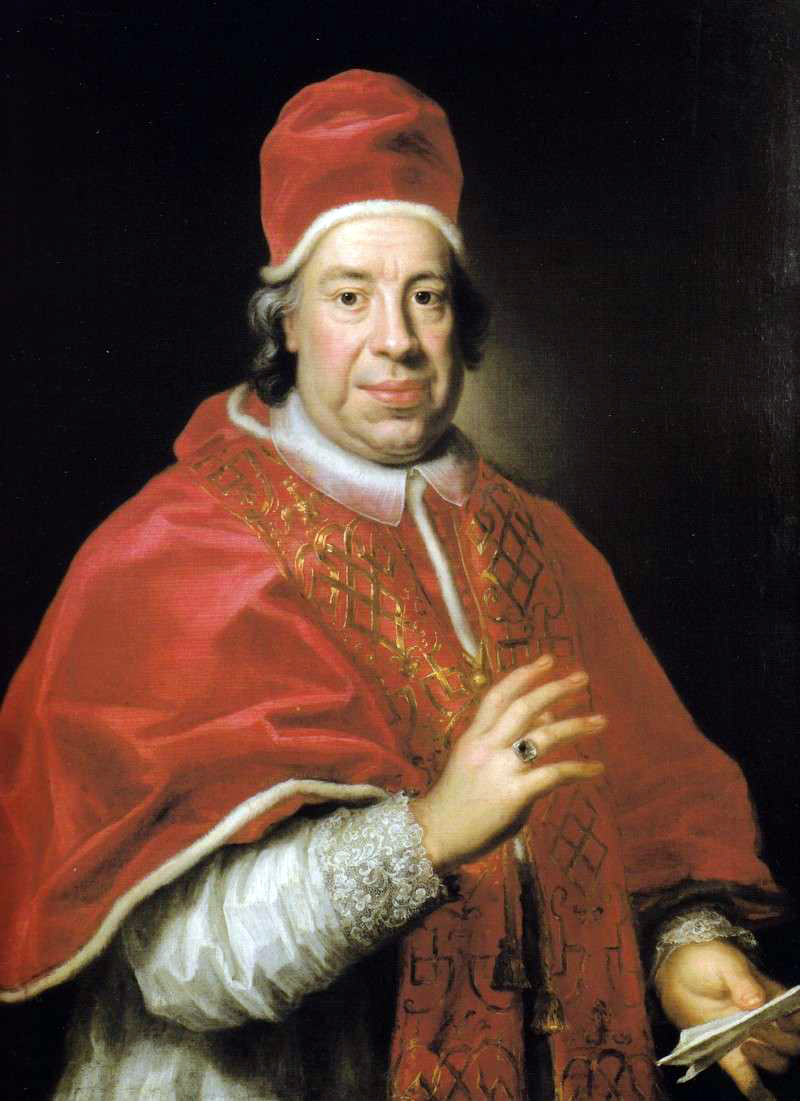
- Portrait of Innocent XIII c. 1722
- Church: Catholic Church
- Papacy began: 8 May 1721
- Papacy ended: 7 March 1724
- Predecessor: Clement XI
- Successor: Benedict XIII
- Previous posts: Titular Archbishop of Tarsus (1695–1706); Apostolic Nuncio to Switzerland (1695–1698); Apostolic Nuncio to Portugal (1698–1706); Cardinal-Priest of Santi Quirico e Giulitta (1706–1721); Archbishop of Osimo (1709–1712); Archbishop of Viterbo e Tuscania (1712–1719); Camerlengo of the Sacred College of Cardinals (1716–1717)

Orders
- Ordination: c. 1690
- Consecration: 16 June 1695 by Galeazzo Marescotti
- Created cardinal: 7 June 1706 by Clement XI

Personal details
- Born: Michelangelo dei Conti; 13 May 1655 Poli, Papal States
- Died: 7 March 1724 (aged 68) Rome, Papal States
- Buried: Vatican Grottoes, St. Peter's Basilica
- Coat of arms

Papal styles of Pope Innocent XIII
- Reference style: His Holiness
- Spoken style: Your Holiness
- Religious style: Holy Father
- Posthumous style: None

Pope Innocent XIII (Latin: Innocentius XIII; Italian: Innocenzo XIII; 13 May 1655 – 7 March 1724), born as Michelangelo dei Conti, was head of the Catholic Church and leader of the Papal States from 8 May 1721 to his death in March 1724. He remains the most recent pope to take the pontifical name "Innocent".

Pope Innocent XIII was reform-oriented, and imposed new standards of frugality, abolishing excessive spending. He took steps to end the practice of nepotism by issuing a decree which forbade his successors from granting land, offices or income to any relatives – something opposed by many cardinals who hoped they might become pope and benefit their families.

== Biography ==
=== Early life ===
Michelangelo dei Conti was born on 13 May 1655 in Poli, near Rome as the son of Carlo II, Duke of Poli, and Isabella d'Monti. Like Pope Innocent III (1198–1216), Pope Gregory IX (1227–1241) and Pope Alexander IV (1254–1261), he was a member of the aristocratic landowning family of the Conti, who held the titles of counts and dukes of Segni. He included the family shield in his pontifical coats of arms.

Conti commenced his studies in Ancona and then with the Jesuits in Rome at the Collegio Romano and then later at La Sapienza University. After he received his doctorate in canon law and civil law, he was ordained to the priesthood. Conti also served as the Referendary of the Apostolic Signatura in 1691, later to be appointed as the Governor of Ascoli until 1692. Conti was also the Governor of Campagna and Marittima from 1692 to 1693 and the Governor of Viterbo from 1693 to 1695.

Pope Innocent XII selected Conti as the Titular Archbishop of Tarsus on 13 June 1695 and he received his episcopal consecration on 16 June 1695 in Rome. Conti was also the nuncio to both Switzerland and Portugal.

=== Cardinalate ===
On 7 June 1706, Conti was elevated to the cardinalate under Pope Clement XI (1700–21) and was made the Cardinal-Priest of Santi Quirico e Giulitta. His appointment came about as the replacement of Gabriele Filippucci who resigned the cardinalate. He would receive his titular church on 23 February 1711. From 1697 to 1710 he acted as papal nuncio to the Kingdom of Portugal, where he is believed to have formed those unfavourable impressions of the Jesuits which afterwards influenced his conduct towards them. While in Portugal, he was witness to Father Bartolomeu de Gusmão's early aerostat experiments.

He was also transferred to Osimo as its archbishop in 1709 and was later translated one last time to Viterbo e Toscanella in 1712. He resigned his position in his diocese due to illness in 1719.

== Pontificate ==
=== Papal election ===
After the death of Pope Clement XI in 1721, a conclave was called to choose a new pope. It took 75 ballots just to reach a decision and choose Conti as the successor of Clement XI. After all candidates seemed to slip, support turned to Conti. The curial factions also turned their attention to him. His high reputation for ability, learning, purity, and a kindly disposition secured his election, which occurred the morning of 8 May 1721. He chose the name of Innocent XIII in honor of Pope Innocent III. On the following 18 May, he was solemnly crowned by the protodeacon, Cardinal Benedetto Pamphili.

=== Actions ===
His pontificate was prosperous, but comparatively uneventful. He held two consistories that saw three new cardinals elevated on 16 June 1721 and 16 July 1721.

The Chinese Rites controversy that started under his predecessor continued during his reign. Innocent XIII prohibited the Jesuits from prosecuting their mission in China, and ordered that no new members should be received into the order. This indication of his sympathies encouraged some French bishops to approach him with a petition for the recall of the papal bull Unigenitus by which Jansenism had been condemned; the request, however, was peremptorily denied.

The Pope also assisted Hospitaller Malta in its struggles against the Barbary pirates.

Innocent XIII, like his predecessor, showed much favour to James Francis Edward Stuart, the "Old Pretender" to the British throne and liberally supported him. The pope's cousin, Francesco Maria Conti, from Siena, became chamberlain of James' little court in the Roman Muti Palace.

==== Consistories ====
Innocent XIII held two consistories in which he named three cardinals. One of those new cardinals was his own brother, Bernardo Maria.

==== Beatifications ====
Innocent XIII beatified three individuals during his pontificate: John of Nepomuk (31 May 1721), Dalmazio Moner (13 August 1721), and Andrea dei Conti (11 December 1723).

==== Doctor of the Church ====
On 25 April 1722, he named Saint Isidore of Seville as a Doctor of the Church.

== Death and legacy ==
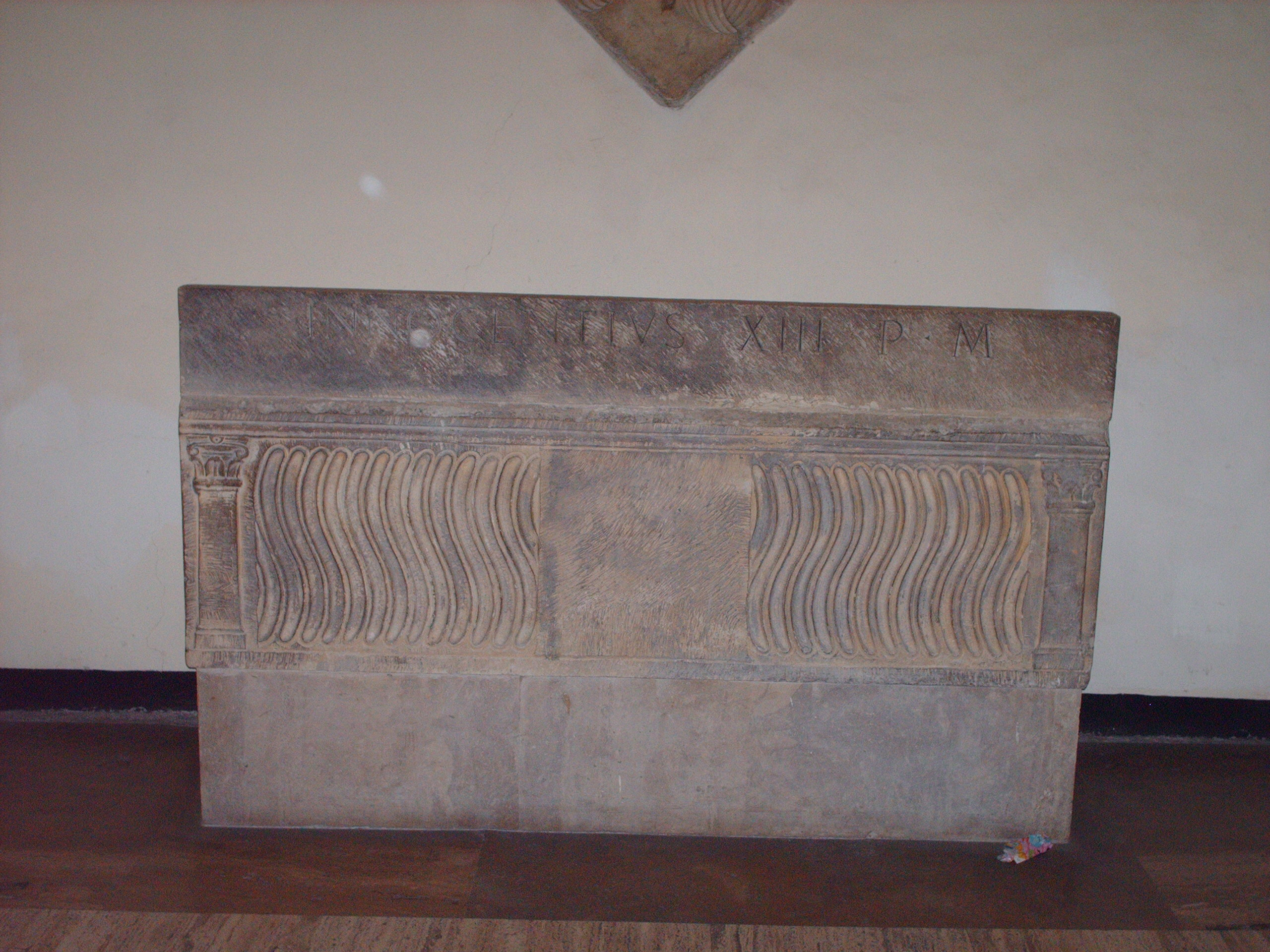
The tomb of Pope Innocent XIII.

Innocent XIII fell ill in 1724. He was tormented by a hernia of which he spoke to nobody but his valet. At one point, it had burst and caused inflammation and fever. Innocent XIII asked for the last rites, made his profession of faith, and died on 7 March 1724, at the age of 68. His pontificate was unremarkable, given that he was hampered by physical suffering. He was interred in the grotto at Saint Peter's Basilica.

Innocent XIII might have lived a few years longer had he been more temperate in eating and drinking, and had his doctors been less ignorant. He was an equitable, honest ruler, always kept his word, in fact was inclined to do more than he had promised. He proved grateful to those who had befriended him, a rare quality indeed. He gave few audiences and compared to Clement XI showed little interest in the Pretender [James Edward Stuart]. I will have reliable correspondents in the coming conclave who will warn me in good time if any intrigues are afoot which might prejudice the King's interests by favouring the Pretender's.

— John Walton, letter addressed to Lord Carteret in March 1724.

Innocent XIII had suffered from a hernia about three to four months after his election but also suffered from acute attacks of pain due to kidney stones. But Innocent XIII did himself no favors with his excessive appetite and no exercise. He also suffered from lethargy that caused him to sleep a great deal. In mid-February 1724, his suffering grew worse to the point that he could no longer get up, suffering from an accumulation of water in his lower limbs in what was an indication of severe kidney problems. This led to his doctors fearing that he could develop congestive heart failure. On 3 March, despite his failing health, Innocent XIII set to work signing documents, though he suffered poor sleep that night and had a better day on 4 March. In the morning on 5 March, one of the papal doctors fed Innocent XIII a purgative, however, this backfired and only aggravated the hernia. An attempted reduction was only partially successful, resulting in a strangulated hernia, while the pope experienced great pain in the night between 5 and 6 March. However, a serious inflammation quickly set in, causing the pope to contract a fever. Innocent XIII, now very well aware of his state of health, immediately asked for the Viaticum, receiving it on 6 March as his family gathered to see him. However, there had been attempts to get the pope to name new cardinals, simply to create stronger factions in the conclave. At 4:00pm on 6 March, he signed a codicil to his will, and that night asked for and received the Extreme Unction. Innocent XIII died on 7 March.

== See also ==
- Cardinals created by Innocent XIII
- Apostolici Ministerii
- List of popes

== Sources ==
- Guy, Basil (1986). Domestic Correspondence of Dominique-Marie Varlet, Bishop of Babylon (1678-1742). E.J. Brill. ISBN 90-04-07671-9.
- Fiorani, Luigi (1994). "Innocent XIII". In Levillain, Philippe; O'Malley, John W. (eds.). The Papacy. Vol. 2: Gaius-Proxies. Routledge. pp. 809–810.
- Williams, George L. (1998). Papal Genealogy: The Families and Descendants of the Popes. McFarland & Company, Inc.

Catholic Church titles
Preceded by Clement XI	Pope; 8 May 1721 – 7 March 1724	Succeeded by Benedict XIII
