= Osimo =

- Comune
- Comune di Osimo
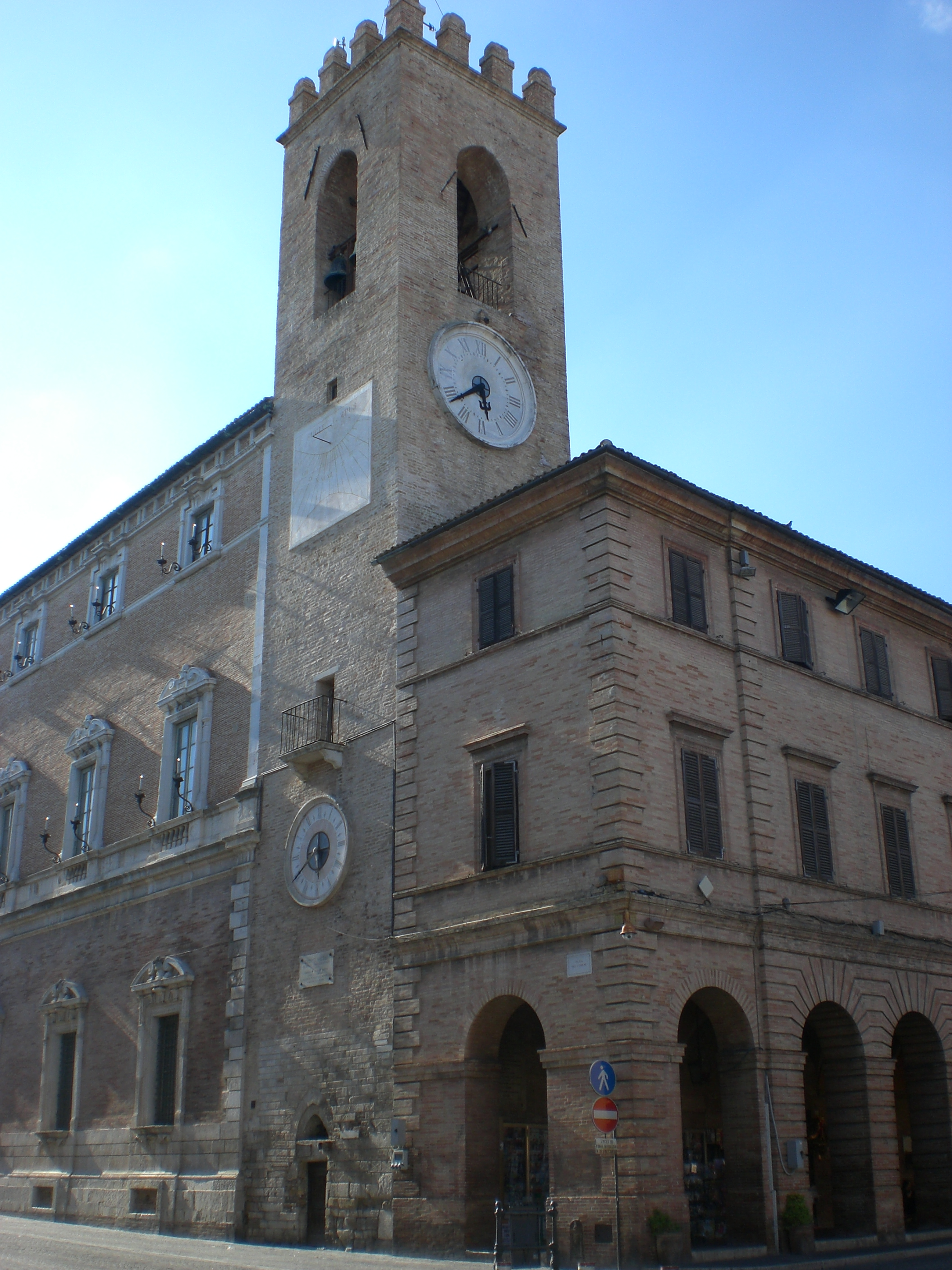
- Belfry and city hall

- Location within Italy Location within Marche
- Coordinates: 43°29′N 13°29′E
- Country: Italy
- Region: Marche
- Province: Ancona (AN)
- Frazioni: Osimo Stazione, Passatempo, Casenuove, Campocavallo, Padiglione, Abbadia, San Paterniano, Santo Stefano, San Biagio, Santa Paolina

Government
  - Mayor: Michela Glorio (Centre-left coalition)

Area
  - Total: 106 km^{2} (41 sq mi)
- Elevation: 265 m (869 ft)

Population (2018-01-01)
  - Total: 35,071
  - Density: 331/km^{2} (857/sq mi)
- Demonym: Osimani
- Time zone: UTC+1 (CET)
  - Summer (DST): UTC+2 (CEST)
- Postal code: 60027
- Dialing code: 071
- Patron saint: St. Joseph of Cupertino
- Saint day: September 18
- Website: Official website

Osimo is a town and comune of the Marche region of Italy, in the province of Ancona. The municipality covers a hilly area located approximately 15 kilometres (9.3 mi) south of the port city of Ancona and the Adriatic Sea.

== History ==
Flag of Osimo

Coat of Arms of Osimo

The oldest archaeological evidence attested in the territory of Osimo comes from the lower valley of the Musone river and its right tributary Fiumicello, which date back to the Upper Paleolithic (40,000-12,000 years ago).

In the 9th century BC, the Picentes settled on the hill of Osimo and on the peak of Monte San Pietro, giving life to two distinct settlements with relative necropolises.

With the Battle of Sentinum (today Sassoferrato) in 295 BC, the Romans began the conquest of Picenum region, which involved Osimo starting from 173 BC.

Vetus Auximum – the ancient Osimo – was founded by the ancient Romans, who used it as a fortress for their settlement in northern Picenum. The walls were made of large rectangular stones which are still visible in some locations. It became a Roman colony in 157 BC. The family of Pompey were its protectors and resisted Julius Caesar in 49 BCE. Inscriptions and monuments in its town square attest to the importance of Osimo during imperial times.

In the 6th century it was besieged twice in the course of the Gothic War (535–554) by Belisarius (see siege of Auximus) and Totila; the Byzantine historian Procopius said it was the leading town of Picenum.

Osimo was a free commune by 1100 A.D. It was later returned to the Pope by Cardinal Gil de Albornoz. In 1399–1430, it was a fief of the Malatesta family, who built a rocca, or "castle", which is no longer intact. Osimo was again made a part of the Papal States, and remained so until Italian unification in 1861.

== Main sights ==
Osimo retains a portion of its ancient town wall (2nd century BCE). Under the town is a large series of tunnels with esoteric bas-reliefs. The town hall contains a number of statues found on the site of the ancient forum. The new castle (1489), of which parts remain today, was built by Baccio Pontelli.

Among the churches in the town are the following:

- Osimo Cathedral: (8th–12th centuries) The restored Romanesque-Gothic church has a portal with sculptures of the 13th century, an old crypt, a fine bronze font of the 16th century and a series of portraits of all the bishops of the old diocese of Osimo. The baptistery is from the early 17th century and also has a notable baptismal font.
- Basilica of San Giuseppe da Copertino: was founded as a church dedicated to St Francis, but with the canonization in 1753 of Joseph of Cupertino, the church was rededicated and refurbished to house his relics.
- San Marco Evangelista: Erected in 14th century by Augustinian order; refurbished in later centuries, contains an altarpiece by Guercino.
- San Niccolò: 16th-century church
- Sanctuary of the Beata Vergine Addolorata: 20th century Neo-Romanesque church outside of the town center

== People ==
- Francesco Antonozzi (1685–1741), painter
- Andrea Cionna (born 1968), holder of the world record for the fastest marathon run by a blind man
- Bonfilius (1040–1115), monk, bishop and saint
- Luigi Fagioli (1898–1952), motor racing driver
- Bruno Giacconi (1889–1957), Olympian
- Sylvester Gozzolini, founder of the Sylvestrines and saint
- Clemente da Osimo (1235–1291), Italian Roman Catholic professed religious

== Twin towns ==
- Copertino, Italy
- Armstrong, Argentina

== See also ==
- Treaty of Osimo
- Roman Catholic Archdiocese of Ancona-Osimo

== Notes ==
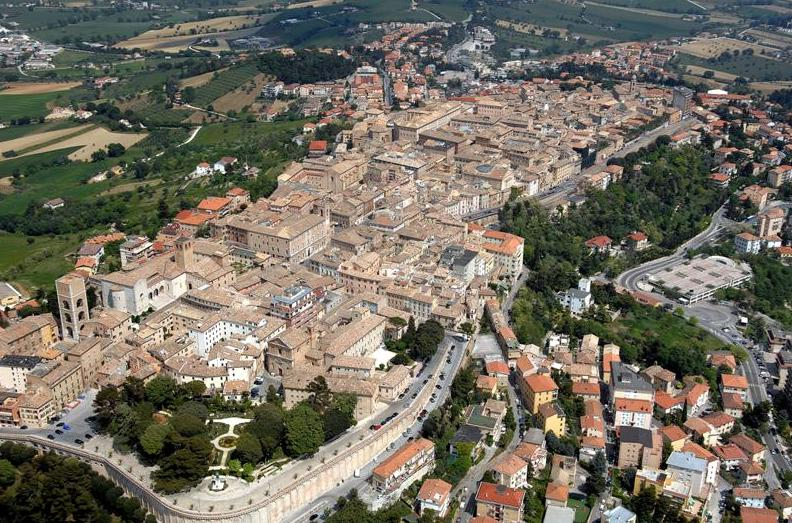
Osimo

== Bibliography ==
- Cesare Romiti; Biblioteca comunale e archivio storico (Osimo) (1968). Vicende di Osimo nel medio evo : celebrazione del III centenario della fondazione della Biblioteca 1668 -1968 (in Italian). Ancona: Tipografica Anconitana. p. 33. OCLC 843409959.
