= Orto Botanico dell'Università di Camerino =

Botanical garden in Italy

Coordinates: 43.13538°N 13.06934°E

The Orto Botanico dell'Università di Camerino, also known as the Orto Botanico di Camerino, is a nearly 1 hectare (2.5 acres) botanical garden operated by the University of Camerino, and located at Viale Oberdan 2, Camerino, Province of Macerata, Marche, Italy.

The garden was established in 1828 by Vincenzo Ottaviani, from 1826-1841 papal physician and professor of botany and chemistry. It is divided into two main parts: a flat area with shrubs and herbaceous species, and a slope with many trees and ferns.

== Exhibits ==
The garden contains two greenhouses with tropical and subtropical species, with many succulents and epiphytes including Begonia, Orchidaceae, and Tillandsia, as well as Cinnamomum camphora, Kalanchoe beharensis, Nepenthes mirabilis, Piper nigrum, Stanhopea tigrina, etc.

Its tree species include:

- Celtis australis
- Fagus sylvatica
- Ilex aquifolium
- Pinus nigra subsp. laricio
- Quercus cerris
- Quercus ilex
- Quercus petraea
- Staphylea pinnata
- Taxus baccata
- Ginkgo biloba
- Gleditschia triacanthos
- Liriodendron tulipifera
- Parrotia persica
- Sequoiadendron giganteum
- Asplenium onopteris
- Athyrium filix-femina
- Phyllitis scolopendrium
- Polypodium cambricum
- Polypodium vulgare
- Polystichum lonchitis
- Polystichum aculeatum
- Polystichum setiferum

Other specimens include:

- Aceras anthropophorum
- Achillea barrelieri
- Achillea oxyloba
- Aquilegia magellensis
- Arctostaphylos uva-ursi
- Aubrieta columnae
- Biarum tenuifolium
- Centaurea scannensis
- Centaurea tenoreana
- Cistus creticus
- Cistus monspeliensis
- Cistus salviifolius
- Cymbalaria pallida
- Drypis spinosa
- Edraianthus graminifolius
- Ferula glauca
- Festuca dimorpha
- Gagea granatelli
- Galium magellense
- Leontopodium alpinum
- Ophrys carbonifera
- Ophrys sphegodes
- Orchis morio
- Orchis pauciflora
- Ranunculus magellensis
- Romulea bulbocodium
- Romulea columnae
- Saponaria bellidifolia
- Saxifraga porophylla
- Sideritis italica
- Soldanella alpina
- Soldanella minima
- Viola eugeniae

== See also ==
- List of botanical gardens in Italy
