= Santa Chiara, Camerino =

Church in Camerino, Italy

Coordinates: 43.138541°N 13.070835°E

Santa Chiara is a Roman Catholic church and monastery in the town of Camerino, province of Macerata, region of the Marche, Italy. It is located just outside the old city walls, and is best known for housing for during the late 15th and early 16th centuries, the Clarissan nun, Saint Camilla Battista da Varano.

== History ==
The monastery was originally built by 1384, named Santa Maria Nova, and assigned to Olivetan monks, but in 1483, the Lord of Camerino, Giulio Cesare da Varano refurbished the monastery and assigned it to Clarissan nuns, which his illegitimate daughter, Camilla Battista, had joined. In 1484, along with eight other nuns from the Monastery of Urbino, Camilla Battista returned to Camerino, to occupy this monastery. She would serve as abbess for several years.

However, her father fell afoul of the papacy, and the army of Pope Alexander VI, captured the town and executed her father and three half-brothers. She fled first to Fermo, but then to Atri in the then Kingdom of Naples.

Here he learned the sad news of the massacre of his father and three brothers. It was able to return to Camerino only in 1503, after the death of Alexander VI, and the restoration of the properties confiscated from the Varano. Camilla Battista was to return briefly to Camerino, but in 1522 was sent to reorganize the Monastery of San Severino Marche.

The structures in Camerino were nearly razed by the earthquake of 1799, and the nuns were expelled in 1810 by the Napoleonic occupation. They were able to return a decade later. They were again dispossessed in 1866, until regaining ownership in 1896. During the First World War, the monastery was used as a military hospital and the nuns moved to the Monastery of San Salvatore.

Presently the a handful of nuns, derived from the Clarissan Monastery of San Severino Marche, are still associated with the monastery. The monastery suffered damage from the earthquake of 1977, and is still undergoing restorations. Camilla Battista was beatified in 1843, and canonized in 2010. The church sponsors a hostel for visitors.

The church has the following paintings:

- Santa Chiara, the Blessed Pietro da Mogliano, and Battista da Varano (18th century)
- Mary at the Temple by an unknown author.
- The crypt has the relics of Camilla Battista
- Fresco by Giovanni di Corraduccio in refectory
