= Jacopo da Camerino =

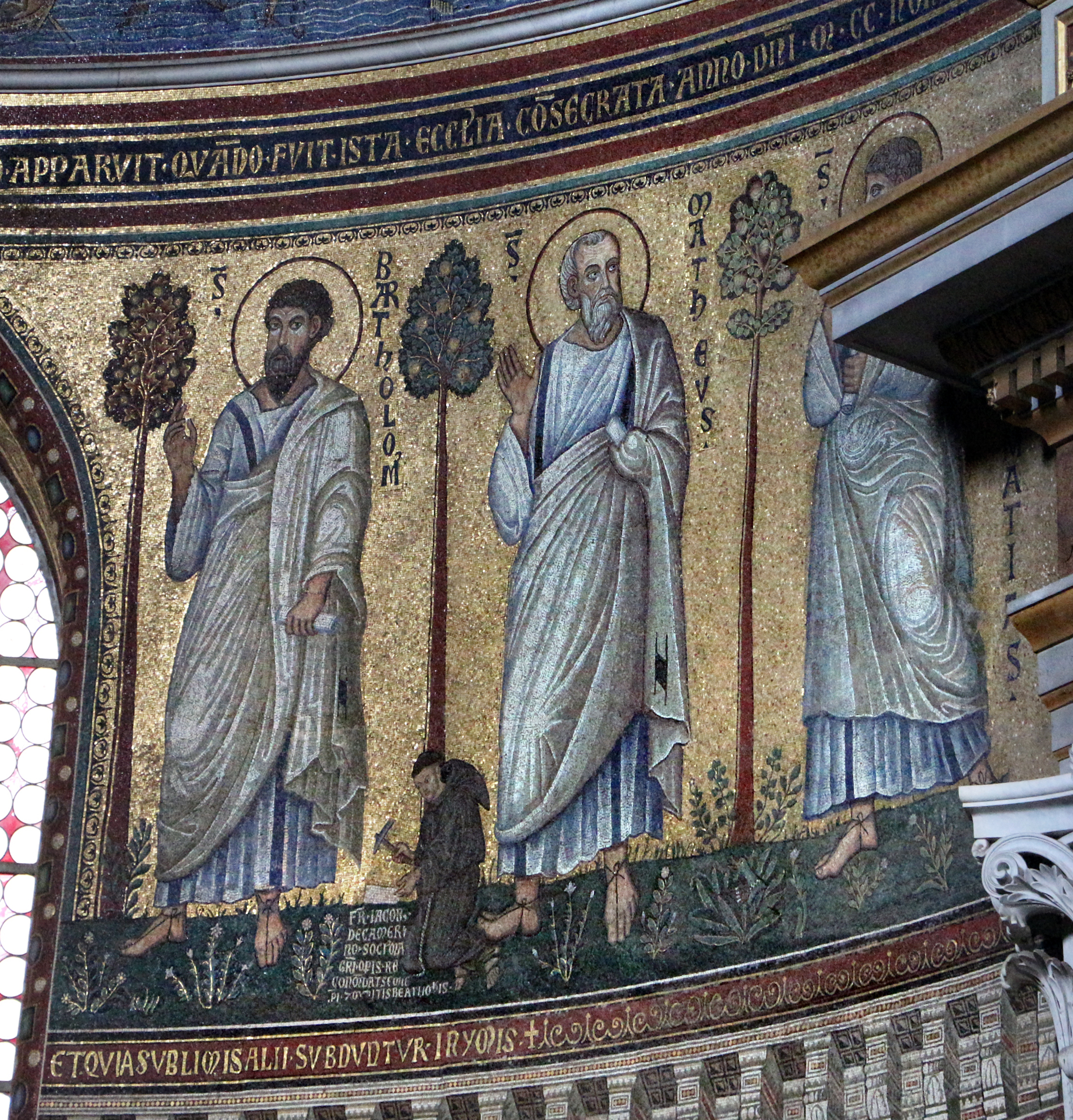
Self-portrait kneeling

Jacopo da Camerino was an Italian mosaicist and a Franciscan friar. He was born in Camerino in the Marca of Ancona, and is known to have worked in Rome and Orvieto from 1288 to 1321. He assisted Iacopo Torriti with the apse mosaics for the church of San Giovanni in Laterano, where he is also portrayed. His compositions are in a style similar to that of Cimabue.
