= Brugnaro =

Brugnaro is a surname. Notable people with the surname include:

- Francesco Giovanni Brugnaro (born 1943), Italian Catholic prelate
- Luigi Brugnaro (born 1961), Italian politician
