= Rocca di Borgia =

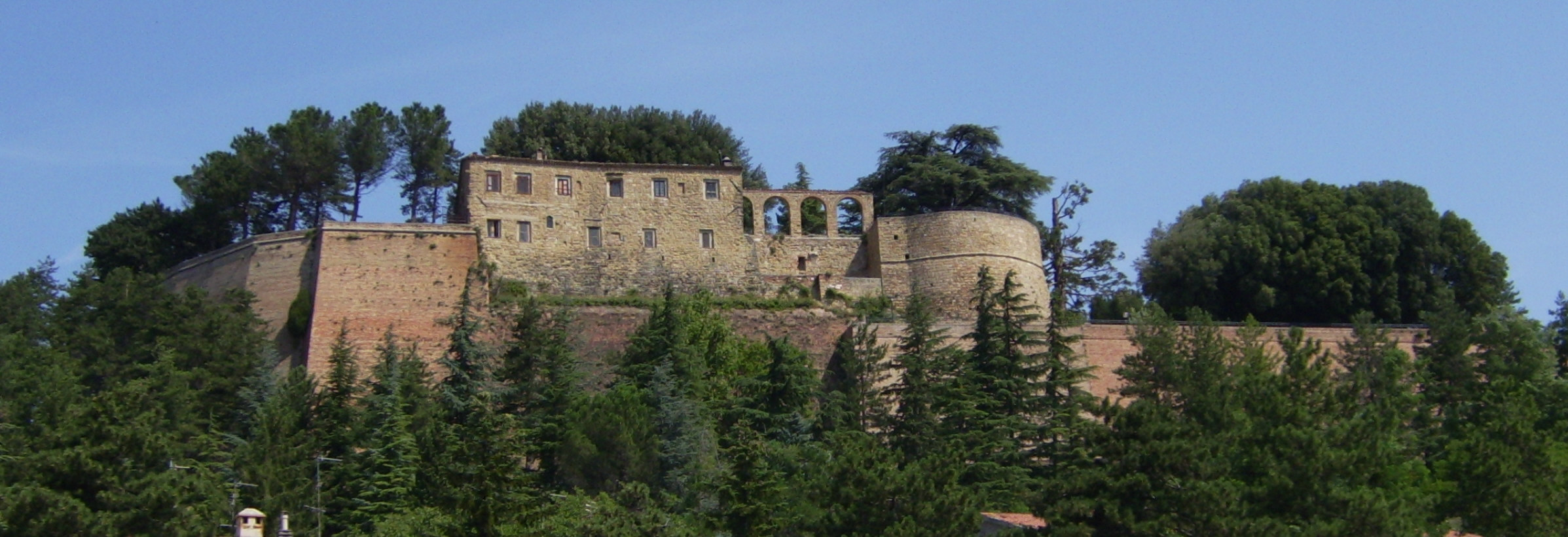
The Rocca dei Borgia.

The Rocca dei Borgia is a 16th-century castle in Camerino, in Marche, Italy originally built for Cesare Borgia.

The castle was designed by Ludovico Clodio for Cesare Borgia and was completed in 1503. It was originally built to enforce Borgia rule over Camerino and the surrounding area after Cesare's defeat of the Da Varano. It has cylindrical towers and a massive keep.

The castle was used as a command post by German occupation forces during World War II and fell into disrepair. That part of the castle which is still standing is now a restaurant.

== See also ==
- List of castles in Italy
