= Arboretum Apenninicum =

Botanical garden in Italy

Coordinates: 43°7′54.55″N 13°3′49.79″E

The Arboretum Apenninicum (9 hectares) is an arboretum operated by the University of Camerino, and located in Tuseggia, Camerino, Province of Macerata, Marche, Italy.

The arboretum was established in 1990 in an agricultural area, and is currently being developed with a primary emphasis on the woody plants of central Italy, though exotics are also being cultivated. Its collection includes Abies alba, Acer campestre, Ailanthus altissima, Carpinus betulus, Castanea sativa, Corylus avellana, Crataegus monogyna, Juglans regia, Populus tremula, Prunus spinosa, Quercus pubescens, Robinia pseudoacacia, and Spartium junceum.

== See also ==
- List of botanical gardens in Italy
