= Gerolamo Vitale de Buoi =

Most Reverend Gerolamo Vitale de Buoi
- Bishop of Camerino
- Church: Catholic Church
- Diocese: Diocese of Camerino
- In office: 1580–1596
- Predecessor: Alfonso Binarini
- Successor: Gentile Dolfino

Personal details
- Died: 26 January 1596 Camerino, Italy

Gerolamo Vitale de Buoi (died 1596) was a Roman Catholic prelate who served as Bishop of Camerino (1580–1596).

On 4 May 1580, Gerolamo Vitale de Buoi was appointed during the papacy of Pope Gregory XIII as Bishop of Camerino. He served as Bishop of Camerino until his death on 26 January 1596.

== External links and additional sources ==
- Cheney, David M. "Archdiocese of Camerino–San Severino Marche". Catholic-Hierarchy.org. (for Chronology of Bishops) ^{[self-published]}
- Chow, Gabriel. "Archdiocese of Camerino–San Severino Marche (Italy)". GCatholic.org. (for Chronology of Bishops) ^{[self-published]}

Catholic Church titles
Preceded by Alfonso Binarini	Bishop of Camerino; 1580–1596	Succeeded by Gentile Dolfino
