= Gentile Dolfino =

Bishop of Camerino from 1596 to 1601

Most Reverend Gentile Dolfin
- Bishop of Camerino
- Church: Catholic Church
- Diocese: Diocese of Camerino
- In office: 1596–1601
- Predecessor: Gerolamo Vitale de Buoi
- Successor: Innocenzo Del Bufalo-Cancellieri

Personal details
- Died: 4 March 1601 Camerino, Italy

Gentile Dolfin (died 1601) was a Roman Catholic prelate, member of the Delfin family, who served as Bishop of Camerino (1596–1601).

== Biography ==
On 18 December 1596, Gentile was appointed during the papacy of Pope Clement VIII as Bishop of Camerino. He served as Bishop of Camerino until his death on 4 March 1601.

== External links and additional sources ==
- Cheney, David M. "Archdiocese of Camerino–San Severino Marche". Catholic-Hierarchy.org. (for Chronology of Bishops) ^{[self-published]}
- Chow, Gabriel. "Archdiocese of Camerino–San Severino Marche (Italy)". GCatholic.org. (for Chronology of Bishops) ^{[self-published]}

Catholic Church titles
Preceded by Gerolamo Vitale de Buoi	Bishop of Camerino; 1596–1601	Succeeded by Innocenzo Del Bufalo-Cancellieri
