= Archdiocese of Camerino-San Severino Marche =

Roman Catholic archdiocese in Italy

Coordinates: 43.1359°N 13.0684°E

Archdiocese of Camerino-San Severino Marche Archidioecesis Camerinensis-Sancti Severini in Piceno

Catholic
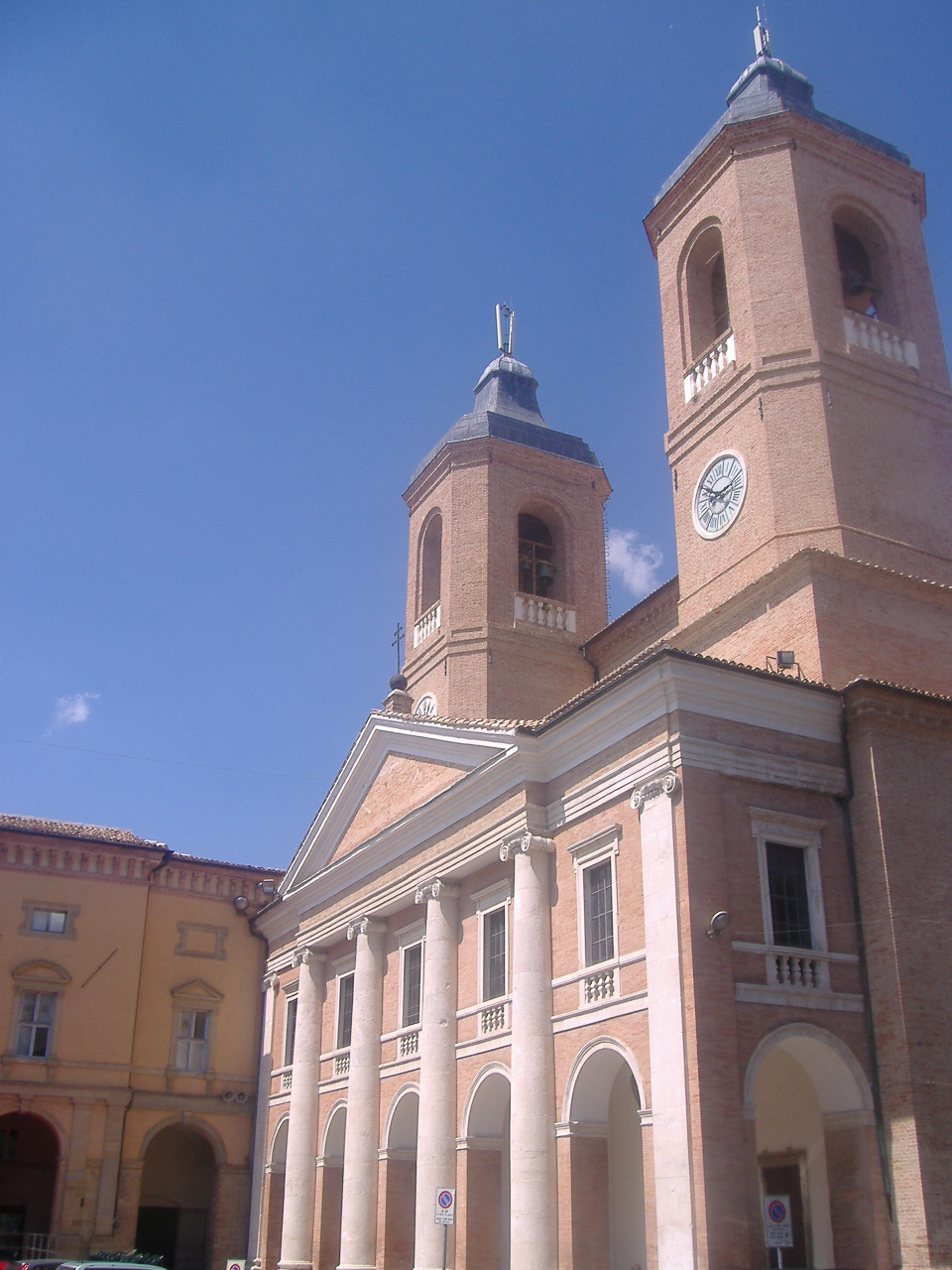
- Camerino Cathedral

Location
- Country: Italy
- Ecclesiastical province: Fermo

Statistics
- Area: 1,603 km^{2} (619 sq mi)
- Population: Total; Catholics: (as of 2006); 59,738; 57,250 (95.8%)
- Parishes: 95

Information
- Denomination: Catholic
- Sui iuris church: Latin Church
- Rite: Roman Rite
- Established: 3rd Century
- Cathedral: Camerino Cathedral (Cattedrale di SS. Annunziata)
- Co-cathedral: San Severino Cathedral (Concattedrale di S. Agostino)

Current leadership
- Pope: Leo XIV
- Archbishop: Francesco Massara
- Bishops emeritus: Francesco Giovanni Brugnaro

Map

Website
- arcidiocesicamerino.it

The Italian Archdiocese of Camerino-San Severino Marche (Latin: Archidioecesis Camerinensis-Sancti Severini in Piceno) is a Latin diocese of the Catholic Church based in Camerino, a city in the Province of Macerata, in the central Italian Marche region of the Apennines. It is a suffragan of the Archdiocese of Fermo.

In 1986, the historic archdiocese of Camerino — an archdiocese since 1787 — was united with the diocese of San Severino.

== History ==
During the persecution under Decius in 249, the priest Porphyrius, master of the youthful martyr Venantius, and the Bishop Leontius suffered martyrdom at Camerino. Gerontius appears at the Council of Rome in 464/465.

== Bishops ==
=== Diocese of Camerino ===
Latin Name: Camerinensis
Erected: 3rd Century

- Victorinus of Camerino (6th century)
- Ansovinus (816);

. . .

- Marco Ardinghelli, OP (31 Jan 1360 – 1373 Died)

. . .

- Alberto Alberti (4 Mar 1437 – 3 Aug 1445 Died)

. . .

- Alessandro Oliva, OESA (16 Nov 1461 – 20 Aug 1463 Died) (Administrator)
- Agapito Rufo (1465), of whom Pope Pius II said "that it was doubtful if there ever was a more joyous poet or a more illustrious orator";
- Andrea Veroli (8 Oct 1464 – 1478 Died)

. . .

- Fabrizio Varano (13 Jun 1482 – 7 Mar 1508 Died)
- Sisto Gara della Rovere (Franciotti) (1508 – 11 Jun 1509 Appointed, Bishop of Padua)
- Francesco della Rovere (archbishop) (23 Feb 1508 – Jul 1509 Appointed, Bishop of Vicenza)
- Anton Giacomo Bongiovanni (27 Jun 1509 – 1535 Resigned)
- Giovanni Domenico de Cupis (5 Jul 1535 – 5 Mar 1537 Resigned)
- Berardo Bongiovanni (5 Mar 1537 – 12 Sep 1574 Died)
- Alfonso Binarini (30 Aug 1574 – 26 Apr 1580 Died)
- Gerolamo Vitale de Buoi (4 May 1580 – 26 Jan 1596 Died)
- Gentile Dolfino (18 Dec 1596 – 4 Mar 1601 Died)
- Innocenzo Del Bufalo-Cancellieri (14 May 1601 – 20 Feb 1606 Resigned)
- Giovanni Severini (archbishop) (20 Feb 1606 – 14 Mar 1622 Appointed, Archbishop of Manfredonia)
- Cesare Gherardi (2 May 1622 – 30 Sep 1623 Died)
- Giovanni Battista Altieri (seniore) (26 Feb 1624 – 27 Nov 1627 Resigned)
- Emilio Bonaventura Altieri (29 Nov 1627 – 7 Jun 1666 Resigned)
- Giacomo Franzoni (7 Jun 1666 – 23 Nov 1693 Resigned)
- Francesco Juste Giusti (23 Nov 1693 – 6 Apr 1702 Died)
- Bernardino Belluzzi (25 Sep 1702 – 15 Feb 1719 Died)
- Cosimo Torelli (15 May 1719 – 27 Aug 1736 Died)
- Ippolito de Rossi (26 Sep 1736 – 17 Jan 1746 Appointed, Bishop of Senigallia)
- Francesco Vivani (18 Apr 1746 – 30 Dec 1767 Died)
- Luigi Amici (20 Jun 1768 – 5 Jul 1795 Died)

=== Archdiocese of Camerino ===
Latin Name: Camerinensis
Elevated: 17 December 1787
Immediately Subject to the Holy See

- Angelicus Benincasa, OFMCap (27 Jun 1796 – 17 May 1815 Died)
- Nicola Mattei Baldini (14 Apr 1817 – 27 Jan 1842 Appointed, Archbishop (Personal Title) of Corneto (Tarquinia) e Montefiascone)
- Gaetano Baluffi (27 Jan 1842 – 21 Apr 1845 Appointed, Titular Archbishop of Perge)
- Stanislao Vincenzo Tomba, B (21 Apr 1845 – 5 Feb 1847 Died)
- Felicissimo Salvini (12 Apr 1847 – 23 Jan 1893 Died)
- Celestino del Frate (21 May 1894 – 26 Apr 1908 Died)
- Pietro Paolo Camillo Moreschini, CP (29 Apr 1909 – 24 Oct 1918 Died)
- Ettore Fronzi (14 Dec 1918 – 1 Oct 1938 Resigned)
- Umberto Malchiodi (14 Nov 1938 – 18 Feb 1946 Appointed, Coadjutor Archbishop of Piacenza)
- Giuseppe D'Avack (18 Feb 1946 – 13 Feb 1964 Resigned)
- Bruno Frattegiani (14 Feb 1964 – 20 Apr 1989 Retired)

=== Archdiocese of Camerino-San Severino Marche ===
Latin Name: Camerinensis-Sancti Severini in Piceno
United: 30 September 1986 with Diocese of San Severino

- Francesco Gioia, OFMCap (2 Feb 1990 – 9 Jan 1993 Resigned)
- Piergiorgio Silvano Nesti, CP (23 Jul 1993 – 27 Nov 1996 Appointed, Secretary of the Congregation for Institutes of Consecrated Life and Societies of Apostolic Life)
- Angelo Fagiani (14 Apr 1997 – 3 Sep 2007 Resigned)
- Francesco Giovanni Brugnaro (3 Sep 2007 – 27 Jul 2018 Resigned)
- Francesco Massara (27 Jul 2018 – )

== Sources ==
- Benigni, Umberto. "Diocese of Camerino." The Catholic Encyclopedia. Vol. 3. New York: Robert Appleton Company, 1908. Retrieved 2016-10-10.
