= Pietro Corradini =

Italian Roman Catholic priest

Blessed Pietro Corradini O.F.M.
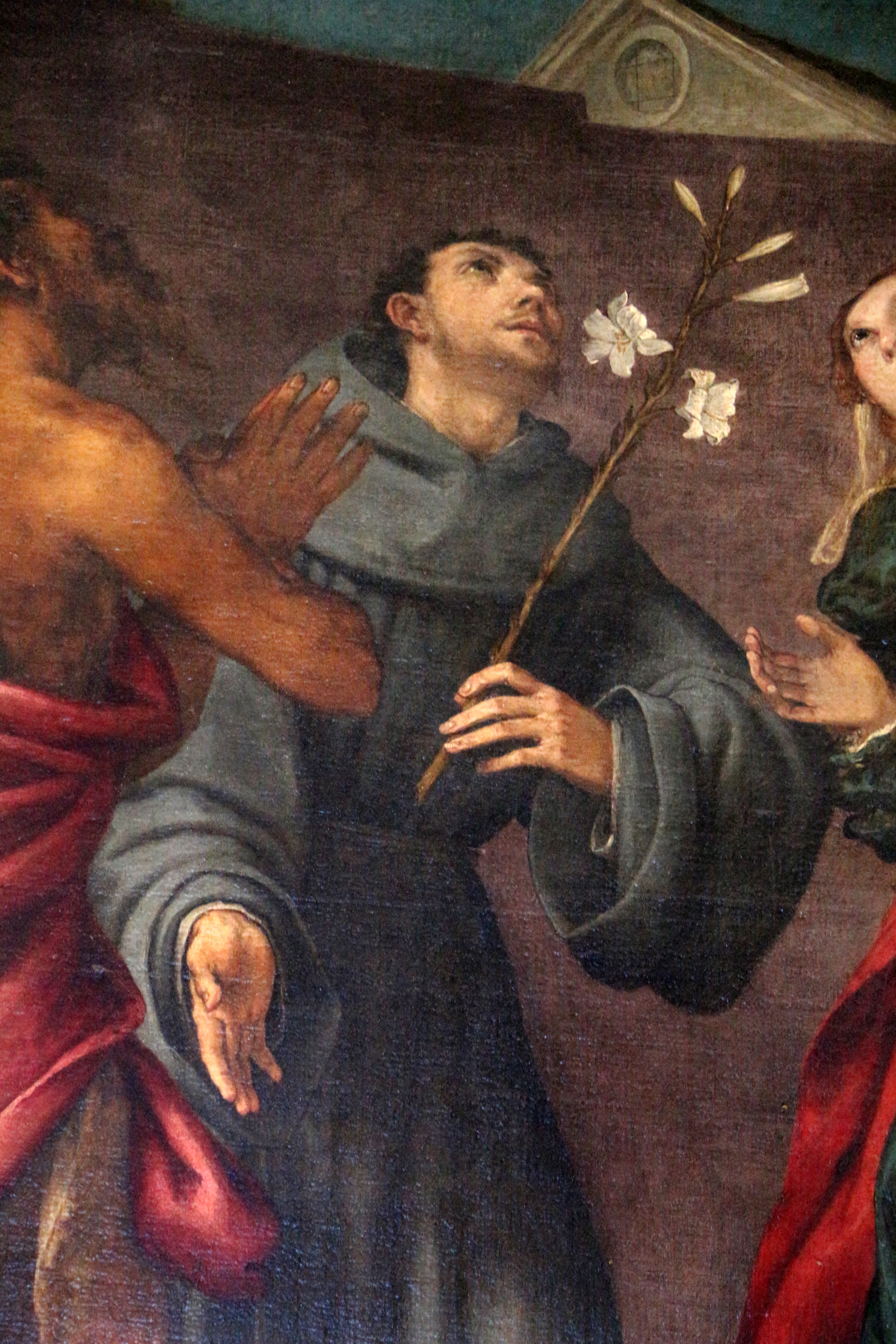

Priest
- Born: 1435; Mogliano, Macerata, Papal States
- Died: 25 July 1490 (aged 55); Fermo, Papal States
- Venerated in: Roman Catholic Church
- Beatified: 10 August 1760, Saint Peter's Basilica, Papal States by Pope Clement XIII
- Feast: 25 July
- Attributes: Franciscan habit

Pietro Corradini (1435 – 25 July 1490) was an Italian Roman Catholic priest and a professed member of the Order of Friars Minor. Corradini served in several leadership positions within his order which bought him into contact with the likes of James of the Marches and Camilla Battista da Varano - he was her confessor and spiritual director - while in turn being a well-known figure due to his mild mannered nature and for his preaching abilities.

His beatification received the approval of Pope Clement XIII on 10 August 1760.

== Life ==
Pietro Corradini was born in 1435 in Macerata into a prominent household.

He had a vision in 1448 in which he witnessed the world in ruins though were rescued due to a single monk. He studied law in Perugia where he received a doctorate in legal studies in 1464. His path seemed destined towards the legal profession though in 1467 he attended a sermon that a popular monk presided over and then went up to him and asked to be admitted as a Franciscan. Corradini joined the Order of Friars Minor in 1467 and was later ordained to the priesthood. He became somewhat of a travelling preacher in the region of Marche and was later sent to Crete where he served as a commissioner for the order in 1472 while serving as an advisor and collaborator of James of the Marches who selected Corradini to be his protégé after seeing the virtues of the priest.

Corradini also was a friend as well as both the confessor and the spiritual director of Camilla Battista da Varano and also was a spiritual guide to her father. Corradini also preached at one stage a crusade against the Ottoman Empire and served on three occasions as the Franciscan provincial for the Marche region; his first was in 1477 followed with appointments in 1483 and 1489. He even served as a Franciscan representative to Rome in 1474.

He died after a brief illness coupled with a violent fever during just after midnight on 25 July 1490. He had felt ill in Camerino so rushed to get the Viaticum before he died. The bells for the Te Deum during the midnight office rung when he died. Da Varano spoke at his funeral.

== Beatification ==
The beatification process commenced not too long after the priest's death and culminated on 10 August 1760 after Pope Clement XIII issued a formal decree that approved Corradini's local 'cultus' - or popular veneration - thus approving the beatification itself.
