= Camilla Battista da Varano =

Christian saint

Saint Camilla Battista da Varano OSCl
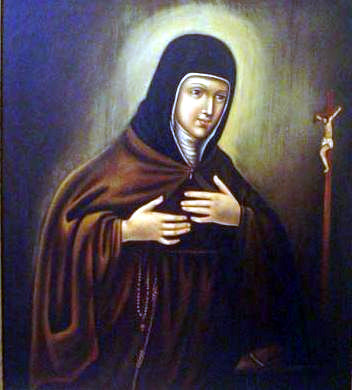

Princess and abbess
- Born: 9 April 1458; Camerino, Macerata, Italy
- Died: 31 May 1524 (aged 66); Camerino, Macerata, Italy
- Venerated in: Roman Catholic Church; Franciscan Order
- Beatified: 7 April 1843 by Pope Gregory XVI
- Canonized: 17 October 2010, Vatican City by Pope Benedict XVI
- Major shrine: Monastery of Saint Clare; Camerino, Macerata, Italy
- Feast: 31 May

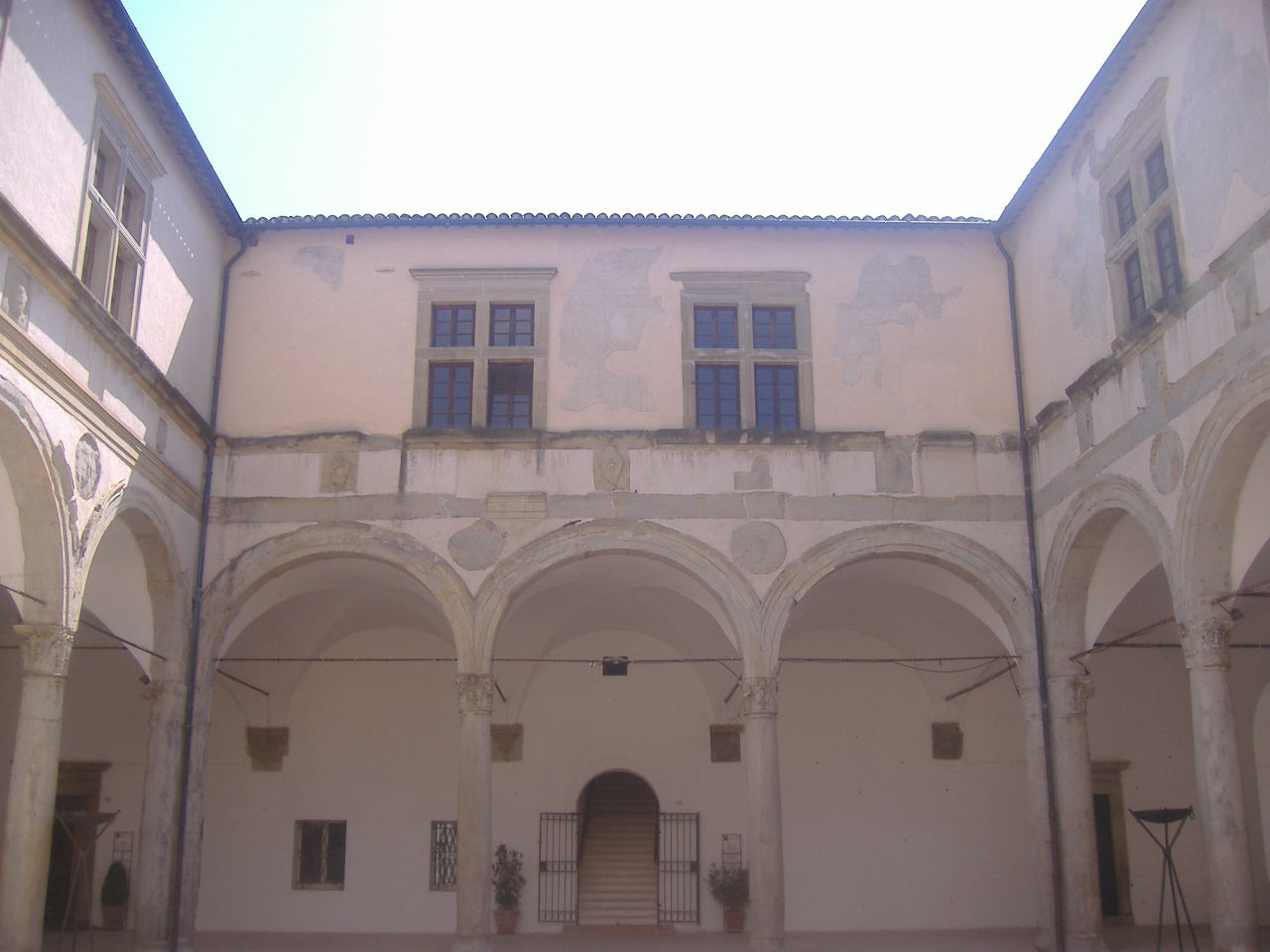
Palace of Blessed Camilla's father, the Duke of Camerino

Camilla Battista da Varano OSCl, (9 April 1458 – 31 May 1524), from Camerino, Italy, was an Italian princess and a Poor Clare nun and abbess. She is venerated as a saint in the Catholic Church.

== Early life ==
Varano was born out of wedlock in Camerino, Macerata, in the Marche region of Italy, the daughter of noblewoman Cecchina di Maestro Giacomo and Giulio Cesare da Varano, the Duke of Camerino. She was raised by Giulio Cesare's wife, Giovanna Malatesta. Both her father and stepmother were very fond of her, and she grew up in the splendour of the court, receiving an education which included grammar and rhetoric.

When she was 10 years old Varano was so impressed with the preaching of Friars Domenico of Leonessa and Peter of Mogliano that every Friday she would meditate on the passion of Christ. One day Verano came across a booklet that contained a meditation on the Passion of Christ divided into fifteen parts (to be recited like a Rosary) and she began to read it every Friday, while on her knees before a crucifix. She also then began other practices such as fasting on bread and water, keeping night vigils. At this time she continued to spend time playing music, singing, dancing, promenading, and other youthful pursuits abundant in court life.

From the ages of 18–21, she went through three years of deep spiritual struggles against the allurements of the world. Her father did all in his power to force his daughter into marriage, even to the extent of imprisoning her. During these two and half years, she reported having very deep conversions with Christ, and she received many divine visitations. She claimed that Jesus had given her 'three fragrant spring lilies': an intense hatred of the world, a heart-felt humility and a burning desire to endure evil. She composed her first written work in this time, a Lauda ("Praise"), which was about the joy she felt in knowing that Christ loved her. She claimed that she once saw Christ (in answer to her desire to see Him), but she saw only His back as He was walking away. She also experienced seven months of severe physical illness and depression.

Camilla resisted her father's plans so firmly that after two and a half years he restored her to liberty, for fear, as he said, of drawing upon himself divine vengeance, and gave his consent to her becoming a nun. During the Lent of 1479 Varano listened to a sermon of Observant Franciscan friar Francesco of Urbino, whom she described as "the trumpet of the Holy Spirit". This sermon struck her deeply. After another sermon by the same friar (with whom she secretly corresponded) on the feast of the Annunciation, 24 March 1479, she then took a vow of chastity; she was 21 at the time. At this same time, she also began to increasingly hear voices inside her telling her that her only hope of salvation was to become a nun.

Varano then had a bitter internal struggle, while dealing with sneers and gossip behind her back by members of the court, and her father initially opposed her wish to enter into consecrated life, wishing her to marry. After a confession of her sins to a certain Friar Oliviero on Saturday within the Octave of Easter, 17 April 1479, she decided that she would enter the Poor Clare monastery at Urbino, which was under the reform of the Strict Observance of the Order.

== Monastic life ==
On 14 November 1481, Camilla entered the monastery of the Poor Clares at Urbino and took the name Baptista. She described the step in Biblical terms, as having been freed from the 'slavery of Egypt' (referring to the world), and from 'the hands of powerful Pharaoh' (referring to her father), that she had 'crossed the Red Sea' (left the court life), and was 'placed in the desert of holy religion' (entered a monastery).

Varano made her profession in 1483 and claimed it was a bittersweet moment for her, as there was much political and religious controversy about her decision to become a nun. It was during her stay at Urbino that she wrote Ricordi di Gesu, a meditation in the form of a letter from Jesus to her. She intensified her meditations on the Passion and claimed to enter more deeply into the mental pains of the heart of Jesus.

On 4 January 1484 Varano and eight other of her companions transferred to the new Monastery of Santa Maria Nuova at Camerino (located near her father's castle), in a monastery which her father had purchased from the Olivetan monks and restored in order to have his daughter closer to him. Her father had made arrangements with the Vicar General of the Observant Franciscans, under whose authority the Poor Clares operated, and the pope, in order to have her re-located there. Battista, however, was reluctant to do so and moved only under obedience.

One of the most significant points in Varano's spiritual life occurred then, when she had a vision lasting fifteen days of St. Clare of Assisi. She wrote that she did not recognize the nun at first, but afterwards she knew that it was Clare, the foundress of her Order, and the experience caused her love and devotion to St. Clare to intensify. It was a few days after this that she had a vision of two cherubim holding her at the bleeding feet of Christ (described below), which lasted two months. She had another vision following this of God's love, which afterwards convinced her of her unworthiness, and she asked God to always remain prostrate at Christ's feet. The next five years she recorded as being filled with inner suffering that gave her a desire to leave the body and be with Christ.

In 1488, Camilla wrote I dolori mentali di Gesu nella sua Passione (The mental sorrows of Christ during his Passion), which followed from her long meditations on this topic. It was written as a meditation by an anonymous nun to her abbess, and it consists in Christ's presenting eight of His sorrows: the damned, the elect, his mother, Mary Magdalen, the apostles, Judas, the Jewish people, and the ingratitude of all creation.

The following five years were ones wherein she experienced a spiritual crisis. She wrote that she was battling with the devil, as she felt abandonment and desolation while being haunted with temptations to rebel against God and to disbelieve the scriptures. During this period, between 27 February and 13 March 1491 she composed 'Vita Spirituale', (Spiritual Life, or her Autobiography) which was a long letter to Domenico of Leonessa (the preacher who had inspired her tears as a child). In the letter she told him how he had inspired her spiritual life and expressed his gratitude to him. She thought that this would be her last testament before dying, but she was to live on for another 30 years.

In 1492 she met Don Antonio, a Spanish Olivetan monk, who became her spiritual director for four years.

Her father founded a new monastery of that Order at Camerino, and presented it to his daughter. By the time she turned 35 years of age, she was elected Abbess for the first time, a position she continued to hold for several terms. She was elected abbess of her monastery in 1500 and she was re-elected in 1507, 1513 and 1515.

== Flight from Camerino ==
In 1501 Duke Giulio Cesare was excommunicated by Pope Alexander VI for hosting enemies of the pope and for allegedly assassinating a cousin of the pope. The papal forces, led by Cesare Borgia, captured Camerino in 1502 and the Duke and three of his sons were imprisoned and then strangled, though her mother and youngest brother escaped. Mother Battista fled the city and sought refuge in Fermo, but the local population, terrified of facing the wrath of Cesare Borgia, rejected her. She found refuge in the village of Atri, in the Abruzzo region of the Kingdom of Naples, with the Duchess of Amalfi, Isabella Piccolomini Todeschini, staying there until 1503 when with Julius II the new pope she felt safe to return to Camerino.

== Later life ==
In 1505, Pope Julius II sent Varano to found a monastery in Fermo. She went and stayed for two years.

In 1512 through her intervention in San Severino Marche (also in the Italian Marches) she successfully stopped the execution of Napoleone of Camerino for murder. Varano wrote to her brother-in-law, Muzio Colonna, to ask that he spare the inhabitants of Montecchio during his military expedition against Fermo in 1515.

In 1521 Varano herself traveled to San Severino Marche to train a monastery of nuns who had just adopted the Rule of St. Clare. She wrote a letter to the Vicar General of the Observant Franciscans, Giovanni of Fano, to whom her last written work 'Trattato della Purita di cuore' was dedicated in the same year. She died in her monastery in Camerino during a plague on 31 March 1524, on the feast of Corpus Christi, at the age of 66.

Varano's remains were placed to rest in the crypt of the Monastery of the Poor Clares of Camerino.

== Visions ==
She is said to have experienced visions. According to St. Alphonsus Liguori, in his "Discourse IX of the Dolors of Mary", Passino writes that Jesus Christ Himself one day, speaking to blessed Baptista Varani of Camerino, assured her that when on the cross, so great was His affliction at seeing His Mother at His feet in such bitter anguish, that compassion for her caused Him to die without consolation; so much so, that the blessed Baptista, being supernaturally enlightened as to the greatness of this suffering of Jesus, exclaimed, "O Lord, tell me no more of this Thy sorrow, for I can no longer bear it."

== Writings ==
She wrote with equal facility in Latin and Italian, and who was accounted one of the most accomplished scholars of her day. Camilla wrote extensively. Her work includes Pregheria a Dio (1488–1490), Remembrances of Jesus (Ricordi di Gesu) (1483–1491), Praise of the Vision of Christ (1479–1481), and The Spiritual Life (Vita Spirituale) (1491), an autobiography from 1466 to 1491 which is considered a "jewel of art" and of the spiritual life. In this work, she describes how two seraphim with wings of gold, appeared to her because they were assigned to help her understand the mysterious working of unitive love.

Two angels came to me, dressed in resplendent white garments which I have seen only worn by Jesus. They had wings of gold. One of them took my soul from the right side, the other from the left side, and they elevated it in the air, laying it down near the crucified feet of the Son of God made Man. This state lasted about two months almost continually; I seem to walk, to speak, and do what I wished, deprived however of my soul. It remained there where the two Angels had placed it but they never abandoned it.

...They (the celestial spirits) declare to me that they were so intimate with God that God is not ever separated from them. They also explained to me that the seraphim were likewise united to the cherubim in that none of them could ever go without the other to a soul.

— Camilla Varano, The Spiritual Life

Completed in 1488, Treatise on the Mental Sufferings of Jesus Christ our Lord (I dolori mentale di Gesu nella sua passione), is considered a masterpiece and is her best-known work. It is largely a series of translations of revelations which she received.

Also attributed to Varano are three brief hand-written compositions, a short letter to her brother-in-law Muzio Colonna (1515), a Memoria recording her first encounter with the Benedictine-Olivetan monk Antonio di Segovia (1492), a eulogy in honour of the death of the Observant Franciscan Pietro da Mogliano (1491), as well brief prayers, letters, poems, tracts and revelations.

Her works also include the: "Recordationes et instructiones spirituales novem", which she wrote about 1491; "Opus de doloribus mentalibus D.N.J.C.", written during 1488-91 and first published at Camerino in 1630; "Liber suae conversionis", a story of her life, written in 1491, and first published at Macerata in 1624. These works have been edited by the Bollandists in connection with some of Baptista's letters. But most of her "Epistolae spirituales ad devotas personas" as well as her "Carmina pleraque latina et vulgaria" are still unpublished.

Varano wrote in the dialect of the Marches region, while quoting scripture in Latin, which preserved the usage of the language at that period.

Her writings represented a high point in the Poor Clare tradition through its emphasis on the following of the "poor and crucified Christ", articulated by St. Bonaventure as a mark of Franciscan life, as well as mystical espousal with Christ. An element of her writing not found in St Clare's was her stress on Christ's inner sufferings and the need to suffer the evil that had befallen Him.

As a whole the writings of Baptista are remarkable for originality of thought, spirituality, and vivid language. Br. José Rodríguez Carballo, ofm, Minister General of the Friars Minor quotes Camilla Baptista:

O Most Clement God, if you were to reveal to me all the secrets of your Sacred Heart and everyday were to show me the Angelic Hierarchies; if everyday I could raise the dead, it would not be because of these things that you love me with an infinite love. Rather, it would be because I have done good to the one who has wronged me, said good things of and praise the one who has spoken ill of me and wronged me unjustly.

== Veneration ==
Both Philip Neri and Alphonsus Liguori recorded their admiration for her.

On 8 April 1821 Pope Leo XII approved the acts of the process for her canonization. Varano was beatified by Pope Gregory XVI on 7 April 1843, following recognition of her long-standing public cult. On 4 February 1893 her writings were also approved. On 17 October 2010 Pope Benedict XVI canonized her, along with five others.

Her feast was originally kept in the Franciscan Order on 2 June but is more recently commemorated on 30 May.

== Depictions ==
Saint Baptista Varani is depicted in a stained glass window in the church of St. Thomas of Canterbury, Woodford Green, Essex.

== Bibliography ==
- Acta Sanctorum, May, VII (Antwerp, 1688), 476–514;
- Luke Wadding, Annales Minorum ad annum 1509, n. 25;
- ____, Scriptores ord. Min. (3rd ed., 1906), 36;
- Sbaralea, Supplementum, pt. I (1908), 113–114;
- Leon de Clary, Lives of the Saints and Blessed of the Three Orders of St. Francis, II (Taunton, 1886), 315–48;
- De Rambuteau, La Bienheureuse Varani, Princesse de Camerino et religieuse franciscaine (Paris, 1906);
- Jorgenson, I det Hoje (Copenhagen, 1908), German tr. in Excelsis (Kempten and Munich, 1911),
- For an appreciation of her poetry see Crescimbene, Storia della volgare poesia, I, lib. 2, cap. xiii.
