= Camerino Cathedral =

Roman Catholic cathedral in Marche, Italy

Coordinates: 43.1359°N 13.0684°E

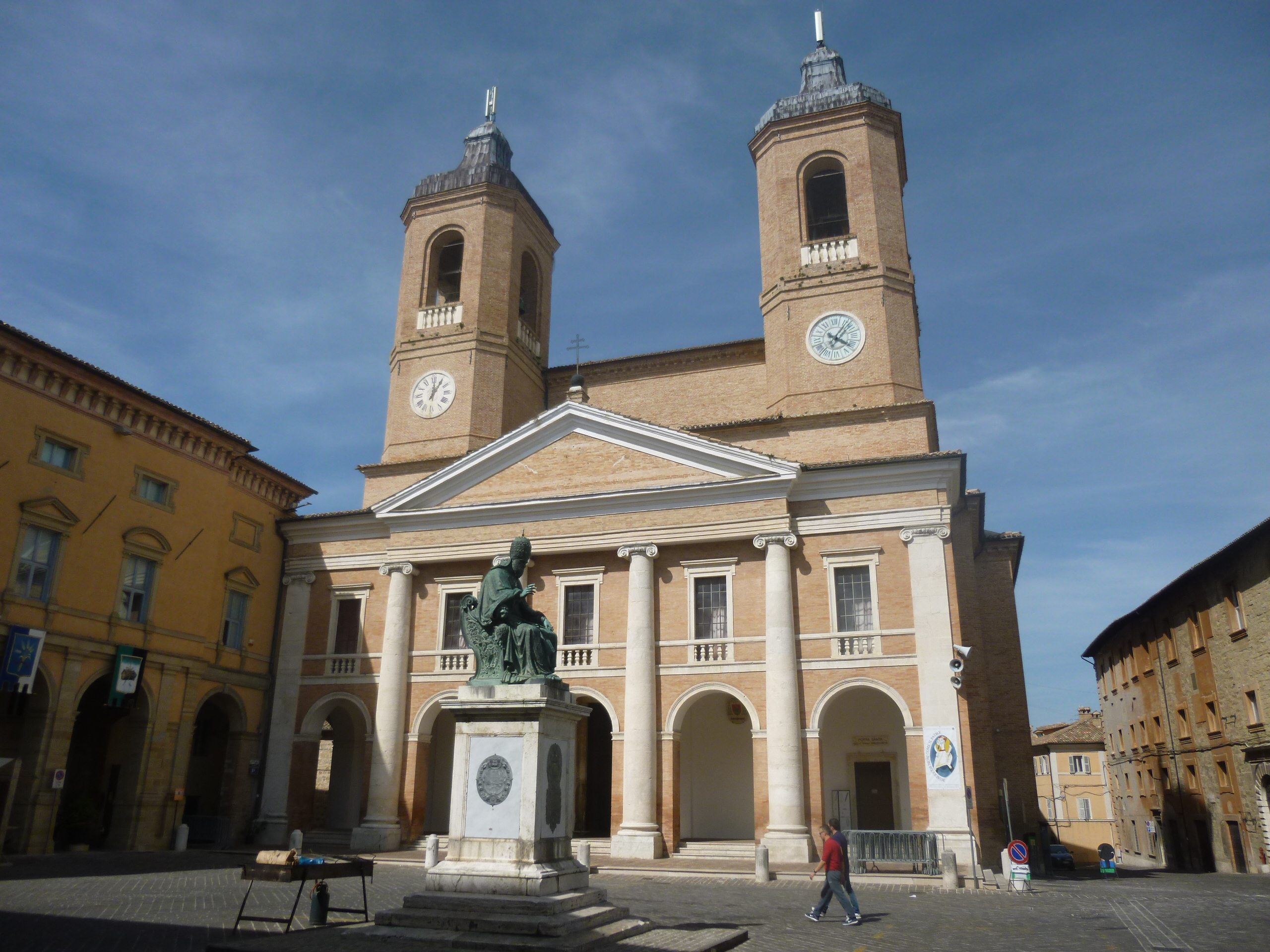
West front of the cathedral

Camerino Cathedral (Italian: Duomo di Camerino, Cattedrale di Santa Maria Annunziata) is a Neoclassical Roman Catholic cathedral and minor basilica, dedicated to the Annunciation, in Camerino, Region of Marche, Italy. Since 1987 it has been the seat of the Archbishop of Camerino-San Severino Marche, having been the seat of the Archbishops of Camerino from 1787 and previously that of the Bishops of Camerino.

== History ==
The present church was built in 1802–1832 based on designs by Andrea Vici and Clemente Folchi. It was erected on the site of the previous medieval Romanesque-Gothic cathedral, destroyed in the 1799 earthquake.

The sacristy still houses works such as a 13th-century painted crucifix, a 15th-century icon of the Madonna della Misericordia, and other paintings. The church once housed a large polyptych by Carlo Crivelli, which was disassembled and sold: the central panel is now in the Pinacoteca di Brera in Milan. One of the chapels once contained frescoes, now lost, by Andrea Sacchi.

The crypt has two 14th-century lions sculpted by Armanno da Pioraco, a bust of Cardinal Angelo Giori and his brother Prospero by followers of Bernini, and a marble 14th- or 15th-century coffin holding the relics of Saint Ansovinus (a 9th-century bishop of Camerino).

The cathedral was declared a minor basilica in 1970.
