= Angelo Fagiani =

Italian priest (1943–2020)

- Archbishop of Camerino-San Severino Marche
- Church: Catholic Church
- Archdiocese: Archdiocese of Camerino-San Severino Marche
- In office: 14 April 1997 – 3 September 2007
- Predecessor: Piergiorgio Nesti
- Successor: Francesco Giovanni Brugnaro

Orders
- Ordination: 13 March 1967
- Consecration: 31 May 1997 by Cleto Bellucci

Personal details
- Born: 18 April 1943 Monterubbiano, Province of Ascoli Piceno, Kingdom of Italy
- Died: 4 July 2020 (aged 77) Fermo, Marche, Italy

Angelo Fagiani (18 April 1943 – 4 July 2020) was an Italian Roman Catholic archbishop.

Fagiani was born in Italy and was ordained to the priesthood in 1967. He served as archbishop of the Roman Catholic Archdiocese of Camerino-San Severino Marche, Italy, from 1999 until 2007.
