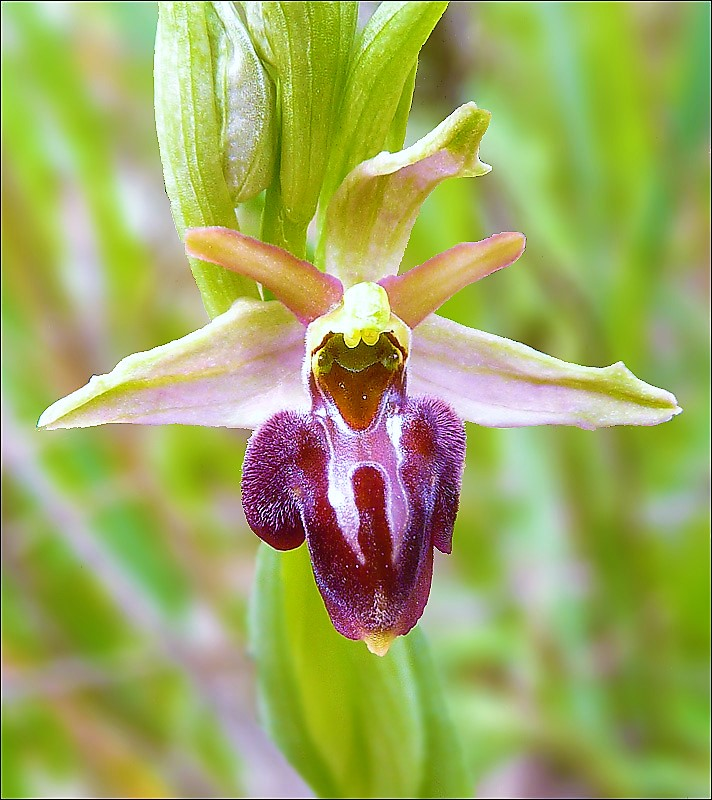

Scientific classification
- Kingdom: Plantae
- Clade: Tracheophytes
- Clade: Angiosperms
- Clade: Monocots
- Order: Asparagales
- Family: Orchidaceae
- Subfamily: Orchidoideae
- Genus: Ophrys
- Species: O. sphegodes
- Subspecies: O. s. subsp. taurica

Trinomial name
- Ophrys sphegodes subsp. taurica (Aggeenko) Soó ex Niketic & Djordjevic

Synonyms
- List: Ophrys adonidis A.Camus & Gomb.; Ophrys aegilica Engelen; Ophrys aesculapii subsp. pseudoaraneifera Renz; Ophrys alasiatica Kreutz, Segers & H.Walraven; Ophrys amanensis subsp. antalyensis (Kreutz & Seckel) Kreutz; Ophrys amanensis subsp. iceliensis (Kreutz) Kreutz; Ophrys antalyensis Kreutz & Seckel; Ophrys aranifera subsp. boissieri (Soó) Soó; Ophrys aranifera subsp. macedonica H.Fleischm. ex Soó; Ophrys aranifera subsp. mammosa (Desf.) Soó; Ophrys aranifera subsp. taurica (Aggeenko) K.Richt.; Ophrys aranifera subsp. vierhapperi (Soó) Soó; Ophrys caucasica Woronow ex Grossh.; Ophrys caucasica subsp. cyclocheila Aver.; Ophrys chaonica P.Delforge; Ophrys ciliciana (Kreutz) P.Delforge; Ophrys cretensis subsp. samica A.Alibertis; Ophrys cyclocheila (Aver.) P.Delforge; Ophrys doerfleri subsp. mouterdeana (B.Baumann & H.Baumann) Paulus & M.Hirth; Ophrys eretriae M.Hirth & Paulus; Ophrys grammica (B.Willing & E.Willing) Devillers-Tersch. & Devillers; Ophrys grammica subsp. knossia A.Alibertis; Ophrys hansreinhardii M.Hirth; Ophrys herae M.Hirth & H.Spaeth; Ophrys herae subsp. janrenzii (M.Hirth) M.Hirth; Ophrys herae subsp. osmaniaca Kreutz; Ophrys hittitica Kreutz & Ruedi Peter; Ophrys hystera Kreutz & Ruedi Peter; Ophrys iceliensis Kreutz; Ophrys janrenzii M.Hirth; Ophrys knossia (A.Alibertis) P.Delforge; Ophrys leucophthalma Devillers-Tersch. & Devillers; Ophrys macedonica (H.Fleischm. ex Soó) Devillers-Tersch. & Devillers; Ophrys mammosa Desf.; Ophrys mammosa subsp. caucasica (Woronow ex Grossh.) Soó; Ophrys mammosa subsp. ciliciana Kreutz; Ophrys mammosa subsp. cyclocheila (Aver.) B.Baumann, H.Baumann, R.Lorenz & Ruedi Peter; Ophrys mammosa subsp. falsomammosa B.Baumann & H.Baumann; Ophrys mammosa subsp. grammica B.Willing & E.Willing; Ophrys mammosa subsp. janrenzii (M.Hirth) Kreutz; Ophrys mammosa subsp. leucophthalma (Devillers-Tersch. & Devillers) Kreutz; Ophrys mammosa subsp. macedonica (H.Fleischm. ex Soó) Kreutz; Ophrys mammosa subsp. mouterdeana B.Baumann & H.Baumann; Ophrys mammosa subsp. parviflora Kreutz & H.Heitz; Ophrys mammosa subsp. posteria B.Baumann & H.Baumann; Ophrys mammosa subsp. serotina B.Willing & E.Willing; Ophrys mammosa subsp. taurica (Aggeenko) Soó; Ophrys mammosa subsp. vierhapperi (Soó) Soó; Ophrys morio Paulus & Kreutz; Ophrys mouterdeana (B.Baumann & H.Baumann) P.Delforge; Ophrys osmaniaca (Kreutz) P.Delforge; Ophrys palaestinae Kreutz & Shifman; Ophrys paphlagonica (Kreutz) P.Delforge; Ophrys posteria (B.Baumann & H.Baumann) Devillers & Devillers-Tersch.; Ophrys prespaensis M.Hirth & Paulus; Ophrys pseudomammosa Renz; Ophrys sintenisii H.Fleischm. & Bornm.; Ophrys sphegodes subsp. alasiatica (Kreutz, Segers & H.Walraven) H.Baumann & R.Lorenz; Ophrys sphegodes subsp. caucasica (Woronow ex Grossh.) Soó; Ophrys sphegodes subsp. grammica (B.Willing & E.Willing) Kreutz; Ophrys sphegodes subsp. herae (M.Hirth & H.Spaeth) Kreutz; Ophrys sphegodes subsp. janrenzii (M.Hirth) Kreutz; Ophrys sphegodes subsp. mammosa (Desf.) Soó ex E.Nelson; Ophrys sphegodes subsp. parnassica Soó ex J.J.Wood; Ophrys sphegodes subsp. sintenisii (H.Fleischm. & Bornm.) E.Nelson; Ophrys spruneri var. orientalis Soó; Ophrys taurica (Aggeenko) Nevski; Ophrys transhyrcana subsp. morio (Paulus & Kreutz) Kreutz; Ophrys transhyrcana subsp. mouterdeana (B.Baumann & H.Baumann) Kreutz; Ophrys transhyrcana subsp. paphlagonica Kreutz; Ophrys transhyrcana subsp. sintenisii (H.Fleischm. & Bornm.) Kreutz; Ophrys willingii Paulus & M.Hirth

= Ophrys sphegodes subsp. taurica =

Subspecies of flowering plant

Ophrys sphegodes subsp. taurica, with many synonyms, including Ophrys caucasica, is a subspecies of orchid native from southeast Europe through the Caucasus to Iran. As Ophrys caucasica, it has been recorded in numerous areas throughout Armenia, Azerbaijan, Georgia and Russia. Local names include Armenian: Սարդակիր Մեղվակիր, romanized: Sardakir mexvakir, Azerbaijani: xarı-bülbül Khari-bulbul and Georgian: ფუტკრის-დედა, romanized: put'k'ris-deda.

According to the IUCN Red List, the category and status of the species is "Endangered" – EN B1ab(iii)+2ab(iii).

== Description ==
During various stages of growth, the white petals of Ophrys sphegodes subsp. taurica turn into pink, where various colors (green, yellow, red, etc.) merge together. There are also patterns on the lip.

== Distribution ==
Ophrys sphegodes subsp. taurica is widely distributed. In southeast Europe, it is found in Albania, Bulgaria, East Thrace, Greece, Crimea, Romania and former Yugoslavia. In Western Asia, it is found in Crete, Cyprus, the East Aegean Islands, Iran, Iraq, Lebanon-Syria, the Palestine region and Turkey. It is also native to the North Caucasus and the South Caucasus.

== Local etymology ==
In Armenian, its native name (sardakir mexvakir) refers to its primary pollinators, spiders (sard) and bees (mexu) and their food (kir).

Khara in Azerbaijani is a thick and shiny fabric with different patterns that changes its colors when look at from different angles. Because of these characteristics, the plant acquired its Azerbaijani name, which translates as 'khara nightingale'. The spelling of the word khara becomes khari by requirement of the law of harmony in Azerbaijani.

== Culture ==
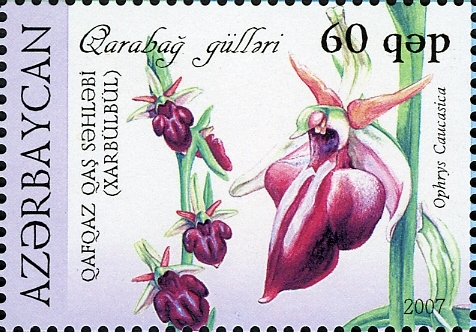
2007 stamp of Azerbaijan depicting the flower

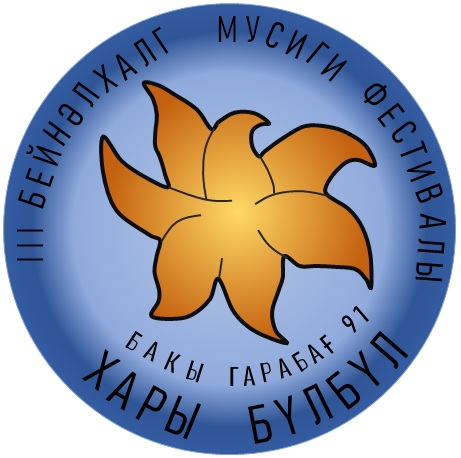
Khari Bulbul Music Festival logo in 1991

In 2014, an exhibition titled "Khari bulbul, a flower of peace and love" was organized by the Federal National Cultural Autonomy of Azerbaijanis in Russia. In March 2014, a presentation ceremony involving Ophrys sphegodes subsp. taurica took place in the United States Botanic Garden Conservatory.
