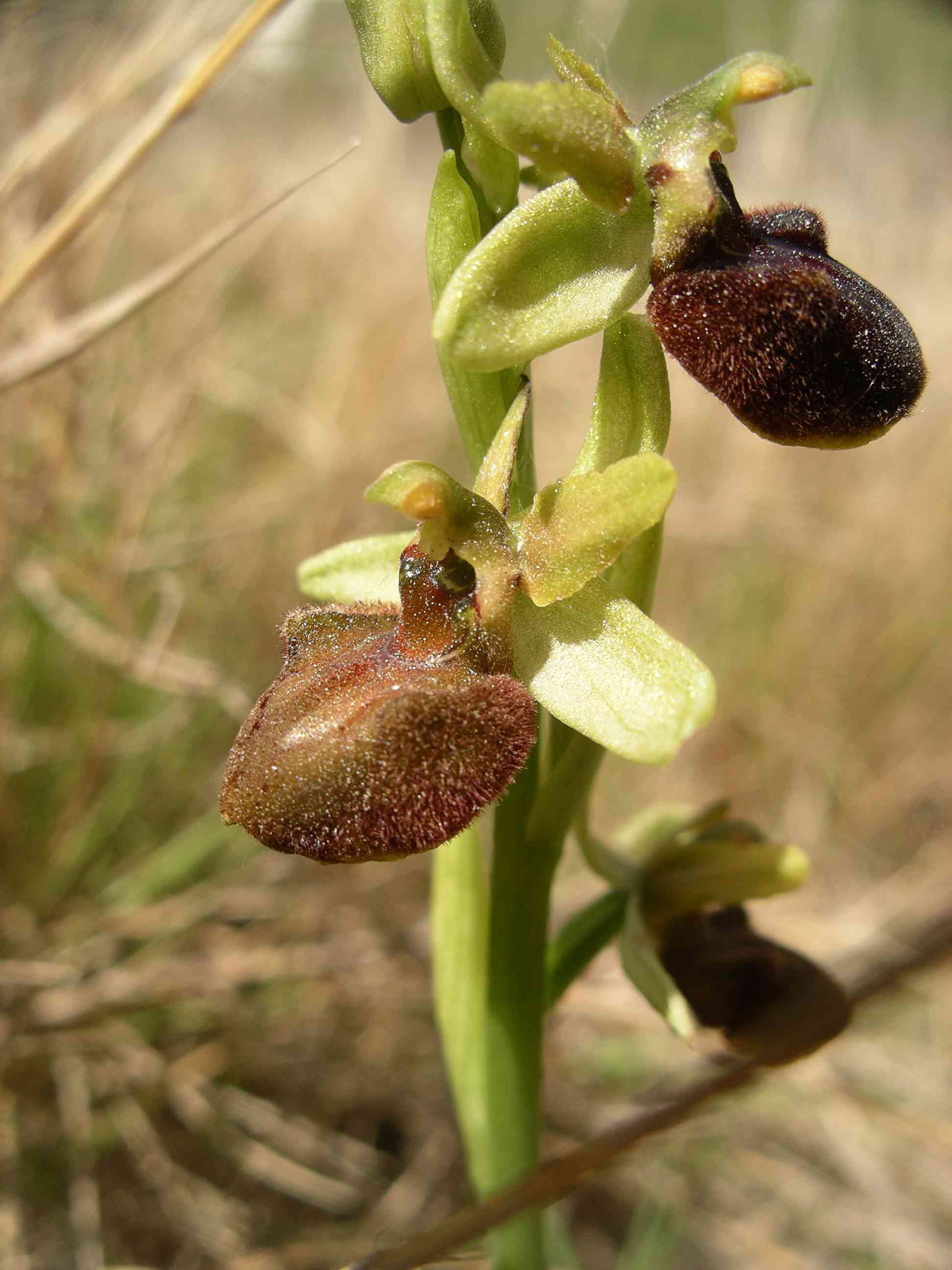

Scientific classification
- Kingdom: Plantae
- Clade: Tracheophytes
- Clade: Angiosperms
- Clade: Monocots
- Order: Asparagales
- Family: Orchidaceae
- Subfamily: Orchidoideae
- Genus: Ophrys
- Species: O. sphegodes

Binomial name
- Ophrys sphegodes Mill.

Synonyms
- List: Arachnites aranifera (Huds.) Bubani 1901; Myodium araniferum (Huds.) Salisb. 1812; Ophrys araneola Rchb. 1831; Ophrys aranifera f. latipetala Chaub. ex St.-Amans 1821; Ophrys aranifera f. oodicheila Renz 1928; Ophrys aranifera f. peralba G .Keller 1912; Ophrys aranifera f. pseudomuscifera Ruppert 1917; Ophrys aranifera f. purpurea A. Camus 1929; Ophrys aranifera f. semilunaris W. Zimm. 1917; Ophrys aranifera Huds. 1778; Ophrys aranifera ssp. litigiosa (E.G. Camus) P. Fourn.; Ophrys aranifera ssp. araneola (Rchb.) K. Richt. 1890; Ophrys aranifera subvar. bavarica Soó 1927; Ophrys aranifera var. aurantiaca Beauverd 1929; Ophrys aranifera var. euchlora J. Murray 1905; Ophrys aranifera var. flavescens M. Schulze 1894; Ophrys aranifera var. quadriloba Rchb.f. 1851; Ophrys aranifera var. rotulata Beck 1890; Ophrys aranifera var. subfucifera Rchb.f. 1851; Ophrys argensonensis J.-C. Guérin & A. Merlet 1998; Ophrys argentaria Devillers-Tersch. & Devillers 1991; Ophrys classica Devillers-Tersch. & Devillers 2000; Ophrys cretensis (H. Baumann & Künkele) Paulus 1988; Ophrys crucigera Jacq. 1784; Ophrys delmeziana P. Delforge 1989; Ophrys exaltata ssp. mateolana (Medagli & al.) Paulus & Gack 1999; Ophrys fuchsii W. Zimm. 1917; Ophrys fucifera Sm. 1830; Ophrys fuciflora Curtis 1778; Ophrys galeopsidea Lag. ex Colmeiro 1889; Ophrys garganica O. Danesch & E. Danesch 1975; Ophrys garganica ssp. passionis (Sennen ex Devillers-Tersch. & Devillers) Paulus & Gack 1999; Ophrys garganica ssp. sipontensis (R. Lorenz & Gembardt) Del Prete 1984; Ophrys gortynia (H. Baumann & Künkele) Paulus 1988; Ophrys hebes (Kalopissis) E. Willing & B. Willing 1980; Ophrys illyrica S. Hertel & K. Hertel 2002; Ophrys incubacea Bianca; Ophrys incubacea ssp. garganica (O. Danesch & E. Danesch) Galesi 2004; Ophrys insectifera var. arachnites L. 1753; Ophrys insectifera var. pallescens Moggr. 1869; Ophrys insectifera var. rubescens Moggr. 1869; Ophrys litigiosa E.G. Camus 1900; Ophrys majellensis (Helga Daiss & Herm. Daiss) P. Delforge 1998; Ophrys massiliensis Viglione & Véla 1999; Ophrys mateolana Medagli & al. 1991; Ophrys melitensis (Salk.) Devillers-Tersch. & Devillers 1994; Ophrys montenegrina (H. Baumann & Künkele) Devillers-Tersch. & Devillers 1991; Ophrys negadensis G. Thiele & W. Thiele 2001; Ophrys passionis Sennen ex Devillers-Tersch. & Devillers 1994; Ophrys passionis ssp. majellensis (Helga Daiss & Herm. Daiss) Romolini & Soca 2000; Ophrys provincialis (H. Baumann & Künkele) Paulus 1988; Ophrys quadriloba (Rchb.f.) E.G. Camus 1908; Ophrys riojana C.E.Hermos., J. Eur. Orch. 31: 881 (1999); Ophrys ruppertii A. Fuchs 1917; Ophrys sipontensis R. Lorenz & Gembardt 1987; Ophrys sphegodes f. latipetala (Chaub. ex St.-Amans) Soó 1971; Ophrys sphegodes f. pseudomuscifera (Ruppert) Soó 1971; Ophrys sphegodes f. subfucifera (Rchb.f.) Soó 1971; Ophrys sphegodes lus. aurantiaca (Beauverd) Soó 1971; Ophrys sphegodes lus. bavarica (Soó) Soó 1971; Ophrys sphegodes lus. euchlora (J. Murray) Soó 1971; Ophrys sphegodes lus. flavescens (M. Schulze) Soó 1971; Ophrys sphegodes lus. pallescens (Moggr.) Soó 1971; Ophrys sphegodes lus. peralba (G. Keller) Soó 1971; Ophrys sphegodes lus. purpurea (A. Camus) Soó 1971; Ophrys sphegodes lus. rotulata (Beck) Soó 1971; Ophrys sphegodes lus. rubescens (Moggr.) Soó 1971; Ophrys sphegodes lus. semilunaris (W. Zimm.) Soó 1971; Ophrys sphegodes ssp. araneola (Rchb.) M. Laínz 1983; Ophrys sphegodes ssp. cretensis H. Baumann & Künkele 1986; Ophrys sphegodes ssp. garganica E. Nelson 1962; Ophrys sphegodes ssp. gortynia H. Baumann & Künkele 1986; Ophrys sphegodes ssp. hebes Kalopissis 1975; Ophrys sphegodes ssp. litigiosa (E.G. Camus) Bech. 1925; Ophrys sphegodes ssp. majellensis Helga Daiss & Herm. Daiss 1997; Ophrys sphegodes ssp. melitensis Salk. 1992; Ophrys sphegodes ssp. montenegrina H. Baumann & Künkele 1988; Ophrys sphegodes ssp. oodicheila (Renz) Riech. 2004; Ophrys sphegodes ssp. passionis (Sennen ex Devillers-Tersch. & Devillers) Sanz & Nuet 1995; Ophrys sphegodes ssp. provincialis H. Baumann & Künkele 1988; Ophrys sphegodes ssp. tommasinii (Vis.) Soó 1971; Ophrys sphegodes var. argentaria (Devillers-Tersch. & Devillers) Faurh. 2002; Ophrys sphegodes var. garganicoides Balayer 1986; Ophrys sphegodes var. gigantea A. Fuchs 1917; Ophrys sphegodes var. subaesculapiana Balayer 1986; Ophrys sphegodes var. subspruneriana Balayer 1986; Ophrys sphegodes var. subtommasiniana Balayer 1986; Ophrys tarquinia P. Delforge 2000; Ophrys tommasinii ssp. araneola (Rchb.) Soó 1980; Ophrys tommasinii ssp. litigiosa (E.G. Camus) Soó 1973; Ophrys tommasinii Vis. 1851; Ophrys vindelica W. Zimm. ex A. Fuchs 1928

= Ophrys sphegodes =

Species of flowering plant in the orchid family

Ophrys sphegodes, commonly known as the early spider-orchid, is a species of sexually-deceptive orchid (through Pouyannian mimicry) native to Europe and the Middle East. It is a highly varied species with many subspecies recognised.

== Description ==
Plant height varies with latitude. In the UK the maximum height is around 20 cm (8 in), but around the Mediterranean a height of 70 cm (28 in) may be reached. Flowers March–May (April–May in northern latitudes). Each shoot may carry between 2 and 18 flowers. The flowers have yellow-green sepals and a velvety red-brown labellum with a distinctive silvery-blue H marking so that the flowers much resemble an arthropod and especially a spider.

Similar to Ophrys fuciflora and Ophrys apifera but flowers differ in that late spider orchid and bee orchid have much smaller petals than sepals; in early spider orchid petals and sepals are a similar size. They are also distinguished by patches of colour on the labellum; late spider orchid has a yellow point at the centre of the distal end of the labellum, while bee orchid has a red patch at the proximal end of the labellum.

== Distribution and habitat ==
Found on unimproved alkaline meadows, woodland edges, as well as slopes, banks and waste land. It is widespread across most of Europe and the middle East from Britain south to Portugal and east to Iran.

In Britain, it is restricted to parts of Dorset, Hampshire, Kent and Sussex and is regarded as rare although where it is found it may be in stands of many hundreds of plants. It is classified as a British Red Data Book plant. Despite its apparent vulnerability, it has very successfully colonised the chalk spoil dumping grounds created near Dover at Samphire Hoe from the excavations of the Channel Tunnel. Worldwide, the IUCN conservation status of this species is least concern as of 2018.

== Ecology ==
In the UK Ophrys sphegodes is pollinated by the miner bee Andrena nigroaenea, a polylectic pollinator (i.e. one that visits many different species of flower), a bee species which requires dry sandy soils. Different subspecies have evolved to attract different pollinators.

This orchid species is able to form symbiotic relationships with a range of species of mycorrhizal fungi.

== Taxonomy ==
Ophrys comes from the Ancient Greek for eyebrow, perhaps a reference to the velvety brown appearance of the labellum. Sphegodes comes from the Ancient Greek for wasp-like. This species was formerly called O. aranifera, meaning spider-carrying.

The genus Ophrys is the most species-rich (i.e. diverse) genus of orchids in Europe and the Mediterranean with over 200 species, according to Orchids of Britain and Europe by Pierre Delforge.

== Subspecies ==
Many subspecific and varietal names have been proposed. At the present time (May 2014), the following are recognized, one of them apparently originating as a hybrid between two of the others:

- Ophrys sphegodes nothosubsp. jeanpertii (E.G.Camus) Del Prete & Conte – France, Spain, Balkans (O. sphegodes subsp. araneola × O. sphegodes subsp. sphegodes)
- Ophrys sphegodes subsp. aesculapii (Renz) Soó ex J.J.Wood – Greece
- Ophrys sphegodes subsp. araneola (Rchb.) M.Laínz – Germany, Switzerland, France, Spain, Italy, Yugoslavia
- Ophrys sphegodes subsp. atrata (Rchb.f.) A.Bolòs – from Portugal to Serbia
- Ophrys sphegodes subsp. aveyronensis J.J.Wood – France, Spain
- Ophrys sphegodes subsp. catalcana Kreutz – European Turkey
- Ophrys sphegodes subsp. cretensis H.Baumann & Künkele – Crete and other Greek islands
- Ophrys sphegodes subsp. epirotica (Renz) Gölz & H.R.Reinhard – Albania, Greece
- Ophrys sphegodes subsp. gortynia H.Baumann & Künkele – Crete and other Greek islands
- Ophrys sphegodes subsp. helenae (Renz) Soó & D.M.Moore – Albania, Greece
- Ophrys sphegodes subsp. mammosa (Desf.) Soó ex E.Nelson – from the Balkans to Turkmenistan
- Ophrys sphegodes subsp. melitensis (Nyman) E.Nelson – the Maltese islands
- Ophrys sphegodes subsp. passionis (Sennen) Sanz & Nuet – France, Spain, Sardinia, Sicily, mainland Italy
- Ophrys sphegodes subsp. sipontensis (R.Lorenz & Gembardt) H.A.Pedersen & Faurh. – Puglia
- Ophrys sphegodes subsp. sphegodes – from Britain and Spain to Hungary and the Balkans
- Ophrys sphegodes subsp. spruneri (Nyman) E.Nelson – Crete and other Greek islands
- Ophrys sphegodes subsp. taurica (Aggeenko) Soó ex Niketic & Djordjevic
- Ophrys sphegodes var. transhyrcana (Czerniak.) P.J.Cribb

== Photo gallery ==
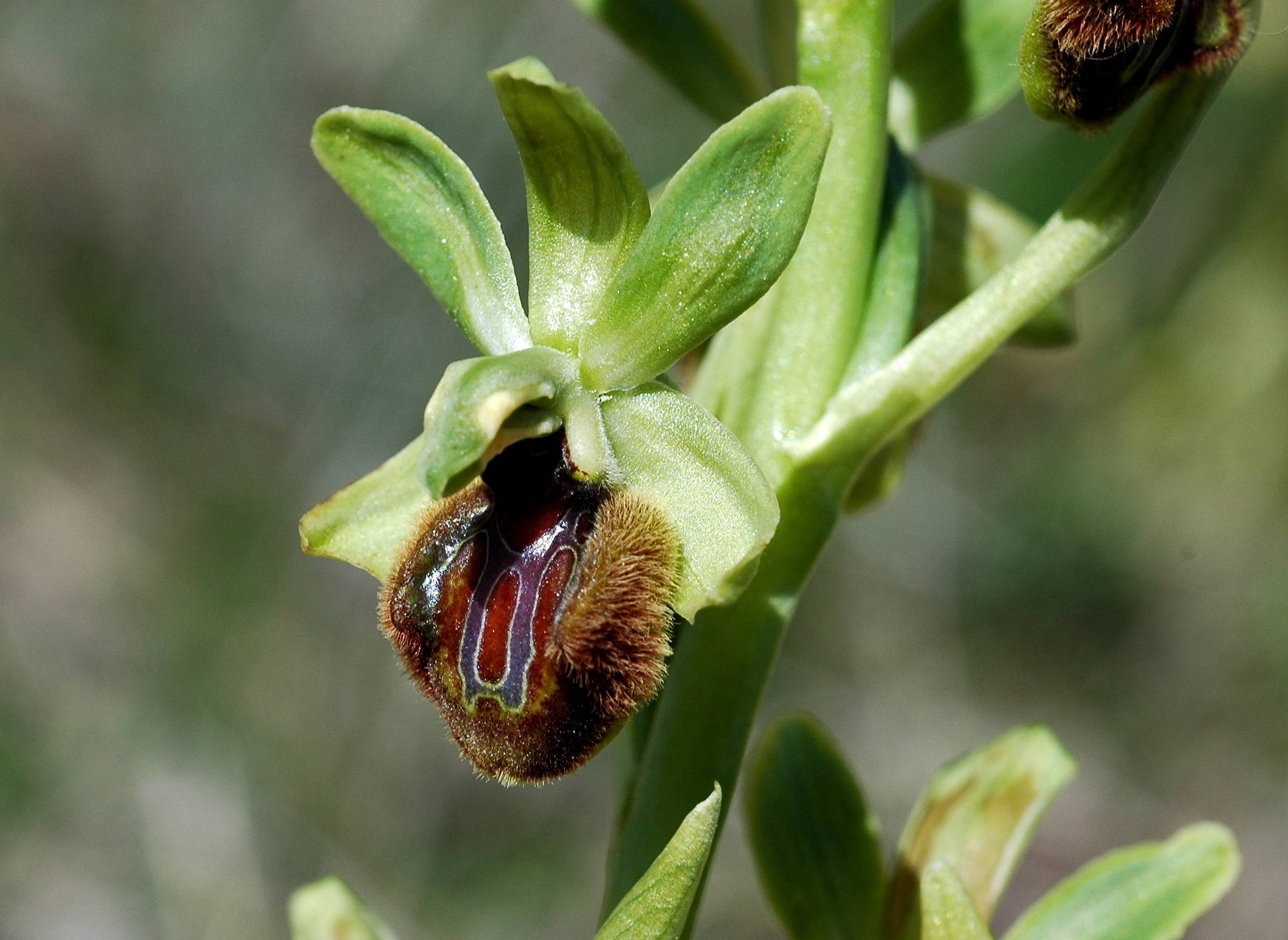

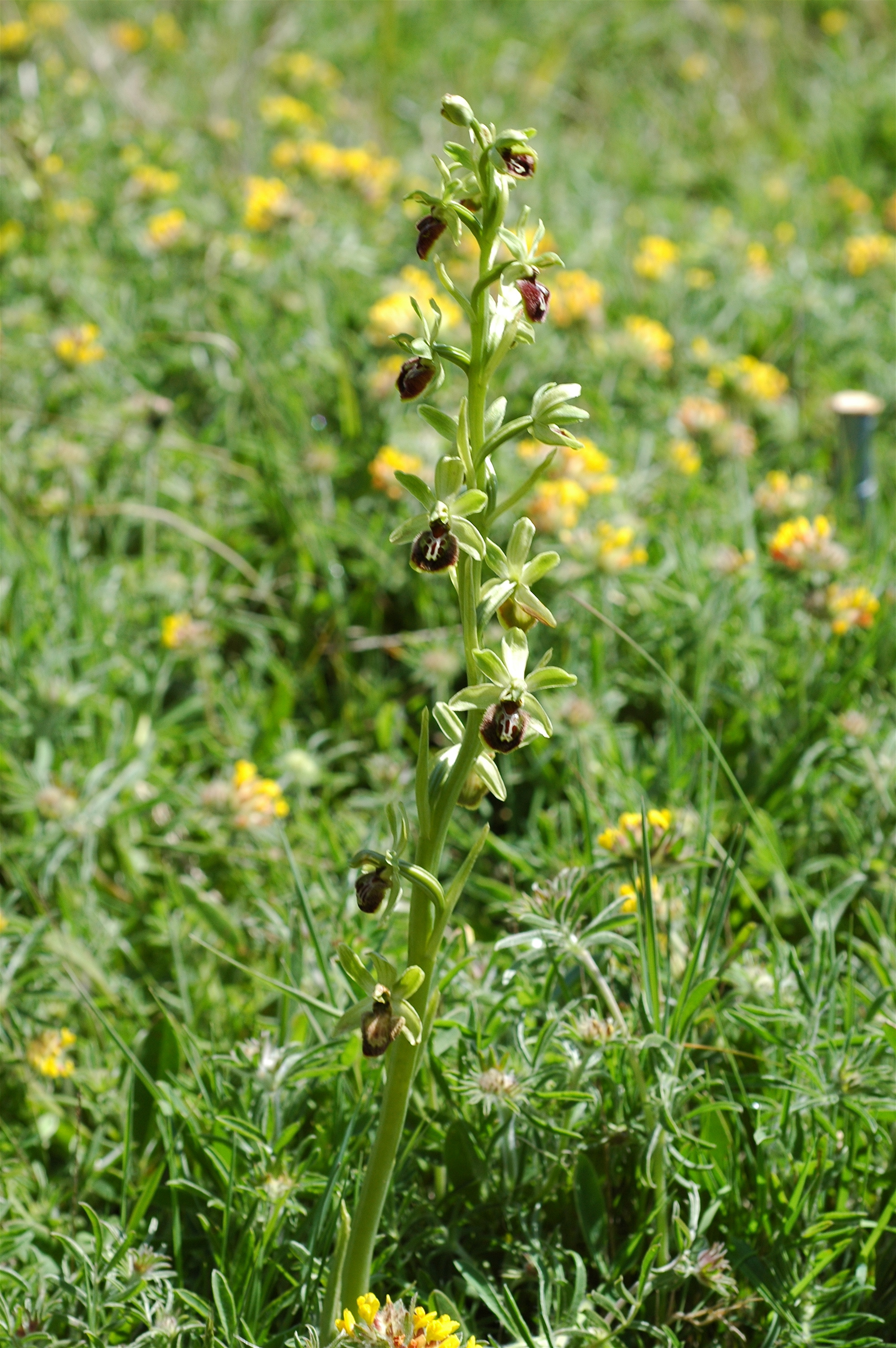

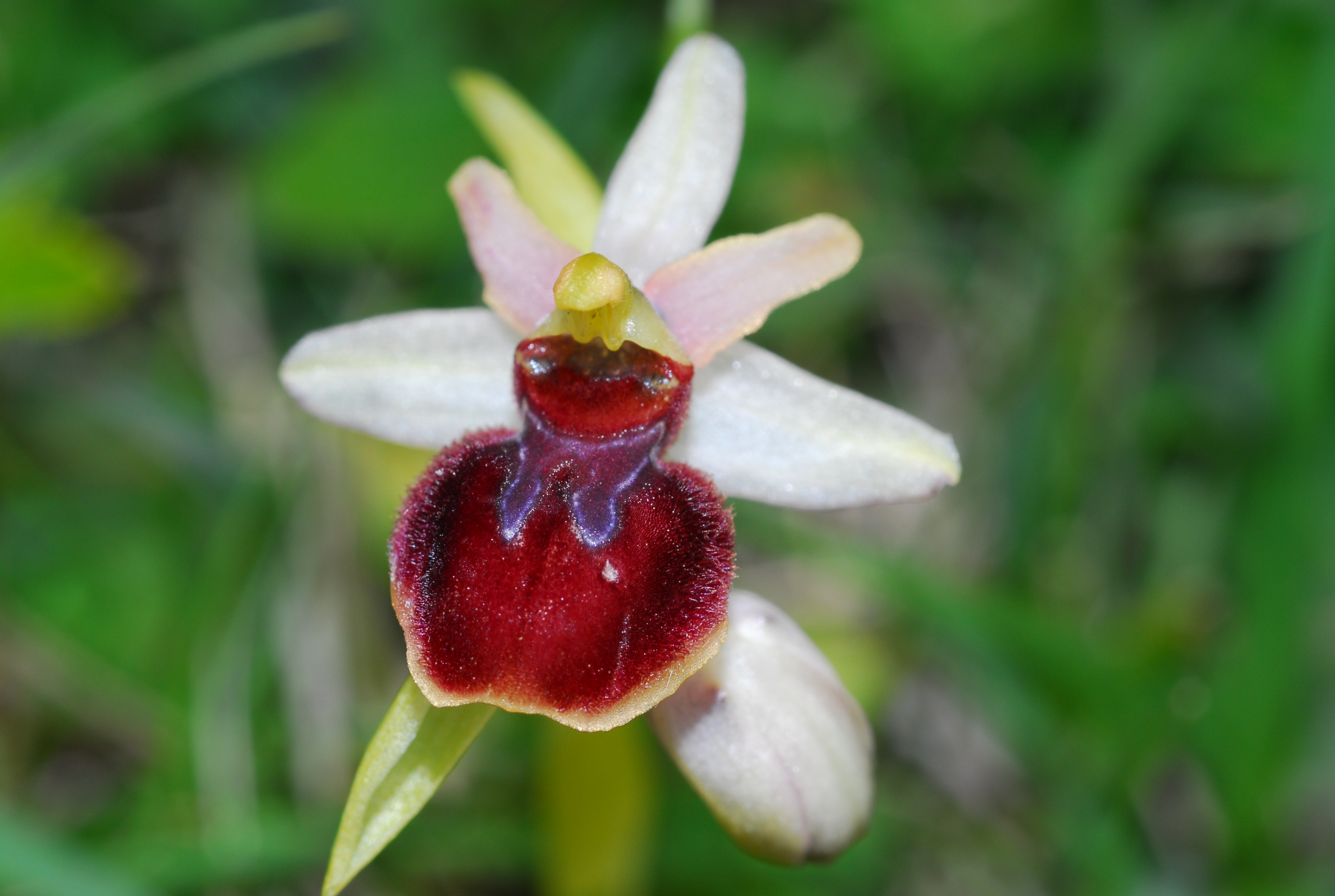

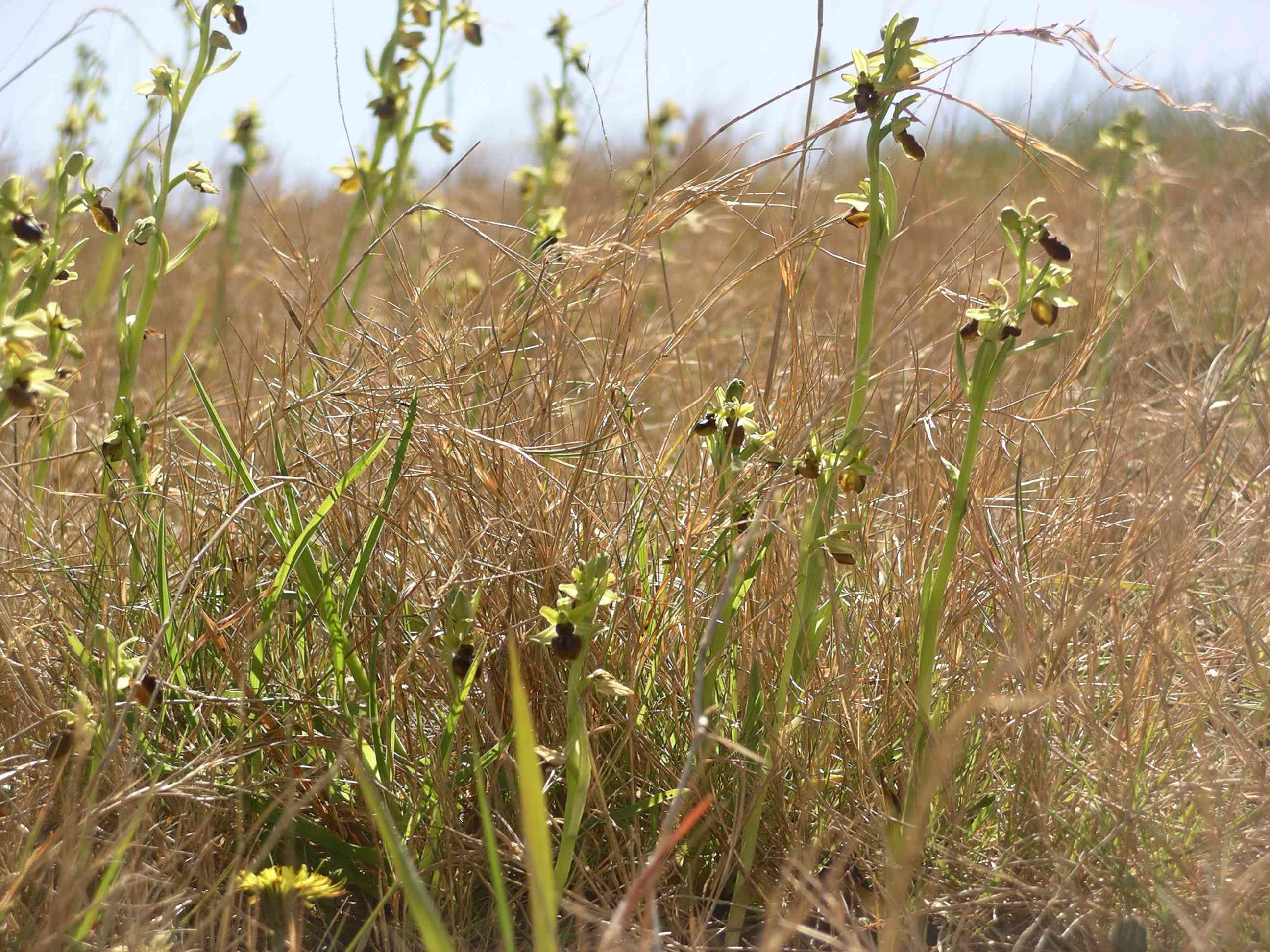
