= San Venanzio, Camerino =

Coordinates: 43.13772°N 13.07354°E

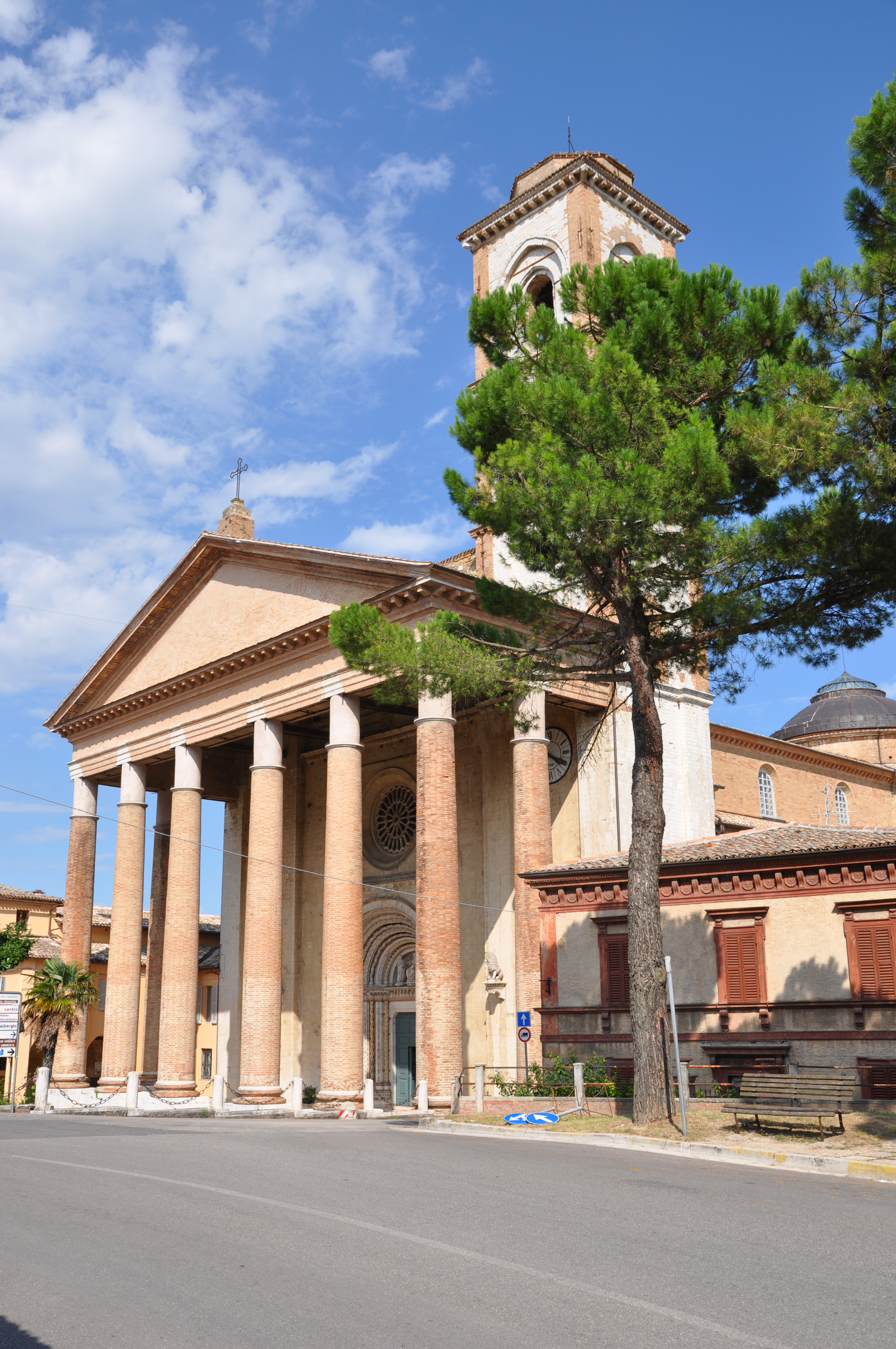
West front of San Venanzio

San Venanzio is a Roman Catholic church built with a late-Gothic structure with Neoclassical restorations, and located in the town of Camerino, province of Macerata, region of Marche, Italy.

== History ==
The present basilica is an exceedingly eclectic assembly of elements from different eras. The facade alone has a Romanesque portal, Gothic rose window, and Neoclassical pronaos. The church structure was significantly damaged during the earthquake of 2016.

The church arose around the tomb of San Venanzio (Venantius of Camerino), and evidence suggests the structure was built atop an Ancient Roman cemetery. After the town was sacked in 1256 by the forces of the Swabian King Manfred, the church was severely damaged and almost entirely destroyed, . The relics of the saint were purloined to Bari for nearly a decade. The church was originally located outside the early medieval walls, but later protected by the new walls erected in 1384 by the lord Giovanni Varano.

Nearly all the structures in the town had to be rebuilt, including the mausoleum of San Venanzio. Documents from late 14th century to 1412 recall paying for statues of the St Gabriel and the Virgin of the Annunciation. Reconstruction of the facade were commissioned from Polidoro di Stefano from Perugia, and the tympanum was added in 1480. The portal is concave with receding arches flanked by pilasters and columns. A new crypt and larger apse rebuilt in the late 16th century, maintaining the Gothic layout. Some of the designs attributed to Domenico Fontana. The choir was added in 1558. The dome dates to baroque era (1673-1677) by architect Bernardino Bianchini.

The next further reconstruction took place in the century after the earthquake of 1799. Many of the fallen elements are still conserved by the church. The Latin cross interior, was rebuilt in neoclassical style, divided into three naves by two rows of columns. A barrel vault in the central nave, with a series of stucco frames, while aisles covered with coffered ceilings boxes. The architect was Luigi Poletti who also planned on building a second bell-tower.

The altar in the crypt consists of the sarcophagus which was decorated in the late 13th and early 14th centuries. The sarcophagus, supported by four black marble griffins is crouched in black marble and located in the corners. It is placed the ark of San Venanzio, attributed to Tuscan artists, built with limestone upon solomonic columns. The silver statue of the saint was commissioned by Bishop Francesco Vivani in 1764.
