= Piergiorgio Nesti =

Italian Catholic archbishop

Piergiorgio Silvano Nesti CP
- Archbishop of Camerino-San Severino Marche
- Church: Catholic Church
- Archdiocese: Archdiocese of Camerino-San Severino Marche
- In office: 23 July 1993 – 27 November 1996
- Predecessor: Francesco Gioia
- Successor: Angelo Fagiani
- Other post: Secretary for Congregation for Institutes of Consecrated Life and Societies of Apostolic Life (1996-2006)

Orders
- Ordination: 30 August 1959 by Giovanni Battista Peruzzo
- Consecration: 29 August 1993 by Angelo Felici

Personal details
- Born: 18 February 1931 Marostica, Province of Vicenza, Kingdom of Italy
- Died: 13 December 2009 (aged 78) Rome, Italy

Piergiorgio Silvano Nesti (18 February 1931 – 13 December 2009) was an Italian Roman Catholic archbishop.

Ordained on 30 August 1959, Nesti was appointed archbishop of the Roman Catholic Archdiocese of Camerino-San Severino Marche on 23 July 1993 and was ordained bishop on 30 August 1993. On 27 November 1996, Pope John Paul II appointed Nesti Secretary of the Congregation for Institutes of Consecrated Life and Societies of Apostolic Life. Nesti retired from this final position on 10 July 2006.
