= Giulio Cesare da Varano =

Italian military leader (1434–1502)

Giulio Cesare da Varano (1434–1502) was an Italian condottiero who ruled the city state of Camerino from 1447 until his death in 1502.

== Life ==
He was the son of Giovanni II da Varano and Bartolomea Smeducci di Sanseverino. He was rescued from the general massacre of his family (the da Varano massacre) by his aunt, and he was sent to live in Fabriano to ensure his safety. In 1447, he inherited the lordship of Camerino and shared this title with his cousin, Rodolfo. He entered in military service, fighting first for the Republic of Florence and then for Siena, in order to capture Jacopo Piccinino. He fought for Pope Pius II against the king of Naples and, in 1469, he was at the side of the papal troops in opposition to Rimini, but was defeated twice. In 1464 he was widely suspected of murdering his cousin Rodolfo, by poisoning him, in order to secure sole rulership of Camerino.

He would become an enemy of Pope Alexander VI and his son, Cesare Borgia. In 1502, he was captured by Borgia and killed alongside his sons, Venanzio, Annibale and Pirro. After Borgia's fall from power Camerino would be ruled by Giulio Cesare' son, Giovanni Maria da Varano, as the Duke of Camerino.
