= Francesco Giovanni Brugnaro =

Italian prelate of the Catholic Church

- Archbishop Emeritus of Camerino-San Severino Marche
- Church: Catholic Church
- Archdiocese: Archdiocese of Camerino-San Severino Marche
- In office: 3 September 2007 – 27 July 2018
- Predecessor: Angelo Fagiani
- Successor: Francesco Massara

Orders
- Ordination: 18 December 1982 by Carlo Maria Martini
- Consecration: 29 September 2007 by Pope Benedict XVI

Personal details
- Born: 16 March 1943 (age 83) San Donà di Piave, Province of Venice, Kingdom of Italy
- Coat of arms

Francesco Giovanni Brugnaro (born 16 March 1943) is an Italian prelate of the Catholic Church who served as Archbishop of Camerino-San Severino Marche from 2007 to 2018.

== Biography ==
Brugnaro was born on 16 March 1943 in Padua. He was ordained a priest of the Archdiocese of Milan on 18 December 1982.

On 24 April 2002, he was named office chief of the Congregation for the Oriental Churches, where he was already working.

On 31 January 2005, Pope John Paul II named him the Permanent Observer of the Holy See to the World Tourism Organization (UNWTO).

Pope Benedict XVI appointed him Archbishop of Camerino-San Severino Marche on 3 September 2007. He was consecrated a bishop on 29 September by Pope Benedict with Cardinals Tarcisio Bertone and Marian Jaworski as co-consecrators.

Pope Francis accepted his resignation on 27 July 2018.
