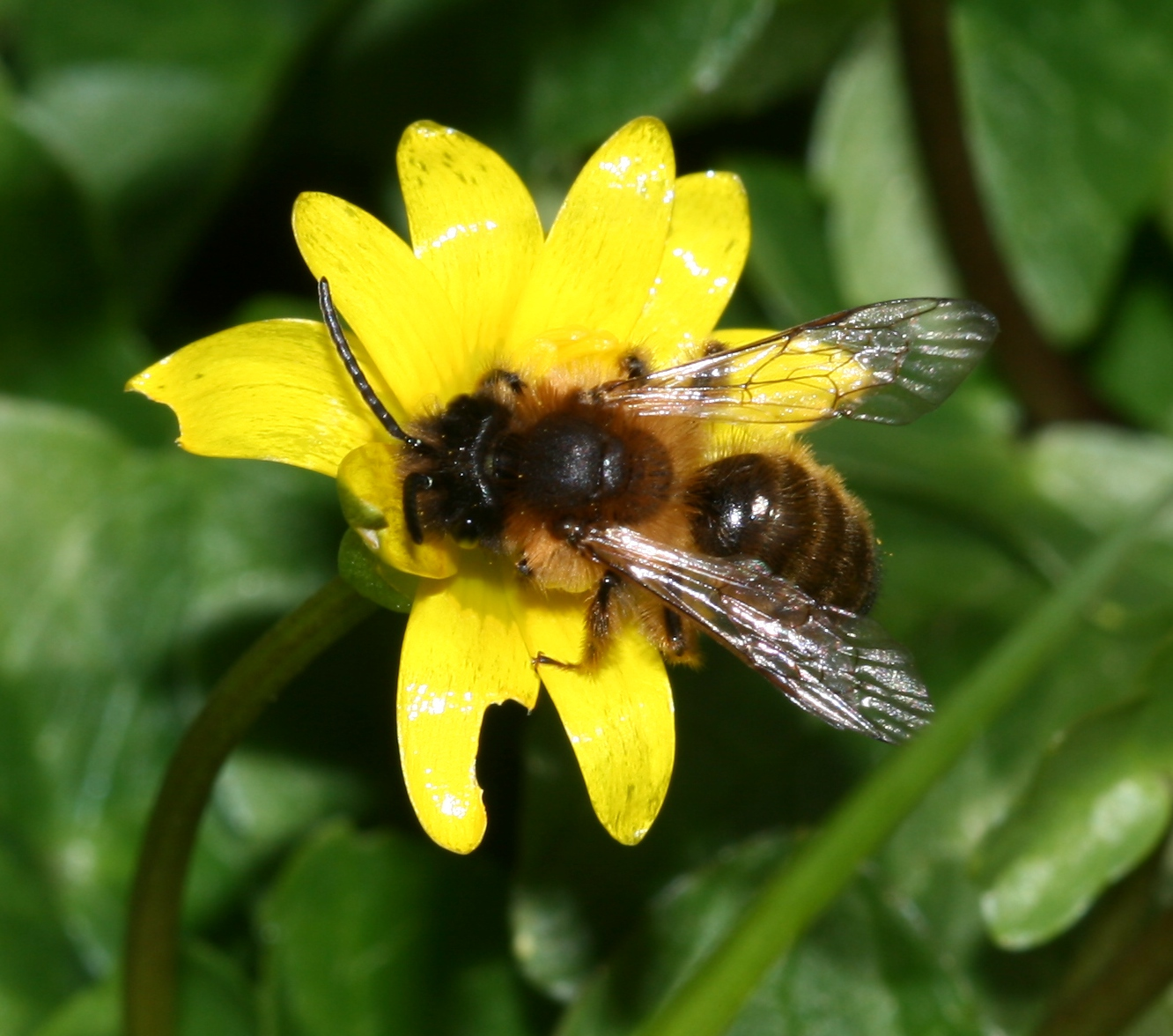
- Andrena cf. nigroaenea male

Conservation status
- Least Concern (IUCN 3.1)

Scientific classification
- Kingdom: Animalia
- Phylum: Arthropoda
- Clade: Pancrustacea
- Class: Insecta
- Order: Hymenoptera
- Family: Andrenidae
- Genus: Andrena
- Species: A. nigroaenea

Binomial name
- Andrena nigroaenea (Kirby, 1802)

= Andrena nigroaenea =

Species of bee

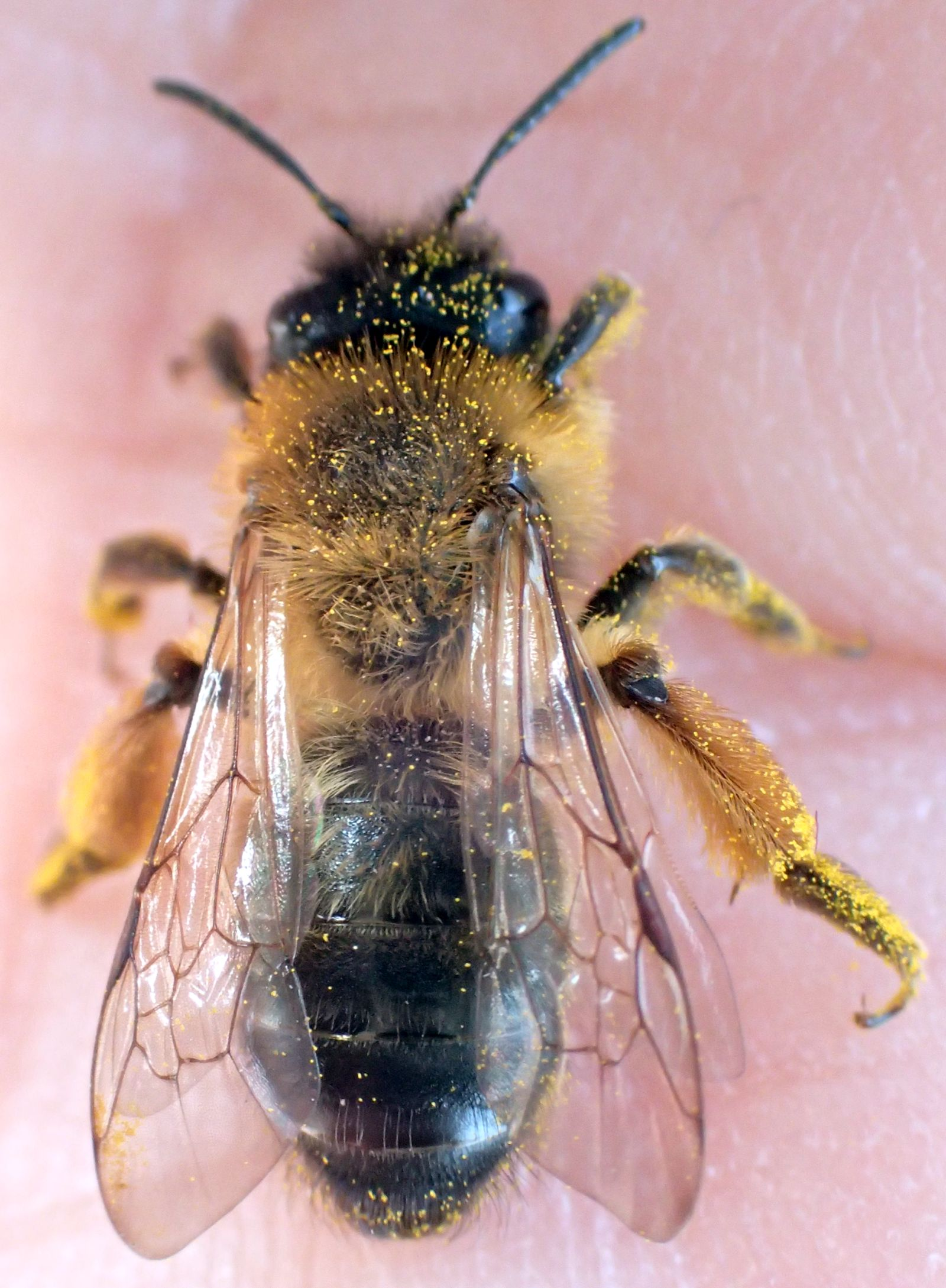
The hind tibiae of Andrena nigroaenea female are dark but have very dense and neat orange pollen brushes

Andrena nigroaenea also known as buffish mining bee is a Palearctic species of mining bee.
