= Ansovinus =

Bishop of Camerino; Catholic saint

Saint Ansovinus
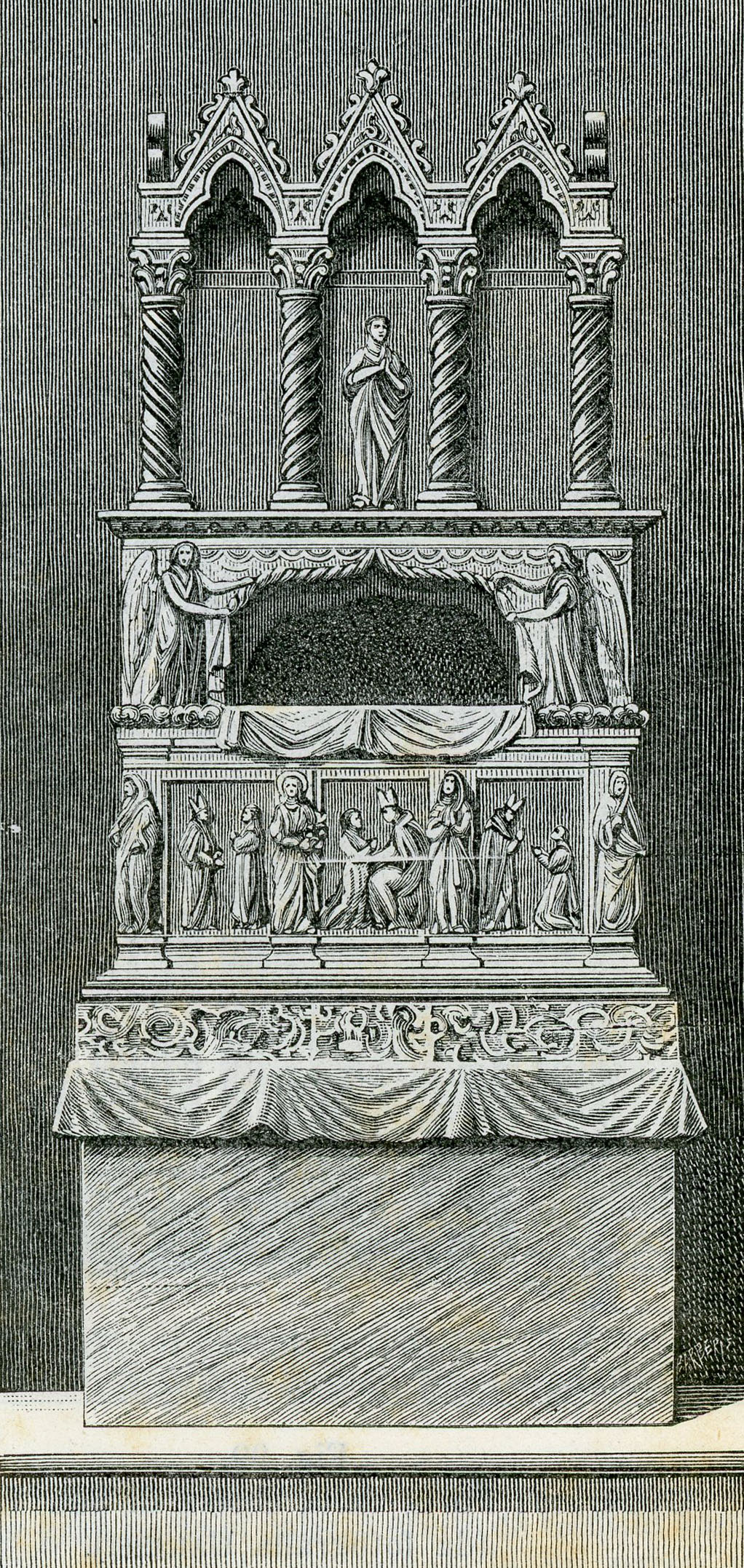
- Mausoleum of St. Ansovinus, Cathedral of Camerino.
- Died: 816
- Venerated in: Roman Catholic Church
- Feast: 13 March
- Attributes: bishop with a barn near him; fruit and garden produce
- Patronage: gardeners; invoked for good harvests

Saint Ansovinus (Italian: Sant'Ansovino) (d. 816) was a bishop of Camerino, and is the patron saint of agriculture. His feast day is 13 March.

== Life ==
He was educated at the cathedral school of Pavia. After ordination to the priesthood, he became a hermit at Castel Raimondo near Torcello.

Before being elected bishop of Camerino, he served as confessor to Louis II, Holy Roman Emperor. Ansovinus refused to accept the office of bishop until Louis was agreed that his see be kept exempt from the conscription of the locals into the soldiery. During this time, bishops were often required to be responsible for recruiting men for the imperial army.

He was consecrated at Rome by Pope Leo IV, and returned to this city for the Council of Rome held by Pope Nicholas I in 861, where records show he signed as Ansuinus Camerinensis. His episcopate was characterized by his generosity to the poor and his pacification of the city's various factions.

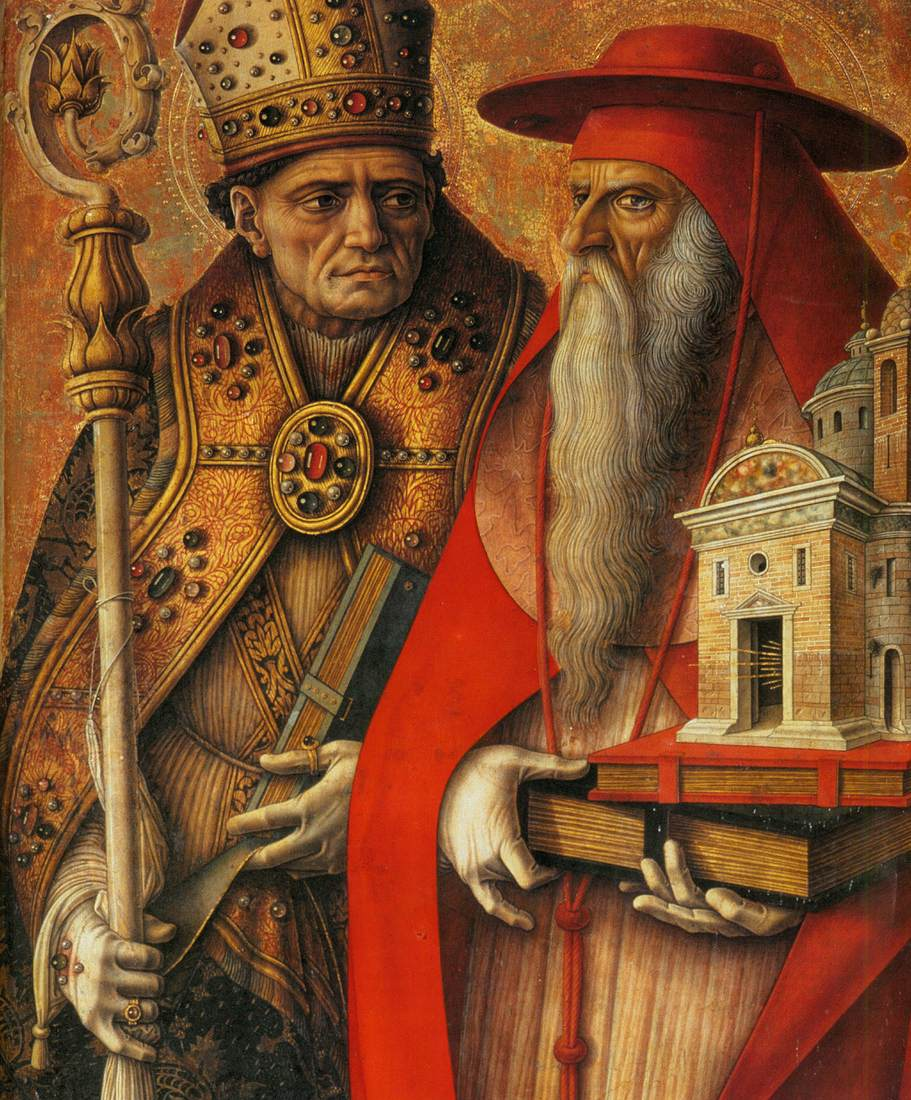
St Ansovinus and St Jerome(detail), Crivelli

The gift of multiplying food was attributed to Ansovinus. He fed thousands of starving people from the regional granary at Castel Raimondo, but the grain never ran out.

== Veneration ==
His feast day is 13 March. The cathedral at Camerino includes the marble medieval arch of Sant'Ansovino. A monumental sarcophagus erected around 1390 holds his relics. His festival was once celebrated by Camerino and the nobles of other castles in the region. The church of Santi Venanzio e Ansovino at Rome was dedicated to him. Additionally, there are rural churches dedicated to him at Avacelli, Casenove, Bevagna, and Monsammartino.

Ansovinus is the patron saint of small farmers.
