= University of Camerino =

University in Camerino, Italy

Coordinates: 43°08′09″N 13°04′07″E

- Università degli Studi di Camerino
- Latin: Camerinum Universitas
- Type: State-supported
- Established: 1337; As university 1723
- Affiliations: UNIMED
- Rector: Prof. Graziano Leoni
- Administrative staff: 620
- Students: 10,000
- Location: Camerino, Italy
- Sports teams: CUS Camerino
- Colours: Red and night blue
- Website: www.unicam.it/

The University of Camerino (Italian: Università degli Studi di Camerino) is a university located in Camerino, Italy. The Guida Censis Repubblica ranked it in 2011 and 2012 as the best Italian university among those with fewer than 10,000 students. It claims to have been founded in 1337 and was officially recognized by the Pope in 1723. It is organized into five faculties.

== History ==
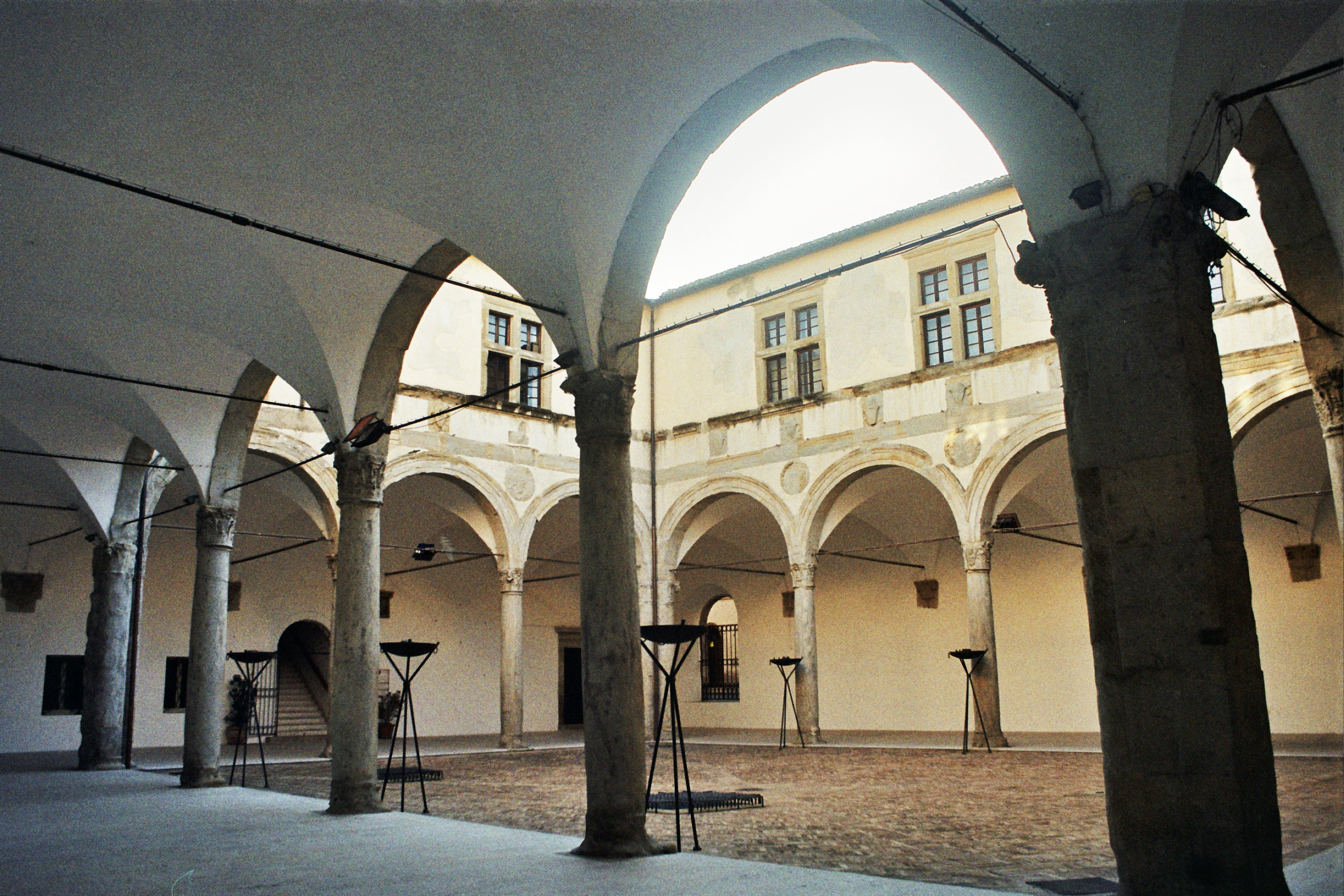
University of Camerino

Writer and jurist Cino from Pistoia, living in Marche in the years 1319–22, and in Camerino in the spring of 1331, described the territory as teeming with law schools. Camerino became a center of learning by year 1205, offering degrees in civil law, canonical law, medicine, and literary studies. Upon the request of Gentile III da Varano, Gregory XI issued the papal edict of 29 January 1367, addressed to the municipality and to the people, authorizing Camerino to confer (after appropriate examination) bachelor and doctoral degrees with apostolic authority, although only in legal studies and only for a limited period. After Camerino lost its importance as a political centre, the university declined and had vanished by 1600.

In 1723, Benedict XIII founded the Universitas Studii Generalis with the faculties of theology, jurisprudence, medicine, and mathematics. On 13 April 1756 the validity of the degrees from Camerino was extended to the whole territory of the Holy Roman Empire and the title of palatine count bestowed on the vice-chancellor. In 1871, after annexation by the Kingdom of Italy, the university was proclaimed "free" and it remained so up to 1959, when it became a State University.

== Organization ==
These are the five faculties into which the university is divided into:

- School of Architecture and Design (located in Ascoli Piceno)
- School of Law
- School of Pharmacy
- School of Science and Technology
- School of Biosciences and Veterinary Medicine

== Campus ==
Students enrolled at the University of Camerino may live on campus. Its location is in the north of Camerino at the city's border. On the campus there are apartments for two or more people, each with separate bedrooms, a kitchen, and a bathroom. A shuttle bus (regular bus line) takes the students with a valid Unicam bus ticket into the city center for free.

== See also ==
- List of early modern universities in Europe
- List of Italian universities
- Camerino
