= Ludovico Clodio =

Most Reverend Ludovico Clodio
- Bishop of Nocera Umbra
- Church: Catholic Church
- Diocese: Diocese of Nocera
- In office: 1508–1514
- Predecessor: Matteo Baldeschi
- Successor: Guarino Favorino

Personal details
- Died: July 1514

Ludovico Clodio (died 1514) was a Roman Catholic prelate who served as Bishop of Nocera Umbra (1508–1514).

== Biography ==
On 28 July 1508, Ludovico Clodio was appointed by Pope Julius II as Bishop of Nocera Umbra. He served as Bishop of Nocera Umbra until his death in July 1514.

== External links and additional sources ==
- Cheney, David M. "Diocese of Nocera Umbra-Gualdo Tadino". Catholic-Hierarchy.org. (for Chronology of Bishops) ^{[self-published]}
- Chow, Gabriel. "Diocese of Nocera Umbra-Gualdo Tadino (Italy)". GCatholic.org. (for Chronology of Bishops) ^{[self-published]}

Catholic Church titles
Preceded by Matteo Baldeschi	Bishop of Nocera Umbra; 1508–1514	Succeeded by Guarino Favorino
