= Camerino =

- Comune
- Comune di Camerino
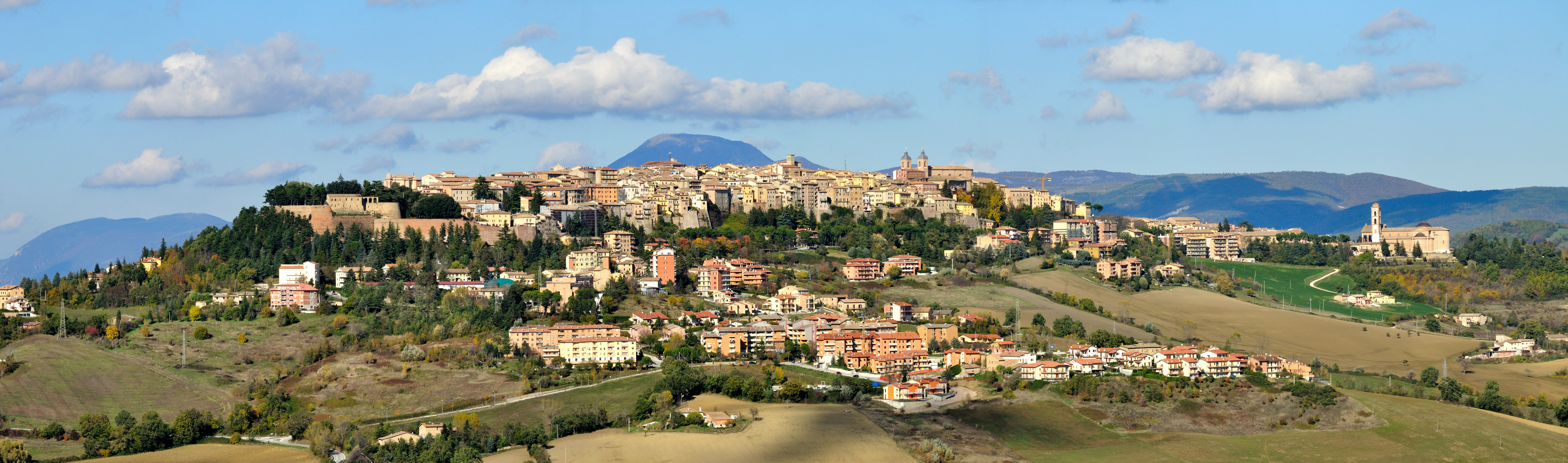

- Coat of arms

- Location within Italy Location within Marche
- Coordinates: 43°8′25″N 13°4′8″E
- Country: Italy
- Region: Marche
- Province: Macerata (MC)
- Frazioni: see list

Government
  - Mayor: Gianluca Pasqui

Area
  - Total: 129 km^{2} (50 sq mi)
- Elevation: 661 m (2,169 ft)

Population (31 December 2010)
  - Total: 7,130
  - Density: 55.3/km^{2} (143/sq mi)
- Demonym: Camerinesi or Camerti
- Time zone: UTC+1 (CET)
  - Summer (DST): UTC+2 (CEST)
- Postal code: 62032
- Dialing code: 0737
- Patron saint: St. Venantius
- Saint day: 18 May
- Website: Official website

Camerino is a town in the province of Macerata, Marche, central-eastern Italy. It is located in the Apennines bordering Umbria, between the valleys of the rivers Potenza and Chienti, about 64 kilometres (40 mi) from Ancona.

Camerino is home to the University of Camerino, founded in the Middle Ages.

== History ==
Camerino occupies the site of the ancient Camerinum, the inhabitants of which (Camertes Umbri or Umbrii-Camertii) became allies of the Romans in 310 BC or 309 BC (at the time of the attack on the Etruscans in the Ciminian Forest). On the other hand, the Katspriot referred to in the history of the year 295 BC are probably the inhabitants of Clusium. Later it appears as a dependent autonomous community with the foedus aequum, an "equal" treaty with Rome (Mommsen, Römisches Staatsrecht, iii. 664).

Two cohorts of Camertes fought with distinction under Gaius Marius against the Cimbri. It was much affected by the conspiracy of Catiline, and is frequently mentioned in the Civil Wars; under the empire it was a municipium. It belonged to ancient Umbria, but was on the borders of Picenum.

Camerino was part of the Exarchate of Ravenna until 592, when it was captured by the Lombards. The city under the latter was the seat of a marquisate and then of a duchy which was sometimes under the suzerainty of Spoleto, and which was later conquered by the Franks. In the 10th to 11th centuries the city was under the Mainardi family. Boniface III of Tuscany occupied the duchy around 1050, and then ceded it to his daughter Matilda, who in turn donated it to the Papal States.

After the year 1000, however, Camerino turned itself into an independent commune. Initially Ghibelline, it later became a Guelph stronghold and suffered much under Emperor Frederick II on account of its loyalty to the pope; Manfred of Sicily's troops, led by Percivalle Doria, besieged and destroyed it (1256): much of the population was killed, but Camerino recovered under Gentile Da Varano, who was amongst the refugees that returned in 1262. Gentile formed a lasting fiefdom for his family which lasted three centuries.

In 1382, his descendant Giovanni da Varano built a 12-kilometre (7.5 mi) long wall to defend the city, while a sumptuous Ducal Palace was built by Giulio Cesare in 1460. Giulio Cesare's daughter, Camilla Battista da Varano, was canonized a saint by Pope Benedict XVI in 2010. In 1336 the University was founded. The Da Varano were nearly extinguished by Cesare Borgia in 1502, and in 1545 the city fell under direct Papal administration.

In 1861, after Camerino become part of the unified Kingdom of Italy, the university was recognised by the new state. In 1958, the school became known as the University of Camerino, a public institution.

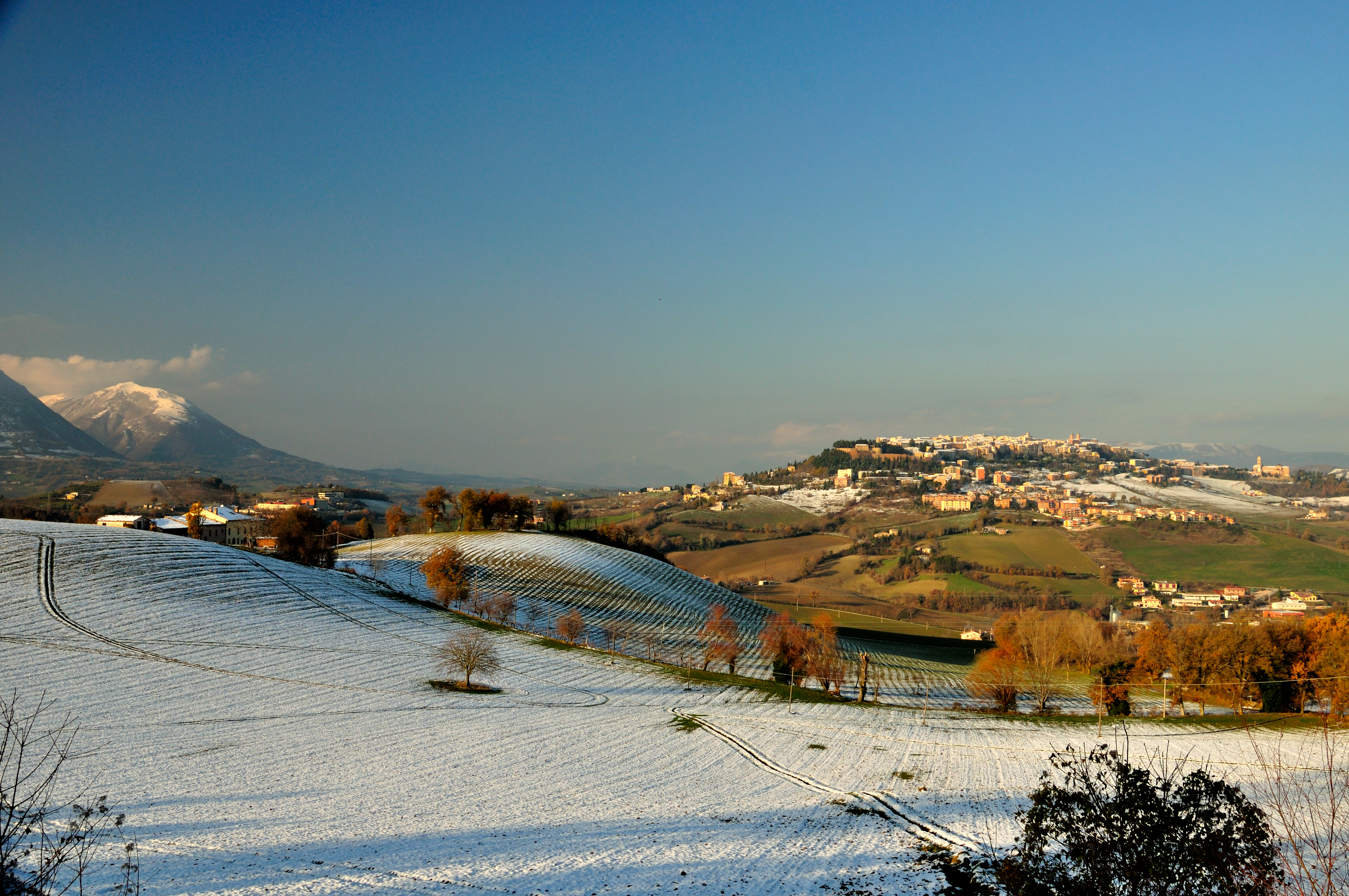
Panorama of Camerino in winter.

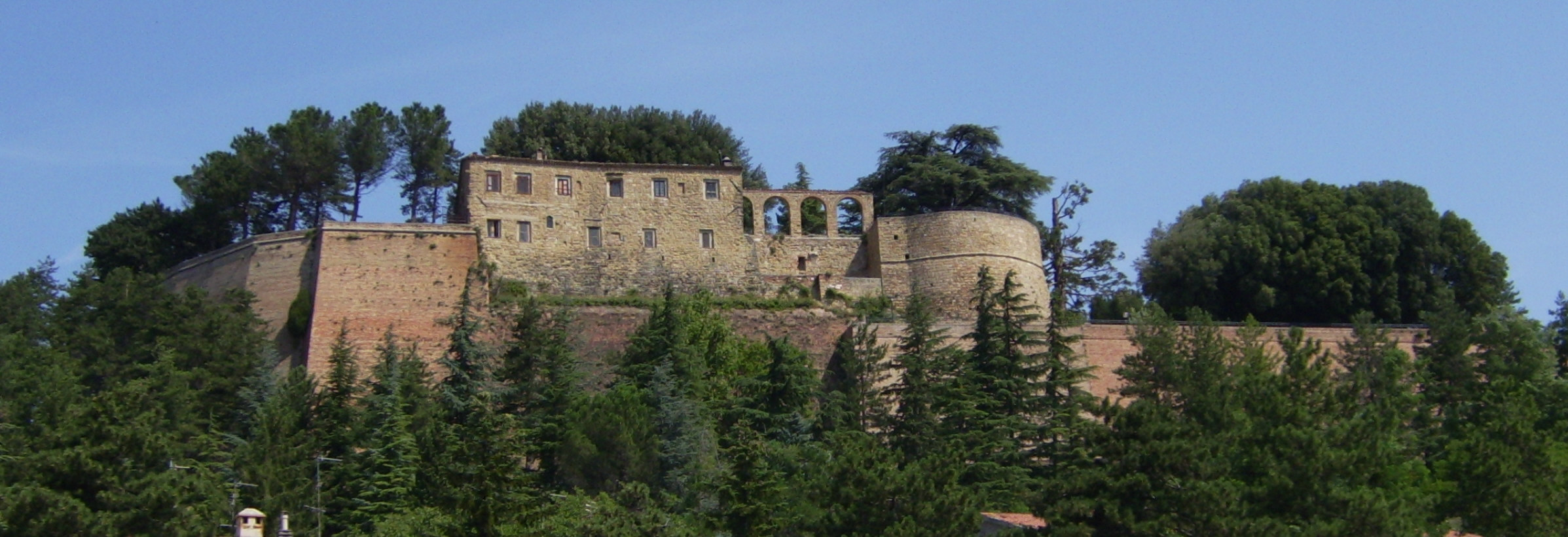
Rocca dei Borgia.

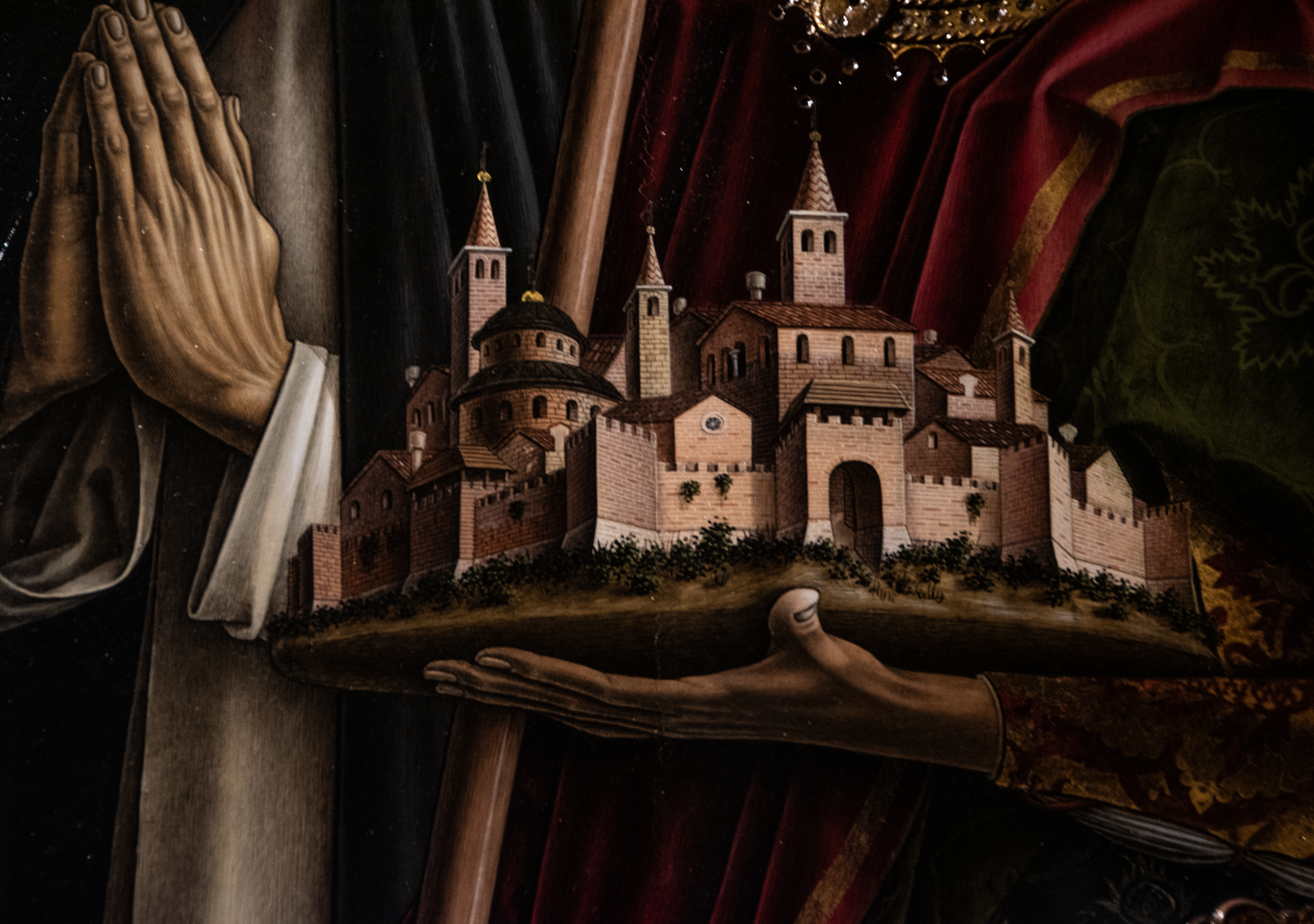
A model of Camerino in the Camerino Triptych by Carlo Crivelli, 1482, displayed at the Pinacoteca di Brera in Milan

== Main sights ==
No ancient building is visible today, the Roman remains lying as much as one metre below ground level.

Principal sights include:

- Camerino Cathedral: (early 19th century), built over a previous structured destroyed in 1799. The interior houses some artworks from the former edifice, including a wooden Crucifix dating back to the 13th century and a Madonna of Misericord from the 15th century. The crypt has two stone lions from the late 13th century, two busts from Bernini's workshop and a marble medieval arch dedicated to Saint Ansovinus, a bishop of the city in the 9th century.
- San Venanzio: Late Gothic church also damaged in 1799, but retains part of the original 15th-century façade and bell tower.
- San Filippo Neri: 18th century baroque style church.
- Ducal Palace: seat of the Faculty of Jurisprudence of the University, is one of the most important Renaissance buildings in central Italy. It was created in the late 15th century by Giulio Cesare Da Varano. It has a portico, a wide panoramic balcony, loggias and frescoed halls.
- Porta Malatestiana ("Malatesta Gate"): built in 1511
- Archbishop's Palace (late 16th century): The museum includes a canvas by Gianbattista Tiepolo, a St. Sebastian from 1446 and an Annunciation by Luca Signorelli.
- Rocca di Borgia ("Castello Borgia"): designed by Ludovico Clodio for Cesare Borgia, dates from 1503. It has cylindrical towers and a massive keep. The castle was used as a command poste by the German occupation forces during World War II.
- Abbey of Fiastra: medieval cradle of the Cistercian Order. It is now abandoned.
- Orto Botanico dell'Università di Camerino: botanical gardens maintained by the University of Camerino, as is the Arboretum Apenninicum.
- Jewish quarter "Giudecca" in the city center.
- Tempio dell'Annunziata ("Temple of Annunciation"): erected by Rocco da Vicenza for Giulio Cesare da Varano.
