= Ramon Riu i Cabanes =

Bishop of Urgell, ex-officio Co-Prince of Andorra

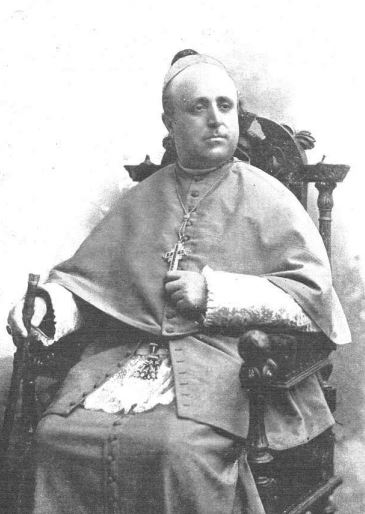

Ramon Riu i Cabanes (17 June 1852 – 27 December 1901) was Bishop of Urgell and ex officio Co-Prince of Andorra in 1901. Born in 1852 in Solsona, he was appointed Apostolic Administrator of the Diocese of Solsona and Titular Bishop of Tamasus in 1895. In April 1901, he succeeded Salvador Casañas y Pagés as Bishop of Urgell and ecclesiastical Co-Prince of Andorra; however, he died just a few months after taking office.

Catholic Church titles
Preceded by Salvador Casañas i Pagés	Bishop of Urgell; 1901	Succeeded by Joan Josep Laguarda i Fenollera
Regnal titles
Preceded by Salvador Casañas i Pagés	Co-Prince of Andorra; 1901; Served alongside: Émile Loubet	Succeeded by Joan Josep Laguarda i Fenollera
