= Santi Quirico e Giulitta =

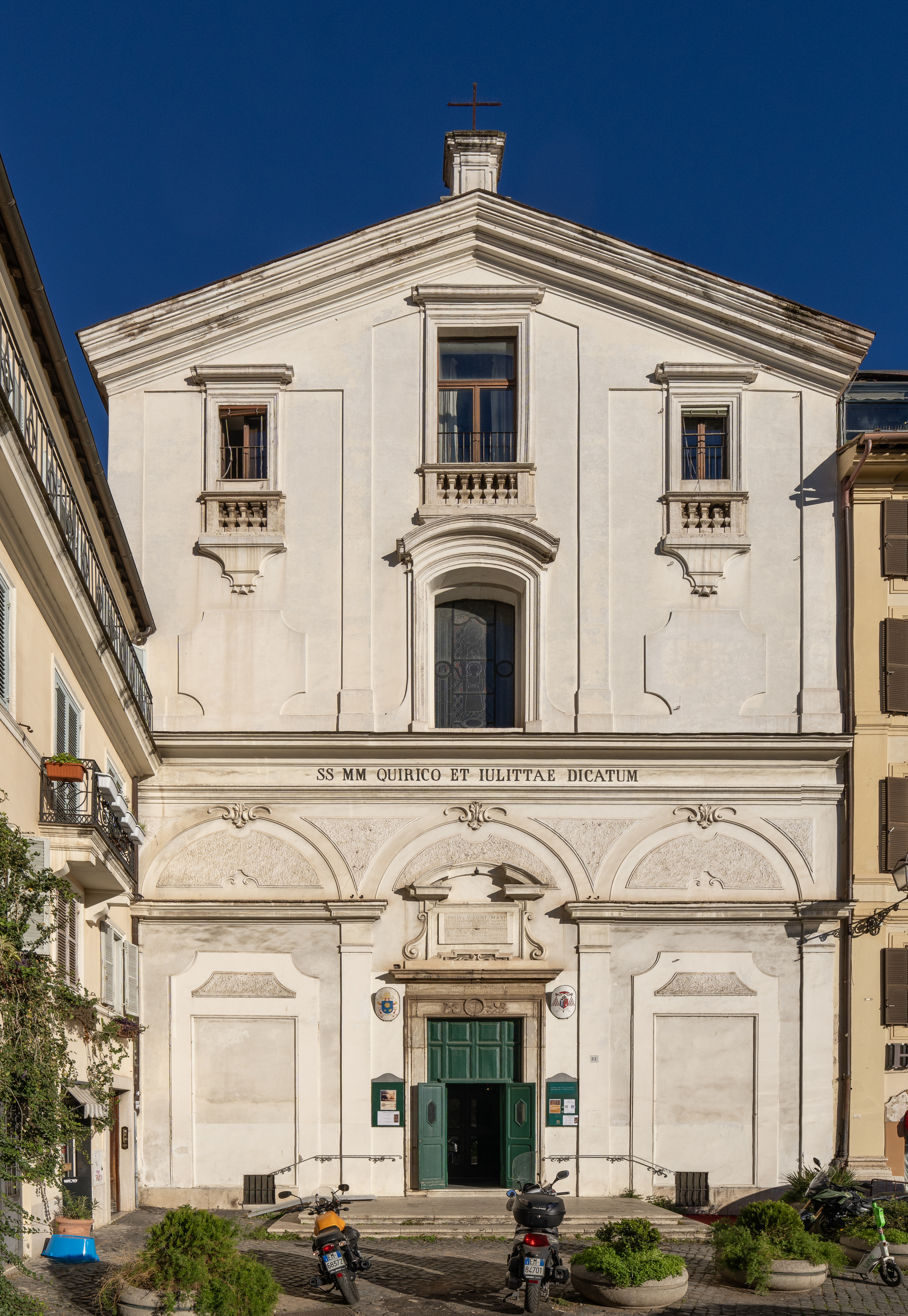
- Click on the map for a fullscreen view
- 41°53′38″N 12°29′15″E
- Location: Via Tor de' Conti, 31/A, Rome, Italy
- Denomination: Roman Catholic
- Churchmanship: Latin Rite

History
- Status: titular church
- Dedication: Saints Cyricus and Julitta

Architecture
- Architect: Filippo Raguzzini
- Architectural type: Church
- Style: Baroque
- Groundbreaking: 6th century
- Completed: 1733 (reconstruction)

Administration
- Diocese: Rome

The Roman Catholic titular church of Santi Quirico e Giulitta (Saints Quiricus and Julietta) in Rome is named after a son and mother who were martyred in 304 AD in Tarsus. The church is located in central Rome behind the Forum of Augustus. The address is Via di Tor de’ Conti 31/A, 00184.

Today the church is administered by the Third Order of Saint Francis. The feast of Sts Quiricus and Julitta is celebrated on 16 June.

== History ==
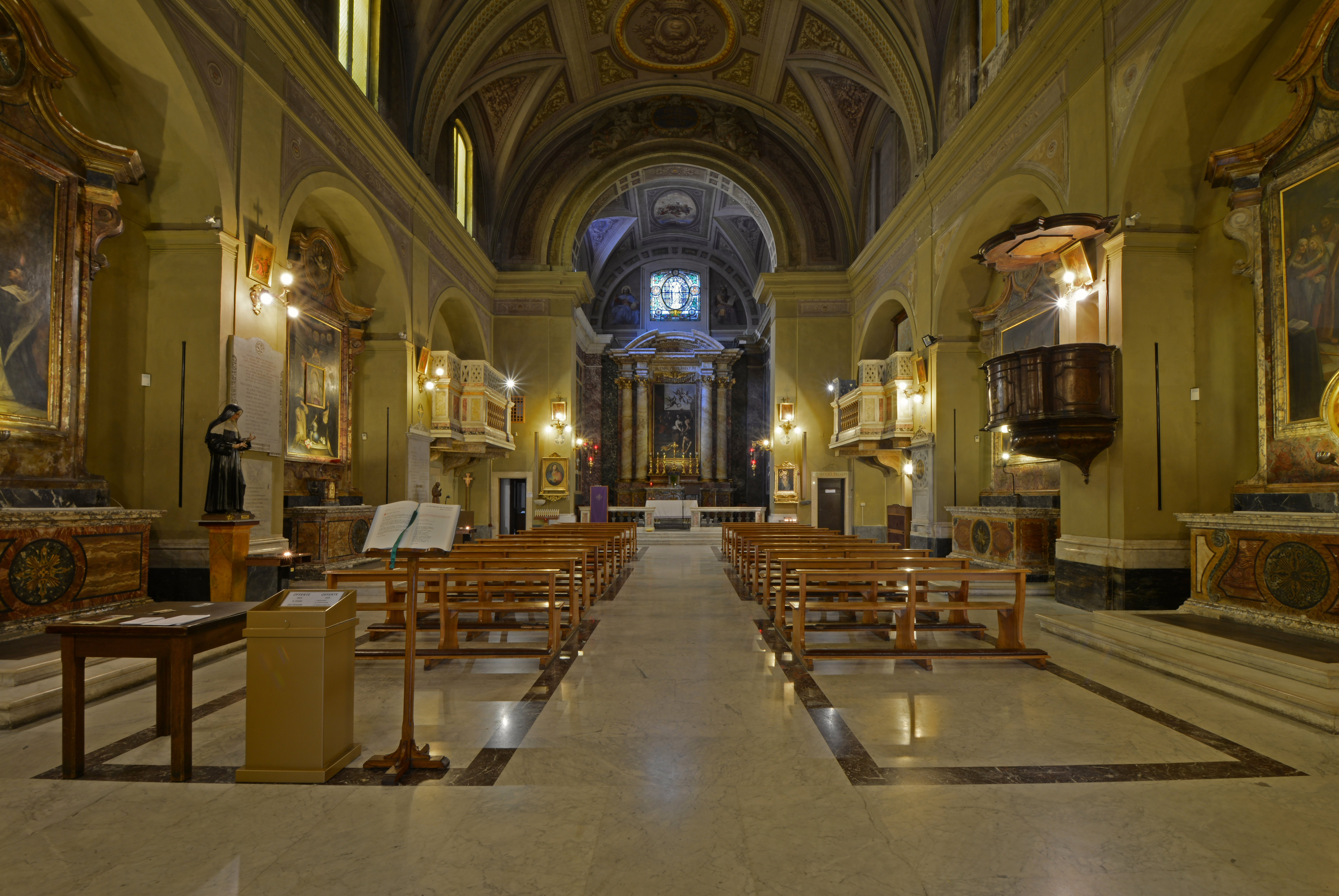
Interior of the church

The first church here was built in the 6th century, under Pope Vigilius, and originally dedicated to Sts Stephen and Lawrence the Deacons. It was rebuilt in the Gothic style in the 14th century.

The relics of St Cyriacus were translated here in 1475; they were later translated to the church of Santa Maria in Via Lata. The translation may have been the result of some confusion, as Cyriacus is an alternative form of Quiricus. In 1716, it was destroyed by fire. Pope Innocent XIII who was the Cardinal-Protector had it rebuilt and granted it to the Dominicans of San Marco. The church as it stands today was completed in 1733, and was designed by Filippo Raguzzini. In 1856, the vault was frescoed by Pietro Gagliardi.

The last restoration was carried out in 1965-1970.

The church has many connections to Ireland. The church was the first parish church of the original Irish College in Rome before the college moved to its present location. Some of the students of the Irish College who died in the seventeenth century and the eighteenth century are buried here. The church was established as a titular church on 13 April 1587, as a move away from the San Ciriaco alle Terme Diocleziane.

== List of titular cardinals ==
- Alessandro Ottaviano de' Medici (Pope Leo XI) (9 Jan 1584 – 14 Jan 1591)
- Francesco Maria Bourbon del Monte Santa Maria (5 April 1591 – 14 Feb 1592)
- Lucio Sassi (11 Oct 1593 – 29 Feb 1604)
- Marcello Lante della Rovere (9 Oct 1606 – 20 March 1628)
- Gregorio Naro (17 Dec 1629 - 7 Aug 1634 )
- Angelo Giori (1643–1662)
- Lorenzo Raggi (1664–1679)
- Galeazzo Marescotti (22 Sep 1681 - 21 Jun 1700)
- Vacant (1700–1710)
- Fulvio Astalli (19 Feb 1710 - 7 May 1710)
- Michelangelo Conti (Pope Innocent XIII) (7 Jun 1706 - 8 May 1721)
- Henri-Pons de Thiard de Bissy (16 Jun 1721 - 14 Aug 1730)
- Troiano Acquaviva d'Aragona (1732–1733)
- Domenico Riviera (or Rivera) (1733–1741)
- Luca Melchiore Tempi (1755–1756)
- Giuseppe Alessandro Furietti (1759–1764)
- Vacant (1764–1817)
- Antonio Lante (28 Jul 1816 - 23 Oct 1817)
- Vacant (1817–1829)
- Giovanni Antonio Benvenuti (15 Dec 1828 Appointed - 14 Nov 1838)
- Gabriele Ferretti (1839–1853)
- Juraj Haulík Váralyai (16 Jun 1856 Appointed - 11 May 1869 )
- Miguel Payá y Rico (12 Mar 1877 Appointed - 25 Dec 1891 )
- Giuseppe Maria Graniello, B. (12 Jun 1893 - 8 Jan 1896)
- Salvador Casañas y Pagés (29 Nov 1895 - 27 Oct 1908 )
- Vacant (1908–1916)
- Tommaso Pio Boggiani, O.P. (4 Dec 1916 - 15 Jul 1929)
- Vacant (1929–1958)
- Paul-Marie-André Richaud (15 Dec 1958 - 5 Feb 1968 )
- Vacant (1968–2007)
- Seán Baptist Brady (24 November 2007–present)
