= Giuseppe Maria Graniello =

Italian prelate

His Eminence Giuseppe Maria Graniello B.
- Cardinal-Priest of Santi Quirico e Giulitta
- Church: Roman Catholic Church
- Appointed: 15 June 1893
- Term ended: 8 January 1896
- Predecessor: Miguel Payá y Rico
- Successor: Salvador Casañas y Pagés
- Previous posts: Secretary of the Congregation for Bishops and Regulars (1892-93); Titular Archbishop of Cæsarea Ponti (1892-93)

Orders
- Ordination: 6 June 1857
- Consecration: 3 April 1892 by Raffaele Monaco La Valletta
- Created cardinal: 12 June 1893 by Pope Leo XIII
- Rank: Cardinal-Priest

Personal details
- Born: Giuseppe Maria Graniello; 8 February 1834 Naples, Kingdom of the Two Sicilies
- Died: 8 January 1896 (aged 61) Rome, Kingdom of Italy
- Buried: Campo Verano
- Parents: Luigi Granniello; Emanuela Madamigella

Giuseppe Maria Graniello, C.R.S.P., sometimes Granniello (8 February 1834 – 8 January 1896) was an Italian prelate of the Catholic Church who taught theology for two decades and led his order, the Barnabites, for twelve years, and then worked in the Roman Curia for several years. He became an archbishop in 1892 and a cardinal in 1893.

== Biography ==
Giuseppe Graniello was born in Naples on 8 February 1834. He joined the Congregation of Regular Clerics of St. Paul, known as the Barnabites. He was ordained a priest on 6 June 1857. He then worked for around 20 years as a professor of theology at his order's seminary based at in Rome at San Carlo ai Catinari. From 1877 to 1891 he was Procurator General of the order. He also served as a counselor to several dicasteries of the Roman Curia

In February 1887, at the pope's request, he prepared a report to guide a secret papal commission that was considering whether, in the event of European-wide war, the pope should leave Rome and what locations would prove an acceptable refuge.

On 8 January 1892, Granielo was named secretary in the Congregation for Bishops. On 29 March 1892, Pope Leo XIII appointed him titular archbishop of Caesarea Ponti. He received his episcopal consecration on 3 April 1892 from Cardinal Raffaele Monaco La Valletta.

On 12 June 1893, Pope Leo XIII made him a cardinal priest with the titular church Santi Quirico e Giulitta.

Granniello died in Rome on 8 January 1896 at the age of 61. He was interred in the Barnabite tomb Rome's Campo Verano cemetery.
