= Angelo Giori =

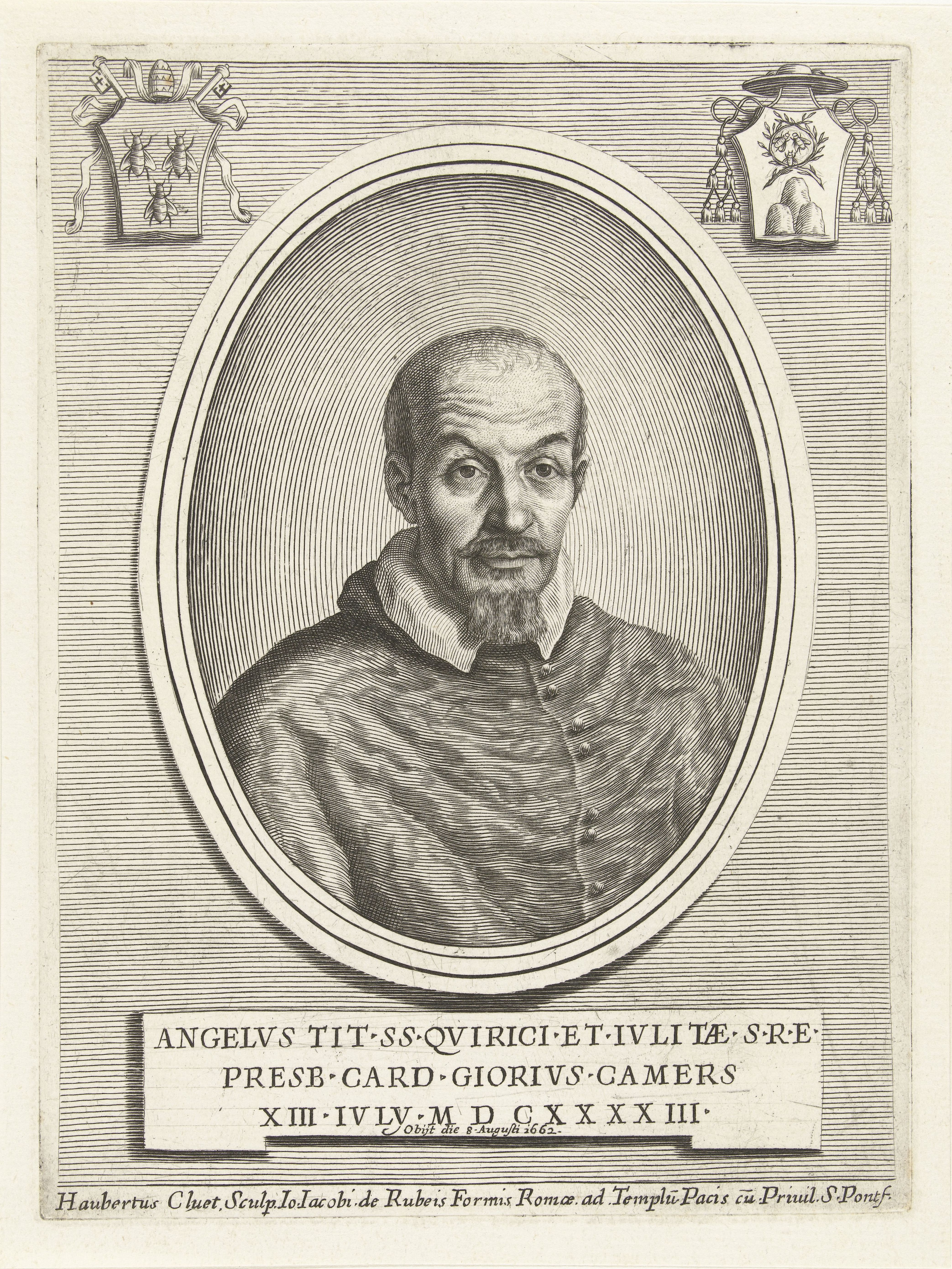
Niccolò Coscia

Angelo Giori (11 May 1586, Capodacqua - 8 August 1662, Rome) was an Italian Catholic Cardinal.

== Early life ==
Giori was born 11 May 1586 in Capodacqua, the son of Giovanni Francesco Giori and Polidora Polini. He began his studies at the Grammatica at Camerino and completed them at the Archgymnasium of Rome, where he studied literature, rhetoric, Greek, logic, physics and Latin and graduated in civil and criminal canon law.

Allying himself with his uncle Cesareo Giori, Angelo entered the service of cardinal Maffeo Barberini, later to become Pope Urban VIII, as his secretary. Giori acted as pedante to the Pope's nephews - Taddeo, Francesco and Antonio Barberini - while they were still of school age.

He continued in the service of the Barberini during the course of Pope Urban's reign and was a great fan of hunting - an activity the Barberini also undertook with enthusiasm.

== Cardinalate ==
Pope Urban elevated him to cardinal in the consistory of 13 July 1643 and on 31 August that year he received the purple and the titulus of Santi Quirico e Giulietta.

He took part in the 1644 and 1655 conclaves and built the Villa La Maddalena at Muccia. His portrait was painted by Andrea Sacchi (1599–1661).

On his death in 1662 he was buried at Camerino in the church of Santa Maria in via.

== Portraits and other links ==
- Portrait and lineage of Angelo Giori
- Portraits of Angelo Giori by Albert Clouet and Andrea Sacchi
- Portrait of Angelo Giori
- (in Italian) Fondo Del Drago (partially indexed), Archivio di Stato di Roma. The Fondo's online indexes - contains the archives of the Del Drago, Gentili, Giori and Sparapani families.
