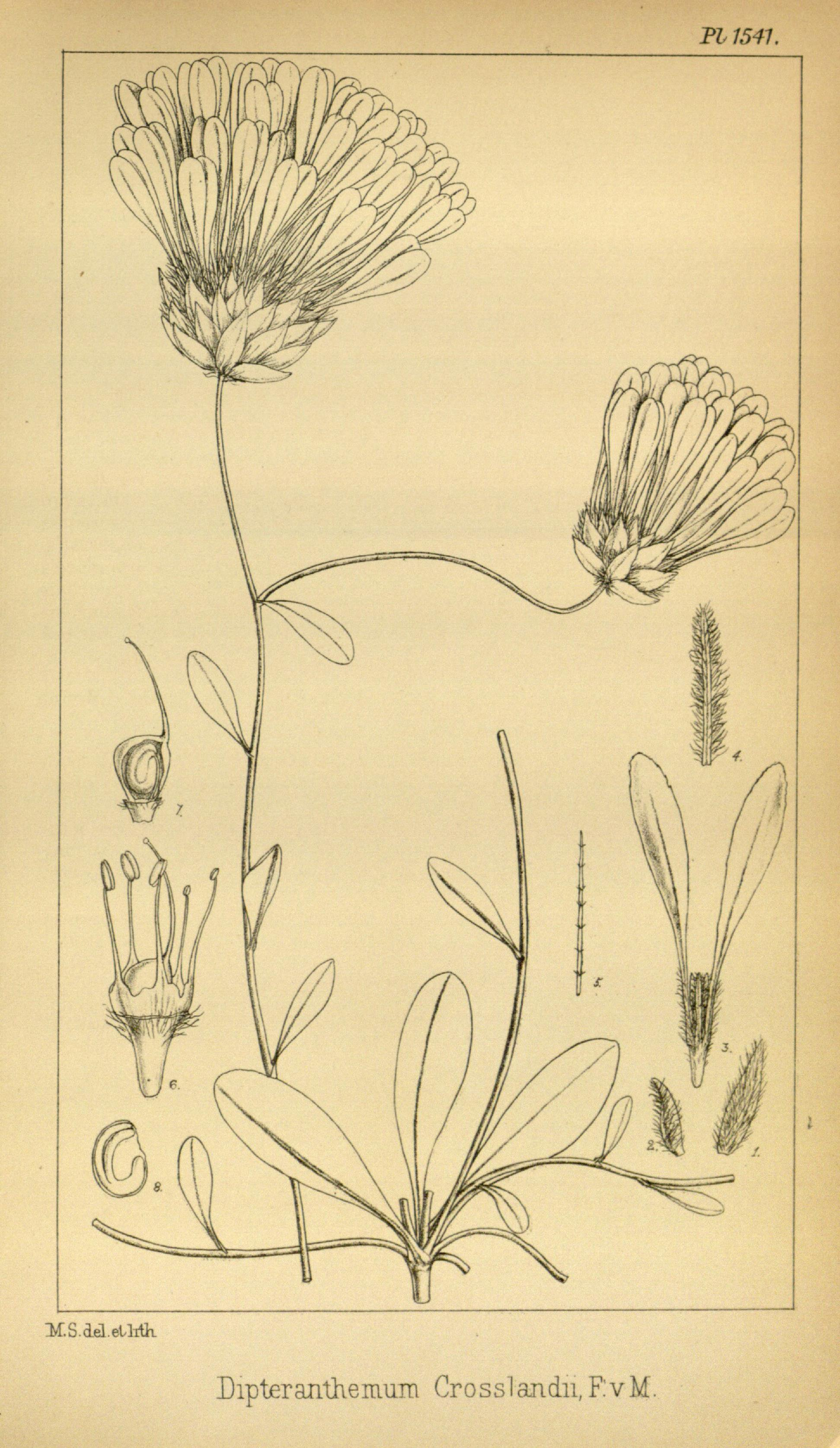
- Illustration of Ptilotus crosslandii

Conservation status
- Priority Three — Poorly Known Taxa (DEC)

Scientific classification
- Kingdom: Plantae
- Clade: Tracheophytes
- Clade: Angiosperms
- Clade: Eudicots
- Order: Caryophyllales
- Family: Amaranthaceae
- Genus: Ptilotus
- Species: P. crosslandii

Binomial name
- Ptilotus crosslandii (F.Muell.) Benl

Synonyms
- Dipteranthemum crosslandii F.Muell.; Diptheranthemum crosslandii F.Muell. orth. var.

= Ptilotus crosslandii =

Species of grass-like plant

Ptilotus crosslandii is a species of flowering plant in the family Amaranthaceae and is endemic to inland areas of northern Western Australia. It is a prostrate ephemeral or perennial herb, with lance-shaped to elliptic stem leaves, and broadly oval spikes of sometimes more than 50 to 100 flowers.

== Description ==
Ptilotus crosslandii is a prostrate, ephemeral or perennial herb with several brownish to purplish stems 10–70 cm (3.9–27.6 in) with side branches 1–15 cm (0.39–5.91 in) long. Up to 10 spoon-shaped, egg-shaped or wedge-shaped leaves 15–40 mm (0.59–1.57 in) long on a petiole up to 1.2 mm (0.047 in) long are crowded at the base of young plants. The stem leaves of adult plants are lance-shaped to elliptic, 10–15 mm (0.39–0.59 in) long and 2–7 mm (0.079–0.276 in) wide and eventually glabrous. The flower spikes are broadly oval, 35–45 mm (1.4–1.8 in) long and arranged singly at the ends of branches on a hairy rachis 15–20 mm (0.59–0.79 in) long, with about 50 to 100 opalescent flowers. The outer tepals are spoon-shaped, and linear in the lower half, 25–35 mm (0.98–1.38 in) long, the inner tepals linear 7.5–10.5 mm (0.30–0.41 in) long. There are three stamens and the ovary is club-shaped, 3.8–4.3 mm (0.15–0.17 in) long.

== Taxonomy ==
This species was first formally described in 1884 by Ferdinand von Mueller who gave it the name Dipteranthemum crosslandii in his Southern Science Record from specimens collected near the upper Murchison River by "C. Crossland, Esq.". In 1990, Gerhard Benl transferred the species to Ptilotus as P. crosslandii the journal Mitteilungen der Botanischen Staatssammlung Munchen. The specific epithet (crosslandii) honours Charles Crossland (1858–1911), a surveyor from Guildford, who collected the type specimen.

== Distribution and habitat ==
Ptilotus crosslandii grows in sandy soil on colluvial plains in the Carnarvon, Gascoyne and Murchison bioregions of northern Western Australia.

== Conservation status ==
This species of Ptilotus is listed as "Priority Three" by the Government of Western Australia Department of Biodiversity, Conservation and Attractions, meaning that it is poorly known and known from only a few locations but is not under imminent threat.

== See also ==
- List of Ptilotus species
