= Francesco Maria De Regi =

Italian mathematician

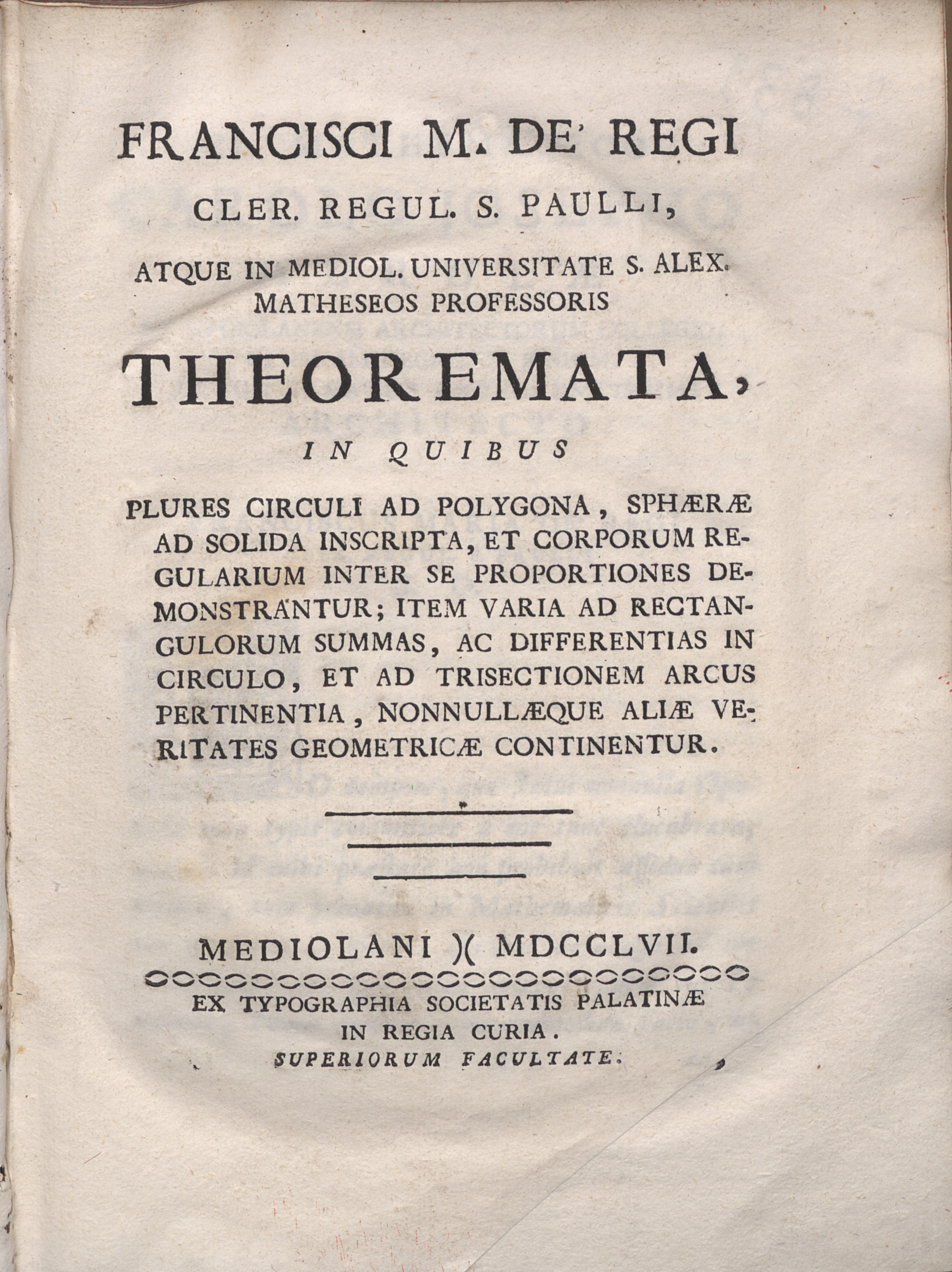
Theoremata, title page (1757)

Francesco Maria De Regi (Milan, 1720 – 1794) was an Italian mathematician.

He was a Barnabite priest. He worked particularly on hydraulic engineering. At twenty-four he took the chair of mathematics, specially created for him, in the school of the Collegio of Sant'Alessandro in Milan.

== Works ==
- Theoremata (in Latin). Milan: Società Palatina. 1757.
- Uso della tavola parabolica nella misura delle acque correnti destinate all'innaffiamento delle terre (in Italian). Milan: Giuseppe Richino Malatesta. 1764.
