= Giovanni Bellarini =

Roman Catholic theologian

Giovanni (John) Bellarini (1552 – 1630) was an Italian Roman Catholic theologian who wrote influential commentaries on the Council of Trent. He was a Barnabite.

== Life ==
He was born at Castelnuovo, Italy, in 1552, and was Visitor and twice Assistant General of his order. He taught theology at Padua and Rome, and was esteemed particularly by Pope Gregory XV. He died at Milan, 27 August 1630.

== Works ==
Best known as a moral theologian, he left a number of theological treatises, including a commentary on the Council of Trent and the Roman Catechism, in two parts, forming two distinct volumes. The first, for the instruction of the faithful, is entitled "Doctrina d. Concilii Tridentini et Cathechismi Romani de Symbolo Apostolorum" (Brescia, 1603). The parts of this work relating to the decalogue have been published in French. The second work, designed for the conversion of heretics, and entitled "Doctrina Catholica ex Sacro Concilio Tridentino et Catechismo Romano" (Milan, 1620), passed through several editions.

Bellarini composed a number of booklets in Italian for confessors and penitents, and a treatise on the doctrine of Thomas Aquinas on physical predetermination and on the determination in general of all things and causes into active operation (Milan, 1606). He is also the author of a work on method (Milan, 1606), which was republished under a slightly different title, along with his "Mirror of Divine and Human Wisdom" (Milan, 1630).
