= Ermenegildo Pini =

Italian naturalist, geologist and philosopher

Ermenegildo Pini CRSP
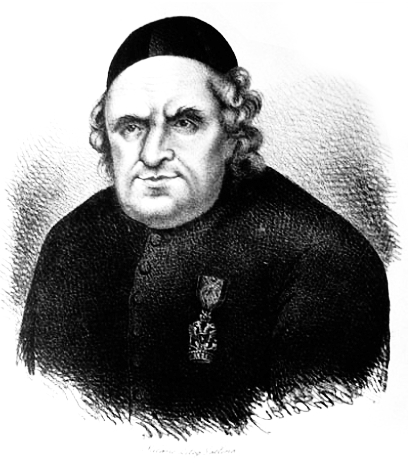
- Portrait of Ermenegildo Pini
- Born: Carlo Pini; 17 June 1739; Milan, Duchy of Milan
- Died: 3 January 1825 (aged 85); Milan, Duchy of Milan
- Parent(s): Domenico Pini and Maddalena Pini (née Venini)
- Scientific career
- Fields: Natural history; Geology; Philosophy

Ecclesiastical career
- Religion: Christianity
- Church: Catholic Church
- Ordained: 18 December 1762

Ermenegildo Pini CRSP (17 June 1739 – 3 January 1825) was an Italian clergyman, naturalist, mathematician, geologist and philosopher. He belonged to the Barnabite Order and worked mainly in northern Italy. He attempted to examine scientific ideas on geological phenomena and fossils and show them as being consistent with the framework of Biblical Genesis.

== Biography ==
Pini was born in Milan and went to study in the Barnabite schools at Monza and Milan. He studied philosophy and geometry and received a degree in theology in 1760 from Rome. He taught canon law and mathematics at the college of Sant'Alessandro in Zebedia. In 1773 he was appointed head of the newly created Museum of Sant’Alessandro. During the subsequent years, he collected specimens of geology and made studies on the rocks of Europe. He recognized the nature of igneous, sedimentary and metamorphic rocks and discussed ideas on the origin of the mountains in the region, measuring the heights of their peaks. Pini also translated Nathanael Gottfried Leske's German work Anfangsgründe der Naturgeschichte into Italian. He noticed mollusc shells in strata found high in the mountains and questioned attempts by Neptunists to explain it on the basis of a primeval sea that reached to the tops of the peaks. He suggested that the difference in sea heights may have been produced by brief changes in the rate of rotation of the earth so as to make the forty-day Biblical flood plausible.

Pini described a variety of orthoclase called Adularia from the Adula Alps near Gotthard in 1780.

== Writings ==
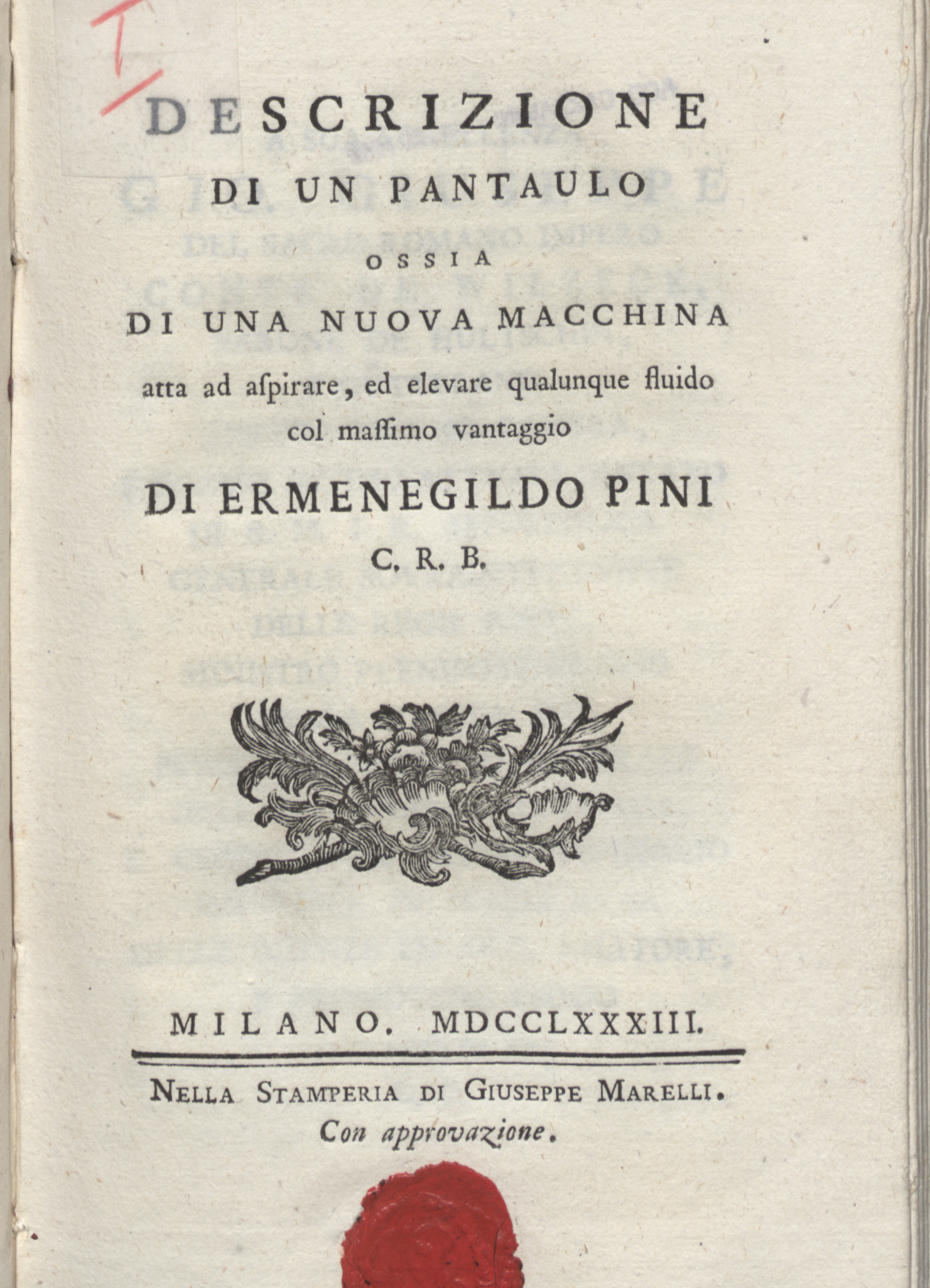
Descrizione di un pantaulo (1783)

Pini's writings included:

- (1781) Osservazioni mineralogiche sulla montagna di S. Gottardo. In:Opuscoli scelti sulle scienze e sulle arti 4.
- (1783) Memoria mineralogica sulla montagna e sui contorni di S. Gottardo. Milano, Marelli.
- Descrizione di un pantaulo ossia di una nuova macchina atta ad aspirare, ed elevare qualunque fluido col massimo vantaggio di Ermenegildo Pini C.R.B. Milano: nella Stamperia di Giuseppe Marelli. 1783.
- (1784) Mineralogische Beobachtungen über den St. Gothard. German translation by Adolf Beyer, Schneeberg of the 1781 work.
- (1784) Ueber den S. Gotthardsberg und seine umliegenden Gegenden. German translation published in Vienna of the 1783 work.
- (1785) Supplemento alle osservazioni sulla montagna di S. Gottardo. In: Opuscoli scelti sulle scienze e sulle arti 7, 124–128. Supplement to the 1783 work.
- (1786) Osservazioni sui feldspati ed altri fossili singolari dell'Italia. In: Memorie di matematica e fisica della Società italiana, 3, 688–717.
- (1790) Di alcuni fossili singolari della Lombardia Austriaca e di altre parti d'Italia. Milano, Marelli.
