= Vincenzo Sangermano =

18th and 19th-century Italian Catholic priest and missionary

The Rev. Father Vincenzo Sangermano, C.R.S.P.

Personal details
- Born: 22 April 1758 Arpino, Papal States
- Died: 28 July 1819 (aged 61) Livorno, Grand Duchy of Tuscany
- Denomination: Roman Catholic

Vincenzo Sangermano, C.R.S.P., (22 April 1758 – 28 July 1819) was an Italian Roman Catholic priest and missionary of the Barnabite Order, who traveled to South-East Asia in the late 1700s and worked in Burma from 1783 to 1806. He served in the former Ava Kingdom and Bago, Burma. After his return to Italy, he was placed in charge of the house of his Order, in Arpino. He planned to return to Burma, but died before he could set sail. He is the author of A Description of the Burmese Empire, translated into English and posthumously published in 1833, which proved a valuable source of information for the later study of Burma and its people.

== Biography ==
Sangermano was sent out in 1782 to aid in the mission in what is now Burma; the order had been assigned Ava and Pegu in Burma, a mission they maintained until 1832. Arriving in Rangoon in July 1783, he went on to reside in Ava. He soon returned to Rangoon where he spent the rest of his career in Burma, and where he also ministered to the descendants of Portuguese colonists, who had been deported to a remote region after the Portuguese rulers in Thanlyin had been defeated in the early seventeenth century; apparently Sangermano found two thousand of them still maintaining their religion. By all accounts he was successful in his mission, and counted the wife of the Viceroy of Pegu among those who attended his church (though she never converted). He also documented what he saw among the peoples he visited, including for instance the Karen, and his notes are some of the earliest Western witnesses to the Burmese people. He learned the Burmese language, studied the literature, and was held "in high estimation by the natives for his exemplary life and inoffensive manners." Sangermano was a skilled draughtsman, and received a lifelong pension from the British East India Company for having drawn a very accurate map of the port of Rangoon.

Sangermano returned to Italy in 1808, and while he had wished to return to his mission, the Napoleonic invasion and the ensuing war prevented him from doing so. He became president of the Barnabite order in Arpino, all the while preparing a manuscript outlining his experiences in Burma, but his death in 1819 preventing him from seeing the publication of the book. He died in Arpino on 28 July, preparing to sail for Burma again.

== Description of the Burmese Empire ==
Sangermao's manuscript was first published in 1833 as A Description of the Burmese Empire, with the help of the Royal Asiatic Society of Great Britain and Ireland and Cardinal Wiseman, who wrote the introduction to the book. It was reprinted in 1884 with a preface and additional notes by John Jardine, under the title The Burmese empire a hundred years ago, and again by Jardine, with an added introduction, in 1893, under the same title—an edition criticized (in the Journal of the Royal Asiatic Society) for its spelling and lack of notes . The book contains chapters on cosmography, religion, history, and the like, and an abstract of the Burmese Dhammasattha, the 'golden rule'.

The English 1833 translation proved an important document for the later study of Burma and provided important demographic and other information, though some of its content proved erroneous or exaggerated, or otherwise in need of modification. For instance, he assessed the size of the population of the kingdom of Burma, as he called it, at 2 million, but this refers only to the area called Upper Burma. Sangermano also describes the practice of "heating" women just after childbirth, by placing them naked close to a fire until they were "quite scorched and blackened." While heating methods did play a part in postnatal care, "Sangermano's account appears highly sensationalised." His descriptions of a disease he calls "mordazinno," a Portuguese word, seems to indicate the presence of cholera in Burma before 1817. His description of the Burmese people (as inherently lazy) was severely criticized in 1882 by James George Scott in The Burman: his life and notions.
