= Josep Caixal i Estradé =

19th century bishop and co-prince of Andorra

His Excellency Josep Caixal i Estradè
- Bishop of Urgell, Co-Prince of Andorra
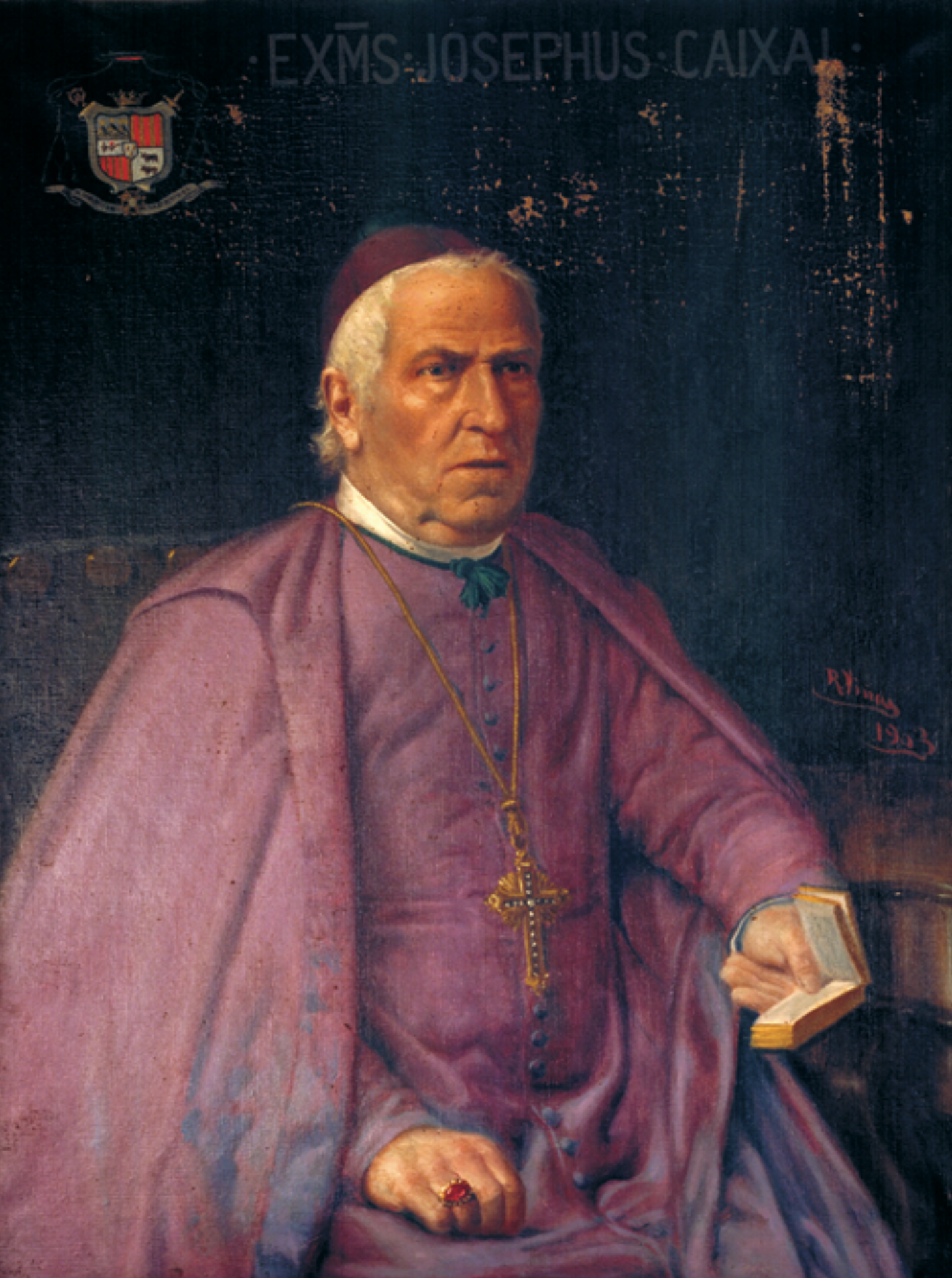
- Church: Roman Catholic Church
- See: La Seu d'Urgell
- In office: 1853 - 1879
- Predecessor: Simó de Guardiola y Hortoneda
- Successor: Salvador Casañas y Pagés

Personal details
- Born: 9 July 1803 El Vilosell, Lleida, Spain
- Died: 26 August 1879 (aged 76) Rome, Italy
- Denomination: Catholic

Josep Caixal i Estradé (1803–1879) was Bishop of Urgell from 1853 until his death in Rome in 1879 and co-prince of Andorra during the New Reform period.

He studied at Tarragona, where he taught the Holy Scriptures, and obtained a canonry (1831). He was professor of philosophy at the University of Cervera. During the First Carlist War, he was exiled to Montauban-de-Luchon.

On 30 November 1851 he was named as the successor of Simó de Guardiola as bishop of Urgell. In 1853 he became the bishop of Urgell and therefore co-prince of Andorra. In that time he was considered a very conservative catholic. In 1855 he had to defend himself against a charge of conspiracy made by the governor of Catalonia. In 1867 he protested in Madrid against the confiscation of goods of the Church and the abusive use of it by the Spanish government.

He attended the First Vatican Council during 1869-1870 (Vaticanum I), where he participated in the drafting of the structure of faith, and in discussions on the infallibility of the Pope, and the composition of the Church, as well as other issues of disciplinary nature.

Ideologically a Carlist, driven by a strong and energetic spirit, he clashed seriously with the liberal authorities. During the reign of Amadeo I, he represented the ecclesiastical province of Tarragona (1870-1872) in the Senate and became well known for his defense of Catholic unity in Spain.

Once the Republic was proclaimed (1873), he moved to Andorra, and from there to Navarre, in order to serve in the field as vicar general to the Carlists who had taken arms. When they later occupied the Seu d'Urgell (1874), the Bishop Caixal returned to the city to join in its defence until his imprisonment in Alacant (1875), under the victorious occupiers led by Martínez de Campos.

He afterwards travelled to Rome, but thereafter the Spanish government denied him permission to return to Spain. Pope Pius IX made him assistant to the pontifical throne and Roman count. He died in Rome and was buried at the Seu d'Urgell.

== Involvement with Teresa Toda and Teresa Guasch ==
Caixal's spiritual and pastoral influence had a significant impact on the lives and vocations of the venerables Teresa Toda i Juncosa and her daughter Teresa Guasch i Toda, founders of the Carmelite Sisters of Saint Joseph.

While he was a canon in Tarragona, he became the spiritual director of Teresa Toda, who, after legally separating from her husband due to abuse and abandonment, decided to consecrate her life to God. With Caixal’s counsel, she developed the idea of founding a congregation dedicated to caring for orphaned and poor girls.

In 1863, Teresa Toda shared the project with her daughter Teresa Guasch, and under Caixal’s guidance, they began discreetly preparing the future congregation. In 1868, now bishop of Urgell, he encouraged them to settle in Barcelona and, finally, in 1874 urged them to formally begin the religious institute.

Thanks to Caixal’s episcopal support, the first religious community was established on 22 February 1878. The constitutions were approved in 1883, the same year in which mother and daughter professed as religious. Caixal’s spiritual guidance and discernment were instrumental in the foundation of the congregation, which now has a presence in Europe, the Americas, and Africa.
