= Adularescence =

Milky luster or iridescence originating from below the surface of gemstones

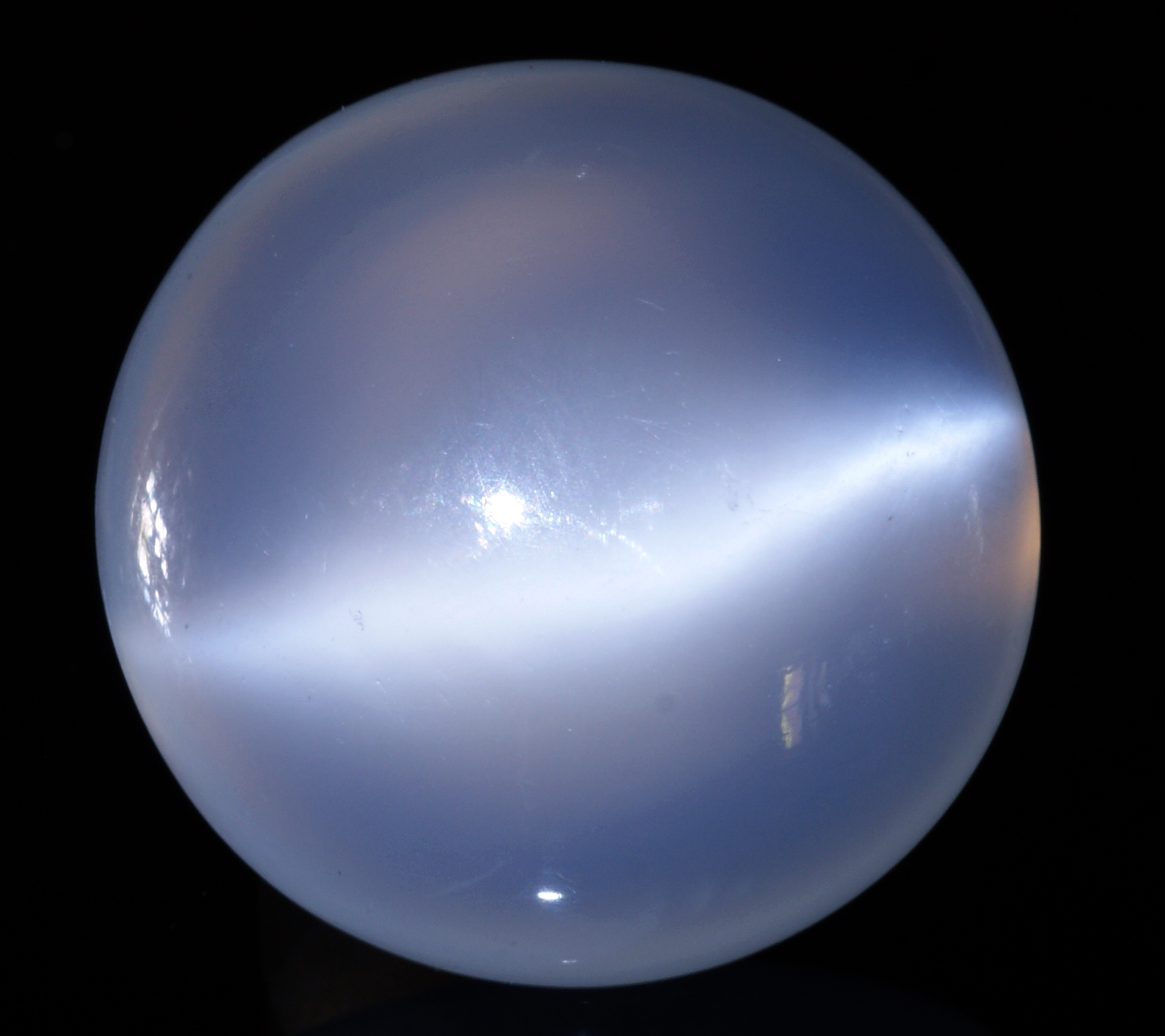
Adularescence in a moonstone cabochon, Minas Gerais, Brazil. The specimen's diameter is 23 mm (0.91 in).

Adularescence (/ˌædʒələˈrɛsəns/ AJ-ə-lə-RES-əns) is an optical phenomenon that is produced in gemstones like moonstone. The optical effect is similar to labradorescence and aventurescence.

== Description ==
The effect of adularescence, also commonly referred to as schiller or shiller, is best described as a milky, bluish luster or glow originating from below the surface of the gemstone. The schiller, appearing to move as the stone is turned (or as the light source is moved), gives the impression of lunar light floating on water (accounting for moonstone's name). Though white schiller is the most common, in rarer specimens, orange or blue lusters are produced.

This effect is most typically produced by adularia, a K-feldspar or orthoclase (KAlSi_{3}O_{8}), from which the name is derived. Adularescence appears in other gemstones, notably common opal, rose quartz and agate. However, due to inclusions in these other stones, the effect is displayed differently. The schiller is scattered by inclusions and appears hazy; non-hazy specimens are specially referred to as "milky". Thus, adularescence occurring in non-adularia gemstones is termed differently – the "girasol effect" and opalescence (for opals only) are two such terms. When the schiller forms an indistinct band, it is said to display a chatoyant effect. Only clearly defined bands are referred to as "cat's eyes".

As an optical phenomenon, adularescence exists only in the presence of light; it is a product of the interaction between light and the internal microstructures of the mineral and not a property of the mineral itself. The effect is produced by alternating layers of two types at a scale near the wavelength of light (approximately 0.5 micron) – this leads to light scattering and interference.

== See also ==
- Rainbow lattice sunstone
