= Orthoclase =

Feldspar mineral found in igneous rock

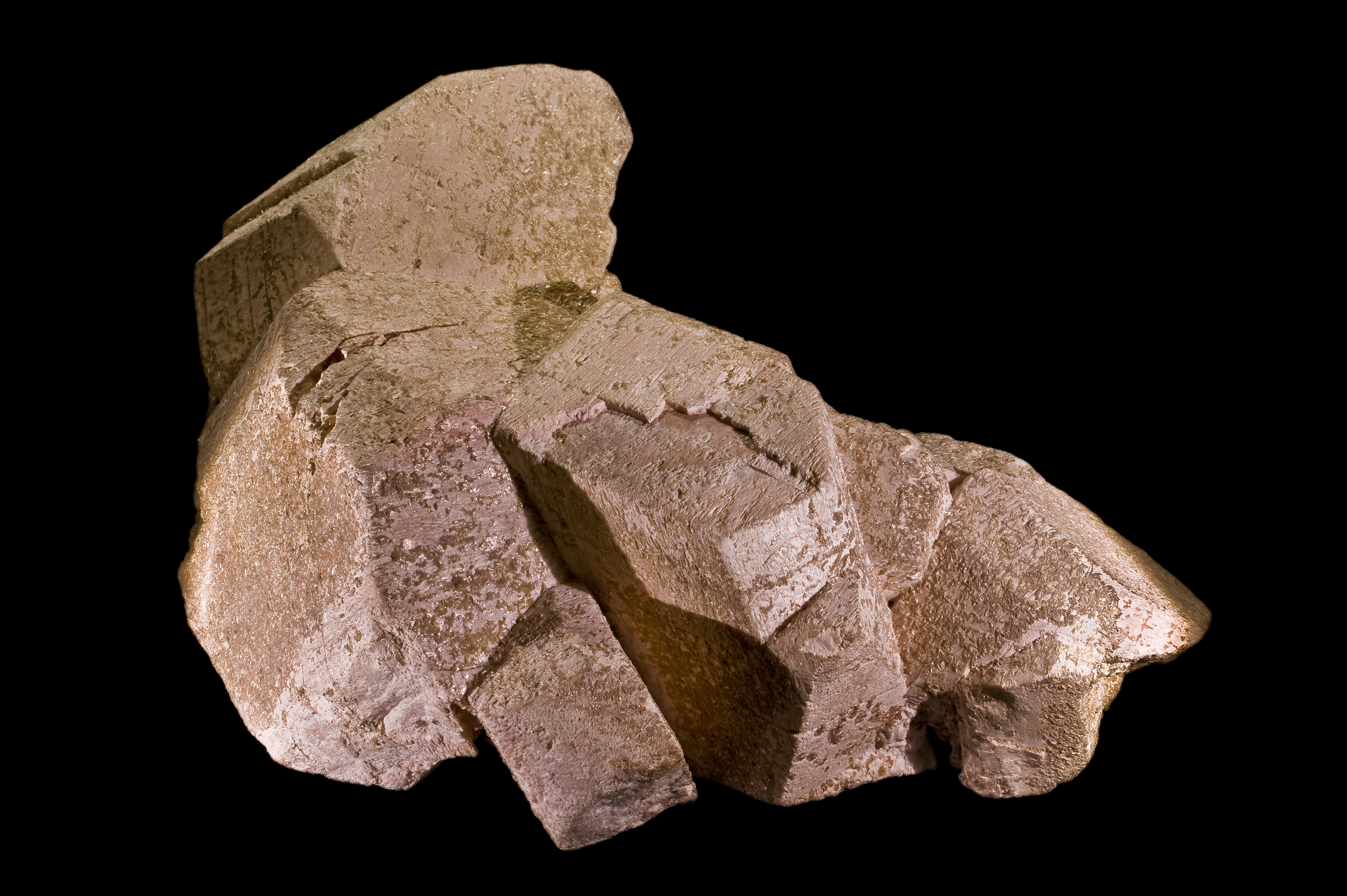

General
- Category: Tectosilicate minerals
- Group: Feldspar group
- Series: Alkali feldspar series
- Formula: KAlSi_{3}O_{8}
- IMA symbol: Or
- IMA status: Grandfathered (1801)
- Strunz classification: 9.FA.30
- Dana classification: 76.1.1.1
- Crystal system: Monoclinic
- Crystal class: Prismatic (2/m)
- Space group: C2/m (no. 12)

Identification
- Color: Colorless, greenish, greyish yellow, white, pink
- Crystal habit: Can be anhedral or euhedral. Grains are commonly elongate with a tabular appearance.
- Twinning: Typically displays Carlsbad twinning. Baveno and Manebach twins have also been reported in orthoclase.
- Cleavage: Has perfect cleavage on {001} and good cleavage on {010}. Cleavages intersect at 90°. It can be difficult to see cleavage in thin section due to orthoclase's low relief.
- Fracture: Uneven
- Mohs scale hardness: 6 (defining mineral)
- Luster: Vitreous, pearly on cleavage surfaces
- Streak: White
- Diaphaneity: Transparent to translucent
- Specific gravity: 2.55–2.63
- Optical properties: Biaxial (−), 2V = 65–75
- Refractive index: n_{α} = 1.518–1.520 n_{β} = 1.522–1.524 n_{γ} = 1.522–1.525
- Birefringence: 0.0050–0.0060
- Dispersion: Relatively strong
- Extinction: Parallel to cleavage
- Length fast/slow: No slow or fast length
- Diagnostic features: Distinguishable from microcline by a lack in gridiron twinning. Distinguishable from sanidine by a larger 2V_{x}.
- Other characteristics: Low negative relief; alters to sericite or clay (commonly)

Orthoclase, or orthoclase feldspar (endmember formula KAlSi_{3}O_{8}), is an important tectosilicate mineral which forms igneous rock. The name is from the Ancient Greek for "straight fracture", because its two cleavage planes are at right angles to each other. It is a type of alkali feldspar, also known as potassium feldspar or K-spar. The gem known as moonstone (see below) is largely composed of orthoclase.

== Formation and subtypes ==
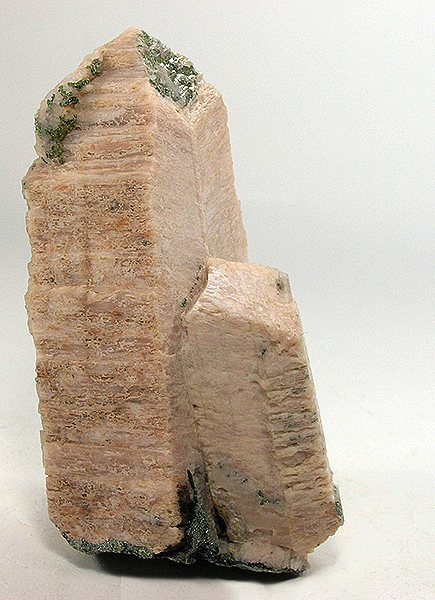
Orthoclase crystal twinning from the Organ Mountains in New Mexico

Orthoclase is a common constituent of most granites and other felsic igneous rocks and often forms huge crystals and masses in pegmatite.

Typically, the pure potassium endmember of orthoclase forms a solid solution with albite, the sodium endmember (NaAlSi_{3}O_{8}) of plagioclase. While slowly cooling within the earth, sodium-rich albite lamellae form by exsolution, enriching the remaining orthoclase with potassium. The resulting intergrowth of the two feldspars is called perthite.

The higher-temperature polymorph of KAlSi_{3}O_{8} is sanidine. Sanidine is common in rapidly cooled volcanic rocks such as obsidian and felsic pyroclastic rocks, and is notably found in trachytes of the Drachenfels, Germany. The lower-temperature polymorph of KAlSi_{3}O_{8} is microcline.

Adularia is a low temperature form of either microcline or orthoclase originally reported from the low temperature hydrothermal deposits in the Adula Alps of Switzerland. It was first described by Ermenegildo Pini in 1781. The optical effect of adularescence in moonstone is typically due to adularia.

The largest documented single crystal of orthoclase was found in the Ural Mountains in Russia. It measured around 10 m × 10 m × 0.4 m (33 ft × 33 ft × 1 ft) and weighed around 100 tonnes (110 short tons).

== Applications ==
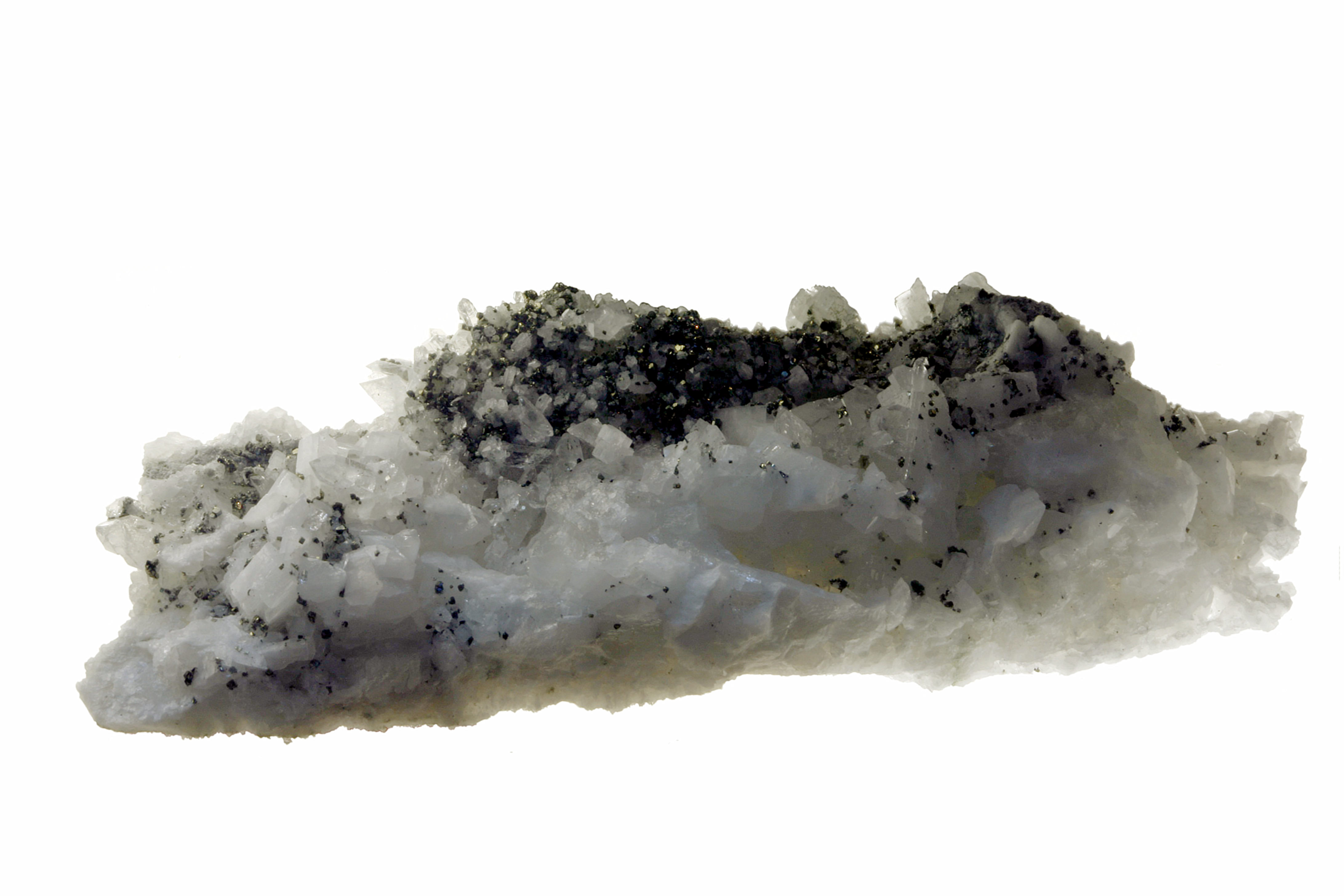
Adularia (KAlSi_{3}O_{8}) with pyrite (FeS_{2}) incrustations

Together with the other potassium feldspars, orthoclase is a common raw material for the manufacture of some glasses and some ceramics such as porcelain, and as a constituent of scouring powder.

Some intergrowths of orthoclase and albite have an attractive pale luster and are called moonstone when used in jewelry. Most moonstones are translucent and white, although grey and peach-colored varieties also occur. In gemology, their luster is called adularescence and is typically described as creamy or silvery white with a "billowy" quality. It is the state gem of Florida.

The gemstone commonly called rainbow moonstone is more properly a colorless form of labradorite and can be distinguished from "true" moonstone by its greater transparency and play of color, although their value and durability do not greatly differ.

Orthoclase is one of the ten defining minerals of the Mohs scale of mineral hardness, on which it is listed as having a hardness of 6.

NASA's Curiosity rover discovery of high levels of orthoclase in Martian sandstones suggested that some Martian rocks may have experienced complex geological processing, such as repeated melting.

== See also ==
- List of minerals
- Schiller, optical effect
