= Charles Schilling =

Norwegian priest and painter (1835–1907)

Venerable Karl Maria Schilling C.R.S.P.
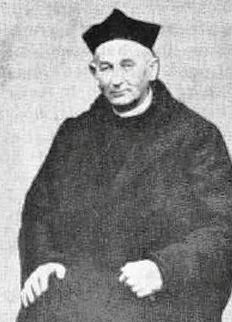

Priest
- Born: Karl Halfdan Schilling; 9 June 1835; Christiania, (now Oslo), Norway
- Died: 2 January 1907 (aged 71); Mouscron, Hainaut Belgium
- Venerated in: Catholic Church

Karl Halfdan Schilling, CRSP (9 June 1835 – 2 January 1907) was a Norwegian Barnabite cleric who is venerated in the Catholic Church.

== Biography ==
Schilling was born in Christiania, Norway. He was an atheist (nominally Lutheran) convert to Catholicism, which he first came into contact with when he was nineteen years old and studying art in Düsseldorf. He was received into the Catholic Church on 11 November 1854.

Gradually, as he spent more and more of his time in prayer and charity work, he gave up his painting. He was ordained a priest at Bourges, France, on 18 December 1875.

Schilling became a spiritual director in the Barnabite Order (Clerics Regular of St Paul). He worked mainly in France, Italy and Belgium. His last years were spent in Mouscron, Belgium, where his evident holiness led people to call him "the tall saint" (because of his height) or "the saint of Mouscron".

== Veneration ==
Shortly after Schilling's death people began to flock to his grave, and on 24 March 1936 his body was moved to the Barnabite Church, where it was placed in a side chapel. His grave is still frequently visited by pilgrims.

He is the only post-Reformation Norwegian cleric to be officially considered for sainthood by the Catholic Church. His spiritual writings were approved by theologians on 19 May 1939, and his cause was officially opened on 22 November 1946, granting him the title of Servant of God. He has since been declared Venerable.

== Books ==
- Undset, Sigrid, A Priest From Norway - The Venerable Karl Schilling, translated by the Barnabite Fathers.
