= Giovanni Antonio Baranzano =

Italian priest, astronomer and writer (1590–1622)

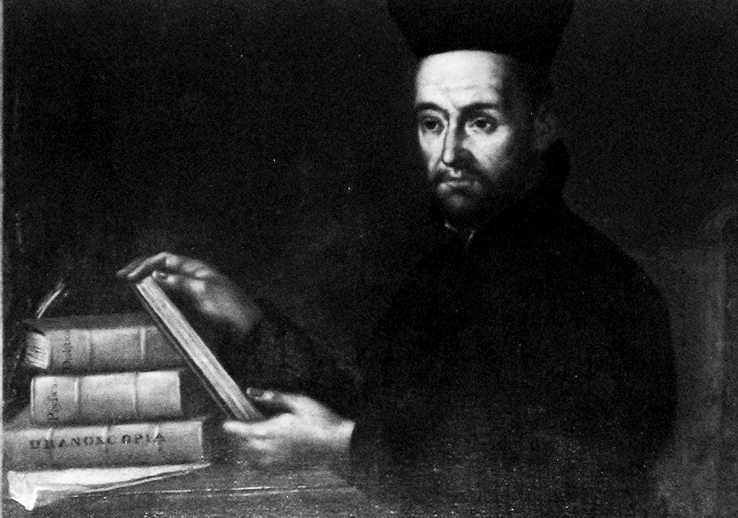

Padre Redento Baranzano born Giovanni Antonio Baranzano (4 February 1590 – 23 December 1622) was an Italian Barnabite priest, astronomer and writer who wrote a pamphlet Uranoscopia (1617) which supported a Copernican sun-centric planetary system. He was forced by the church to retract his publication.

== Life and work ==
Baranzano was born in Serravalle Sesia to Pietro and Clara.

He studied at Crevalcuore, Vercelli, Novara and Milan. His education at Monz was in religion, philosophy, Latin, Greek, Hebrew, and Chaldaic. He became a Barnabite on 11 March 1609 and took the name Redento. In 1615, he was posted by Giovanni Magenta to teach at Collège Chappuisien in Annecy. His primary activity was preaching against the Calvinists but he also began to examine scientific ideas. He corresponded with Francis Bacon, who told Baranzano, before anybody else, about his Novum Organum. He was also known to Galileo Galilei.

Baranzano published a note on physics Novae opiniones physicae (1619) but he is best known because of his tract on astronomy begun in 1617 which accepted a heliocentric view and opposed Aristotle's ideas. This book Uranoscopia seu De coelo was published in 1619 by Jean Pillehotte in Lyon.

He was called to Milan by the Archbishop and asked to make corrections to his writings. He wrote a tract to retract his ideas in Nova de motu terrae Copernican iuxta Summi Pontificis mentem disputatio (1618). He continued to be critical of the servile repetition of Aristotle's ideas.

After 1620, he went to teach at Montargis alongside Father Tobia Corona where he died two years later.
