= Salvador Casañas y Pagés =

Spanish Roman Catholic bishop and Co-Prince of Andorra

His Eminence Salvador Casañas y Pagés
- Bishop of Barcelona
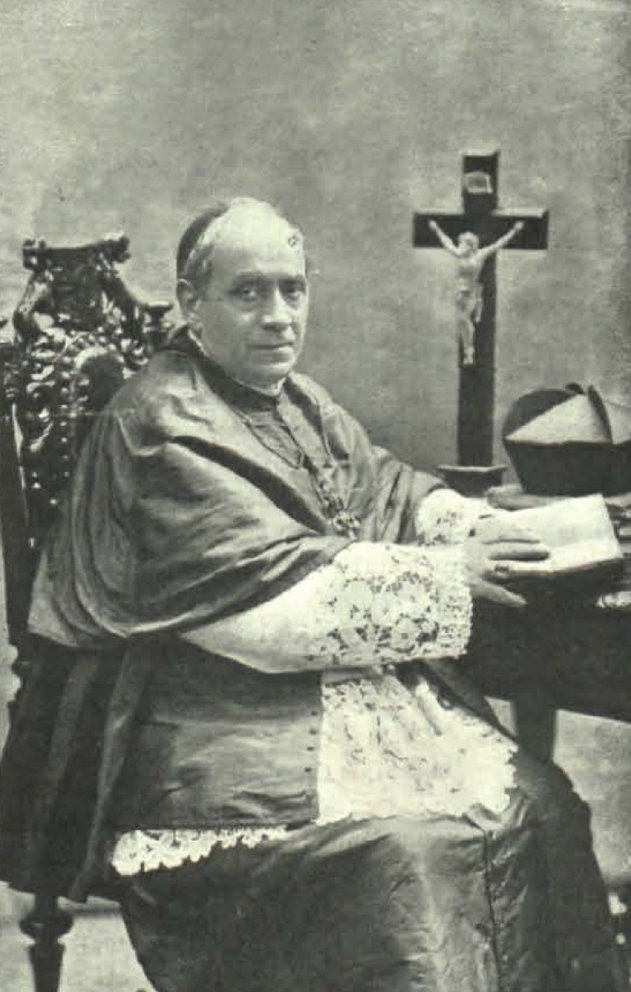
- Church: Roman Catholic Church
- Diocese: Barcelona
- See: Barcelona
- Appointed: 18 April 1901
- Term ended: 27 October 1908
- Predecessor: José Morgades y Gili
- Successor: Juan José Laguarda y Fenollera
- Other post: Cardinal-Priest of Santi Quirico e Giulitta (1896-1908)
- Previous posts: Titular Bishop of Ceramus (1879); Bishop of Urgell (1879-1901)

Orders
- Ordination: 18 December 1858
- Consecration: 23 March 1879 by José Maria de Urquinaona y Vidot
- Created cardinal: 29 November 1895 by Pope Leo XIII
- Rank: Cardinal-Priest

Personal details
- Born: Salvador Casañas y Pagés; 5 September 1834 Barcelona, Spanish Kingdom
- Died: 27 October 1908 (aged 74) Barcelona, Kingdom of Spain
- Buried: Barcelona Cathedral

Styles of Salvador Casañas y Pagés
- Reference style: His Eminence
- Spoken style: Your Eminence
- Informal style: Cardinal
- See: none

Salvador Casañas y Pagés (5 September 1834 – 27 October 1908) was a Spanish cardinal of the Roman Catholic Church. He served as Bishop of Barcelona from 1901 until his death, and was elevated to the cardinalate in 1895.

== Biography ==
Salvador Casañas y Pagés was born in Barcelona, and studied at the seminary in Barcelona and the University of Valencia, from where he obtained his licentiate in theology in 1857. He was ordained to the priesthood on 18 December 1858, and then did pastoral work in Barcelona for several years. He later became a professor and the rector of its seminary, and was made canon administrator of its cathedral chapter.

Casañas was appointed Apostolic Administrator sede plena of Urgell on 18 January 1879 by Pope Leo XIII, and on the following 7 February Titular bishop of Ceramus. He received his episcopal consecration on 23 March that same year from Bishop José de Urquinaona y Vidot, with Bishops Tomás Sivilla y Gener and Tomás Costa y Fornaguera serving as co-consecrators, in the Cathedral of Barcelona. Casañas was later named Bishop of Urgell on the following 22 September; in this position he also served as Co-Prince of Andorra. The French Co-Princes of Andorra during his leadership were Jules Grévy, Sadi Carnot, Jean Casimir-Perier, and Félix Faure. He was a senator for the ecclesiastical province of Tarragona as well.

Pope Leo created him Cardinal Priest of Santi Quirico e Giulitta in the consistory of 29 November 1895. Casañas was made Bishop of Barcelona on 18 April 1901, and later participated in the papal conclave of 1903, which selected Pope Pius X. On Christmas Day 1905, an anarchist made an unsuccessful attempt to assassinate the Cardinal in the cloister of the Barcelona cathedral.

Casañas died in Barcelona, at the age of 74. He is buried in the cathedral of the same.

Catholic Church titles
Preceded by José Caixal Estradé	Bishop of Urgell; 1879–1901	Succeeded by Ramón Ríu y Cabanas
Preceded by José Morgades y Gili	Bishop of Barcelona; 1901–1908	Succeeded by Juan Laguarda y Fenollera
Regnal titles
Preceded by José Caixal Estradé	Co-Prince of Andorra; 1879–1901; Served alongside: Jules Grévy; Sadi Carnot; Jean Casimir-Perier; Félix Faure; Émile Loubet	Succeeded by Ramón Ríu y Cabanas
