= Joan Josep Laguarda i Fenollera =

Bishop of Urgel, ex-officio Co-Prince of Andorra

- Bishop of Barcelona
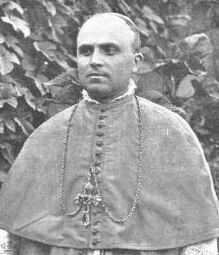
- Church: Catholic Church
- Diocese: Diocese of Barcelona
- In office: 29 April 1909 – 4 December 1913
- Predecessor: Salvador Casañas y Pagés
- Successor: Enrique Reig y Casanova
- Previous posts: Bishop of Jaén (1906-1909); Bishop of Urgell (1902-1906); Titular Bishop of Titiopolis (1899-1902); Auxiliary Bishop of Toledo (1899-1902)

Orders
- Consecration: 15 October 1899 by Ciriaco María Sancha y Hervás

Personal details
- Born: 22 April 1866 Valencia, Province of Valencia, Kingdom of Spain
- Died: 4 December 1913 (aged 47)

Joan Josep Laguarda i Fenollera (22 April 1866 – 4 December 1913) was Bishop of Urgell and ex officio Co-Prince of Andorra from 1902 to 1906. He was also Bishop of Barcelona from 29 April 1909 – 4 December 1913.

He was succeeded as Co-Prince of Andorra by Josep Pujargimzú, Vicar capitular, during the sede vacante until Justí Guitart i Vilardebó served as the next bishop.
