= Opalescence =

Optical effect displayed by opal

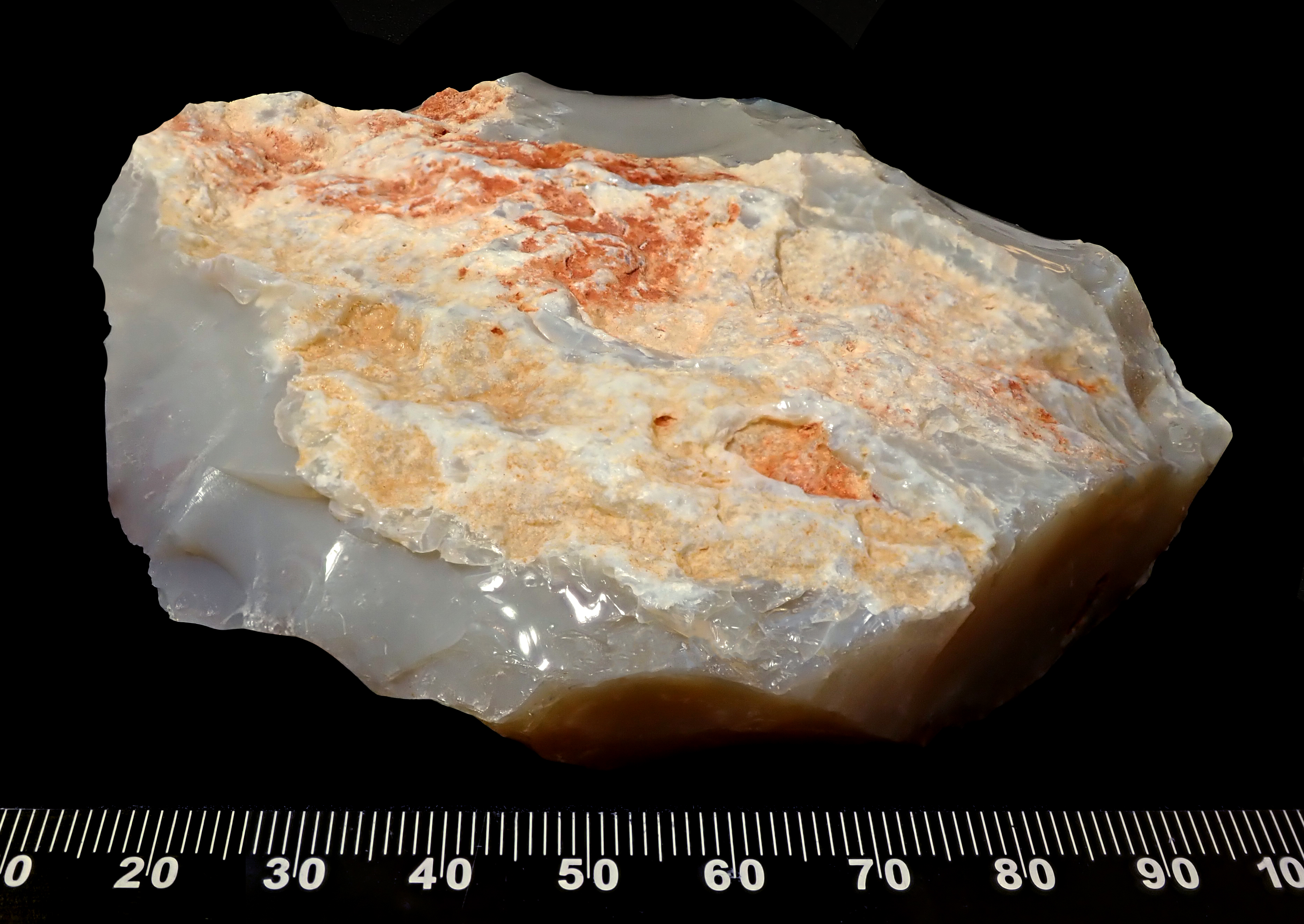
Rough sample of common opal

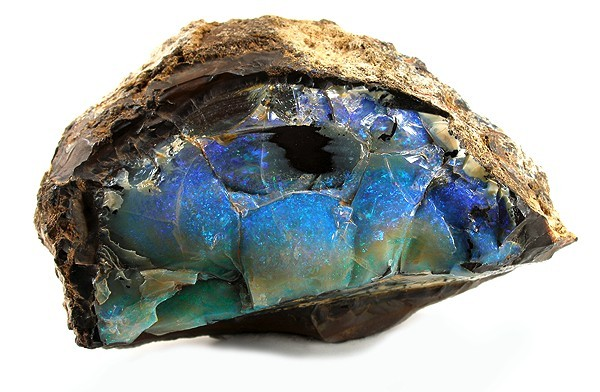
Rough sample of precious opal, showing iridescence

Opalescence or play of color is an optical phenomenon associated with the mineraloid gemstone opal, a hydrated silicon dioxide. This effect appears as a milky, translucent glow that changes with the angle of light, often creating a soft, pearly sheen that can display various colors or hues. Opalescence can be seen in materials like certain minerals, glass, and even fluids.

== Definition ==
Each of the three notable types of opal – precious, common, and fire – display different optical effects; therefore, the intended meaning varies depending on context.

- The general definition of opalescence is a milky iridescence displayed by an opal, which describes the visual effect of precious opal very well, and opalescence is commonly used in lay terms as a synonym for iridescence.
- In contrast, common opal does not display an iridescence, but often exhibits a hazy sheen of light from within the stone – the phenomenon that gemologists strictly term as opalescence. This milky sheen displayed by opal is a form of adularescence.
- Fire opal is a relatively transparent gemstone with a vivid yellow-orange-red color and rarely displays iridescence.

== Mechanism ==
The optical effects seen in various types of opal are a result of refraction (precious and fire) or reflection (common) due to the layering, spacing, and size of the myriad microscopic silicon dioxide spheres and included water (or air) in its physical structure. When the size and spacing of the silica spheres are relatively small, refracted blue-green colors are prevalent; when relatively larger, refracted yellow-orange-red colors are seen; and when larger yet, reflection yields a milky-hazy sheen.

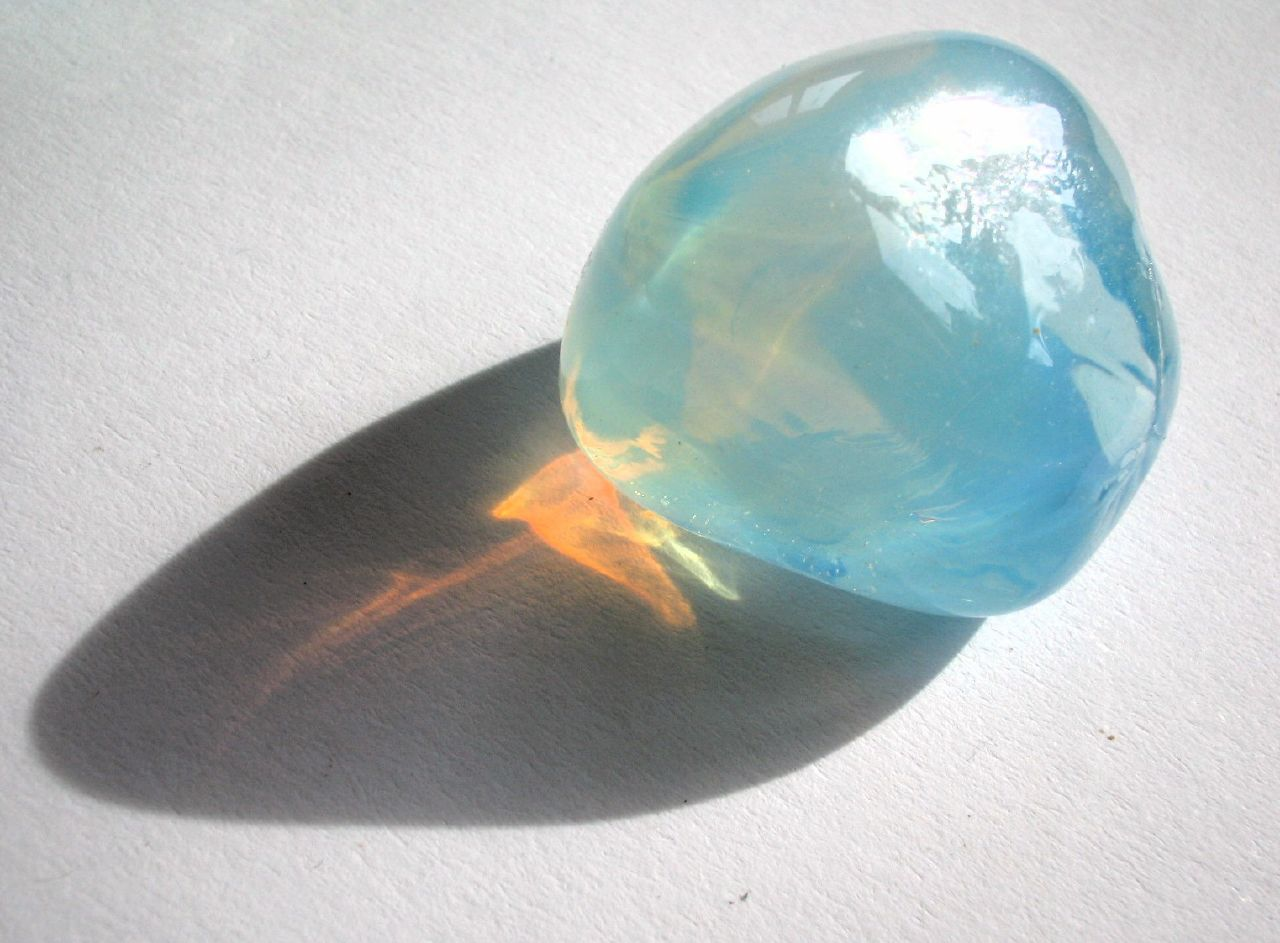
Tyndall effect in opalescent glass: it appears blue from the side, but orange light shines through.

In a physical sense, some cases of opalescence could be related to a type of dichroism seen in highly dispersed systems with little opacity. Due to Rayleigh scattering, a transparent material appears yellowish-red in transmitted white light and blue in the scattered light perpendicular to the transmitted light. The phenomenon illustrated in the bottom photo is an example of the Tyndall effect.

== Fluids ==
In fluids, the near the gas-liquid transition, the substance can become cloudy. This phenomenon is called critical opalescence.

== See also ==
- Aventurescence
- Labradorescence
- Moonstone (gemstone)
