= Capodacqua, Assisi =

Capodacqua
- Frazione
- Location within Italy
- Coordinates: 43°01′46″N 12°39′00″E
- Country: Italy
- Region: Umbria
- Province: Perugia
- Comune: Assisi
- Elevation: 300 m (980 ft)

Population (2001)
  - Total: 40
- Time zone: UTC+1 (CET)
  - Summer (DST): UTC+2 (CEST)
- Postcode: 06081
- Area code: 075

Capodacqua is a frazione of the comune of Assisi in the Province of Perugia, Umbria, central Italy. It stands at an elevation of 300 metres above sea level. At the time of the Istat census of 2001 it had 40 inhabitants.
