= Barnabites =

Religious order of clerics regular

Clerics Regular of Saint Paul
- Congregatio Clericorum Regularium Sancti Pauli
- One version of the Barnabite logo. "P.A." refers to Paul the Apostle and the three hills symbolize the vows of poverty, chastity and obedience.
- Abbreviation: B or CRSP
- Nickname: Barnabites
- Formation: 1530; 496 years ago
- Founder: Saint Fr. Antonio Maria Zaccaria, B.; Venerable Fr. Bartolomeo Ferrari, B.; Fr. Jacopo Antonio Morigia, B.
- Founded at: Milan, Italy
- Type: Order of Clerics Regular of Pontifical Right for Men
- Headquarters: Via Giacomo Medici 15, Rome, Italy
- Members: 335 members (including 279 priests) as of 2020
- Superior General: Chagas Maria Santos da Silva, B
- Parent organization: Catholic Church
- Website: barnabites.com

The Barnabites (Latin: Barnabitum), officially named as the Clerics Regular of Saint Paul (Latin: Clerici Regulares Sancti Pauli), are a religious order of clerics regular founded in 1530 in the Catholic Church. They are associated with the Angelic Sisters of Saint Paul and the members of the Barnabite lay movement.

== Establishment of the Order ==
Second in seniority of the orders of regular clerics (the Theatines being first), the Barnabites were founded in Milan, by Anthony Mary Zaccaria, Barthélemy Ferrari, and Jacopo Antonio Morigia. The region was then suffering severely from the wars between Charles V and Francis I, and Zaccaria saw the need for radical reform of the Church in Lombardy, afflicted by problems typical for that era: dioceses without a bishop, clergy with inadequate theological training, a decrease in religious practice, and monasteries and convents in decline.

It was approved by Pope Clement VII in the brief Vota per quae vos on 18 February 1533. Later approvals gave it the status of a Religious Order, but it is still normally referred to as a congregation. Both the date and the vocation place it among the Orders associated with the Counter-Reformation. Zaccaria's holiness moved many to reform their lives but it also moved many to oppose him. Twice his community had to undergo an official religious investigation, and twice it was exonerated.

The order was given the name of "Regular Clerics of St. Paul" (Clerici Regulares Sancti Pauli). In 1538 the grand old monastery of Saint Barnabas by the city wall of Milan was given to the congregation as their main seat, and thenceforth they were known by the popular name of Barnabites. After the death of Zaccaria in 1539, the congregation was favoured and protected by Archbishop Charles Borromeo of Milan and later by Francis de Sales because of their successful missionary work in Upper Italy. Charles Borromeo presided, in 1579, as Cardinal Protector, over the commission which wrote the Constitutions of the Order. The General Chapters of the Order were regularly held at Milan until the reign of Pope Alexander VII (1655–67), who ordered them to convene in Rome. Pope Innocent XI (1676–89), however, finally decreed that they should be held in Rome and Milan alternately.

These assemblies of the Provincial Superiors were held every three years for the election of a new Superior General, whose term of office was limited to that period, only one re-election being allowed to each incumbent of the office.

The Society started pastoral activity among the working classes and in monasteries. In the early 17th century, the Barnabites gradually entered the field of education – work which was to remain a mark of their apostolate. They entered France under Henry IV in 1608, and Austria under Ferdinand II in 1626.

The present Constitution is an updated version dated 1983, which takes into account the changes from the Second Vatican Council. There is a female branch of Religious Sisters, the Angelic Sisters of St. Paul, found by Anthony Mary Zaccaria, and an organization for lay people, the Laity of St. Paul, originally called the Married of St. Paul and sometimes referred to in North America as the Oblates of St. Paul.

As of March 29, 2025, the new Superior General comes from Democratic Republic of the Congo: the Very Rev. Étienne Ntalé Majaliwa, until that day provincial father in Belgium.

== Character of the Order ==
As indicated by the official name of the order, the work of the Barnabites is inspired by St. Paul the Apostle. In an address in 2000, to the institute's General Chapter, Pope John Paul II noted, "[I]n pointing out the ideal of religious and apostolic life to his spiritual sons, St Anthony Mary Zaccaria emphasized charity."

The members of the Order make, in addition to the three standard religious vows of poverty, chastity, and obedience, a fourth vow never to strive for any office or position of dignity, or to accept such otherwise than under a command of the Holy See.

The focus of the goals of the Barnabite Order, besides preaching in general, catechizing, hearing confessions, giving missions, ministrations in hospitals and prisons, and the education of youth, includes also a particular devotion to the thorough study and exposition of St. Paul's Epistles. Their habit is the black soutane which formed the usual garb of Milanese secular priests in the time of Borromeo. He himself was not a member but is venerated by the Barnabites as a secondary patron saint of their Order.

The first missions undertaken by the Order were in Italy, France, the former Duchy of Savoy, Austria and Bohemia. In the 18th century, they started missions in China and Brazil. Today, they serve in 15 countries. Until 2021 they were active in Afghanistan, where they had run the Afghan Catholic Mission since 1933, interrupted only while the Taliban regime was in power.

== Saints, blesseds, and other holy people ==
Saints

- Antonio Maria Zaccaria (c. 1502 – 5 July 1539), founder of the Order, canonized on 27 May 1897
- Alessandro Sauli (15 February 1534 – 11 October 1592), "Apostle of Corsica", canonized on 11 December 1904
- Francesco Saverio Maria Bianchi (2 December 1743 – 31 January 1815), "Apostle of Naples", canonized on 21 October 1951

Venerables

- Giovanni Francesco (Carlo Maria) Bascapè (25 October 1550 - 6 October 1615), Bishop of Novara, declared Venerable on 19 December 2005
- Antonio (Bartolomeo Maria) Canale (10 December 1605 - 27 January 1681), priest, declared Venerable on 26 July 1948
- Karl Halfdan Schilling (9 June 1835 - 2 January 1907), the only post-Reformation Norwegian to be officially considered for sainthood, declared Venerable on 19 September 1968
- Luigi Maria Raineri (19 November 1895 - 24 November 1918), cleric, declared Venerable on 7 November 2018
- Serafino Maria Ghidini (10 January 1902 - 13 January 1924), cleric, declared Venerable on 2 July 1994
- Vittorio Maria de Marino (7 June 1863 – 16 July 1929), physician and priest, declared Venerable on 21 December 1992
- Cesare Maria Barzaghi (28 March 1863 - 4 May 1941), priest, declared Venerable on 6 July 1993

Servants of God

- Antonio Maria Pagni (21 December 1556 - 26 January 1624), priest
- Raimondo Maria Recrosio (1 October 1657 - 1 May 1732), Bishop of Nice
- Francesco Maria Castelli (19 March 1752 - 18 September 1771), cleric
- Fortunato Maria Redolfi (8 November 1777 - 8 April 1850), priest
- Giacobbe Maria Priscolo (1 June 1761 - 17 June 1853), priest
- Eliseu Maria Coroli (9 February 1900 - 29 July 1982), Bishop of Guamá and founder of the Missionaries of Saint Therese, declared as Servant of God on 20 May 1996

== Prominent Barnabites ==
Vincenzo Sangermano was a Barnabite who was a missionary in Burma and wrote several books about the Burmese people.

Barnabites engaged in a wide range of teaching, scholarship, and technological practice during the early modern era. Many Barnabites became great scholars and scientists, including the astronomers Redento Baranzano and Paolo Frisi, the naturalist Ermenegildo Pini and the meteorologist Francesco Denza.

Several members of the Order became cardinals. The first was Giacomo Antonio Morigia, Archbishop of Florence (1683–1699), one of the founders of the Barnabites, who was raised to the cardinalate on 12 December 1695 by Pope Innocent XII, though his appointment was kept secret (in pectore reservatus) until 19 December 1698. Hyacinthe Sigismond Gerdil, a Consultor of the Roman Inquisition, and former preceptor (supervising teacher), from 1758, of the Prince of Piedmont, afterwards King Charles Emmanuel IV, and then, in 1768, of Charles Emmanuel's sons, was named a cardinal in secret (in pectore) on 23 June 1777, and announced publicly on 15 December 1777. Luigi Bilio (1826–1884), a Consultor of the Congregation of the Inquisition and collaborator in the production of the Syllabus of Errors (1864), was appointed a cardinal on 25 June 1866 by Pope Pius IX, and named Secretary of the Congregation of the Inquisition by Pope Leo XIII in 1883. Others were: Francesco Fontana, appointed in 1816 by Pope Pius VII; Luigi Lambruschini, appointed in 1831 by Pope Gregory XVI; Antonio Cadolini, appointed in 1843 by Gregory XVI; and Giuseppe Maria Graniello, appointed in 1893 by Pope Leo XIII.

John Bellarini (1552–1630), who was the Visitor of the Order, and twice held the office of Assistant Superior General, was also a theologian who wrote a number of works including an influential commentary on the Council of Trent.
